= 1926 in Michigan =

- Decades: 1900s; 1910s; 1920s; 1930s; 1940s
- See also: History of Michigan; Historical outline of Michigan; List of years in Michigan; 1926 in the United States

Events from the year 1926 in Michigan.

== Office holders ==
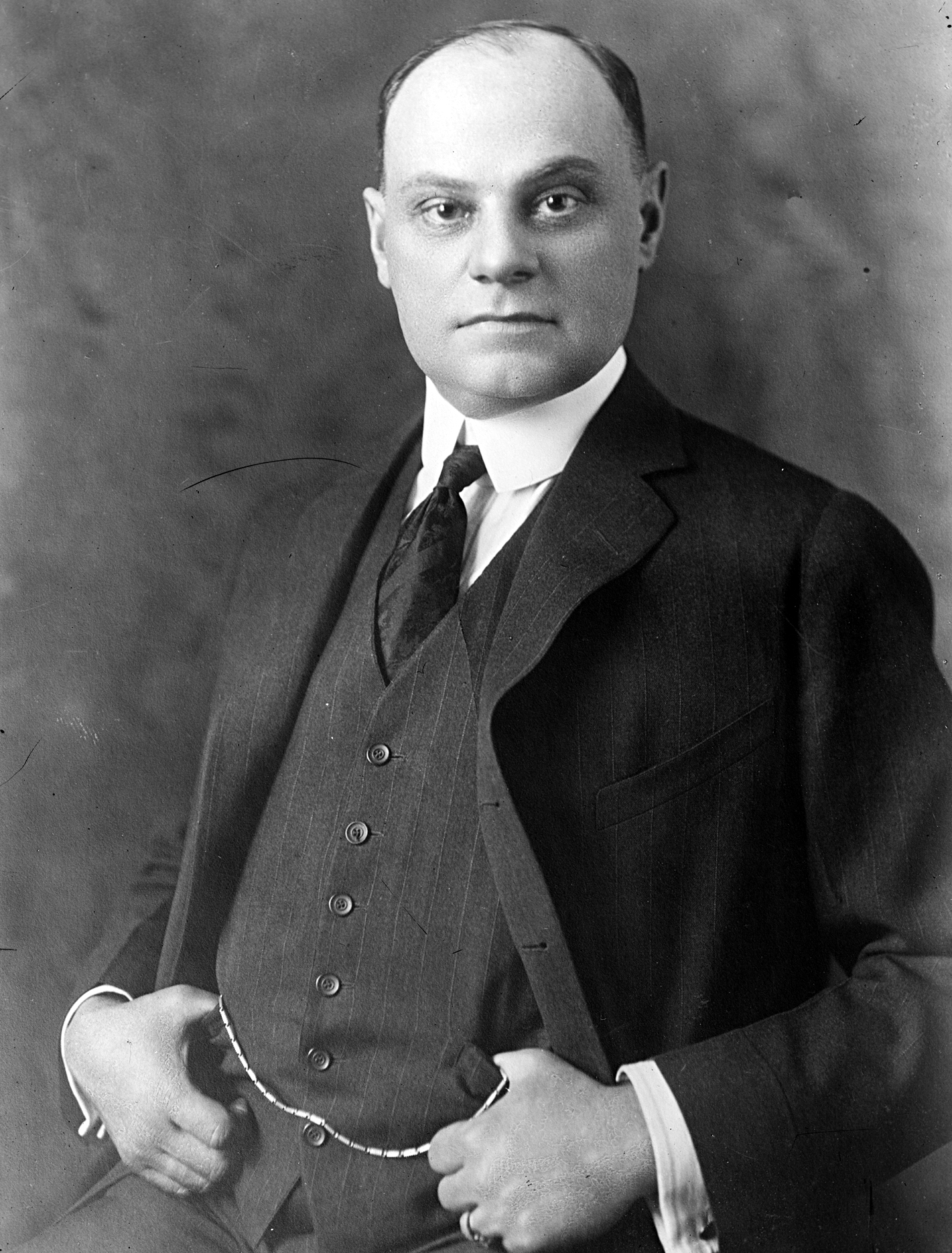
Gov. Groesbeck

=== State office holders ===
- Governor of Michigan: Alex J. Groesbeck (Republican)
- Lieutenant Governor of Michigan: George W. Welsh (Republican)
- Michigan Attorney General: Clare Retan (Republican)
- Michigan Secretary of State: Charles J. DeLand (Republican)
- Speaker of the Michigan House of Representatives: Fred B. Wells (Republican)
- Chief Justice, Michigan Supreme Court: John E. Bird

=== Mayors of major cities ===
- Mayor of Detroit: John W. Smith
- Mayor of Grand Rapids: Elvin Swarthout
- Mayor of Flint: Judson L. Transue
- Mayor of Lansing: Alfred H. Doughty
- Mayor of Saginaw: Ben N. Mercer
- Mayor of Ann Arbor: Robert A. Campbell

=== Federal office holders ===
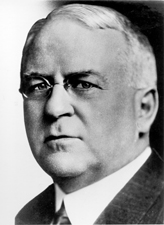
Sen. James Couzens

- U.S. Senator from Michigan: James J. Couzens (Republican)
- U.S. Senator from Michigan: Woodbridge N. Ferris (Democrat)
- House District 1: John B. Sosnowski (Republican)
- House District 2: Earl C. Michener (Republican)
- House District 3: Joseph L. Hooper (Republican)
- House District 4: John C. Ketcham (Republican)
- House District 5: Carl E. Mapes (Republican)
- House District 6: Grant M. Hudson (Republican)
- House District 7: Louis C. Cramton (Republican)
- House District 8: Bird J. Vincent (Republican)
- House District 9: James C. McLaughlin (Republican)
- House District 10: Roy O. Woodruff (Republican)
- House District 11: Frank D. Scott (Republican)
- House District 12: W. Frank James (Republican)
- House District 13: Clarence J. McLeod (Republican)

== Population ==
In the 1920 United States census, Michigan was recorded as having a population of 3,668,412, ranking as the seventh most populous state in the country. By 1930, Michigan's population had increased by 32.0% to 4,842,325.

=== Cities ===
The following is a list of cities in Michigan with a population of at least 15,000 based on 1920 U.S. Census data. Historic census data from 1910 and 1930 is included to reflect trends in population increases or decreases.

1920 Rank	City	County	1910 Pop.	1920 Pop.	1930 Pop.	Change 1920-30
1	Detroit	Wayne	465,766	993,678	1,568,662	57.9%
2	Grand Rapids	Kent	112,571	137,634	168,592	22.5%
3	Flint	Genesee	38,550	91,599	156,492	70.8%
4	Saginaw	Saginaw	50,510	61,903	80,715	30.4%
5	Lansing	Ingham	31,229	57,327	78,397	36.8%
6	Hamtramck	Wayne	3,559	48,615	56,268	15.7%
7	Kalamazoo	Kalamazoo	39,437	48,487	54,786	13.0%
8	Jackson	Jackson	31,433	48,374	55,187	14.1%
9	Bay City	Bay	45,166	47,554	47,355	−0.4%
10	Highland Park	Wayne	4,120	46,499	52,959	13.9%
11	Muskegon	Muskegon	24,062	36,570	41,390	15.2%
12	Battle Creek	Calhoun	25,267	36,164	45,573	26.0%
13	Pontiac	Oakland	14,532	34,273	64,928	89.4%
14	Port Huron	St. Clair	18,863	25,944	31,361	20.9%
15	Ann Arbor	Washtenaw	14,817	19,516	26,944	38.1%
16	Ironwood	Gogebic	12,821	15,739	14,299	−9.1%

=== Boom cities of the 1920s ===
The 1920s saw explosive growth in the population of small cities near Detroit, with some communities growing more than three fold. Dearborn was the most extreme case, growing 20-fold from 2,470 to 50,358 persons.

1920 Rank	City	County	1910 Pop.	1920 Pop.	1930 Pop.	Change 1920-30
	Warren	Macomb	2,346	6,780	24,024	254.3%
	Royal Oak	Oakland	1,071	6,007	22,904	281.3%
	Ferndale	Oakland	--	2,640	20,855	690.0%
	Dearborn	Wayne	911	2,470	50,358	1,938.8%

=== Counties ===
The following is a list of counties in Michigan with populations of at least 40,000 based on 1920 U.S. Census data. Historic census data from 1910 and 1930 are included to reflect trends in population increases or decreases.

1920 Rank	County	Largest city	1910 Pop.	1920 Pop.	1930 Pop.	Change 1920-30
1	Wayne	Detroit	531,591	1,177,645	1,888,946	60.4%
2	Kent	Grand Rapids	159,145	183,041	240,511	31.4%
3	Genesee	Flint	64,555	125,668	211,641	68.4%
4	Saginaw	Saginaw	89,290	100,286	120,717	20.4%
5	Oakland	Pontiac	49,576	90,050	211,251	134.6%
6	Ingham	Lansing	53,310	81,554	116,587	43.0%
7	Calhoun	Battle Creek	56,638	72,918	87,043	19.4%
8	Houghton	Houghton	88,098	71,930	52,851	-26.5%
9	Jackson	Jackson	53,426	72,539	92,304	27.2%
10	Kalamazoo	Kalamazoo	60,327	71,225	91,368	28.3%
11	Bay	Bay City	68,238	69,548	69,474	-0.1%
12	Berrien	Niles	53,622	62,653	81,066	29.4%
13	Muskegon	Muskegon	40,577	62,362	84,630	35.7%
14	St. Clair	Port Huron	52,341	58,009	67,563	16.5%
15	Washtenaw	Ann Arbor	44,714	49,520	65,530	32.3%
16	Lenawee	Adrian	47,907	47,767	49,849	4.4%
17	Ottawa	Holland	45,301	47,660	54,858	15.1%
18	Marquette	Marquette	46,739	45,786	44,076	−3.7%

== Sports ==
=== Baseball ===
- 1926 Detroit Tigers season – Under manager Ty Cobb, the Tigers compiled a 79–75 record and finished in sixth place in the American League. The team's statistical leaders included Heinie Manush with a .378 batting average and 14 home runs, Harry Heilmann with 101 RBIs, Earl Whitehill with 16 wins, and Rip Collins with a 2.73 earned run average.

=== American football ===
- 1926 Detroit Panthers season – Under head coach Jimmy Conzelman, the Panthers compiled a 4–6–2 record and finished 12th in the National Football League. Gus Sonnenberg led the team with 34 points scored on nine field goals and seven extra points.
- 1926 Michigan Wolverines football team – In their 25th season under head coach Fielding H. Yost, the Wolverines compiled a 7–1 record and tied for the Big Ten Conference championship. Quarterback Benny Friedman and end Bennie Oosterbaan were All-Americans.
- 1926 Western State Hilltoppers football team – Under head coach Earl Martineau, the Hilltoppers compiled a 7–1 record and outscored opponents by a total of 132 to 20.
- 1926 Michigan State Normal Normalites football team – Under head coach Elton Rynearson, the Normalites compiled a 6–1 record, shut out six of their seven opponents, and outscored all opponents by a total of 113 to 12.
- 1926 Detroit Titans football team – Under head coach Gus Dorais, the Titans compiled a 3–6–1 record and outscored all opponents by a combined 132 to 62.
- 1926 Michigan State Spartans football team – Under head coach Ralph H. Young, the Spartans compiled a 3–4–1 record.
- 1926 Central Michigan Dragons football team – Under head coach Wallace Parker, the Dragons compiled a 3–4–1 record and were outscored by a combined total of 90 to 66.

=== Basketball ===
- 1925–26 Michigan Wolverines men's basketball team – Under head coach E. J. Mather, the Wolverines compiled a 12–5 record and tied for the Big Ten Conference championship.

== Chronology of events ==
=== January ===
- January 1 – The National Automobile Chamber of Commerce announced that vehicle production in 1925 reached an all-time high with 3,883,000 cars and 492,000 trucks. The number of Ford Motor Co. employees in the United States had risen to 191,948.
- January 6 – Police supervised the seizure of property at the Detroit headquarters of the Ku Klux Klan at East Hancock Avenue and John R. Street following a judgment for nonpayment of rent. Members of the organization threatened violence against reporters covering the event.
- January 9 – Police conducted 69 raids resulting in arrests of 29 women and 26 men and seizure of 600 gallons of beer. The raids targeted "prohibition violators, disorderly houses and gambling resorts."
- John W. Smith was inaugurated for his second term as Mayor of Detroit. In an address to the city's Common Council, he urged respect for the laws of the city, state and country as a vital factor in American life.

=== November ===
- November 2 – A number of elections occurred, including:
  - United States House of Representatives – All 13 of Michigan's U.S. Representatives won re-election except for John B. Sosnowski in Michigan's 1st congressional district, who was not renominated and was replaced by fellow Republican, Robert H. Clancy, and Frank D. Scott in Michigan's 11th congressional district, who was also not renominated and was replaced by fellow Republican, Frank P. Bohn. The delegation remained entirely Republican.
  - Michigan Governor – Republican nominee, Fred W. Green, defeated Democratic nominee William Comstock.

== Births ==
- January 29 – Bob Hollway, assistant coach in NFL (1967–1986), in Ann Arbor, Michigan
- March 4 – Richard DeVos, co-founder of Amway, in Grand Rapids, Michigan
- March 24 – William Porter, gold medalist in 110 m hurdles at 1948 Olympics, in Essex Township, Michigan
- March 29 – Joseph Ponsetto, quarterback for Michigan (1944-1945), in Kent County, Michigan
- April 30 – Ed Bagdon, lineman for Michigan State who won the 1948 Outland Trophy and then played in NFL (1950-1953), in Dearborn, Michigan
- July 8 – John Dingell, U.S. House of Representatives (1955-2015), in Colorado Springs, Colorado
- August 21 – Dick Rifenburg, All-American football end at Michigan and in NFL, in Petoskey, Michigan
- September 19 – James Lipton, writer, lyricist, actor and dean emeritus of the Actors Studio Drama School and host of Inside the Actors Studio, in Detroit
- September 29 – Philip Ruppe, U.S. House of Representatives (1967-1979), in Laurium, Michigan
- October 19 – Joel Feinberg, political and legal philosopher, in Detroit
- November 4 – Tubby Raymond, head football coach at Delaware (1966-2001) inducted into College Football Hall of Fame, in Flint, Michigan

== Deaths ==
- March 28 – John T. Rich, Governor of Michigan (1893-1897) and U.S. Congressman from Michigan (1881–1883), at age 84 in St. Petersburg, Florida
- October 31 – Harry Houdini, stage musician and stunt performer, at age 52 in Detroit
- December 29 – Joseph F. Hambitzer, Michigan State Treasurer (1893-1894), at age 70 in Hancock

== See also ==
- History of Michigan
- History of Detroit
