= 1925 in Michigan =

- Decades: 1900s; 1910s; 1920s; 1930s; 1940s
- See also: History of Michigan; Historical outline of Michigan; List of years in Michigan; 1925 in the United States

Events from the year 1925 in Michigan.

== Office holders ==
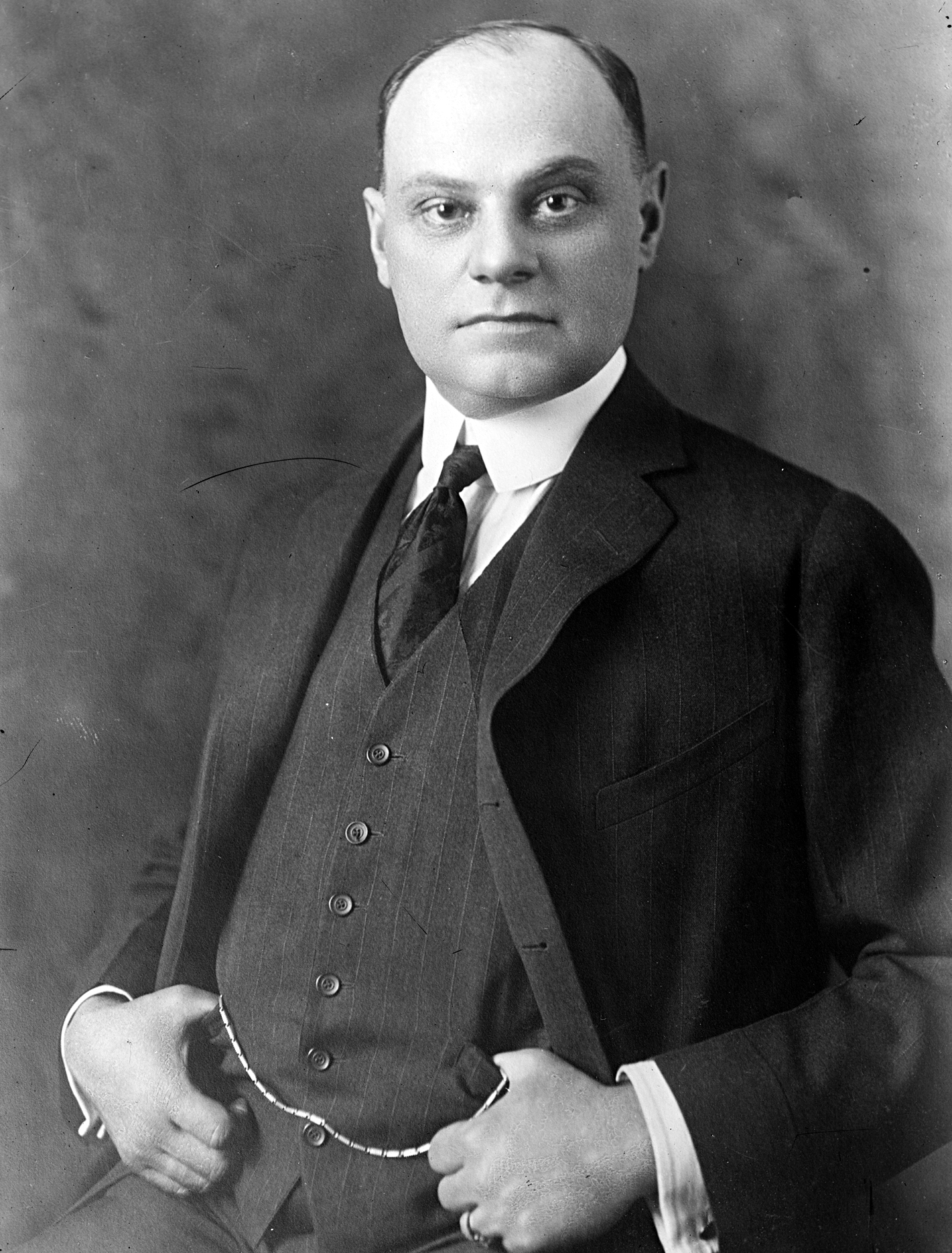
Gov. Groesbeck

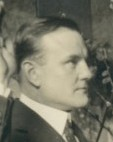
Mayor Smith

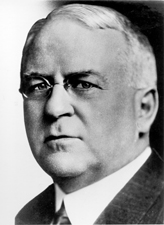
Sen. Couzens

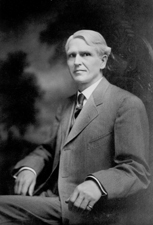
Sen. Ferris

=== State office holders ===
- Governor of Michigan: Alex J. Groesbeck (Republican)
- Lieutenant Governor of Michigan: George W. Welsh (Republican)
- Michigan Attorney General: Andrew B. Dougherty (Republican)
- Michigan Secretary of State: Charles J. DeLand (Republican)
- Speaker of the Michigan House of Representatives: Fred B. Wells (Republican)
- Chief Justice, Michigan Supreme Court: John S. McDonald

=== Mayors of major cities ===
- Mayor of Detroit: John W. Smith
- Mayor of Grand Rapids: Elvin Swarthout
- Mayor of Flint: Judson L. Transue
- Mayor of Lansing: Alfred H. Doughty
- Mayor of Saginaw: Ben N. Mercer
- Mayor of Ann Arbor: George E. Lewis/Robert A. Campbell

=== Federal office holders ===
- U.S. Senator from Michigan: James J. Couzens (Republican)
- U.S. Senator from Michigan: Woodbridge N. Ferris (Democrat)
- House District 1: John B. Sosnowski (Republican)
- House District 2: Earl C. Michener (Republican)
- House District 3: Arthur B. Williams (Republican)
- House District 4: John C. Ketcham (Republican)
- House District 5: Carl E. Mapes (Republican)
- House District 6: Grant M. Hudson (Republican)
- House District 7: Louis C. Cramton (Republican)
- House District 8: Bird J. Vincent (Republican)
- House District 9: James C. McLaughlin (Republican)
- House District 10: Roy O. Woodruff (Republican)
- House District 11: Frank D. Scott (Republican)
- House District 12: W. Frank James (Republican)
- House District 13: Clarence J. McLeod (Republican)

== Population ==
In the 1920 United States census, Michigan was recorded as having a population of 3,668,412, ranking as the seventh most populous state in the country. By 1930, Michigan's population had increased by 32.0% to 4,842,325.

=== Cities ===
The following is a list of cities in Michigan with a population of at least 15,000 based on 1920 U.S. Census data. Historic census data from 1910 and 1930 is included to reflect trends in population increases or decreases.

1920 Rank	City	County	1910 Pop.	1920 Pop.	1930 Pop.	Change 1920-30
1	Detroit	Wayne	465,766	993,678	1,568,662	57.9%
2	Grand Rapids	Kent	112,571	137,634	168,592	22.5%
3	Flint	Genesee	38,550	91,599	156,492	70.8%
4	Saginaw	Saginaw	50,510	61,903	80,715	30.4%
5	Lansing	Ingham	31,229	57,327	78,397	36.8%
6	Hamtramck	Wayne	3,559	48,615	56,268	15.7%
7	Kalamazoo	Kalamazoo	39,437	48,487	54,786	13.0%
8	Jackson	Jackson	31,433	48,374	55,187	14.1%
9	Bay City	Bay	45,166	47,554	47,355	−0.4%
10	Highland Park	Wayne	4,120	46,499	52,959	13.9%
11	Muskegon	Muskegon	24,062	36,570	41,390	15.2%
12	Battle Creek	Calhoun	25,267	36,164	45,573	26.0%
13	Pontiac	Oakland	14,532	34,273	64,928	89.4%
14	Port Huron	St. Clair	18,863	25,944	31,361	20.9%
15	Ann Arbor	Washtenaw	14,817	19,516	26,944	38.1%
16	Ironwood	Gogebic	12,821	15,739	14,299	−9.1%

=== Boom cities of the 1920s ===
The 1920s saw an explosion of growth in the population of small cities near Detroit, with some communities growing more than three fold. Dearborn was the most extreme case, growing 20-fold from 2,470 to 50,358 persons.

1920 Rank	City	County	1910 Pop.	1920 Pop.	1930 Pop.	Change 1920-30
	Warren	Macomb	2,346	6,780	24,024	254.3%
	Royal Oak	Oakland	1,071	6,007	22,904	281.3%
	Ferndale	Oakland	--	2,640	20,855	690.0%
	Dearborn	Wayne	911	2,470	50,358	1,938.8%

=== Counties ===
The following is a list of counties in Michigan with populations of at least 40,000 based on 1920 U.S. Census data. Historic census data from 1910 and 1930 are included to reflect trends in population increases or decreases.

1920 Rank	County	Largest city	1910 Pop.	1920 Pop.	1930 Pop.	Change 1920-30
1	Wayne	Detroit	531,591	1,177,645	1,888,946	60.4%
2	Kent	Grand Rapids	159,145	183,041	240,511	31.4%
3	Genesee	Flint	64,555	125,668	211,641	68.4%
4	Saginaw	Saginaw	89,290	100,286	120,717	20.4%
5	Oakland	Pontiac	49,576	90,050	211,251	134.6%
6	Ingham	Lansing	53,310	81,554	116,587	43.0%
7	Calhoun	Battle Creek	56,638	72,918	87,043	19.4%
8	Houghton	Houghton	88,098	71,930	52,851	-26.5%
9	Jackson	Jackson	53,426	72,539	92,304	27.2%
10	Kalamazoo	Kalamazoo	60,327	71,225	91,368	28.3%
11	Bay	Bay City	68,238	69,548	69,474	-0.1%
12	Berrien	Niles	53,622	62,653	81,066	29.4%
13	Muskegon	Muskegon	40,577	62,362	84,630	35.7%
14	St. Clair	Port Huron	52,341	58,009	67,563	16.5%
15	Washtenaw	Ann Arbor	44,714	49,520	65,530	32.3%
16	Lenawee	Adrian	47,907	47,767	49,849	4.4%
17	Ottawa	Holland	45,301	47,660	54,858	15.1%
18	Marquette	Marquette	46,739	45,786	44,076	−3.7%

== Sports ==
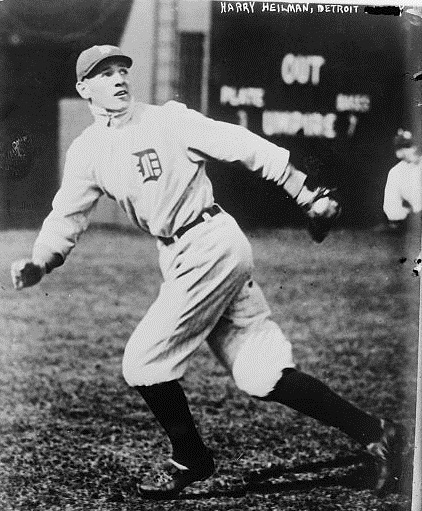
Harry Heilmann

=== Baseball ===
- 1925 Detroit Tigers season – Under player-manager Ty Cobb, the Tigers compiled an 81–73 record and finished fourth in the American League. Harry Heilmann won the American League batting title and also led the league with 134 RBIs. Three Tigers finished among the top five in the league in batting average: Heilmann (1st at .393), Cobb (4th at .378), Al Wingo (5th at .370). Hooks Dauss was the Tigers' leading pitcher with a 3.14 earned run average and a 16-11 win–loss record.
- 1925 Michigan Wolverines baseball season - Under head coach Ray Fisher, the Wolverines compiled a 17–8 record. George Dillman was the team captain.

=== American football ===
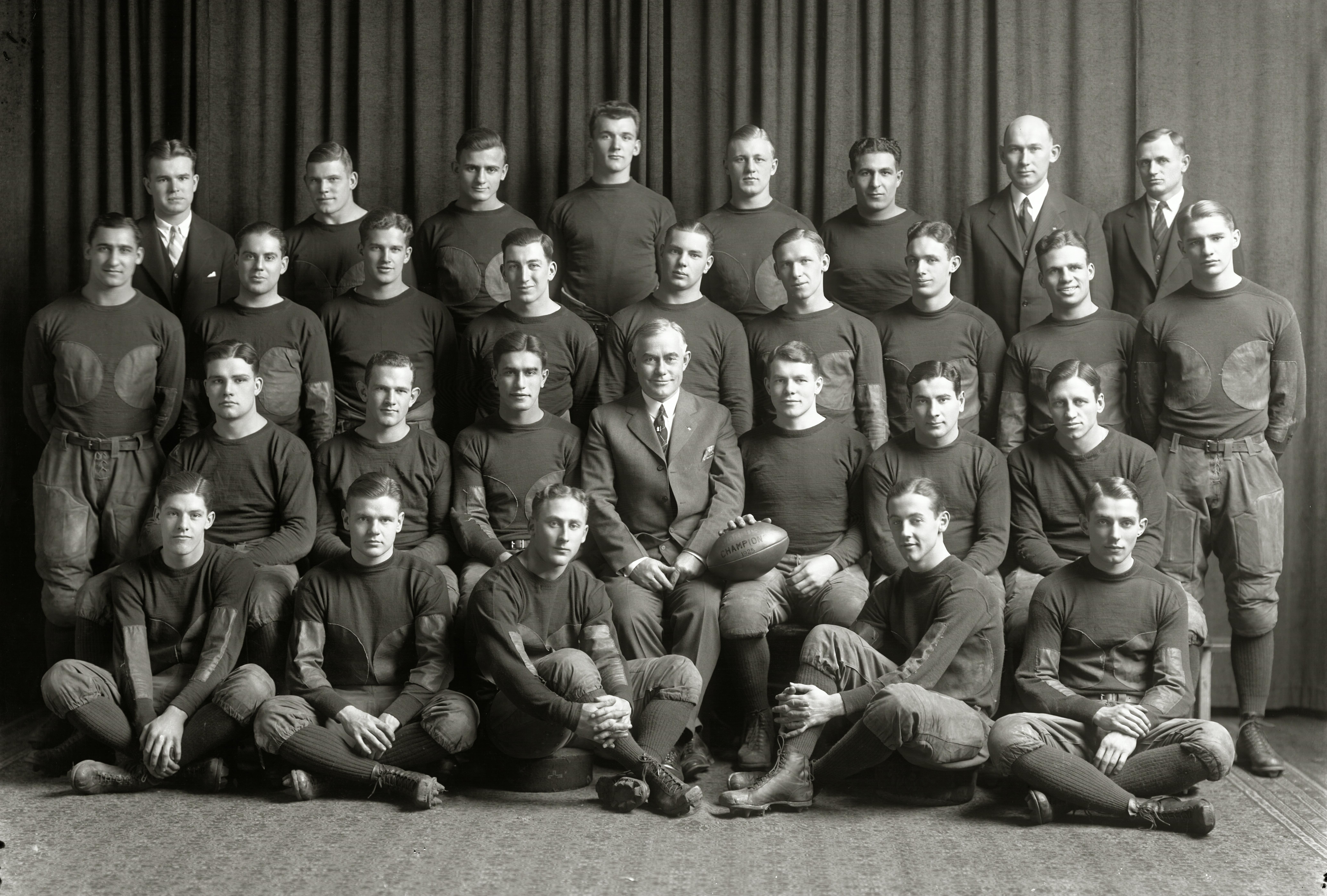
1925 Michigan football team

- 1925 Detroit Panthers season – Under player-coach Jimmy Conzelman, the Panthers compiled an 8–2–2 record and finished in third place in the National Football League. The team's leading scorers were Dinger Doane (30 points) and Gus Sonnenberg (27 points).
- 1925 Michigan Wolverines football team – Under head coach Fielding H. Yost, the Wolverines compiled a 7–1 record, outscored opponents by a combined score of 227 to 3, won the Big Ten Conference championship, and was ranked second in country in the Dickinson System rankings. Quarterback Benny Friedman and left end Bennie Oosterbaan, sometimes referred to as "The Benny-to-Bennie Show," were both consensus All-Americans and became known as one of the greatest passing combinations in college football history.
- 1925 Michigan State Spartans football team – Under head coach Ralph H. Young, the Spartans compiled a 3–5 record.
- 1925 Michigan State Normal Normalites football team - Under head coach Elton Rynearson, the Normalites compiled a perfect 8–0 record, shut out seven of eight opponents, won the Michigan Intercollegiate Athletic Association championship, and outscored all opponents by a combined total of 106 to 6.
- 1925 Detroit Titans football team – The Titans finished with a 5–4 record in their first year under head coach and College Football Hall of Fame inductee, Gus Dorais.
- 1925 Central Michigan Dragons football team - Under head coach Lester Barnard, the Central Michigan football team compiled a 4–1–3 record, shut out six of eight opponents, and outscored all opponents by a combined total of 93 to 20.
- 1925 Western State Hilltoppers football team - Under head coach Earl Martineau, the Hilltoppers compiled a 6–2–1 record and outscored their opponents, 125 to 47.
- Michigan high school football championship –

=== Basketball ===
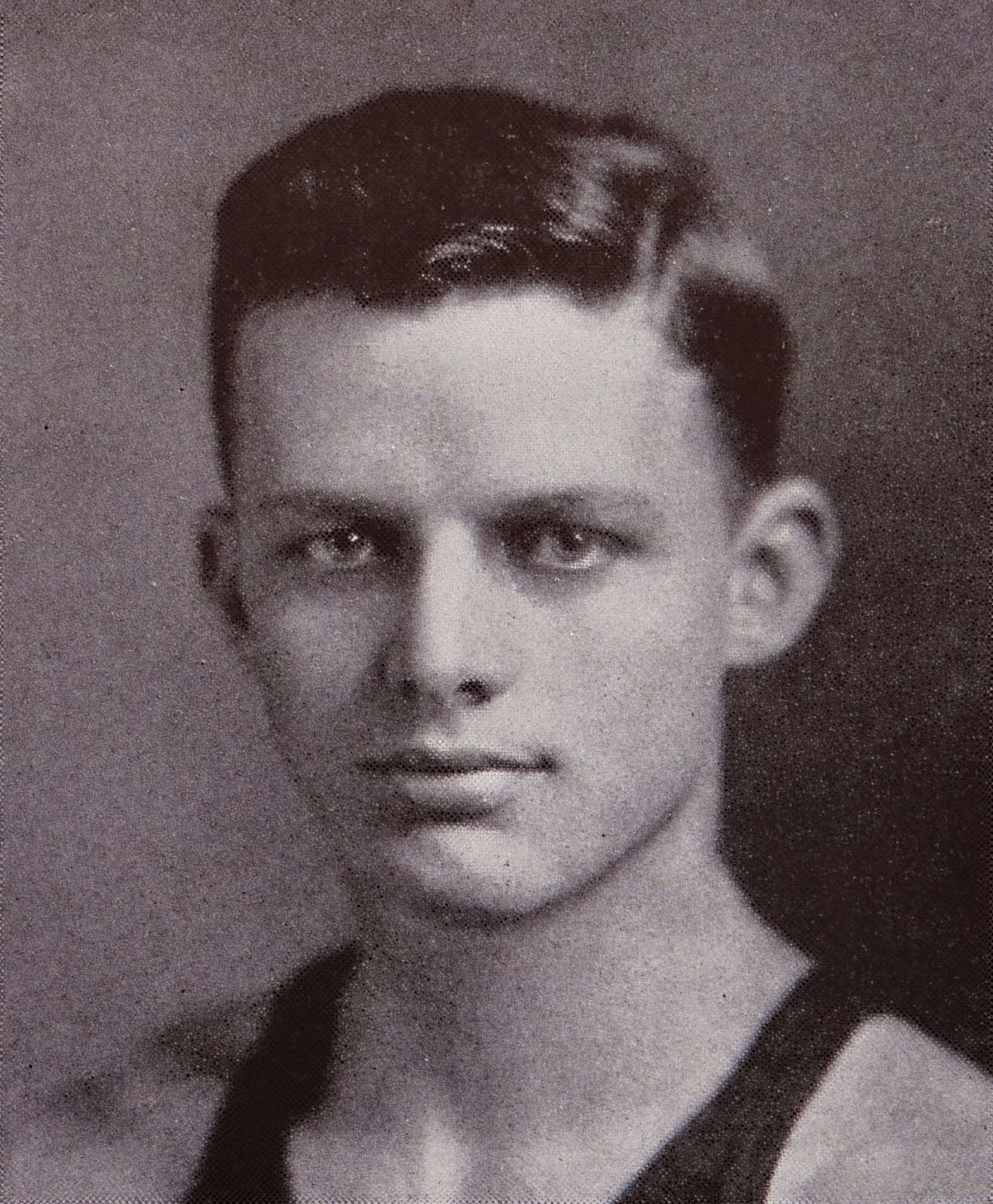
George Haggarty

- 1924–25 Western Michigan men's basketball team – Under head coach Buck Read, Western Michigan compiled a 17–4 record.
- 1924–25 Michigan Wolverines men's basketball team – Under head coach E. J. Mather, the Wolverines compiled a record of 10–7. George Haggarty was the team captain and leading scorer.
- 1924–25 Michigan State Spartans men's basketball - Under head coach John Kobs, the Spartans compiled a 6–13 record.
- 1924–25 Detroit Titans men's basketball team – Under head coach John Barrett, the University of Detroit basketball team compiled a 6–6 record.

=== Ice hockey ===
- 1924–25 Michigan Wolverines men's ice hockey team – Under coach Joseph Barss, the Wolverines compiled a 4-1-1 record.
- 1924–25 Michigan State Spartans men's ice hockey team – The Spartans compiled a 0–1 record under head coach John Kobs.
- 1924–25 Michigan College of Mines men's ice hockey team – The Michigan College of Mines (later renamed Michigan Technological University) team compiled a 2–4 record under head coach Leon Harvey.

=== Other ===
- Port Huron to Mackinac Boat Race – In the inaugural running of the event, the Berndida of Detroit's Bayview Yacht Club, captained by Russell Pouliot, was the winner.
- Michigan Open - Davey Robertson, the instructor at Henry Ford's course in Dearborn, won the Michigan Open on July 21 in Saginaw.

== Chronology of events ==
=== January ===
- January 1 - Alex J. Groesbeck was sworn in for his second term as Governor of Michigan.

=== May ===
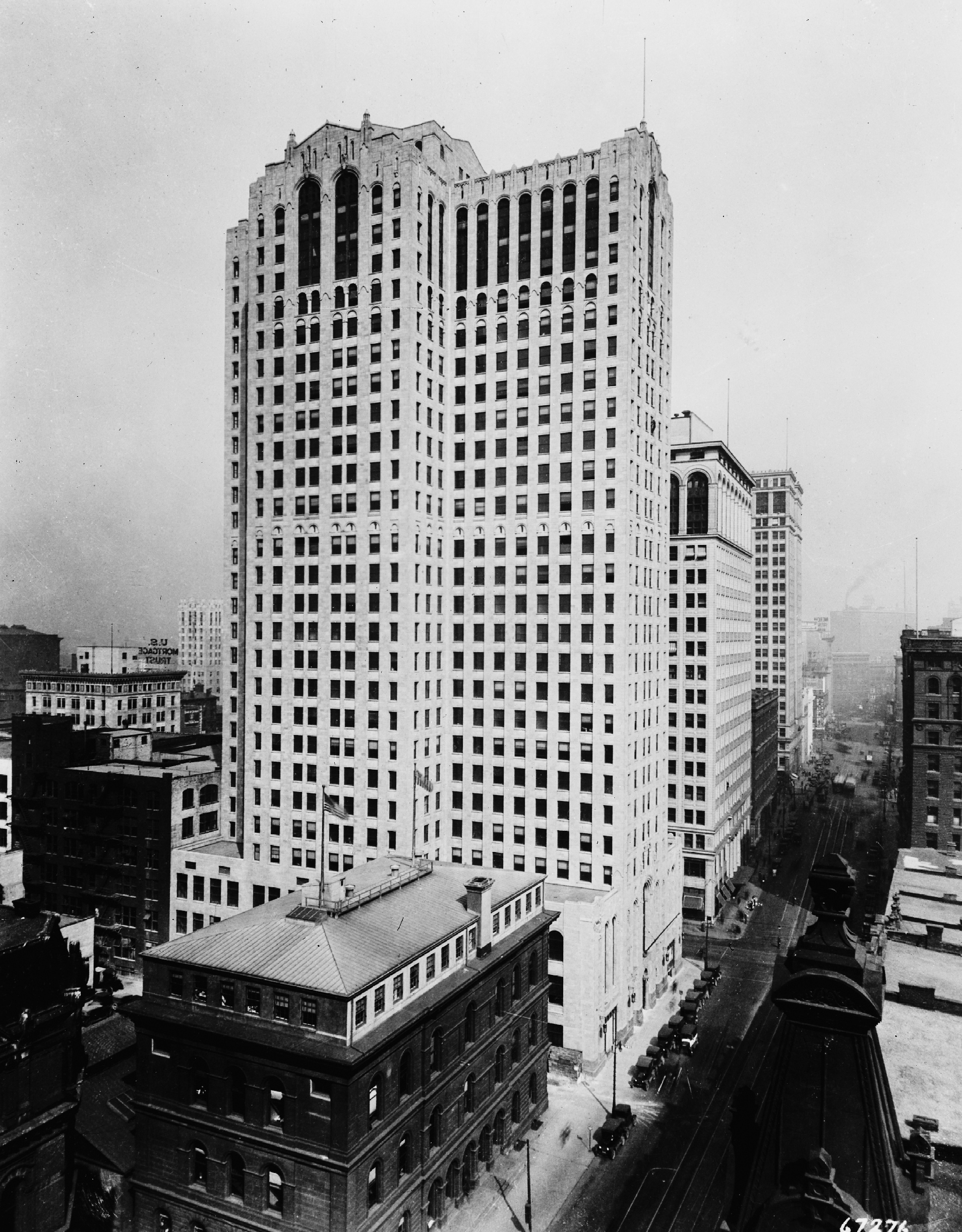
Buhl Building

- May 1 - The 26-story Buhl Building in Detroit opened for occupancy.

== Births ==
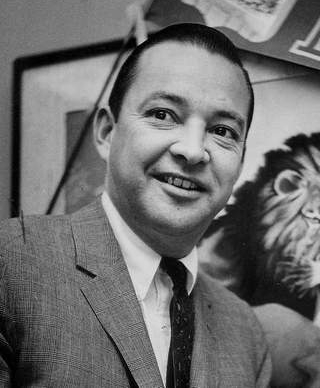
William Clay Ford

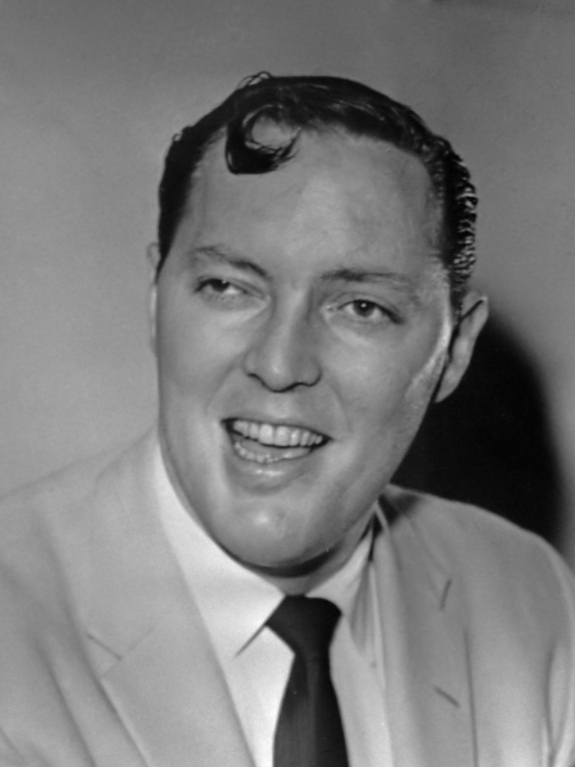
Bill Haley

- January 30 - Bump Elliott, American football player, coach, and athletic director, in Detroit
- February 24 - Lynn Chandnois, American football halfback, NFL Player of the Year for 1952, in Fayette, Michigan
- March 14 - William Clay Ford Sr., last surviving grandson of Henry Ford and owner of Detroit Lions, in Detroit
- March 26 - Vesta M. Roy, Governor of New Hampshire from 1982 to 1983, in Dearborn
- April 14 - Roger Brown, social psychologist, in Detroit
- May 28 - Lucien N. Nedzi, U.S. Congressman from 1965 to 1981, in Hamtramck, Michigan
- May 28 - Martha Vickers, model and actress, in Ann Arbor
- June 27 - Wayne Terwilliger, Major League Baseball infielder from 1949 to 1960, in Clare, Michigan
- July 6 - Bill Haley, musician credited with popularizing rock and roll, in Highland Park, Michigan
- July 29 - Ted Lindsay, ice hockey player for Detroit Red Wings from 1944 to 1965, in Renfrew, Ontario
- July 31 - John Swainson, Governor of Michigan from 1961 to 1963, in Windsor, Ontario
- October 11 - Elmore Leonard, American novelist, short story writer, and screenwriter, in New Orleans
- October 31 - Charles Moore, architect and recipient of the AIA Gold Medal in 1991, in Benton Harbor, Michigan
- December 2 - Julie Harris, actress, winner of five Tony Awards, three Emmy Awards, and a Grammy Award, in Grosse Pointe
- December 5 - Donald J. Albosta, U.S. Congressman from 1979 to 1985, in Saginaw
- December 21 - Bob Rush, Major League Baseball pitcher from 1948 to 1960, in Battle Creek
- December 29 - Roman Gribbs, Mayor of Detroit from 1970 to 1974, in Detroit

=== Gallery of 1925 births ===
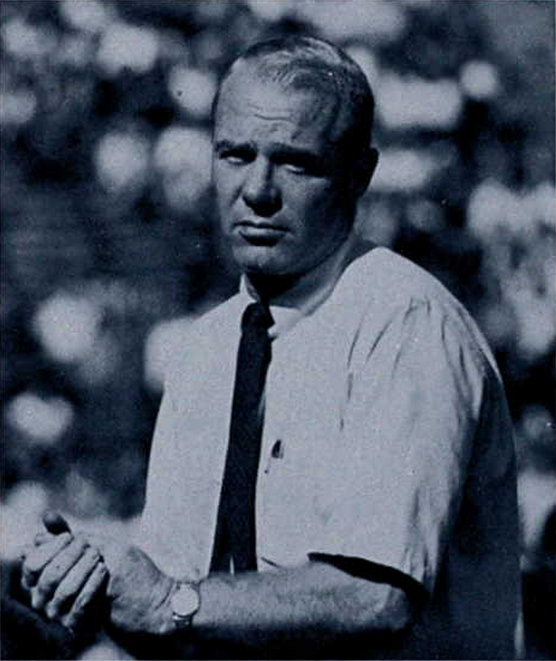
Bump Elliott

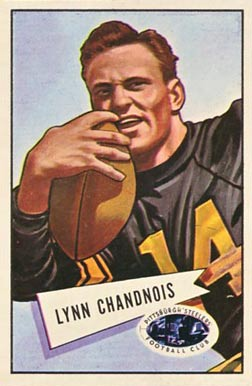
Lynn Chandnois

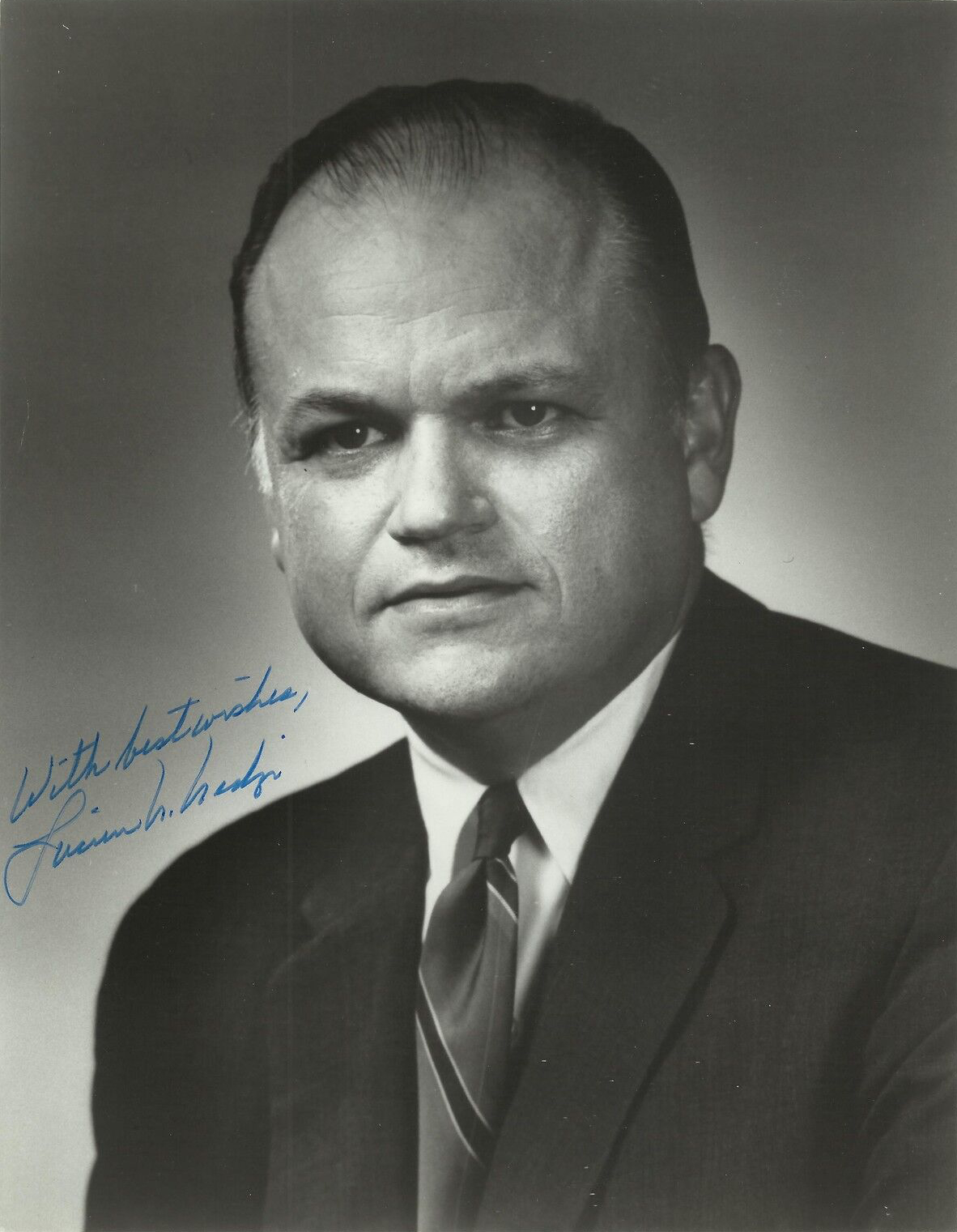
Lucien N. Nedzi

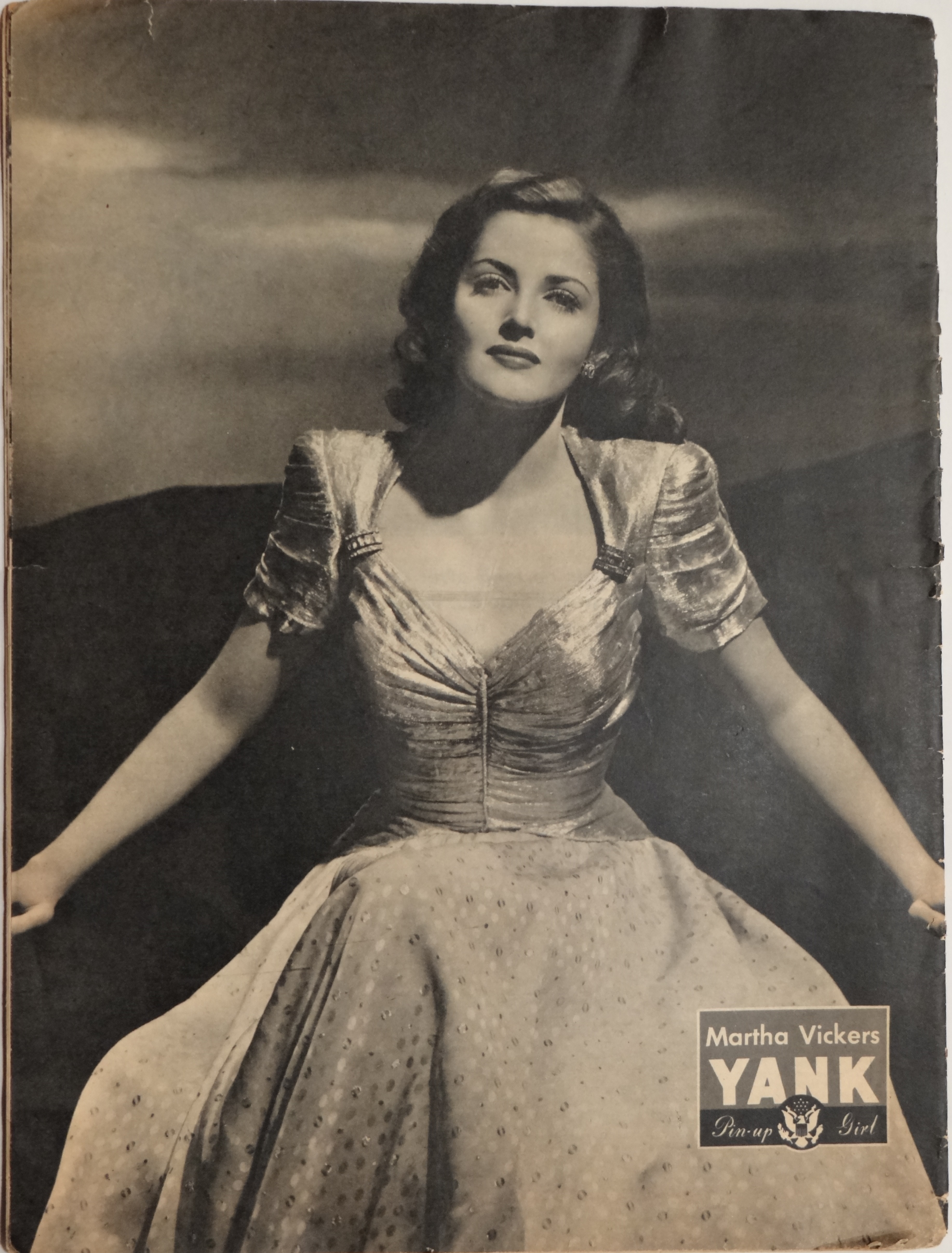
Martha Vickers

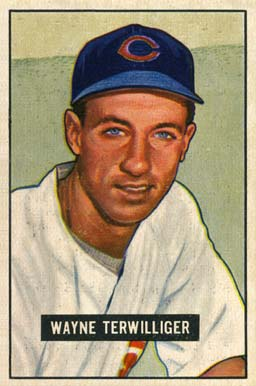
Wayne Terwilliger

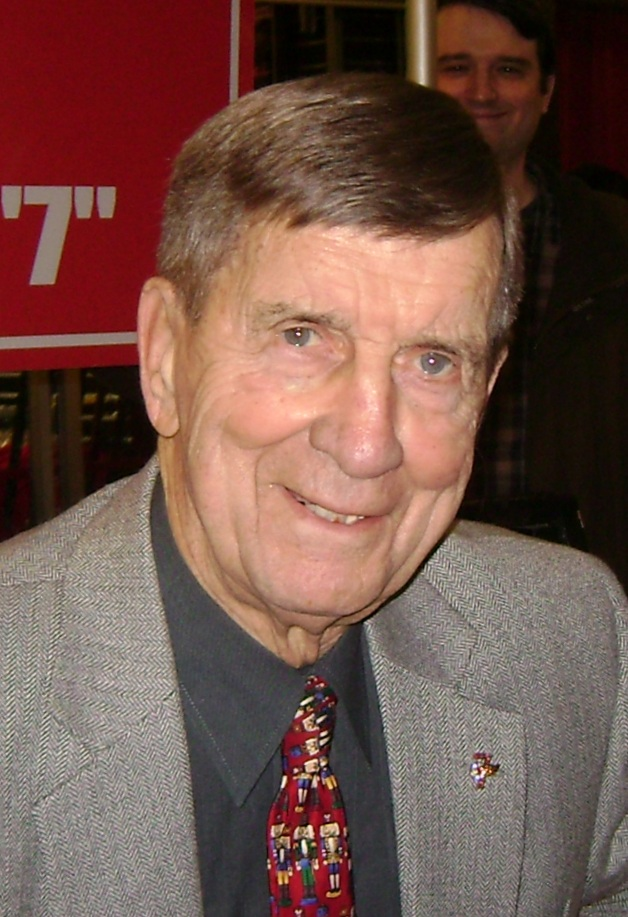
Ted Lindsay

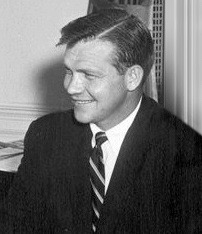
John Swainson

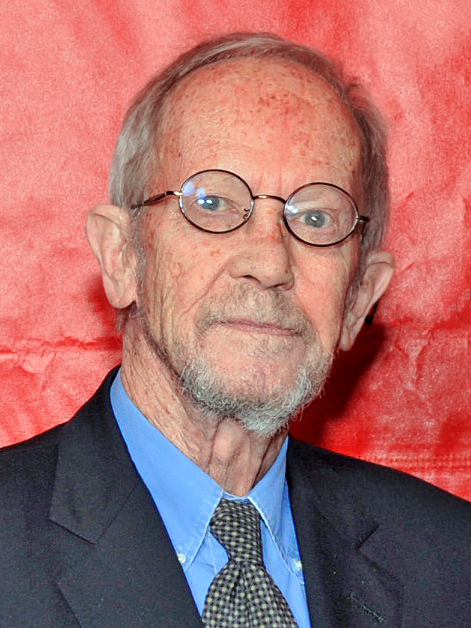
Elmore Leonard

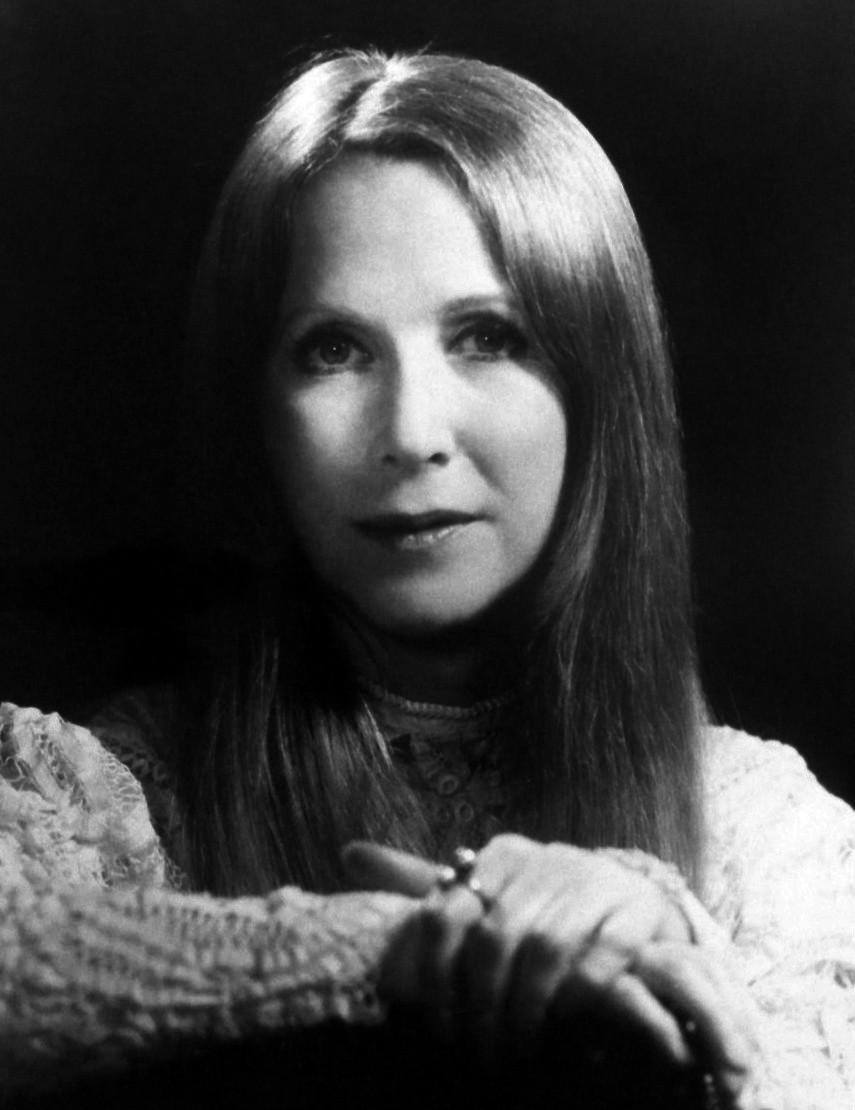
Julie Harris

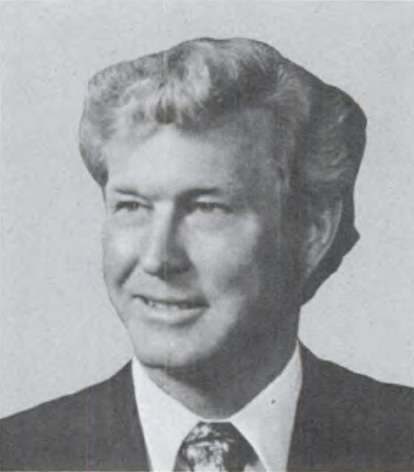
Donald J. Albosta

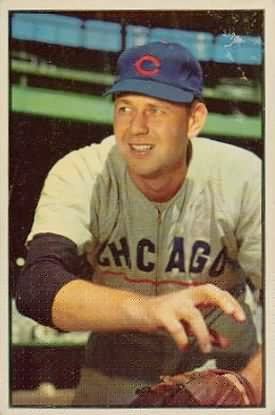
Bob Rush

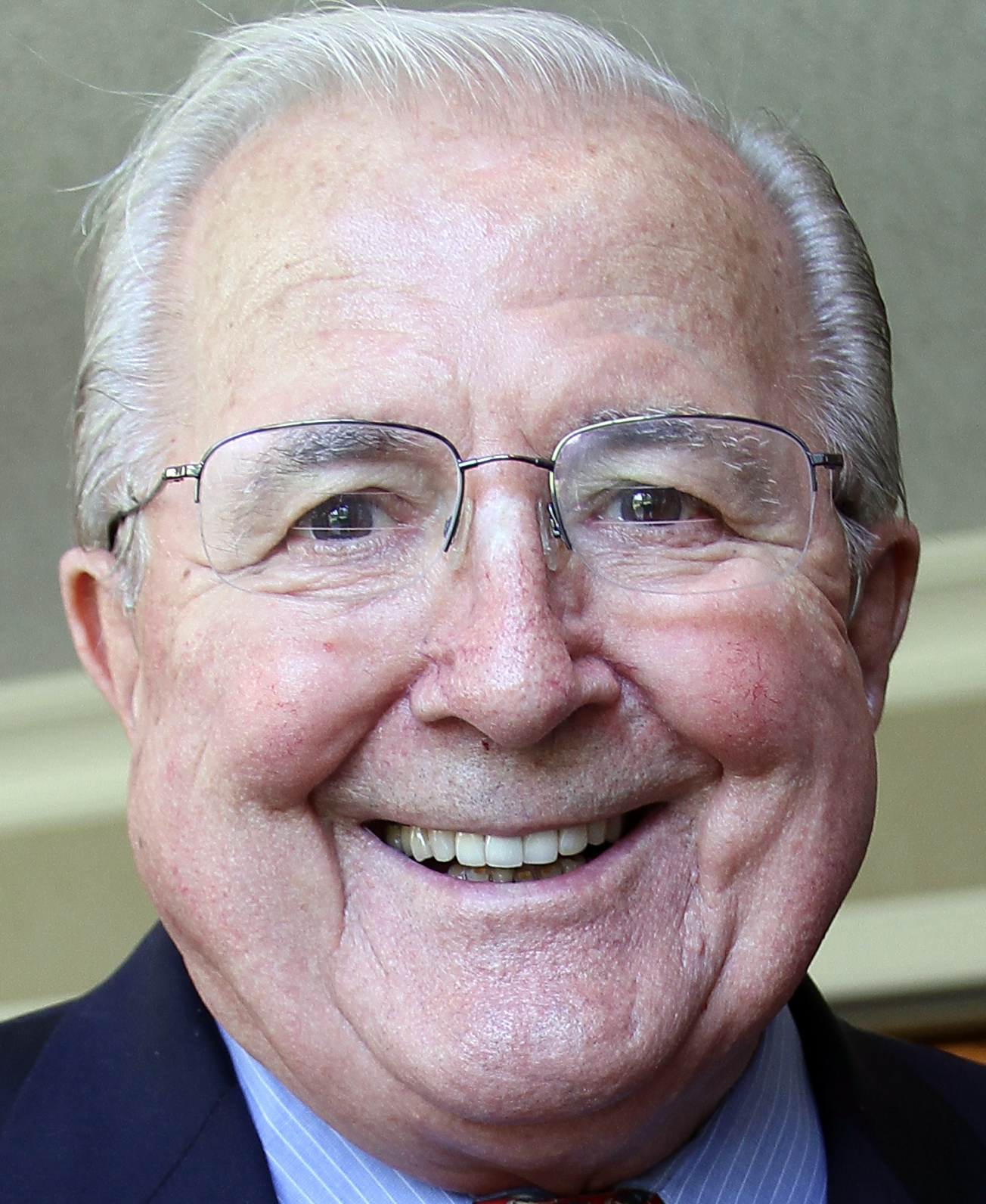
Roman Gribbs

== Deaths ==
- February 18 - Marion LeRoy Burton, President of the University of Michigan from 1920 to 1925, in Ann Arbor at age 50
- March 30 - William J. McConnell, Michigan native who became U.S. Senator from Idaho (1890-1891) and Governor of Idaho (1893-1897), at age 85 in Moscow, Idaho
- September 11 - Patrick H. Kelly, Lieutenant Governor (1907-1911) and U.S. Congressman (1913-1925), at age 57 in Washington, D.C.
- November 5 - Samuel Dickie, Chairman of the Prohibition Party (1887-1899), at age 74 in Albion
- November 13 - George A. Loud, U.S. Congressman (1903-1917), at age 73 in Myrtle Point, Oregon

=== Gallery of 1925 deaths ===
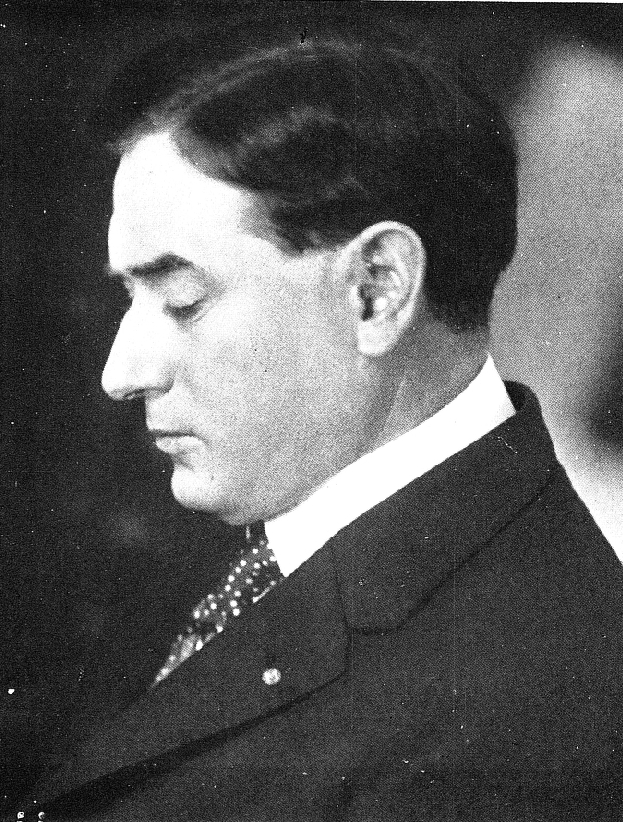
Marion LeRoy Burton

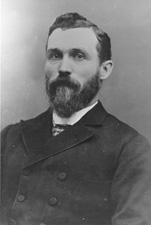
William J. McConnell

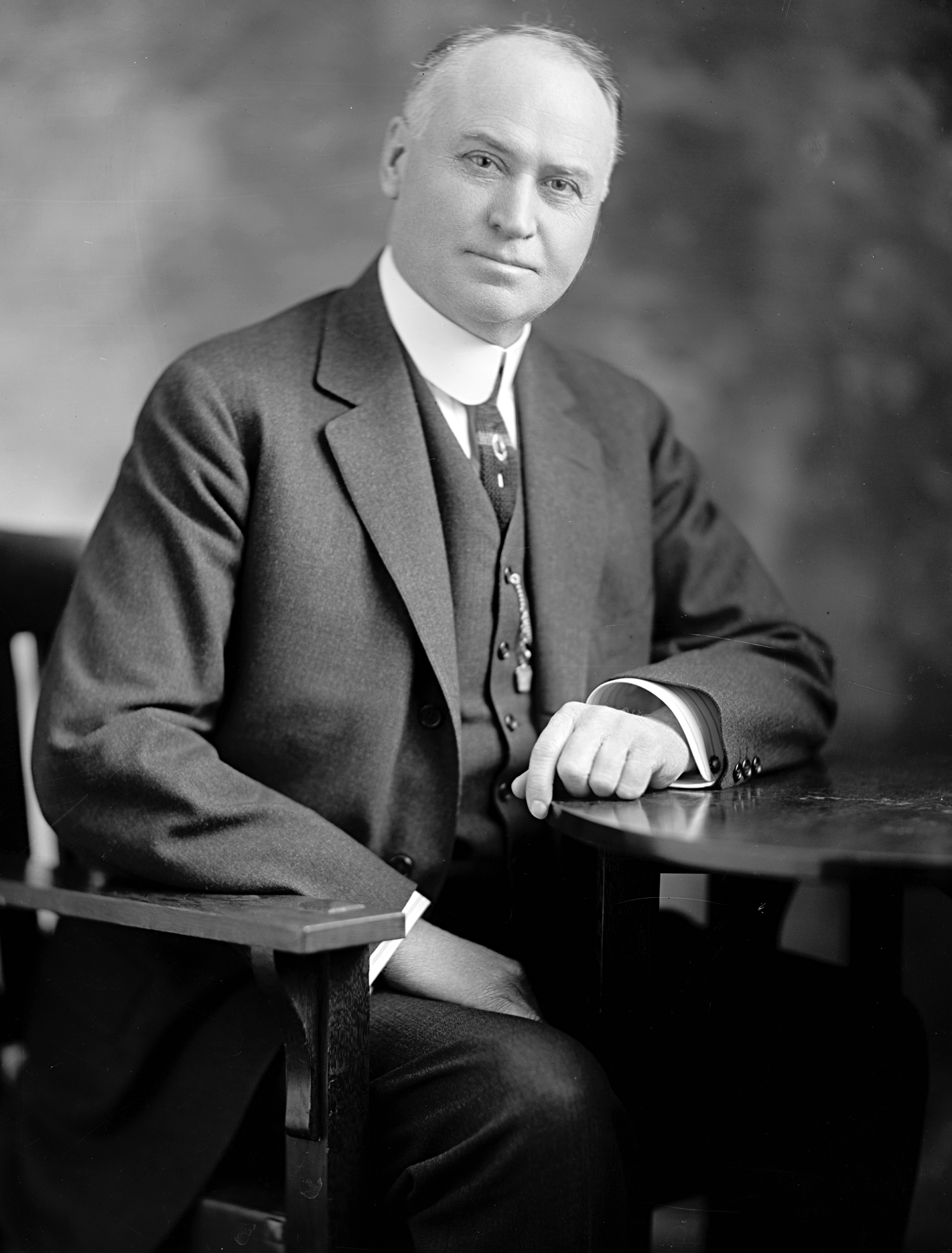
Patrick H. Kelly

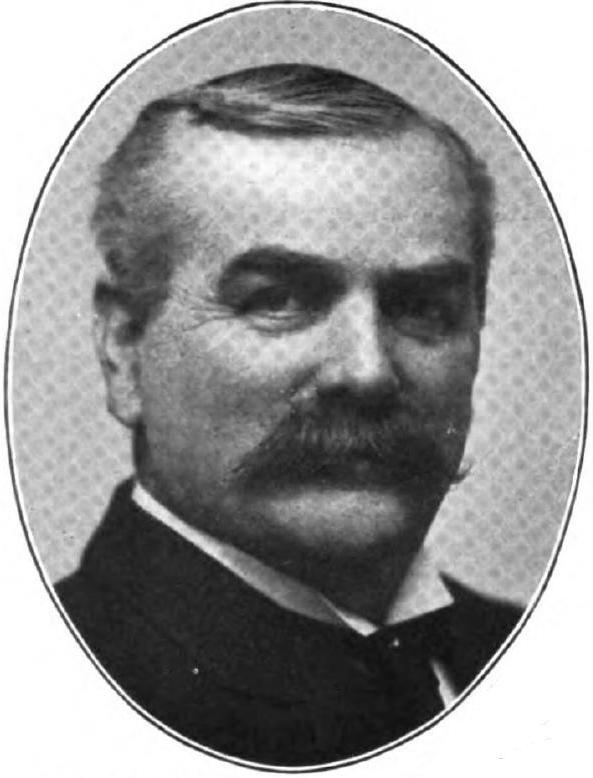
George A. Loud

== See also ==
- History of Michigan
- History of Detroit
