= 1930 in Michigan =

- Decades: 1910s; 1920s; 1930s; 1940s; 1950s
- See also: History of Michigan; Historical outline of Michigan; List of years in Michigan; 1930 in the United States

This article covers events from the year 1930 in Michigan.

== Office holders ==
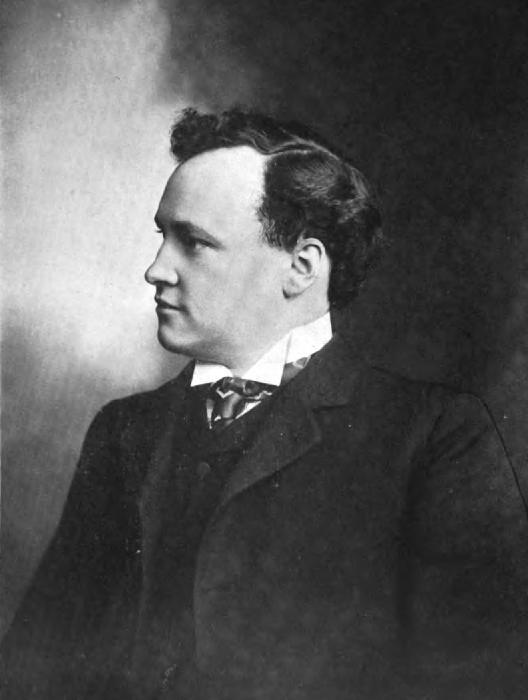
Fred W. Green

=== State office holders ===
- Governor of Michigan: Fred W. Green (Republican)
- Lieutenant Governor of Michigan: Luren Dickinson (Republican)
- Michigan Attorney General: Wilber M. Brucker (Republican)
- Michigan Secretary of State: John S. Haggerty (Republican)
- Speaker of the Michigan House of Representatives: Fred R. Ming (Republican)
- Chief Justice, Michigan Supreme Court: Henry M. Butzel

=== Mayors of major cities ===
- Mayor of Detroit: Charles Bowles (Republican)
- Mayor of Grand Rapids: John D. Karel
- Mayor of Flint: Harvey J. Mallery
- Mayor of Lansing: Laird J. Troyer
- Mayor of Saginaw: Ben N. Mercer
- Mayor of Ann Arbor: Edward W. Staebler

=== Federal office holders ===
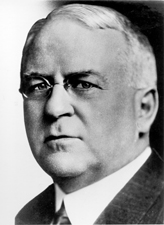
Sen. James Couzens

- U.S. Senator from Michigan: James J. Couzens (Republican)
- U.S. Senator from Michigan: Arthur Vandenberg (Republican)
- House District 1: Robert H. Clancy (Republican)
- House District 2: Earl C. Michener (Republican)
- House District 3: Joseph L. Hooper (Republican)
- House District 4: John C. Ketcham (Republican)
- House District 5: Carl E. Mapes (Republican)
- House District 6: Grant M. Hudson (Republican)
- House District 7: Louis C. Cramton (Republican)
- House District 8: Bird J. Vincent (Republican)
- House District 9: James C. McLaughlin (Republican)
- House District 10: Roy O. Woodruff (Republican)
- House District 11: Frank P. Bohn (Republican)
- House District 12: W. Frank James (Republican)
- House District 13: Clarence J. McLeod (Republican)

== Population ==
In the 1930 United States census, Michigan was recorded as having a population of 4,842,325, ranking as the seventh most populous state in the country. By 1940, Michigan's population had increased by 8.5% to 5,256,106.

=== Cities ===
The following is a list of cities in Michigan with a population of at least 20,000 based on 1930 U.S. Census data. Historic census data from 1920 and 1940 is included to reflect trends in population increases or decreases. Cities that are part of the Detroit metropolitan area are shaded in tan.

1930 Rank	City	County	1920 Pop.	1930 Pop.	1940 Pop.	Change 1930-40
1	Detroit	Wayne	993,678	1,568,662	1,623,452	3.5%
2	Grand Rapids	Kent	137,634	168,592	164,292	−2.6%
3	Flint	Genesee	91,599	156,492	151,543	−3.2%
4	Saginaw	Saginaw	61,903	80,715	82,794	2.6%
5	Lansing	Ingham	57,327	78,397	78,753	0.5%
6	Pontiac	Oakland	34,273	64,928	66,626	2.6%
7	Hamtramck	Wayne	48,615	56,268	49,839	−11.4%
8	Jackson	Jackson	48,374	55,187	49,656	−10.0%
9	Kalamazoo	Kalamazoo	48,487	54,786	54,097	−1.3%
10	Highland Park	Wayne	46,499	52,959	50,810	−4.1%
11	Dearborn	Wayne	2,470	50,358	63,589	26.3%
12	Bay City	Bay	47,554	47,355	47,956	1.3%
13	Battle Creek	Calhoun	36,164	45,573	43,453	−4.7%
14	Muskegon	Muskegon	36,570	41,390	47,697	15.2%
15	Port Huron	St. Clair	25,944	31,361	32,759	4.5%
16	Wyandotte	Wayne	13,851	28,368	30,618	7.9%
17	Ann Arbor	Washtenaw	19,516	26,944	29,815	10.7%
18	Royal Oak	Oakland	6,007	22,904	25,087	9.5%
19	Ferndale	Oakland	2,640	20,855	22,523	8.0%

=== Counties ===
The following is a list of counties in Michigan with populations of at least 50,000 based on 1930 U.S. Census data. Historic census data from 1920 and 1940 are included to reflect trends in population increases or decreases.

1930 Rank	County	Largest city	1920 Pop.	1930 Pop.	1940 Pop.	Change 1930-40
1	Wayne	Detroit	1,177,645	1,888,946	2,015,623	6.7%
2	Kent	Grand Rapids	183,041	240,511	246,338	2.4%
3	Genesee	Flint	125,668	211,641	227,944	7.7%
4	Oakland	Pontiac	90,050	211,251	254,068	20.3%
5	Saginaw	Saginaw	100,286	120,717	130,468	8.1%
6	Ingham	Lansing	81,554	116,587	130,616	12.0%
7	Jackson	Jackson	72,539	92,304	93,108	0.9%
8	Kalamazoo	Kalamazoo	71,225	91,368	100,085	9.5%
9	Calhoun	Battle Creek	72,918	87,043	94,206	8.2%
10	Muskegon	Muskegon	62,362	84,630	94,501	11.7%
11	Berrien	Benton Harbor	62,653	81,066	89,117	9.9%
12	Macomb	Warren	38,103	77,146	107,638	39.5%
13	Bay	Bay City	69,548	69,474	74,981	7.9%
14	St. Clair	Port Huron	58,009	67,563	76,222	12.8%
15	Washtenaw	Ann Arbor	49,520	65,530	80,810	23.3%
16	Ottawa	Holland	47,660	54,858	59,660	8.8%
17	Houghton	Houghton	71,930	52,851	47,631	−9.9%
18	Monroe	Monroe	37,115	52,485	58,620	11.7%
19	Lenawee	Adrian	47,767	49,849	53,110	6.5%

== Sports ==
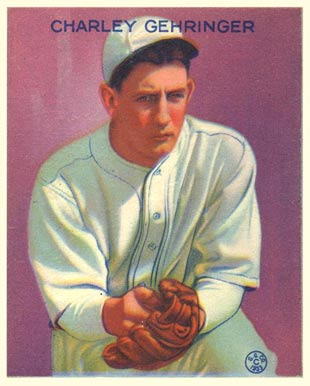
Charlie Gehringer

=== Baseball ===
- 1930 Detroit Tigers season – Under manager Bucky Harris, the Tigers compiled a 75–79 record and finished in fifth place in the American League. The team's statistical leaders included Charlie Gehringer with a .330 batting average, 47 doubles, and 15 triples, Dale Alexander with 20 home runs and 135 RBIs, Earl Whitehill with 17 wins, and Whit Wyatt with a 3.57 earned run average.
- 1930 Michigan Wolverines baseball season - Under head coach Ray Fisher, the Wolverines compiled a 9–15–1 record.

=== American football ===
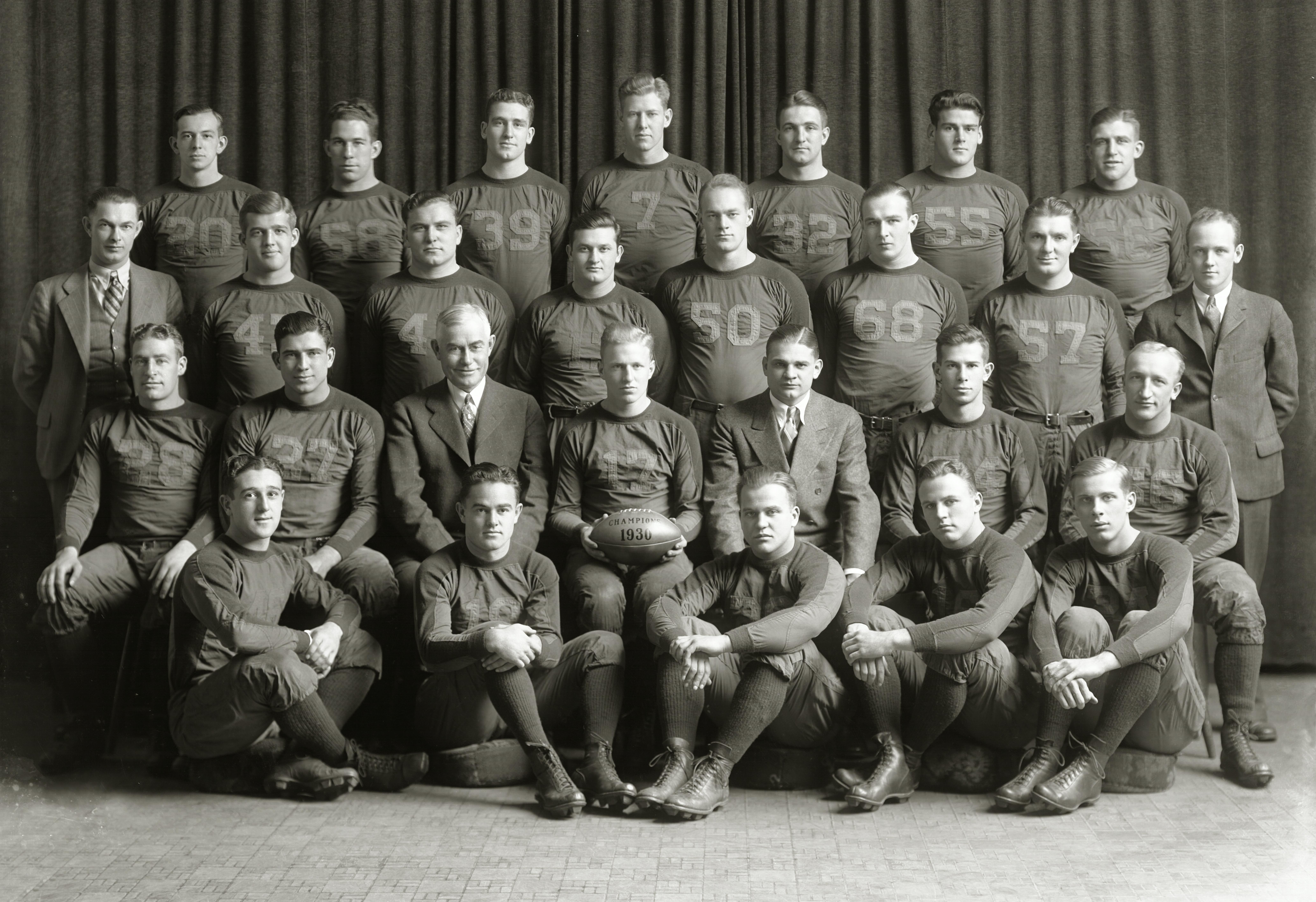
1930 Michigan football team

- 1930 Michigan Wolverines football team – The Wolverines compiled an 8–0–1 record and tied for the Big Ten Conference championship.
- 1930 Michigan State Normal Hurons football team – Under head coach Elton Rynearson, the Hurons compiled a record of 6–1, won the Michigan Collegiate Conference championship, and outscored opponents by a total of 145 to 14.
- 1930 Michigan State Spartans football team – Under head coach Jim Crowley, the Spartans compiled a 5–1–2 record.
- 1930 Western State Hilltoppers football team – Under head coach Mike Gary, the Hilltoppers compiled a 5–1–1 record and outscored opponents, 192 to 25.
- 1930 Central State Bearcats football team – Under head coach Butch Nowack, the Bearcats compiled a 6–2 record and outscored opponents by a total of 108 to 81.
- 1930 Detroit Titans football team – The Titans compiled a 5–3–2 record under head coach Gus Dorais.

=== Basketball ===
- 1929–30 Western Michigan Broncos men's basketball team – Under head coach Buck Read, the Broncos compiled a perfect 17–0 record.
- 1929–30 Michigan State Spartans men's basketball team – Under head coach Benjamin Van Alstyne, the Spartans compiled a 12–4 record.
- 1929–30 Michigan Wolverines men's basketball team – Under head coach George Veenker, the Wolverines compiled a 9–5 record.
- 1920–30 Detroit Titans men's basketball team – Under head coach Louis Conroy, the Titans compiled a 10–9 record.

=== Ice hockey ===
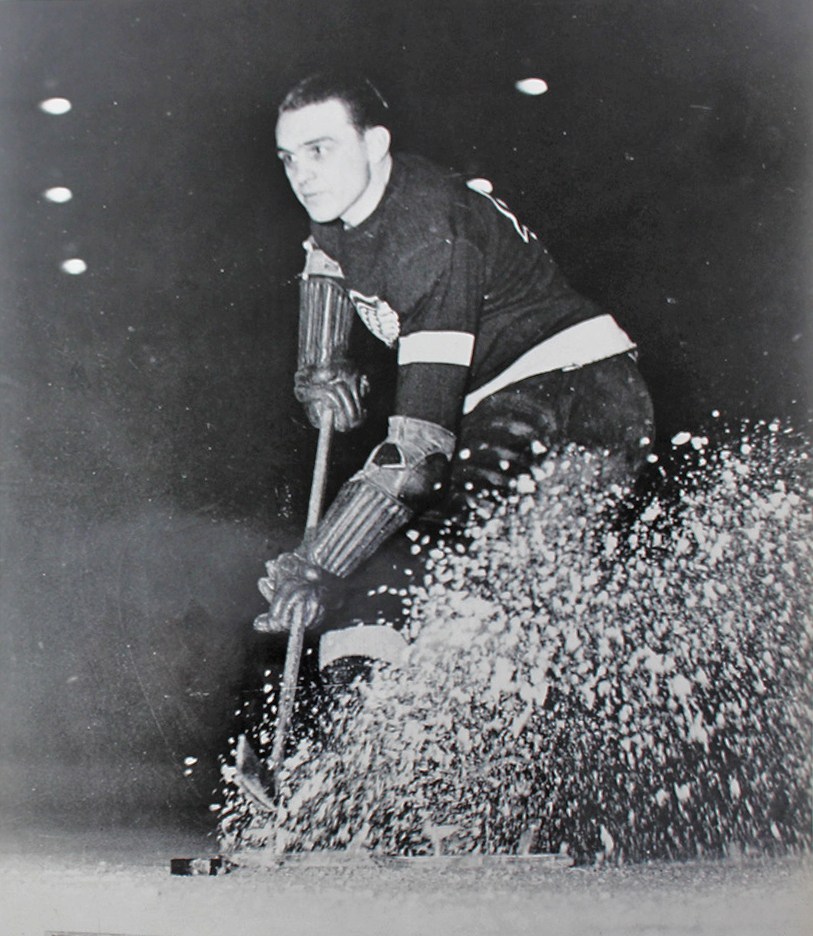
Herbie Lewis

- 1929–30 Detroit Cougars season – Under general manager and coach Jack Adams, the Red Wings compiled a 14–24–6 record. The team's statistical leaders included Herbie Lewis with 20 goals and Carson Cooper with 18 assists and 36 points. Bill Beveridge was the team's goaltender.
- 1929–30 Michigan Wolverines men's ice hockey team – Under head coach Ed Lowrey, the Wolverines compiled a 12–7–2 record.
- 1929–30 Michigan College of Mines and Technology men's ice hockey team – Under head coach Bert Noblet, the Michigan College of Mines and Technology (later renamed Michigan Technological University) team compiled a 2–7 record.
- 1929–30 Michigan State Spartans men's ice hockey team – Under head coach John Kobs, the Spartans compiled a 1–4 record.

=== Other ===
- Harmsworth Cup – On September 1, Gar Wood won the Harmsworth Cup driving the Miss America IX on the Detroit River with a record average speed of 77.390 miles per hour.
- Port Huron to Mackinac Boat Race –

== Chronology of events ==
=== November ===
- November 4 - A number of elections occurred, including:
  - United States Senate - Republican James J. Couzens was re-elected.
  - United States House of Representatives - All 13 of Michigan's U.S. Representatives won re-election except for Grant M. Hudson in Michigan's 6th congressional district, who was not renominated and was replaced by fellow Republican, Seymour H. Person, and Louis C. Cramton in Michigan's 7th congressional district, who was also not renominated and was replaced by fellow Republican, Jesse P. Wolcott. The delegation remained entirely Republican.
  - Michigan Governor - Republican nominee, Wilber M. Brucker, defeated Democratic nominee William Comstock.

== Births ==
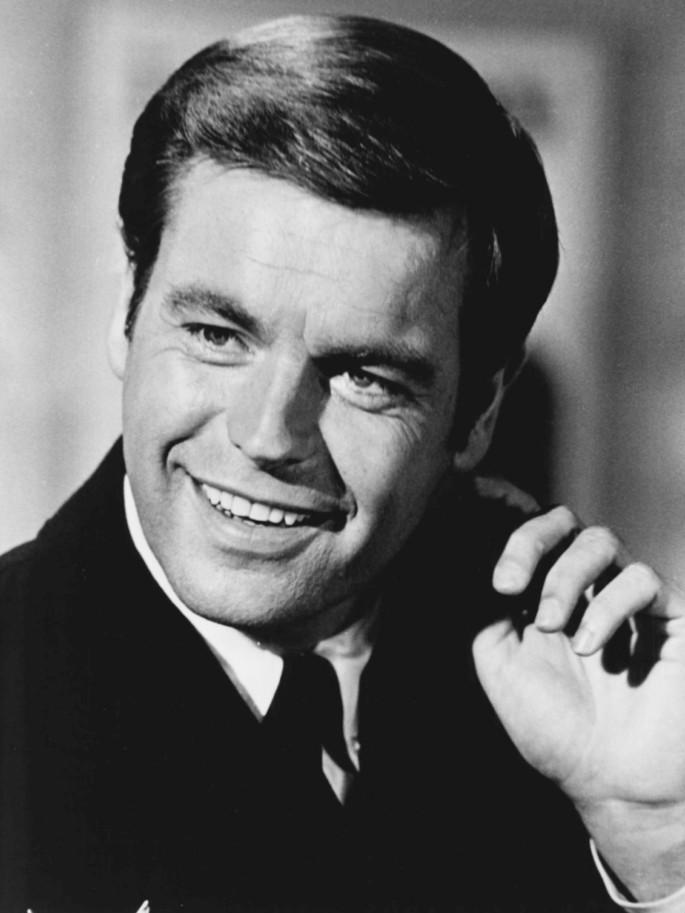
Robert Wagner

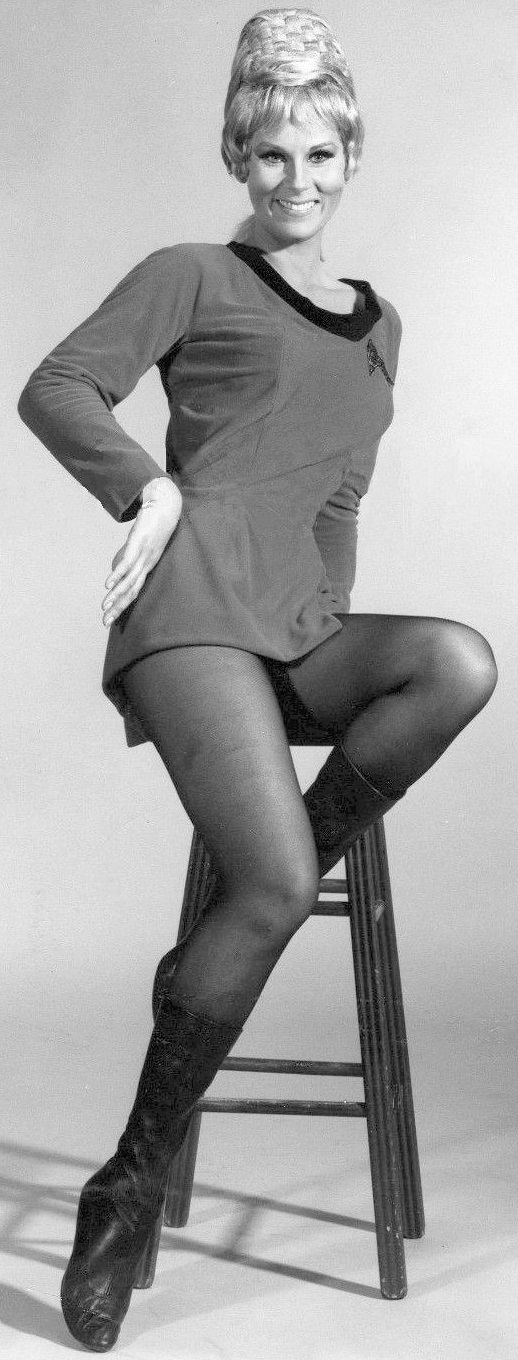
Grace Lee Whitney

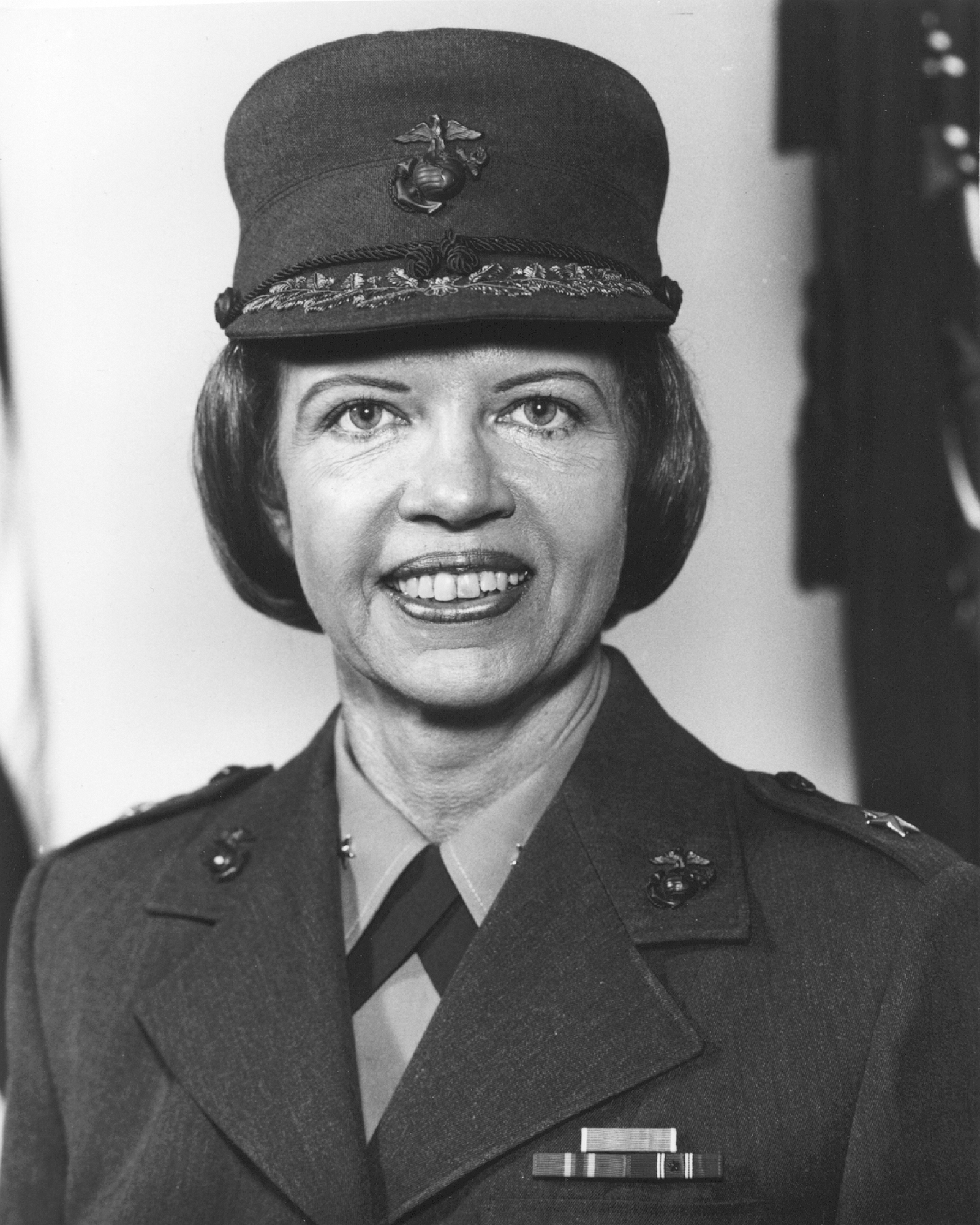
Margaret Brewer

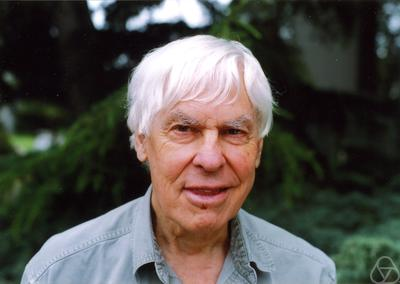
Stephen Smale

- January 2 - Andy McDonald, football player and coach (Northern Arizona 1965-68), in Flint
- January 9 - Charles Kettles, United States Army lieutenant colonel and Medal of Honor recipient for heroism in Vietnam War, in Ypsilanti
- January 24 - Donald E. Stewart, Academy Award winning screenwriter (Missing, The Hunt for Red October, Patriot Games), in Detroit
- January 26 - Thomas Gumbleton, auxiliary bishop of Detroit known for his anti-war protests during Vietnam War and his advocacy on behalf of homosexuals, in Detroit
- February 8 - Bob Carey, football player at Michigan State and in the NFL, in Charlevoix, Michigan
- February 10 - Robert Wagner, actor (It Takes a Thief, Hart to Hart), in Detroit
- February 26 - Tom Saidock, football player at Michigan State and in the NFL, in Detroit
- February 28 - Robert John Rose, Roman Catholic Bishop of Gaylord (1981–89) and Grand Rapids (1989–2003), in Grand Rapids
- March 9 - Thomas Schippers, conductor known for his work with the New York Philharmonic, Chicago Symphony Orchestra, Cincinnati Symphony Orchestra, and Metropolitan Opera, in Kalamazoo
- March 13 - Harrison Young, film and television actor (elderly Pvt. Ryan in Saving Private Ryan), in Port Huron
- March 15 - Wilma Vaught, first woman to deploy with an Air Force bomber unit and the first woman to reach the rank of brigadier general, in Pontiac
- March 26 - Franklin H. Westervelt, pioneer in the use computers in engineering education, in Benton Harbor, Michigan
- March 28 - Robert Ashley, composer best known for his operas and other theatrical works, many of which incorporated electronics and extended techniques, in Ann Arbor
- April 1 - Grace Lee Whitney, actress (yeoman Janice Rand on Star Trek), in Ann Arbor
- May 31 - Gary Brandner, horror fiction writer (The Howling trilogy of novels), in Sault Ste. Marie, Michigan
- July 1 - Margaret A. Brewer, first female in the United States Marine Corps to reach the rank of general officer, in Durand, Michigan
- July 8 - Earl Van Dyke, main keyboardist for Motown's in-house Funk Brothers band during the late 1960s and early 1970s, in Detroit
- July 15 - Stephen Smale, mathematician specializing in dynamical systems and mathematical economics who was awarded the Fields Medal in 1966, in Flint
- October 4 - James Callahan, film and television actor from 1959 to 2006 (Charles in Charge and M*A*S*H: Sometimes You Hear the Bullet), in Grand Rapids
- October 10 - Ray Truant, played on two Grey Cup championship teams in the Canadian Football League, in Detroit
- October 19 - Joe Koppe, Major League Baseball shortstop from 1958 to 1965, in Detroit
- November 25 - Clarke Scholes, winner of gold medal in 100-meter freestyle swimming at 1952 Summer Olympics, in Detroit

== Deaths ==
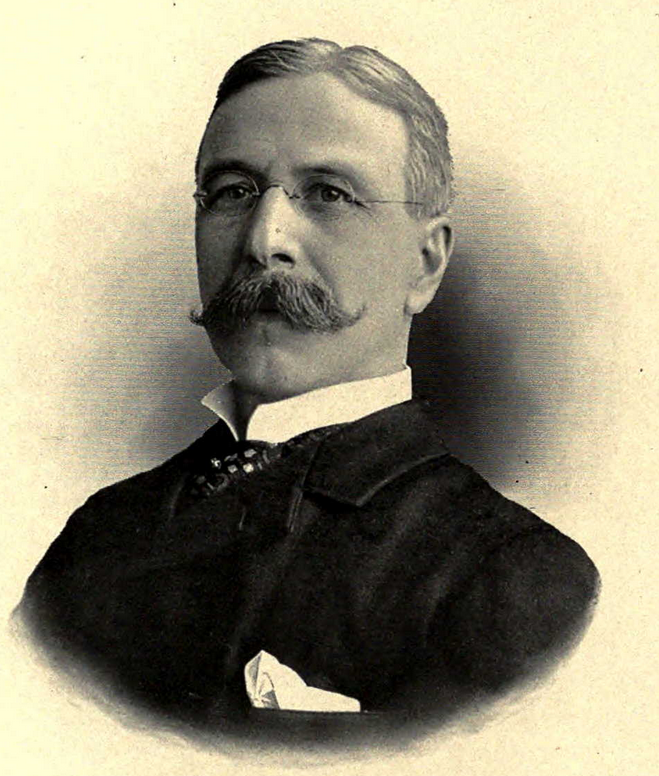
Harry Burns Hutchins

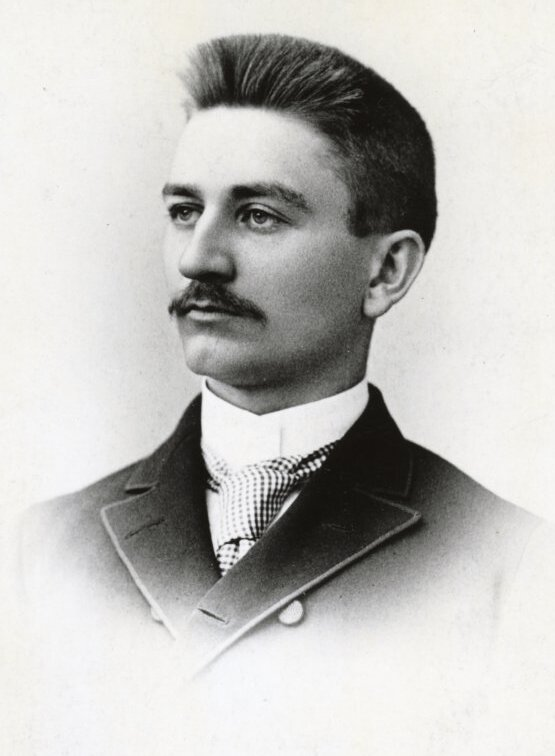
Herbert Henry Dow

- January 25 - Harry Burns Hutchins, President of the University of Michigan (1909–1920), at age 83 in Ann Arbor
- February 14 - Salvatore Catalanotte, an Italian-American mobster and boss of Detroit's Unione Siciliana from 1920 to 1930, in Detroit
- March 21 - Claude H. Van Tyne, University of Michigan history professor who won Pulitzer Prize for The War of Independence, at age 60 in Ann Arbor
- April 5 - Samuel Halpert, painter and head the painting department at the School of the Detroit Society of Arts and Crafts, in Detroit
- April 14 - Frank Kitson, Major League Baseball pitcher (1898-1907), at age 61 at his farm outside of Allegan, Michigan
- April 23 - Larry Twitchell, Major League Baseball pitcher, compiled an 11-1 record for the National League champion Detroit Wolverines in 1887 while batting .333, at age 68 in Cleveland
- May 26 - David D. Aitken, U.S. Congressman (1893-1897) and Mayor of Flint (1904-1905), at age 76 in Flint
- May 31 - Gaspar Milazzo, a.k.a. Gaspari Lombardo, a major organized-crime figure in Detroit during the Prohibition era, in a barrage of shotgun blasts at the Vernor Highway Fish Market in Detroit
- October 15 - Herbert Henry Dow, inventor of chemical processes, compounds, and products, and founder of Dow Chemical, at the Mayo Clinic in Rochester, Minnesota
- October 24 - Joseph Boyer, businessman who moved the Burroughs Adding Machine Company from St. Louis to Detroit, in Detroit
- December 8 - Julius Rolshoven, painter and Detroit native, at age 72 at St. Luke's Hospital in New York City
- December 20 - Gerrit J. Diekema, U.S. Congressman (1885-1891), at age 71 at The Hague, Netherlands
- Full date unknown - Charles H. Manly, American Civil War veteran, member of the Michigan House of Representatives (1887–1888), Mayor of Ann Arbor (1890–1891), hit by train around age 86-87 in Jackson

== See also ==
- History of Michigan
- History of Detroit
