= 1927 Central Michigan Bearcats football team =

American college football season

1927 Central Michigan Bearcats football
- Conference: Michigan Collegiate Conference
- Record: 7–1 (2–1 MCC)
- Head coach: Wallace Parker (5th season)
- Captain: George Hackett
- Home stadium: Tambling Field

1927 Michigan Collegiate Conference football standings
	Conf.					Overall
Team	W		L		T	W		L		T
Michigan State Normal $	3	–	0	–	0	8	–	0	–	0
Central Michigan	2	–	1	–	0	7	–	1	–	0
Western State Teachers	1	–	2	–	0	3	–	4	–	0
Detroit City College	0	–	3	–	0	2	–	6	–	0
$ – Conference champion

The 1927 Central State Bearcats football team represented Central State Teachers College, later renamed Central Michigan University, in the Michigan Collegiate Conference (MCC) during the 1927 college football season. In their fifth season under head coach Wallace Parker, the Bearcats compiled a 7–1 record (2–1 against MCC opponents), shut out four of eight opponents, and outscored all opponents by a combined total of 124 to 37. The team lost to its in-state rival Michigan State Normal (0–6).

== Schedule ==
Date	Opponent	Site	Result	Source
October 1	Adrian	Mount Pleasant, MI	W 26–0	
October 8	Ferris Institute	Mount Pleasant, MI	W 20–0	
October 15	Olivet	Mount Pleasant, MI	W 7–0	
October 22	Western State Teachers^{†}	Tambling Field; Mount Pleasant, MI (rivalry)	W 18–12	
October 29	at Michigan State Normal	Ypsilanti, MI (rivalry)	L 0–6	
November 5	at Northern State Teachers (MI)	Marquette, MI	W 6–0	
November 11	at Alma	Alma, MI	W 14–13	
November 24	at Detroit City College	Detroit, MI	W 33–6	
^{†}Homecoming
