= 1927 Michigan State Normal Normalites football team =

American college football season

1927 Michigan State Normal Normalites football

MCC champion
- Conference: Michigan Collegiate Conference
- Record: 8–0 (3–0 MCC)
- Head coach: Elton Rynearson (6th season)
- Captain: Kenneth J. Matheson
- Home stadium: Normal Field

1927 Michigan Collegiate Conference football standings
	Conf.					Overall
Team	W		L		T	W		L		T
Michigan State Normal $	3	–	0	–	0	8	–	0	–	0
Central Michigan	2	–	1	–	0	7	–	1	–	0
Western State Teachers	1	–	2	–	0	3	–	4	–	0
Detroit City College	0	–	3	–	0	2	–	6	–	0
$ – Conference champion

The 1927 Michigan State Normal Normalites football team was an American football team that represented Michigan State Normal School (later renamed Eastern Michigan University) during the 1927 college football season. In their sixth season under head coach Elton Rynearson, the Normalites compiled a perfect 8–0 record, won the Michigan Collegiate Conference championship, shut out six of eight opponents, and outscored all opponents by a combined total of 186 to 13. The team played its home games at Normal Field on the school's campus in Ypsilanti, Michigan.

== Schedule ==
Date	Opponent	Site	Result	Source
October 1	Olivet*	Normal Field; Ypsilanti, MI	W 20–0	
October 8	at Northern Illinois*	Glidden Field; DeKalb, IL	W 25–6	
October 15	at Assumption (ON)*	Windsor, ON	W 26–7	
October 22	Valparaiso*	Normal Field; Ypsilanti, MI	W 44–0	
October 29	Central Michigan	Normal Field; Ypsilanti, MI (rivalry)	W 6–0	
November 5	at Adrian*	Adrian, MI	W 20–0	
November 12	at Western State Teachers (MI)	Kalamazoo, MI	W 6–0	
November 19	Detroit City College	Normal Field; Ypsilanti, MI	W 39–0	
*Non-conference game
