= 1927 Western State Teachers Hilltoppers football team =

American college football season

1927 Western State Teachers Hilltoppers football
- Conference: Michigan Collegiate Conference
- Record: 3–4 (1–2 MCC)
- Head coach: Earl Martineau (4th season)
- Captain: George Fulgoni

1927 Michigan Collegiate Conference football standings
	Conf.					Overall
Team	W		L		T	W		L		T
Michigan State Normal $	3	–	0	–	0	8	–	0	–	0
Central Michigan	2	–	1	–	0	7	–	1	–	0
Western State Teachers	1	–	2	–	0	3	–	4	–	0
Detroit City College	0	–	3	–	0	2	–	6	–	0
$ – Conference champion

The 1927 Western State Teachers Hilltoppers football team represented Western State Teachers College (later renamed Western Michigan University) as an independent during the 1927 college football season. In their fourth season under head coach Earl Martineau, the Hilltoppers compiled a 3–4 record and outscored their opponents, 100 to 72. Halfback/center George Fulgoni was the team captain.

== Schedule ==
Date	Opponent	Site	Result	Source
October 8	at Lombard	Galesburg, IL	L 6–18	
October 15	Notre Dame reserves		L 0–18	
October 22	at Central Michigan	Tambling Field; Mount Pleasant, MI (rivalry)	L 12–18	
October 29	Detroit City College	Western State Teachers College Field; Kalamazoo, MI	W 44–0	
November 5	at Oshkosh State	Fairgrounds; Oshkosh, WI	W 19–6	
November 12	Michigan State Normal	Western State Teachers College Field; Kalamazoo, MI	L 0–6	
November 26	at Albion	Albion, MI	W 19–0	
