= Ray Truant =

Canadian football player

Profile
- Position: Halfback

Personal information
- Born: October 10, 1930; Detroit, Michigan, U.S.
- Died: October 15, 2018 (aged 88); Brantford, Ontario, Canada
- Listed height: 5 ft 10 in (1.78 m)
- Listed weight: 175 lb (79 kg)

Career history
- 1953–1957: Hamilton Tiger-Cats

Awards and highlights
- Grey Cup champion (1953, 1957)

Ray Truant (October 10, 1930 – October 15, 2018) was a Canadian football player who played for the Hamilton Tiger-Cats. He won the Grey Cup with them in 1953 and 1957. Born in Detroit, Michigan and raised in Windsor, Ontario, he previously attended and played football at the University of Western Ontario and Kennedy Collegiate Institute in his hometown. Truant is a member of the Windsor/Essex County Sports Hall of Fame, Brantford Sports Hall of Fame, and the University of Western Ontario Sports Hall of Fame.
