= Frank D. Scott =

American politician

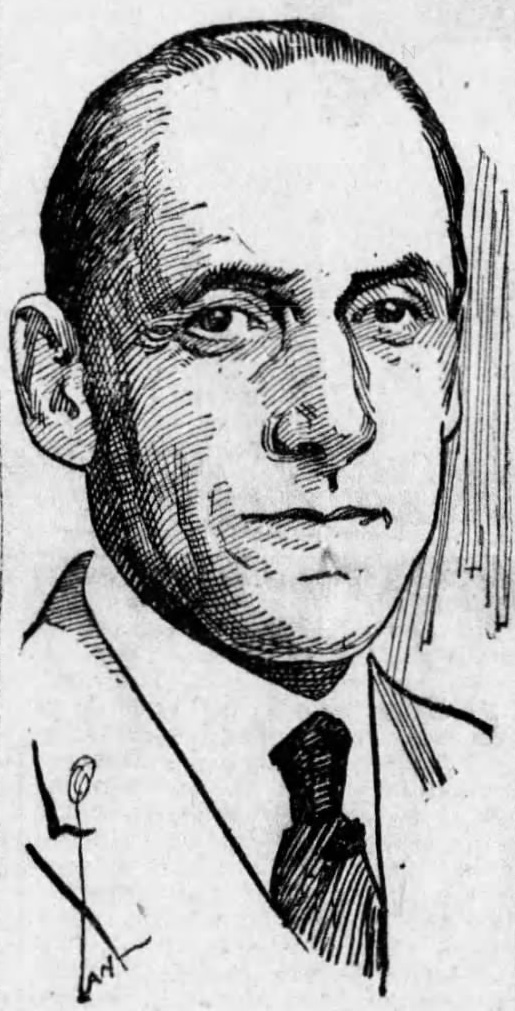
- From the September 27, 1925 edition of the Arizona Daily Star newspaper.

Member of the U.S. House of Representatives from Michigan's 11th district
- In office March 4, 1915 – March 3, 1927
- Preceded by: Francis O. Lindquist
- Succeeded by: Frank P. Bohn

Personal details
- Born: Frank Douglas Scott; August 25, 1878 Alpena, Michigan, U.S.
- Died: February 12, 1951 (aged 72) Palm Beach, Florida, U.S.
- Party: Republican
- Education: University of Michigan

Frank Douglas Scott (August 25, 1878 – February 12, 1951) was a politician from the U.S. state of Michigan.

Scott was born of Scottish ancestry in Alpena, Michigan, attended the public schools and graduated from the law department of the University of Michigan at Ann Arbor in 1901. He was admitted to the bar the same year and commenced practice in Alpena, serving as city attorney 1903-1904 and city prosecutor 1906–1910. He also served as a member of the Michigan Senate from the 29th district, 1911–1914 and served as president pro tempore in 1913 and 1914.

In 1914, Scott was elected as a Republican from Michigan's 11th congressional district to the 64th Congress. He was subsequently re-elected to the five succeeding Congresses serving from March 4, 1915, to March 3, 1927, in the U.S. House. During the 69th Congress, he was chairman of the Committee on Merchant Marine and Fisheries. He was an unsuccessful candidate for re-nomination in 1926, being defeated by fellow Republican Frank P. Bohn in the primaries.

After leaving Congress, Frank D. Scott resumed the practice of his profession in Washington, D.C. He was a member of Freemasons, Elks, and Odd Fellows. He died aged seventy-two in Palm Beach, Florida and is interred at Evergreen Cemetery of Alpena.

U.S. House of Representatives
Preceded by Francis O. Lindquist	United States Representative for the 11th congressional district of Michigan; 1915–1927	Succeeded by Frank P. Bohn
