= Charles J. DeLand =

American politician (1879–1943)

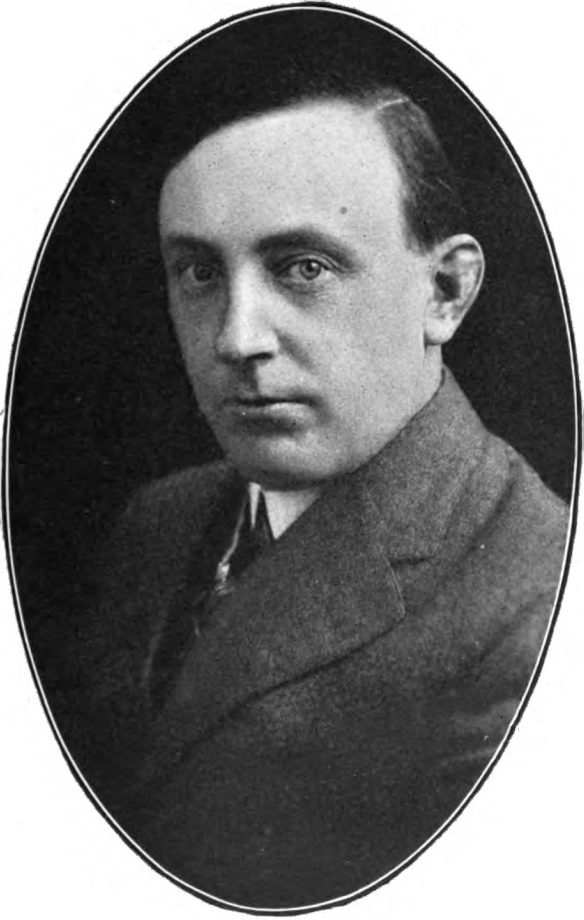

Member of the Michigan House of Representatives from the Wayne County 1st district
- In office January 1, 1929 – December 31, 1930

Michigan Secretary of State
- In office 1921–1926
- Governor: Alex J. Groesbeck
- Preceded by: Coleman C. Vaughan
- Succeeded by: John S. Haggerty

Member of the Michigan Senate from the 10th district
- In office January 1, 1915 – December 31, 1920
- Preceded by: J. Weston Hutchins
- Succeeded by: Burney Eslie Brower

Personal details
- Born: December 18, 1879 Saginaw, Michigan, U.S.
- Died: January 10, 1943 (aged 63) Detroit, Michigan, U.S.
- Resting place: Woodlawn Cemetery, Detroit
- Party: Republican
- Spouse: Jessie Alice Hutchins
- Education: Michigan Agricultural College

Charles Johnson DeLand (December 18, 1879 – January 10, 1943) was an American politician who served as the 28th Secretary of State of Michigan from 1921 to 1926 as a member of the Republican Party. He previously served in the Michigan Senate from 1915 to 1920 and subsequently served in the Michigan House of Representatives from 1929 to 1930.

== Early life ==
Charles J. DeLand was born in Saginaw, Michigan, on December 18, 1879, to parents Charles Victor Deland and Mary Elizabeth Deland.

== Education ==
DeLand was educated at Michigan State Agricultural College. DeLand began studying law in 1900.

== Career ==
In 1905, DeLand was admitted to the bar. DeLand served as chair of Jackson County Republican Party from 1906 to 1910. DeLand served as a delegate to the Michigan state constitutional convention representing the 10th district from 1907 to 1908. On November 3, 1914, DeLand was elected to the Michigan Senate where he represented the 10th district from January 6, 1915, to December 31, 1920. DeLand served as the Michigan Secretary of State from 1921 to 1926. On November 6, 1928, DeLand was elected to the Michigan House of Representatives where he represented the Wayne County 1st district from January 2, 1929, to December 31, 1930. In 1934 and 1940, DeLand was defeated when attempting to be re-elected to the state house. In 1932, DeLand was an unsuccessful candidate in the Republican primary for United States House of Representatives seat representing Michigan's 15th congressional district. DeLand was a delegate to Republican National Convention from Michigan in 1936.

== Personal life ==
DeLand married Jessie Alice Hutchins on September 26, 1905. Together they had a child. DeLand was a member of the Freemasons.

== Death ==
DeLand died on January 10, 1943, in Detroit, Michigan. DeLand was interred at Woodland Cemetery in Jackson, Michigan, on January 12, 1943.
