= Wallace Parker =

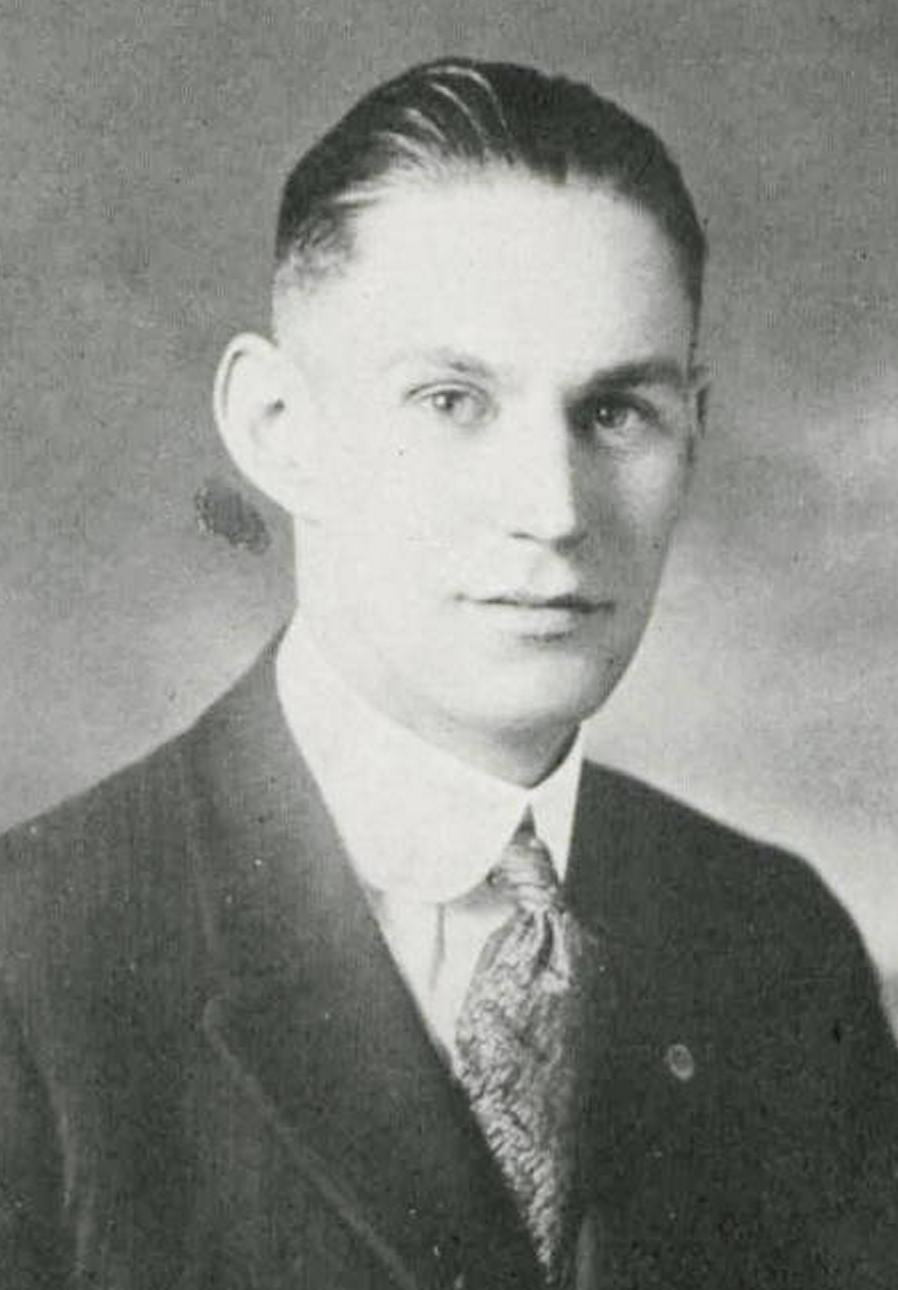
- Parker pictured in Chippewa 1922, Central Michigan yearbook

Biographical details
- Born: April 14, 1898; Chicago, Illinois, U.S.
- Died: August 23, 1972 (aged 74); Syracuse, New York, U.S.

Playing career

Football
- 1919–1920: Syracuse

Basketball
- 1919–1921: Syracuse

Baseball
- 1921: Syracuse
- Position: Guard (basketball)

Coaching career (HC unless noted)

Football
- 1921–1923: Central Michigan
- 1926–1928: Central Michigan / Central State (MI)

Basketball
- 1921–1924: Central Michigan
- 1926–1927: Central Michigan

Baseball
- 1922–1924: Central Michigan

Administrative career (AD unless noted)
- 1929–1934: Central State (MI)

Head coaching record
- Overall: 32–10–6 (football)

Howard Wallace Parker (April 14, 1898 – August 23, 1972), sometimes listed as Herbert Wallace Parker, was the head coach of the Central Michigan college football program from 1921 to 1923 and again from 1926 to 1928. He also served as Central Michigan's basketball coach, and later their athletic director. He played college football, basketball and baseball at Syracuse. He died in 1972 at age 74 in Syracuse, New York.

== Head coaching record ==
=== Football ===
Year	Team	Overall	Conference	Standing	Bowl/playoffs
Central Michigan Normalites (Independent) (1921–1923)
1921	Central Michigan	5–1–1			
1922	Central Michigan	6–0–2			
1923	Central Michigan	5–1–2			
Central Michigan Dragons (Independent) (1926)
1926	Central Michigan	3–4–1			
Central Michigan Bearcats / Central State Bearcats (Michigan Collegiate Conference) (1927–1928)
1927	Central Michigan	7–1	2–1	2nd	
1928	Central State	6–3	1–2		
Central Michigan:		32–10–6	3–3		
Total:		32–10–6			

== See also ==
- List of college football head coaches with non-consecutive tenure
