= Frank P. Bohn =

American politician (1866–1944)

Frank Bohn
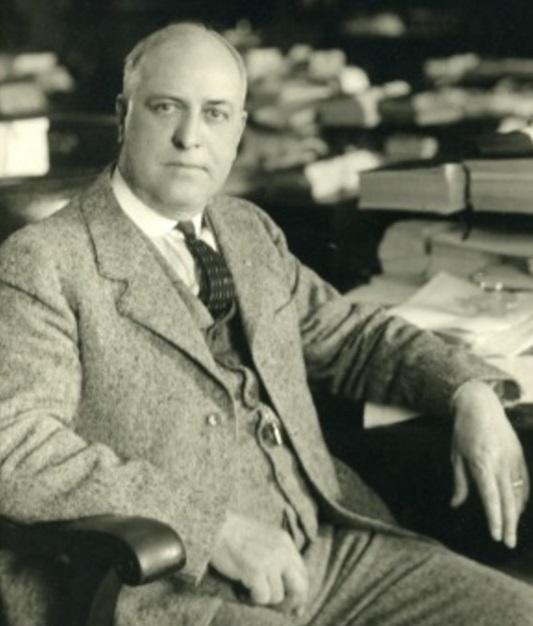
- Bohn in 1923

Member of the U.S. House of Representatives from Michigan's 11th district
- In office March 4, 1927 – March 3, 1933
- Preceded by: Frank D. Scott
- Succeeded by: Prentiss M. Brown

Member of the Michigan Senate from the 30th district
- In office 1923–1926
- Preceded by: William A. Lemire
- Succeeded by: Herbert J. Rushton

Personal details
- Born: July 14, 1866 Charlottesville, Indiana, U.S.
- Died: June 1, 1944 (aged 77) Newberry, Michigan, U.S
- Party: Republican

Frank Probasco Bohn (July 14, 1866 – June 1, 1944) was a politician from the U.S. state of Michigan. He served three terms in the United States House of Representatives from 1927 to 1933.

== Early life and education ==
Bohn was born in Charlottesville, Indiana, where he attended public high school. He attended Danville Normal College in Danville, Indiana, and graduated from the Medical College of Indiana, Indianapolis in 1890.

== Political career ==
Bohn ran unsuccessfully as a Democrat for the Michigan House of Representatives from the Delta District in the Upper Peninsula of Michigan in 1896. He worked as a banker and was village president of Newberry, Michigan, 1904–1919, and a member of the Newberry School Board, 1908–1914. He was an unsuccessful candidate in the Republican primary election for Lieutenant Governor of Michigan in 1916. He was a member of the Michigan Senate from the 30th District, 1923–1926.

Bohn defeated incumbent Republican Frank D. Scott in the primary election in 1926. He then won the general election to the United States House of Representatives from Michigan's 11th congressional district for the 70th Congress and the two succeeding Congresses, serving from March 4, 1927, to March 3, 1933. He was an unsuccessful candidate for re-election to the 73rd Congress in 1932, losing in the general election to Democrat Prentiss M. Brown.

After leaving Congress, Bohn was a member of the Michigan State Hospital Commission from 1935 through 1937. Bohn died at the age of seventy-seven in Newberry, Michigan and is interred there at Forest Home Cemetery.

U.S. House of Representatives
Preceded by Frank D. Scott	United States Representative for the 11th congressional district of Michigan; 1927–1933	Succeeded by Prentiss M. Brown
