= List of Eastern Michigan Eagles football seasons =

The following is a list of Eastern Michigan Eagles football seasons for the football team that has represented Eastern Michigan University in NCAA competition.

== Seasons ==
| Year | Coach | Overall | Conference | Standing | Bowl/playoffs | Coaches^{#} | AP^{°} |
|---|---|---|---|---|---|---|---|
James M. Swift (Independent) (1891)
| 1891 | James M. Swift | 0–2 | | | | | |
| James M. Swift: | | 0–2 | | | | | |
Dean W. Kelley (Independent) (1892)
| 1892 | Dean W. Kelley | 2–1 | | | | | |
| Dean W. Kelley: | | 2–1 | | | | | |
Ernest P. Goodrich (Independent) (1893)
| 1893 | Ernest P. Goodrich | 4–2 | | | | | |
| Ernest P. Goodrich: | | 4–2 | | | | | |
Verne S. Bennett (Michigan Intercollegiate Athletic Association) (1894)
| 1894 | Verne S. Bennett | 5–2 | 0–1 | 4th | | | |
| Verne S. Bennett: | | 4–2 | 0–1 | | | | |
Marcus Cutler (Independent) (1895)
| 1895 | Marcus Cutler | 3–3 | | | | | |
| Marcus Cutler: | | 3–3 | | | | | |
Fred W. Green (Michigan Intercollegiate Athletic Association) (1896)
| 1896 | Fred W. Green | 4–1 | 2–0 | 1st | | | |
| Fred W. Green: | | 4–1 | 2–0 | | | | |
Andrew Bird Glaspie (Michigan Intercollegiate Athletic Association) (1897)
| 1897 | Andrew Bird Glaspie | 3–2 | 1–1 | | | | |
| Andrew Bird Glaspie: | | 3–2 | 1–1 | | | | |
Enoch Thorne (Michigan Intercollegiate Athletic Association) (1898)
| 1898 | Enoch Thorne | 1–5–2 | 0–3 | | | | |
| Enoch Thorne: | | 1–5–2 | 0–3 | | | | |
Dwight Watson (Michigan Intercollegiate Athletic Association) (1899)
| 1899 | Dwight Watson | 1–1–1 | 0–1 | | | | |
| Dwight Watson: | | 1–1–1 | 0–1 | | | | |
Clayton Teetzel (Michigan Intercollegiate Athletic Association) (1900–1902)
| 1900 | Clayton Teetzel | 2–4 | 0–1 | | | | |
| 1901 | Clayton Teetzel | 3–5 | 0–3 | | | | |
| 1902 | Clayton Teetzel | 1–5–1 | 0–2 | | | | |
| Clayton Teetzel: | | 6–14–1 | 0–6 | | | | |
Hunter Forest (Michigan Intercollegiate Athletic Association) (1903)
| 1903 | Hunter Forest | 4–4 | 0–2 | | | | |
| Hunter Forest: | | 4–4 | 0–2 | | | | |
Daniel H. Lawrence (Michigan Intercollegiate Athletic Association) (1904–1905)
| 1904 | Daniel H. Lawrence | 6–2 | 1–1 | | | | |
| 1905 | Daniel H. Lawrence | 4–4 | 0–2 | | | | |
| Daniel H. Lawrence: | | 10–6 | 1–3 | | | | |
Henry Schulte (Michigan Intercollegiate Athletic Association) (1906–1908)
| 1906 | Henry Schulte | 5–0–1 | 1–0 | | | | |
| 1907 | Henry Schulte | 3–2 | 0–1 | | | | |
| 1908 | Henry Schulte | 1–4 | 0–3 | | | | |
| Henry Schulte: | | 9–6–1 | 1–4 | | | | |
Clare Hunter (Michigan Intercollegiate Athletic Association) (1909)
| 1909 | Clare Hunter | 2–4 | 1–2 | | | | |
| Clare Hunter: | | 2–4 | 1–2 | | | | |
Curry Hicks (Michigan Intercollegiate Athletic Association) (1910)
| 1910 | Curry Hicks | 0–5–1 | 0–2–1 | | | | |
| Curry Hicks: | | 0–5–1 | 0–2–1 | | | | |
Dwight Wilson (Michigan Intercollegiate Athletic Association) (1911)
| 1911 | Dwight Wilson | 3–4 | 0–2 | | | | |
| Dwight Wilson: | | 3–4 | 0–2 | | | | |
Leroy Brown (Michigan Intercollegiate Athletic Association) (1912–1913)
| 1912 | Leroy Brown | 4–2–1 | 0–1 | | | | |
| 1913 | Leroy Brown | 2–3–1 | 1–1 | | | | |
| Leroy Brown: | | 6–5–2 | 1–2 | | | | |
Thomas Ransom (Michigan Intercollegiate Athletic Association) (1914)
| 1914 | Thomas Ransom | 3–2–1 | 1–0–1 | | | | |
| Thomas Ransom: | | 3–2–1 | 1–0–1 | | | | |
Elmer Mitchell (Michigan Intercollegiate Athletic Association) (1915–1916)
| 1915 | Elmer Mitchell | 4–2–1 | 1–1 | | | | |
| 1916 | Elmer Mitchell | 1–2–1 | 1–2 | | | | |
| Elmer Mitchell: | | 5–4–2 | 2–3 | | | | |
Elton Rynearson (Michigan Intercollegiate Athletic Association) (1917)
| 1917 | Elton Rynearson | 3–4 | | | | | |
Lynn Bell (Michigan Intercollegiate Athletic Association) (1918)
| 1918 | Lynn Bell | 1–2 | 1–0 | | | | |
| Lynn Bell: | | 1–2 | 1–0 | | | | |
Elton Rynearson (Michigan Intercollegiate Athletic Association) (1919–1920)
| 1919 | Elton Rynearson | 4–2–1 | | | | | |
| 1920 | Elton Rynearson | 6–2 | 1–2 | T–4th | | | |
Joseph McCulloch (Michigan Intercollegiate Athletic Association) (1921–1922)
| 1921 | Joseph McCulloch | 3–3 | 1–2 | 4th | | | |
| 1922 | Joseph McCulloch | 3–2–2 | 1–2 | 4th | | | |
| Joseph McCulloch: | | 6–5–2 | 4–2 | | | | |
James M. Brown (Michigan Intercollegiate Athletic Association) (1923–1924)
| 1923 | James M. Brown | 2–5–1 | 1–3–1 | T–4th | | | |
| 1924 | James M. Brown | 2–5–1 | 2–3 | 4th | | | |
| James M. Brown: | | 4–10–2 | 4–6–1 | | | | |
Elton Rynearson (Michigan Intercollegiate Athletic Association) (1925)
| 1925 | Elton Rynearson | 8–0 | 5–0 | 1st | | | |
Elton Rynearson (Independent) (1926)
| 1926 | Elton Rynearson | 6–1 | | | | | |
Elton Rynearson (Michigan Collegiate Conference) (1927–1930)
| 1927 | Elton Rynearson | 8–0 | 3–0 | 1st | | | |
| 1928 | Elton Rynearson | 7–1 | 3–0 | 1st | | | |
| 1929 | Elton Rynearson | 5–1–2 | 2–0–1 | T–1st | | | |
| 1930 | Elton Rynearson | 6–1 | 3–0 | 1st | | | |
Elton Rynearson (Independent) (1931–1948)
| 1931 | Elton Rynearson | 3–1–2 | | | | | |
| 1932 | Elton Rynearson | 5–2 | | | | | |
| 1933 | Elton Rynearson | 6–2 | | | | | |
| 1934 | Elton Rynearson | 5–2 | | | | | |
| 1935 | Elton Rynearson | 4–2–2 | | | | | |
| 1936 | Elton Rynearson | 6–2 | | | | | |
| 1937 | Elton Rynearson | 5–2–1 | | | | | |
| 1938 | Elton Rynearson | 6–1–1 | | | | | |
| 1939 | Elton Rynearson | 3–3–1 | | | | | |
| 1940 | Elton Rynearson | 1–5–1 | | | | | |
| 1941 | Elton Rynearson | 0–5–2 | | | | | |
| 1942 | Elton Rynearson | 3–3–1 | | | | | |
| 1943 | Elton Rynearson | 2–0 | | | | | |
| 1944 | No team – WWII | | | | | | |
| 1945 | Elton Rynearson | 5–0–1 | | | | | |
| 1946 | Elton Rynearson | 3–4–1 | | | | | |
| 1947 | Elton Rynearson | 1–6 | | | | | |
| 1948 | Elton Rynearson | 3–5 | | | | | |
| Elton Rynearson: | | 114–58–15 | 17–2–1 | | | | |
Harry Ockerman (Independent) (1949)
| 1949 | Harry Ockerman | 0–8 | | | | | |
Harry Ockerman (Interstate Intercollegiate Athletic Conference) (1950–1951)
| 1950 | Harry Ockerman | 3–6 | 0–4 | 7th | | | |
| 1951 | Harry Ockerman | 4–5 | 2–4 | 5th | | | |
| Harry Ockerman: | | 7–19 | 2–8 | | | | |
Fred Trosko (Interstate Intercollegiate Athletic Conference) (1952–1961)
| 1952 | Fred Trosko | 5–3–1 | 3–2–1 | 3rd | | | |
| 1953 | Fred Trosko | 7–1–1 | 4–1–1 | 3rd | | | |
| 1954 | Fred Trosko | 8–1 | 5–1 | T–1st | | | |
| 1955 | Fred Trosko | 7–2 | 5–1 | T–1st | | | |
| 1956 | Fred Trosko | 4–4 | 3–3 | T–3rd | | | |
| 1957 | Fred Trosko | 6–3 | 6–0 | 1st | | | |
| 1958 | Fred Trosko | 4–5 | 3–3 | 4th | | | |
| 1959 | Fred Trosko | 1–7 | 1–5 | 7th | | | |
| 1960 | Fred Trosko | 0–8–1 | 0–5–1 | 7th | | | |
| 1961 | Fred Trosko | 0–8–1 | 0–6 | 7th | | | |
Fred Trosko (NCAA College Division independent) (1962–1963)
| 1962 | Fred Trosko | 2–5 | | | | | |
| 1963 | Fred Trosko | 2–6 | | | | | |
Fred Trosko (Presidents' Athletic Conference) (1964)
| 1964 | Fred Trosko | 4–3 | 3–2 | 3rd | | | |
| Fred Trosko: | | 50–56–4 | 33–29–3 | | | | |
Jerry Raymond (Presidents' Athletic Conference) (1965)
| 1965 | Jerry Raymond | 3–4–1 | 3–1–1 | 3rd | | | |
Jerry Raymond (NCAA College Division independent) (1966)
| 1966 | Jerry Raymond | 5–3–1 | | | | | |
| Jerry Raymond: | | 8–7–2 | 3–1–1 | | | | |
Dan Boisture (NCAA College Division / NCAA Division II independent) (1967–1973)
| 1967 | Dan Boisture | 6–3 | | | | | |
| 1968 | Dan Boisture | 8–2 | | | | | 7 (Note: Rankings from AP small college poll) |
| 1969 | Dan Boisture | 5–4 | | | | | |
| 1970 | Dan Boisture | 7–2–1 | | | | | 19 (Note: Rankings from AP small college poll) |
| 1971 | Dan Boisture | 7–1–2 | | | L Pioneer | 3 (Note: Rankings from UPI coaches small college poll) | 3 (Note: Rankings from AP small college poll) |
| 1972 | Dan Boisture | 6–4 | | | | | |
| 1973 | Dan Boisture | 6–4 | | | | | |
| Dan Boisture: | | 45–20–3 | | | | | |
George Mans (NCAA Division II independent) (1974–1975)
| 1974 | George Mans | 4–6–1 | | | | | |
| 1975 | George Mans | 4–6 | | | | | |
| George Mans: | | 8–12–1 | | | | | |
Ed Chlebek (Mid-American Conference) (1976–1977)
| 1976 | Ed Chlebek | 2–9 | 1–5 | 9th | | | |
| 1977 | Ed Chlebek | 8–3 | 4–3 | T–4th | | | |
| Ed Chlebek: | | 10–12 | 5–8 | | | | |
Mike Stock (Mid-American Conference) (1978–1982)
| 1978 | Mike Stock | 3–7 | 1–5 | 10th | | | |
| 1979 | Mike Stock | 2–8–1 | 1–6–1 | 9th | | | |
| 1980 | Mike Stock | 1–9 | 1–7 | 10th | | | |
| 1981 | Mike Stock | 0–11 | 0–9 | 10th | | | |
| 1982 | Mike Stock / Bob LaPointe | 1–9–1 | 1–7–1 | 9th | | | |
| Mike Stock: | | 6–38–1 | 3–28–1 | | | | |
| Bob LaPointe: | | 1–6–1 | 1–6–1 | | | | |
Jim Harkema (Mid-American Conference) (1983–1992)
| 1983 | Jim Harkema | 1–10 | 0–9 | 10th | | | |
| 1984 | Jim Harkema | 2–7–2 | 2–5–2 | 10th | | | |
| 1985 | Jim Harkema | 4–7 | 3–6 | T–6th | | | |
| 1986 | Jim Harkema | 6–5 | 4–4 | T–5th | | | |
| 1987 | Jim Harkema | 10–2 | 7–1 | 1st | W California | | |
| 1988 | Jim Harkema | 6–3–1 | 5–2–1 | 2nd | | | |
| 1989 | Jim Harkema | 7–3–1 | 6–2 | T–2nd | | | |
| 1990 | Jim Harkema | 2–9 | 2–6 | T–7th | | | |
| 1991 | Jim Harkema | 3–7–1 | 3–4–1 | 7th | | | |
| 1992 | Jim Harkema / Jan Quarless | 1–10 | 1–7 | T–9th | | | |
| Jim Harkema: | | 41–57–5 | 32–41–4 | | | | |
| Jan Quarless: | | 1–6 | 1–5 | | | | |
Ron Cooper (Mid-American Conference) (1993–1994)
| 1993 | Ron Cooper | 4–7 | 3–5 | T–7th | | | |
| 1994 | Ron Cooper | 5–6 | 5–4 | 7th | | | |
| Ron Cooper: | | 9–13 | 8–9 | | | | |
Rick Rasnick (Mid-American Conference) (1995–1999)
| 1995 | Rick Rasnick | 6–5 | 5–3 | 5th | | | |
| 1996 | Rick Rasnick | 3–8 | 3–5 | T–6th | | | |
| 1997 | Rick Rasnick | 4–7 | 4–5 | 4th (West) | | | |
| 1998 | Rick Rasnick | 3–8 | 3–6 | 4th (West) | | | |
| 1999 | Rick Rasnick / Tony Lombardi | 4–7 | 4–4 | 4th (West) | | | |
| Rick Rasnick: | | 20–34 | 19–22 | | | | |
| Tony Lombardi: | | 0–1 | 0–1 | | | | |
Jeff Woodruff (Mid-American Conference) (2000–2003)
| 2000 | Jeff Woodruff | 3–8 | 2–5 | 5th (West) | | | |
| 2001 | Jeff Woodruff | 2–9 | 1–6 | 6th (West) | | | |
| 2002 | Jeff Woodruff | 3–9 | 1–7 | 7th (West) | | | |
| 2003 | Jeff Woodruff / Al Lavan | 3–9 | 2–6 | 6th (West) | | | |
| Jeff Woodruff: | | 9–34 | 4–23 | | | | |
| Al Lavan: | | 2–1 | 2–1 | | | | |
Jeff Genyk (Mid-American Conference) (2004–2008)
| 2004 | Jeff Genyk | 4–7 | 4–4 | 4th (West) | | | |
| 2005 | Jeff Genyk | 4–7 | 3–5 | 6th (West) | | | |
| 2006 | Jeff Genyk | 1–11 | 1–7 | 6th (West) | | | |
| 2007 | Jeff Genyk | 4–8 | 3–4 | T–3rd (West) | | | |
| 2008 | Jeff Genyk | 3–9 | 2–6 | 6th (West) | | | |
| Jeff Genyk: | | 16–42 | 13–26 | | | | |
Ron English (Mid-American Conference) (2009–2013)
| 2009 | Ron English | 0–12 | 0–8 | 6th (West) | | | |
| 2010 | Ron English | 2–10 | 2–6 | 6th (West) | | | |
| 2011 | Ron English | 6–6 | 4–4 | T–4th (West) | | | |
| 2012 | Ron English | 2–10 | 1–7 | 6th (West) | | | |
| 2013 | Ron English / Stan Parrish | 2–10 | 1–7 | T–5th (West) | | | |
| Ron English: | | 11–46 | 7–30 | | | | |
| Stan Parrish: | | 1–2 | 1–1 | | | | |
Chris Creighton (Mid-American Conference) (2014–present)
| 2014 | Chris Creighton | 2–10 | 1–7 | 6th (West) | | | |
| 2015 | Chris Creighton | 1–11 | 0–8 | 6th (West) | | | |
| 2016 | Chris Creighton | 7–6 | 4–4 | 4th (West) | L Bahamas | | |
| 2017 | Chris Creighton | 5–7 | 3–5 | 5th (West) | | | |
| 2018 | Chris Creighton | 7–6 | 5–4 | T–2nd (West) | L Camellia | | |
| 2019 | Chris Creighton | 6–7 | 3–5 | T–5th (West) | L Quick Lane | | |
| 2020 | Chris Creighton | 2–4 | 2–4 | 5th (West) | | | |
| 2021 | Chris Creighton | 7–6 | 4–4 | T–4th (West) | | | |
| 2022 | Chris Creighton | 9–4 | 5–3 | T–1st (West) | W Famous Idaho Potato | | |
| 2023 | Chris Creighton | 6–7 | 4–4 | 3rd (West) | L 68 Ventures | | |
| 2024 | Chris Creighton | 5–7 | 2–6 | T–9th | | | |
| 2025 | Chris Creighton | 4–8 | 3–5 | T–9th | | | |
| Chris Creighton: | | 61–83 | 36–58 | | | | |
| Total: | | 499–638–47 (.441) | | | | | |
National championship Conference title Conference division title or championship game berth
^{#}Rankings from final Coaches Poll.; ^{°}Rankings from final AP Poll.
