= List of Eastern Michigan Eagles head football coaches =

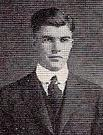
Elton Rynearson is Eastern Michigan's winningest head football coach.

The Eastern Michigan Eagles football program is a college football team that represents Eastern Michigan University in the Mid-American Conference, a part of the NCAA Division I. The team has had 40 head coaches, including four interim head coaches who each served less than one full season (Bob LaPointe, Jan Quarless, Tony Lombardi, and Al Lavan), since its first recorded football game in 1891. The current coach is Chris Creighton, who took the position for the 2014 season.

Many of EMU's head coaches have had brief tenures with the program; 18 head coaches served for one season or less. Among the more notable head coaches at EMU have been Clayton Teetzel (1900–1902), Henry Schulte (1906–1908), Elton Rynearson (1917, 1919–1920, 1925–1948), Fred Trosko (1952–1964), Dan Boisture (1967–1973), Mike Stock (1978–1982), and Jim Harkema (1983–1992). Rynearson was the longest-serving and winningest coach, with a record of 114-58-15 over 26 seasons, while Vern Bennett (1894) posted the highest winning percentage, 71.4%. Tony Lombardi was the shortest-tenured coach, both in time and number of games, leading the team only for five days, and only for the final game of the 1999 season.

The most recent head coach to leave Eastern Michigan with a winning record was Dan Boisture, who left after the 1973 season; only Boisture and Elton Rynearson coached more than two seasons and retired with winning records.

== Key ==
Key to symbols in coaches list
General		Overall		Conference		Postseason (Note: Although the first Rose Bowl Game was played in 1902, it has been continuously played since the 1916 game, and is recognized as the oldest bowl game by the NCAA. "—" indicates any season prior to 1916 when postseason games were not played.)	
No.	Order of coaches (Note: A running total of the number of head coaches, with coaches who served separate tenures being counted only once. Interim head coaches are represented with "Int" and are not counted in the running total. "—" indicates the team played but either without a coach or no coach is on record. "X" indicates an interim year without play.)	GC	Games coached	CW	Conference wins	PW	Postseason wins
DC	Division championships	OW	Overall wins	CL	Conference losses	PL	Postseason losses
CC	Conference championships	OL	Overall losses	CT	Conference ties	PT	Postseason ties
NC	National championships	OT	Overall ties (Note: Overtime rules in college football were introduced in 1996, making ties impossible in the period since.)	C%	Conference winning percentage		
†	Elected to the College Football Hall of Fame	O%	Overall winning percentage (Note: When computing the win–loss percentage, a tie counts as half a win and half a loss.)				

== Coaches ==
Statistics correct as of the end of the 2024 college football season.

No.	Name	Term	GC	OW	OL	OT	O%	CW	CL	CT	C%	PW	PL	CCs	Awards
1	James M. Swift	1891	2	0	2	0	.000	—	—	—	—	—	—	—	
2	Deane W. Kelley	1892	3	2	1	0	.667	—	—	—	—	—	—	—	
3	Ernest P. Goodrich	1893	6	4	2	0	.667	—	—	—	—	—	—	—	
4	Verne S. Bennett	1894	7	5	2	0	.714	0	1	0	.000	—	—	0	
5	Marcus Cutler	1895	6	3	3	0	.500	0	0	0	–	—	—	0	
6	Fred W. Green	1896	5	4	1	0	.800	2	0	0	1.000	—	—	1	
7	A. Bird Glaspie	1897	5	2	3	0	.400	0	1	0	.000	—	—	0	
8	Enoch C. Thorne	1898	8	1	5	2	.250	0	3	0	.000	—	—	0	
9	Dwight Watson	1899	3	1	1	1	.500	0	1	0	.000	—	—	0	
10	Clayton T. Teetzel	1900–1902	21	6	14	1	.310	0	6	0	.000	0	0	0	
11	Hunter Forest	1903	8	4	4	0	.500	0	2	0	.000	0	0	0	
12	Daniel H. Lawrence	1904–1905	16	10	6	0	.625	1	3	0	.250	0	0	0	
13	Henry F. Schulte	1906–1908	16	9	6	1	.594	1	4	0	.200	0	0	0	
14	Clare Hunter	1909	6	2	4	0	.333	1	2	0	.333	0	0	0	
15	Curry Hicks	1910	6	0	5	1	.083	0	2	1	.167	0	0	0	
16	Dwight Wilson	1911	7	3	4	0	.429	0	2	0	.000	0	0	0	
17	Leroy Brown	1912–1913	13	6	5	2	.538	1	2	0	.333	0	0	0	
18	Thomas Ransom	1914	6	3	2	1	.583	1	0	1	.750	0	0	0	
19	Elmer Mitchell	1915–1916	11	5	4	2	.545	2	3	0	.400	0	0	0	
20	Elton Rynearson	1917, 1919–1920, 1925–1948	187	114	58	15	.650					0	0	5	
21	Lynn Bell	1918	3	1	2	0	.333	1	0	0	1.000	0	0	0	
22	Joseph McCulloch	1921–1922	13	6	5	2	.538	2	4	0	.333	0	0	0	
23	James M. Brown	1923–1924	16	4	10	2	.313	3	6	1	.350	0	0	0	
24	Harry Ockerman	1949–1951	26	7	19	0	.269	—	—	—	—	0	0	0	
25	Fred Trosko	1952–1964	110	50	56	4	.473					0	0	3	
26	Jerry Raymond	1965–1966	17	8	7	2	.529	3	1	1	.700	0	0	0	
27	Dan Boisture	1967–1973	68	45	20	3	.684	2	4	0	.333	0	1	0	
28	George Mans	1974–1975	21	8	12	1	.405	3	6	0	.333	0	0	0	
29	Ed Chlebek	1976–1977	22	10	12	0	.455	5	8	0	.385	0	0	0	
30	Mike Stock	1978–1982	45	6	38	1	.144	3	29	0	.094	0	0	0	
Int.	Bob LaPointe	1982	8	1	6	1	.188	1	6	1	.188	0	0	0	
31	Jim Harkema	1983–1992	103	41	57	5	.422	32	41	4	.442	1	0	1	
Int.	Jan Quarless	1992	7	1	6	0	.143	1	5	0	.167	0	0	0	
32	Ron Cooper	1993–1994	22	9	13	0	.409	8	9	0	.471	0	0	0	
33	Rick Rasnick	1995–1999	54	20	34	0	.370	18	21	0	.462	0	0	0	
Int.	Tony Lombardi	1999	1	0	1	—	.000	0	1	—	.000	0	0	0	
34	Jeff Woodruff	2000–2003	46	9	34	—	.209	6	24	—	.200	0	0	0	
Int.	Al Lavan	2003	3	2	1	—	.667	2	1	—	.667	0	0	0	
35	Jeff Genyk	2004–2008	58	16	42	—	.276	13	26	—	.333	0	0	0	
36	Ron English	2009–2013	57	11	46	—	.193	7	30	—	.189	0	0	0	
Int.	Stan Parrish	2013	3	1	2	—	.333	1	2	—	.333	0	0	0	
37	Chris Creighton	2014–present	144	61	83	—	.424	36	58	—	.383	1	5	0	

== Profiles ==
=== Pre-1915 ===
James M. Swift was raised in Massachusetts, where American football went through much of its early development, and he is credited with introducing "scientific football" to Michigan State Normal School. Modern records credit Swift as the school's first football coach, holding that position for the 1891 season.

Following Swift, the football team was coached by a series of men who held the position for a single year each, none of whom were professional coaches in today's sense. About Deane W. Kelley (1892), Verne S. Bennett (1894), Enoch Thorne (1898), Dwight Watson (1899), Hunter Forest (1903), Daniel Lawrence (1904–1905), Clare Hunter (1909), Curry Hicks (1910), Dwight Wilson (1911), Leroy Brown (1912–1913; basketball also), and Thomas Ransom (1914; basketball also) little is known beyond the years they held the position, the team's schedule, and occasional tidbits from The Aurora, the school yearbook. Other early coaches went on to great success in other fields. Ernest P. Goodrich (1893) was a pioneer in urban planning and engineering, the first president of the Institute of Transportation Engineers, and the president of the American Institute of Consulting Engineers. A. Bird Glaspie held various political posts in Michigan, and served in the Michigan House of Representatives from 1917 until 1922 and the Michigan Senate from 1923 through 1924.

Most notable of these early coaches was Fred W. Green, who, in 1896, coached the team to the championship of the Michigan Intercollegiate Athletic Association. Green served 10 years as mayor of Ionia, Michigan, from 1913 until 1922. In 1926, Green was elected Governor of Michigan, and he was re-elected to a second two-year term in 1928.

=== Clayton Teetzel (1900–1902) ===
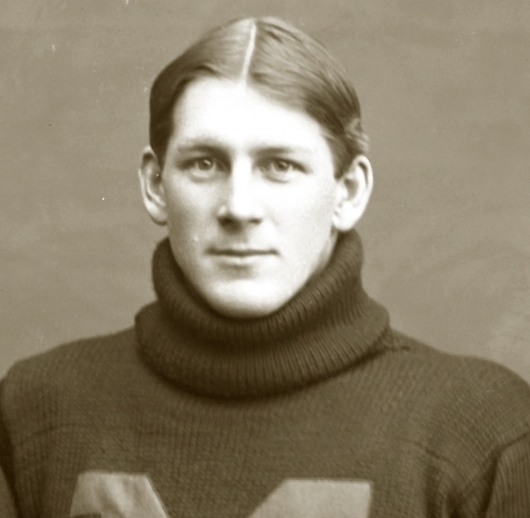
Clayton Teetzel in 1897.

Clayton Teetzel was the first career coach at Michigan State Normal. Teetzel played end on the 1897 and 1898 Michigan Wolverines football teams before switching to halfback in 1899. Teetzel graduated from the University of Michigan Law School with an LL.B. degree in 1900, following which he became the head coach at Michigan State Normal. After three seasons at MSNC, during which he compiled a 6–14–1 record, Teetzel left the school to coach football at Benton Harbor High School in 1903, 1904, and 1905. Teetzel went on to Brigham Young University (1905–1908) and Utah State Agricultural College (1908–1916), where he headed the athletic departments and coached a variety or sports, including basketball and track.

=== Henry Schulte (1906–1908) ===
Henry Schulte was the second career coach to work at Michigan State Normal. Schulte played guard and center at Michigan for Fielding H. Yost's famous "Point-a-Minute" teams of 1903, 1904, and 1905. In 1906, in response to charges of professionalism at major college football programs, the faculty at Michigan ruled Schulte and two other football players academically ineligible. As a result, Schulte missed the 1906 season.

While ineligible at Michigan, Schulte began a long career in coaching. From 1906 to 1908, Schulte served as coach of the football, baseball and track teams at Eastern Michigan University. In three years as Eastern Michigan's football coach, Schulte compiled a 9–6–1 record.

From 1909 to 1913, Schulte coached at Cape Girardeau College in Missouri, and he was also an assistant coach on the 1912 Michigan Wolverines football team. From 1914 to 1919, Schulte coached football and track and field at Missouri. From 1919 to 1920, he was the head football coach at Nebraska, where he compiled an 8–6–3 record. He also served as the school's track coach from 1919 to 1938, and was an assistant coach for the football team from 1922 to 1927. Schulte also served as a coach on the U.S. track team at the 1928 Summer Olympics. In later years, Schulte served as an instructor at coaching schools.

=== Elmer Mitchell (1915–1916) ===
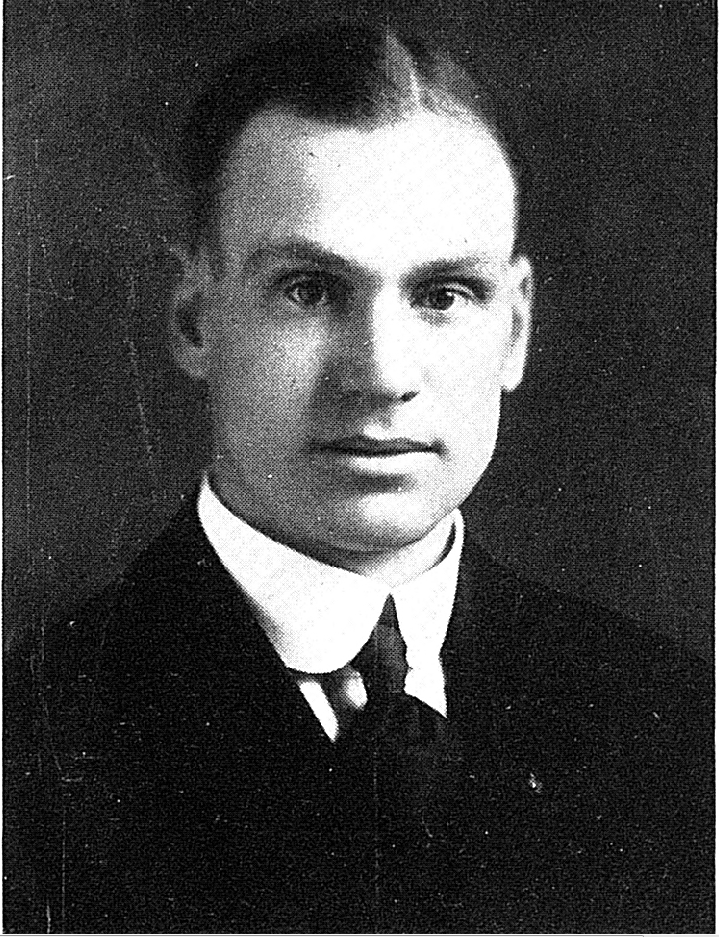
Elmer Mitchell in 1919.

Elmer Mitchell attended the University of Michigan, where he played on the varsity baseball team for three years, and he was the team captain in 1912, his senior year. In the fall of 1912, he was hired as a teacher and coach at Union High School, where "[h]e developed state title contenders in baseball, football, and basketball". In the 1914–1915 season, his last at the high school, the basketball team posted a 14–1 record.

In 1915, Mitchell was hired as an assistant professor of physical education at Michigan State Normal College. While at MSNC, Mitchell taught physical education courses geared toward the school's future teachers, covering such topics as playground direction and athletic coaching, he co-wrote a book about basketball, and he coached several sports. Mitchell was the head football coach for MSNC for the 1915 and 1916 seasons. He was also the head coach for the men's basketball team for the 1915-16 and 1916–17 seasons, with a record of 25 wins and 5 losses, ranking him #1 at the school in winning percentage (.833). Elton Rynearson was the team captain for the 1916–1917 season, and succeeded Mitchell as the head coach. Although the team finished undefeated in Michigan Intercollegiate Athletic Association play in the 1916–1917 season, Kalamazoo College was also undefeated, and is recorded by the MIAA as the champion for that year.

In 1917, Mitchell left MSNC for the University of Michigan, where he coached the first two seasons of varsity basketball, and instituted intramural athletics. For his work at MSNC and Michigan, and for his several books on the subject, Mitchell is considered the father of intramural sports.

=== Elton Rynearson (1917, 1919–1920, 1925–1948) ===
Following the smallpox-shortened 1916 season, during which he was an assistant coach/captain, Rynearson was hired to replace Elmer Mitchell as head coach. Although Rynearson's offense was more effective, outscoring opponents 111 to 82, more than half of the scoring came in a single game, a 63–0 rout of Central Michigan, and the team ended the season with a 3–4 record. After the shortened 3-game 1918 season was coached by Lynn Bell, Rynearson returned to coach the 1919 squad to their first winning season in four years. After another winning season in 1920, other coaches assumed the duties for four years, during which the team managed a 9–15–4 record.

Rynearson's return in 1925 sparked the most successful period in school history. From 1925 through 1930, the team achieved a 40–4–2 record, including perfect seasons in 1925 and 1927. From 1925 through 1927 they outscored opponents 405 points to 31 and registered 19 shutouts. They won the Michigan Intercollegiate Athletic Association Championship in 1925, and won the Michigan Collegiate Conference championships in 1927, 1928, 1929, and 1930. Although less dominant, Rynearson's teams continued to have success throughout the 1930s, never having a losing season until the teams of 1940 and 1941 combined for a 2–10–3 record. The 1943 and 1945 teams (there was no team in 1944) were again successful, combining for a 7–0–1 record. However, following the end of World War II, Rynearson's teams again struggled, and he ended his coaching career on a streak of three losing seasons from 1946 through 1948. His 26 seasons as head coach are double those of the next-longest serving coach, and no Eastern Michigan University football coach has reached even half of Rynearson's win total of 114 games. Over the course of his career, he coached at least one year in every varsity sport at Michigan State Normal, including football, basketball, baseball and track, as well as serving as athletic director from 1948 to 1963.

In September 1969, Eastern Michigan dedicated its new football stadium as Rynearson Stadium. The Eastern Michigan football program has played its home games at Rynearson Stadium since the 1969 season. In 1976, Rynearson was posthumously named one of the inaugural members of the Eastern Michigan University Athletic Hall of Fame.

=== Bell, McCulloch, and Brown (1918, 1921–1924) ===
Lynn Bell coached the team for 1918 season, which was a relatively shorter season of only three games (1917 and 1919 seasons each had a schedule of seven games). The season ended with a trip to Hillsdale College and a 20–6 victory.).

The coaching duties from 1921 through 1924 were split between Joseph McCulloch and James M. Brown, each taking two seasons of work. The best season during this stretch was a 3–3 season in 1921.

=== Harry Ockerman (1949–1951) ===
After Rynearson moved from coaching into an administrative role, Harry Ockerman coached the football team for three seasons. Ockerman had a previous affiliation with the school, having coached men's basketball for three seasons from 1932 to 1935 (bookended by Rynearson), and he was also an experienced football coach, having led the Bowling Green Falcons football team for six seasons from 1935 through 1940, including a 6–1–1 record in 1939. Ockerman was unable to find success with the Michigan State Normal football team, however, posting a 7–19 record in three seasons, including an 0–8 record in 1949.

=== Fred Trosko (1952–1964) ===
A native of Flint, Michigan, Fred Trosko was a multi-sport star at the University of Michigan in the late 1930s, earning nine letters in football, baseball and basketball, and earning both bachelor's and master's degree in education from the school. After serving in the U.S. Army Air Corps throughout World War II, from 1946 until 1952 Trosko worked as a high school football coach in Michigan.

In July 1952, Trosko was hired as head football coach at Michigan State Normal College. The team improved markedly during Trosko's early years as head coach. In his first seven seasons, the team attained a record of 41–19–2, including a 7–1–1 record in 1953 and an 8–1–0 record in 1954. His teams won Interstate Intercollegiate Athletic Conference ("IIAC") championships in 1954 and 1957.

The team's success came to an abrupt end in 1959. Trosko's teams had a 29-game winless streak from the third game of the 1959 season through the fifth game of the 1962 season, following the decision of the Eastern Michigan administration not to award athletic scholarships. Fielding only non-scholarship athletes, Trosko's teams were unable to compete, and in August 1965, Trosko resigned as the result of "an apparent break with school administrators over policy."

Trosko had the second longest tenure of any head coach at the school. He also taught at Eastern Michigan and remained on the faculty at Eastern Michigan after retiring as football coach, ultimately retiring in 1981 as a professor emeritus. In 1982, he was inducted into the Eastern Michigan Sports Hall of Fame.

=== Jerry Raymond (1965–1966) ===
For two years after Trosko's resignation, Jerry Raymond coached the football team. In 1965 the team registered a 3–4–1 record, but with three non-conference losses, their record in the Presidents' Athletic Conference was 3–1–1. In 1966, the team competed as an NCAA College Division independent school and posted a 5–3–1 record.

=== Dan Boisture (1967–1973) ===
A Detroit native and World War II hero, Boisture turned down an offer to play basketball at Notre Dame, instead attending the University of Detroit, where he lettered four times in football, and twice in basketball. After several years of success coaching football at private high schools in Detroit, and seven years as an assistant coach at Michigan State University, during which time the team won two national championships, Boisture was hired as head coach at Eastern Michigan in 1967.

Under his leadership, the team produced the longest period of sustained success since Elton Rynearson's days. The team posted winning seasons in all seven years of Boisture's coaching, including a 13-game winning streak that remains a school record. His 1971 squad finished the regular season 7–0–2, only allowing one touchdown in the last five games, before losing to Louisiana Tech in the Pioneer Bowl, the first bowl trip in school history. Boisture was named NCAA District Four "coach of the year" in 1971.

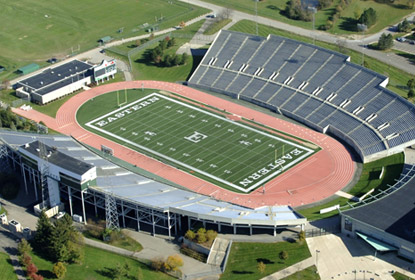
Rynearson Stadium was built during Dan Boisture's tenure as head coach.

Boisture's tenure at Eastern Michigan is also notable for the construction of Rynearson Stadium. In 1969, the new stadium, which was considered off-campus at the time, opened with a capacity of 15,500. Boisture's bowl-bound 1971 team played for one of just two sellout crowds in the stadium's history, a 0–0 tie against Eastern Kentucky on October 16, 1971 which drew 17,360 spectators. In February 1974, Boisture left Eastern Michigan to coach the Detroit Wheels, in the World Football League, who also played home games at Rynearson Stadium.

=== George Mans (1974–1975) ===
A native Detroiter, George Mans was a multi-sport athlete in high school, and played football at Michigan, where he was team captain in 1961. In June 1962, Mans signed with the St. Louis Cardinals of the NFL, but he did not play professionally.

In 1963, Mans was hired as the ends coach for the Eastern Michigan football team, but he left after one year to serve as Michigan Tech's head wrestling coach, assistant director of intramural athletics, and assistant football coach. In 1966, he accepted an assistant coaching position at the University of Michigan where he remained for eight years from 1966 to 1973, serving under both Bump Elliott and Bo Schembechler.

In 1974, Mans was hired as the head football coach at Eastern Michigan, where he remained for the 1974 and 1975 seasons. In his first season as head coach, Mans' team started the season with only one win in the first six games, but the team finished strong, going 3–1–1 in the final five games. In May 1976, Mans announced his resignation as Eastern Michigan's coach in what the Associated Press described as a "surprise move." According to one newspaper report, Mans resigned "when it became apparent that EMU would place a greater emphasis on basketball, hiring former Detroit Pistons Coach Ray Scott."

After leaving Eastern Michigan, Mans went on to a long political career, serving as mayor of Trenton, Michigan, from 1983 to 1989, and as a state representative from 1996 through 2002. He also held the position of City Administrator in Southgate and Flat Rock, Michigan.

=== Ed Chlebek (1976–1977) ===
Chlebek played college football as a quarterback at Western Michigan University from 1959 to 1961, and in 1963, he played for the New York Jets of the American Football League. Chlebek came to Eastern Michigan from the University of Notre Dame, where he was an assistant under Dan Devine and coached future Pro Football Hall of Fame quarterback Joe Montana. At Eastern Michigan, he compiled a 10–12 record from 1976 to 1977. At Boston College, he tallied a 12–21 mark and coached the only winless season in the program's history, a 0–11 campaign in 1978. From 1981 to 1982, he coached Kent State to a 4–18 record. He ended his college career on a 12-game losing streak. From Kent State he went to the Toronto Argonauts of the Canadian Football League as the offensive coordinator in 1983. The Argonauts won the Grey Cup in 1983.

=== Mike Stock and Bob LaPointe (1978–1982) ===
Both Mike Stock and Bob LaPointe had lengthy coaching careers, but their time at Eastern Michigan University is primarily notable for a school-record 27-game losing streak from 1980 through 1982, including a winless season in 1981. Stock was fired after the team lost the first three games of 1982, including a 49-12 pasting at Louisiana Tech and 35–0 shutout at Miami University, bringing the losing streak to 22 games; the team went on to lose five more consecutive games under interim coach Bob LaPointe before the streak was broken with a 9–7 win over Kent State on November 6, 1982. Under LaPointe, the team received widespread attention for their various attempts to end the streak, which included "bringing a coffin to the locker room before the game...as a reminder to 'kill the streak'", and hiring a local hypnotist. Stock's teams were held scoreless seven times, his teams were outscored by a total of 809 points — nearly 18 points per game, and his final record of 6-38-1 gives him a 14.4% win percentage, easily the lowest of any coach to remain at Eastern more than one season.

Stock continued to coach football both at the collegiate level and the professional level, both in the United States Football League and the National Football League, until his retirement following the 2008 NFL season, but this was his only head coaching position. La Pointe went on to a long career as a high school football coach in southeastern Michigan, retiring in 2010.

=== Jim Harkema and Jan Quarless (1983–1992) ===
Following the disastrous end of the Stock/LaPointe years, Eastern Michigan conducted a national coaching search, which resulted in the hiring of Michigan native Jim Harkema in 1983. An alumnus of Kalamazoo College, Harkema had achieved success as the head coach of Grand Valley State, where he compiled a record of 68–29–1 with winning seasons in nine of his ten years, reaching the NAIA semifinals in 1978.

Beginning in 1986, Harkema led Eastern Michigan to four consecutive winning seasons, including Eastern's only Mid-American Conference championship and only 10-win season in 1987, when the team went to the 1987 California Bowl and upset 17½ point favorite San Jose State University for the only bowl game win in school history. Harkema is credited with building the program at Eastern Michigan into a "Top-Shelf" program, and he coached one of just two EMU games at Rynearson Stadium that sold-out: a 24–31 loss to Western Michigan on October 22, 1988 drew 23,003 (listed capacity at the time was 22,227), and a 0–0 tie against Eastern Kentucky on October 16, 1971 drew 17,360 (listed capacity at the time was 15,500).

In 1991, the EMU Board of Regents voted to change the school's mascot from "Hurons" to "Eagles", in a move that remains controversial to this day. (Note: An official chapter of the EMU Alumni Association, the Huron Restoration Chapter, seeks to bring back the name and claims to have the support of Chief Leaford Bearskin of the Wyandot Tribe of Oklahoma and former Grand Chief Max Gros-Louis of the Huron-Wendat Nation of Quebec.) Following the name change, the football team struggled, and after losing the first four games of the 1992 season, Harkema resigned, and assistant coach Jan Quarless took over for the remainder of the season.

=== Ron Cooper (1993–1994) ===
In 1993, Ron Cooper, an alumnus of Jacksonville State University, was hired to take over the program. He stayed for just two seasons, before being hired by Louisville, where he remained through 1997. From 1998 through 2001, Cooper was head coach at Alabama A&M. Cooper has also coached at Wisconsin, Mississippi State, the South Carolina, and Notre Dame.

=== Rick Rasnick and Tony Lombardi (1995–1999) ===
Rick Rasnick attended San Jose State University, and after graduation he stayed with the school as an assistant coach. He applied unsuccessfully for several head coaching positions, and from 1991 through 1995 he was the offensive coordinator for the Utah Utes, during which time the team consistently featured one of the nation's top offenses.

When Eastern Michigan hired him as head coach in 1995, Rasnick brought a more open, pass-oriented offense to Eastern Michigan than his predecessor, Ron Cooper, had used, and Rasnick's recruiting noticeably favored junior-college transfers rather than high school seniors.

On November 16, 1999, three days after a 29–26 loss at Central Michigan, Eastern Michigan Athletic Director Dave Diles held a press conference to announce that he had fired Rasnick as head coach, and that defensive coordinator Tony Lombardi would serve as the interim head coach for the final game of the season, four days later, saying, "I felt it was best to make a change at this time to begin an immediate search for a new head football coach. After undergoing a very thorough and comprehensive assessment of our football program I'm convinced that Rick Rasnick is not the person to take our football team to a Mid-American Conference championship level."

=== Jeff Woodruff and Al Lavan (2000–2003) ===
After firing Rick Rasnick, and allowing the contracts of all his assistant coaches to expire, athletic director Dave Diles hired Jeff Woodruff as the head football coach to begin in 2000. Woodruff's first season, in which the team posted a 3–8 record turned out to be the best of his tenure (.273). Following a 38–10 loss to Central Michigan on November 1, 2003, Diles fired Woodruff, saying, "Jeff Woodruff has helped develop our program with quality young men, but the team is not on the competitive level that we felt should be after four years."

Diles designated running backs coach Al Lavan as the interim coach while the school conducted a national search for the new permanent coach, and under his leadership the team won two of their final three games.

=== Jeff Genyk (2004–2008) ===
Jeff Genyk, a native of nearby Ann Arbor, Michigan, who was raised in Milan, Michigan, played quarterback for Bowling Green State University. He was an assistant coach at Northwestern University from 1994 until 2003, when he was hired to head the Eastern Michigan program. He was fired in November, 2008, but coached the final game of the season against Central Michigan, which set numerous school records for offense.

=== Ron English (2009–2013) ===
Ron English was hired as head coach at Eastern Michigan in December 2008. At the time of his hiring by Eastern Michigan, he was one of six African American head coaches at Football Bowl Subdivision teams; the others (and their teams at the time) were Turner Gill (Buffalo), Kevin Sumlin (Houston), Mike Locksley (New Mexico), Randy Shannon (University of Miami), and Mike Haywood (Miami University). Prior to arriving at Eastern Michigan, English had been the defensive coordinator at Michigan in 2006 and 2007, and at Louisville in 2008. On November 8, 2013, Head Football Coach Ron English was fired.
