= List of Eastern Michigan Eagles men's basketball head coaches =

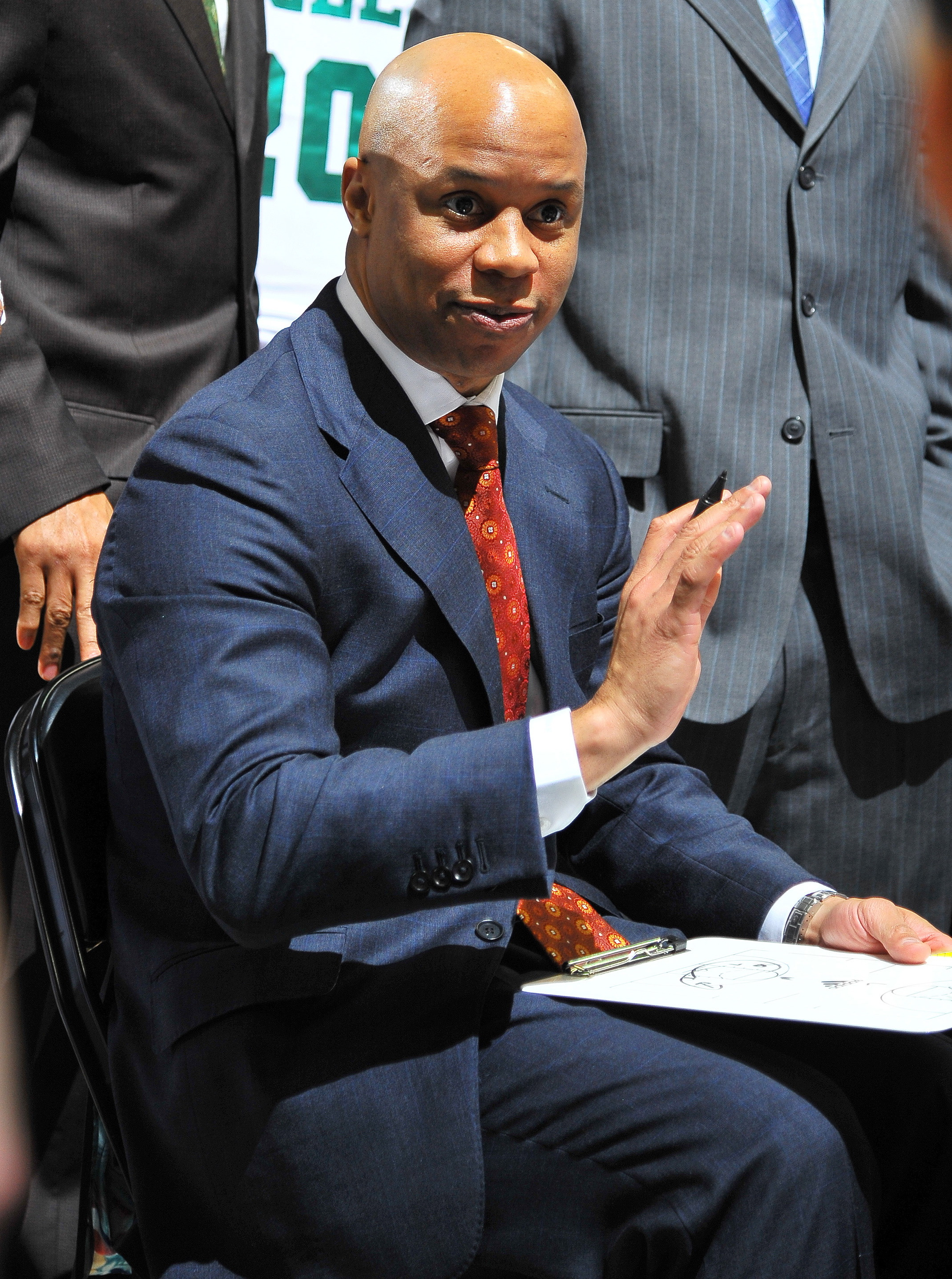
Rob Murphy coached the Eastern Michigan Eagles from 2011 to 2021 and has the third most coaching wins.

The following is a list of Eastern Michigan Eagles men's basketball head coaches. There have been 31 head coaches of the Eagles in their 129-season history.

Eastern Michigan's current head coach is Billy Donlon. He was hired as the Eagles' head coach in March 2026, replacing Stan Heath, who Eastern Michigan mutually parted ways with after the 2025–26 season.

No.	Tenure	Coach	Years	Record	Pct.
1	1897–1898	L. P. Whitcomb	1	1–1	.500
2	1898–1899	E. E. Crook	1	1–1	.500
3	1899–1900	Leslie A. Butler	1	1–1	.500
4	1900–1901	M. Everett Dick	1	0–2	.000
5	1901–1903	Clayton Teetzel	2	2–4	.333
6	1903–1909	Wilbur Bowen	6	22–30	.423
7	1909–1911	Clare Hunter	2	13–9	.591
8	1911–1912	Frederick Beyerman	1	3–8	.273
9	1912–1914	Leroy Brown	2	13–6	.684
10	1914–1915	Thomas Ransom	1	9–4	.692
11	1915–1917	Elmer Mitchell	2	25–5	.833
12	1917–1921; 1925–1932; 1935–1940; 1944–1946	Elton Rynearson	18	160–129	.554
13	1921–1925	Joseph McCulloch	4	45–34	.570
14	1932–1935	Harry Ockerman	3	34–16	.680
15	1940–1941	Frank Worzniak	1	4–13	.235
16	1941–1944; 1946–1947	Ray Stites	4	29–32	.475
17	1947–1953	William Crouch	6	48–67	.417
18	1953–1954	Robert Hollway	1	8–12	.400
19	1954–1960	James Skala	6	43–86	.333
20	1960–1966	Richard Adams	2	32–21	.604
21	1966–1972	Jim Dutcher	6	127–49	.722
22	1972–1976	Allan Freund	4	35–69	.337
23	1976–1979	Ray Scott	3	29–52	.358
24	1979–1986 (Note: Boyce resigned on January 15, 1986. Braun was named interim coach for the remainder of the season.)	Jim Boyce	7	84–96	.467
25	1986–1996 (Note: After serving as interim coach for the end of the 1985–86 season, Braun was named permanent coach in March 1986.)	Ben Braun	11	185–132	.584
26	1996–2000	Milton Barnes	4	62–53	.539
27	2000–2005	Jim Boone	5	48–96	.333
28	2005–2011	Charles Ramsey	2	68–118	.366
29	2011–2021	Rob Murphy	10	128–109	.540
30	2021–2026	Stan Heath	4	57–99	.365
31	2026–present	Billy Donlon	1	0–0	–
Totals		31 coaches	129 seasons	1,316–1,354	.493
Records updated through end of 2025–26 season Source
