= Daniel Lawrence (disambiguation) =

Dan Lawrence (born 1997) is an English cricketer.

Daniel Lawrence may also refer to:

- Daniel H. Lawrence, American football coach
- Daniel Lawrence (politician), Jamaican politician
