= Thomas Ransom =

Thomas Ransom may refer to:

- Thomas E. G. Ransom (1834–1864), surveyor, civil engineer and general in the Union Army during the American Civil War
- Thomas Ransom (coach) (1870–1946), American football and basketball coach in the United States
