= Vernon Bennett =

Vernon Bennett may refer to:

- G. Vernon Bennett (1880–1968), American educator and politician based in California
- Vernon N. Bennett (1936–2008), American politician from Iowa
- Verne S. Bennett (1867–1944), American college football coach
