= Michigan State Normal Normalites football, 1891–1899 =

American college football seasons

The Michigan State Normal Normalites football teams (later known as the Eastern Michigan Eagles) represented the Michigan State Normal School (later renamed Eastern Michigan University) in American football during the program's first decade from 1891 to 1899. Highlights of the decade include the following:

- On October 24, 1891, the school played its first game, losing by a 30–4 score to Ann Arbor High School.
- In 1892, the team achieved the first two victories in program history, defeating the Michigan junior laws (6–4) and Albion College (30–10).
- The 1896 Michigan State Normal Normalites football team compiled a 5–1 record and won the Michigan Intercollegiate Athletic Association championship. The sole loss was to the Michigan Wolverines.

The team's most common opponents of the 1890s were Ann Arbor High School (seven games), the University of Michigan (four games), Albion College (three games), Hillsdale College (three games), the Toledo YMCA (three games), Michigan Agricultural College (now Michigan State University, two games), the Detroit Athletic Club (two games), and Ypsilanti High School (two games).

== 1891 ==
1891 Michigan State Normal Normalites football
- Conference: Independent
- Head coach: James M. Swift (1st season)

1891 Midwestern college football independents records
	Conf.			Overall
Team	W	L	T	W		L		T
Ohio Wesleyan		–		4	–	0	–	0
Kansas		–		7	–	0	–	1
Illinois		–		5	–	1	–	0
Missouri		–		3	–	1	–	0
Lake Forest		–		6	–	2	–	0
Washington University		–		4	–	1	–	1
Minnesota		–		3	–	1	–	1
Wisconsin		–		3	–	1	–	1
Cincinnati		–		4	–	2	–	1
Iowa		–		3	–	2	–	0
Doane		–		2	–	2	–	0
Iowa College		–		1	–	1	–	1
Miami (OH)		–		1	–	1	–	0
Nebraska		–		2	–	2	–	0
Northwestern		–		2	–	2	–	3
Michigan		–		4	–	5	–	0
Ohio State		–		2	–	3	–	0
Case		–		1	–	2	–	0
Buchtel		–		1	–	3	–	0
Washburn		–		1	–	5	–	0
Michigan State Normal		–		0	–	2	–	0

The 1891 Michigan State Normal Normalites football team represented Michigan State Normal School (later renamed Eastern Michigan University) as an independent during the 1891 college football season. In the first season of intercollegiate football at Michigan Normal, the Normalites played only two games, losing to Ann Arbor High School (30–3) and the University of Michigan literary team (30–0). James M. Swift was the team's coach.

The school's 1893 yearbook credits coach Swift with introducing "scientific football" to the school.

The Detroit Free Press reported on the first Michigan Normal football game as follows: "Today witnessed the inaugural game of foot ball in this city [Ypsilanti] between the Ann Arbor High School and the Normals. The Normals began practicing less than a fortnight ago with some good material, including Paton, formerly manager of athletic sports at Oberlin College, and Swift, of Massachusetts, a noted player. Dergan, the norma sprinter, has turned out to be an excellent quarter-back, and the entire team with little practice will surely develop into a winning eleven." Dorgan scored a touchdown in the first half (counting for four points at that time) for the first points scored in the program's history.

The players who participated in Michigan Normal's first season of college football included George H Adams, Walter M. Adrion, Frank E. Angevine, Frank E. Arthur, and James M. Swift.

=== Schedule ===
Date	Opponent	Site	Result
October 24	Ann Arbor High School	Ypsilanti, MI	L 4–30
	Michigan Lit	Ann Arbor, MI	L 0–30

== 1892 ==
1892 Michigan State Normal Normalites football
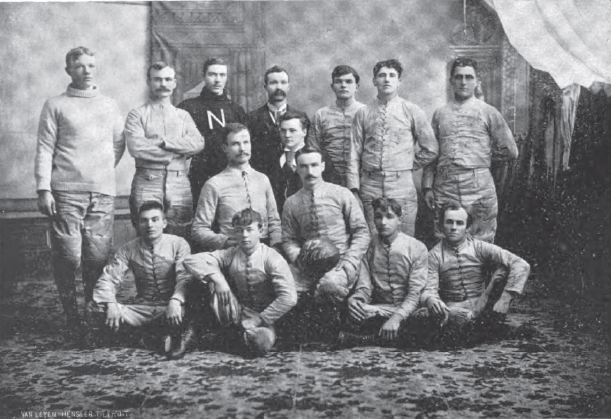
- Conference: Independent
- Head coach: Dean W. Kelley (1st season)
- Captain: George L. Wilson

1892 Midwestern college football independents records
	Conf.			Overall
Team	W	L	T	W		L		T
Oberlin		–		7	–	0	–	0
Case		–		3	–	0	–	0
Iowa Agricultural		–		1	–	0	–	1
Notre Dame		–		1	–	0	–	1
Chicago		–		8	–	4	–	1
Michigan State Normal		–		2	–	1	–	0
Illinois		–		7	–	4	–	1
Ohio State		–		5	–	3	–	0
Washington University		–		3	–	2	–	0
Hillsdale		–		3	–	2	–	1
Doane		–		1	–	1	–	0
Heidelberg		–		1	–	1	–	0
Miami (OH)		–		2	–	2	–	0
Buchtel		–		3	–	4	–	0
Lake Forest		–		2	–	3	–	0
Cincinnati		–		1	–	2	–	0
Marquette		–		1	–	2	–	0
Ohio Wesleyan		–		1	–	3	–	0
Wittenberg		–		0	–	2	–	1
St. Ignatius College		–		0	–	1	–	0
Washburn		–		0	–	2	–	0
Kalamazoo		–		0	–	2	–	0

The 1892 Michigan State Normal Normalites football team represented Michigan State Normal School (later renamed Eastern Michigan University) as an independent during the 1892 college football season. In their first and only season under head coach Dean W. Kelley, the Normalites compiled a record of 2–1 and outscored their opponents by a combined total of 36 to 30. George L. Wilson was the team captain.

=== Schedule ===
Date	Opponent	Site	Result	Source
October 15	at Ann Arbor High School	Ann Arbor, MI	L 0–16	
October 29	at Michigan junior laws	Ann Arbor, MI	W 6–4	
November 2	Albion	Ypsilanti, MI	W 30–10	
November 10	at Michigan Athletic Association	Detroit, MI	Cancelled	

== 1893 ==
1893 Michigan State Normal Normalites football
- Conference: Independent
- Head coach: Ernest P. Goodrich (1st season)
- Captain: J. M. Swift

1893 Midwestern college football independents records
	Conf.			Overall
Team	W	L	T	W		L		T
Case		–		4	–	0	–	0
Miami (OH)		–		3	–	0	–	0
Baker		–		5	–	0	–	1
Oberlin		–		6	–	1	–	0
Hillsdale		–		4	–	1	–	0
Notre Dame		–		4	–	1	–	0
Buchtel		–		5	–	2	–	0
Butler		–		4	–	2	–	0
Michigan State Normal		–		4	–	2	–	0
Chicago		–		6	–	4	–	2
Beloit		–		4	–	3	–	0
Illinois		–		3	–	2	–	3
Lake Forest		–		3	–	2	–	3
Doane		–		2	–	2	–	0
Heidelberg		–		2	–	2	–	0
Kansas State Normal		–		1	–	1	–	0
Wabash		–		3	–	3	–	0
Washburn		–		1	–	1	–	1
Washington University		–		1	–	1	–	0
Ohio State		–		4	–	5	–	0
Wittenberg		–		2	–	3	–	0
Mount Union		–		1	–	2	–	0
Drake		–		0	–	2	–	1
Baldwin–Wallace		–		0	–	1	–	0
College of Emporia		–		0	–	1	–	0
Ohio Wesleyan		–		0	–	1	–	0
Kalamazoo		–		0	–	2	–	0
Iowa Agricultural		–		0	–	3	–	0
Cincinnati		–		0	–	6	–	0

The 1893 Michigan State Normal Normalites football team represented Michigan State Normal School (later renamed Eastern Michigan University) as an independent during the 1893 college football season. In their first and only season under head coach Ernest P. Goodrich, the Normalites compiled a record of 4–2, and outscored their opponents by a combined total of 116 to 100. J. M. Swift was the team captain.

=== Schedule ===
Date	Opponent	Site	Result	Attendance	Source
	Lit. Students '96	Ypsilanti, MI	W 16–8		
October 28	at Hillsdale	Hillsdale, MI	L 0–28		
November 4	at Detroit High School	Fair grounds; Detroit, MI	W 14–10		
November 11	Ann Arbor High School	Ypsilanti, MI	W 42–12		
November 18	Michigan Military Academy	Ypsilanti, MI	L 22–36	200	
	at Fort Wayne	Fort Wayne, IN	W 22–6		

== 1894 ==
1894 Michigan State Normal Normalites football
- Conference: Michigan Intercollegiate Athletic Association
- Record: 5–2 (0–1 MIAA)
- Head coach: Verne S. Bennett (1st season)
- Captain: Charles D. Livingston

1894 Michigan Intercollegiate Athletic Association football standings
	Conf.					Overall
Team	W		L		T	W		L		T
Albion $	3	–	0	–	0	5	–	1	–	1
Hillsdale	1	–	2	–	0	3	–	3	–	0
Olivet	1	–	2	–	0	1	–	3	–	0
Michigan State Normal	0	–	1	–	0	5	–	2	–	0
$ – Conference champion

The 1894 Michigan State Normal Normalites football team represented Michigan State Normal School (later renamed Eastern Michigan University) during the 1894 college football season. In their first and only season under head coach Verne S. Bennett, the Normalites compiled a record of 5–2 and outscored their opponents by a combined total of 176 to 70. Charles D. Livingston was the team captain.

=== Schedule ===
Date	Opponent	Site	Result	Source
September 29	Ann Arbor High School*	Ypsilanti, MI	W 18–0	
October 6	at Olivet	Olivet, MI	L 0–48	
October 13	Michigan reserves*	Ypsilanti, MI	W 18–4	
October 27	Ypsilanti High School*	Ypsilanti, MI	W 36–0	
November 3	Toledo Athletic Association*	Ypsilanti, MI	W 76–0	
November 17	at Michigan Athletic Association*	Detroit, MI	W 18–6	
November 24	at Ann Arbor High School	Ann Arbor, MI	L 10–12	
*Non-conference game

== 1895 ==
1895 Michigan State Normal Normalites football
- Conference: Independent
- Head coach: Marcus Cutler (1st season)
- Captain: Benjamin J. Watters

1895 Midwestern college football independents records
	Conf.			Overall
Team	W	L	T	W		L		T
Miami (OH)		–		3	–	0	–	0
Carthage		–		2	–	0	–	0
Washington University		–		2	–	0	–	0
Michigan		–		8	–	1	–	0
Chicago		–		10	–	3	–	0
Wittenberg		–		5	–	2	–	0
Minnesota		–		7	–	3	–	0
Wisconsin		–		5	–	2	–	1
Wabash		–		6	–	3	–	0
Baldwin–Wallace		–		3	–	1	–	0
Notre Dame		–		3	–	1	–	0
Illinois		–		4	–	2	–	1
Buchtel		–		3	–	2	–	0
College of Emporia		–		3	–	2	–	0
Doane		–		3	–	2	–	0
Chicago P&S		–		3	–	2	–	1
Purdue		–		4	–	3	–	0
Indiana		–		4	–	3	–	1
Northwestern		–		6	–	5	–	0
Butler		–		2	–	2	–	0
Cincinnati		–		3	–	3	–	0
Kalamazoo		–		1	–	1	–	0
Michigan State Normal		–		3	–	3	–	0
North Dakota Agricultural		–		1	–	1	–	0
North Dakota		–		1	–	1	–	0
Ohio State		–		4	–	4	–	2
Iowa Agricultural		–		3	–	4	–	0
Ohio		–		2	–	3	–	0
Rush-Lake Forest		–		4	–	6	–	0
Ohio Wesleyan		–		2	–	4	–	1
Haskell		–		1	–	2	–	0
Iowa State Normal		–		1	–	2	–	0
Lake Forest		–		1	–	2	–	0
Northwestern Law		–		1	–	2	–	0
Drake		–		1	–	4	–	0

The 1895 Michigan State Normal Normalites football team represented Michigan State Normal School (later renamed Eastern Michigan University) as an independent during the 1895 college football season. In their first and only season under head coach Marcus Cutler, the Normalites compiled a record of 3–3, and outscored by their opponents by a combined total of 119 to 54. Benjamin J. Watters was the team captain.

=== Schedule ===
Date	Opponent	Site	Result
October 4	at Atlantis		W 9–8
October 5	at Ann Arbor High School	Ann Arbor, MI	W 32–0
October 12	at Michigan reserves	Ann Arbor, MI	L 0–10
October 26	at St. Mary's		L 10–24
November 2	Michigan Lits	Ypsilanti, MI	W 56–6
November 16	at Detroit Athletic Club	Detroit, Michigan	L 12–16

== 1896 ==
1896 Michigan State Normal Normalites football

MIAA champion
- Conference: Michigan Intercollegiate Athletic Association
- Record: 5–1 (2–0 MIAA)
- Head coach: Fred W. Green (1st season)
- Captain: Charles D. Livingston

The 1896 Michigan State Normal Normalites football team represented Michigan State Normal School (later renamed Eastern Michigan University) during the 1896 college football season. In their first and only season under head coach Fred W. Green, the Normalites compiled a record of 5–1, shut out five of six opponents, and outscored their opponents by a combined total of 116 to 18. Benjamin J. Watters was the team captain.

As of September 27, 1896, as the football season began, the enrollment at Michigan State Normal School was approximately 800 students.

=== Schedule ===
Date	Opponent	Site	Result	Source
September 27	Hillsdale	Ypsilanti, MI	W 18–0	
October 3	at Michigan*	Regents Field; Ann Arbor, MI	L 0–18	
October 17	at Ann Arbor High School*	Ann Arbor, MI	W 30–0	
November 7	Albion	Ypsilanti, MI	W 52–0	
November 14	Detroit Athletic Club*	Ypsilanti, MI	W 10–0	
November 26	Ypsilanti Stars*	Ypsilanti, MI	W 6–0	
*Non-conference game

== 1897 ==
1897 Michigan State Normal Normalites football
- Conference: Michigan Intercollegiate Athletic Association
- Record: 3–2 (1–1 MIAA)
- Head coach: Andrew Bird Glaspie (1st season)
- Captain: George L. Wilson

The 1897 Michigan State Normal Normalites football team represented Michigan State Normal School (later renamed Eastern Michigan University) during the 1897 college football season. In their first and only season under head coach Andrew Bird Glaspie, the Normalites compiled a record of 3–2 and outscored opponents by a total of 54 to 50. George L. Wilson was the team captain.

=== Schedule ===
Date	Time	Opponent	Site	Result	Attendance	Source
September 25		Michigan alumni*	Ypsilanti, MI	W 24–0		
October 2		at Michigan*	Regents Field; Ann Arbor, MI	L 0–24	1,200	
October 30		at Albion	Albion, MI	W 18–6		
November 6		at Toledo YMCA*	Toledo, OH	W 12–4		
November 25	2:45 p.m.	Kalamazoo	Ypsilanti, MI	L 0–16		
*Non-conference game

== 1898 ==
1898 Michigan State Normal Normalites football
- Conference: Michigan Intercollegiate Athletic Association
- Record: 1–5–2 (0–3 MIAA)
- Head coach: Enoch Thorne (1st season)
- Captain: Fred Q. Gorton

1898 Michigan Intercollegiate Athletic Association football standings
	Conf.					Overall
Team	W		L		T	W		L		T
Kalamazoo $	5	–	0	–	0	7	–	0	–	0
Hillsdale	2	–	0	–	0	4	–	1	–	0
Michigan Agricultural	4	–	1	–	0	4	–	3	–	0
Michigan State Normal	0	–	3	–	0	1	–	5	–	2
Olivet	0	–	3	–	0	0	–	5	–	0
Albion	0	–	4	–	0	1	–	6	–	0
$ – Conference champion

The 1898 Michigan State Normal Normalites football team represented Michigan State Normal School (later renamed Eastern Michigan University) during the 1898 college football season. In their first and only season under head coach Enoch Thorne, the Normalites compiled a record of 1–5–2, failed to score in five of eight games played, and were outscored by their opponents by a combined total of 100 to 19. Fred Q. Gorton was the team captain.

Enrollment at Michigan State Normal reached 915 students in October 1898.

=== Schedule ===
Date	Opponent	Site	Result	Source
October 1	at Michigan*	Regents Field; Ann Arbor, MI	L 0–25	
October 8	Michigan Agricultural	Ypsilanti, MI	L 6–11	
October 15	at Toledo YMCA*	Toledo, OH	L 0–16	
October 29	Toledo YMCA*	Ypsilanti, MI	T 0–0	
November 12	Alumni*	Ypsilanti, MI	T 0–0	
November 15	at Ypsilanti High School*	Ypsilanti, MI	W 7–0	
November 19	at Michigan Agricultural	East Lansing, MI	L 6–24	
	at Hillsdale	Hillsdale, MI	L 0–24	
*Non-conference game

== 1899 ==
1899 Michigan State Normal Normalites football
- Conference: Michigan Intercollegiate Athletic Association
- Record: 1–1–1 (0–1 MIAA)
- Head coach: Dwight Watson (1st season)
- Captain: George L. Wood

The 1899 Michigan State Normal Normalites football team represented Michigan State Normal College (later renamed Eastern Michigan University) during the 1899 college football season. In their first and only season under head coach Dwight Watson, the Normalites compiled a record of 1–1–1 and outscored their opponents by a combined total of 29 to 23. George L. Wood was the team captain. They played the University of Michigan freshman team to 5-5 tie, lost to Michigan Agricultural College by an 18-0 score, and defeated the Toledo YMCA team, 24-0.

=== Schedule ===
Date	Opponent	Site	Result	Source
October 30	at Michigan freshmen*	Ann Arbor, MI	T 5–5	
November 11	Michigan Agricultural	Ypsilanti, MI	L 0–18	
November 18	Toledo YMCA*	Ypsilanti, MI	W 24–0	
*Non-conference game
