= 1925 Michigan State Normal Normalites football team =

American college football season

1925 Michigan State Normal Normalites football

MIAA champion
- Conference: Michigan Intercollegiate Athletic Association
- Record: 8–0 (5–0 MIAA)
- Head coach: Elton Rynearson (4th season)
- Captain: Phillip H. Teufer

1925 Michigan Intercollegiate Athletic Association football standings
	Conf.					Overall
Team	W		L		T	W		L		T
Michigan State Normal $	5	–	0	–	0	8	–	0	–	0
Albion	3	–	1	–	1	3	–	4	–	2
Kalamazoo	2	–	2	–	1	5	–	2	–	1
Alma	2	–	3	–	0	4	–	4	–	0
Hillsdale	2	–	3	–	0	3	–	4	–	1
Olivet	0	–	5	–	0	0	–	6	–	1
$ – Conference champion

The 1925 Michigan State Normal Normalites football team was an American football team that represented Michigan State Normal School (later renamed Eastern Michigan University) during the 1925 college football season. The Normalites compiled a perfect 8–0 record, shut out seven of eight opponents, won the Michigan Intercollegiate Athletic Association championship, and outscored all opponents by a combined total of 106 to 6.

In February 1925, Elton Rynearson was appointed as Michigan State Normal's director of sports. He previously played and coached football at the school, but left in 1920 to pursue advanced studies at the University of Michigan. He also served as Michigan State Normal's head football coach from 1925 to 1948. In the six years after Rynearson's return as head coach (1925-1930), the football team compiled a 40-4-2 record.

== Schedule ==
Date	Opponent	Site	Result	Source
October 3	Detroit freshmen*	Ypsilanti, MI	W 8–0	
October 10	at Bowling Green*	Bowling Green, OH	W 14–0	
October 17	Albion	Ypsilanti, MI	W 6–0	
October 24	Hillsdale	Ypsilanti, MI	W 20–0	
October 31	Ferris Institute*	Ypsilanti, MI	W 6–0	
November 8	at Olivet	Olivet, MI	W 20–0	
November 14	at Alma	Alma, MI	W 25–0	
November 21	at Kalamazoo	Kalamazoo, MI	W 7–6	
*Non-conference game
