= Lynn Bell =

American baseball player and football coach

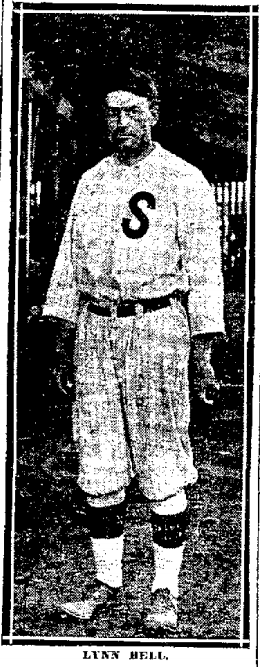
- Bell with Scranton, 1914

Biographical details
- Born: November 18, 1883; North Adams, Michigan, U.S.
- Died: May 30, 1959 (aged 75); Ypsilanti, Michigan, U.S.

Coaching career (HC unless noted)

Football
- 1918: Michigan State Normal

Head coaching record
- Overall: 1–2

Lynn Everett Bell (November 18, 1883 – May 30, 1959) was an American college football coach and professional baseball player. He played professional baseball from 1906 to 1914 and served as the head football coach for Michigan State Normal College—now known as Eastern Michigan University—in 1918.

== Early years ==
Bell was born in 1883 in North Adams, Michigan. His father, William Bell (born 1852), was a native of New York and a farmer. His mother, Mary Bell (born 1863), was a native of Ohio. At the time of the 1900 U.S. Census, the family lived in Hillsdale, Michigan, and Bell was the oldest of five children—four brothers and one sister.

== Professional baseball ==
Bell played professional baseball as a second baseman from 1906 to 1914. He played in the Southern Michigan League for Saginaw in 1906 and the Kalamazoo Kazoos in 1907 and 1908. During the 1909 and 1910 seasons, he played for the Springfield Senators in the Illinois–Indiana–Iowa League. He was sold by the Senators to the St. Louis Cardinals in 1910. One newspaper account noted that Bell made "a brilliant show" during the Cardinals' spring training camp in 1910:

Remember Lynn Bell the fast second baseman with Kinsella's Senators last season, who never let a line drive get through his territory? He's making the big leaguers sit up and take notice in the camp of the St Louis Cardinals at Little Rock, Ark. The sport scribes of the St. Louis newspapers say that Huggins, the former Cincinnati second sacker, will have to travel at a two-minute clip to win the berth away from Bell.

Bell was returned to Springfield in mid-April 1910.

At the time of the 1910 U.S. Census, Bell was residing with his parents in Ypsilanti, Michigan. His occupation was listed as baseball player.

Bell also played for the Scranton Miners of the New York State League for parts of the 1912, 1913 and 1914 seasons. He also appeared in 50 games for the Louisville Colonels of the American Association in 1912. In July 1914, he was purchased from Scranton by the Syracuse Stars to take over as the team's second baseman. According to the Syracuse Herald, "Bell was not in the best of condition when he was sold by Scranton to the Stars, but he worked hard and kept gamely in his togs when he should have been in a hospital." In the spring of 1915, Bell returned to Scranton due to the failure of the Syracuse team to pay the money due to Scranton for the sale of Bell. Bell was reportedly seeking a managerial position with the Adrian Club in the Southern Michigan League in 1915.

== Michigan State Normal ==
Bell was the head football coach at Michigan State Normal College—now known as Eastern Michigan University in Ypsilanti, and he held that position for the 1918 season. The season of 1918 was a shorter season of only three game; 1917 and 1919 seasons each had a schedule of seven games.). His coaching record at the school was 1–2. The lone win of the season was a 20–6 victory over in-state rival Hillsdale.

== Later years ==
At the time of the 1920 U.S. Census, Bell was living with his parents in Ypsilanti. He was working as a salesman for an electric company.

In September 1918, Bell completed a draft registration card in which he indicated that he was living in Ypsilanti and working as a salesman for the Detroit Edison Co.

At the time of the 1930 U.S. Census, Bell was living in Ypsilanti with his wife Ida-May Bell and their two children Mary Bell (age 6) and James Bell (age 1 year, 11 months). Bell's occupation was listed at the time as a life insurance salesman.

He died at Ypsilanti on May 30, 1959.

== Head coaching record ==
| Year | Team | Overall | Conference | Standing | Bowl/playoffs |
|---|---|---|---|---|---|
Michigan State Normal Normalites (Michigan Intercollegiate Athletic Association) (1918)
| 1915 | Michigan State Normal | 1–2 | 1–0 | | |
| Michigan State Normal: | | 1–2 | 1–0 | | |
| Total: | | 1–2 | | | |
