= Marcus Cutler =

American football coach (1875–1949)

Marcus Carter
Biographical details
- Born: January 14, 1875; Michigan, U.S.
- Died: August 16, 1949 (aged 74); Michigan, U.S.

Coaching career (HC unless noted)
- 1895: Michigan State Normal

Head coaching record
- Overall: 3–3

Marcus De Lafaytte Cutler (January 14, 1875 – August 16, 1949) was an American college football coach. He served as the head football coach at Michigan State Normal School—now known as Eastern Michigan University—for one season, in 1895, and compiling a record of 3–3.

== Early years ==
Cutler was born in 1875. His father, Elim Cutler, was a farmer in DeWitt, Michigan. At the time of the 1880 U.S. Census, Cutler was living with his parents, Elim and Martha Cutler, and an older brother, David, and older sister, Lillian.

== Coaching career ==
Bennett was the fifth head football coach at Michigan State Normal School—now known as Eastern Michigan University—in Ypsilanti, Michigan, serving for one season, in 1895, and compiling a record of 3–3.

== Later years ==
At the time of the 1900 U.S. Census, Cutler was living in Portland, Michigan working as a school teacher.

At the time of the 1910 U.S. Census, Cutler was living in Lansing, Michigan with his wife, Maud, and two sons, Donovan and M. Vernon. His occupation was listed as mail carrier for the post office.

In 1920, Cutler was living in Riley Township, Clinton County, Michigan, with his wife, Maud, and three sons, Donovan, Vernon and Neil. His occupation was listed as a farmer engaged in general farming. At the time of the 1930 U.S. Census, Cutler remained in Riley Township with his wife, Maud, as a farmer.

== Head coaching record ==
Year	Team	Overall	Conference	Standing	Bowl/playoffs
Michigan State Normal Normalites (Michigan Intercollegiate Athletic Association) (1895)
1895	Michigan State Normal	3–3	0–0		
Michigan State Normal:		3–3	0–0		
Total:		3–3			
