= Dean W. Kelley =

American lawyer (1876–1952)

Biographical details
- Born: July 12, 1876; Evart, Michigan, U.S.
- Died: November 28, 1952 (aged 76)

Coaching career (HC unless noted)
- 1892: Michigan State Normal

Head coaching record
- Overall: 2–1

Dean W. Kelley (July 12, 1876 – November 28, 1952) was an American attorney and president of the State Bar of Michigan. He was also the head football coach of the Michigan State Normal School (now known as Eastern Michigan University) for the 1892 season, compiling a record of 2–1.

Kelley studied law in St. Johns, Michigan, and later enrolled at Michigan State Normal School from which he graduated in 1899. He next attended the University of Michigan Law School. He began his practice of law in St. Johns, holding positions as city attorney, probate judge, and county prosecutor. He also taught in St. Johns and served as president of the board of education. He later lived in Lansing, Michigan, for 34 years. He was the president of the State Bar of Michigan in 1943. He was also president of the Wolverine Insurance Company for a time.

== Head coaching record ==
Year	Team	Overall	Conference	Standing	Bowl/playoffs
Michigan State Normal Normalites (Independent) (1892)
1892	Michigan State Normal	2–1			
Michigan State Normal:		2–1			
Total:		2–1			
