= Jerry Raymond =

American football coach (1928–2018)

Biographical details
- Born: July 14, 1928; Highland Park, Michigan, U.S.
- Died: February 19, 2018 (aged 89); Honor, Michigan, U.S.

Coaching career (HC unless noted)
- 1965–1966: Eastern Michigan

Head coaching record
- Overall: 8–7–2

Richard "Jerry" Raymond (July 14, 1928 – February 19, 2018) was an American football coach. He served as the head football coach at Eastern Michigan University in Ypsilanti, Michigan from 1965 to 1966, compiling a record of 8–7–2.

== Head coaching record ==
Year	Team	Overall	Conference	Standing	Bowl/playoffs
Eastern Michigan Hurons (Presidents' Athletic Conference) (1965)
1965	Eastern Michigan	3–4–1	3–1–1	3rd	
Eastern Michigan Hurons (NCAA College Division independent) (1966)
1966	Eastern Michigan	5–3–1			
Eastern Michigan:		8–7–2	3–1–1		
Total:		8–7–2			
