= Enoch Thorne =

American football coach

Biographical details
- Born: December 4, 1880; Ypsilanti, Michigan, U.S.

Coaching career (HC unless noted)
- 1898: Michigan State Normal

Head coaching record
- Overall: 1–5–2

Lorain Francis Enoch Chamberlain Thorne (December 4, 1880 – ?) was an American college football coach.

== Early years ==
Thorne was born in December 1880 in Michigan. His father, William Thorne, was a grocer in Ypsilanti, Michigan.

== Michigan State Normal School ==
Thorne was the head football coach at Michigan State Normal School—now known as Eastern Michigan University—in Ypsilanti, Michigan for the 1898 season. His coaching record at the school was 1–5–2.

== Head coaching record ==
Year	Team	Overall	Conference	Standing	Bowl/playoffs
Michigan State Normal Normalites (Michigan Intercollegiate Athletic Association) (1898)
1898	Michigan State Normal	1–5–2	0–3		
Michigan State Normal:		1–5–2	0–3		
Total:		1–5–2			

== Later years ==
At the time of the U.S. Census of 1900, Thorne was living with his parents in Ypsilanti and working in a woolen mill.

In a September 1918 draft registration card, Thorne was living in Port Huron, Michigan, and identified his present occupation as manufacturer and his employment status as "not employed." He was married at the time to Maude A. Thorne.

At the time of the 1920 U.S. Census, he was living in Port Huron with his wife Maude and daughter Charlotte. His occupation was listed as a grocery store merchant.
