= Ernest P. Goodrich =

American urban planner, engineer, and sports coach

Ernest Goodrich
Biographical details
- Born: May 7, 1874; Decatur Township, Michigan, U.S.
- Died: October 7, 1955 (aged 81); Brooklyn, New York, U.S.

Coaching career (HC unless noted)
- 1893: Michigan State Normal

Head coaching record
- Overall: 4–2

Ernest Payson Goodrich (May 7, 1874 – October 7, 1955) was an American pioneer in urban planning and engineering, the first president of the Institute of Transportation Engineers, and the third head coach of the Michigan State Normal School football team (now Eastern Michigan University).

== Early years ==
Born in Decatur Township, Michigan, in 1874, Goodrich first attended Michigan State Normal School and then the University of Michigan, where he earned a Bachelor of Arts degree in civil engineering.

== Coaching career ==
Ernest Goodrich was the third head football coach for the Michigan State Normal School football team (now called the Eastern Michigan University Eagles), located in Ypsilanti, Michigan. He held that position during the 1893 season, the third season the school fielded a football team. His coaching record at Michigan State Normal was 4–2. In addition to coaching duties, the 1893 yearbook refers to Goodrich as the first gym instructor to begin "systematic training for definite ends."

== Engineering ==
Goodrich was active in transportation, planning, and engineering administration. Early in his career he was a civil engineer for the United States Navy for four years. In 1905 he was the eighth recipient of the American Society of Civil Engineers' Collingwood Prize, awarded to young engineers (under age 35) who make contributions to engineering knowledge. From 1910 until 1916 he was a consulting engineer to the Manhattan Department of Public Works. Later in his career he worked as a consultant in private practice and he drafted city plans for Huangpu and Nanking, China, and port facility plans for Huangpu and for Bogota, Colombia. He was a planning consultant for the cities of Cincinnati, Ohio, Norfolk, Virginia, Newark, New Jersey, Springfield, Massachusetts, and New Haven, Connecticut. In 1930, he was a founding member of the Institute of Traffic Engineers (now the Institute of Transportation Engineers) and from 1930 to 1932 he served as the organization's first president. In 1951 he was the president of the American Institute of Consulting Engineers.

== Head coaching record ==
Year	Team	Overall	Conference	Standing	Bowl/playoffs
Michigan State Normal Normalites (Independent) (1893)
1893	Michigan State Normal	4–2			
Michigan State Normal:		4–2			
Total:		4–2			
