= Tony Lombardi =

American football player and coach (born 1962)

Biographical details
- Born: January 29, 1962 (age 64); Park Forest, Illinois, U.S.

Playing career
- 1980–1983: Arizona State
- Position: Running back

Coaching career (HC unless noted)
- 1986–1988: Wisconsin (DB)
- 1989–1996: Mankato State (DC)
- 1997: Eastern Michigan (LB)
- 1998–1999: Eastern Michigan (DC)
- 1999: Eastern Michigan (interim HC)
- 2000: Eastern Michigan (RB/ST)
- 2001: Chicago Enforcers (assistant)
- 2003–2005: Hinsdale Central HS (IL)
- 2006–2012: Washington HS (IA)
- 2016–2018: Wisconsin–Stout (DB)

Head coaching record
- Overall: 0–1 (college)

Tony E. Lombardi (born January 29, 1962) is an American football coach. He served as the interim head football coach at Eastern Michigan University for one game in 1999.

Lombardi is the father of Cincinnati Bengals quarterback Rocky Lombardi.

== Playing career ==
Lombardi attended Rich East High School in his hometown of Park Forest, Illinois, a southern suburb of Chicago, graduating in 1980. While in high school, he played tailback on the football team, which was coached by his father, Bob Lombardi.

Lombardi played running back for the Arizona State University Sun Devils from 1980 through 1983, and was awarded a varsity letter for all four years of play. Lombardi went undrafted in the 1984 NFL draft and signed as a free agent with the Chicago Bears. However, he did not make the team's roster.

== Coaching career ==
=== Assistant coaching ===
After spending the 1985 season as defensive coordinator for his alma mater, Rich East High School in Park Forest, Illinois, Lombardi served as defensive backs coach for the Wisconsin Badgers while earning a master's degree from the University of Wisconsin–Madison. From 1989 through 1996 he was the defensive coordinator for the NCAA Division II Mankato State Mavericks (now Minnesota State University).

In 1997, then-head coach Rick Rasnick hired him as the linebackers coach for the Eastern Michigan Eagles, and in the 1998 and 1999 seasons, he served as the team's defensive coordinator.

=== Eastern Michigan ===
The first ten games of the 1999 season were coached by Rick Rasnick, with Lombardi serving as defensive coordinator. Eastern Michigan athletic director Dave Diles Jr. fired Rasnick on November 16, and named Lombardi as the interim head coach, to serve for the final game of the season. Under Rasnick, the 1999 team had compiled a record of 4 wins and 6 losses. Lombardi's one game as EMU's head coach was a 24-30 loss to the Northern Illinois on November 20, 1999 that was played in DeKalb, Illinois.

=== High school ===
At the end of Eastern Michigan's 1999 season, none of Rasnick's assistant coaches were retained. In 2001, Lombardi became the head coach at Homewood-Flossmoor High School in Homewood, Illinois, where his father had been coach in the late 1960s, and he quickly revitalized the struggling team. However, after just one season, Lombardi left Homewood-Flossmoor moving closer to his family who lived in Plainfield, taking over at Hinsdale Central High School in Hinsdale, Illinois, a western suburb of Chicago.

After three seasons at Hinsdale Central, Lombardi was fired for using harsh language in front of players and assistant coaches. He moved on to Cedar Rapids Washington High School there he took on the responsibility of Head Strength and Conditioning coach, Head Football Assistant Track and was later the Head Baseball Coach. In 2013 following the baseball season, Lombardi resigned as Head Football and Baseball Coach and moved to West Des Moines to go into Medical Sales, following an out-of-court settlement with the Iowa Board of Educational Examiners resulting in temporary suspension of his teaching license and coaching certificate.

His oldest son Rocky was a three-star Quarterback recruit in the Class of 2017 and would commit to Michigan State, where he was three-year letterwinner and would start 9 games for the Spartans before transferring to Northern Illinois in 2021. His younger son Beau would also be recruited to play Division 1 football as he would commit to Army, where he would switch from playing Quarterback to playing on the Offensive Line.
