= Andrew Bird Glaspie =

American politician

Biographical details
- Born: November 21, 1876; Oxford, Michigan, U.S.
- Died: September 3, 1943 (aged 66); Oxford, Michigan, U.S.

Playing career
- 1897–1898: Michigan State Normal

Coaching career (HC unless noted)
- 1897: Michigan State Normal

Head coaching record
- Overall: 3–2

Andrew Bird Glaspie (November 21, 1876 – September 3, 1943) was an American soldier, politician, newspaper publisher, and college football player and coach.

== Early years and football career ==
Glaspie was born in November 1876 at Oxford, Michigan. His father, Andrew P. Glaspie, operated a general store in Oxford and was a clothier, Civil War veteran, and Michigan native. His mother, Amy (Bird) Glaspie, was also a Michigan native. He had a younger sister Harriet (born December 1878) and a younger brother Philo (born September 1880).

Glaspie attended the public grammar and high school in Oxford, Michigan. He thereafter taught school at Goodison, Michigan and Orion, Michigan. He subsequently enrolled at the Michigan State Normal School (now known as Eastern Michigan University) in Ypsilanti, Michigan.

Glaspie played college football at Michigan State Normal and was awarded letters for the 1897 and 1898 seasons. For the 1897 season, he is also listed as the "head coach" of the program in addition to being a player.

== Newspaper and political career ==
Glaspie graduated from the Michigan State Normal School in 1898. He thereupon enlisted in the 31st Michigan Infantry during the Spanish–American War.

In 1899, Glaspie returned to his family's home in Oxford, Michigan. He purchased an interest in a local newspaper called the Oxford Leader and became its editor. At the time of the 1900 U.S. Census, Glaspie was living at Oxford, and his occupation was listed as "publisher." He was still publishing the Leader as of 1910.

In May 1901, he was married to Clara M. Chamberlain. They had two children, David, who died in infancy, and Elizabeth, who was born in approximately 1907.

In approximately 1902, Glaspie was appointed as the state factory inspector by Michigan Governor Aaron T. Bliss. He served as state factory inspector from approximately 1902 to 1908. In 1908, he became the postmaster for Oxford, Michigan, a position which he continue to hold as of 1912.

In September 1918, Glaspie completed a draft registration card stating that he was living in Oxford, Michigan, and working as a salesman for the Stoll Printing Co. in Detroit.

Glaspie served in the Michigan House of Representatives from 1917 until 1922, and then served in the Michigan Senate from 1923 through 1924. Glaspie served other political posts in the state, ranging from local postmaster to serving in the Department of Conservation, where he took an interest in game hunting issues.

At the time of the 1930 U.S. Census, Glaspie was living in Oxford with his wife Clara and daughter Elizabeth. His occupation was listed as a writer for a newspaper.

In the late 1930s and early 1940s, he was working as an editorial writer and special writer for the Pontiac Daily Press (which became The Oakland Press in 1972) and residing in Oxford with his wife, Clara.

He died at Oxford in 1943.

== Head coaching record ==
Year	Team	Overall	Conference	Standing	Bowl/playoffs
Michigan State Normal Normalites (Michigan Intercollegiate Athletic Association) (1897)
1897	Michigan State Normal	3–2	1–1		
Michigan State Normal:		3–2	1–1		
Total:		3–2			
