= Hunter Forest =

American football coach

Coaching career (HC unless noted)
- 1903: Michigan State Normal

Head coaching record
- Overall: 4–4

Hunter Forest was an American college football coach. He was the head football coach at Michigan State Normal College—now known as Eastern Michigan University—in Ypsilanti, Michigan for one season, in 1903, compiling a record of 4–4.

== Head coaching record ==
Year	Team	Overall	Conference	Standing	Bowl/playoffs
Michigan State Normal Normalites (Michigan Intercollegiate Athletic Association) (1903)
1903	Michigan State Normal	4–4	0–2		
Michigan State Normal:		4–4	0–2		
Total:		4–4			
