= 1987 California Bowl =

Eastern Michigan Hurons	San Jose State Spartans
(9–2)	(10–1)
30	27
Head coach: Jim Harkema	Head coach: Claude Gilbert
	1	2	3	4	Total
Eastern Michigan	10	7	0	13	30
San Jose State	7	7	7	6	27
- Date: December 12, 1987
- Season: 1987
- Stadium: Bulldog Stadium
- Location: Fresno, California
- MVP: RB Gary Patton (Eastern Michigan)
- Referee: Gene Wurtz (WAC)
- Attendance: 24,000

The 1987 California Bowl was a college football postseason bowl game that featured the San Jose State Spartans and the Eastern Michigan Hurons.

== Background ==
In four seasons, Eastern Michigan coach Jim Harkema had the Hurons rise from 1–10 to 2–7–2 to 4–7 to 6–5. In his fifth season, they won 9 games in the regular season along with winning the Mid-American Conference title, their first conference title since 1957. San Jose State, on the other hand, had been rising for years. They finished the season with one more victory than they did the year before as they won their 2nd straight Pacific Coast Athletic Association title, which was their 3rd title in the decade, qualifying them for their third ever California Bowl. San Jose State was a 17½ point favorite coming into this game.

== Game summary ==
- Eastern Michigan - Bob Foster 1-yard run (Tim Henneghan PAT), 9:39 remaining in the 1st quarter
- San Jose State - Kenny Jackson 6-yard run (S. Olivarez PAT), 7:19 remaining in the 1st quarter
- Eastern Michigan - Tim Henneghan 42-yard field goal, 1:51 remaining in the 1st quarter
- Eastern Michigan - Bob Foster 1-yard run (Tim Henneghan PAT), 9:00 remaining in the 2nd quarter
- San Jose State - Bill Klump 1-yard pass from James Saxon (Sergio Olivarez PAT), 1:20 remaining in the 2nd quarter
- San Jose State - Johnny Johnson 12-yard pass from Mike Perez (Sergio Olivarez PAT), 2:43 remaining in the 3rd quarter
- Eastern Michigan - Gary Patton 15-yard run (Kick failed), 14:55 remaining in the 4th quarter
- San Jose State - James Saxon 16-yard run (Pass failed), 9:36 remaining in the 4th quarter
- Eastern Michigan - Craig Ostrander 32-yard pass from Ron Adams (Tim Henneghan PAT), 3:59 remaining in the 4th quarter

Gary Patton rushed for 130 yards for the Hurons (who had 212 rushing yards in total while holding the Spartans to 81) in an MVP effort.

== Aftermath ==
Despite having winning seasons the following two years, the Hurons weren't invited to a bowl game. Eastern Michigan changed the name of the team to the Eagles in 1991. The 1995 season under Rick Rasnick (after Harkema resigned in 1992, with two other coaches following him before they were fired) was their last season above .500 until 2016, when the Eagles went 7–5. Even though they finished 6–6 in 2011, the Eagles' two wins over FCS squads resulted in them not being invited to a bowl. In 2016, Eastern Michigan was finally invited to another bowl game, the Popeye's Bahamas Bowl against Old Dominion University. They were beaten 24–20.

The Spartans would return to the California Bowl in 1990, which was their last until 2006.

Eastern Michigan and San Jose State would meet once more in the 2022 Famous Idaho Potato Bowl, with the now-Eagles prevailing again, 41–27.
