= James M. Swift (American football) =

American football coach

Coaching career (HC unless noted)
- 1891: Michigan State Normal

Head coaching record
- Overall: 0–2

James M. Swift was an American college football coach. He was the first head football coach at Michigan State Normal School—now known as Eastern Michigan University—and is credited for introducing the sport of American football to the school.

== Early years ==
Swift attended B.M.C. Durfee High School, the only high school in Fall River, Massachusetts, where he played football alongside Bernard Trafford, who captained the Harvard Crimson football team in 1891 and 1892.

== Coaching career ==
Swift was the first head football coach of the Michigan State Normal School football team (now Eastern Michigan University), located in Ypsilanti, Michigan. The school's 1893 yearbook credits him with introducing "scientific football" to the school. He held the position of head football coach for the 1891 season. His coaching record at Michigan State Normal was 0–2.

== Head coaching record ==
Year	Team	Overall	Conference	Standing	Bowl/playoffs
Michigan State Normal Normalites (Independent) (1891)
1891	Michigan State Normal	0–2			
Michigan State Normal:		0–2			
Total:		0–2			
