= Curry Hicks =

American football coach and professor (1885–1964)

- Curry Hicks as athletic director at UMass Amherst

Biographical details
- Born: January 17, 1885; Enfield, New York, U.S.
- Died: February 28, 1964 (aged 79); Tucson, Arizona, U.S.

Coaching career (HC unless noted)
- 1910: Michigan State Normal

Administrative career (AD unless noted)
- 1911–1948: Massachusetts / Massachusetts State / UMass

Head coaching record
- Overall: 0–5–1

Curry Starr Hicks (January 17, 1885 – February 28, 1964) was an American college football coach, athletic director, and professor of physical education.

== Early years ==
Hicks was born in January 1885 at Enfield, New York. At the time of the 1900 U.S. Census, he was listed as a student, and as the son of Samuel Hicks and Fannie Hicks of Hamlin, Michigan. He enrolled at Michigan Agricultural College (now known as Michigan State University) but left the school due to lack of money. He worked for a time as a math teacher and high school principal.

== Michigan State Normal ==
Hicks later enrolled at Michigan State Normal College (now known as Eastern Michigan University) in Ypsilanti, Michigan. He received a bachelor's degree in physical education from the school in 1909. In 1909, he attended Amherst College on a Hitchcock Fellowship before returning to the Michigan State Normal School. He was the head football coach at the Michigan State Normal School—now known as Eastern Michigan University—for one season, in 1910, compiling a record of 0–5–1. As of the conclusion of the 1910 season, this ranks him #37 at Eastern Michigan in total wins and #36 at the school in winning percentage (.083).

=== Head coaching record ===
Year	Team	Overall	Conference	Standing	Bowl/playoffs
Michigan State Normal Normalites (Michigan Intercollegiate Athletic Association) (1910)
1910	Michigan State Normal	0–5–1	0–2–1		
Michigan State Normal:		0–5–1	0–2–1		
Total:		0–5–1			

== UMass ==
Curry S. Hicks from UMass Library Special Collections

In 1911, after receiving a degree from Michigan State Normal College, Hicks was hired as the athletic director at Massachusetts Agricultural College (now known as University of Massachusetts Amherst) in Amherst, Massachusetts. He was the school's first director of athletics and student health and held the post for 38 years until his retirement in 1949. During his time as athletic director, he led a construction program of $400,000 worth of athletic facilities, including Alumni Field and the physical education building that was completed in 1931. The latter building was renamed the Curry Hicks Physical Education Building (also commonly known as the "Curry Hicks Cage") in June 1941. In his official biography, the UMass Library states:

Curry S. Hicks pioneered the University's athletics program as it transitioned from the Massachusetts Agricultural College to the University of Massachusetts. Hicks led the charge to build modern athletic fields and gymnasia and during his tenure, many of the University's teams climbed to new heights of excellence. ... On his retirement in 1949, Hicks left behind a thoroughly modernized athletics program ...

Hicks was also a professor of physical education and the head of the school's Division of Physical Education and Hygiene. He was credited with building up the physical education curriculum at UMass for both men and women. His publications include The influence of faculty supervision on the moral effects of athletics in high schools and colleges (1912), and Community Playgrounds (1938).

Hicks' wife, Adeline (Herrick) Hicks, was a classmate of Hicks in the Michigan State Normal College Class of 1909. She established the physical education program for women at the University of Massachusetts and became the head of physical education for women. She was an early advocate of modern dance as part of the physical education curriculum.

In a draft registration card completed at the time of World War I, Hicks reported that he was living in Amherst and working as a college teacher for Massachusetts Agricultural College.

== Death ==
After his retirement in 1949, Hicks and his wife Adeline lived in Tucson, Arizona. He died there in February 1964 at age 78.
