= Eastern Michigan Eagles football =

Football team of Eastern Michigan University

2026 Eastern Michigan Eagles football team
- First season: 1891; 135 years ago
- Athletic director: Scott Wetherbee
- Head coach: Chris Creighton; 12th season, 62–83 (.428)
- Location: Ypsilanti, Michigan
- Stadium: Rynearson Stadium (capacity: 26,188)
- NCAA division: Division I FBS
- Conference: MAC
- Colors: Green and white
- All-time record: 500–638–47 (.442)
- Bowl record: 2–6 (.250)

Conference championships
- MIAA: 1896, 1925 MCC: 1927, 1928, 1929, 1930 IIAC: 1954, 1955, 1957 MAC: 1987
- Rivalries: Central Michigan (rivalry); Western Michigan (rivalry)

Uniforms
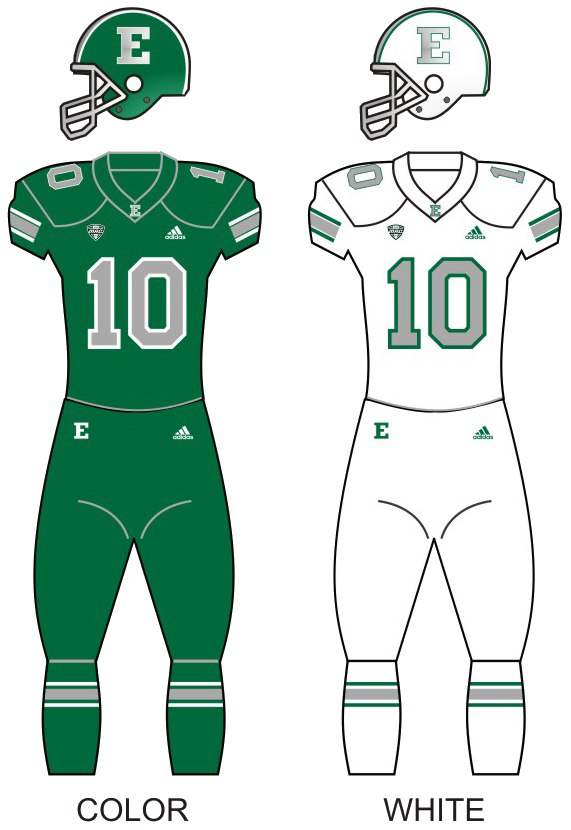
- Fight song: "Eagles Fight Song", "Go Green", "Our Pledge"
- Mascot: Swoop
- Marching band: Pride of the Peninsula
- Outfitter: Adidas
- Website: EMUEagles.com

The Eastern Michigan Eagles are a college football program at Eastern Michigan University. They compete in Division I Football Bowl Subdivision (FBS) and the Mid-American Conference. Past names include "Michigan State Normal College Normalites" (1899 to 1928), "Michigan State Normal College Hurons" (1929 to 1955), and "Eastern Michigan Hurons" (1956 to 1990).

Since 1891, Eastern Michigan University has compiled an all-time record of 490–622–47, fielding a team in each year except 1944. The team has achieved five undefeated seasons, in 1906, 1925, 1927, 1943 (holding opponents scoreless), and 1945. The team saw its greatest period of success from 1925 through 1939 under head coach Elton Rynearson, for whom their home field, Rynearson Stadium, is named. Among the lowest periods in the team's history was a 27-game losing streak in the early 1980s; under head coach Mike Stock the team was held scoreless seven times and posted an average margin of loss of 18 points per game.

== History ==
=== Early history (1891–1916) ===
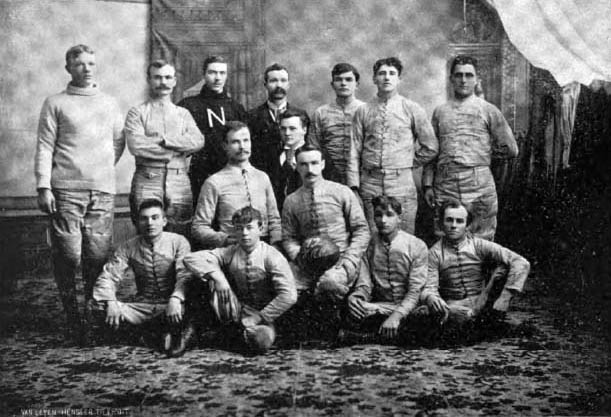
The 1892 Michigan State Normal team

Michigan State Normal School first fielded a football team in 1891. Initially the team had no official nickname, being known variously as the "Normalites" or the "Men from Ypsi". From 1892 to 1926, the team competed in the Michigan Intercollegiate Athletic Association, winning conference championships in 1896 and 1925. (Although the MIAA did not recognize football as an official sport until 1894, MIAA teams competed against each other as early as 1891.) After playing football for three years at the University of Michigan, including being on the undefeated 1898 Michigan Wolverines football team that won the university's first Western Conference championship, Clayton Teetzel travelled six miles east to Ypsilanti, where he became the first person to coach the Michigan State Normal College football team for more than one year. From 1900 through 1902, his teams compiled a 6–14–1 record.

The 1916 season was cut short after four games when Coach Elmer Mitchell and four players contracted smallpox; the last game was played October 28 against the University of Detroit.

=== Elton Rynearson era (1917–1948) ===
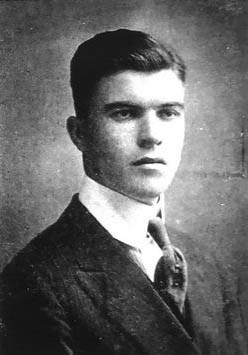
Coach Elton Rynearson had several tenures as head coach between 1917–20 and 1925–48

Following the smallpox–shortened 1916 season, Elton Rynearson was hired to replace Elmer Mitchell. Although Rynearson's offense was more effective, outscoring opponents 111 to 82, more than half of the scoring came in a single game, a 63–0 rout of Central Michigan, and the team ended the season with a 3–4 record. After the shortened 3-game 1918 season was coached by Lynn Bell, Rynearson returned to coach the 1919 squad to their first winning season in four years. After another winning season in 1920, other coaches assumed the duties for four years, during which the team managed a 9–15–4 record. Rynearson's return in 1925 sparked the most successful period in school history. From 1925 through 1930, the team achieved a 40–4–2 record, including perfect seasons in 1925 and 1927. From 1925 through 1927 they outscored opponents 405 points to 31 and registered 19 shutouts. They won the Michigan Intercollegiate Athletic Association Championship in 1925, and won the Michigan Collegiate Conference championships in 1927, 1928, 1929, and 1930. In 1929, the Michigan State Normal College Men's Union sponsored a contest to determine a nickname. A three-person committee chose "Hurons" from the contest entries; the runner-up name was "Pioneers". The name Hurons was submitted by Gretchen Borst and George Hanner, both MSNC students. It is likely that Hanner got the idea from the Huron Hotel in downtown Ypsilanti, where he was employed.

Although less dominant, Rynearson's teams continued to have success throughout the 1930s, never having a losing season until the teams of 1940 and 1941 combined for a 2–10–3 record. The 1943 and 1945 teams (there was no team in 1944) were again successful, combining for a 7–0–1 record. However, following the end of World War II, Rynearson's teams again struggled, and he ended his coaching career on a streak of three losing seasons from 1946 through 1948. His 26 seasons as head coach are double those of the next-longest serving coach, Fred Trosko, and no Eastern Michigan University football coach has reached even half of Rynearson's win total of 114 games.

=== Harry Ockerman era (1949–1951) ===
Following Rynearson's retirement in 1948, Harry Ockerman was the head coach for three undistinguished years, in which he compiled a 7–19–0 record, including a winless first season.

=== Fred Trosko era (1952–1964) ===
In July 1952, Fred Trosko was hired as head football coach at Michigan State Normal College. Trosko had been a star college running back at Michigan under head coach Fritz Crisler. The team improved markedly during Trosko's early years as head coach. In his first seven seasons, the team attained a record of 41–19–2, including a 7–1–1 record in 1953, a 8–1–0 record in 1954 and a 7–2–0 record in 1955.

The team was not able to sustain the success, however, and for the remained of his thirteen seasons Trosko's teams struggled, finishing two consecutive seasons winless (1960 and 1961, both 0–8–1), and only managing two additional winning seasons, going 6–3–0 in 1957 and 4–3–0 in 1964, Trosko's final year. In thirteen seasons, the second longest tenure of any head coach at the school, Trosko had nearly as many losses as Rynearson had in twenty-six seasons.

His teams won Interstate Intercollegiate Athletic Conference ("IIAC") championships in 1954 and 1957. The team's success came to an abrupt end in 1959. Trosko's teams had a 29-game winless streak (0–27–2) starting with the third game of the 1959 season and continuing through the fifth game of the 1962 season. The precipitous decline followed the decision of the Eastern Michigan administration not to follow an IIAC policy that allowed member schools to award scholarships. Competing with non-scholarship athletes against conference schools with scholarship athletes, Trosko's Eastern Michigan teams were unable to compete.

In August 1965, Trosko announced his resignation as the school's head football coach, and it was reported that the resignation was the result of "an apparent break with school administrators over policy." Trosko had the second longest tenure of any head coach at the school. He also taught at Eastern Michigan and remained on the faculty at Eastern Michigan after retiring as football coach. He ultimately retired in 1981 as a professor emeritus. In 1982, he was inducted into the Eastern Michigan Sports Hall of Fame.

=== Jerry Raymond era (1965–1966) ===
Jerry Raymond was the head football coach of the Hurons for the 1965 and 1966 seasons, and his coaching record at the school was 8 wins, 7 losses and 2 ties. As of the conclusion of the 2010 season, this ranks him No. 12 at Eastern Michigan in total wins and No. 13 at the school in winning percentage (.529).

=== Dan Boisture era (1967–1973) ===
In July 1967, Dan Boisture was hired as head coach at Eastern Michigan University. He later commented that he was willing to go to a smaller school, saying, "There weren't many jobs open...Joan and I looked at the campus. It was a cute campus." Under his leadership, the team produced the longest period of sustained success since Elton Rynearson's days. The team posted winning seasons in all seven years of Boisture's coaching, including a 13-game winning streak that remains a school record. His 1971 squad finished the regular season 7–0–2, only allowing one touchdown in the last five games, before losing to Louisiana Tech in the Pioneer Bowl, the first bowl trip in school history. Boisture was named NCAA District Four "coach of the year" in 1971. Boisture's tenure at Eastern Michigan is also notable for the construction of Rynearson Stadium. Boisture's teams played their first two seasons at the old field, near the corner of Oakwood and Washtenaw, just west of McKenny Union. In 1969, the new stadium, which was considered off-campus at the time, opened with a capacity of 15,500. Boisture's bowl-bound 1971 team played for one of the few sellout crowds in the stadium's history, a 0–0 tie against Eastern Kentucky on October 16, 1971, which drew 17,360 spectators. In February 1974, Boisture left Eastern Michigan to coach the Detroit Wheels, in the Central Division of the World Football League. The Wheels played their home games at Rynearson Stadium after they were unable to secure an agreement with Tiger Stadium in Detroit or Michigan Stadium in Ann Arbor. In 1972, Eastern Michigan joined the Mid-American Conference, in which they still compete.

=== George Mans and Ed Chlebek eras (1974–1977) ===
In February 1974, Michigan assistant coach George Mans was hired as the head football coach of the Eagles, where he remained for the 1974 and 1975 seasons. In his first season as head coach, Mans' team started the season with only one win in the first six games, but the team finished strong, going 3–1–1 in the final five games. In May 1976, Mans announced his resignation as Eastern Michigan's coach in what the Associated Press described as a "surprise move." According to one newspaper report, Mans resigned "when it became apparent that EMU would place a greater emphasis on basketball, hiring former Detroit Pistons Coach Ray Scott." Mans compiled an 8–12–1 record in two seasons as the head football coach at Eastern Michigan. Coach Ed Chlebek came to Eastern Michigan from the University of Notre Dame, where he was an assistant under Dan Devine and coached future Pro Football Hall of Fame quarterback Joe Montana. Chlebek's Eagles compiled a 10–12 record from 1976 to 1977. After an impressive 8–3 campaign in 1977, Chlebek left EMU to accept the position of head football coach at Boston College.

=== Mike Stock era (1978–1982) ===
Mike Stock's tenure as head coach is primarily remembered for a school-record 27-game losing streak from 1980 through 1982, including a winless season in 1981. He was fired after the team lost the first three games of 1982, including a 49–12 pasting at Louisiana Tech and 35–0 shutout at Miami University, bringing the losing streak to 22 games; the team went on to lose five more consecutive games under interim coach Bob LaPointe before the streak was broken with a 9–7 win over Kent State on November 6, 1982. Stock's teams were held scoreless seven times, his teams were outscored by a total of 809 points — nearly 18 points per game, and his final record of 6–38–1 gives him a 14.4% win percentage, easily the lowest of any coach to remain at Eastern more than one season. Stock continued to coach football both at the collegiate level and the professional level, both in the United States Football League and the National Football League, until his retirement following the 2008 NFL season, but this was his only head coaching position.

=== Jim Harkema era (1983–1992) ===
Coach Jim Harkema came to EMU from Grand Valley State and lead EMU to four consecutive winning seasons from 1986 to 1989, including Eastern's only MAC championship in 1987, when the team went to the 1987 California Bowl and upset 17½ point favorite San Jose State for the only bowl game win in school history until the 2022 Famous Idaho Potato Bowl, when they again beat San Jose State. The 1988 and 1989 teams each finished in second place in the conference. Harkema's teams struggled from 1990 to 1992, and Harkema was fired after an 0–4 start to the 1992 season after 2–9 and 3–7–1 campaigns in 1990 and 1991.

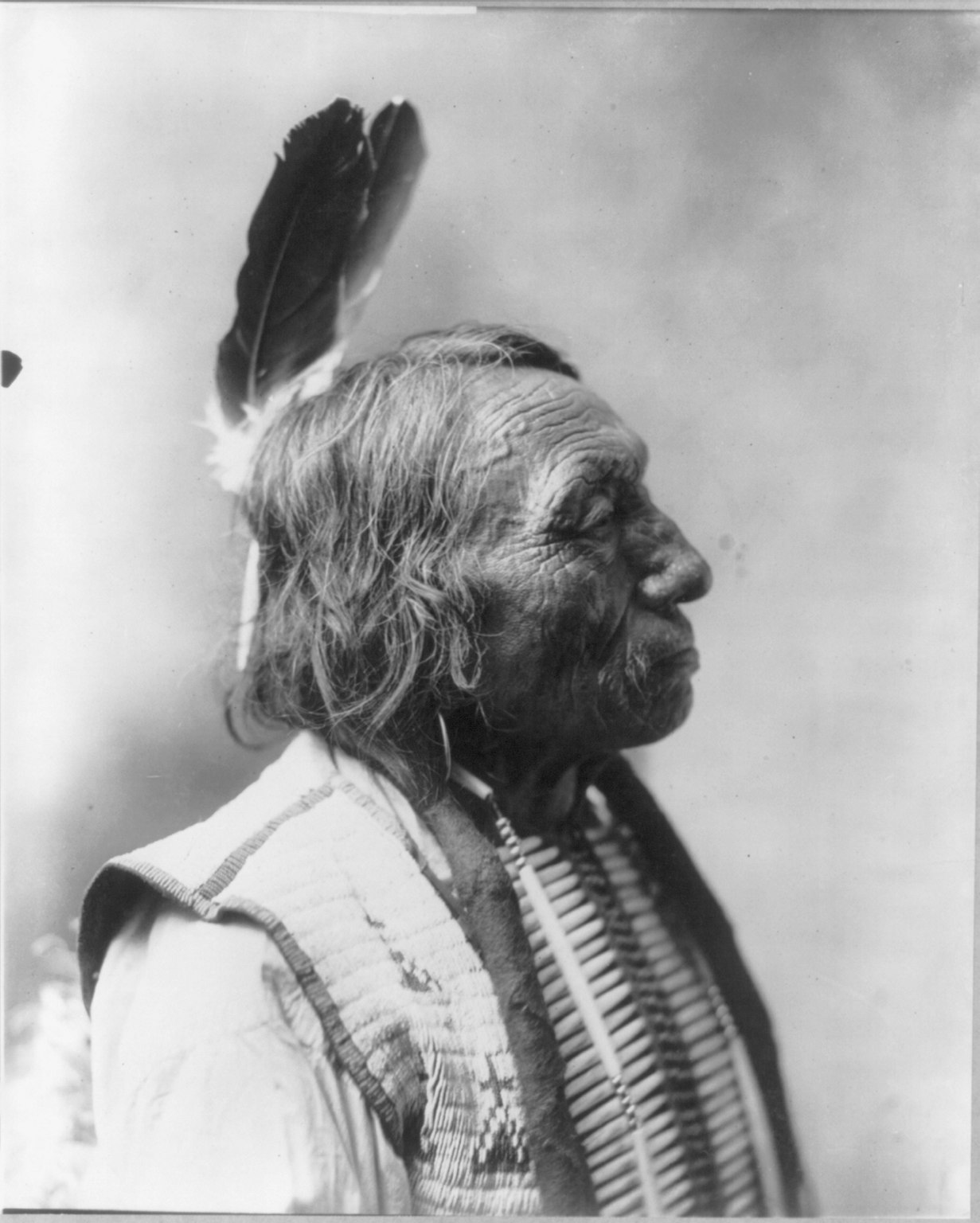
Depiction of Native Americans in logos and names of athletic teams were accused of promoting racial stereotypes so the university dropped the "Huron" logo

In October 1988, the Michigan Department of Civil Rights issued a report suggesting that all schools using Native American logos or imagery should drop them. An EMU committee considered the change and recommended three possible replacement nicknames, Eagles, Green Hornets, and Express, from which the Board of Regents voted to accept the nickname "Eagles". The change became official on May 22, 1991. The controversy over the nickname continues to this day, as many former students and faculty were angered that a unique name like Hurons was replaced by a common name like Eagles, and many alumni have refused to donate money to the school until the name Hurons is restored. An official chapter of the EMU Alumni Association, the Huron Restoration Chapter, seeks to bring back the name and claims to have the support of Chief Leaford Bearskin of the Wyandot Tribe of Oklahoma and former Grand Chief Max Gros-Louis of the Huron-Wendat Nation of Quebec.

=== Ron Cooper era (1993–1994) ===
Next, EMU turned to a young, up-and-coming assistant coach to right the ship. Ron Cooper was hired as EMU's head coach. Cooper had been an assistant at Notre Dame and Minnesota under head coach Lou Holtz. Cooper had also been an assistant at East Carolina and UNLV. Cooper's Eagles compiled a 4–7 mark in 1993 and a 5–6 record in 1995. Cooper left EMU after two seasons to accept the position of head football coach at Louisville.

=== Rick Rasnick era (1995–1999) ===
On January 3, 1995, Utah offensive coordinator Rick Rasnick was interviewed by Eastern Michigan, and the following day he was hired as head coach with a five-year contract. Rasnick brought a more open, pass-oriented offense to Eastern Michigan than his predecessor, Ron Cooper had used. Rasnick's offense featured Charlie Batch as quarterback in 1995 and 1997 (Batch sat out 1996 with an injury).

During his time at EMU, Rasnick's recruiting noticeably favored junior-college transfers rather than high school seniors. On November 16, 1999, three days after a 29–26 loss at Central Michigan, Eastern Michigan Athletic Director Dave Diles held a press conference to announce that he had fired Rasnick as head coach.

=== Jeff Woodruff era (2000–2003) ===
Jeff Woodruff was the head football coach at Eastern Michigan for four seasons, from 2000 until 2003. Woodruff's first season, in which the team posted a 3–8 record turned out to be the best of his tenure. Following a 38–10 loss to Central Michigan on November 1, 2003, athletic director Dave Diles, Jr. fired Woodruff, saying, "Jeff Woodruff has helped develop our program with quality young men, but the team is not on the competitive level that we felt should be after four years."

=== Jeff Genyk era (2004–2008) ===
In 2004, EMU hired Northwestern quarterbacks coach Jeff Genyk as head coach. In his first season, 2004, Genyk helped lead EMU to a 4–4 Mid-American Conference record, the best record since the 1999 squad went 4–4 in Mid-American Conference play, and a 4–7 overall record. In addition, Genyk directed the Eagles to the Michigan MAC championship with wins over both in-state league rivals, Western Michigan and Central Michigan, for the first time since the 1986 season.

The 2005 season, Jeff Genyk's second as head coach, saw limited improvement as the Eagles finished with a 4–7 overall record (the same as 2004) and a 3–5 MAC mark. However, that final record could just as easily have been 6–5, 7–4, or even 8–3, as the Eagles dropped two one-point games (Miami University, Ball State), one two-point game (at Cincinnati), and one eight-point game (Western Michigan). In 2006, EMU had just one win, the homecoming game against Toledo. Once again, the total could have been a lot higher, with six losses coming only by one possession. They lost two games by 8 (at Northwestern, at Kent State), one game in overtime by 7 (Central Michigan), one game by 6 (Ohio), and two games by 3 (at Bowling Green, at Western Michigan).

After tallying a 3–9 record during the 2008 campaign and going 16–42 overall during his five years at the helm, Genyk was fired. He coached the season's final game against Central Michigan, a 56–52 upset.

=== Ron English era (2009–2013) ===
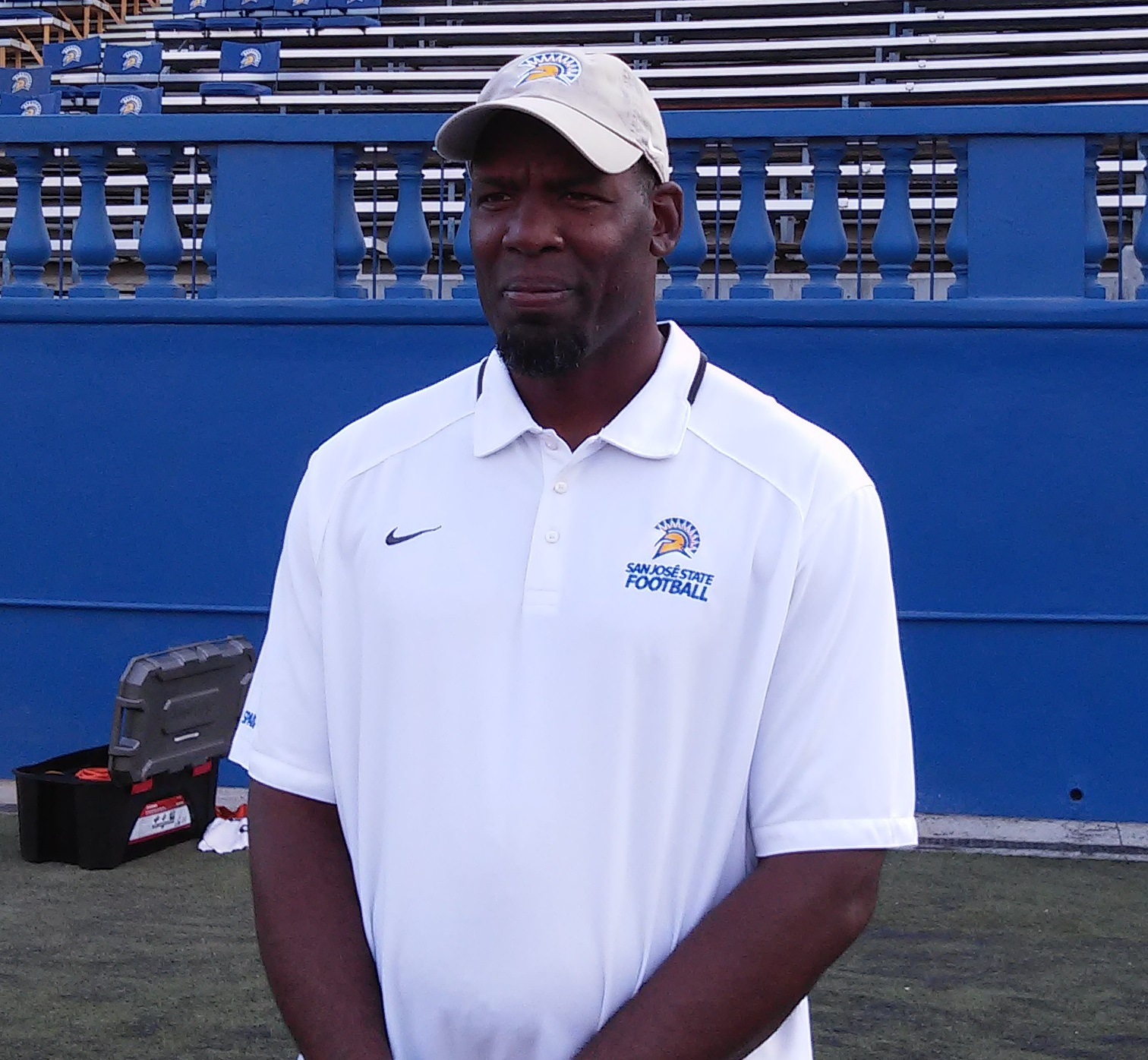
Coach Ron English

Following Genyk's firing, Ron English, former defensive coordinator at the University of Michigan and the University of Louisville, was named head coach of the Eastern Michigan football program. At the time of his hiring, English was one of five African American head coaches in major college football; the others were Kansas's Turner Gill, Miami's Randy Shannon, Houston's Kevin Sumlin, New Mexico's Mike Locksley;. Mike Haywood became the sixth when Miami University (Ohio) hired him just days later. Although his hiring brought a lot of excitement to the program, he failed to capitalize in his first season, leading the team to an 0–12 record, the first winless season for EMU since 1981. Despite English's background as a defensive coach, the team allowed an average of more than 38 points per game, losing 10 games by double-digit margins, 6 of them by more than 20 points.

English was abruptly fired with three games to go in the 2014 season. Less than 24 hours before the Eagles' game against Western Michigan, athletic director Heather Lyke obtained a tape of an obscenity-laced tirade English delivered to his secondary while reviewing film in October. The screed included at least one homophobic slur. Lyke said that English's language was "wholly inappropriate," and not acceptable in a student setting. English later apologized for what he described as a loss of poise.

=== Chris Creighton era (2014–present) ===
On December 23, 2013, Drake head coach Chris Creighton was hired as English's replacement. In his first season with the Eagles, they finished 2–10 and last in the Mid-American Conference. In his second season, they finished 1–11 with no conference wins, the first time since 2009. In his third season, the Eagles finished the regular season 7–5 (a six-game turnaround) while qualifying for the Bahamas Bowl, the first bowl game for the program in 29 years. Eastern Michigan lost to Old Dominion, 24–20. On March 1, 2017, the Eastern Michigan athletics office announced a proposed plan for athletic facilities upgrades, including a new building that can be utilized for indoor practice sessions. The new facility is anticipated to be approximately 70,000 square feet, utilize a turf playing surface, improved weight room, as well as the addition of up to ten suites facing the stadium. A new scoreboard inside of Rynearson Stadium would also be added. In 2018, Creighton's fifth season, Eastern Michigan became bowl eligible once again with a 27–7 win over Akron. In eight quarters of play, including that game and a week earlier vs. Central Michigan, the EMU defense did not allow a single offensive score by their opponents. Creighton and the Eagles pulled road upsets of Big Ten Conference teams 3 consecutive years, from 2017 to 2019, with wins over Rutgers, Purdue, and Illinois. On September 17, 2022, Eastern Michigan defeated Arizona State, 30–21, in their first win over a Pac-12 Conference opponent.

== Conference affiliations ==
EMU has been a member of the following conferences.

- Independent (1891–1893)
- Michigan Intercollegiate Athletic Association (1894)
- Independent (1895)
- Michigan Intercollegiate Athletic Association (1896–1901)
- Independent (1902–1919)
- Michigan Intercollegiate Athletic Association (1920–1925)
- Independent (1926)
- Michigan Collegiate Conference (1927–1930)
- Independent (1931–1949)
- Interstate Intercollegiate Athletic Conference (1950–1961)
- Presidents' Athletic Conference (1964–1965)
- Independent (1966–1975)
- Mid-American Conference (1976–present)

== Conference championships ==
The Eagles have won 10 conference titles.

Season	Conference	Head coach	Overall record	Conference record
1896	Michigan Intercollegiate Athletic Association	Fred W. Green	4–1	2–0
1925	Michigan Intercollegiate Athletic Association	Elton Rynearson	8–0	5–0
1927	Michigan Collegiate Conference	Elton Rynearson	8–0	3–0
1928	Michigan Collegiate Conference	Elton Rynearson	7–1	3–0
1929†	Michigan Collegiate Conference	Elton Rynearson	5–1–2	2–0–1
1930	Michigan Collegiate Conference	Elton Rynearson	6–1	3–0
1954†	Illinois Intercollegiate Athletic Conference	Fred Trosko	8–1	5–1
1955†	Illinois Intercollegiate Athletic Conference	Fred Trosko	7–2	5–1
1957	Illinois Intercollegiate Athletic Conference	Fred Trosko	6–3	6–0
1987	Mid-American Conference	Jim Harkema	10–2	7–1

† Co-champions

=== Michigan Intercollegiate Athletic Association ===
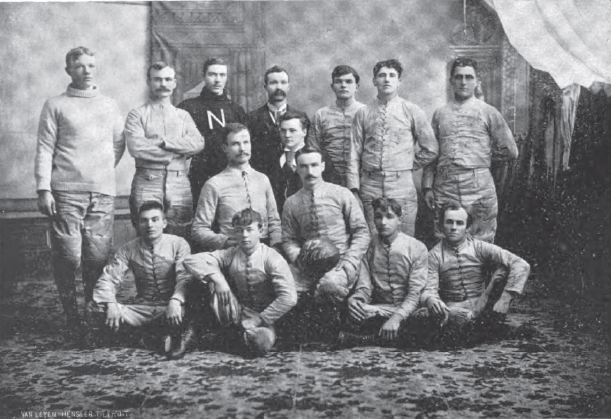
1892 Michigan State Normal football team

Michigan State Normal College was admitted to the Michigan Intercollegiate Athletic Association in 1892. Although the conference did not recognize football as an official sport until 1894, teams within the conference competed with each other as early as 1891. MSNC's first game against an MIAA opponent was a 30–10 victory over Albion College on November 2, 1892. In 1896, MSNC won their MIAA games by a combined score of 70–0, earning them the conference championship. Despite an undefeated season in 1906, the conference championship was won by Olivet College, whose team played, and won, more conference games. In 1925, with the return of Rynearson as coach, the team achieved another undefeated season and again took the MIAA championship, before leaving the conference a year later.

=== Michigan Collegiate Conference ===
Michigan State Normal College dominated the brief history of the Michigan Collegiate Conference (which consisted of MSNC, Central Michigan University, and Western Michigan University), winning the conference championships in each of the four seasons (1927, 1928, 1929, and 1930) it lasted, including an undefeated season in 1927. The team was never defeated in Michigan Collegiate Conference play. This marked what remains one of the most successful periods in the history of the team.

=== Interstate Intercollegiate Athletic Conference ===
In twelve seasons in the Interstate Intercollegiate Athletic Conference, Eastern Michigan won three championships: in 1954, in 1955, and in 1957. All came under the leadership of head coach Fred Trosko.

=== Mid-American Conference ===
In 1987, Eastern won its only Mid-American Conference championship, marking the high point of four consecutive winning seasons, and the completion of a turnaround from the school's 27-game losing streak earlier in the decade.

== Bowl games ==
Eastern Michigan has participated in eight bowl games. In 1971 as a Division II school in their last season as an independent team, Eastern Michigan went 7–0–2 in the regular season, before losing 3–14 to Louisiana Tech in the Pioneer Bowl in Wichita Falls, Texas. In 1987, following the school's only MAC championship, and their first in any conference in 30 years, the team went on to upset 17½ point favorite San Jose State University in the California Bowl in Fresno, California, for the first bowl game win in school history. In 2016, the Eagles participated in the Bahamas Bowl after finishing the regular season 7–5, their most wins in a season since 1989 when they also had 7 victories. In 2022, Eastern played San Jose State again in the 2022 Famous Idaho Potato Bowl. Despite being down early, a blocked extra point returned for 2 points turned the game around for an EMU victory, 41–27.

Year	Bowl	Opponent	Result
1971	Pioneer Bowl	Louisiana Tech	L 3–14
1987	California Bowl	San Jose State	W 30–27
2016	Bahamas Bowl	Old Dominion	L 20–24
2018	Camellia Bowl	Georgia Southern	L 21–23
2019	Quick Lane Bowl	Pittsburgh	L 30–34
2021	LendingTree Bowl	Liberty	L 20–56
2022	Famous Idaho Potato Bowl	San Jose State	W 41–27
2023	68 Ventures Bowl	South Alabama	L 10–59

== Head coaches ==
Many of EMU's head coaches have had brief tenures with the program; 18 head coaches served for one season or less. Among the more notable head coaches at EMU have been Clayton Teetzel (1900–1902), Henry Schulte (1906–1908), Elton Rynearson (1917, 1919–1920, 1925–1948), Fred Trosko (1952–1964), Dan Boisture (1967–1973), George Mans (1974–75), Mike Stock (1978–1982), Jim Harkema (1983–1992), Rick Rasnick (1995–1999), Jeff Woodruff (2000–2003), Jeff Genyk (2004–2008), and Ron English (2009–2013). Rynearson was the longest-serving and winningest coach, with a record of 114-58-15 over 26 seasons, while Vern Bennett (1894) posted the highest winning percentage, 71.4%. Tony Lombardi was the shortest-tenured coach, leading the team only for the final game of the 1999 season.

No.	Coach	Seasons	Years	Record	Pct.
1	James M. Swift	1891	1	0–2	.000
2	Dean W. Kelley	1892	1	2–1	.667
3	Ernest P. Goodrich	1893	1	4–2	.667
4	Verne S. Bennett	1894	1	5–2	.714
5	Marcus Cutler	1895	1	3–3	.500
6	Fred W. Green	1896	1	4–1	.800
7	A. Bird Glaspie	1897	1	2–3	.400
8	Enoch C. Thorne	1898	1	1–5–2	.250
9	Dwight Watson	1899	1	1–1–1	.500
10	Clayton T. Teetzel	1900–1902	3	4–14–1	.237
11	Hunter Forest	1903	1	4–4	.500
12	Daniel H. Lawrence	1904–1905	2	10–6	.625
13	Henry F. Schulte	1906–1908	3	9–6–1	.594
14	Clare Hunter	1909	1	2–4	.333
15	Curry Hicks	1910	1	0–5–1	.083
16	Dwight Wilson	1911	1	3–4	.429
17	Leroy Brown	1912–1913	2	6–5–2	.538
18	Thomas Ransom	1914	1	3–2–1	.583
19	Elmer Mitchell	1915–1916	2	5–4–2	.545
20	Elton Rynearson	1917, 1919–1920, 1925–1948	27	114–58–15	.650
21	Lynn Bell	1918	1	1–2	.333
22	Joseph McCulloch	1921–1922	2	6–5–2	.538
23	James M. Brown	1923–1924	2	4–10–2	.313
24	Harry Ockerman	1949–1951	3	7–19	.269
25	Fred Trosko	1952–1964	13	50–56–4	.473
26	Jerry Raymond	1965–1966	2	8–7–2	.529
27	Dan Boisture	1967–1973	7	45–20–3	.684
28	George Mans	1974–1975	2	8–12–1	.405
29	Ed Chlebek	1976–1977	2	10–12	.455
30	Mike Stock	1978–1982	5	6–38–1	.144
Int.	Bob LaPointe	1982	<1	1–6–1	.188
31	Jim Harkema	1983–1992	10	41–57–5	.422
Int.	Jan Quarless	1992	<1	1–6	.143
32	Ron Cooper	1993–1994	2	9–13	.409
33	Rick Rasnick	1995–1999	5	20–34	.370
Int.	Tony Lombardi	1999	<1	0–1	.000
34	Jeff Woodruff	2000–2003	4	9–34	.209
Int.	Al Lavan	2003	<1	2–1	.667
35	Jeff Genyk	2004–2008	5	16–42	.276
36	Ron English	2009–2013	5	11–46	.193
Int.	Stan Parrish	2013	<1	1–2	.333
37	Chris Creighton	2014–present	12	61–83	.424

== Facilities ==
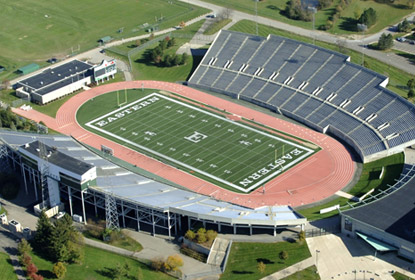
Rynearson Stadium in 2007

Around mid-century, Eastern Michigan played its home games at a small field near the corner of Oakwood and Washtenaw, just west of McKenny Union. In 1969, the university constructed Rynearson Stadium, named for former coach Elton Rynearson. With a 30,200 person seating capacity, Rynearson Stadium is among the smallest to host an FBS team; the largest attendance at an EMU game at Rynearson was 25,009, on September 16, 1995, for a 51–6 win over UNLV. Rynearson was one of only two stadiums in the Mid-American Conference with a track around the football field for a time. Lighting was added to the stadium in 1974, and the playing surface has been FieldTurf since 2005. The second and current FieldTurf surface, a gray surface, was installed in 2014. This made Rynearson Stadium only the second FBS venue with a non-traditional field color, after the famous blue surface of Albertsons Stadium at Boise State. Two EMU games at Rynearson have been sell-outs: a 24–31 loss to Western Michigan on October 22, 1988, drew 23,003 (listed capacity at the time was 22,227), and a 0–0 tie against Eastern Kentucky on October 16, 1971, drew 17,360 (capacity was 15,500).

In late 2009, Eastern Michigan University broke ground on an indoor practice facility, which was completed that academic year. In addition to being used for football practices, the air-supported structure is used by Eastern Michigan's soccer, baseball, softball, and golf programs. This is one of only three such air-supported facilities used by Football Bowl Subdivision programs. According to then-Athletic Director Derrick Gragg a traditionally constructed facility of the same size would have cost approximately five times more.

In 20xx, the track around the field was removed.

== Rivalries ==
=== Central Michigan ===
Central Michigan holds a 62–30–6 lead in the series as of 2020.

=== Michigan MAC Trophy ===
Eastern Michigan participates in one trophy series, the Michigan MAC Trophy, against the Central Michigan Chippewas and Western Michigan Broncos. Since the Michigan MAC Trophy was created in 2005, Eastern Michigan has won it four times, sweeping the series in 2007, and retaining it in 2008 when all three schools went 1–1 in the round robin series. After defeating both Central and Western in 2011, Eastern reclaimed the trophy, tying them with Central Michigan for the most Michigan MAC championships in the series. Again during the 2012 season, all three teams went 1–1 in the round robin series, and EMU again retained the trophy.

== Pro Football Hall of Fame ==
One former Eastern Michigan alumnus has been inducted into the Pro Football Hall of Fame.

Name	Position	Inducted
George Allen	Head coach	2006

== Future non-conference opponents ==
Announced schedules as of December 5, 2025.

2026	2027	2028	2029	2030	2031	2035	2036
San Jose State	San Diego State	LIU	at San Jose State	Mercyhurst	at Marshall	at Middle Tennessee	Middle Tennessee
at Michigan State	Mercyhurst	at Indiana	Georgia Southern	at Michigan			
at Wisconsin	at Michigan	at Cincinnati		Coastal Carolina			
Lindenwood	at Georgia Southern	Marshall		at Army			
