= Dwight Watson (American football) =

American football player and coach (1871–1920)

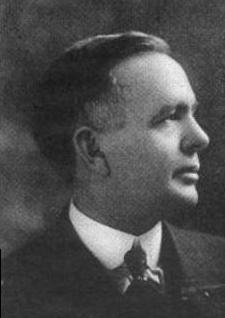

Biographical details
- Born: May 29, 1871, U.S. Geneva Township, Van Buren County, Michigan
- Died: December 28, 1920 (aged 47); South Haven, Michigan, U.S.

Playing career
- 1899: Michigan State Normal

Coaching career (HC unless noted)
- 1899: Michigan State Normal

Head coaching record
- Overall: 1–1–1

Dwight Grant Watson (May 29, 1871 – December 28, 1920) was an American college football player and coach. He was the head football coach at Michigan State Normal College (now known as Eastern Michigan University) during the 1899 college football season. He was also involved in the telephone industry in its early years, serving as manager of the Michigan Telephone Company in Kalamazoo, Michigan, and as the general manager of the Van Buren County Telephone Company in the years prior to his death.

== Early years ==
Watson was born in 1871 in Geneva Township, Van Buren County, Michigan. His father, Jerome Watson, was a farmer. At the time of the 1880 U.S. Census, he was the seventh of nine children ranging from age 1 to age 26. He became a school teacher, and as of 1894, he was teaching elementary school in Lacota, Michigan.

== Coaching career ==
In the late 1890s, Watson enrolled at Michigan State Normal College—now known as Eastern Michigan University—in Ypsilanti, Michigan. During the 1899 college football season, he was a player and head coach for the Michigan State Normal Normalites football team. He was a third-year student at the college during his tenure as the football coach. His coaching record at the school was 1–1–1.

== Head coaching record ==
Year	Team	Overall	Conference	Standing	Bowl/playoffs
Michigan State Normal Normalites (Michigan Intercollegiate Athletic Association) (1899)
1899	Michigan State Normal	1–1–1	0–1		
Michigan State Normal:		1–1–1	0–1		
Total:		1–1–1			

== Military service ==
Watson served with the 31st Michigan Volunteers Company G in 1898 during the Spanish–American War. He was under the command of former Michigan Normal head football coach and future Governor of Michigan Fred W. Green.

== Later years ==
After completing his education at Michigan State Normal College, Watson became employed with Swift & Company in Chicago starting in 1902. In approximately 1903, Watson left his position with Swift & Company and began a long career in the developing telephone industry. He started as a "trouble shooter" for the Kibbie Telephone Company in Crawford County, Illinois. He subsequently accepted a position with the Van Buren County Telephone Company, where he was promoted to district manager in Paw Paw, Michigan. At the time of the 1910 U.S. Census, Watson was living in Paw Paw, working as a manager for the phone company. He was married to Pearl A. Watson, and they had one son, F. Stanley Watson, and three daughters, Katherine, Barbara and Virginia.

In December 1916, after five years in Paw Paw, Watson became the manager of the Michigan State Telephone Company at Kalamazoo, Michigan. In 1918, Watson returned to the Van Buren County Telephone Company as its general manager. At the time of the 1920 U.S. Census, Watson was living in South Haven, Michigan, where he was still working as a manager for the phone company. By 1920, his family had grown to six children with two additional daughters, Elizabeth and Marion.

Watson died in 1920, at age 47, at his home in South Haven following an illness that had lasted for several months.
