= Dwight Wilson (American football) =

American football player and coach (1887–1950)

Biographical details
- Born: April 14, 1887; Dwight, Illinois, U.S.
- Died: September 8, 1950 (aged 63); Lansing, Michigan, U.S.
- Education: University of Michigan; Eastern Michigan University

Playing career
- 1905–1906: Michigan State Normal

Coaching career (HC unless noted)
- 1911: Michigan State Normal

Head coaching record
- Overall: 3–4

Dwight Livingston Wilson (April 14, 1887 – September 8, 1950) was an American college football coach. He was the head football coach at Michigan State Normal College—now known as Eastern Michigan University—in Ypsilanti, Michigan for one season, in 1911, compiling a record of 3–4.

Wilson died in 1950.

== Head coaching record ==
=== Football ===
| Year | Team | Overall | Conference | Standing | Bowl/playoffs |
|---|---|---|---|---|---|
Michigan State Normal Normalites (Michigan Intercollegiate Athletic Association) (1911)
| 1911 | Michigan State Normal | 3–4 | 0–2 | | |
| Michigan State Normal: | | 3–4 | 0–2 | | |
| Total: | | 3–4 | | | |
