= Leroy Brown (coach) =

American football and basketball coach

Biographical details
- Born: July 17, 1887; Clarkston, Michigan, U.S.

Playing career

Football
- 1905–1907: Michigan State Normal

Coaching career (HC unless noted)

Football
- 1912–1913: Michigan State Normal

Basketball
- 1912–1914: Michigan State Normal

Head coaching record
- Overall: 6–5–2 (football); 13–6 (basketball)

Leroy N. Brown (July 17, 1887 – ?) was an American football and basketball coach. He was the head football coach at Michigan State Normal College—now known as Eastern Michigan University—in Ypsilanti, Michigan from 1912 to 1913, compiling a record of 6–5–2. He was also the head basketball coach at Michigan State Normal from 1912 to 1914, tallying a mark of 13–6.

Brown lived in Ann Arbor, Michigan. In 1914, he married Alice Steppans.

== Head coaching record ==
=== Football ===
Year	Team	Overall	Conference	Standing	Bowl/playoffs
Michigan State Normal Normalites (Michigan Intercollegiate Athletic Association) (1912–1913)
1912	Michigan State Normal	4–2–1	0–1		
1913	Michigan State Normal	2–3–1	1–1		
Michigan State Normal:		6–5–2	1–2		
Total:		6–5–2			

=== Basketball ===
Record table
Season	Team	Overall	Conference	Standing	Postseason
Michigan State Normal Normalites (Michigan Intercollegiate Athletic Association) (1912–1914)
1912–13	Michigan State Normal	5–2			
1913–14	Michigan State Normal	8–4			
Michigan State Normal:		13–6			
Total:		13–6			
