= Verne S. Bennett =

American football coach (1867–1944)

Vernon S. Bennett
Biographical details
- Born: January 1, 1867; Prattsburgh, New York, U.S.
- Died: October 26, 1944 (aged 77); New Orleans, Louisiana, U.S.

Coaching career (HC unless noted)
- 1894: Michigan State Normal

Head coaching record
- Overall: 5–2

Vernon S. Bennett (January 1, 1867 – October 26, 1944) was an American college football coach. He served as the head football at Michigan State Normal School—now known as Eastern Michigan University—one season, in 1894, and compiling a record of 5–2.

== Early years ==
Bennett was born in Prattsburgh, New York to "Mr. and Mrs. E.N. Bennett". At the birth of his younger brother Clare in 1871, the family resided in Lapeer, Michigan. He enrolled at Michigan State Normal School in 1891, and while in school he served as president of the Normal Athletic Association, and as editor of the Atheneum Society. In 1892, he served as an enrolling and engrossing clerk for the Michigan House of Representatives. As a senior, he gave a commencement oration on international law, which is recorded as being "especially fine."

== Coaching career ==
Bennett was the fourth head football coach at Michigan State Normal School—now known as Eastern Michigan University—in Ypsilanti, Michigan, serving for one season, in 1894, and compiling a record of 5–2.

== Later life ==
Following his time as the football coach, Bennett resided in Fenton, Michigan with his family, and later in New Orleans. He died there in 1944.

== Head coaching record ==
Year	Team	Overall	Conference	Standing	Bowl/playoffs
Michigan State Normal Normalites (Michigan Intercollegiate Athletic Association) (1894)
1894	Michigan State Normal	5–2	0–1	4th	
Michigan State Normal:		5–2	0–1		
Total:		5–2			
