= Daniel H. Lawrence =

American football coach

Coaching career (HC unless noted)
- 1904–1905: Michigan State Normal

Head coaching record
- Overall: 10–6

Daniel H. Lawrence was an American college football coach. He was the head football coach at Michigan State Normal College—now known as Eastern Michigan University—in Ypsilanti, Michigan from 1904 to 1905, compiling a record of 10–6.

== Head coaching record ==
Year	Team	Overall	Conference	Standing	Bowl/playoffs
Michigan State Normal Normalites (Michigan Intercollegiate Athletic Association) (1904–1905)
1904	Michigan State Normal	6–2	1–1		
1905	Michigan State Normal	4–4	0–2		
Michigan State Normal:		10–6	1–3		
Total:		10–6			
