= Clare Hunter (coach) =

American football coach (1886–1940)

Biographical details
- Born: December 1, 1886; Ypsilanti, Michigan, U.S.
- Died: April 8, 1940 (aged 53); Boise, Idaho, U.S.

Coaching career (HC unless noted)

Football
- 1909: Michigan State Normal

Football
- 1909–1911: Michigan State Normal

Head coaching record
- Overall: 2–4 (football)

Clare Samuel Hunter (December 1, 1886 – April 8, 1940) was an American football and basketball coach. He was the football coach at Michigan State Normal College (now known as Eastern Michigan University) for one season in 1909, compiling a record of 2–4. Hunter was also the head basketball coach at Michigan State Normal from 1909 to 1911.

Hunter was an alumnus of the University of Michigan as well as Michigan State Normal. During his time at Eastern Michigan, he resided at 119 North Adams Street at Ypsilanti. He later resided in Boise, Idaho, where he died in 1940.

== Head coaching record ==
| Year | Team | Overall | Conference | Standing | Bowl/playoffs |
|---|---|---|---|---|---|
Michigan State Normal Normalites (Michigan Intercollegiate Athletic Association) (1909)
| 1909 | Michigan State Normal | 2–4 | 1–2 | | |
| Michigan State Normal: | | 2–4 | 1–2 | | |
| Total: | | 2–4 | | | |
