= Thomas Ransom (coach) =

American football and basketball coach (1870–1946)

Biographical details
- Born: August 8, 1871; Grant County, Indiana, U.S.
- Died: June 3, 1946 (aged 75); Glendale, California, U.S.

Coaching career (HC unless noted)

Football
- 1914: Michigan State Normal

Basketball
- 1914–1915: Michigan State Normal

Head coaching record
- Overall: 3–2–1 (football); 9–4 (basketball)

Thomas Harvey Ransom (August 8, 1871 – June 3, 1946) was an American football and basketball coach and a doctor.

== Career ==
Ransom was the head football coach at Michigan State Normal College—now known as Eastern Michigan University—in Ypsilanti, Michigan, serving for the 1914 season, and compiling a record of 3–2–1. He was also the head basketball coach at Michigan State Normal for the 1914–15 season, tallying a mark of 9–4.

Ransom, who had an M.D., resided at 950 Sheridan Street in Ypsilanti when he worked at the university. He had previously resided at Bloomingdale, where he was one of the first citizens to own a car. In addition to having the position as instructor in Physical Education, Ransom was also a health inspector at the school.

== Personal life ==
Born in Grant County, Indiana in 1871, Ransom married Nelle Pearl Wiggins on April 2, 1902. He died on June 3, 1946, in California.

== Head coaching record ==
=== Football ===
Year	Team	Overall	Conference	Standing	Bowl/playoffs
Michigan State Normal Normalites (Michigan Intercollegiate Athletic Association) (1914)
1914	Michigan State Normal	3–2–1	1–0–1		
Michigan State Normal:		3–2–1	1–0–1		
Total:		3–2–1			

=== Basketball ===
Record table
Season	Team	Overall	Conference	Standing	Postseason
Michigan State Normal Normalites (Michigan Intercollegiate Athletic Association) (1914–1915)
1914–15	Michigan State Normal	9–4			
Michigan State Normal:		9–4			
Total:		9–4			
