= List of Northwest Ohio League football standings =

The Northwest Ohio League first sponsored football in 1921. This is a list of its annual standings since establishment.

== Northwest Ohio League standings ==
1921 Northwest Ohio League football standings
	Conf.					Overall
Team	W		L		T	W		L		T
Bowling Green $	3	–	0	–	0	3	–	1	–	1
Toledo			–			3	–	5	–	0
Findlay	0	–	3	–	0	0	–	3	–	0
$ – Conference champion

1922 Northwest Ohio League football standings
	Conf.					Overall
Team	W		L		T	W		L		T
Bowling Green $	2	–	0	–	1	4	–	2	–	1
Toledo			–			2	–	2	–	3
$ – Conference champion

1923 Northwest Ohio League football standings
	Conf.					Overall
Team	W		L		T	W		L		T
Toledo $	3	–	0	–	0	6	–	4	–	0
Bowling Green	2	–	2	–	0	3	–	5	–	0
$ – Conference champion

1924 Northwest Ohio League football standings
	Conf.					Overall
Team	W		L		T	W		L		T
Toledo			–			5	–	3	–	0
Bowling Green	2	–	2	–	0	3	–	4	–	0
$ – Conference champion

1925 Northwest Ohio League football standings
	Conf.					Overall
Team	W		L		T	W		L		T
Bowling Green	2	–	0	–	1	3	–	1	–	3
Toledo	1	–	0	–	0	1	–	8	–	0
Findlay	2	–	1	–	1	5	–	2	–	2
Bluffton	1	–	2	–	0	1	–	3	–	0
Defiance	0	–	3	–	0	0	–	6	–	2
$ – Conference champion

1926 Northwest Ohio League football standings
	Conf.					Overall
Team	W		L		T	W		L		T
Findlay $	3	–	1	–	0	5	–	5	–	1
Bowling Green	2	–	1	–	0	4	–	3	–	1
Bluffton	2	–	2	–	0	3	–	3	–	0
Toledo	1	–	2	–	0	3	–	5	–	0
Defiance	1	–	3	–	0	3	–	6	–	0
$ – Conference champion

1927 Northwest Ohio League football standings
	Conf.					Overall
Team	W		L		T	W		L		T
Toledo $	3	–	0	–	0	5	–	2	–	0
Bowling Green	2	–	1	–	0	5	–	1	–	1
Bluffton	2	–	2	–	0	4	–	2	–	0
Defiance	2	–	2	–	0	5	–	3	–	0
Findlay	0	–	4	–	0	0	–	9	–	0
$ – Conference champion

1928 Northwest Ohio League football standings
	Conf.					Overall
Team	W		L		T	W		L		T
Bowling Green $	3	–	0	–	1	5	–	0	–	2
Defiance	2	–	1	–	1	3	–	3	–	2
Bluffton	2	–	2	–	0	3	–	2	–	1
Findlay	1	–	3	–	0	2	–	6	–	0
Toledo	1	–	3	–	0	1	–	6	–	0
$ – Conference champion

1929 Northwest Ohio League football standings
	Conf.					Overall
Team	W		L		T	W		L		T
Bowling Green +	3	–	0	–	1	4	–	2	–	1
Toledo +	3	–	0	–	1	4	–	2	–	1
Defiance	2	–	2	–	0	3	–	4	–	1
Findlay	1	–	3	–	0	3	–	5	–	0
Bluffton	0	–	4	–	0	0	–	6	–	1
+ – Conference co-champions

1930 Northwest Ohio League football standings
	Conf.					Overall
Team	W		L		T	W		L		T
Findlay $	3	–	0	–	1	4	–	2	–	1
Bowling Green	2	–	0	–	2	6	–	0	–	2
Defiance	2	–	2	–	0	3	–	4	–	0
Toledo	1	–	2	–	1	2	–	5	–	1
Bluffton	0	–	4	–	0	0	–	7	–	0
$ – Conference champion

1931 Northwest Ohio League football standings
	Conf.					Overall
Team	W		L		T	W		L		T
Defiance $	2	–	0	–	1	6	–	0	–	1
Bluffton	1	–	0	–	2	2	–	2	–	3
Bowling Green	0	–	1	–	2	3	–	1	–	4
Findlay	0	–	2	–	1	3	–	3	–	1
$ – Conference champion

1932 Northwest Ohio League football standings
	Conf.					Overall
Team	W		L		T	W		L		T
Bluffton $	2	–	0	–	1	3	–	2	–	2
Defiance	2	–	1	–	0	3	–	5	–	0
Findlay	1	–	1	–	1	3	–	2	–	2
Wilmington (OH)	0	–	3	–	0	2	–	6	–	0
$ – Conference champion
