= List of Bowling Green Falcons football seasons =

The following is a list of Bowling Green Falcons football seasons for the football team that has represented Bowling Green State University in NCAA competition.

== Seasons ==
Year	Coach	Overall	Conference	Standing	Bowl/playoffs	Coaches^{#}	AP^{°}
John Stitt (Independent) (1919)
1919	John Stitt	0–3					
John Stitt:		0–3					
Walter Jean (Independent) (1920)
1920	Walter Jean	1–4					
Walter Jean:		1–4					
Earl Krieger (Northwest Ohio League) (1921)
1921	Earl Krieger	3–1–1	3–0	1st			
Earl Krieger:		3–1–1	3–0				
Allen Snyder (Northwest Ohio League) (1922)
1922	Allen Snyder	4–2–1	2–0–1	1st			
Allen Snyder:		4–2–1	2–0–1				
Ray B. McCandless (Northwest Ohio League) (1923)
1923	Ray B. McCandless	3–5	2–2				
Ray B. McCandless:		3–5	2–2				
Warren Steller (Northwest Ohio League) (1924–1931)
1924	Warren Steller	3–4	2–2				
1925	Warren Steller	3–1–3	2–0–1	1st			
1926	Warren Steller	4–3–1	2–1	2nd			
1927	Warren Steller	5–1–1	2–1	2nd			
1928	Warren Steller	5–0–2	3–0–1	1st			
1929	Warren Steller	4–2–1	3–0–1	T–1st			
1930	Warren Steller	6–0–2	2–0–2	2nd			
1931	Warren Steller	3–1–4	0–1–2	3rd			
Warren Steller (Independent) (1932)
1932	Warren Steller	3–3–1					
Warren Steller (Ohio Athletic Conference) (1933–1934)
1933	Warren Steller	2–3–2	1–3–2	16th			
1934	Warren Steller	2–3–2	2–3–2	T–12th			
Warren Steller:		40–21–19	19–11–11				
Harry Ockerman (Ohio Athletic Conference) (1935–1940)
1935	Harry Ockerman	1–6	0–6	T–19th			
1936	Harry Ockerman	4–2–3	2–1–3	T–10th			
1937	Harry Ockerman	3–4–1	2–3–1	12th			
1938	Harry Ockerman	3–2–3	2–2–2	T–10th			
1939	Harry Ockerman	6–1–1	3–1–1	7th			
1940	Harry Ockerman	3–4–1	2–2–1	T–9th			
Harry Ockerman:		20–19–9	11–15–8				
Robert Whittaker (Ohio Athletic Conference) (1941)
1941	Robert Whittaker	7–1–1	4–0–1	4th			
Robert Whittaker (Independent) (1942–1951)
1942	Robert Whittaker	6–2–1					
1943	Robert Whittaker	5–3–1					
1944	Robert Whittaker	5–3					
1945	Robert Whittaker	4–3					
1946	Robert Whittaker	5–3					
1947	Robert Whittaker	5–5					
1948	Robert Whittaker	8–0–1					
1949	Robert Whittaker	4–5					
1950	Robert Whittaker	3–4–2					
1951	Robert Whittaker	4–4–1					
Robert Whittaker (Mid-American Conference) (1952–1954)
1952	Robert Whittaker	7–2	2–2	T–4th			
1953	Robert Whittaker	1–8	0–4	7th			
1954	Robert Whittaker	2–7	0–6	8th			
Robert Whittaker:		66–50–7	6–12–1				
Doyt Perry (Mid-American Conference) (1955–1964)
1955	Doyt Perry	7–1–1	4–1–1	2nd			
1956	Doyt Perry	8–0–1	5–0–1	1st			
1957	Doyt Perry	6–1–2	3–1–2	2nd			
1958	Doyt Perry	7–2	4–2	3rd		14 (Note: Rankings from UPI small college poll)	
1959 (Note: UPI small college national champion)	Doyt Perry	9–0	6–0	1st		1 (Note: Rankings from UPI small college poll)	
1960	Doyt Perry	8–1	5–1	2nd		2 (Note: Rankings from UPI coaches small college poll)	6 (Note: Rankings from AP small college poll)
1961	Doyt Perry	8–2	5–1	1st	L Mercy Bowl		
1962	Doyt Perry	7–1–1	5–0–1	1st			
1963	Doyt Perry	8–2	4–2	3rd			
1964	Doyt Perry	9–1	5–1	1st			
Doyt Perry:		77–11–5	46–8–5				
Bob Gibson (Mid-American Conference) (1965–1967)
1965	Bob Gibson	7–2	5–1	T–1st			
1966	Bob Gibson	6–3	4–2	3rd			
1967	Bob Gibson	6–4	2–4	T–5th			
Bob Gibson:		19–9	11–7				
Don Nehlen (Mid-American Conference) (1968–1976)
1968	Don Nehlen	6–3–1	3–2–1	T–3rd			
1969	Don Nehlen	6–4	4–2	2nd			
1970	Don Nehlen	2–6–1	1–3	T–5th			
1971	Don Nehlen	6–4	4–1	2nd			
1972	Don Nehlen	6–3–1	3–1–1	2nd			
1973	Don Nehlen	7–3	2–3	T–3rd			
1974	Don Nehlen	6–4–1	2–3	T–4th			
1975	Don Nehlen	8–3	4–2	T–3rd			
1976	Don Nehlen	6–5	4–3	T–5th			
Don Nehlen:		53–35–4	27–21–2				
Denny Stolz (Mid-American Conference) (1977–1985)
1977	Denny Stolz	5–7	4–3	T–5th			
1978	Denny Stolz	4–7	3–5	T–5th			
1979	Denny Stolz	4–7	3–5	8th			
1980	Denny Stolz	4–7	4–4	7th			
1981	Denny Stolz	5–5–1	5–3–1	4th			
1982	Denny Stolz	7–5	7–2	1st	L California		
1983	Denny Stolz	8–3	7–2	T–2nd			
1984	Denny Stolz	8–3	7–2	2nd			
1985	Denny Stolz	11–1	9–0	1st	L California		
Denny Stolz:		56–45–1	49–26–1				
Moe Ankney (Mid-American Conference) (1986–1990)
1986	Moe Ankney	5–6	5–3	T–2nd			
1987	Moe Ankney	5–6	5–3	T–2nd			
1988	Moe Ankney	2–8–1	1–6–1	8th			
1989	Moe Ankney	5–6	5–3	5th			
1990	Moe Ankney	3–5–2	2–4–2	6th			
Moe Ankney:		20–31–3	18–19–3				
Gary Blackney (Mid-American Conference) (1991–2000)
1991	Gary Blackney	11–1	8–0	1st	W California		
1992	Gary Blackney	10–2	8–0	1st	W Las Vegas		
1993	Gary Blackney	6–3–2	5–1–2	3rd			
1994	Gary Blackney	9–2	7–1	2nd			
1995	Gary Blackney	5–6	3–5	6th			
1996	Gary Blackney	4–7	4–4	5th			
1997	Gary Blackney	3–8	3–5	T–4th (East)			
1998	Gary Blackney	5–6	5–3	T–3rd (East)			
1999	Gary Blackney	5–6	3–5	5th (East)			
2000	Gary Blackney	2–9	2–6	T–5th (East)			
Gary Blackney:		60–50–2	48–30–2				
Urban Meyer (Mid-American Conference) (2001–2002)
2001	Urban Meyer	8–3	5–3	T–3rd (East)			
2002	Urban Meyer	9–3	6–2	3rd (West)			
Urban Meyer:		17–6	11–5				
Gregg Brandon (Mid-American Conference) (2003–2008)
2003	Gregg Brandon	11–3	7–2	1st (West)	W Motor City	23	23
2004	Gregg Brandon	9–3	6–2	3rd (West)	W GMAC		
2005	Gregg Brandon	6–5	5–3	2nd (East)			
2006	Gregg Brandon	4–8	3–5	4th (East)			
2007	Gregg Brandon	8–5	6–2	T–1st (East)	L GMAC		
2008	Gregg Brandon	6–6	4–4	T–2nd (East)			
Gregg Brandon:		44–30	33–20				
Dave Clawson (Mid-American Conference) (2009–2013)
2009	Dave Clawson	7–6	6–2	3rd (East)	L Humanitarian		
2010	Dave Clawson	2–10	1–7	T–5th (East)			
2011	Dave Clawson	5–7	3–5	T–4th (East)			
2012	Dave Clawson	8–5	6–2	2nd (East)	L Military		
2013	Dave Clawson / Adam Scheier	10–3	7–1	1st (East)	L Little Caesars		
Dave Clawson:		32–31	23–17				
Adam Scheier:		0–1					
Dino Babers (Mid-American Conference) (2014–2015)
2014	Dino Babers	8–6	5–3	1st (East)	W Camellia		
2015	Dino Babers / Brian Ward	10–3	7–1	1st (East)	L GoDaddy		
Dino Babers:		18–9	12–4				
Brian Ward:		0–1					
Mike Jinks (Mid-American Conference) (2016–2018)
2016	Mike Jinks	4–8	3–5	T–3rd (East)			
2017	Mike Jinks	2–10	2–6	5th (East)			
2018	Mike Jinks / Carl Pelini	3–9	2–6	T–4th (East)			
Mike Jinks:		7–24	5–14				
Carl Pelini:		2–3	2–3				
Scot Loeffler (Mid-American Conference) (2019–2024)
2019	Scot Loeffler	3–9	2–6	5th (East)			
2020	Scot Loeffler	0–5	0–5	6th (East)			
2021	Scot Loeffler	4–8	2–6	T–4th (East)			
2022	Scot Loeffler	6–7	5–3	T–2nd (East)	L Quick Lane		
2023	Scot Loeffler	7–6	5–3	3rd (East)	L Quick Lane		
2024	Scot Loeffler	7–6	6–2	T–3rd	L 68 Ventures		
Scot Loeffler:		27–41	20–25				
Eddie George (Mid-American Conference) (2025–present)
2025	Eddie George	4–8	2–6	T–11th			
Eddie George:		4–8	2–6				
Total:		574–440–52 (.563)					
National championship Conference title Conference division title or championship game berth
