= List of Toledo Rockets football seasons =

The following is a list of Toledo Rockets football seasons for the football team that has represented University of Toledo in NCAA competition.

== Seasons ==
Year	Coach	Overall	Conference	Standing	Bowl/playoffs	Coaches^{#}	AP^{°}
John Brandeberry (Independent) (1917)
1917	John Brandeberry	0–3					
John Brandeberry:		0–3					
James Baxter (Independent) (1918)
1918	James Baxter	1–1					
James Baxter:		1–1					
Watt Hobt (Independent) (1919–1920)
1919	Watt Hobt	2–4					
1920	Watt Hobt	0–3					
Watt Hobt:		2–7					
Joseph Dwyer (Northwest Ohio League) (1921–1922)
1921	Joseph Dwyer	3–5					
1922	Joseph Dwyer	2–2–3					
Joseph Dwyer:		5–7–3					
Pat Dwyer (Northwest Ohio League) (1923–1925)
1923	Pat Dwyer	6–4	3–0	1st			
1924	Pat Dwyer	5–3					
1925	Pat Dwyer	1–8	1–0				
Pat Dwyer:		12–15	4–0				
Boni Petcoff (Northwest Ohio League) (1926–1929)
1926	Boni Petcoff	3–5	1–2	4th			
1927	Boni Petcoff	5–2	3–0	1st			
1928	Boni Petcoff	1–6	1–3	T–4th			
1929	Boni Petcoff	4–2–1	3–0–1	T–1st			
Boni Petcoff:		13–15–1	8–5–1				
Jim Nicholson (Northwest Ohio League) (1930–1931)
1930	Jim Nicholson	2–5–1	1–2–1	4th			
1931	No team - lack of funding						
Jim Nicholson (Ohio Athletic Conference) (1932–1935)
1932	Jim Nicholson	3–4	3–1	T–4th			
1933	Jim Nicholson	4–2–2	3–2–1	7th			
1934	Jim Nicholson	5–3	4–1	4th			
1935	Jim Nicholson	6–2–1	3–1	3rd			
Jim Nicholson:		20–16–4	14–7–2				
Clarence Spears (Ohio Athletic Conference) (1936–1942)
1936	Clarence Spears	2–6	2–1	T–6th			
1937	Clarence Spears	6–3					
1938	Clarence Spears	6–3–1	0–0–1	T–10th			
1939	Clarence Spears	7–3	1–0	2nd			
1940	Clarence Spears	6–3	1–1	T–9th			
1941	Clarence Spears	7–4	2–0	3rd			
1942	Clarence Spears	4–4–1	1–0–1	4th			
Clarence Spears:		38–26–2	7–2–2				
1943–45	No team - World War II						
Bill Orwig (Ohio Athletic Conference) (1946–1947)
1946	Bill Orwig	6–2–2	4–0	T–2nd	W Glass Bowl		
1947	Bill Orwig	9–2	3–1	T–5th	W Glass Bowl		
Bill Orwig:		15–4–2	7–1				
Skip Stahley (Independent) (1948–1949)
1948	Skip Stahley	5–6			W Glass Bowl		
1949	Skip Stahley	6–4			L Glass Bowl		
Skip Stahley:		11–10					
Bob Snyder (Independent) (1950)
1950	Bob Snyder	4–5					
Bob Snyder:		4–5					
Don Greenwood (Independent) (1951)
1951	Don Greenwood / Claire Dunn	6–4					
Don Greenwood:		4–3					
Claire Dunn (Mid-American Conference) (1952–1953)
1952	Claire Dunn	4–5	1–4	T–6th			
1953	Claire Dunn	3–6	2–3	4th			
Claire Dunn:		9–12	3–7				
Forrest England (Mid-American Conference) (1954–1955)
1954	Forrest England	6–2–1	3–2	4th			
1955	Forrest England	3–5–1	2–4	5th			
Forrest England:		9–7–2	5–6				
Jack Morton (Mid-American Conference) (1956)
1956	Jack Morton	1–7–1	1–5	7th			
Jack Morton:		1–7–1	1–5				
Harry Larche (Mid-American Conference) (1957–1959)
1957	Harry Larche	5–4	3–2	4th			
1958	Harry Larche	4–5	1–4	6th			
1959	Harry Larche	2–6–1	0–6	7th			
Harry Larche:		11–15–1	4–12				
Clive Rush (Mid-American Conference) (1960–1962)
1960	Clive Rush	2–7	0–6	7th			
1961	Clive Rush	3–7	2–4	5th			
1962	Clive Rush	3–6	1–5	6th			
Clive Rush:		8–20	3–15				
Frank Lauterbur (Mid-American Conference) (1963–1970)
1963	Frank Lauterbur	2–7	1–5	T–6th			
1964	Frank Lauterbur	2–8	1–5	7th			
1965	Frank Lauterbur	5–5	2–4	T–5th			
1966	Frank Lauterbur	2–7–1	1–5	T–6th			
1967	Frank Lauterbur	9–1	5–1	T–1st			
1968	Frank Lauterbur	5–4–1	3–2–1	T–3rd			
1969	Frank Lauterbur	11–0	5–0	1st	W Tangerine		
1970	Frank Lauterbur	12–0	5–0	1st	W Tangerine	17	12
Frank Lauterbur:		48–32–2	24–22–1				
Jack Murphy (Mid-American Conference) (1971–1976)
1971	Jack Murphy	12–0	5–0	1st	W Tangerine	13	14
1972	Jack Murphy	6–5	2–3	T–4th			
1973	Jack Murphy	3–8	1–4	T–5th			
1974	Jack Murphy	6–5	3–2	T–2nd			
1975	Jack Murphy	5–6	4–4	T–5th			
1976	Jack Murphy	3–8	2–6	8th			
Jack Murphy:		35–32	17–19				
Chuck Stobart (Mid-American Conference) (1977–1981)
1977	Chuck Stobart	2–9	2–7	9th			
1978	Chuck Stobart	2–9	2–7	9th			
1979	Chuck Stobart	8–2–1	7–1–1	2nd			
1980	Chuck Stobart	4–7	3–6	T–8th			
1981	Chuck Stobart	9–3	8–1	1st	W California		
Chuck Stobart:		25–30–1	22–22–1				
Dan Simrell (Mid-American Conference) (1982–1989)
1982	Dan Simrell	6–5	5–4	T–5th			
1983	Dan Simrell	9–2	7–2	T–2nd			
1984	Dan Simrell	9–2–1	7–1–1	1st	W California		
1985	Dan Simrell	4–7	3–6	T–6th			
1986	Dan Simrell	7–4	5–3	T–2nd			
1987	Dan Simrell	3–7–1	3–4–1	T–6th			
1988	Dan Simrell	6–5	4–4	6th			
1989	Dan Simrell	6–5	6–2	T–2nd			
Dan Simrell:		49–38–2	40–26–2				
Nick Saban (Mid-American Conference) (1990)
1990	Nick Saban	9–2	7–1	T–1st			
Nick Saban:		9–2	7–1				
Gary Pinkel (Mid-American Conference) (1991–2000)
1991	Gary Pinkel	5–5–1	4–3–1	T–3rd			
1992	Gary Pinkel	8–3	5–3	T–3rd			
1993	Gary Pinkel	4–7	3–5	T–7th			
1994	Gary Pinkel	6–4–1	4–3–1	6th			
1995	Gary Pinkel	11–0–1	7–0–1	1st	W Las Vegas	24	24
1996	Gary Pinkel	7–4	6–2	T–2nd			
1997	Gary Pinkel	9–3	7–1	1st (West)			
1998	Gary Pinkel	7–5	6–2	1st (West)			
1999	Gary Pinkel	6–5	5–3	T–2nd (West)			
2000	Gary Pinkel	10–1	6–1	T–1st (West)			
Gary Pinkel:		73–37–3	53–23–3				
Tom Amstutz (Mid-American Conference) (2001–2008)
2001	Tom Amstutz	10–2	5–2	T–1st (West)	W Motor City	22	23
2002	Tom Amstutz	9–5	7–1	T–1st (West)	L Motor City		
2003	Tom Amstutz	8–4	6–2	T–2nd (West)			
2004	Tom Amstutz	9–4	7–1	T–1st (West)	L Motor City		
2005	Tom Amstutz	9–3	6–2	T–1st (West)	W GMAC		
2006	Tom Amstutz	5–7	3–5	5th (West)			
2007	Tom Amstutz	5–7	3–5	5th (West)			
2008	Tom Amstutz	3–9	2–6	5th (West)			
Tom Amstutz:		58–41	39–24				
Tim Beckman (Mid-American Conference) (2009–2011)
2009	Tim Beckman	5–7	3–5	4th (West)			
2010	Tim Beckman	8–5	7–1	2nd (West)	L Little Caesars		
2011	Tim Beckman / Matt Campbell	9–4	7–1	T–1st (West)	W Military		
Tim Beckman:		21–16	17–7				
Matt Campbell (Mid-American Conference) (2011–2015)
2012	Matt Campbell	9–4	6–2	T–2nd (West)	L Famous Idaho Potato		
2013	Matt Campbell	7–5	5–3	T–3rd (West)			
2014	Matt Campbell	9–4	7–1	T–1st (West)	W GoDaddy		
2015	Matt Campbell / Jason Candle	10–2	6–2	T–1st (West)	W Boca Raton	RV	RV
Matt Campbell:		35–15	24–8				
Jason Candle (Mid-American Conference) (2015–2025)
2016	Jason Candle	9–4	6–2	2nd (West)	L Camellia		
2017	Jason Candle	11–3	7–1	1st (West)	L Dollar General		
2018	Jason Candle	7–6	5–3	T–2nd (West)	L Bahamas		
2019	Jason Candle	6–6	3–5	T–5th (West)			
2020	Jason Candle	4–2	4–2	T–2nd (West)			
2021	Jason Candle	7–6	5–3	3rd (West)	L Bahamas		
2022	Jason Candle	9–5	5–3	T–1st (West)	W Boca Raton		
2023	Jason Candle	11–3	8–0	1st (West)	L Arizona		
2024	Jason Candle	8–5	4–4	T–6th	W GameAbove Sports		
2025	Jason Candle	8–5	6–2	T–2nd	L Boca Raton		
Jason Candle:		81–45	53–25				
Total:		597–461–24 (.563)					
National championship Conference title Conference division title or championship game berth
