= List of Toledo Rockets head football coaches =

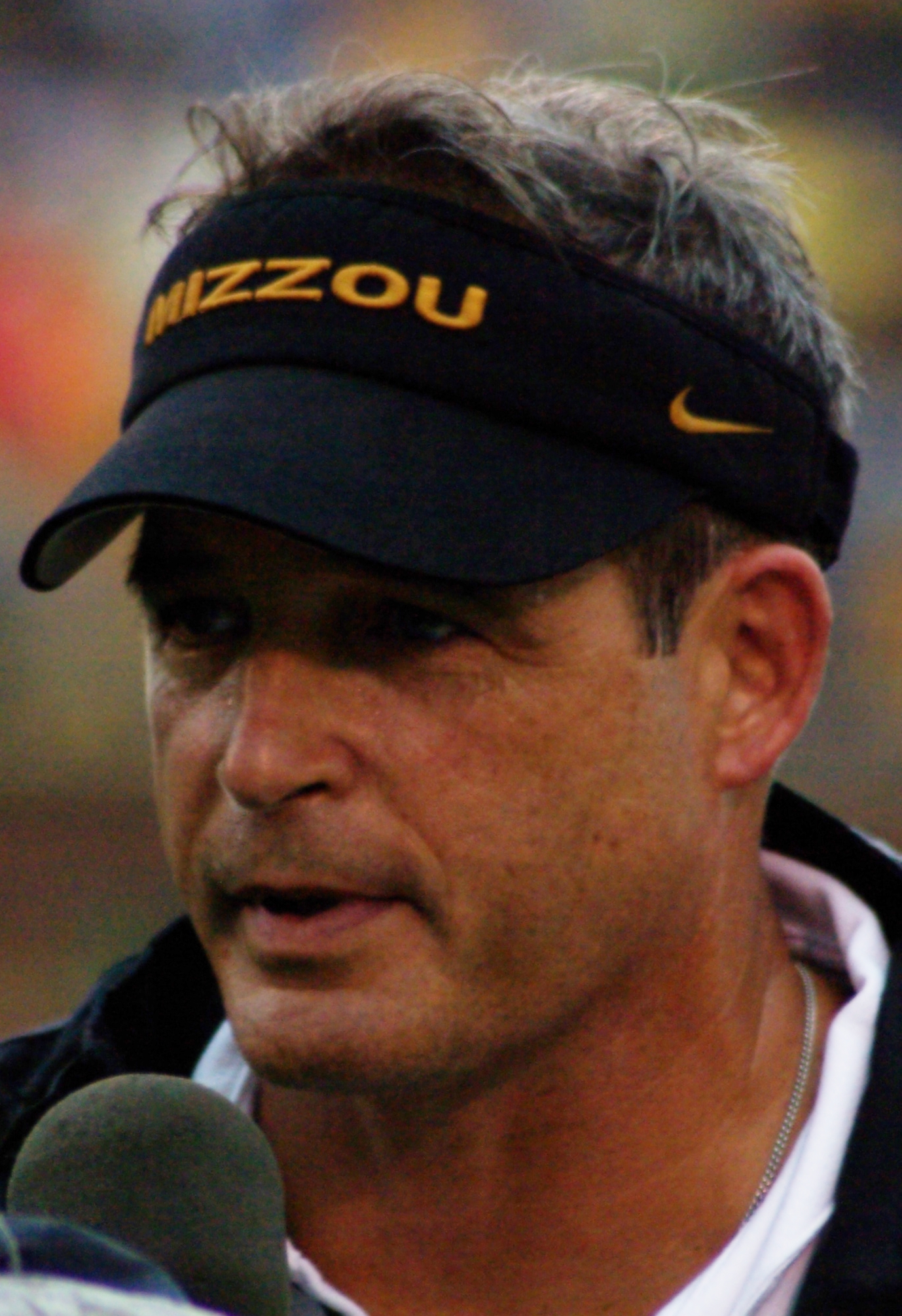
Gary Pinkel has won the 2nd most games as head coach of the Rockets.

The Toledo Rockets college football team represents the University of Toledo in the Mid-American Conference (MAC). The Rockets compete as part of the NCAA Division I Football Bowl Subdivision. The program has had 28 head coaches and one interim head coach since it began play during the 1917 season. Since December 2025, Mike Jacobs has served as head coach at Toledo.

Twelve coaches have led Toledo in postseason bowl games: Bill Orwig, Skip Stahley, Frank Lauterbur, Jack Murphy, Chuck Stobart, Dan Simrell, Gary Pinkel, Tom Amstutz, Tim Beckman, Matt Campbell, Jason Candle, and Robert Weiner. Ten of those coaches also won conference championships: Pat Dwyer captured one and Boni Petcoff two as a member of the Northwest Ohio League; Murphy, Stobart, Simrell, Nick Saban, and Pinkel each captured one; Amstutz and Candle two; and Lauterbur three as a member of the Mid-American Conference.

Pinkel is the leader in seasons coached with 10 years as head coach and games won with 73. Nick Saban has the highest winning percentage at 0.818. John Brandeberry has the lowest winning percentage of those who have coached more than one game, with 0.000. Of the 27 different head coaches who have led the Rockets only Pinkel has been inducted into the College Football Hall of Fame.

== Key ==
Key to symbols in coaches list
General		Overall		Conference		Postseason (Note: Although the first Rose Bowl Game was played in 1902, it has been continuously played since the 1916 game, and is recognized as the oldest bowl game by the NCAA. "—" indicates any season prior to 1916 when postseason games were not played.)	
No.	Order of coaches (Note: A running total of the number of head coaches, with coaches who served separate tenures being counted only once. Interim head coaches are represented with "Int" and are not counted in the running total. "—" indicates the team played but either without a coach or no coach is on record. "X" indicates an interim year without play.)	GC	Games coached	CW	Conference wins	PW	Postseason wins
DC	Division championships	OW	Overall wins	CL	Conference losses	PL	Postseason losses
CC	Conference championships	OL	Overall losses	CT	Conference ties	PT	Postseason ties
NC	National championships	OT	Overall ties (Note: Overtime rules in college football were introduced in 1996, making ties impossible in the period since.)	C%	Conference winning percentage		
†	Elected to the College Football Hall of Fame	O%	Overall winning percentage (Note: When computing the win–loss percentage, a tie counts as half a win and half a loss.)				

== Coaches ==
List of head football coaches showing season(s) coached, overall records, conference records, postseason records, championships and selected awards (Note: Statistics correct as of the end of the 2025 NCAA Division I FBS football season.)
No.	Name	Season(s) (Note: Toledo did not field a team for the 1931 and 1943–1945 seasons.)	GC	OW	OL	OT	O%	CW	CL	CT	C%	PW	PL	PT	CC	NC	Awards
1	John Brandeberry	1917	3	0	3	0	.000	—	—	—	—	—	—	—	—	—	—
2	James Baxter	1918	2	1	1	0	0.500	—	—	—	—	—	—	—	—	—	—
3	Watt Hobt	1919–1920	9	2	7	0	0.222	—	—	—	—	—	—	—	—	—	—
4	Joseph Dwyer	1921–1922	15	5	7	3	0.433	0	0	0	–	—	—	—	0	—	—
5	Pat Dwyer	1923–1925	27	12	15	0	0.444	4	0	0	1.000	—	—	—	1	—	—
6	Boni Petcoff	1926–1929	29	13	15	1	0.466	8	5	1	0.607	—	—	—	2	—	—
7	Jim Nicholson	1930; 1932–1935	40	20	16	4	0.550	14	7	2	0.652	—	—	—	0	—	—
8	Clarence Spears	1936–1942	66	38	26	2	0.591	7	2	2	0.727	—	—	—	0	—	—
9	Bill Orwig	1946–1947	21	15	4	2	0.762	7	1	0	0.875	2	0	0	0	—	—
10	Skip Stahley	1948–1949	21	11	10	0	0.524	—	—	—	—	1	1	0	—	—	—
11	Bob Snyder	1950	9	4	5	0	0.444	—	—	—	—	0	0	0	—	—	—
12	Don Greenwood	1951	7	4	3	0	0.571	—	—	—	—	0	0	0	—	—	—
13	Claire Dunn	1951–1953	21	9	12	0	0.429	3	7	0	0.300	0	0	0	0	—	—
14	Forrest England	1954–1955	18	9	7	2	0.556	5	6	0	0.455	0	0	0	0	—	—
15	Jack Morton	1956	9	1	7	1	0.167	1	5	0	0.167	0	0	0	0	—	—
16	Harry Larche	1957–1959	27	11	15	1	0.426	4	12	0	0.250	0	0	0	0	—	—
17	Clive Rush	1960–1962	28	8	20	0	0.426	3	15	0	0.167	0	0	0	0	—	—
18	Frank Lauterbur	1963–1970	82	48	32	2	0.598	24	22	1	0.521	2	0	0	2	—	—
19	Jack Murphy	1971–1976	67	35	32	0	0.522	17	19	0	0.472	1	0	0	1	—	—
20	Chuck Stobart	1977–1981	56	25	30	1	0.455	22	22	1	0.500	1	0	0	1	—	—
21	Dan Simrell	1982–1989	89	49	38	2	0.562	40	26	2	0.603	0	1	0	1	—	—
22	Nick Saban	1990	11	9	2	0	0.818	7	1	0	0.875	0	0	0	1	—	—
23	Gary Pinkel^{†}	1991–2000	113	73	37	3	0.659	53	23	3	0.690	1	0	0	1	—	—
24	Tom Amstutz	2001–2008	99	58	41	—	0.586	39	24	—	0.619	2	2	—	2	—	—
25	Tim Beckman	2009–2011	37	21	16	—	0.568	17	7	—	0.708	1	0	—	0	—	—
26	Matt Campbell	2011–2015	50	35	15	—	0.700	24	8	—	0.750	2	1	—	0	—	—
27	Jason Candle	2015–2025	125	81	44	—	0.648	53	25	—	0.679	3	5	—	2	—	—
Int	Robert Weiner	2025	1	0	1	—	.000	0	0	—	–	0	1	—	0	—	—
28	Mike Jacobs	2026–present	0	0	0	—	–	0	0	—	–	0	0	—	0	—	—
