= 1930 Toledo Rockets football team =

American college football season

1930 Toledo Rockets football
- Conference: Northwest Ohio League
- Record: 2–5–1 (1–2–1 NOL)
- Head coach: Jim Nicholson (1st season)
- Captain: Don Sharp
- Home stadium: University Stadium (Scott Park)

1930 Northwest Ohio League football standings
	Conf.					Overall
Team	W		L		T	W		L		T
Findlay $	3	–	0	–	1	4	–	2	–	1
Bowling Green	2	–	0	–	2	6	–	0	–	2
Defiance	2	–	2	–	0	3	–	4	–	0
Toledo	1	–	2	–	1	2	–	5	–	1
Bluffton	0	–	4	–	0	0	–	7	–	0
$ – Conference champion

The 1930 Toledo Rockets football team was an American football team that represented Toledo University in the Northwest Ohio League (NOL) during the 1930 college football season. In their first season under head coach Jim Nicholson, the Rockets compiled a 2–5–1 record. Don Sharp was the team captain. The team played its home games at University Stadium (Scott Park) in Toledo, Ohio.

== Schedule ==
Date	Opponent	Site	Result	Source
September 27	at Akron*	Akron, OH	L 0–41	
October 4	at Ohio Northern*	Ada, OH	L 0–6	
October 11	at Defiance	Defiance, OH	L 12–13	
October 17	at Findlay	Findlay, OH	L 6–20	
October 24	Heidelberg*	Toledo, OH	L 0–58	
November 1	at Bowling Green	Bowling Green, OH (rivalry)	T 0–0	
November 8	Bluffton	Toledo, OH	W 14–0	
November 22	at Detroit City College*	Detroit, MI	W 18–0	
*Non-conference game
