= 1928 Toledo Rockets football team =

American college football season

1928 Toledo Rockets football
- Conference: Northwest Ohio League
- Record: 1–6 (1–3–0 NOL)
- Head coach: Boni Petcoff (3rd season)

1928 Northwest Ohio League football standings
	Conf.					Overall
Team	W		L		T	W		L		T
Bowling Green $	3	–	0	–	1	5	–	0	–	2
Defiance	2	–	1	–	1	3	–	3	–	2
Bluffton	2	–	2	–	0	3	–	2	–	1
Findlay	1	–	3	–	0	2	–	6	–	0
Toledo	1	–	3	–	0	1	–	6	–	0
$ – Conference champion

The 1928 Toledo Rockets football team was an American football team that represented Toledo University (renamed the University of Toledo in 1967) in the Northwest Ohio League (NOL) during the 1928 college football season. In their third season under head coach Boni Petcoff, the Rockets compiled a 1–6 overall record and 1–3 in conference.

== Schedule ==
Date	Opponent	Site	Result	Attendance	Source
October 5	Findlay	Toledo, OH	W 31–9		
October 13	Central State (MI)*	Toledo, OH	L 0–13		
October 19	at Bowling Green	Bowling Green, OH (rivalry)	L 0–14	1,200	
October 27	at Defiance	Defiance, OH	L 0–15		
November 3	at Detroit City College*	Detroit, MI	L 6–13		
November 9	Bluffton	Toledo, OH	L 9–33		
November 17	Michigan "B"*	Toledo, OH	L 0–33		
*Non-conference game
