= 1921 Toledo Blue and Gold football team =

American college football season

1921 Toledo Blue and Gold football
- Conference: Northwest Ohio League
- Record: 3–5 (?–? NOL)
- Head coach: Joseph Dwyer (1st season)

1921 Northwest Ohio League football standings
	Conf.					Overall
Team	W		L		T	W		L		T
Bowling Green $	3	–	0	–	0	3	–	1	–	1
Toledo			–			3	–	5	–	0
Findlay	0	–	3	–	0	0	–	3	–	0
$ – Conference champion

The 1921 Toledo Blue and Gold football team was an American football team that represented Toledo University (renamed the University of Toledo in 1967) during the 1921 college football season. This was the team's first season in the Northwest Ohio League. Led by second-year coach Joseph Dwyer, Toledo compiled a 3–5 record.

== Schedule ==
Date	Opponent	Site	Result
September 24	at Cincinnati*	Carson Field; Cincinnati, OH	L 0-20
October 8	at Findlay*	Findlay, OH	W 46-0
October 15	Defiance*	Toledo, OH	W 40-0
October 22	at Adrian*	Adrian, MI	L 0-1 Forfeit
October 29	Bowling Green	Toledo, OH (rivalry)	L 7-20
November 5	Baldwin Wallace*	Toledo, OH	W 1-0 Forfeit
November 11	at Bluffton*	Bluffton, OH	L 0-14
November 19	Detroit Junior College*	Toledo, OH	L 0-13
*Non-conference game
