= 1923 Bowling Green Normals football team =

American college football season

1923 Bowling Green Normals football
- Conference: Northwest Ohio League
- Record: 3–5 (2–2 NOL)
- Head coach: Ray B. McCandless (1st season)
- Captain: Robert A. Younkin
- Home stadium: College Field

1923 Northwest Ohio League football standings
	Conf.					Overall
Team	W		L		T	W		L		T
Toledo $	3	–	0	–	0	6	–	4	–	0
Bowling Green	2	–	2	–	0	3	–	5	–	0
$ – Conference champion

The 1923 Bowling Green Normals football team was an American football team that represented Bowling Green State Normal School (later Bowling Green State University) as a member of the Northwest Ohio League (NOL) during the 1923 college football season. In its first and only season under head coach Ray B. McCandless, the team compiled a 3–5 record and was outscored by a total of 131 to 68. Robert A. Younkin was the team captain.

== Schedule ==
Date	Opponent	Site	Result	Source
September 29	Ohio Northern*	Bowling Green, OH	L 0–46	
October 6	at Heidelberg*	Tiffin, OH	L 12–13	
October 13	Bluffton	Bowling Green, OH	W 13–0	
October 19	Findlay	Bowling Green, OH	W 26–3	
October 27	at Toledo	Toledo, OH (rivalry)	L 0–27	
November 3	at Defiance	Defiance, OH	L 7–17	
November 10	Ashland*^{†}	College Field; Bowling Green, OH	W 10–0	
November 24	at Baldwin–Wallace*	Berea, OH	L 0–25	
*Non-conference game; ^{†}Homecoming
