= 1926 Toledo Rockets football team =

American college football season

1926 Toledo Rockets football
- Conference: Northwest Ohio League
- Record: 3–5 (1–2 NOL)
- Head coach: Boni Petcoff (1st season)

1926 Northwest Ohio League football standings
	Conf.					Overall
Team	W		L		T	W		L		T
Findlay $	3	–	1	–	0	5	–	5	–	1
Bowling Green	2	–	1	–	0	4	–	3	–	1
Bluffton	2	–	2	–	0	3	–	3	–	0
Toledo	1	–	2	–	0	3	–	5	–	0
Defiance	1	–	3	–	0	3	–	6	–	0
$ – Conference champion

The 1926 Toledo Rockets football team was an American football team that represented Toledo University (renamed the University of Toledo in 1967) during the 1926 college football season. Led by first-year coach Boni Petcoff, Toledo compiled a 3–5 overall record and 1–2 in conference play.

== Schedule ==
Date	Opponent	Site	Result	Attendance	Source
October 2	at Alma*	Alma, MI	L 0–19		
October 9	Hillsdale*	Toledo, OH	L 14–26		
October 16	at Defiance	Defiance, OH	L 0–12		
October 23	Bluffton	Toledo, OH	L 7–13		
October 30	Findlay	Toledo, OH	W 7–0		
November 6	at St. Xavier*	Corcoran Field; Cincinnati, OH	L 6–69		
November 13	at Detroit City College*	Grindley Field; Detroit, MI	W 14–7		
November 20	Buffalo*	Toledo, OH	W 33–7		
*Non-conference game
