= 1924 Toledo Rockets football team =

American college football season

1924 Toledo Rockets football
- Conference: Northwest Ohio League
- Record: 5–3 ( NOL)
- Head coach: Pat Dwyer (2nd season)
- Captain: Gilbert Stick

1924 Northwest Ohio League football standings
	Conf.					Overall
Team	W		L		T	W		L		T
Toledo			–			5	–	3	–	0
Bowling Green	2	–	2	–	0	3	–	4	–	0
$ – Conference champion

The 1924 Toledo Rockets football team was an American football team that represented Toledo University (renamed the University of Toledo in 1967) during the 1924 college football season. In their second season under head coach Pat Dwyer, the team compiled a 5–3 record. Gilbert Stick was the team captain.

== Schedule ==
Date	Opponent	Site	Result	Source
October 4	at Michigan State Normal*	Ypsilanti, MI	W 7–0	
October 11	at Carnegie Tech*	Pittsburgh, PA	L 0–54	
October 18	Hillsdale*	Toledo, OH	W 19–0	
October 25	at Bowling Green	Bowling Green, OH (rivalry)	W 12–7	
November 1	Assumption (ON)*	Toledo, OH	W 6–0	
November 8	at Dayton	Dayton, OH	L 6–52	
November 15	at Detroit City College*	Roosevelt Field; Detroit, MI	W 27–0	
November 22	at Akron*	Akron, OH	L 7–14	
*Non-conference game
