= 1922 Toledo Blue and Gold football team =

American college football season

1922 Toledo Blue and Gold football
- Conference: Northwest Ohio League
- Record: 2–2–3 (?–? NOL)
- Head coach: Joseph Dwyer (2nd season)

1922 Northwest Ohio League football standings
	Conf.					Overall
Team	W		L		T	W		L		T
Bowling Green $	2	–	0	–	1	4	–	2	–	1
Toledo			–			2	–	2	–	3
$ – Conference champion

The 1922 Toledo Blue and Gold football team was an American football team that represented Toledo University (renamed the University of Toledo in 1967) during the 1922 college football season. Led by second-year coach Joseph Dwyer, Toledo compiled a 2–2–3 record.

== Schedule ==
Date	Opponent	Site	Result
October 7	at Defiance*	Defiance, OH	L 0-7
October 14	Alma*	Toledo, OH	T 0-0
October 20	Hillsdale*	Toledo, OH	W 6-0
November 4	at Bowling Green	Bowing Green, OH (rivalry)	T 6-6
November 11	Muskingum*	Toledo, OH	W 3-0
November 18	at Detroit Junior College*	Detroit, MI	L 2-6
November 24	Baldwin Wallace*	Toledo, OH	T 0-0
*Non-conference game
