= 1924 Bowling Green Normals football team =

American college football season

1924 Bowling Green Normals football
- Conference: Northwest Ohio League
- Record: 3–4 (2–2 NOL)
- Head coach: Warren Steller (1st season)
- Captain: Ralph Castner

1924 Northwest Ohio League football standings
	Conf.					Overall
Team	W		L		T	W		L		T
Toledo			–			5	–	3	–	0
Bowling Green	2	–	2	–	0	3	–	4	–	0
$ – Conference champion

The 1924 Bowling Green Normals football team was an American football team that represented Bowling Green State Normal School (later Bowling Green State University) as a member of the Northwest Ohio League (NOL) during the 1924 college football season. In its first season under head coach Warren Steller, the team compiled a 3–4 record and was outscored by a total of 73 to 60. Ralph Castner was the team captain.

On October 18, Bowling Green defeated Ashland, 13–6, without making a first down in the game. The team scored by recovering two fumbles and returning them a total of 65 yards for touchdowns. Ashland converted 13 first downs but had five passes intercepted.

The school celebrated its 10th anniversary at the homecoming game on November 8. New bleachers seating over 1,000 persons were dedicated at the school's athletic field.

== Schedule ==
Date	Opponent	Site	Result	Source
October 11	at Capital*	Bexley, OH	L 0–19	
October 18	at Ashland*	Ashland, OH	W 13–6	
October 25	at Toledo	Toledo, OH (rivalry)	L 7–12	
November 1	at Central Michigan*	Mount Pleasant, MI	L 0–21	
November 8	Defiance^{†}	Bowling Green, OH	L 0–15	
November 15	at Bluffton	Bluffton, OH	W 6–0	
November 24	Cedarville	Bowling Green, OH	W 34–0	
*Non-conference game; ^{†}Homecoming
