= 1925 Toledo Rockets football team =

American college football season

1925 Toledo Rockets football
- Conference: Northwest Ohio League
- Record: 1–8 (1–0 NOL)
- Head coach: Pat Dwyer (3rd season)
- Captain: Richard Kazmier

1925 Northwest Ohio League football standings
	Conf.					Overall
Team	W		L		T	W		L		T
Bowling Green	2	–	0	–	1	3	–	1	–	3
Toledo	1	–	0	–	0	1	–	8	–	0
Findlay	2	–	1	–	1	5	–	2	–	2
Bluffton	1	–	2	–	0	1	–	3	–	0
Defiance	0	–	3	–	0	0	–	6	–	2
$ – Conference champion

The 1925 Toledo Rockets football team was an American football team that represented Toledo University (renamed the University of Toledo in 1967) during the 1925 college football season. In their third and final season under head coach Pat Dwyer, the team compiled a 1–5 record. The team failed to score in six of nine game and holds the school record for fewest points scored (3.1 points per game).

Richard Kazmier was the team captain.

== Schedule ==
Date	Opponent	Site	Result	Source
September 26	Western Reserve*	Toledo, OH	L 0–14	
October 3	at Buffalo*	Rotary Field; Buffalo, NY	L 0–2	
October 10	Dayton*	Toledo, OH	L 6–29	
October 17	Ohio*	Toledo, OH	L 0–7	
October 31	at Assumption (ON)*	Windsor, Ontario	L 2–6	
November 7	at Michigan State*	College Field; East Lansing, MI	L 0–58	
November 11	at Findlay	Findlay, OH	W 20–0	
November 14	Detroit City College*	Toledo, OH	L 0–23	
November 21	at Louisville*	Parkway Field; Louisville, KY	L 0–34	
*Non-conference game
