= 1930 Bowling Green Falcons football team =

American college football season

1930 Bowling Green Falcons football
- Conference: Northwest Ohio League
- Record: 6–0–2 (2–0–2 NOL)
- Head coach: Warren Steller (7th season)
- Captain: Chet Chapman

1930 Northwest Ohio League football standings
	Conf.					Overall
Team	W		L		T	W		L		T
Findlay $	3	–	0	–	1	4	–	2	–	1
Bowling Green	2	–	0	–	2	6	–	0	–	2
Defiance	2	–	2	–	0	3	–	4	–	0
Toledo	1	–	2	–	1	2	–	5	–	1
Bluffton	0	–	4	–	0	0	–	7	–	0
$ – Conference champion

The 1930 Bowling Green Falcons football team was an American football team that represented Bowling Green State College (later renamed Bowling Green State University) as a member of the Northwest Ohio League (NOL) during the 1930 college football season. In their seventh season under head coach Warren Steller, the Falcons compiled a 6–0–2 record (2–0–2 against NOL opponents), finished in second place out of five teams in the NOL, and outscored opponents by a total of 107 to 38. Chet Chapman was the team captain.

== Schedule ==
Date	Opponent	Site	Result	Source
September 27	Hope*	Bowling Green, OH	W 19–0	
October 4	at Baldwin–Wallace*	Berea, OH	W 7–6	
October 11	at Bluffton	Bluffton, OH	W 13–6	
October 18	Defiance	Bowling Green, OH	W 13–6	
October 25	at Findlay	Findlay, OH	T 6–6	
November 1	Toledo	Bowling Green, OH (rivalry)	T 0–0	
November 8	Albion*	Bowling Green, OH	W 30–7	
November 15	at Detroit City College*	Detroit, MI	W 19–7	
*Non-conference game
