= 1927 Bowling Green Falcons football team =

American college football season

1927 Bowling Green Falcons football
- Conference: Northwest Ohio League
- Record: 5–1–1 (2–1 NOL)
- Head coach: Warren Steller (4th season)
- Captain: Ora Knecht

1927 Northwest Ohio League football standings
	Conf.					Overall
Team	W		L		T	W		L		T
Toledo $	3	–	0	–	0	5	–	2	–	0
Bowling Green	2	–	1	–	0	5	–	1	–	1
Bluffton	2	–	2	–	0	4	–	2	–	0
Defiance	2	–	2	–	0	5	–	3	–	0
Findlay	0	–	4	–	0	0	–	9	–	0
$ – Conference champion

The 1927 Bowling Green Falcons football team was an American football team that represented Bowling Green State Normal School (later Bowling Green State University) as a member of the Northwest Ohio League (NOL) during the 1927 college football season. In their fourth season under head coach Warren Steller, the Falcons compiled a 5–1–1 record (2–1 against NOL opponents), finished in second place out of five teams in the NOL, and outscored opponents by a total of 52 to 14. Ora Knecht was the team captain.

== Schedule ==
Date	Opponent	Site	Result	Source
September 24	at Otterbein*	Westerville, OH	T 0–0	
October 1	Ohio Northern*	Bowling Green, OH	W 6–2	
October 15	at Kent State*	Kent, OH (rivalry)	W 13–0	
October 22	Detroit City College*	Bowling Green, OH	W 6–0	
October 29	at Findlay	Findlay, OH	W 6–0	
November 11	at Defiance	Defiance, OH	W 15–0	
November 19	Bluffton	Bowling Green, OH	L 6–12	
*Non-conference game
