= 1929 Toledo Rockets football team =

American college football season

1929 Toledo Rockets football

NOL co-champion
- Conference: Northwest Ohio League
- Record: 4–2–1 (3–0–1 NOL)
- Head coach: Boni Petcoff (4th season)

1929 Northwest Ohio League football standings
	Conf.					Overall
Team	W		L		T	W		L		T
Bowling Green +	3	–	0	–	1	4	–	2	–	1
Toledo +	3	–	0	–	1	4	–	2	–	1
Defiance	2	–	2	–	0	3	–	4	–	1
Findlay	1	–	3	–	0	3	–	5	–	0
Bluffton	0	–	4	–	0	0	–	6	–	1
+ – Conference co-champions

The 1929 Toledo Rockets football team was an American football team that represented the Toledo University in the Northwest Ohio League (NOL) during the 1929 college football season. In their fourth season under head coach Boni Petcoff, the Rockets compiled a 4–2–1 overall record, with a 3–0–1 record and conference co-championship in the NOL.

== Schedule ==
Date	Opponent	Site	Result	Attendance	Source
September 28	Akron*	Toledo, OH	L 0–26		
October 12	at Findlay	Findlay, OH	W 7–0		
October 25	Bowling Green	Toledo, OH (rivalry)	T 0–0		
November 2	at Bluffton	Bluffton, OH	W 7–0		
November 9	Detroit City College*	Toledo, OH	W 17–0		
November 16	Central State (MI)*	Tambling Field; Mount Pleasant, MI	L 12–31		
November 23	Defiance	Toledo, OH	W 25–13		
*Non-conference game
