= 1928 Bowling Green Falcons football team =

American college football season

1928 Bowling Green Falcons football

NOL champion
- Conference: Northwest Ohio League
- Record: 5–0–2 (3–0–1 NOL)
- Head coach: Warren Steller (5th season)
- Captain: Harry Gwynn

1928 Northwest Ohio League football standings
| | Conf. | | | | | Overall |
| Team | W | | L | | T | W | | L | | T |
|---|---|---|---|---|---|---|---|---|---|---|
| Bowling Green $ | 3 | – | 0 | – | 1 | 5 | – | 0 | – | 2 |
| Defiance | 2 | – | 1 | – | 1 | 3 | – | 3 | – | 2 |
| Bluffton | 2 | – | 2 | – | 0 | 3 | – | 2 | – | 1 |
| Findlay | 1 | – | 3 | – | 0 | 2 | – | 6 | – | 0 |
| Toledo | 1 | – | 3 | – | 0 | 1 | – | 6 | – | 0 |
$ – Conference champion

The 1928 Bowling Green Falcons football team was an American football team that represented Bowling Green State Normal School (later Bowling Green State University) as a member of the Northwest Ohio League (NOL) during the 1928 college football season. In their fifth season under head coach Warren Steller, the Falcons compiled a 5–0–2 record (3–0–1 against NOL opponents), won the NOL championship, and outscored opponents by a total of 84 to 18. Harry Gwynn was the team captain.

== Schedule ==
| Date | Opponent | Site | Result | Attendance | Source |
|---|---|---|---|---|---|
| September 29 | at Ohio Northern* | Ada, OH | W 7–0 | | |
| October 13 | at Bluffton^{†} | Bluffton, OH | W 6–0 | | |
| October 19 | Toledo | Bowling Green, OH (rivalry) | W 14–0 | 1,200 | |
| November 3 | Defiance | Bowling Green, OH | T 12–12 | | |
| November 10 | at Detroit City College* | Detroit, MI | W 20–0 | | |
| November 17 | Findlay | Bowling Green, OH | W 19–0 | | |
| November 24 | Kent State* | Bowling Green, OH (rivalry) | T 6–6 | | |
*Non-conference game; ^{†}Homecoming
