= Warren Steller =

American athlete and coach (1897–1974)

Biographical details
- Born: October 8, 1897
- Died: August 6, 1974 (aged 76); Bowling Green, Ohio, U.S.

Playing career

Football
- 1917: Oberlin
- 1919: Oberlin

Basketball
- 1917–1918: Oberlin

Baseball
- c. 1918: Oberlin

Coaching career (HC unless noted)

Football
- 1924–1934: Bowling Green

Basketball
- 1922–1923: Wesleyan
- 1924–1925: Bowling Green

Baseball
- 1923: Wesleyan
- 1925: Bowling Green
- 1928–1959: Bowling Green

Administrative career (AD unless noted)
- 1924–1941: Bowling Green

Head coaching record
- Overall: 40–21–19 (football); 18–12 (basketball); 228–164 (baseball)

Accomplishments and honors

Championships
- Football; 3 Northwest Ohio League (1925, 1928–1929)

Warren E. Steller (October 8, 1897 – August 6, 1974) was an American football, basketball, and baseball player and coach. He served as the head football coach at Bowling Green State Normal School—now known as Bowling Green State University—from 1924 to 1934, compiling a record of 40–21–19. Steller was also the head basketball coach at Wesleyan University in 1922–23 and at Bowling Green in 1924–25, tallying a career college basketball mark of 18–12. In addition, he was the head baseball coach at Wesleyan in 1923 and at Bowling Green in 1925 and again from 1928 to 1959, amassing a career college baseball record of 228–164. Steller attended Oberlin College, where he played football, basketball, and baseball, and is considered one of the finest athletes ever to play for the Yeoman. In 1921, the Oberlin football team beat Ohio State, 7–6, the last time an intrastate opponent beat Ohio State. Steller scored the winning touchdown. In 1965, Bowling Green renamed its baseball stadium Warren E. Steller Field in dedication to the former coach.

== Playing career ==
In 1921, Oberlin's football team beat Ohio State, 7–6, at Columbus. The Ohio State team had gone to the Rose Bowl the previous season. That was the last time an intrastate team beat Ohio State. Steller scored the winning touchdown after the team made an 85-yard march down the field in the third quarter, culminating in a short pass across the goal line and a point-after. Ohio State's coach, John Wilce, was so upset by the loss that he made his squad stay on the field after the game for a special practice session.

== Coaching career ==
Steller's 1944 baseball team at Bowling Green was Ohio college champions.

== Head coaching record ==
=== Football ===
Year	Team	Overall	Conference	Standing	Bowl/playoffs
Bowling Green Normals/Falcons (Northwest Ohio League) (1924–1931)
1924	Bowling Green	3–4	2–2		
1925	Bowling Green	3–1–3	2–0–1	1st	
1926	Bowling Green	4–3–1	2–1	2nd	
1927	Bowling Green	5–1–1	2–1	2nd	
1928	Bowling Green	5–0–2	3–0–1	1st	
1929	Bowling Green	4–2–1	3–0–1	T–1st	
1930	Bowling Green	6–0–2	2–0–2	2nd	
1931	Bowling Green	3–1–4	0–1–2	3rd	
Bowling Green Falcons (Independent) (1932)
1932	Bowling Green	3–3–1			
Bowling Green Falcons (Ohio Athletic Conference) (1933–1934)
1933	Bowling Green	2–3–2	1–3–2	18th	
1934	Bowling Green	2–3–2	2–3–2	T–12th	
Bowling Green:		40–21–19	19–11–11		
Total:		40–21–19			
National championship Conference title Conference division title or championship game berth
