= Boni Petcoff =

American football player and coach (1900–1965)

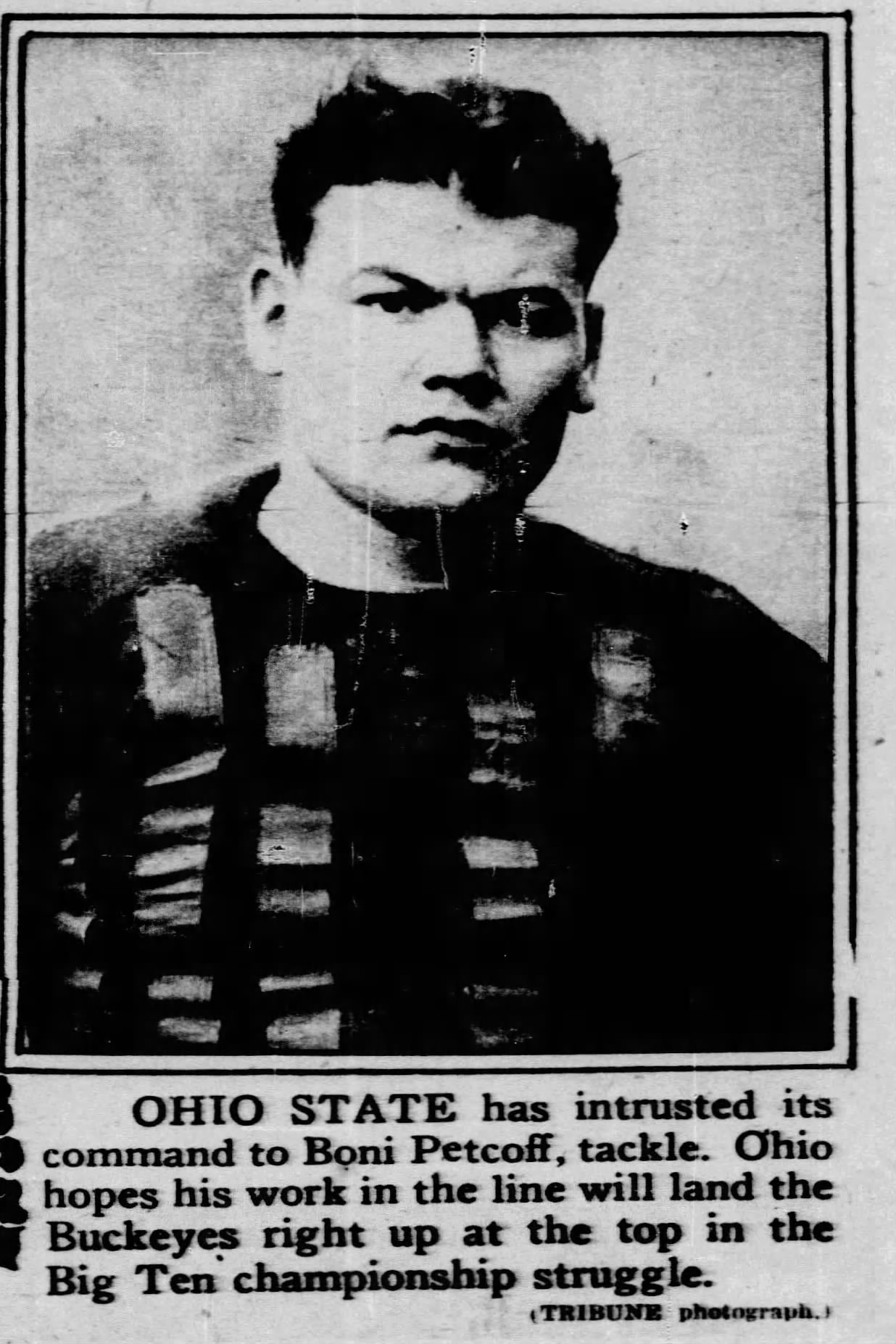
- Petcoff in 1923 as Ohio State football team captain.

Profile
- Position: Tackle

Personal information
- Born: February 1, 1900; Bulgaria
- Died: August 5, 1965 (aged 65); Oregon, Ohio, U.S.
- Listed height: 5 ft 10 in (1.78 m)
- Listed weight: 223 lb (101 kg)

Career information
- High school: Waite (Toledo, Ohio)
- College: Ohio State

Career history

Playing
- Columbus Tigers (1924–1926)

Coaching
- Toledo (1926–1929) (head coach)

Awards and highlights
- All-Pro (1924)

Boni Eli Petcoff (February 1, 1900 – August 5, 1965) was an American football tackle and coach.

== Playing ==
Petcoff was born in Bulgaria and came to the United States at age six. He attended Waite High School in Toledo, Ohio and played football under Larry Bevan for four years. Playing both guard and tackle, Petcoff was a three-time all-city lineman. He was also captain of the school's basketball team his senior year.

Petcoff played college football at Ohio State University and was captain of the 1923 Ohio State Buckeyes football team. He was also a javelin thrower on Ohio State's track team.

He played professionally in the National Football League (NFL) with the Columbus Tigers from 1924 to 1926. He was selected as a first-team tackle on the 1924 All-Pro Team.

== Coaching ==
Petcoff served as the head football coach at the University of Toledo from 1926 to 1929, compiling a record of 13–15–1 and winning two Northwest Ohio League championships.

== Medicine ==
Petcoff graduated from the Ohio State University College of Medicine in 1926. In addition to maintaining a private practice in Toledo, he was also a physician for the Ohio Athletic Commission and the Waite High School football team. In 1942, he was commissioned a captain in the United States Army Medical Corps. He was a regimental surgeon in Iran, then served as a mountain district surgeon with the Persian Gulf Command. He was stationed at Camp Atterbury upon his return to the United States and resumed his practice in Toledo after going on terminal leave in 1946.

== Personal life and death ==
In 1935, Petcoff married Hazel Geiner, the longtime registrar at the University of Toledo.

In 1962, Petcoff was inducted into the Greater Toledo Sports Hall of Fame.

On August 5, 1965, Petcoff collapsed while playing golf at the Heather Downs Country Club and died of a coronary thrombosis en-route to the hospital.

== Head coaching record ==
Year	Team	Overall	Conference	Standing	Bowl/playoffs
Toledo Rockets (Northwest Ohio League) (1926–1929)
1926	Toledo	3–5	1–2	4th	
1927	Toledo	5–2	3–0	1st	
1928	Toledo	1–6	1–3	T–4th	
1929	Toledo	4–2–1	3–0–1	T–1st	
Toledo:		13–15–1	8–5–1		
Total:		13–15–1			
National championship Conference title Conference division title or championship game berth
