= Earl Krieger =

American football and basketball player, coach, official, baseball coach (1896–1960)

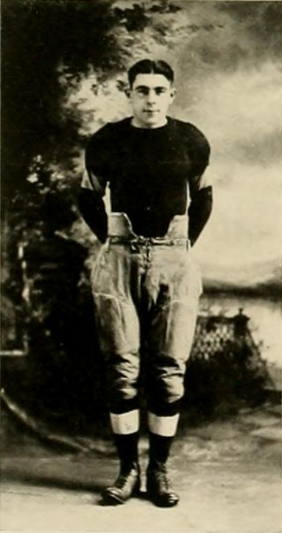
- Krieger pictured in Athena 1920, Ohio yearbook

Biographical details
- Born: August 30, 1896; Columbus, Ohio, U.S.
- Died: November 10, 1960 (aged 64); Bexley, Ohio, U.S.

Playing career

Football
- 1918–1919: Ohio
- 1921: Detroit Tigers
- 1922: Columbus Panhandles

Basketball
- 1919–1920: Ohio
- Positions: End, fullback, halfback (football)

Coaching career (HC unless noted)

Football
- 1920: Tennessee (backfield)
- 1921: Bowling Green

Basketball
- 1921–1922: Bowling Green

Baseball
- 1922: Bowling Green

Head coaching record
- Overall: 3–1–1 (football); 4–10 (basketball); 7–1 (baseball)

Accomplishments and honors

Championships
- Football; 1 NOL (1921)

Earl Carlton "Irish" Krieger (August 30, 1896 – November 10, 1960) was an American football and basketball player, coach of football, basketball, and baseball, and official in football and basketball. He was the third head football coach at Bowling Green State Normal School—now known as Bowling Green State University—serving for one season in 1921 and compiling a record of 3–1–1. Krieger was also the head basketball coach at Bowling Green State Normal during the 1921–22 season, tallying a mark of 4–10, and the school's head baseball coach in the spring of 1922, notching a record of 7–1. Krieger played college football at Ohio University, from which he graduated in 1920. He played professional football in the National Football League (NFL), for the Detroit Tigers in 1921 and the Columbus Panhandles in 1922.

In addition to coaching at Bowling Green, Krieger was also a member of the football coaching staffs at his alma mater and at the University of Tennessee. For 25 years until his retirement in 1953, he worked as a football and basketball official for the Big Ten Conference. He was also a member of the National Collegiate Athletic Association's football rules committee. Krieger died at the age of 64 on November 10, 1960.

== Head coaching record ==
=== Football ===
Year	Team	Overall	Conference	Standing	Bowl/playoffs
Bowling Green Normals (Northwest Ohio League) (1921)
1921	Bowling Green	3–1–1	3–0	1st	
Bowling Green:		3–1–1	3–0		
Total:		3–1–1			
National championship Conference title Conference division title or championship game berth
