= 1926 Bowling Green Normals football team =

American college football season

1926 Bowling Green Normals football
- Conference: Northwest Ohio League
- Record: 4–3–1 (2–1 NOL)
- Head coach: Warren Steller (3rd season)
- Captain: Hayden Olds

1926 Northwest Ohio League football standings
	Conf.					Overall
Team	W		L		T	W		L		T
Findlay $	3	–	1	–	0	5	–	5	–	1
Bowling Green	2	–	1	–	0	4	–	3	–	1
Bluffton	2	–	2	–	0	3	–	3	–	0
Toledo	1	–	2	–	0	3	–	5	–	0
Defiance	1	–	3	–	0	3	–	6	–	0
$ – Conference champion

The 1926 Bowling Green Normals football team was an American football team that represented Bowling Green State Normal School (later Bowling Green State University) as a member of the Northwest Ohio League (NOL) during the 1926 college football season. In their third season under head coach Warren Steller, the Falcons compiled a 4–3–1 record (2–1 against NOL opponents), finished in second place out of five teams in the NOL, and outscored all opponents by a total of 88 to 70. Hayden Olds was the team captain.

== Schedule ==
Date	Opponent	Site	Result	Source
September 25	at Dayton*	University of Dayton Stadium; Dayton, OH	L 0–41	
October 2	at Bluffton	Bluffton, OH	W 14–0	
October 9	Cedarville*	Bowling Green, OH	W 25–0	
October 23	Findlay	Bowling Green, OH	L 6–7	
October 30	Central Michigan*	Bowling Green, OH	W 13–0	
November 6	Defiance^{†}	Bowling Green, OH	W 30–7	
November 11	at Capital*	Bexley, OH	L 0–15	
November 20	at Detroit City College*	Detroit, MI	T 0–0	
*Non-conference game; ^{†}Homecoming
