= Ray B. McCandless =

American football player and sports coach (1889–1931)

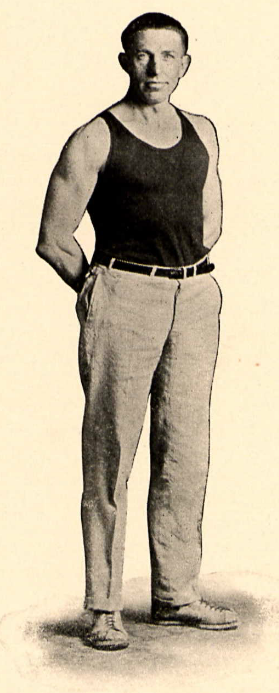
- McCandless pictured in The Key 1924, Bowling Green yearbook

Biographical details
- Born: October 6, 1889; Broken Bow, Nebraska, U.S.
- Died: January 8, 1931 (aged 41); York, Nebraska, U.S.

Playing career

Football
- ?: Nebraska Wesleyan

Coaching career (HC unless noted)

Football
- 1919: Chadron Normal
- 1920–1922: Nebraska Wesleyan
- 1923: Bowling Green
- 1924: Bethany (WV)
- 1928–1930: York

Basketball
- 1920–1923: Nebraska Wesleyan
- 1923–1924: Bowling Green State Normal
- 1924–1925: Bethany (WV)

Baseball
- 1924: Bowling Green

Head coaching record
- Overall: 29–37–10 (football); 60–43 (basketball); 2–2–2 (baseball)

Accomplishments and honors

Championships
- 1 NIC (1921)

Raymond Beebe McCandless (October 6, 1889 – January 8, 1931) was an American football player and coach of football, basketball, and baseball. He served as the head football coach at Chadron State College in 1919, Nebraska Wesleyan University from 1920 to 1922, Bowling Green State Normal School—now known as Bowling Green State University—in 1923, Bethany College in Bethany, West Virginia for the 1924 season, and York College in York, Nebraska from 1928 to 1930, compiling a career college football record of 29–37–10. McCandless was also the head basketball coach at Nebraska Wesleyan from 1920 to 1923, at Bowling Green State Normal during the 1923–24 season, and at Bethany for the 1924–25 season, amassing a career college basketball record of tallying a mark of 60–43. In addition, he was the head baseball coach at Bowling Green State Normal in the spring of 1924, tallying a mark of 2–2–2. McCandless played football at Nebraska Wesleyan. He died on January 8, 1931, in York, Nebraska.

== Early life, education, and military service ==
The fourth son of Lucian McCandless and Amanda Gandy, McCandless was born in Broken Bow, Nebraska. He attended Broken Bow schools and graduated at 16. In 1909 he, attended the University of Nebraska, and in 1910, the Broken Bow Business College. The following year he entered Nebraska Wesleyan University, graduating in 1914 with honors for popularity, scholarship and athletics. He then began his coaching career at Nebraska City.

McCandless volunteered with the Sixth Nebraska Infantry in 1917, and was appointed Second Lieutenant of the 127th Machine Gun Battalion. He saw service in France during World War I with the 29th Infantry Division.

== Head coaching record ==
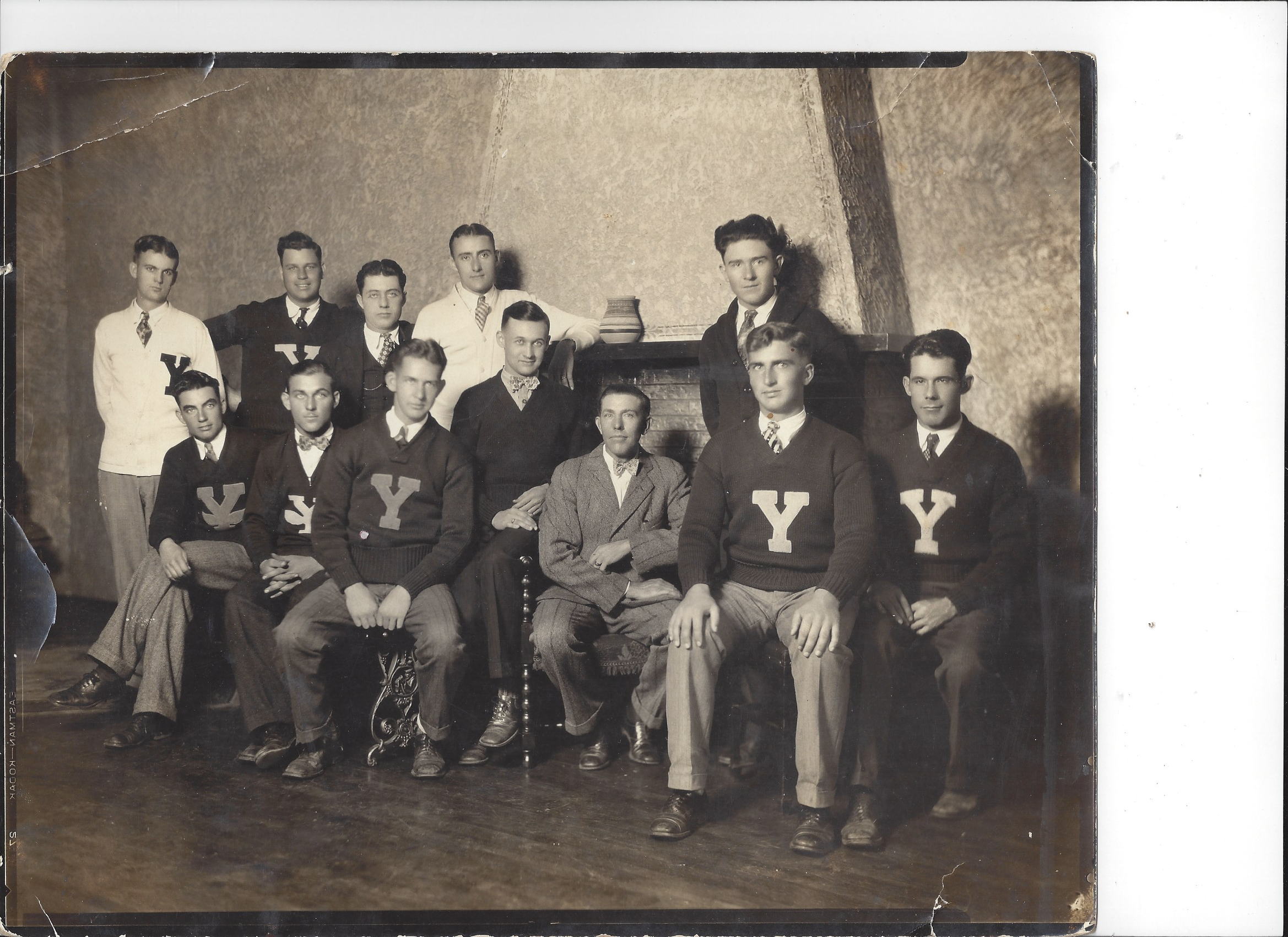
Coach McCandless and team

=== Football ===
Year	Team	Overall	Conference	Standing	Bowl/playoffs
Chadron Normal Eagles (Independent) (1919)
1919	Chadron Normal	2–3			
Chadron Normal:		2–3			
Nebraska Wesleyan Coyotes (Nebraska Intercollegiate Conference) (1920–1921)
1920	Nebraska Wesleyan	6–2–2	4–0–1	T–1st	
1921	Nebraska Wesleyan	8–3	5–0	1st	
Nebraska Wesleyan Coyotes (Nebraska Intercollegiate Conference / North Central Conference) (1922)
1922	Nebraska Wesleyan	4–4–1	4–1 / 0–2–1	3rd / T–8th	
Nebraska Wesleyan:		18–9–3	13–3–2		
Bowling Green Normals (Northwest Ohio League) (1923)
1923	Bowling Green	3–5	2–2		
Bowling Green:		3–5	2–2		
Bethany Bison (Tri-State Conference) (1924)
1924	Bethany	1–7–1	0–1	T–4th	
Bethany:		1–7–1	0–1		
York Panthers (Nebraska College Athletic Conference) (1928–1930)
1928	York	1–5–2	1–4–1	7th	
1929	York	1–5–2	1–4–1	7th	
1930	York	3–3–2	1–2–1	T–5th	
York:		5–13–6	3–10–3		
Total:		29–37–10			
