= Allen Snyder (coach) =

American sports coach (1899–1963)

Biographical details
- Born: July 30, 1899; Hummelstown, Pennsylvania, U.S.
- Died: April 27, 1963 (aged 63); Wooster, Ohio, U.S.

Playing career

Football
- 1918–1920: Wooster
- Position: Quarterback

Coaching career (HC unless noted)

Football
- 1921: New Philadelphia HS (OH)
- 1922: Bowling Green

Basketball
- 1921–1922: New Philadelphia HS (OH)
- 1922–1923: Bowling Green

Baseball
- 1922: New Philadelphia HS (OH)
- 1923: Bowling Green

Head coaching record
- Overall: 4–2–1 (college football); 9–4 (college basketball); 5–3 (college baseball)

Accomplishments and honors

Championships
- Football; 1 NOL (1922)

Allen Walton Snyder (July 30, 1899 – April 27, 1963) was an American football player and coach of football, basketball, and baseball. He was the fourth head football coach at Bowling Green State Normal School—now known as Bowling Green State University—serving for one season in 1922 and compiling a record of 4–2–1. Snyder was also the head basketball coach at Bowling Green State Normal during the 1922–23 season, tallying a mark of 9–4, and the school's head baseball coach in the spring of 1923, notching a record of 5–3.

Snyder was born in Hummelstown, Pennsylvania, and grew up in Vandergrift, Pennsylvania. He played college football as a quarterback at the College of Wooster in Wooster, Ohio before graduating in 1921. He was named the most valuable player of the Ohio Athletic Conference (OAC) in 1920.

Snyder began his coaching career in 1921 at New Philadelphia High School in New Philadelphia, Ohio, where he coached football, basketball, and baseball. After a year at New Philadelphia, he moved on to Bowling Green.

After leaving coaching, Snyder returned to his home town of Vandergrift, where he ran a paint and wallpaper store. He went back to his alma mater, Wooster, in 1958, as the director of alumni relations for the college. Snyder died on April 27, 1963, at Wooster Hospital, after suffering a heart attack.

== Head coaching record ==
=== College football ===
Year	Team	Overall	Conference	Standing	Bowl/playoffs
Bowling Green Normals (Northwest Ohio League) (1922)
1922	Bowling Green	4–2–1	2–0–1	1st	
Bowling Green:		4–2–1	2–0–1		
Total:		4–2–1			
National championship Conference title Conference division title or championship game berth
