= 1931 Bowling Green Falcons football team =

American college football season

1931 Bowling Green Falcons football
- Conference: Northwest Ohio League
- Record: 3–1–4 (0–1–2 NOL)
- Head coach: Warren Steller (8th season)
- Captain: Cliff Stevenson

1931 Northwest Ohio League football standings
	Conf.					Overall
Team	W		L		T	W		L		T
Defiance $	2	–	0	–	1	6	–	0	–	1
Bluffton	1	–	0	–	2	2	–	2	–	3
Bowling Green	0	–	1	–	2	3	–	1	–	4
Findlay	0	–	2	–	1	3	–	3	–	1
$ – Conference champion

The 1931 Bowling Green Falcons football team was an American football team that represented Bowling Green State College (later renamed Bowling Green State University) as a member of the Northwest Ohio League (NOL) during the 1931 college football season. In its eighth season under head coach Warren Steller, the team compiled a 3–1–4 record (0–1–2 against NOL opponents), shut out six of eight opponents (including three scoreless ties), finished in third place out of four teams in the NOL, and outscored all opponents by a total of 31 to 21. Cliff Stevenson was the team captain.

== Schedule ==
Date	Opponent	Site	Result	Source
September 26	at Baldwin–Wallace*	Berea, OH	T 0–0	
October 3	Mount Union	Bowling Green, OH	W 6–0	
October 10	at Western Reserve	Cleveland, OH	T 0–0	
October 17	Detroit City College*	Bowling Green, OH	W 13–0	
October 24	Bluffton	Bowling Green, OH	T 0–0	
October 31	at Defiance	Defiance, OH	L 0–15	
November 7	Findlay	Bowling Green, OH	T 6–6	
November 14	Central State (MI)	Bowling Green, OH	W 6–0	
*Non-conference game
