= 1929 Bowling Green Falcons football team =

American college football season

1929 Bowling Green Falcons football

NOL co-champion
- Conference: Northwest Ohio League
- Record: 4–2–1 (3–0–1 NOL)
- Head coach: Warren Steller (6th season)
- Captain: Harold Treece

1929 Northwest Ohio League football standings
	Conf.					Overall
Team	W		L		T	W		L		T
Bowling Green +	3	–	0	–	1	4	–	2	–	1
Toledo +	3	–	0	–	1	4	–	2	–	1
Defiance	2	–	2	–	0	3	–	4	–	1
Findlay	1	–	3	–	0	3	–	5	–	0
Bluffton	0	–	4	–	0	0	–	6	–	1
+ – Conference co-champions

The 1929 Bowling Green Falcons football team was an American football team that represented Bowling Green State College (later renamed Bowling Green State University) as a member of the Northwest Ohio League (NOL) during the 1929 college football season. In their sixth season under head coach Warren Steller, the Falcons compiled a 4–2–1 record (3–0–1 against NOL opponents), won the NOL championship, and outscored opponents by a total of 76 to 54. Harold Treece was the team captain.

== Schedule ==
Date	Opponent	Site	Result	Attendance	Source
September 28	Baldwin–Wallace*	Bowling Green, OH	L 0–18		
October 11	at Michigan State Normal*	Ypsilanti, MI	L 7–34		
October 18	Findlay	Bowling Green, OH	W 23–0		
October 25	at Toledo	Toledo, OH (rivalry)	T 0–0		
November 2	at Defiance	Defiance, OH	W 6–0		
November 9	Bluffton	College Field; Bowling Green, OH	W 15–0	2,550	
November 16	Detroit City College*	Bowling Green, OH	W 25–2		
*Non-conference game
