= Larry Bevan =

American football player and coach (1889–1930)

Biographical details
- Born: December 13, 1889; Carlisle, Ohio, U.S.
- Died: January 10, 1930 (aged 40); Detroit, Michigan, U.S.
- Education: Ohio Northern (1917, LLB)

Playing career

Football
- 1908–1909: Marietta

Baseball
- 1907: McKeesport Tubers
- Position: Center (football)

Coaching career (HC unless noted)

Football
- 1916–1917: Ohio Northern
- 1921–1924: Toledo Waite HS (OH)

Basketball
- 1916–1917: Ohio Northern
- 1919–1920: Ohio Northern

Head coaching record
- Overall: 6–11 (college football)

Lorenzo D. "Larry" Bevan (December 13, 1889 – January 10, 1930) was an American football player and coach. He served as the head football coach at Ohio Northern University in Ada, Ohio from 1916 to 1917, compiling a record of 6–11. Bevan was also the head basketball coach at Ohio Northern for two seasons, in 1916–17 and 1919–20. He played Minor League Baseball for one season, in 1907.

Bevan died on January 10, 1930, at Henry Ford Hospital in Detroit, Michigan. He was the brother of another college football and basketball coach, Roland Bevan.

== Head coaching record ==
=== College football ===
Year	Team	Overall	Conference	Standing	Bowl/playoffs
Ohio Northern (Ohio Athletic Conference) (1916–1917)
1916	Ohio Northern	3–7	2–5	T–10th	
1917	Ohio Northern	3–4	0–4	T–13th	
Ohio Northern:		6–11	2–9		
Total:		6–11			
