= Jim Nicholson (American football coach) =

Biographical details
- Born: July 13, 1906; Sandusky, Ohio, U.S.
- Died: May 8, 1983 (aged 76); Sylvania, Ohio, U.S.
- Education: University of Toledo College of Law

Playing career
- 1923–1926: Denison
- Position: Center

Coaching career (HC unless noted)
- 1927–1929: Sandusky HS (OH) (assistant)
- 1930–1935: Toledo

Head coaching record
- Overall: 20–16–4

James Albert Nicholson (July 13, 1906 – May 8, 1983) was an American football player and coach. He was the first full-time head football coach at the University of Toledo, serving from 1930 to 1935, and compiling a record of 20–16–4.

== Early life ==
Nicholson attended Denison University, where he played center for the school's football team and was captain of the 1926 squad. He also played center for the Big Red basketball team and ran the half mile for the track team. In 1934, Nicholson married Kathleen Covert, a public school teacher. They had four sons.

== Coach ==
After graduating, Nicholson was an assistant football coach and head basketball coach at Sandusky High School in Sandusky, Ohio. He also served as the city's superintendent of playgrounds.

In 1930, Nicholson accepted the head coaching position at Toledo, as it would provide him with enough money to attend law school. During his first season, the Rockets lost their first five games and Nicholson dismissed five players for lack of effort. The school canceled the 1931 football season because the funds for the football team were impounded in closed banks. When football resumed in 1932, Nicholson started Toledo's first recruiting program and pushed for the school to have its own football stadium, which would eventually led to the construction of the Glass Bowl. Following the 1934 season, a number of Toledo alumni requested a coaching change, but the school retained Nicholson. On October 17, 1935, Nicholson announced he would resign at the end of the season. Toledo finished the year with a 6–2–1; its best record to that point.

== Business ==
Nicholson passed the Ohio bar in 1936, but never practiced law. Instead, he and his assistant coach, Charles Wertz purchased the Builders and Industrial Supply Company out of receivership. Wertz later sold his interest in the business to Nicholson and it was renamed the Nicholson Concrete Company. In 1960, the company merged with the Toledo Plaster & Supply Co. to form Nicholson Concrete & Supply Co. In 1968, he was succeeded as president by his son, J. Patrick Nicholson, but remained involved with the company as an advisor.

== Fundraising ==
Nicholson led the fundraising drive for the construction of St. Francis de Sales School and also led four tax increase campaigns – one to benefit the University and three to benefit public schools.

== Honors ==
In 1963, the University of Toledo created the Nicholson Trophy, which was given annually to the football team's most valuable player. The Shoe Bowl trophy, which was given to the winner of Toledo's high school football championship, was also named for him.

In 1976, Nicholson was elected to the Denison University Athletic Hall of Fame.

== Later life ==
Kathleen Nicholson died in 1974 and Nicholson later remarried Catherine Weir. He spent his later years in Pompano Beach, Florida. He died on May 8, 1983, while visiting his son in Sylvania, Ohio. He was survived by his second wife, four sons, two stepchildren, and a foster child.

== Head coaching record ==
Year	Team	Overall	Conference	Standing	Bowl/playoffs
Toledo Rockets (Northwest Ohio League) (1930–1931)
1930	Toledo	2–5–1	1–2–1	4th	
1931	No team				
Toledo Rockets (Ohio Athletic Conference) (1932–1935)
1932	Toledo	3–4	3–1	T–4th	
1933	Toledo	4–2–2	3–2–1	T–7th	
1934	Toledo	5–3	4–1	7th	
1935	Toledo	6–2–1	4–1	3rd	
Toledo:		20–16–4	15–7–2		
Total:		20–16–4			
