= 1925 Bowling Green Normals football team =

American college football season

1925 Bowling Green Normals football

NOL champion
- Conference: Northwest Ohio League
- Record: 3–1–3 (2–0–1 NOL)
- Head coach: Warren Steller (2nd season)
- Captain: Harry Crawford
- Home stadium: College Field

1925 Northwest Ohio League football standings
	Conf.					Overall
Team	W		L		T	W		L		T
Bowling Green	2	–	0	–	1	3	–	1	–	3
Toledo	1	–	0	–	0	1	–	8	–	0
Findlay	2	–	1	–	1	5	–	2	–	2
Bluffton	1	–	2	–	0	1	–	3	–	0
Defiance	0	–	3	–	0	0	–	6	–	2
$ – Conference champion

The 1925 Bowling Green Normals football team was an American football team that represented Bowling Green State University as a member of the Northwest Ohio League (NOL) during the 1925 college football season. In its second season under head coach Warren Steller, the team compiled a 3–1–3 record (2–0–1 against conference opponents), and won the NOL championship. The team opened the season 0–1–3 but won the final three games of the season. The team played its home games at College Field in Bowling Green, Ohio.

Paul E. Landis, Robert Younkins, and Franklin Skibbie were assistant coaches. Harry Crawford was the team captain.

Bowling Green refused to play a post-season game with Toledo after university officials, including coach Steller, witnessed unsportsmanlike conduct in an Armistice Day game between Toledo and Findlay.

== Schedule ==
Date	Opponent	Site	Result	Source
October 3	at Otterbein*	Westerville, OH	T 0–0	
October 10	Michigan State Normal*	College Field; Bowling Green, OH	L 0–14	
October 16	Capital*	College Field; Bowling Green, OH	T 0–0	
October 24	at Findlay	Findlay, OH	T 0–0	
October 31	at Defiance	Defiance, OH	W 2–0	
November 7	Bluffton^{†}	College Field; Bowling Green, OH	W 6–0	
November 20	Ashland*	College Field; Bowling Green, OH	W 26–14	
*Non-conference game; ^{†}Homecoming

== Roster ==
- Claude Berry, halfback, Bowling Green, OH, 155 pounds
- Ralph Castner, tackle, Bowling Green, OH, 227 pounds
- George Crawford, Graysville, OH, 140 pounds
- Harry Crawford, end, Pemberville, OH, 141 pounds
- George Evans, tackle, Bloomdale, OH, 171 pounds
- Edward Fries, quarterback, Bowling Green, OH, 135 pounds
- Willie Gahn, halfback
- Vaughn Gill, fullback, Delta, OH, 152 pounds
- Ora Knecht, guard, Edgerton, OH, 234 pounds
- Homer Moscoe, Potsdam, NY, 148 pounds
- Olds, center
- Ostrander, end
- Wilbur Swartz, guard, Cygnet, OH, 168 pounds
