= 1921 Bowling Green Normals football team =

American college football season

1921 Bowling Green Normals football

NOL champion
- Conference: Northwest Ohio League
- Record: 3–1–1 (3–0 NOL)
- Head coach: Earl Krieger (1st season)
- Captain: Franklin "Gus" Skibbie

1921 Northwest Ohio League football standings
	Conf.					Overall
Team	W		L		T	W		L		T
Bowling Green $	3	–	0	–	0	3	–	1	–	1
Toledo			–			3	–	5	–	0
Findlay	0	–	3	–	0	0	–	3	–	0
$ – Conference champion

The 1921 Bowling Green Normals football team was an American football team that represented Bowling Green State Normal School (later Bowling Green State University) as a member of the Northwest Ohio League (NOL) during the 1921 college football season. In its third season of intercollegiate football, Bowling Green compiled a 3–1–1 record and outscored opponents by a total of 178 to 34. Earl Krieger was the head coach, and Franklin "Gus" Skibbie was the team captain.

The team scored 151 points against Findlay, the highest total of the 1921 season by any football team in the country.

== Schedule ==
Date	Opponent	Site	Result	Source
October 1	Kent State*	Bowling Green, OH (rivalry)	T 0–0	
October 9	at Defiance	Defiance, OH	W 7–0	
October 15	Findlay	Bowling Green, OH	W 151–0	
October 21	at Ashland*	Ashland, OH	L 0–27	
October 29	at Toledo	Toledo, OH (rivalry)	W 20–7	
*Non-conference game
