= 2015 GoDaddy Bowl =

2015 GoDaddy Bowl can refer to:

- 2015 GoDaddy Bowl (January), played as part of the 2014–15 college football bowl season between the Arkansas State Red Wolves and the Toledo Rockets
- 2015 GoDaddy Bowl (December), played as part of the 2015–16 college football bowl season between the Bowling Green Falcons and the Georgia Southern Eagles
