= 1927 Toledo Rockets football team =

American college football season

1927 Toledo Rockets football

NOL champion
- Conference: Northwest Ohio League
- Record: 5–2 (3–0 NOL)
- Head coach: Boni Petcoff (2nd season)

1927 Northwest Ohio League football standings
	Conf.					Overall
Team	W		L		T	W		L		T
Toledo $	3	–	0	–	0	5	–	2	–	0
Bowling Green	2	–	1	–	0	5	–	1	–	1
Bluffton	2	–	2	–	0	4	–	2	–	0
Defiance	2	–	2	–	0	5	–	3	–	0
Findlay	0	–	4	–	0	0	–	9	–	0
$ – Conference champion

The 1927 Toledo Rockets football team was an American football team that represented Toledo University (renamed the University of Toledo in 1967) during the 1927 college football season. Led by first-year coach Boni Petcoff, Toledo compiled a 5–2 overall record and 3–0 in conference play, earning the Northwest Ohio League championship.

== Schedule ==
Date	Opponent	Site	Result	Attendance	Source
October 1	Alma*	Toledo, OH	L 0–30		
October 8	Hillsdale*	Toledo, OH	W 19–0		
October 15	Detroit City College*	Toledo, OH	W 13–0		
October 22	at Bluffton	Bluffton, OH	W 6–0		
November 4	Defiance	Toledo, OH	W 16–7		
November 11	at Findlay	Findlay, OH	W 34–0		
November 18	at Wittenberg*	Springfield, OH	L 0–25		
*Non-conference game
