= Joseph Dwyer (American football) =

American football coach

Biographical details
- Born: April 8, 1893
- Died: November 21, 1968 (aged 75); Berkeley Heights, New Jersey, U.S.

Coaching career (HC unless noted)
- 1921–1922: Toledo

Head coaching record
- Overall: 5–7–3 (college)

Michael Joseph Dwyer (April 8, 1893 – November 21, 1968) was an American college football coach. He served as the head football coach at the University of Toledo from 1921 to 1922, compiling a record of 5–7–3. Dwyer was the husband of Florence P. Dwyer, a member of the United States House of Representatives from 1957 to 1973. His brother, Pat Dwyer, was also a football coach.

A native of Antrim, Pennsylvania, Dwyer graduated from Mount St. Mary's University in Emmitsburg, Maryland in 1916. He later worked for Western Electric in Kearny, New Jersey, retiring as public relations director in 1957. Dwyer died on November 21, 1968, at John E. Runnells Hospital in Berkeley Heights, New Jersey.

== Head coaching record ==
=== College ===
Year	Team	Overall	Conference	Standing	Bowl/playoffs
Toledo Blue and Gold (Northwest Ohio League) (1921–1922)
1921	Toledo	3–5			
1922	Toledo	2–2–3			
Toledo:		5–7–3			
Total:		5–7–3			
