= 1922 Bowling Green Normals football team =

American college football season

1922 Bowling Green Normals football

NOL champion
- Conference: Northwest Ohio League
- Record: 4–2–1 (2–0–1 NOL)
- Head coach: Allen Snyder (1st season)
- Captain: Orville Raberding

1922 Northwest Ohio League football standings
	Conf.					Overall
Team	W		L		T	W		L		T
Bowling Green $	2	–	0	–	1	4	–	2	–	1
Toledo			–			2	–	2	–	3
$ – Conference champion

The 1922 Bowling Green Normals football team was an American football team that represented Bowling Green State Normal School (later Bowling Green State University) as a member of the Northwest Ohio League (NOL) during the 1922 college football season. In its first and only season under head coach Allen Snyder, the team compiled a 4–2–1 record and outscored opponents by a total of 98 to 46. Orville Raberding was the team captain.

== Schedule ==
Date	Opponent	Site	Result	Source
September 30	at Ohio Northern*	Ada, OH	L 0–27	
October 7	Adrian*	Bowling Green, OH	L 0–7	
October 14	at Findlay	Findlay, OH	W 26–0	
October 19	Defiance	Bowling Green, OH	W 22–0	
October 28	at Huntington*	Huntington, IN	W 38–6	
November 4	Toledo^{†}	Bowling Green, OH (rivalry)	T 6–6	
November 11	at Kent State*	Kent, OH (rivalry)	W 6–0	
*Non-conference game; ^{†}Homecoming
