= 1923 Toledo Rockets football team =

American college football season

1923 Toledo Rockets football

NOL champion
- Conference: Northwest Ohio League
- Record: 6–4 (3–0 NOL)
- Head coach: Pat Dwyer (1st season)

1923 Northwest Ohio League football standings
| | Conf. | | | | | Overall |
| Team | W | | L | | T | W | | L | | T |
|---|---|---|---|---|---|---|---|---|---|---|
| Toledo $ | 3 | – | 0 | – | 0 | 6 | – | 4 | – | 0 |
| Bowling Green | 2 | – | 2 | – | 0 | 3 | – | 5 | – | 0 |
$ – Conference champion

The 1923 Toledo Rockets football team was an American football team that represented Toledo University (renamed the University of Toledo in 1967) during the 1923 college football season. In their first season under head coach Pat Dwyer, the team compiled a 6–4 record, the first winning season in program history, won the Northwest Ohio League championship, and shut out its opponents in all six victories. The team's 87 points against Findlay established the program's single game scoring record and remains the second highest point total in program history. Gib Stick's 30 point tally in the Findlay game also remains tied for the second highest single game scoring total in program history.

The team captain was James Pierce, the first African-American to hold the position. Pierce became a professor after graduation.

According to the Toledo media guide, the program's nickname dates to the 1923 season. The 1923 season opened with a game against Carnegie Tech in Pittsburgh. According to the media guide, the Pittsburgh reporters in the press box were surprised to learn that the Toledo team did not have a nickname and asked a Toledo student, James Neal, to come up with a nickname. Neal suggested the team be called the Skyrockets, and the sportswriters shortened the name to Rockets. The Rockets nickname has been in use since 1923.

== Schedule ==
| Date | Opponent | Site | Result | Attendance | Source |
|---|---|---|---|---|---|
| September 29 | at Carnegie Tech* | Tech Field; Pittsburgh, PA | L 12–32 | | |
| October 6 | Michigan State Normal* | Toledo, OH | W 13–0 | | |
| October 13 | at Akron* | Buchtel Field; Akron, OH | L 3–10 | | |
| October 19 | Defiance* | Toledo, OH | W 26–0 | | |
| October 27 | Bowling Green | Toledo, OH (rivalry) | W 27–0 | | |
| November 3 | Findlay* | Toledo, OH | W 87–0 | | |
| November 10 | Grand Rapids* | Toledo, OH | W 32–0 | | |
| November 17 | Detroit Junior College* | Toledo, OH | W 38–0 | | |
| November 24 | at Hillsdale* | Hillsdale, MI | L 19–32 | | |
| December 1 | Notre Dame reserves* | | L 0–31 | | |
*Non-conference game
