= Pat Dwyer (American football) =

American football player and coach (1884–1939)

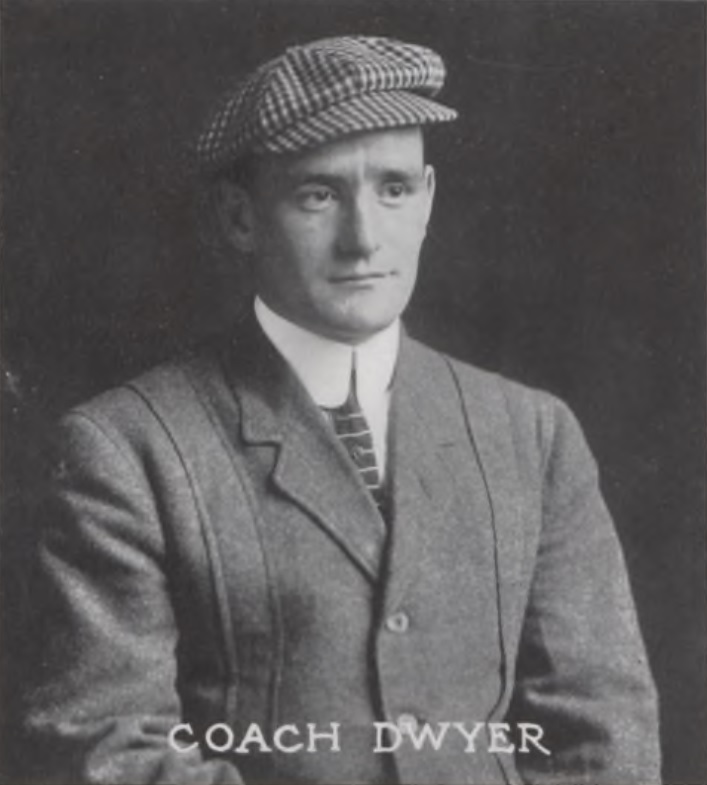

Biographical details
- Born: August 30, 1884; Fall Brook, Pennsylvania, U.S.
- Died: March 29, 1939 (aged 54); Philipsburg, Pennsylvania, U.S.

Playing career
- 1904–1907: Penn
- Position: Center

Coaching career (HC unless noted)
- 1908: Auburn (assistant)
- 1911–1913: LSU
- 1914: Penn (assistant)
- 1918–1921: Scott HS (OH)
- 1922: Detroit (line)
- 1923–1925: Toledo

Administrative career (AD unless noted)
- 1924–1926: Toledo

Head coaching record
- Overall: 28–22–2 (college)

Accomplishments and honors

Championships
- 1 High school football national championship (1919); 1 Northwest Ohio League (1923)

James Kain "Pat" Dwyer (August 30, 1884 – March 29, 1939) was an American football player and coach. He served as the head coach at Louisiana State University (1911–1913) and the University of Toledo (1923–1925), compiling a career record of 28–22–2.

== Playing career ==
Dwyer was a graduate of the University of Pennsylvania. He lettered in football two seasons, 1906 and 1907, for Penn under coach Carl Sheldon Williams. In 1906, Dwyer helped the Quakers to a 7–2–3 record. In 1907, Penn went 11–1, and was retroactively awarded a national championship by Parke H. Davis with other organizations naming Yale as champion. These Penn teams were led by All-Americans August Ziegler at guard and Dexter Draper at tackle.

== Coaching career ==
Dwyer began his coaching career in 1908 at Auburn University. From 1911 to 1913, he was the head coach at Louisiana State University. In 1914, he returned to his alma mater as an assistant coach. In 1918, he succeeded another Penn alum, Byron W. Dickson as head coach of Scott High School in Toledo Ohio. In 1919, Scott competed in the high school football national championship game, where they played Everett High School of Everett, Washington to a 7–7 tie. In 1922, he became the line coach at the University of Detroit.

In 1923, Dwyer succeeded his brother Mike as head football coach at the University of Toledo. The following year he was given the additional job of athletic director. He left the school on June 15, 1926, after he chose not to have his contract renewed.

From 1926 to 1932, Dwyer was an official for National Football League and college football games.

== Business ==
Outside of football, Dwyer worked as manufacturing engineer. He was a levee contractor in the southern United States and a production engineer for the Hercules Powder Company before moving to Toledo to become general manager of the McCarthy Drill and Toll Corporation. In 1932, he moved to Corning, New York to work for the Corning Glass Works. His final job was as an assistant resident inspector in State College, Pennsylvania. Dwyer died of a heart attack on March 29, 1939, in Philipsburg, Pennsylvania.

== Head coaching record ==
=== College ===
Year	Team	Overall	Conference	Standing	Bowl/playoffs
LSU Tigers (Southern Intercollegiate Athletic Association) (1911–1913)
1911	LSU	6–3	1–1		
1912	LSU	4–3	1–3		
1913	LSU	6–1–2	1–1–1		
LSU:		16–7–2	3–5–1		
Toledo Rockets (Northwest Ohio League) (1923–1925)
1923	Toledo	6–4	3–0	1st	
1924	Toledo	5–3			
1925	Toledo	1–8	1–0		
Toledo:		12–15			
Total:		28–22–2			
National championship Conference title Conference division title or championship game berth
