= John Brandeberry =

American football player and coach (1893–1953)

Biographical details
- Born: December 13, 1893; Newton Falls, Ohio, U.S.
- Died: September 23, 1953 (aged 59); Toledo, Ohio, U.S.
- Education: Mount Union College; Ohio State University; University of Michigan

Coaching career (HC unless noted)
- 1917: Toledo

Head coaching record
- Overall: 0–3

John Benjamin Brandeberry (December 13, 1893 – September 23, 1953) was an American engineering professor and college football coach. He was the first head football coach at the University of Toledo, serving for one season, in 1917, and compiling a record of 0–3.

== Personal life ==
Brandeberry was born to John B. and Lyndie (Kistler) Brandeberry on December 13, 1893 in Newton Falls, Ohio. He received his bachelor of science from Mount Union College in 1913, his Master of Arts from Ohio State University in 1915, and his Doctor of Philosophy from the University of Michigan in 1932. In 1920, he married Dorothy Kendall. They had one daughter, Barbara Jean. Dorothy Brandeberry died unexpectedly in 1944. Later that year he married Aubrey Mather Starner. They had three children, John Barton, Margaret Louise, and Carol. He also adopted her two children from her first marriage (she was a widow).

== Career ==
From 1913 to 1914, Brandeberry taught science in Newberry, Michigan. While attending Ohio State, he was a graduate assistant. In 1915, He joined the faculty at the University of Toledo.

In 1917, Brandeberry organized the University of Toledo's first football team. He recruited 13 players from the student body and paid for uniforms, a practice field, food, and transportation out of his own pocket. Toledo lost its first game to Detroit, 145–0. It played two more times that year, and were blown out those games as well, 90–0 against Ohio Northern and 27–0 against Findlay. In 1919, he served as the school's faculty manager of athletics and put together that year's football schedule.

From 1943 until his unexpected death in 1953, Brandeberry was dean of the University of Toledo's College of Engineering. In 1950, he chaired an interim operating committee that ran the university following the resignation of president Wilbur W. White.

== Head coaching record ==
| Year | Team | Overall | Conference | Standing | Bowl/playoffs |
|---|---|---|---|---|---|
Toledo Blue and Gold (Independent) (1917)
| 1917 | Toledo | 0–3 | | | |
| Toledo: | | 0–3 | | | |
| Total: | | 0–3 | | | |
