= Toledo Rockets football =

Football team of the University of Toledo

| 2026 Toledo Rockets football team |
- First season: 1917; 109 years ago
- Head coach: Mike Jacobs; 1st season, 4–2 (.667)
- Location: Toledo, Ohio
- Stadium: Glass Bowl (capacity: 26,038)
- NCAA division: Division I FBS
- Conference: MAC
- Colors: Midnight blue and gold
- All-time record: 596–461–24 (.562)
- Bowl record: 12–11 (.522)

Conference championships
- NOL: 1923, 1927, 1929 MAC: 1967, 1969, 1970, 1971, 1981, 1984, 1990, 1995, 2001, 2004, 2017, 2022

Division championships
- MAC West: 1997, 1998, 2000, 2001, 2002, 2004, 2005, 2011, 2014, 2015, 2017, 2022, 2023
- Consensus All-Americans: 2
- Rivalries: Bowling Green (rivalry) Western Michigan
- Fight song: U of Toledo
- Website: UTRockets.com

The Toledo Rockets football team is a college football program in Division I FBS, representing the University of Toledo. The Rockets compete in the Mid-American Conference. Toledo began playing football in 1917, although it did not field teams in 1931, 1943, 1944, and 1945. Since the inception of the AP Poll in 1936, Toledo has finished in the Top 25 four times with its highest finish coming in 1970 when it ranked No. 12 after finishing 12–0. Toledo has a 12–11 record in bowl games.

== History ==
=== Early history (1917–1962) ===
Toledo first fielded a football team in 1917, under the leadership of John Brandeberry. According to Toledo Rockets lore, the team began when a group of students purchased uniforms from a sporting goods store, then arranged a game against the University of Detroit in order to settle the debt. Brandeberry stepped in to coach the team, which promptly lost the game 145–0 (but settled the debt).

For the first few years Toledo played without a nickname, but was dubbed the "Rockets" after two long touchdown runs in a 1923 loss to Carnegie Tech. That season also saw Toledo win its first conference title. Clarence Spears served as the Rocket's head coach and athletics director for seven seasons, from 1936 to 1942. Under his tutelage, the Rockets compiled a record of 38–26–2. which included five consecutive winning seasons. In two seasons, the Rockets compiled a record of 11–10 under head coach Skip Stahley. Forrest England served as Toledo's head coach for two seasons in 1954 and 1955, compiling a record of 9–7–2.

=== Jim Nicholson era (1930–1935) ===
In April 1930, Toledo hired Jim Nicholson to become the Rockets first full-time football coach. With his upgraded schedule and organized recruiting, Nicholson helped build UT's team into a powerful and respected program. In his final season, the Rockets finished 6–2–1, including a 63–0 win over Bowling Green Falcons. The huge win sparked the BGSU fans to riot leading to a 13-year break between the two universities. This event also started the Toledo v.s BGSU Rivalry.

Nicholson help design the Glass Bowl stadium, and continued to be involved in the school's athletics following his retirement by reorganizing the Varsity 'T' Club. He finished his career as the Rocket's head coach with a 20–16–4 record.

=== Clarence Spears era (1936–1942) ===
Clarence Spears continued to help the UT football program grow following Nicholson, with 38 career victories that stood as a UT record for 30 years before being surpassed by Frank Lauterbur's mark of 48 wins. In 1942 when UT's football program was suspended due to WWII, Spears left to take the head coaching job at Maryland. His overall record as head coach for the Rockets was 38–26–2.

=== Bill Orwig years (1946–1947) ===
Although head coach for the Rockets for just two seasons, Bill Orwig established one of the best winning percentages in the program's history (.762). He is one of few coaches in UT to coach two sports at once, overseeing both the football and basketball teams. His overall record as football coach was 15–4–2.

=== Frank Lauterbur era (1963–1970) ===
Affectionately known at "FXL" by his team, Frank Lauterbur coached the Rockets during one of the most successful eras of the program's history. Under his leadership, Toledo won three MAC titles including the first in the school history in 1967, and won both of their two consecutive Tangerine Bowl appearances. The team's 35 consecutive game wins during Lauterbur's era ranks fifth in the longest winning streaks in NCAA Division I football. Charles "Chuck" Ealey led the Rockets to all 35 victories as starting quarterback, the most wins without a loss by a quarterback in FBS history.

In 1970, the Rockets finished the season ranked 12th in the AP Poll and 17th in the UPI poll. After capping that season with a second Tangerine Bowl victory, Lauterbur took a head coaching job at Iowa. His overall 48–32–2 record at UT includes two perfect seasons in 1969 and 1970.

=== Jack Murphy era (1971–1976) ===
Jack Murphy, an assistant under Frank Lauterbur and coach of Heidelberg, took over as head coach for the Rockets in 1971. In his first season, he led the Rockets to an undefeated 12–0 record, a MAC Championship title, a third consecutive Tangerine Bowl win, and a 14th ranking in the year's final AP poll. That was also the year Toledo's famed winning streak reached 35 games, a streak begun under former coach Lauterbur. Murphy led the Rockets to a 35–32 record before his departure in 1976.

=== Chuck Stobart era (1977–1981) ===
Chuck Stobart held the head coaching position for five seasons, rebuilding the Rockets into a stronger program and premier MAC conference contender. He earned MAC "Coach of the Year" honors in 1979 and 1981. In 1981, he led UT to a 9–3 record, a MAC Championship title, and a memorable 27–25 victory over San Jose State in the California Bowl that was decided on a last-second field goal by Tony Lee. Stobart left UT to become the head coach at Utah in 1981, departing with an overall 24–31–1 record with the Rockets.

=== Dan Simrell era (1982–1989) ===
Dan Simrell took over the UT football program after Stobart's departure, going on to coach through eight seasons with a total of 50 victories, the third-most wins of any coach in the program's history. In 1984 with a 9–2–1 record, he led UT to a Mid-American Conference title and a California Bowl appearance.

A native of Toledo, Simrell was the first UT alum to coach the football team. He lettered as a quarterback from 1962 to 1964 and served as an assistant coach from 1971 to 1981. Overall, Simrell posted four winning seasons of his total eight as head coach, with an overall 50–37–2 record. He resigned following the 1989 season.

=== Nick Saban (1990) ===
Nick Saban was head coach of the Rockets for one season, leading Toledo to a 9–2 record and a MAC co-championship in 1990. The two games the Rockets lost that season were by narrow margins: one point to Central Michigan, and four points to Navy. While at the helm of the Rockets, Saban turned down an application of Urban Meyer, who was looking for a job on his staff as an assistant coach.

Saban left Toledo after the 1990 season to become the NFL's Cleveland Browns defensive coordinator under Bill Belichick, and later head coaching positions at Michigan State (1995–1999), LSU (2000–2004), the NFL's Miami Dolphins (2005–2006) and Alabama.

=== Gary Pinkel era (1991–2000) ===
Gary Pinkel came to Toledo from his post as offensive coordinator at Washington. With an overall record of 73–37–3, he has the most wins in UT history. He also has the second best winning percentage (.659) among UT coaches who led the program for at least four years.

Pinkel led the 1995 Rockets to an 11–0–1 record, a Las Vegas Bowl victory, and end of season rankings in the Top 25 of both the AP poll and Coaches poll. In 1997, Pinkel's Rockets took the first-ever MAC West title and appeared in the MAC Championship game. The Rockets finished the season 9–3, with a mid-season ranking high of 18 in the AP poll. They repeated as MAC West champions in the following 1998 season.

In Pinkel's final season in 2000, the Rockets went 10–1, including a 24–6 victory over the Penn State Nittany Lions and a 25th-place ranking in the final regular season polls. Following that season, Pinkel took a head coaching position at Missouri. He's been inducted into four college football halls of fame: Toledo, Kent State (his alma mater), the Mid-American Conference, and the Missouri Hall of Fame (in two categories)

=== Tom Amstutz era (2001–2008) ===
Known as "Toledo Tom", Tom Amstutz led the Rockets to some of the greatest successes, including two MAC Championships, four MAC West titles, and four bowl game appearances. A native of Toledo and former Rocket player himself, was promoted from defensive coordinator, a post he held under Saban and Pinkel, to the Rockets head coach after Pinkel's departure.

During his eight seasons as head coach, Amstutz led the Rockets to impressive victories over No. 9 Pittsburgh, Minnesota, Kansas, and Iowa State. Perhaps the greatest though was a 13–10 victory in 2008 against the Michigan Wolverines in Ann Arbor. The Rockets are the first and only MAC football team to beat Michigan. Amstutz resigned as head coach following the 2008 season. His final record as head coach was 58–41, including victories at the 2001 Motor City Bowl and 2005 GMAC Bowl.

=== Tim Beckman era (2009–2011) ===
In December 2008, Toledo hired Oklahoma State defensive coordinator Tim Beckman as the new head coach for the Rockets. He revived the football program, leading the team through consecutive winning seasons with two bowl appearances and one MAC West Division co-championship. In 2011, the team earned an appearance in the Military Bowl. Beckman resigned at the end of the regular season before the bowl game to take on a head coaching position at the University of Illinois. His record at Toledo is 21–16.

=== Matt Campbell era (2012–2015) ===
Named interim head coach following Tim Beckman's departure for Illinois, Matt Campbell made his debut as the Rockets coach with a 42–41 victory over Air Force in the 2011 Military Bowl. At 32 years old, he was the youngest FBS coach at the time, and went on to enjoy four winning seasons and an overall record of 35–15. The team saw big victories along the way with a win over No. 18 Cincinnati in 2012 and a 2015 upset of No. 18 Arkansas in Little Rock, Toledo's first win over an SEC team. They also went on to a bowl victory over Arkansas State in the 2015 GoDaddy Bowl. Campbell resigned as head coach at the end of the 2015 regular season to accept a head coaching job at Iowa State.

=== Jason Candle era (2016–2025) ===
Initially planning to following Matt Campbell to Iowa State for an assistant coaching position, Jason Candle changed course and quickly returned to Toledo after the Rockets offered him the head coaching position. Like his predecessor, his first game as head coach was a bowl victory, with the Rockets defeating No. 24 Temple in the 2015 Boca Raton Bowl.

In 2017, the Rockets defeated Western Michigan to become the outright MAC West Division champions for the first time since 1998, and their first trip to the MAC Championship since 2004. Toledo went on to defeat Akron 45–28 and win its first MAC Championship in 13 years.

In 2022, the Rockets defeated Ball State and Western Michigan lost to Northern Illinois to become the MAC West Division co-champions with Eastern Michigan. Toledo beat Eastern Michigan early in the season so the Rockets had the tie-breaker. Toledo went on to defeat Ohio 17–7 in the MAC Championship.

In 2024, Candle tied Gary Pinkel as the winningest coach in Toledo football history with 73 wins after beating Pittsburgh in the GameAbove Sports Bowl.

== Conference affiliations ==
Toledo has been both independent and affiliated with multiple conferences.

- Independent (1917–1920)
- Northwest Ohio League (1921–1930)
- Ohio Athletic Conference (1932–1947)
- Independent (1948–1951)
- Mid-American Conference (1952–present)

== Championships ==
=== Conference championships ===
The Rockets have won 15 conference titles, with 12 of them being during their affiliation with the Mid-American Conference.

| Year | Conference | Coach | Record | Conference record |
|---|---|---|---|---|
| 1923 | Northwest Ohio League | Pat Dwyer | 6–4 | – |
| 1927 | Northwest Ohio League | Boni Petcoff | 5–2 | – |
| 1929 | Northwest Ohio League | Boni Petcoff | 4–2–1 | – |
| 1967 | Mid-American Conference | Frank Lauterbur | 9–1 | 5–1 |
| 1969 | Mid-American Conference | Frank Lauterbur | 11–0 | 5–0 |
| 1970 | Mid-American Conference | Frank Lauterbur | 12–0 | 5–0 |
| 1971 | Mid-American Conference | John Murphy | 12–0 | 5–0 |
| 1981 | Mid-American Conference | Chuck Stobart | 9–3 | 8–1 |
| 1984 | Mid-American Conference | Dan Simrell | 8–3–1 | 7–1–1 |
| 1990 | Mid-American Conference | Nick Saban | 9–2 | 7–1 |
| 1995 | Mid-American Conference | Gary Pinkel | 11–0–1 | 7–0–1 |
| 2001 | Mid-American Conference | Tom Amstutz | 10–2 | 5–2 |
| 2004 | Mid-American Conference | Tom Amstutz | 9–4 | 7–1 |
| 2017 | Mid-American Conference | Jason Candle | 11–2 | 7–1 |
| 2022 | Mid-American Conference | Jason Candle | 8–5 | 5–3 |

=== Division championships ===
In the division era (1997–2023) of the MAC, Toledo won 13 division titles.

| Year | Division | Coach | Opponent | CG Result |
|---|---|---|---|---|
| 1997 | MAC - West | Gary Pinkel | Marshall | L 14–34 |
| 1998 | MAC - West | Gary Pinkel | Marshall | L 17–23 |
| 2000† | MAC - West | Gary Pinkel | N/A lost tiebreaker to Western Michigan | |
| 2001† | MAC - West | Tom Amstutz | Marshall | W 41–36 |
| 2002† | MAC - West | Tom Amstutz | Marshall | L 45–49 |
| 2004† | MAC - West | Tom Amstutz | Miami (OH) | W 35–27 |
| 2005† | MAC - West | Tom Amstutz | N/A lost tiebreaker to Northern Illinois | |
| 2011† | MAC - West | Tim Beckman | N/A lost tiebreaker to Northern Illinois | |
| 2014† | MAC - West | Matt Campbell | N/A lost tiebreaker to Northern Illinois | |
| 2015† | MAC - West | Matt Campbell | N/A lost tiebreaker to Northern Illinois | |
| 2017 | MAC - West | Jason Candle | Akron | W 45–28 |
| 2022† | MAC - West | Jason Candle | Ohio | W 17–7 |
| 2023 | MAC - West | Jason Candle | Miami (OH) | L 14–23 |

† Co-champions

== Bowl games ==
Toledo has appeared in 23 NCAA-sanctioned post-season bowl games since 1969, and has an 12–11 record overall.

| Season | Date played | Bowl Game | Opponent | Result | Head Coach |
|---|---|---|---|---|---|
| 1969 | December 26, 1969 | Tangerine Bowl | Davidson | W 56–33 | Frank Lauterbur |
| 1970 | December 28, 1970 | Tangerine Bowl | William & Mary | W 40–12 | Frank Lauterbur |
| 1971 | December 28, 1971 | Tangerine Bowl | Richmond | W 28–3 | Jack Murphy |
| 1981 | December 19, 1981 | California Bowl | San Jose State | W 27–25 | Chuck Stobart |
| 1984 | December 15, 1984 | California Bowl | UNLV | L 13–30^{*} | Dan Simrell |
| 1995 | December 14, 1995 | Las Vegas Bowl | Nevada | W 40–37^{OT} | Gary Pinkel |
| 2001 | December 29, 2001 | Motor City Bowl | Cincinnati | W 32–16 | Tom Amstutz |
| 2002 | December 26, 2002 | Motor City Bowl | Boston College | L 25–51 | Tom Amstutz |
| 2004 | December 27, 2004 | Motor City Bowl | Connecticut | L 10–39 | Tom Amstutz |
| 2005 | December 21, 2005 | GMAC Bowl | UTEP | W 45–13 | Tom Amstutz |
| 2010 | December 26, 2010 | Little Caesars Pizza Bowl | FIU | L 32–34 | Tim Beckman |
| 2011 | December 28, 2011 | Military Bowl | Air Force | W 42–41 | Matt Campbell |
| 2012 | December 15, 2012 | Famous Idaho Potato Bowl | Utah State | L 15–41 | Matt Campbell |
| 2014 | January 4, 2015 | GoDaddy Bowl | Arkansas State | W 63–44 | Matt Campbell |
| 2015 | December 22, 2015 | Boca Raton Bowl | Temple | W 32–17 | Jason Candle |
| 2016 | December 17, 2016 | Camellia Bowl | Appalachian State | L 28–31 | Jason Candle |
| 2017 | December 23, 2017 | Dollar General Bowl | Appalachian State | L 0–34 | Jason Candle |
| 2018 | December 21, 2018 | Bahamas Bowl | FIU | L 32–35 | Jason Candle |
| 2021 | December 17, 2021 | Bahamas Bowl | Middle Tennessee | L 24–31 | Jason Candle |
| 2022 | December 20, 2022 | Boca Raton Bowl | Liberty | W 21–19 | Jason Candle |
| 2023 | December 30, 2023 | Arizona Bowl | Wyoming | L 15–16 | Jason Candle |
| 2024 | December 26, 2024 | GameAbove Sports Bowl | Pittsburgh | W 48–46^{6OT} | Jason Candle |
| 2025 | December 23, 2025 | Boca Raton Bowl | Louisville | L 22–27 | Robert Weiner (interim) |

From 1946 through 1949, the Rockets played a post-season game named the Glass Bowl that was played at their stadium. They were 3–1, losing the last game to the Cincinnati Bearcats. Like some other postseason match-ups of the era, such as the Grape Bowl and the Optimist Bowl, results are listed in NCAA records, but the games were not considered NCAA-sanctioned bowls.
^*After the 1984 California Bowl, it was found that UNLV had allegedly used ineligible players during the season. Despite the fact that they were not used in the bowl game, the school forfeited the win, though the NCAA does not recognize the forfeit.

== Head coaches ==
- John Brandeberry (1917)
- James Baxter (1918)
- Watt Hobt (1919–1920)
- Joseph Dwyer (1921–1922)
- Pat Dwyer (1923–1925)
- Boni Petcoff (1926–1929)
- Jim Nicholson (1930, 1932–1935)
- No team (1931)
- Clarence Spears (1936–1942)
- No team (1943–1945)
- Bill Orwig (1946–1947)
- Skip Stahley (1948–1949)
- Bob Snyder (1950)
- Don Greenwood (1951)
- Claire Dunn (1951–1953)
- Forrest England (1954–1955)
- Jack Morton (1956)
- Harry Larche (1957–1959)
- Clive Rush (1960–1962)
- Frank Lauterbur (1963–1970)
- John Murphy (1971–1976)
- Chuck Stobart (1977–1981)
- Dan Simrell (1982–1989)
- Nick Saban (1990)
- Gary Pinkel (1991–2000)
- Tom Amstutz (2001–2008)
- Tim Beckman (2009–2011)
- Matt Campbell (2011–2015)
- Jason Candle (2015–2025)
- Mike Jacobs (2026–present)

== Home venues ==
- Scott High School Waite (H.S.) Bowl Armory Park (1918–1922)
- University Stadium (Scott Park) (1923–1931)
- St. John Field (1932–1933)
- Swayne Field (1934–1935, 1942) UT played five of six home games at Swayne Field in an effort to conserve fuel for the war effort.
- Libbey High School (1936)
- Glass Bowl (1937–present)

Other Football Facilities:

- Fetterman Training Center (2010–present) Indoor multi-use athletics facility, including a 100-yard Field Turf playing surface.
- Larimer Athletic Complex (1991–present) Locker rooms, meeting rooms, weight rooms, and offices for Rocket football and athletic department.

== Rivalries ==
=== Bowling Green ===
Toledo and Bowling Green have a rivalry, nicknamed "The Battle of I-75", dating back to 1924, when BGSU challenged the participation of Toledo's captain, Gilbert Stick, after it was discovered that Stick also played for a local team in Genoa, Ohio. Conference rules did not prohibit such play, and BGSU's protest was overruled. In 1950, Toledo's athletic director charged BGSU students a higher price for tickets at a basketball game than the general public, while rumors spread of a dog-napping attempt by BGSU against Toledo's mascot. Another incident came in 1951, when a fight broke out after a hard hit by a BGSU player on fullback Mel Triplett. Don Greenwood, then Toledo's coach, participated, and resigned after the university failed to back him up. In Greenwood's view, the officials should have called a penalty for excessive roughness, and he had a duty to protect his players. As of the 2026 series matchup, Toledo leads 44–43–4.

=== Western Michigan ===
The Western Michigan and Toledo Rockets football rivalry is a significant one within the Mid-American Conference (MAC).

== Retired numbers ==
Four players in the history of the University of Toledo have had their jersey numbers retired.

Toledo Rockets retired numbers
| No. | Player | Pos. | Tenure |
|---|---|---|---|
| 16 | Chuck Ealey | QB | 1969–1971 |
| 18 | Gene Swick | QB | 1972–1975 |
| 82 | Mel Triplett | RB | 1951–1954 |
| 77 | Mel Long | DT | 1969–1971 |

== Future non-conference opponents ==
Announced schedules as of September 17, 2026.

| 2026 | 2027 | 2028 | 2029 | 2030 | 2031 | 2032 | 2033 | 2034 |
|---|---|---|---|---|---|---|---|---|
| at Michigan State | Youngstown State | Memphis | at Maryland | Marshall | at Marshall | at Kentucky | Youngstown State | at Tulsa |
| Central Connecticut | at Memphis | at San Jose State | Rice | at Pittsburgh | at Rice | at Temple | at Marshall | |
| Temple | New Haven | Appalachian State | Syracuse | at Appalachian State | Washington State | Marshall | | |
| San Diego State | at Utah State | | | | | | | |
