= Bowling Green–Toledo football rivalry =

American college football rivalry

Battle of I-75

- Bowling Green Falcons Toledo Rockets
- First meeting: October 3, 1919; Toledo, 6–0
- Latest meeting: November 20, 2026; Toledo, 19–0
- Next meeting: 2027
- Trophy: Battle of I-75 Trophy

Statistics
- Total meetings: 91
- All-time series: Toledo leads 44–43–4
- Largest victory: Toledo, 63–0 (1935)
- Longest win streak: Bowling Green, 12 (1955–1966)
- Current win streak: Toledo, 1 (2026–present)

Locations of Bowling Green and Toledo

The Bowling Green–Toledo football rivalry is an annual college football rivalry game between Mid-American Conference members Bowling Green State University (BGSU) and the University of Toledo (UT). The universities are separated by about 25 miles (40 km) along Interstate 75 (I-75). The Bowling Green Falcons and Toledo Rockets have exchanged two traveling trophies; the Peace Pipe Trophy (1980–2010), and the Battle of I-75 Trophy (2011–present). The series is currently lead by Toledo, 44–43–4.

== History ==
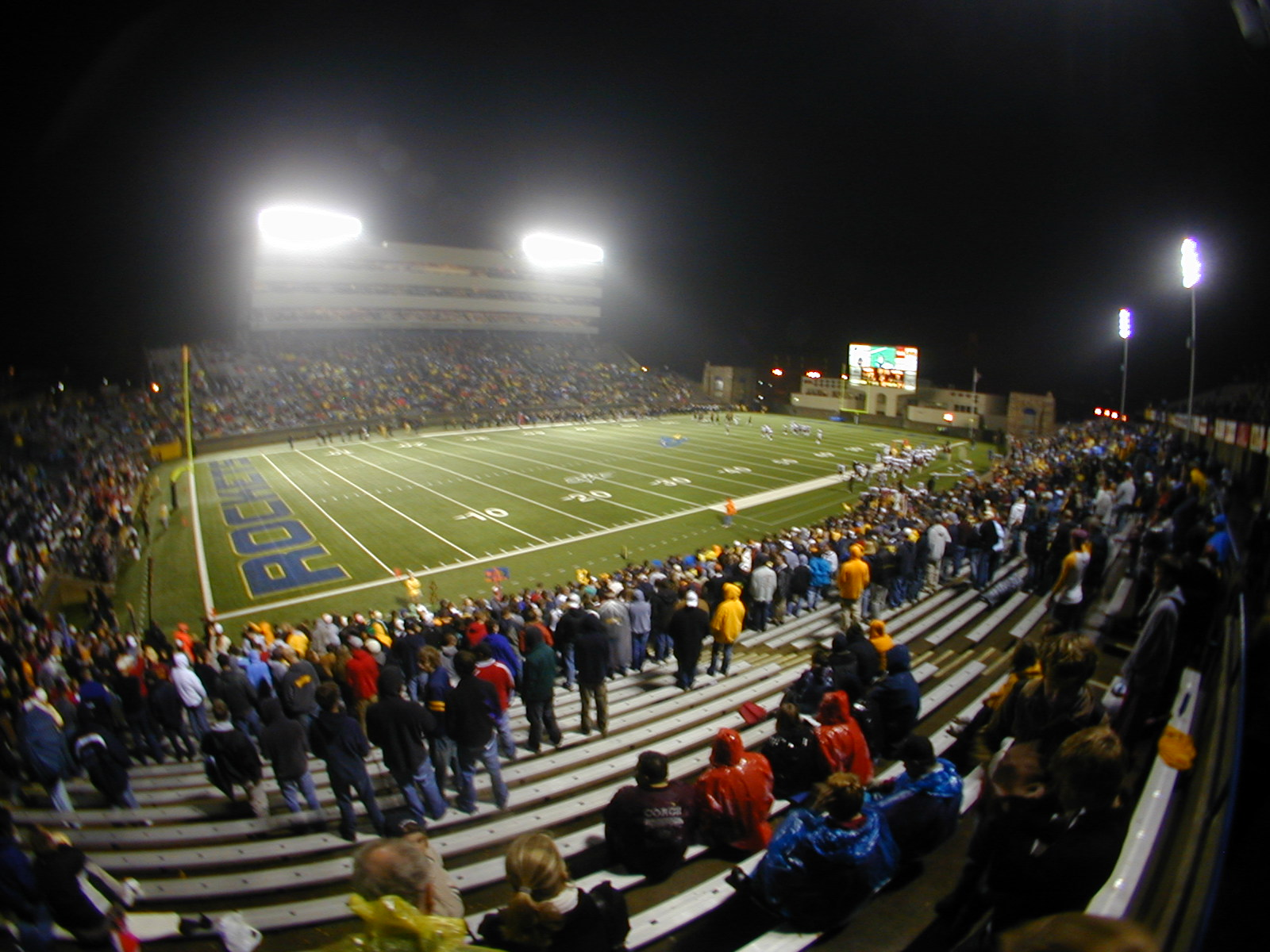
The Glass Bowl, home to the Rockets since 1937

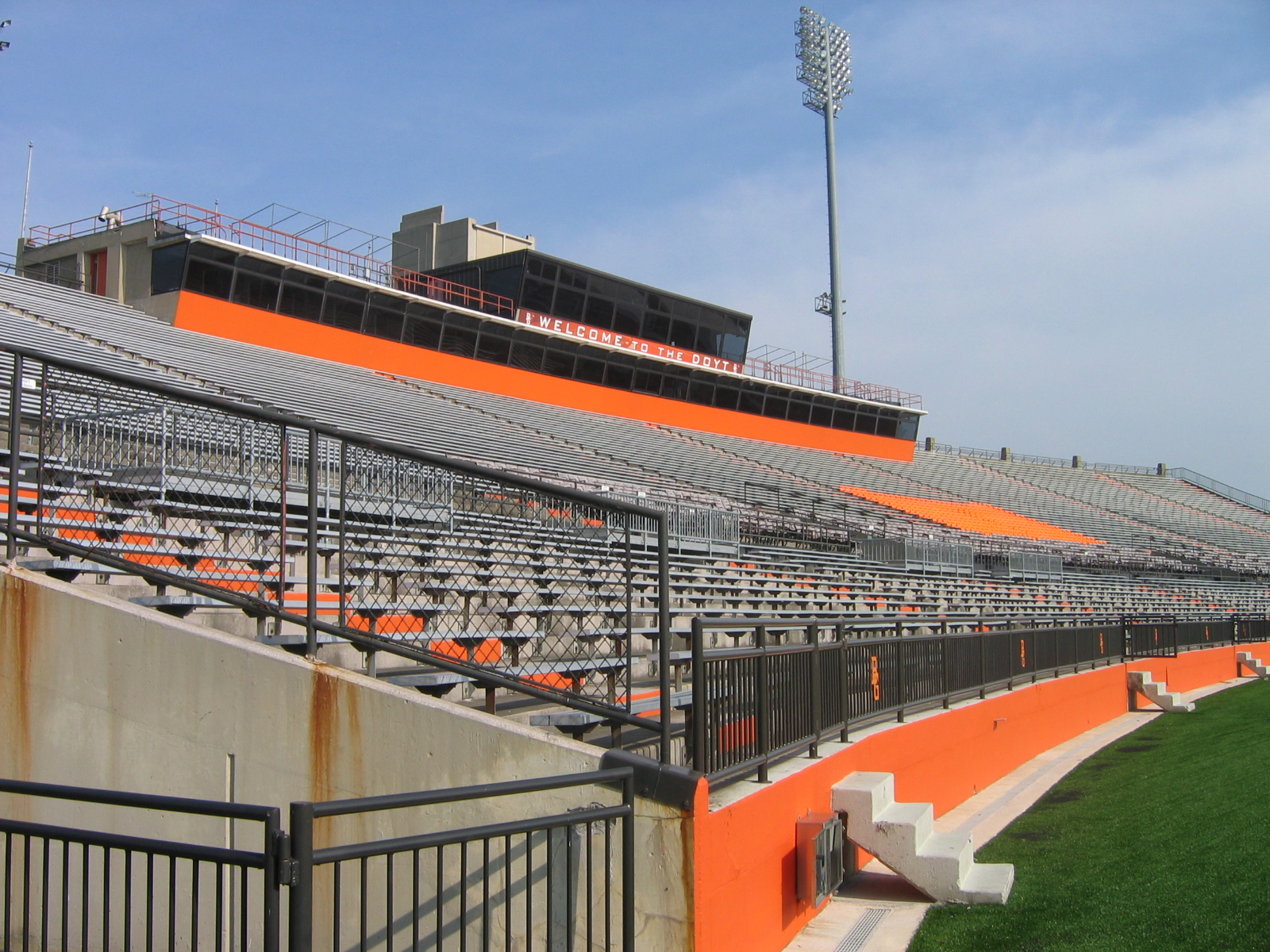
Doyt Perry Stadium, home to the Falcons since 1966

The game is sometimes referred to as The Black Swamp Showdown and the Battle of I-75, as the cities of Toledo and Bowling Green are both located on I-75, just 20 miles (32 km) apart, and in the Black Swamp area of Northwest Ohio.

== Traveling trophies ==
=== Peace Pipe Trophy ===
In 1980, a scale-down replica was fashioned and placed on top of a trophy created by former UT football player Frank Kralik. The Peace Pipe Trophy is a miniature replica of an American Indian sacred ceremonial pipe, sitting atop a trophy with both football teams' logos. Kralik donated the trophy to the university to be given to the winner of each year's football game, which like many other college football rivalries is usually the last game of the regular season for both teams. Though the two schools play in different divisions in the Mid-American Conference, they have yet to meet in the MAC Championship Game.

The awarding of the Peace Pipe Trophy was discontinued after the 2010 game. The schools agreed to change the trophy after conversations with members of the American Indian community. Taken into consideration was the spiritual symbolism of the ceremonial pipe to the American Indian community, as well as the NCAA's push to remove inappropriate American Indian nicknames and symbols associated with member's athletic teams. The Peace Pipe Trophy will be permanently housed in the Toledo football trophy case as the Rockets won the last battle for the Peace Pipe in 2010.

=== Battle of I-75 Trophy ===
Beginning in 2011, the two schools started playing for the Battle of I-75 Trophy. Sponsored by Fremont Federal Credit Union, it replaced the Peace Pipe Trophy. The Battle of I-75 Trophy was designed by Jeff Artz, who also designed the Fred Biletnikoff Award (awarded to America's top college football wide receiver).

=== Broken Toledo Win Streak (2010-2018) and Falcons Flip The Series (2019-present) ===
Toledo won nine straight games from 2010 to 2018. The 2017 contest was, "a snoozer” as they blew out the Falcons 66–37 before a crowd that barely dented the Doyt’s capacity. Coaches on both teams agreed, "the fiercest and most-heated rivalry in the Mid-American Conference has lost some luster, and that's probably because of the lopsidedness". However, in 2019, on the 100th anniversary of the rivalry, Toledo's streak ended as Bowling Green, a 26-point underdog, defeated the Rockets. The Falcons coached by first-year Head Coach Scot Loeffler dominated all game. Walk-on Grant Loy got his first career start at QB, rushing for 137 yards and a TD while throwing for another. The Falcons Defense led by Brandon Perce held the dominant Toledo offense to only 7 points as the Falcons won 20–7. Toledo resumed their winning ways in 2020 and 2021, then the Falcons won 3 out of 4 from 2022-2025 to tie the series again. Having taken 4 of the past 7 matchups, Bowling Green had officially turned the tide back in their favor after the long Toledo streak in the 2010s.

== Notable games ==
=== (2000–present): ===
- 2001 – Bowling Green scored a series-record 56 points in a 56–21 victory. Quarterback Josh Harris completed 17 of 28 passes for 268 yards and four touchdowns and rushed for 117 yards and two touchdowns. Robert Redd had a game-high six receptions for 127 yards and two touchdowns.
- 2005 – Toledo defeated Bowling Green 44–41 in double overtime on a 22-yard touchdown pass from quarterback Bruce Gradkowski to Chris Hopkins. Gradkowski completed 23 of 36 passes for 298 yards and four touchdowns.
- 2010 – Toledo and Bowling Green met in the first primetime game in series history, with the game broadcast nationally on ESPN2 from the Glass Bowl. Toledo entered the game 6–4, while Bowling Green was 2–8. The Rockets defeated the Falcons 33–14, outgaining them 537–254. Toledo forced five turnovers, including three fumbles and two interceptions, and took a 26–7 halftime lead.
- 2013 – Toledo jumped out to a 21–0 lead, but Bowling Green rallied with 25 unanswered points to take a 25–21 lead in the fourth quarter. Toledo quarterback Terrance Owens then led a game-winning drive, finding Alonzo Russell for an 11-yard touchdown with 1:22 remaining to give the Rockets a 28–25 victory.
- 2014 – Kareem Hunt rushed for a then career-high 265 yards and two touchdowns on 30 carries as Toledo defeated Bowling Green 27–20. Hunt's 91-yard touchdown run in the third quarter was the third-longest rush in Toledo history at the time, and the victory gave the Rockets their fifth consecutive win in the rivalry.
- 2016 – Toledo defeated Bowling Green 42–35 after the Falcons erased a 35–21 fourth-quarter deficit to tie the game. Kareem Hunt scored the game-winning three-yard touchdown with 18 seconds remaining, giving the Rockets their seventh consecutive victory in the rivalry. The game featured 36 fourth-quarter points.
- 2017 – Toledo scored a series-record 66 points, surpassing its previous high of 63 in a 1935 shutout, en route to a 66–37 victory over Bowling Green. It was Toledo's eighth consecutive win in the rivalry. The 103 combined points were also a series record. Toledo running back Shakif Seymour tied the school record with five rushing touchdowns, while Terry Swanson rushed for a career-high 192 yards. Quarterback Logan Woodside threw for 232 yards and two touchdowns and broke Toledo's career record for touchdown passes during the game.
- 2022 – Barstool College Football Show visited the Glass Bowl for the 87th meeting between Toledo and Bowling Green. Dan Katz (also known as "Big Cat") received the key to Toledo from mayor Wade Kapszukiewicz. Bowling Green defeated Toledo 42–35 in snowy conditions, with quarterback Matt McDonald throwing for a career-high 395 yards and four touchdowns. His 42-yard touchdown pass to Ta'ron Keith with nine seconds remaining gave the Falcons the victory, with Keith breaking several tackles on the play.
- 2023 – Bowling Green led 28–10 at halftime, but Toledo rallied for a 32–31 victory. Quarterback Dequan Finn threw a 59-yard touchdown pass to Jacquez Stuart with 1:22 remaining to give the Rockets the lead and ultimately the victory.
- 2025 – On the 90th edition of the Battle of I-75 was played before a sold-out crowd at Doyt L. Perry Stadium in Bowling Green, Ohio. Toledo took a 21–0 lead, but Bowling Green rallied for a 28–23 victory, scoring 28 unanswered points for the largest comeback in program history. The victory was Eddie George's first in the rivalry as Bowling Green's head coach.

== Statistics ==
	Bowling Green	Toledo
Games played	90	
Wins	43	43
Ties	4	
Home wins	23	25
Road wins	20	18
Consecutive wins	12	9
Most total points in a game	103	
Most points in a win	56	66
Most points in a loss	41	35
Fewest total points in a game	0	
Largest margin of victory	39	63
Smallest margin of victory	1	1
Total points scored in series	1,910	1,930
Shut-outs of opposing team	5	6
Source: "Bowling Green Falcons vs. Toledo Rockets football series history". Winsipedia.

== Game results ==
Bowling Green victories	Toledo victories	Tie games

No.	Date	Location	Winner	Score
1	October 3, 1919	Bowling Green	Toledo	6–0
2	October 29, 1921	Toledo	Bowling Green	20–7
3	November 4, 1922	Bowling Green	Tie	6–6
4	October 27, 1923	Toledo	Toledo	27–0
5	October 25, 1924	Toledo	Toledo	12–7
6	October 20, 1928	Bowling Green	Bowling Green	14–0
7	October 26, 1929	Toledo	Tie	0–0
8	November 1, 1930	Bowling Green	Tie	0–0
9	November 5, 1932	Bowling Green	Bowling Green	12–6
10	October 28, 1933	Toledo	Toledo	26–7
11	November 3, 1934	Bowling Green	Toledo	22–0
12	November 2, 1935	Toledo	Toledo	63–0
13	October 9, 1948	Toledo	Bowling Green	21–6
14	October 8, 1949	Toledo	Toledo	20–19
15	October 28, 1950	Toledo	Bowling Green	39–14
16	October 27, 1951	Bowling Green	Toledo	12–6
17	October 25, 1952	Toledo	Bowling Green	29–19
18	October 24, 1953	Bowling Green	Toledo	20–19
19	October 23, 1954	Toledo	Toledo	38–7
20	October 22, 1955	Bowling Green	Bowling Green	39–0
21	October 20, 1956	Toledo	Bowling Green †	34–12
22	October 19, 1957	Bowling Green	Bowling Green	29–0
23	October 18, 1958	Toledo	Bowling Green	31–16
24	October 17, 1959	Bowling Green	Bowling Green †	51–21
25	October 15, 1960	Toledo	Bowling Green	14–3
26	October 14, 1961	Bowling Green	Bowling Green †	17–6
27	October 13, 1962	Toledo	Bowling Green †	28–13
28	October 19, 1963	Bowling Green	Bowling Green	22–20
29	October 17, 1964	Toledo	Bowling Green †	31–14
30	October 16, 1965	Bowling Green	Bowling Green †	21–14
31	October 15, 1966	Toledo	Bowling Green	14–13
32	October 14, 1967	Bowling Green	Toledo †	33–0
33	October 12, 1968	Toledo	Tie	0–0
34	October 11, 1969	Bowling Green	Toledo †	27–26
35	October 10, 1970	Toledo	Toledo †	20–0
36	October 9, 1971	Bowling Green	#20 Toledo †	24–7
37	October 7, 1972	Toledo	Bowling Green	19–8
38	October 6, 1973	Bowling Green	Bowling Green	49–35
39	October 5, 1974	Toledo	Toledo	24–19
40	October 11, 1975	Bowling Green	Bowling Green	34–17
41	October 9, 1976	Toledo	Bowling Green	29–28
42	October 8, 1977	Bowling Green	Bowling Green	21–13
43	October 7, 1978	Toledo	Bowling Green	45–27
44	October 6, 1979	Bowling Green	Toledo	23–17
45	October 11, 1980	Toledo	Bowling Green	17–6
46	October 24, 1981	Bowling Green	Bowling Green	38–0
47	October 23, 1982	Toledo	Toledo	24–10

No.	Date	Location	Winner	Score
48	October 8, 1983	Bowling Green	Toledo	6–3
49	October 6, 1984	Toledo	Toledo †	17–6
50	November 11, 1985	Bowling Green	Bowling Green †	21–0
51	November 15, 1986	Toledo	Toledo	22–3
52	October 17, 1987	Bowling Green	Bowling Green	20–6
53	September 24, 1988	Toledo	Toledo	34–5
54	October 14, 1989	Bowling Green	Bowling Green	27–23
55	October 13, 1990	Toledo	Toledo †	19–13
56	October 19, 1991	Bowling Green	Bowling Green †	24–21
57	October 17, 1992	Toledo	Bowling Green †	10–9
58	October 2, 1993	Bowling Green	Bowling Green	17–10
59	October 15, 1994	Toledo	Bowling Green	31–16
60	October 21, 1995	Bowling Green	Toledo †	35–16
61	October 5, 1996	Toledo	Toledo	24–16
62	October 25, 1997	Bowling Green	#24 Toledo ‡	35–20
63	October 17, 1998	Toledo	Toledo ‡	24–16
64	October 2, 1999	Bowling Green	Bowling Green	34–23
65	November 22, 2000	Toledo	Toledo	51–17
66	November 23, 2001	Bowling Green	Bowling Green	56–21
67	November 30, 2002	Toledo	Toledo ‡	42–24
68	November 29, 2003	Bowling Green	#22 Bowling Green ‡	31–23
69	November 23, 2004	Toledo	Toledo †	49–41
70	November 22, 2005	Bowling Green	Toledo	44–41
71	November 21, 2006	Toledo	Toledo	31–21
72	November 23, 2007	Bowling Green	Bowling Green	37–10
73	November 28, 2008	Toledo	Bowling Green	38–10
74	November 27, 2009	Bowling Green	Bowling Green	38–24
75	November 17, 2010	Toledo	Toledo	33–14
76	October 15, 2011	Bowling Green	Toledo	28–21
77	September 15, 2012	Toledo	Toledo	27–15
78	October 26, 2013	Bowling Green	Toledo	28–25
79	November 19, 2014	Toledo	Toledo	27–20
80	November 17, 2015	Bowling Green	Toledo	44–28
81	October 15, 2016	Toledo	Toledo	42–35
82	November 15, 2017	Bowling Green	Toledo †	66–37
83	October 6, 2018	Toledo	Toledo	52–36
84	October 12, 2019	Bowling Green	Bowling Green	20–7
85	November 4, 2020	Toledo	Toledo	38–3
86	November 10, 2021	Bowling Green	Toledo	49–17
87	November 15, 2022	Toledo	Bowling Green	42–35
88	November 14, 2023	Bowling Green	Toledo ‡	32–31
89	October 26, 2024	Toledo	Bowling Green	41–26
90	October 11, 2025	Bowling Green	Bowling Green	28–23
91	November 20, 2026	Toledo	Toledo	19–0
Series: Toledo leads 44–43–4
†Eventual MAC Champions ‡Lost in MAC Championship Game (1997–present)

== See also ==
- List of NCAA college football rivalry games
