= Bluffton Beavers football =

- First season: 1913; 113 years ago
- Athletic director: Phill Talavinia
- Head coach: Chris Hedden; 1st season, 5–5 (.500)
- Location: Bluffton, Ohio
- Stadium: Dwight Salzman Stadium (capacity: 3,000)
- Conference: HCAC
- Colors: Royal purple and white
- Website: blufftonbeavers.com

The Bluffton Beavers football program represents Bluffton University in college football as a member of the Heartland Collegiate Athletic Conference (HCAC), affiliated with the NCAA Division III. The Beavers' colors are royal purple and white. The games are played at Dwight Salzman Stadium, which seats over 3,000 spectators. They have produced two professional football players; Elbert Dubenion played for the Buffalo Bills of the American Football League in the 1960s and Seth Burkholder a 2006 graduate, played for the Pittsburgh Power of the Arena Football League in 2012.

== Postseason appearances ==
=== NAIA Division II playoffs ===
The Beavers have made two appearances in the NAIA Division II playoffs, with a combined record of 1–2.

Year	Round	Opponent	Result
1987	First Round	Geneva	L, 13–16
1988	First Round; Quarterfinals	Cumberlands (KY); Westminster (PA)	W, 30–14; L, 7–40
