= Northwest Ohio League =

Intercollegiate athletic conference (1921–1932)

- Founded: c. 1916 or 1921
- Folded: c. 1934/1935
- Region: Ohio

The Northwest Ohio League (also the Northwestern Ohio Intercollegiate Athletic Association and Little Ohio Conference) was an intercollegiate athletic conference that existed from 1921 to 1932. The conference's members were located in the state of Ohio.

== Members ==
Institution	Location	Founded	Nickname	Joined	Participation	Left	Current conference
Bluffton College	Bluffton, Ohio	1899	Beavers	?	1931–1934	?	HCAC
Bowling Green State College	Bowling Green, Ohio	1910	Falcons	1921	1931–1932	1931	MAC
Cedarville College	Cedarville, Ohio	1887	Yellow Jackets	?	1933–1934	?	NCCAA
University of Dayton	Dayton, Ohio	1850	Flyers	1916		1934/1935	Atlantic 10
Defiance College	Defiance, Ohio	1850	Yellow Jackets	?	1931–1934	?	HCAC
Findlay College	Findlay, Ohio	1882	Oilers		1931–1934	?	HCAC
Toledo University	Toledo, Ohio	1872	Rockets	1921	1931–1932	1932	MAC

== Football champions ==
- 1921 – Bowling Green
- 1922 – Bowling Green
- 1923 – Toledo
- 1924 – Defiance
- 1925 – Bowling Green
- 1926 – Findlay
- 1927 – Toledo
- 1928 – Bowling Green
- 1929 – Bowling Green and Toledo
- 1930 – Findlay
- 1931 – Defiance
- 1932 – Bluffton

== See also ==
- List of defunct college football conferences
