= List of Michigan Collegiate Conference football standings =

This is a list of yearly Michigan Collegiate Conference football standings.

== Standings ==
1927 Michigan Collegiate Conference football standings
	Conf.					Overall
Team	W		L		T	W		L		T
Michigan State Normal $	3	–	0	–	0	8	–	0	–	0
Central Michigan	2	–	1	–	0	7	–	1	–	0
Western State Teachers	1	–	2	–	0	3	–	4	–	0
Detroit City College	0	–	3	–	0	2	–	6	–	0
$ – Conference champion

1928 Michigan Collegiate Conference football standings
	Conf.					Overall
Team	W		L		T	W		L		T
Michigan State Normal $	3	–	0	–	0	7	–	1	–	0
Western State Teachers	2	–	1	–	0	5	–	2	–	0
Central State (MI)	1	–	2	–	0	6	–	3	–	0
Detroit City College	0	–	3	–	0	2	–	5	–	1
$ – Conference champion

1929 Michigan Collegiate Conference football standings
	Conf.					Overall
Team	W		L		T	W		L		T
Michigan State Normal +	2	–	0	–	1	5	–	1	–	2
Western State Teachers +	2	–	0	–	1	5	–	2	–	1
Detroit City College	1	–	2	–	0	2	–	7	–	0
Central State (MI)	0	–	3	–	0	2	–	3	–	2
+ – Conference co-champions

1930 Michigan Collegiate Conference football standings
	Conf.					Overall
Team	W		L		T	W		L		T
Michigan State Normal $	3	–	0	–	0	6	–	1	–	0
Western State Teachers	2	–	1	–	0	5	–	1	–	1
Central State (MI)	1	–	2	–	0	6	–	2	–	0
Detroit City College	0	–	3	–	0	0	–	9	–	0
$ – Conference champion
