= 1929 in Michigan =

- Decades: 1900s; 1910s; 1920s; 1930s; 1940s
- See also: History of Michigan; Historical outline of Michigan; List of years in Michigan; 1929 in the United States

Events from the year 1929 in Michigan.

== Office holders ==
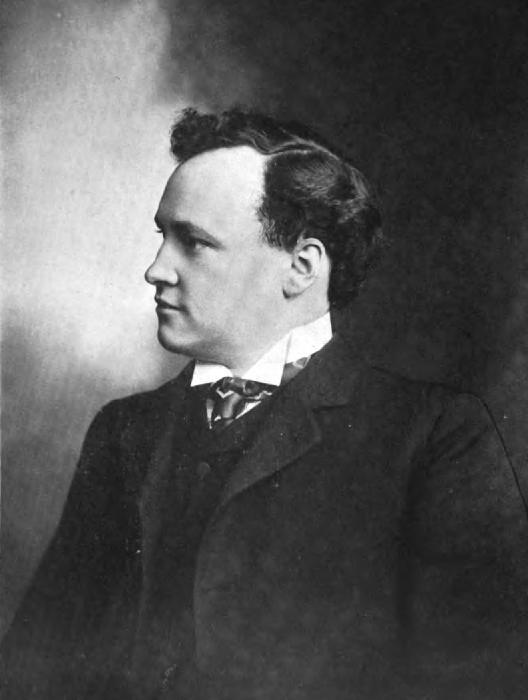
Gov. Fred Green

=== State office holders ===
- Governor of Michigan: Fred W. Green (Republican)
- Lieutenant Governor of Michigan: Luren Dickinson (Republican)
- Michigan Attorney General: Wilber M. Brucker (Republican)
- Michigan Secretary of State: John S. Haggerty (Republican)
- Speaker of the Michigan House of Representatives: Fred R. Ming (Republican)
- Chief Justice, Michigan Supreme Court: Walter Harper North

=== Mayors of major cities ===
- Mayor of Detroit: John C. Lodge
- Mayor of Grand Rapids:
- Mayor of Flint: Ray A. Brownell
- Mayor of Lansing: Laird J. Troyer
- Mayor of Saginaw: Ben N. Mercer
- Mayor of Ann Arbor: Edward W. Staebler

=== Federal office holders ===
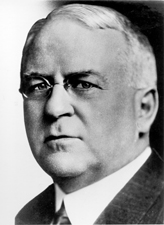
Sen. James Couzens

- U.S. Senator from Michigan: James J. Couzens (Republican)
- U.S. Senator from Michigan: Arthur Vandenberg (Republican)
- House District 1: Robert H. Clancy (Republican)
- House District 2: Earl C. Michener (Republican)
- House District 3: Joseph L. Hooper (Republican)
- House District 4: John C. Ketcham (Republican)
- House District 5: Carl E. Mapes (Republican)
- House District 6: Grant M. Hudson (Republican)
- House District 7: Louis C. Cramton (Republican)
- House District 8: Bird J. Vincent (Republican)
- House District 9: James C. McLaughlin (Republican)
- House District 10: Roy O. Woodruff (Republican)
- House District 11: Frank P. Bohn (Republican)
- House District 12: W. Frank James (Republican)
- House District 13: Clarence J. McLeod (Republican)

== Population ==
In the 1920 United States census, Michigan was recorded as having a population of 3,668,412, ranking as the seventh most populous state in the country. By 1930, Michigan's population had increased by 32.0% to 4,842,325.

=== Cities ===
The following is a list of cities in Michigan with a population of at least 15,000 based on 1920 U.S. Census data. Historic census data from 1910 and 1930 is included to reflect trends in population increases or decreases.

1920 Rank	City	County	1910 Pop.	1920 Pop.	1930 Pop.	Change 1920-30
1	Detroit	Wayne	465,766	993,678	1,568,662	57.9%
2	Grand Rapids	Kent	112,571	137,634	168,592	22.5%
3	Flint	Genesee	38,550	91,599	156,492	70.8%
4	Saginaw	Saginaw	50,510	61,903	80,715	30.4%
5	Lansing	Ingham	31,229	57,327	78,397	36.8%
6	Hamtramck	Wayne	3,559	48,615	56,268	15.7%
7	Kalamazoo	Kalamazoo	39,437	48,487	54,786	13.0%
8	Jackson	Jackson	31,433	48,374	55,187	14.1%
9	Bay City	Bay	45,166	47,554	47,355	−0.4%
10	Highland Park	Wayne	4,120	46,499	52,959	13.9%
11	Muskegon	Muskegon	24,062	36,570	41,390	15.2%
12	Battle Creek	Calhoun	25,267	36,164	45,573	26.0%
13	Pontiac	Oakland	14,532	34,273	64,928	89.4%
14	Port Huron	St. Clair	18,863	25,944	31,361	20.9%
15	Ann Arbor	Washtenaw	14,817	19,516	26,944	38.1%
16	Ironwood	Gogebic	12,821	15,739	14,299	−9.1%

=== Boom cities of the 1920s ===
The 1920s saw an explosion of growth in the population of small cities near Detroit, with some communities growing more than three fold. Dearborn was the most extreme case, growing 20-fold from 2,470 to 50,358 persons.

1920 Rank	City	County	1910 Pop.	1920 Pop.	1930 Pop.	Change 1920-30
	Warren	Macomb	2,346	6,780	24,024	254.3%
	Royal Oak	Oakland	1,071	6,007	22,904	281.3%
	Ferndale	Oakland	--	2,640	20,855	690.0%
	Dearborn	Wayne	911	2,470	50,358	1,938.8%

=== Counties ===
The following is a list of counties in Michigan with populations of at least 40,000 based on 1920 U.S. Census data. Historic census data from 1910 and 1930 are included to reflect trends in population increases or decreases.

1920 Rank	County	Largest city	1910 Pop.	1920 Pop.	1930 Pop.	Change 1920-30
1	Wayne	Detroit	531,591	1,177,645	1,888,946	60.4%
2	Kent	Grand Rapids	159,145	183,041	240,511	31.4%
3	Genesee	Flint	64,555	125,668	211,641	68.4%
4	Saginaw	Saginaw	89,290	100,286	120,717	20.4%
5	Oakland	Pontiac	49,576	90,050	211,251	134.6%
6	Ingham	Lansing	53,310	81,554	116,587	43.0%
7	Calhoun	Battle Creek	56,638	72,918	87,043	19.4%
8	Houghton	Houghton	88,098	71,930	52,851	-26.5%
9	Jackson	Jackson	53,426	72,539	92,304	27.2%
10	Kalamazoo	Kalamazoo	60,327	71,225	91,368	28.3%
11	Bay	Bay City	68,238	69,548	69,474	-0.1%
12	Berrien	Niles	53,622	62,653	81,066	29.4%
13	Muskegon	Muskegon	40,577	62,362	84,630	35.7%
14	St. Clair	Port Huron	52,341	58,009	67,563	16.5%
15	Washtenaw	Ann Arbor	44,714	49,520	65,530	32.3%
16	Lenawee	Adrian	47,907	47,767	49,849	4.4%
17	Ottawa	Holland	45,301	47,660	54,858	15.1%
18	Marquette	Marquette	46,739	45,786	44,076	−3.7%

== Sports ==
=== Baseball ===
- 1929 Detroit Tigers season – Under manager Bucky Harris, the Tigers compiled a 70–84 record and finished in sixth place in the American League. The team's statistical leaders included Harry Heilmann with a .344 batting average, Dale Alexander with 25 home runs and 137 RBIs, and George Uhle with 15 wins and a 4.08 earned run average.

=== American football ===
- 1929 Detroit Titans football team – The Titans compiled a 7–1–1 record under head coach Gus Dorais.
- 1929 Michigan State Normal Hurons football team – Under head coach Elton Rynearson, the Hurons compiled a 5–1–2 record, tied for the Michigan Collegiate Conference championship, and outscored opponents by a combined total of 156 to 45.
- 1929 Western State Hilltoppers football team – In their first season under head coach Mike Gary, the Hilltoppers compiled a 5–2–1 record, tied for the Michigan Collegiate Conference championship, and outscored opponents, 161 to 44.
- 1929 Michigan Wolverines football team – The Wolverines compiled a 5–3–1 record and tied for seventh place in the Big Ten Conference.
- 1929 Michigan State Spartans football team – Under head coach Jim Crowley, the Spartans compiled a 5–3 record.
- 1929 Central State Bearcats football team – Under head coach Butch Nowack, the team compiled a 2–3–2 record and was outscored by a total of 80 to 71.

=== Basketball ===
- 1928–29 Michigan Wolverines men's basketball team – Under head coach George Veenker, the Wolverines compiled a 13–3 record and were co-champions of the Big Ten Conference.

=== Ice hockey ===
- 1928–29 Detroit Cougars season – Under general manager and coach Jack Adams, the Red Wings compiled a 19–16–9 record. The team's statistical leaders included Carson Cooper with 18 goals, 9 assists, and 27 points. Dolly Dolson was the team's goaltender.

== Chronology of events ==
=== May ===
14441 Wilshire, Detroit mich

== Births ==
- January 20 – Arte Johnson in Benton Harbor, Michigan
- April 16 – Dorne Dibble in Adrian, Michigan
- May 16 – Betty Carter in Flint, Michigan
- May 16 – John Conyers in Highland Park, Michigan
- July 20 – Mike Ilitch in Detroit
- September 16 – Dale Kildee in Flint, Michigan
- November 28 – Berry Gordy in Detroit

== Deaths ==
- February 8 – Edwin Denby, 42nd United States Secretary of the Navy, at age 58 in Detroit
- July 19 – Henry McMorran, at age 85 in Port Huron, Michigan

== See also ==
- History of Michigan
- History of Detroit
