= 1918 Marquette Hilltoppers football team =

American college football season

1918 Marquette Hilltoppers football
- Conference: Independent
- Record: 2–0–1
- Head coach: John J. Ryan (2nd season)

1918 Midwestern college football independents records
	Conf.			Overall
Team	W	L	T	W		L		T
Detroit Junior College		–		4	–	0	–	0
Central Michigan		–		1	–	0	–	0
Marquette		–		2	–	0	–	1
Heidelberg		–		5	–	1	–	0
Lincoln (MO)		–		3	–	1	–	0
St. Xavier		–		4	–	1	–	1
Notre Dame		–		3	–	1	–	2
Butler		–		2	–	1	–	1
Western State Normal		–		3	–	2	–	0
Saint Louis		–		3	–	2	–	1
Michigan Agricultural		–		4	–	3	–	0
Akron		–		2	–	2	–	1
St. Mary's (OH)		–		1	–	1	–	0
Toledo		–		1	–	1	–	0
Nebraska		–		2	–	3	–	1
Michigan State Normal		–		1	–	2	–	0
Iowa State Teachers		–		1	–	3	–	0
Wabash		–		1	–	3	–	0
Fairmount		–		1	–	4	–	0
Haskell		–		1	–	4	–	0
Lake Forest		–		0	–	1	–	0
Detroit		–		0	–	2	–	0

The 1918 Marquette Hilltoppers football team was an American football team that represented Marquette University as an independent during the 1918 college football season. In its second season under head coach John J. Ryan, the team compiled a 2–0–1 record.

== Schedule ==
Date	Opponent	Site	Result	Source
November 9	Lawrence	Milwaukee, WI	W 7–0 (forfeit)	
November 16	Ripon	Milwaukee, WI	W 13–6	
November 23	Carroll (WI)	Milwaukee, WI	T 0–0	
