= 1918 Central Michigan Normalites football team =

American college football season

1918 Central Michigan Normalites football
- Conference: Independent
- Record: 1–0
- Head coach: Charles Tambling (5th season)

1918 Midwestern college football independents records
	Conf.			Overall
Team	W	L	T	W		L		T
Detroit Junior College		–		4	–	0	–	0
Central Michigan		–		1	–	0	–	0
Marquette		–		2	–	0	–	1
Heidelberg		–		5	–	1	–	0
Lincoln (MO)		–		3	–	1	–	0
St. Xavier		–		4	–	1	–	1
Notre Dame		–		3	–	1	–	2
Butler		–		2	–	1	–	1
Western State Normal		–		3	–	2	–	0
Saint Louis		–		3	–	2	–	1
Michigan Agricultural		–		4	–	3	–	0
Akron		–		2	–	2	–	1
St. Mary's (OH)		–		1	–	1	–	0
Toledo		–		1	–	1	–	0
Nebraska		–		2	–	3	–	1
Michigan State Normal		–		1	–	2	–	0
Iowa State Teachers		–		1	–	3	–	0
Wabash		–		1	–	3	–	0
Fairmount		–		1	–	4	–	0
Haskell		–		1	–	4	–	0
Lake Forest		–		0	–	1	–	0
Detroit		–		0	–	2	–	0

The 1918 Central Michigan Normalites football team represented Central Michigan Normal School, later renamed Central Michigan University, as an independent during the 1918 college football season. The official 1918 football season was cancelled due to S.A.T.C. rules during World War I and the 1918 flu pandemic. However, a scrub team played one game, a 41-6 victory over Traverse City High School on November 16, 1918. Charles Tambling, who coached the team from 1902 to 1905, returned as head coach in 1918.

== Schedule ==
Date	Opponent	Site	Result
November 16	Traverse City High School	Mount Pleasant, MI	W 41–6
