= 1918 Western State Normal Hilltoppers football team =

American college football season

1918 Western State Normal Hilltoppers football
- Conference: Independent
- Record: 3–2
- Head coach: William H. Spaulding (12th season)
- Captain: Frank Thomas
- Home stadium: Normal field

1918 Midwestern college football independents records
	Conf.			Overall
Team	W	L	T	W		L		T
Detroit Junior College		–		4	–	0	–	0
Central Michigan		–		1	–	0	–	0
Marquette		–		2	–	0	–	1
Heidelberg		–		5	–	1	–	0
Lincoln (MO)		–		3	–	1	–	0
St. Xavier		–		4	–	1	–	1
Notre Dame		–		3	–	1	–	2
Butler		–		2	–	1	–	1
Western State Normal		–		3	–	2	–	0
Saint Louis		–		3	–	2	–	1
Michigan Agricultural		–		4	–	3	–	0
Akron		–		2	–	2	–	1
St. Mary's (OH)		–		1	–	1	–	0
Toledo		–		1	–	1	–	0
Nebraska		–		2	–	3	–	1
Michigan State Normal		–		1	–	2	–	0
Iowa State Teachers		–		1	–	3	–	0
Wabash		–		1	–	3	–	0
Fairmount		–		1	–	4	–	0
Haskell		–		1	–	4	–	0
Lake Forest		–		0	–	1	–	0
Detroit		–		0	–	2	–	0

The 1918 Western State Normal Hilltoppers football team represented Western State Normal School (later renamed Western Michigan University) as an independent during the 1918 college football season. In their 12th season under head coach William H. Spaulding, the Hilltoppers compiled a 3–2 record and outscored their opponents, 223 to 30. The team defeated Hillsdale College, 103 to 0, the largest margin of victory in school history. Quarterback Frank Thomas was the team captain; he later became head coach of the Alabama Crimson Tide football team from 1931 to 1946.

== Schedule ==
Date	Time	Opponent	Site	Result	Source
October 12	2:45 p.m.	Albion	Normal field; Kalamazoo, MI	L 12–14	
November 2		at Michigan Agricultural	College Field; East Lansing, MI	L 7–16	
November 16	1:45 p.m.	Hillsdale	Normal field; Kalamazoo, MI	W 102–0	
November 23	2:00 p.m.	Hope	Normal field; Kalamazoo, MI	W 62–0	
November 30	2:00 p.m.	Notre Dame freshmen	Normal field; Kalamazoo, MI	W 39–0	
All times are in Central time
