= 1918 St. Xavier Saints football team =

American college football season

1918 St. Xavier Saints football
- Conference: Independent
- Record: 4–1–1
- Head coach: Albert B. Lambert (1st season)

1918 Midwestern college football independents records
	Conf.			Overall
Team	W	L	T	W		L		T
Detroit Junior College		–		4	–	0	–	0
Central Michigan		–		1	–	0	–	0
Marquette		–		2	–	0	–	1
Heidelberg		–		5	–	1	–	0
Lincoln (MO)		–		3	–	1	–	0
St. Xavier		–		4	–	1	–	1
Notre Dame		–		3	–	1	–	2
Butler		–		2	–	1	–	1
Western State Normal		–		3	–	2	–	0
Saint Louis		–		3	–	2	–	1
Michigan Agricultural		–		4	–	3	–	0
Akron		–		2	–	2	–	1
St. Mary's (OH)		–		1	–	1	–	0
Toledo		–		1	–	1	–	0
Nebraska		–		2	–	3	–	1
Michigan State Normal		–		1	–	2	–	0
Iowa State Teachers		–		1	–	3	–	0
Wabash		–		1	–	3	–	0
Fairmount		–		1	–	4	–	0
Haskell		–		1	–	4	–	0
Lake Forest		–		0	–	1	–	0
Detroit		–		0	–	2	–	0

The 1918 St. Xavier Musketeers football team was an American football team that represented St. Xavier College (later renamed Xavier University) as an independent during the 1918 college football season. In its first season under head coach Albert B. Lambert, the team compiled a 4–1–1 record and outscored opponents by a total of 93 to 37.

== Schedule ==
Date	Opponent	Site	Result	Source
November 2	Hanover		W 10–7	
November 9	Kentucky Military Institute		W 48–0	
	Camp Zachary Taylor		W 26–12	
November 23	Transylvania	Cincinnati, OH	W 3–0	
November 28	Fort Thomas (KY)		T 6–6	
December 7	at Cincinnati	Carson Field; Cincinnati, OH (rivalry)	L 0–12	
