= 1918 Michigan State Normal Normalites football team =

American college football season

1918 Michigan State Normal Normalites football
- Conference: Independent
- Record: 1–2
- Head coach: Lynn Bell (1st season)
- Captain: Malcolm J. MacGregor

1918 Midwestern college football independents records
	Conf.			Overall
Team	W	L	T	W		L		T
Detroit Junior College		–		4	–	0	–	0
Central Michigan		–		1	–	0	–	0
Marquette		–		2	–	0	–	1
Heidelberg		–		5	–	1	–	0
Lincoln (MO)		–		3	–	1	–	0
St. Xavier		–		4	–	1	–	1
Notre Dame		–		3	–	1	–	2
Butler		–		2	–	1	–	1
Western State Normal		–		3	–	2	–	0
Saint Louis		–		3	–	2	–	1
Michigan Agricultural		–		4	–	3	–	0
Akron		–		2	–	2	–	1
St. Mary's (OH)		–		1	–	1	–	0
Toledo		–		1	–	1	–	0
Nebraska		–		2	–	3	–	1
Michigan State Normal		–		1	–	2	–	0
Iowa State Teachers		–		1	–	3	–	0
Wabash		–		1	–	3	–	0
Fairmount		–		1	–	4	–	0
Haskell		–		1	–	4	–	0
Lake Forest		–		0	–	1	–	0
Detroit		–		0	–	2	–	0

The 1918 Michigan State Normal Normalites football team was an American football team that represented Michigan State Normal College (later renamed Eastern Michigan University) as an independent during the 1918 college football season. In their first and only season under head coach Lynn Bell, the Normalites compiled a 1–2 record and were outscored by a total of 31 to 26. Malcolm J. MacGregor was the team captain. The season was abbreviated due to the Spanish flu pandemic.

== Schedule ==
Date	Opponent	Site	Result	Source
October 19	Albion	Ypsilanti, MI	Cancelled	
November 2	at Detroit Junior College	Goldberg Field; Detroit, MI	L 0–18	
November	at Assumption (ON)			
November	at U-M Army Corps		L 6–7	
November 23	Hillsdale	Ypsilanti, MI	W 20–6	
