= 1918 Haskell Indians football team =

American college football season

1918 Haskell Indians football
- Conference: Independent
- Record: 1–4
- Head coach: Bud Saunders (1st season)
- Home stadium: Haskell Field

1918 Midwestern college football independents records
	Conf.			Overall
Team	W	L	T	W		L		T
Detroit Junior College		–		4	–	0	–	0
Central Michigan		–		1	–	0	–	0
Marquette		–		2	–	0	–	1
Heidelberg		–		5	–	1	–	0
Lincoln (MO)		–		3	–	1	–	0
St. Xavier		–		4	–	1	–	1
Notre Dame		–		3	–	1	–	2
Butler		–		2	–	1	–	1
Western State Normal		–		3	–	2	–	0
Saint Louis		–		3	–	2	–	1
Michigan Agricultural		–		4	–	3	–	0
Akron		–		2	–	2	–	1
St. Mary's (OH)		–		1	–	1	–	0
Toledo		–		1	–	1	–	0
Nebraska		–		2	–	3	–	1
Michigan State Normal		–		1	–	2	–	0
Iowa State Teachers		–		1	–	3	–	0
Wabash		–		1	–	3	–	0
Fairmount		–		1	–	4	–	0
Haskell		–		1	–	4	–	0
Lake Forest		–		0	–	1	–	0
Detroit		–		0	–	2	–	0

The 1918 Haskell Indians football team was an American football team that represented the Haskell Indian Institute (now known as Haskell Indian Nations University) as an independent during the 1918 college football season. Practice started during the first week of September. In its first season under head coach J. E. Saunders, Haskell compiled a 1–4 record.

As of the fall of 1918, the Haskell Institute had 832 students. The 1918 Spanish flu pandemic struck the Haskell campus. By early November, 326 cases were reported with a total of seven deaths.

== Schedule ==
Date	Opponent	Site	Result	Source
September 28	Ottawa		Cancelled	
October 5	at Oklahoma A&M	Lewis Field; Stillwater, OK	L 6–19	
October 19	Camp Funston			
November 9	at Creighton	Creighton Field; Omaha, NE	L 7–34	
November 23	Midland	Haskell Field; Lawrence, KS	W 41–3	
November 30	at Washburn	Washburn Field; Topeka, KS	L 7–32	
