= 1918 Lincoln Tigers football team =

American college football season

1918 Lincoln Tigers football
- Conference: Independent
- Record: 3–1
- Head coach: S. L. Burlong (1st season)
- Captains: Charles Gruber; L. E. Watson; R. H. Smith

1918 Midwestern college football independents records
	Conf.			Overall
Team	W	L	T	W		L		T
Detroit Junior College		–		4	–	0	–	0
Central Michigan		–		1	–	0	–	0
Marquette		–		2	–	0	–	1
Heidelberg		–		5	–	1	–	0
Lincoln (MO)		–		3	–	1	–	0
St. Xavier		–		4	–	1	–	1
Notre Dame		–		3	–	1	–	2
Butler		–		2	–	1	–	1
Western State Normal		–		3	–	2	–	0
Saint Louis		–		3	–	2	–	1
Michigan Agricultural		–		4	–	3	–	0
Akron		–		2	–	2	–	1
St. Mary's (OH)		–		1	–	1	–	0
Toledo		–		1	–	1	–	0
Nebraska		–		2	–	3	–	1
Michigan State Normal		–		1	–	2	–	0
Iowa State Teachers		–		1	–	3	–	0
Wabash		–		1	–	3	–	0
Fairmount		–		1	–	4	–	0
Haskell		–		1	–	4	–	0
Lake Forest		–		0	–	1	–	0
Detroit		–		0	–	2	–	0

The 1918 Lincoln Tigers football team represented Lincoln Institute—now known as Lincoln University—in Jefferson City, Missouri as an independent during the 1918 college football season. The Lincoln Institute Tigers were coached by Professor S. L. Burlong during this season. This was either his first or second season with the team, succeeding coach Romeo West. The team was first captained by Charles Gruber and he led his team practices. On one occasion he held practice during a "sham (reenactment) battle" between the local troopers and the Chamois Company of Home Guards Labor.

The Lincoln Tigers played at least four games this season, and possibly five or more. Lincoln fielded a very competitive team this season under head coach S. L. Burlong. Burlong reportedly had a reputation as one of the premier football coaches in the country, and the players of the 1918 team were regarded as some of the best athletes in the entire United states.

== Schedule ==
Date	Opponent	Site	Result	Source
November 8	at George R. Smith	Sedalia, MO	W 23–0	
November 16	Fulton	Institute grounds; Jefferson City, MO	W 17–0	
November 30	George R. Smith	Institute grounds; Jefferson City, MO	W 45–0	
December 6	at Lincoln High School	Association Park; Kansas City, MO	L 6–13	

== Roster ==
Name	Position
Charles Gruber	Captain
L. E. Watson	Captain - WR/DB
R. H. Smith	Captain - QB/K
L. T. Martin	
L. G. Moore	
C. Lane	
R. G. Mansen	
R. T. Brooks	
R. E. Rankens	
Q. Jackson	WR
L. H. Pearly	
F. B. Riggs	
