= 1918 Detroit Tigers football team =

American college football season

1918 Detroit Tigers football
- Conference: Independent
- Record: 0–2
- Head coach: None

1918 Midwestern college football independents records
	Conf.			Overall
Team	W	L	T	W		L		T
Detroit Junior College		–		4	–	0	–	0
Central Michigan		–		1	–	0	–	0
Marquette		–		2	–	0	–	1
Heidelberg		–		5	–	1	–	0
Lincoln (MO)		–		3	–	1	–	0
St. Xavier		–		4	–	1	–	1
Notre Dame		–		3	–	1	–	2
Butler		–		2	–	1	–	1
Western State Normal		–		3	–	2	–	0
Saint Louis		–		3	–	2	–	1
Michigan Agricultural		–		4	–	3	–	0
Akron		–		2	–	2	–	1
St. Mary's (OH)		–		1	–	1	–	0
Toledo		–		1	–	1	–	0
Nebraska		–		2	–	3	–	1
Michigan State Normal		–		1	–	2	–	0
Iowa State Teachers		–		1	–	3	–	0
Wabash		–		1	–	3	–	0
Fairmount		–		1	–	4	–	0
Haskell		–		1	–	4	–	0
Lake Forest		–		0	–	1	–	0
Detroit		–		0	–	2	–	0

The 1918 Detroit Tigers football team was an American football team that represented the University of Detroit in the 1918 college football season. The team compiled a 0–2 record and was outscored by its opponents by a combined total of 19 to 2.

The 1918 team played in a season shortened by World War I travel restrictions and the 1918 flu pandemic. Games scheduled for the month of October were cancelled due to travel and other restrictions imposed by the United States Department of War. Teams were permitted to play two games in November, though restrictions remained on games that required travel of long distances.

James F. Duffy, head coach of the 1917 team, missed the 1918 season due to wartime military service. In the spring of 1918, Duffy enlisted in the United States Navy. As a result, the University of Detroit football team played the 1918 season without a coach. Duffy returned for the 1919 season.

== Schedule ==
Date	Opponent	Site	Result	Source
November 16	at Albion	Alumni field; Albion, MI	L 2–13	
November 28	at Detroit Junior College	Goldberg Field; Detroit, MI	L 0–6	

== Game summaries ==
=== At Albion ===
On November 16, 1918, the University of Detroit football team lost by a 13–2 score to Albion at Alumni field in Albion, Michigan. The game was played in the rain and on a muddy field. Two Detroit players sustained broken bones in the game and were taken to the hospital. The University of Detroit played only two games against Albion. Albion won the 1918 game, and Detroit won the other game, played in 1930, by a 51–0 score.

=== At Detroit Junior College ===
On Thanksgiving Day (November 28), the University of Detroit team lost by a 6–0 score to Detroit Junior College (DJC) at Goldberg field in Detroit. DJC's captain and fullback, Wayne Brenkert, scored the game's only points on a 30-yard touchdown run in the first quarter. DJC became Wayne University. The schools did not meet again until 1940. Thereafter, they met another 10 times, but the 1918 game remained the only victory by a DJC/Wayne squad.
