= 1918 Wabash Little Giants football team =

American college football season

1918 Wabash Little Giants football
- Conference: Independent
- Record: 1–3
- Head coach: J. Russell Townsend (2nd season)
- Home stadium: Ingalls Field

1918 Midwestern college football independents records
	Conf.			Overall
Team	W	L	T	W		L		T
Detroit Junior College		–		4	–	0	–	0
Central Michigan		–		1	–	0	–	0
Marquette		–		2	–	0	–	1
Heidelberg		–		5	–	1	–	0
Lincoln (MO)		–		3	–	1	–	0
St. Xavier		–		4	–	1	–	1
Notre Dame		–		3	–	1	–	2
Butler		–		2	–	1	–	1
Western State Normal		–		3	–	2	–	0
Saint Louis		–		3	–	2	–	1
Michigan Agricultural		–		4	–	3	–	0
Akron		–		2	–	2	–	1
St. Mary's (OH)		–		1	–	1	–	0
Toledo		–		1	–	1	–	0
Nebraska		–		2	–	3	–	1
Michigan State Normal		–		1	–	2	–	0
Iowa State Teachers		–		1	–	3	–	0
Wabash		–		1	–	3	–	0
Fairmount		–		1	–	4	–	0
Haskell		–		1	–	4	–	0
Lake Forest		–		0	–	1	–	0
Detroit		–		0	–	2	–	0

The 1918 Wabash Little Giants football team represented Wabash College as an independent during the 1918 college football season. Led by J. Russell Townsend in his second and inal season as head coach, the Little Giants compiled a record of 1–3.

== Schedule ==
Date	Opponent	Site	Result	Source
October 26	Fort Harrison	Ingalls Field; Crawfordsville, IN	W 21–20	
November 2	Notre Dame	Ingalls Field; Crawfordsville, IN	L 7–66	
November 16	vs. Purdue	Washington Park; Indianapolis, IN	L 6–53	
November 23	DePauw	Ingalls Field; Crawfordsville, IN	L 6–28	
