= Detroit City College Tartars football, 1918–1929 =

American college football team

The Detroit City College Tartars football teams (now known as the Wayne State Warriors) represented Detroit City College (known as Detroit Junior College prior to 1923, now known as Wayne State University) in American football from 1918 to 1929. The 12 seasons covered by this article are the initial years of the Wayne State football program. Highlights of the school's early years of intercollegiate football included the following:

- The 1918 Detroit Junior College football team compiled a perfect season with a 4–0 record while outscoring opponents, 99 to 0. The first game, played on October 5 in Canada, was a 41–0 victory over Assumption College. The first home game, played on November 2, was an 18–0 victory over Michigan State Normal.
- In 1918, David L. Holmes became the school's head coach. He held that position for eleven (11) years through the 1928 season.
- The 1921 Detroit Junior College football team compiled the program's second undefeated season with a 6–0–2 record, including victories over Baldwin–Wallace (28–0), Michigan State Normal (3–0), and Toledo (13–0). They outscored opponents, 165 to 0.
- The 1922 team failed to score a point for four consecutive games from October 14 to November 11.
- The 1923 Detroit City College Tartars football team compiled a 4–3–1 record, including victories over Ferris Institute, Hope College, Grans Rapids Junior College, and Findlay College.
- After compiling a losing record in 1923, the 1925 compiled a 4–3–1 record, including victories over Assumption College, Hope College, Grand Rapids Junior College, and the University of Toledo.
- The teams suffered losing records in 1926 (2–4–1), 1927 (2–6), 1928 (2–5–1), and 1929 (2–7).
- David L. Holmes stepped down as the school's head football coach after the 1928 season. He remained with the school as athletic director and track coach for several decades thereafter.

== 1918 ==
1918 Detroit Junior College football
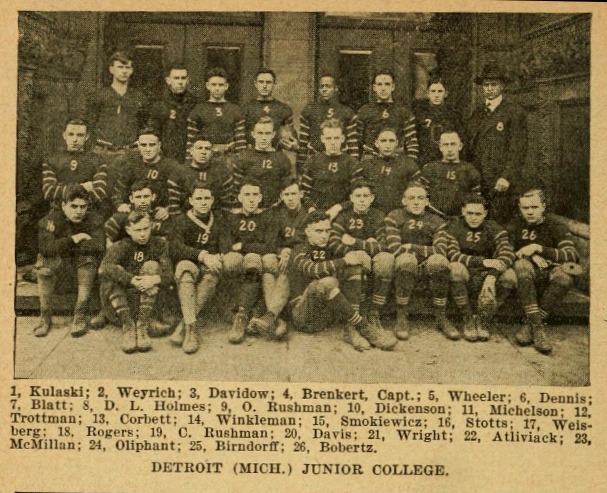
- Conference: Independent
- Record: 4–0
- Head coach: David L. Holmes (1st season)
- Captain: Wayne D. Brenkert
- Home stadium: Goldberg Field

1918 Midwestern college football independents records
	Conf.			Overall
Team	W	L	T	W		L		T
Detroit Junior College		–		4	–	0	–	0
Central Michigan		–		1	–	0	–	0
Marquette		–		2	–	0	–	1
Heidelberg		–		5	–	1	–	0
Lincoln (MO)		–		3	–	1	–	0
St. Xavier		–		4	–	1	–	1
Notre Dame		–		3	–	1	–	2
Butler		–		2	–	1	–	1
Western State Normal		–		3	–	2	–	0
Saint Louis		–		3	–	2	–	1
Michigan Agricultural		–		4	–	3	–	0
Akron		–		2	–	2	–	1
St. Mary's (OH)		–		1	–	1	–	0
Toledo		–		1	–	1	–	0
Nebraska		–		2	–	3	–	1
Michigan State Normal		–		1	–	2	–	0
Iowa State Teachers		–		1	–	3	–	0
Wabash		–		1	–	3	–	0
Fairmount		–		1	–	4	–	0
Haskell		–		1	–	4	–	0
Lake Forest		–		0	–	1	–	0
Detroit		–		0	–	2	–	0

The 1918 Detroit Junior College football team represented Detroit Junior College (later renamed Wayne State University) as an independent during the 1918 college football season. The team was coached by David L. Holmes and compiled a 4–0 record and outscored opponents by a total of 99 to 0. The team was made up of members of the school's Student Army Training Corps.

Two of the victories, including the first in program history, were against Assumption College. The first game was played in Canada, at Windsor, Ontario. Fullback Wayne Brenkert scored three touchdowns in the first game against Assumption. The team also defeated the University of Detroit (on Thanksgiving Day) and Michigan State Normal in the first meetings with each of those two schools. A game with Western State was initially scheduled but cancelled.

The team played its three home games at Goldberg Field, which was located at Ferry Avenue and Hastings Street in Detroit. Wayne considers the 1918 team to be its first intercollegiate football team, though contemporary press accounts also reference a 1917 football team.

Detroit Junior College, the first junior college in the state of Michigan, was established by David D Mackenzie who was the principal of Detroit Central High School. The junior college was located on the campus of the high school, Old Main. Wayne Brenkert played for both Detroit Central High School (winning a High School National Championship in 1915) and Detroit Junior College and is a member of Wayne State University Hall of Fame.

=== Schedule ===
Date	Opponent	Site	Result	Source
October 5	at Assumption (ON)	Windsor, ON	W 41–0	
November 2	Michigan State Normal	Goldberg Field; Detroit, MI	W 18–0	
November 23	Assumption (ON)	Goldberg Field; Detroit, MI	W 35–0	
November 28	Detroit	Goldberg Field; Detroit, MI	W 6–0	

== 1919 ==
1919 Detroit Junior College football
- Conference: Independent
- Record: 3–5
- Head coach: David L. Holmes (2nd season)
- Captain: George Dennis
- Home stadium: Goldberg Field

1919 Midwestern college football independents records
	Conf.			Overall
Team	W	L	T	W		L		T
Notre Dame		–		9	–	0	–	0
Lincoln (MO)		–		3	–	0	–	0
Detroit		–		8	–	1	–	0
Western State Normal		–		4	–	1	–	0
Akron		–		6	–	1	–	1
North Dakota Agricultural		–		5	–	1	–	1
Haskell		–		8	–	2	–	1
Marquette		–		5	–	1	–	2
St. Xavier		–		6	–	2	–	0
Morningside		–		6	–	2	–	0
Heidelberg		–		6	–	3	–	0
Saint Louis		–		4	–	2	–	2
Valparaiso		–		5	–	3	–	0
Wabash		–		4	–	3	–	2
Central Michigan		–		2	–	2	–	3
Michigan Agricultural		–		4	–	4	–	1
Nebraska		–		3	–	3	–	2
St. Mary's (OH)		–		2	–	2	–	0
Iowa State Teachers		–		2	–	4	–	1
Toledo		–		2	–	4	–	0
Butler		–		0	–	5	–	1
Bowling Green		–		0	–	3	–	0

The 1919 Detroit Junior College football team represented Detroit Junior College (later renamed Wayne State University) as an independent during the 1919 college football season. In its second year under head coach David L. Holmes, the team compiled a 3–5 record.

=== Schedule ===
Date	Time	Opponent	Site	Result	Source
September 27		at Alma	Alma, MI	L 0–14	
October 4	2:30 p.m.	at Western State Normal	Normal field; Kalamazoo, MI	L 0–88	
October 11		Adrian	Goldberg Field; Detroit, MI	L 0–20	
November 1		at Assumption (ON)	Windsor, ON	L 0–13	
November 8		Toledo	Goldberg Field; Detroit, MI	W 8–7	
November 15		Central Michigan	Goldberg Field; Detroit, MI	W 42–14	
November 20		Assumption (ON)	Goldberg Field; Detroit, MI	W 20–0	
November 27		Michigan Agricultural freshmen	Goldberg Field; Detroit, MI	L 0–24	

== 1920 ==
1920 Detroit Junior College football
- Conference: Independent
- Record: 5–1–1
- Head coach: David L. Holmes (3rd season)
- Captain: Harold Grant Iler
- Home stadium: Grindley Field

1920 Midwestern college football independents records
	Conf.			Overall
Team	W	L	T	W		L		T
Notre Dame		–		9	–	0	–	0
Michigan Mines		–		2	–	0	–	0
Butler		–		7	–	1	–	0
St. Xavier		–		7	–	1	–	0
Detroit		–		8	–	2	–	0
Marquette		–		7	–	2	–	0
Haskell		–		7	–	2	–	1
St. Ignatius (OH)		–		4	–	2	–	0
Iowa State Teachers		–		4	–	2	–	1
South Dakota State		–		4	–	2	–	1
Indiana State		–		3	–	2	–	0
Valparaiso		–		5	–	3	–	0
Nebraska		–		5	–	3	–	1
Central Michigan		–		4	–	3	–	1
Akron		–		4	–	4	–	0
Wabash		–		3	–	4	–	0
Western State Normal		–		3	–	4	–	0
North Dakota Agricultural		–		2	–	3	–	1
Michigan Agricultural		–		4	–	6	–	0
Earlham		–		2	–	3	–	0
Northern Illinois State		–		3	–	5	–	0
Dayton		–		2	–	4	–	0
Kent State		–		1	–	2	–	0
Saint Louis		–		3	–	6	–	0
Bowling Green		–		1	–	4	–	0
Toledo		–		0	–	3	–	0

The 1920 Detroit Junior College football team represented Detroit Junior College (later renamed Wayne State University) as an independent during the 1920 college football season. In its third year under head coach David L. Holmes, the team compiled a 5–1–1 record.

=== Schedule ===
Date	Opponent	Site	Result	Source
October 9	Toledo	Grindley Field; Detroit, MI	W 14–2	
October 15	Assumption (ON)	Grindley Field; Detroit, MI	W 24–0	
October 30	Ferris Institute	Detroit, MI	W 48–0	
November 6	at Michigan State Normal	Ypsilanti, MI	L 7–21	
November 13	at Grand Rapids	Grand Rapids, MI	W 20–0	
November 20	at Defiance	Defiance, OH	W forfeit	
November 25	Central Michigan	Grindley Field; Detroit, MI	T 6–6	

== 1921 ==
1921 Detroit Junior College football
- Conference: Independent
- Record: 6–0–2
- Head coach: David L. Holmes (4th season)
- Captain: Hazen Dever
- Home stadium: Grindley Field

1921 Midwestern college football independents records
	Conf.			Overall
Team	W	L	T	W		L		T
Detroit Junior College		–		6	–	0	–	2
Notre Dame		–		10	–	1	–	0
Creighton		–		8	–	1	–	0
Detroit		–		8	–	1	–	0
South Dakota State		–		7	–	1	–	0
Kirksville Osteopaths		–		6	–	1	–	0
Iowa State Teachers		–		5	–	1	–	1
Wabash		–		7	–	2	–	0
Central Michigan		–		7	–	2	–	1
Butler		–		6	–	2	–	0
Western State Normal		–		6	–	2	–	0
Marquette		–		6	–	2	–	1
DePauw		–		4	–	3	–	0
Haskell		–		5	–	4	–	0
Michigan Mines		–		1	–	1	–	0
North Dakota Agricultural		–		3	–	3	–	1
Saint Louis		–		4	–	4	–	1
Valparaiso		–		2	–	2	–	1
Michigan Agricultural		–		3	–	5	–	0
Northern Illinois State		–		3	–	5	–	0
Earlham		–		2	–	4	–	1
St. Ignatius (OH)		–		2	–	6	–	0
Dayton		–		1	–	7	–	1
Kent State		–		0	–	2	–	1

The 1921 Detroit Junior College football team represented Detroit Junior College (later renamed Wayne State University) as an independent during the 1921 college football season. In their fourth year under head coach David L. Holmes, the Detroit team compiled a 6–0–2 record, did not allow any of its opponents to score, and outscored all opponents by a combined total of 165 to 0.

The season opener against Assumption College was played in Canada at Sandwich. The Central Michigan game was played on Thanksgiving Day at Grindley Field in Detroit.

On December 9, 1921, the student council held a banquet and dance in honor of the football team for having not allowed a point to be scored against them during the 1921 season.

Hazen Dever was the team captain. Other players included Cameron Cunningham, Jack Duncan, Newman Ertell, Norm Heym, Raymond Humphrey, Harold Grant Iler, Russell Lightbody, Thomas MacKay, and M. Cole Seager, and players with the surnames Allen, Becklein, Boyd, Breslin, Grant, Grove, Johnson, Monihan, Plauman, and Richards. Frank Olney was the manager.

=== Schedule ===
Date	Opponent	Site	Result	Source
September 24	at Assumption (ON)	Windsor, ON	W 26–0	
October 1	Ferris Institute		Cancelled	
October 8	Alma	Grindley Field; Detroit, MI	T 0–0	
October 15	Baldwin–Wallace	Grindley Field; Detroit, MI	W 28–0	
October 29	Michigan State Normal	Grindley Field; Detroit, MI	W 3–0	
November 5	Olivet	Grindley Field; Detroit, MI	W 26–0	
November 12	Grand Rapids	Grindley Field; Detroit, MI	W 39–0	
November 19	at Toledo	Toledo, OH	W 13–0	
November 24	Central Michigan	Grindley Field; Detroit, MI	T 0–0	

== 1922 ==
1922 Detroit Junior College football
- Conference: Independent
- Record: 2–3–2
- Head coach: David L. Holmes (5th season)
- Captain: Cam Cunningham

1922 Midwestern college football independents records
	Conf.			Overall
Team	W	L	T	W		L		T
Western State Normal		–		6	–	0	–	0
Bradley		–		9	–	0	–	1
Marquette		–		8	–	0	–	1
Central Michigan		–		6	–	0	–	2
Notre Dame		–		8	–	1	–	1
Butler		–		8	–	2	–	0
Haskell		–		8	–	2	–	0
Detroit		–		7	–	2	–	1
Michigan Mines		–		1	–	0	–	1
Wabash		–		7	–	3	–	0
St. Ignatius (OH)		–		4	–	1	–	3
Dayton		–		6	–	3	–	0
Saint Louis		–		6	–	3	–	1
Valparaiso		–		3	–	2	–	2
Baldwin–Wallace		–		4	–	3	–	1
DePauw		–		4	–	3	–	2
Michigan Agricultural		–		3	–	5	–	2
Earlham		–		2	–	6	–	0
Kent State		–		0	–	7	–	0

The 1922 Detroit Junior College football team represented Detroit Junior College (later renamed Wayne State University) as an independent during the 1922 college football season. In its fifth year under head coach David L. Holmes, the team compiled a 2–3–2 record.

=== Schedule ===
Date	Opponent	Site	Result	Source
October 7	Ferris Institute		W 19–0	
October 14	at Baldwin–Wallace		L 0–32	
October 28	at Michigan State Normal	Ypsilanti, MI	T 0–0	
November 4	Olivet	Roosevelt Field; Detroit, MI	T 0–0	
November 11	at Grand Rapids		L 0–3	
November 18	Toledo	Roosevelt Field; Detroit, MI	W 6–2	
November 30	Central Michigan	Codd Field; Detroit, MI	L 7–20	

== 1923 ==
1923 Detroit City College Tartars football
- Conference: Independent
- Record: 4–3–1
- Head coach: David L. Holmes (6th season)
- Captain: Al Litzenburger

1923 Midwestern college football independents records
	Conf.			Overall
Team	W	L	T	W		L		T
Marquette		–		8	–	0	–	0
Michigan Mines		–		2	–	0	–	0
Notre Dame		–		9	–	1	–	0
Western State Normal		–		6	–	1	–	1
Haskell		–		11	–	2	–	1
Butler		–		7	–	2	–	0
Central Michigan		–		5	–	1	–	2
Baldwin–Wallace		–		5	–	2	–	1
Cincinnati		–		6	–	3	–	0
Loyola (IL)		–		6	–	3	–	0
Saint Louis		–		5	–	3	–	1
Detroit		–		4	–	3	–	2
Wabash		–		4	–	3	–	2
John Carroll		–		4	–	4	–	1
Valparaiso		–		2	–	2	–	1
Dayton		–		4	–	5	–	0
Michigan Agricultural		–		3	–	5	–	0
Fairmount		–		2	–	4	–	2
Kent State		–		0	–	5	–	0

The 1923 Detroit City College Tartars football team represented Detroit City College (later renamed Wayne State University) as an independent during the 1923 college football season. In their sixth year under head coach David L. Holmes, the Tartars compiled a 4–3–1 record.

=== Schedule ===
Date	Opponent	Site	Result	Source
October 13	Ferris Institute	Roosevelt Field; Detroit, MI	W 54–0	
October 20	Hope	Roosevelt Field; Detroit, MI	W 20–0	
October 27	at Adrian	Adrian, MI	L 0–13	
November 3	Grand Rapids	Detroit, MI	W 42–8	
November 10	at Olivet	Olivet, MI	T 7–7	
November 17	at Toledo	Toledo, OH	L 0–38	
November 24	Findlay	Detroit, MI	W 28–0	
November 29	Central Michigan	Detroit, MI	L 7–21	

== 1924 ==
1924 Detroit City College Tartars football
- Conference: Independent
- Record: 2–5
- Head coach: David L. Holmes (7th season)
- Captain: Willard Bates

The 1924 Detroit City College Tartars football team represented Detroit City College during the 1924 college football season. In their seventh year under head coach David L. Holmes, the Tartars compiled a 2–5 record.

=== Schedule ===
Date	Opponent	Site	Result	Source
October 4	at Assumption (ON)		W 6–0	
October 18	at Olivet		L 14–19	
October 25	Ferris Institute	Detroit, MI	W 3–0	
November 1	Adrian	Detroit, MI	L 6–19	
November 8	at Grand Rapids	Grand Rapids, MI	L 7–10	
November 15	Toledo	Roosevelt Field; Detroit, MI	L 0–27	
November 29	Central Michigan	Codd Field; Detroit, MI	L 6–38	

== 1925 ==
1925 Detroit City College Tartars football
- Conference: Independent
- Record: 4–3–1
- Head coach: David L. Holmes (8th season)
- Captain: Leigh Pascoe
- Home stadium: Codd Field

1925 Midwestern college football independents records
	Conf.			Overall
Team	W	L	T	W		L		T
Northern Illinois State		–		6	–	1	–	0
Dayton		–		7	–	2	–	0
Marquette		–		7	–	2	–	0
Notre Dame		–		7	–	2	–	1
Haskell		–		9	–	3	–	1
Western State Normal		–		6	–	2	–	1
Loyola (IL)		–		6	–	2	–	0
Central Michigan		–		4	–	1	–	3
Adrian		–		6	–	3	–	0
Butler		–		5	–	2	–	2
Michigan Mines		–		2	–	1	–	0
Detroit City College		–		4	–	3	–	1
Detroit		–		5	–	4	–	0
Assumption (ON)		–		3	–	3	–	1
Kent State		–		1	–	1	–	3
Michigan State		–		3	–	5	–	0
Muncie Normal		–		2	–	5	–	0
John Carroll		–		2	–	6	–	1
Saint Louis		–		2	–	6	–	1
Valparaiso		–		1	–	6	–	0

The 1925 Detroit City College Tartars football team represented Detroit City College (later renamed Wayne State University) as an independent during the 1925 college football season. The team compiled a 4–3–1 record and outscored opponents by a total of 118 to 58. Leigh Pascoe was the team captain.

=== Schedule ===
Date	Opponent	Site	Result	Source
October 4	at Ferris Institute	Big Rapids, MI	L 12–13	
October 10	Assumption (ON)	Codd Field; Detroit, MI	W 9–0	
October 17	Olivet	Codd Field; Detroit, MI	T 6–6	
October 24	Hope	Hamilton & Lysander Aves.; Detroit, MI	W 7–0	
November 1	at Adrian	Adrian, MI	L 0–20	
November 8	Grand Rapids	College field; Detroit, MI	W 55–0	
November 14	at Toledo	Toledo, OH	W 23–0	
November 26	Central Michigan	Codd Field; Detroit, MI	L 6–18	

== 1926 ==
1926 Detroit City College Tartars football
- Conference: Independent
- Record: 2–4–1
- Head coach: David L. Holmes (9th season)
- Captain: Art Blum

The 1926 Detroit City College Tartars football team represented Detroit City College as an independent during the 1926 college football season. In their ninth year under head coach David L. Holmes, the Tartars compiled a 2–4-1 record (.

=== Schedule ===
Date	Opponent	Site	Result	Source
October 9	at Assumption (ON)	Windsor, ON	W 7–0	
October 16	Michigan State Normal	College Field; Detroit, MI	L 0–6	
October 23	at Hope	Holland, MI	W 3–0	
October 30	at Hillsdale	Hillsdale, MI	L 0–19	
November 13	Toledo	Detroit, MI	L 7–14	
November 20	Bowling Green	Detroit, MI	T 0–0	
November 25	Central Michigan	Codd Field; Detroit, MI	L 0–9	

== 1927 ==
1927 Detroit City College Tartars football
- Conference: Michigan Collegiate Conference
- Record: 2–6 (0–3 MCC)
- Head coach: David L. Holmes (10th season)
- Captain: Adolph Rehn

1927 Michigan Collegiate Conference football standings
	Conf.					Overall
Team	W		L		T	W		L		T
Michigan State Normal $	3	–	0	–	0	8	–	0	–	0
Central Michigan	2	–	1	–	0	7	–	1	–	0
Western State Teachers	1	–	2	–	0	3	–	4	–	0
Detroit City College	0	–	3	–	0	2	–	6	–	0
$ – Conference champion

The 1927 Detroit City College Tartars football team represented Detroit City College as a member of the Michigan Collegiate Conference (MCC) during the 1927 college football season. In their tenth year under head coach David L. Holmes, the Tartars compiled a 2–6 record (0–3 in conference games) and finished in last place in the MCC.

=== Schedule ===
Date	Opponent	Site	Result	Source
October 7	Assumption (ON)	Detroit, MI	W 13–0	
October 15	at Toledo	Toledo, OH	L 0–13	
October 22	at Bowling Green	Bowling Green, OH	L 0–6	
October 29	at Western State Teachers	Western State Teachers College Field; Kalamazoo, MI	L 0–44	
November 5	at Valparaiso	Valparaiso, IN	W 6–0	
November 12	Hillsdale	Detroit, MI	L 6–22	
November 19	at Michigan State Normal	Normal Field; Ypsilanti, MI	L 0–39	
November 24	Central Michigan	Detroit, MI	L 6–33	

== 1928 ==
1928 Detroit City College Tartars football
- Conference: Michigan Collegiate Conference
- Record: 2–5–1 (0–3 MCC)
- Head coach: David L. Holmes (11th season)
- Captain: Malcolm Stuart

1928 Michigan Collegiate Conference football standings
	Conf.					Overall
Team	W		L		T	W		L		T
Michigan State Normal $	3	–	0	–	0	7	–	1	–	0
Western State Teachers	2	–	1	–	0	5	–	2	–	0
Central State (MI)	1	–	2	–	0	6	–	3	–	0
Detroit City College	0	–	3	–	0	2	–	5	–	1
$ – Conference champion

The 1928 Detroit City College Tartars football team represented Detroit City College as a member of the Michigan Collegiate Conference (MCC) during the 1928 college football season. In their eleventh and final year under head coach David L. Holmes, the Tartars compiled a 2–5–1 record (0–3 in conference games) and finished in last place in the MCC.

=== Schedule ===
Date	Opponent	Site	Result	Source
October 6	at Detroit Junior College freshmen	Detroit, MI	W 24–0	
October 13	at Manchester	North Manchester, IN	T 6–6	
October 20	at Hillsdale	Hillsdale, MI	L 0–12	
October 27	Western State Teachers	Detroit, MI	L 0–45	
November 3	Toledo	Detroit, MI	W 13–6	
November 10	Bowling Green	Detroit, MI	L 0–20	
November 17	Michigan State Normal	Roosevelt Field; Detroit, MI	L 0–55	

== 1929 ==
1929 Detroit City College Tartars football
- Conference: Michigan Collegiate Conference
- Record: 2–7 (1–2 MCC)
- Head coach: Norman G. Wann (1st season)
- Captain: John Boglarsky

1929 Michigan Collegiate Conference football standings
	Conf.					Overall
Team	W		L		T	W		L		T
Michigan State Normal +	2	–	0	–	1	5	–	1	–	2
Western State Teachers +	2	–	0	–	1	5	–	2	–	1
Detroit City College	1	–	2	–	0	2	–	7	–	0
Central State (MI)	0	–	3	–	0	2	–	3	–	2
+ – Conference co-champions

The 1929 Detroit City College Tartars football team represented Detroit City College (later renamed Wayne State University) in the Michigan Collegiate Conference during the 1929 college football season. In its first season under head coach Norman G. Wann, the team compiled a 2–7 record.

=== Schedule ===
Date	Opponent	Site	Result	Attendance	Source
October 5	Olivet	Detroit, MI	L 0–6		
October 12	at Hope	Holland, MI	W 7–0		
October 19	Hillsdale	Detroit, MI	L 0–32		
October 26	at Western State Teachers	Kalamazoo, MI	L 0–40		
November 2	at Wilmington (OH)	Wilmington, OH	L 0–14		
November 9	at Toledo	Toledo, OH	L 0–17		
November 16	at Bowling Green	Bowling Green, OH	L 2–25		
November 23	Michigan State Normal	Detroit, MI	L 0–31		
November 28	Central State (MI)	Central Field; Detroit, MI	W 6–0	3,000	
