= 1918 Saint Louis Billikens football team =

American college football season

1918 Saint Louis Billikens football
- Conference: Independent
- Record: 3–2–1
- Head coach: Ernest C. Quigley (1st season)
- Captain: William S. Higgins
- Home stadium: Sportsman's Park

1918 Midwestern college football independents records
	Conf.			Overall
Team	W	L	T	W		L		T
Detroit Junior College		–		4	–	0	–	0
Central Michigan		–		1	–	0	–	0
Marquette		–		2	–	0	–	1
Heidelberg		–		5	–	1	–	0
Lincoln (MO)		–		3	–	1	–	0
St. Xavier		–		4	–	1	–	1
Notre Dame		–		3	–	1	–	2
Butler		–		2	–	1	–	1
Western State Normal		–		3	–	2	–	0
Saint Louis		–		3	–	2	–	1
Michigan Agricultural		–		4	–	3	–	0
Akron		–		2	–	2	–	1
St. Mary's (OH)		–		1	–	1	–	0
Toledo		–		1	–	1	–	0
Nebraska		–		2	–	3	–	1
Michigan State Normal		–		1	–	2	–	0
Iowa State Teachers		–		1	–	3	–	0
Wabash		–		1	–	3	–	0
Fairmount		–		1	–	4	–	0
Haskell		–		1	–	4	–	0
Lake Forest		–		0	–	1	–	0
Detroit		–		0	–	2	–	0

The 1918 Saint Louis Billikens football team was an American football team that represented Saint Louis University as an independent during the 1918 college football season. In their first and only season under head coach Ernest C. Quigley, the Billikens compiled a 3–2–1 record and outscored opponents by a total of 136 to 36. William S. Higgins was elected captain of the team in December 1917. The Billikens played home games at Sportsman's Park in St. Louis.

== Schedule ==
Date	Time	Opponent	Site	Result	Attendance	Source
October 19		at McKendree	Lebanon, IL	W 79–0		
November 2		Scott Field	Sportsman's Park; St. Louis, MO	W 21–7		
November 9		at DePauw	Greencastle, IN	L 6–10		
November 16		Great Lakes NTS, 15th Regiment Aviation School	Sportsman's Park; St. Louis, MO	T 0–0	5,000	
November 23	2:45 p.m.	Rose Poly	Sportsman's Park; St. Louis, MO	W 30–0		
November 28		at Washington University	Francis Field; St. Louis, MO	L 0–19		
All times are in Central time
