= 1918 Michigan Agricultural Aggies football team =

American college football season

1918 Michigan Agricultural Aggies football
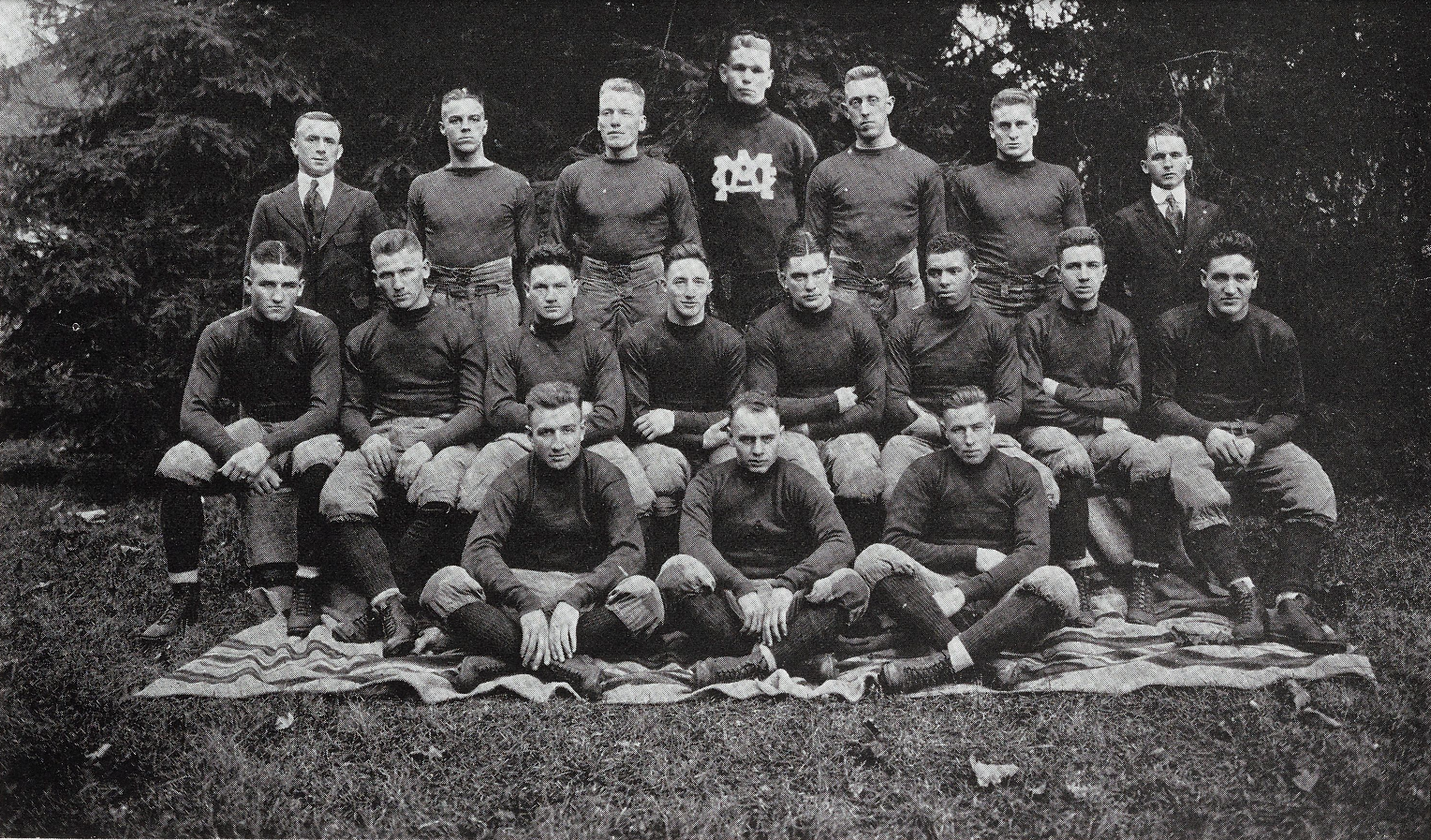
- Conference: Independent
- Record: 4–3
- Head coach: George Gauthier (1st season)
- Captain: Lawrence C. Archer
- Home stadium: College Field

1918 Midwestern college football independents records
	Conf.			Overall
Team	W	L	T	W		L		T
Detroit Junior College		–		4	–	0	–	0
Central Michigan		–		1	–	0	–	0
Marquette		–		2	–	0	–	1
Heidelberg		–		5	–	1	–	0
Lincoln (MO)		–		3	–	1	–	0
St. Xavier		–		4	–	1	–	1
Notre Dame		–		3	–	1	–	2
Butler		–		2	–	1	–	1
Western State Normal		–		3	–	2	–	0
Saint Louis		–		3	–	2	–	1
Michigan Agricultural		–		4	–	3	–	0
Akron		–		2	–	2	–	1
St. Mary's (OH)		–		1	–	1	–	0
Toledo		–		1	–	1	–	0
Nebraska		–		2	–	3	–	1
Michigan State Normal		–		1	–	2	–	0
Iowa State Teachers		–		1	–	3	–	0
Wabash		–		1	–	3	–	0
Fairmount		–		1	–	4	–	0
Haskell		–		1	–	4	–	0
Lake Forest		–		0	–	1	–	0
Detroit		–		0	–	2	–	0

The 1918 Michigan Agricultural Aggies football team represented Michigan Agricultural College (MAC) as an independent during the 1918 college football season. In their first year under head coach George Gauthier, the Aggies compiled a 4–3 record and outscored their opponents 133 to 69.

The game scheduled with Western Reserve, known today as Case Western Reserve, was cancelled due to the Ohio team having to go into quarantine due to the Spanish Influenza.

== Schedule ==
Date	Opponent	Site	Result	Attendance	Source
October 5	Albion	College Field; East Lansing, MI	W 21–6		
October 12	Hillsdale	College Field; East Lansing, MI	W 66–6		
November 2	Western Reserve	College Field; East Lansing, MI	Cancelled		
November 2	Western State Normal	College Field; East Lansing, MI	W 16–7		
November 9	Purdue	College Field; East Lansing, MI	L 6–14		
November 16	Notre Dame^{†}	College Field; East Lansing, MI (rivalry)	W 13–7		
November 23	at Michigan	Ferry Field; Ann Arbor, MI (rivalry	L 6–21	15,000	
November 28	at Wisconsin	Camp Randall Stadium; Madison, WI	L 6–7		
^{†}Homecoming

== Game summaries ==
=== Michigan ===
M.A.C. at Michigan

Team	1	2	3	4	Total
Aggies	0	0	0	6	6
• Wolverines	0	14	7	0	21

- Date: November 23
- Location: Ferry Field
  Ann Arbor, MI

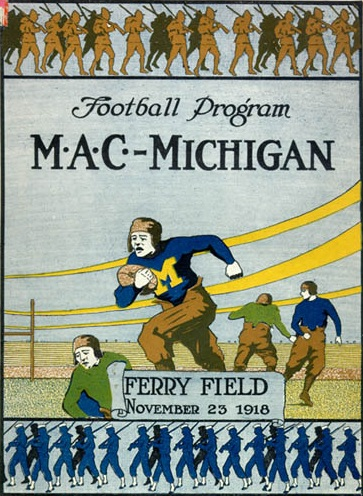
1918 M.A.C. program

On November 23, 1918, the Aggies played Michigan at Ferry Field in front of the largest crowd of the season estimated at between 10,000 and 20,000. Followers of both schools attended in large numbers, "the maize and blue of Michigan and the green and white of M.A.C. decorating the stands the length and breadth of them." The Aggies in 1918 had a new head coach, George Gauthier, and a highly touted African-American running back, Harry Graves. The Aggies had defeated Knute Rockne's Notre Dame the previous week in East Lansing.

After a scoreless first quarter, Michigan scored two touchdowns in the second quarter. Michigan's line was given credit for stopping the Aggies' running attack. The Detroit Free Press reported that M.A.C.'s "vaunted stars", including Harry Graves (described as "the colored boy of whom so much was expected"), were unable to assert themselves. "Superiority of the Michigan line was the rock upon which the Aggies split. M.A.C. showed a fast backfield that might have created endless trouble, but it got little support from the forwards, who were cracked open to let the Wolverines surge through and flatten the runner."

The start of the game was delayed by lengthy pre-game ceremonies featuring the French Blue Devils, performances by the U. of M. army and navy bands and the M.A.C. bands, parades by the Students' Army Training Corps and Naval Units, and a fly-over by former Michigan football captain Pat Smith in his aeroplane. Because of the delay, the game was concluded in darkness. The Aggies took advantage of the darkness late in the game by unleashing a passing attack. The Aggies scored late in the game, "as the darkness already had begun to enshroud the playing field," on a pass from Archer to Schwei. The Detroit Free Press reported: "But for the review of the service corps and the ceremonies attending there hardly would have been an Aggie score."

After the game, sports writer Harry Bullion wrote in the Detroit Free Press: "M.A.C.'s defeat is nothing for her to be ashamed of. It simply was a case of a better-conditioned and smarter eleven overpowering another that, though it lacked nothing in the way of fight that its enemy possessed, failed to cope with the superior knowledge of the game that was Michigan's by right of judgment and the attending conditions."
