= 1918 Notre Dame Fighting Irish football team =

American college football season

1918 Notre Dame Fighting Irish football
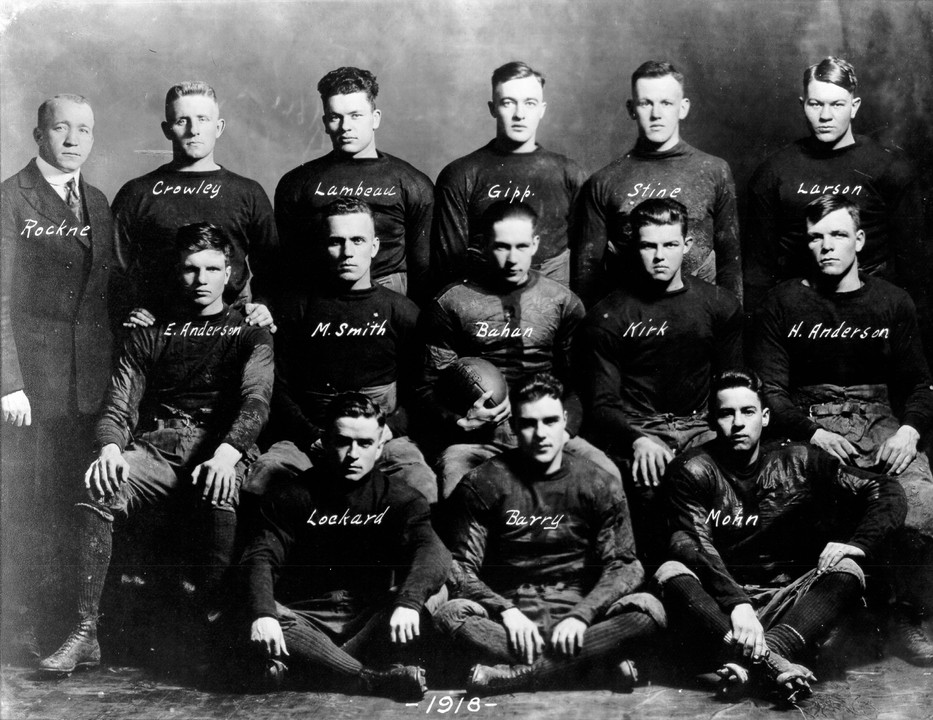
- Conference: Independent
- Record: 3–1–2
- Head coach: Knute Rockne (1st season)
- Offensive scheme: Single-wing
- Base defense: 7–2–2
- Captain: Leonard Bahan
- Home stadium: Cartier Field

1918 Midwestern college football independents records
	Conf.			Overall
Team	W	L	T	W		L		T
Detroit Junior College		–		4	–	0	–	0
Central Michigan		–		1	–	0	–	0
Marquette		–		2	–	0	–	1
Heidelberg		–		5	–	1	–	0
Lincoln (MO)		–		3	–	1	–	0
St. Xavier		–		4	–	1	–	1
Notre Dame		–		3	–	1	–	2
Butler		–		2	–	1	–	1
Western State Normal		–		3	–	2	–	0
Saint Louis		–		3	–	2	–	1
Michigan Agricultural		–		4	–	3	–	0
Akron		–		2	–	2	–	1
St. Mary's (OH)		–		1	–	1	–	0
Toledo		–		1	–	1	–	0
Nebraska		–		2	–	3	–	1
Michigan State Normal		–		1	–	2	–	0
Iowa State Teachers		–		1	–	3	–	0
Wabash		–		1	–	3	–	0
Fairmount		–		1	–	4	–	0
Haskell		–		1	–	4	–	0
Lake Forest		–		0	–	1	–	0
Detroit		–		0	–	2	–	0

The 1918 Notre Dame Fighting Irish football team was an American football team that represented the University of Notre Dame as an independent during the 1918 college football season. In their first year under head coach Knute Rockne, the Irish compiled a 3–1–2 record and outscored opponents by a total of 133 to 39. In games against major opponents, the team defeated Purdue, lost to Michigan State, and tied with Great Lakes Navy and Nebraska. The season was shortened from nine games to six due to the Spanish flu pandemic, with no games being played in October.

Key players on the 1918 team included acting captain and right halfback Leonard Bahan, left halfback George Gipp, left guard Hunk Anderson, left end Bernard Kirk, and fullback Curly Lambeau.

The team played its home games at Cartier Field in Notre Dame, Indiana.

== Schedule ==
Date	Opponent	Site	Result	Attendance	Source
September 28	at Case	Van Horn Field; Cleveland, OH	W 26–6		
November 2	at Wabash	Ingalls Field; Crawfordsville, IN	W 66–7		
November 9	Great Lakes Navy	Cartier Field; Notre Dame, IN	T 7–7		
November 16	at Michigan Agricultural	Old College Field; East Lansing, MI (rivalry)	L 7–13		
November 23	at Purdue	Stuart Field; West Lafayette, IN (rivalry)	W 26–6	7,000	
November 28	at Nebraska	Nebraska Field; Lincoln, NE (rivalry)	T 0–0		

== Personnel ==
=== Players ===
The following 14 players received monograms for their participation on the 1918 Notre Dame football team:

- Eddie Anderson, right end
- Hunk Anderson, left guard
- Leonard Bahan, acting captain and right halfback
- Norman Barry, halfback
- Crowley, right tackle
- George Gipp, left halfback
- Bernard Kirk, left end
- Curly Lambeau, fullback
- Ojay Larson, center
- Abie Lockard, quarterback
- Bill Mohn, quarterback
- Owens, right guard
- Clipper Smith, guard
- Rolly Stine, left tackle

=== Coaching staff ===
- Head coach - Knute Rockne
