= David L. Holmes (coach) =

American college sports coach and athletics administrator (1887–1960)

Biographical details
- Born: 1887; Carlton, Kansas, U.S.
- Died: June 19, 1960; Detroit, Michigan, U.S.

Coaching career (HC unless noted)

Football
- 1908–1911: Bethel (KY)
- 1912–1913: Oklahoma Tech
- 1918–1928: Detroit Junior/City College

Basketball
- 1908–1912: Bethel (KY)
- 1914–1917: Cass Technical HS (MI)
- 1917–1929: Detroit Junior/City College

Administrative career (AD unless noted)
- 1908–1912: Bethel (KY)
- 1912–1914: Oklahoma Tech
- 1914–1917: Cass Technical HS (MI)
- 1917–1958: Detroit Junior/City College / Wayne / Wayne State (MI)

Head coaching record
- Overall: 129–66 (college basketball); 50–47 (college outdoor track and field); 38–38 (college indoor track and field); 99–53 (college cross country)

David Lynn Holmes (1887 – June 19, 1960) was an American college sports coach and athletics administrator. Over a 41-year period, he coached football, basketball, track and field, and cross country at Wayne State University in Detroit.

Holmes was born in Carlton, Kansas. He attended school in Oklahoma, and graduated from Oklahoma Agricultural and Mechanical College—now known as Oklahoma State University—in 1908. He later earned a master's degree from Columbia University.

Holmes began his coaching career in 1908 at Bethel College in Russellville, Kentucky. There he served as physical director for four years, and coached football and basketball. He returned to his home state in 1912 when he was appointed head of the athletic department at the Oklahoma Institute of Technology—now known as Northern Oklahoma College—in Tonkawa. Two years later, he was hired as the physical director at Cass Technical High School in Detroit. Holmes married Hazel Jean Madden, on June 16, 1917.

Holmes died of a heart attack, on June 19, 1960, at Henry Ford Hospital in Detroit. He was inducted into the Michigan Sports Hall of Fame in 1975. Holmes' son, David L. Holmes (1932–2023), was a church historian and longtime professor at the College of William & Mary.

== Head coaching record ==
=== College football ===
Year	Team	Overall	Conference	Standing	Bowl/playoffs
Detroit Junior College / Detroit City College Tartars (Independent) (1918–1926)
1918	Detroit Junior College	4–0			
1919	Detroit Junior College	3–5			
1920	Detroit Junior College	5–1–1			
1921	Detroit Junior College	6–0–2			
1922	Detroit Junior College	2–3–2			
1923	Detroit City College	4–3–1			
1924	Detroit City College	2–5			
1925	Detroit City College	4–3–1			
1926	Detroit City College	2–4–1			
Detroit City College Tartars (Michigan Collegiate Conference) (1927–1928)
1927	Detroit City College	2–6	0–3	4th	
1928	Detroit City College	2–5–1	0–3	4th	
Detroit City College:		36–35–9	0–6		
Total:					
