= 1918 Miami Redskins football team =

American college football season

1918 Miami Redskins football
- Conference: Ohio Athletic Conference
- Record: 5–0–1 (4–0–1 OAC)
- Head coach: George Rider (2nd season)
- Home stadium: Miami Field

1918 Ohio Athletic Conference football standings
	Conf.					Overall
Team	W		L		T	W		L		T
Wittenberg $	3	–	0	–	0	4	–	0	–	0
Miami (OH)	4	–	0	–	1	5	–	0	–	1
Mount Union	5	–	1	–	0	6	–	1	–	0
Wooster	5	–	1	–	0	6	–	1	–	0
Western Reserve	5	–	1	–	0	5	–	2	–	0
Ohio	1	–	0	–	1	4	–	0	–	1
Cincinnati	0	–	0	–	2	3	–	0	–	2
Ohio Wesleyan	2	–	2	–	0	3	–	2	–	0
Case	2	–	3	–	2	3	–	5	–	2
Akron	1	–	2	–	1	2	–	2	–	1
Oberlin	1	–	4	–	0	1	–	4	–	0
Baldwin–Wallace	0	–	4	–	1	5	–	4	–	1
Kenyon	0	–	4	–	0	1	–	4	–	0
Ohio Northern	0	–	5	–	0	1	–	5	–	0
Denison	0	–	5	–	0	1	–	6	–	0
Ohio State *	3	–	0	–	0	3	–	3	–	0
$ – Conference champion; * – did not complete for championship

The 1918 Miami Redskins football team was an American football team that represented Miami University as a member of the Ohio Athletic Conference (OAC) during the 1918 college football season. In its second season under head coach George Rider, Miami compiled a 5–0–1 record (4–0–1 against conference opponents). Miami claims the 1918 conference championship. The team's games against Kentucky, Wooster, and Witteberg were cancelled due to the 1918 flu pandemic.

The season was part of a 27-game unbeaten streak that began in November 1915 and ended in October 1919.

== Schedule ==
Date	Opponent	Site	Result
September 28	Ohio Northern	Miami Field; Oxford, OH	W 47–0
November 2	Kenyon	Miami Field; Oxford, OH	W 62–0
November 9	at Ohio Wesleyan	Delaware, OH	W 14–7
November 16	Denison	Miami Field; Oxford, OH	W 20–6
November 23	Butler*	Miami Field; Oxford, OH	W 52–0
November 28	at Cincinnati	Cincinnati, OH (Victory Bell)	T 0–0
*Non-conference game
