= 1930 Central State Bearcats football team =

American college football season

1930 Central State Bearcats football
- Conference: Michigan Collegiate Conference
- Record: 6–2 (1–2 MCC)
- Head coach: Butch Nowack (2nd season)
- Home stadium: Alumni Field

1930 Michigan Collegiate Conference football standings
	Conf.					Overall
Team	W		L		T	W		L		T
Michigan State Normal $	3	–	0	–	0	6	–	1	–	0
Western State Teachers	2	–	1	–	0	5	–	1	–	1
Central State (MI)	1	–	2	–	0	6	–	2	–	0
Detroit City College	0	–	3	–	0	0	–	9	–	0
$ – Conference champion

The 1930 Central State Bearcats football team represented Central State Teachers College, later renamed Central Michigan University, in the Michigan Collegiate Conference (MCC) during the 1930 college football season. In their second and final season under head coach Butch Nowack, the Bearcats compiled a 6–2 record (1–2 against MCC opponents), shut out four of eight opponents, and outscored all opponents by a combined total of 108 to 81. The team lost to its in-state rivals Western State Teachers (0–54) and Michigan State Normal (0–13), but defeated Northern State Teachers (34–0) and Detroit City College (13–0). Coach Nowack left Central State in the spring of 1931 to accept a coaching position at Indiana.

== Schedule ==
Date	Opponent	Site	Result	Attendance	Source
September 27	Detroit "B"	Alumni Field; Mount Pleasant, MI	W 7–0		
October 4	Michigan "B"	Alumni Field; Mount Pleasant, MI	W 13–7	3,000	
October 11	at Western State Teachers	Western State Teachers College Field; Kalamazoo, MI (rivalry)	L 0–54		
October 18	at Ferris Institute	Big Rapids, MI	W 14–0		
October 25	Michigan State Normal^{†}	Alumni Field; Mount Pleasant, MI (rivalry)	L 0–13		
November 8	at Alma	Alma, MI	W 27–7		
November 15	Northern State Teachers (MI)	Mount Pleasant, MI	W 34–0		
November 27	at Detroit City College	Detroit, MI	W 13–0		
^{†}Homecoming
