= 1930 Western State Teachers Hilltoppers football team =

American college football season

1930 Western State Teachers Hilltoppers football
- Conference: Michigan Collegiate Conference
- Record: 5–1–1 (2–1 MCC)
- Head coach: Mike Gary (2nd season)
- Captain: Clarence Frendt

1930 Michigan Collegiate Conference football standings
	Conf.					Overall
Team	W		L		T	W		L		T
Michigan State Normal $	3	–	0	–	0	6	–	1	–	0
Western State Teachers	2	–	1	–	0	5	–	1	–	1
Central State (MI)	1	–	2	–	0	6	–	2	–	0
Detroit City College	0	–	3	–	0	0	–	9	–	0
$ – Conference champion

The 1930 Western State Teachers Hilltoppers football team represented Western State Teachers College (later renamed Western Michigan University) during the 1930 college football season. In their second season under head coach Mike Gary, the Hilltoppers compiled a 5–1–1 record and outscored their opponents, 192 to 25. Halfback Clarence Frendt was the team captain.

== Schedule ==
Date	Opponent	Site	Result	Source
October 4	Ferris Institute	Western State Teachers College Field; Kalamazoo, MI	W 46–0	
October 11	Central State (MI)	Western State Teachers College Field; Kalamazoo, MI (rivalry)	W 54–0	
October 18	at Michigan State Normal	Ypsilanti, MI	L 0–19	
October 25	at Detroit City College	Roosevelt Field; Detroit, MI	W 52–0	
	Michigan "B"	Western State Teachers College Field; Kalamazoo, MI	W 14–6	
November 8	at Iowa State Teachers	Cedar Falls, IA	W 26–0	
November 27	Western Kentucky State Teachers	Western State Teachers College Field; Kalamazoo, MI	T 0–0	
