= 1918 Iowa State Cyclones football team =

American college football season

1918 Iowa State Cyclones football
- Conference: Missouri Valley Conference
- Record: 0–3 (NA MVC)
- Head coach: Charles Mayser (4th season)
- Captain: V. A. "Chick" Heater
- Home stadium: State Field

1918 Missouri Valley Conference football standings
Drake	–	3	–	2	–	0
Iowa State	–	0	–	3	–	0
Kansas	–	2	–	2	–	0
Kansas State	–	4	–	1	–	0
Missouri	–	0	–	0	–	0
Nebraska	–	2	–	3	–	1
Washington University	–	6	–	0	–	0
Due to events related to World War I and the 1918 flu pandemic, the Missouri Valley Intercollegiate Athletic Association did not schedule any official conference games, recorded no standings, and awarded no title for 1918. Additionally, Missouri canceled their season.

The 1918 Iowa State Cyclones football team represented Iowa State College of Agricultural and Mechanic Arts (later renamed Iowa State University) in the Missouri Valley Conference during the 1918 college football season. In their fourth season under head coach Charles Mayser, the Cyclones compiled a 0–3 record and were outscored by opponents by a combined total of 38 to 0. Due to events related to World War I and the 1918 flu pandemic, the Missouri Valley Conference did not schedule any official conference games, recorded no standings, and awarded no title for 1918. The 1918 Iowa State team played their home games at State Field in Ames, Iowa. V.A. “Chick” Heater was the team captain.

== Schedule ==
Date	Opponent	Site	Result
November 9	Camp Dodge	State Field; Ames, IA	L 0–6
November 16	at Iowa	Iowa Field; Iowa City, IA (rivalry)	L 0–21
November 23	at Kansas State	Ahearn Field; Manhattan, KS (rivalry)	L 0–11
