= 1928 Central State Bearcats football team =

American college football season

1928 Central State Bearcats football
- Conference: Michigan Collegiate Conference
- Record: 6–3 (1–2 MCC)
- Head coach: Wallace Parker (6th season)
- Captain: Chet Stackhouse

1928 Michigan Collegiate Conference football standings
	Conf.					Overall
Team	W		L		T	W		L		T
Michigan State Normal $	3	–	0	–	0	7	–	1	–	0
Western State Teachers	2	–	1	–	0	5	–	2	–	0
Central State (MI)	1	–	2	–	0	6	–	3	–	0
Detroit City College	0	–	3	–	0	2	–	5	–	1
$ – Conference champion

The 1928 Central State Bearcats football team represented Central State Teachers College, later renamed Central Michigan University, in the Michigan Collegiate Conference (MCC) during the 1928 college football season. In their sixth and final season under head coach Wallace Parker, the Bearcats compiled a 6–3 record (1–2 against MCC opponents) and outscored their opponents by a combined total of 126 to 73. The team lost to its in-state rivals Michigan State Normal (0–36) and Western State Teachers (0–19).

Parker left the team after the 1928 season. In six years as head coach, he compiled a 32–10–6 record.

== Schedule ==
Date	Opponent	Site	Result	Source
September 29	Detroit Tech	Mount Pleasant, MI	W 18–0	
October 6	at Adrian	Adrian, MI	L 0–8	
October 13	at Toledo	Toledo, OH	W 13–0	
October 20	Northern State Teachers (MI)	Mount Pleasant, MI	W 26–0	
October 27	Michigan State Normal^{†}	Mount Pleasant, MI (rivalry)	L 0–36	
November 3	at Valparaiso	Valparaiso, IN	W 25–0	
November 10	at Ferris Institute	Big Rapids, MI	W 21–0	
November 24	at Western State Teachers	Kalamazoo, MI (rivalry)	L 0–19	
November 29	at Detroit City College	Roosevelt Field; Detroit, MI	W 23–0	
^{†}Homecoming
