= 1918 Washington University Pikers football team =

American college football season

1918 Washington University Pikers football

MVC S.A.T.C. champion
- Conference: Missouri Valley Conference
- Record: 6–0 (2–0 MVC)
- Head coach: Dick Rutherford (2nd season)
- Home stadium: Francis Field

1918 Missouri Valley Conference football standings
Drake	–	3	–	2	–	0
Iowa State	–	0	–	3	–	0
Kansas	–	2	–	2	–	0
Kansas State	–	4	–	1	–	0
Missouri	–	0	–	0	–	0
Nebraska	–	2	–	3	–	1
Washington University	–	6	–	0	–	0
Due to events related to World War I and the 1918 flu pandemic, the Missouri Valley Intercollegiate Athletic Association did not schedule any official conference games, recorded no standings, and awarded no title for 1918. Additionally, Missouri canceled their season.

The 1918 Washington University Pikers football team represented Washington University in St. Louis as a member of the Missouri Valley Conference during the 1918 college football season. In its second season under head coach Dick Rutherford, the team compiled a perfect 6–0 record and won the Missouri Valley Conference S.A.T.C. championship.

== Schedule ==
Date	Time	Opponent	Site	Result	Source
October 26		at Westminster (MO)*	Priest Field; Fulton, MO	W 29–6	
November 2		Missouri Mines*	Francis Field; St. Louis, MO	W 26–0	
November 9		Drake	Francis Field; St. Louis, MO	W 26–0	
November 23	2:15 p.m.	vs. Scott Field*	Francis Field; St. Louis, MO	W 21–8	
November 28		Saint Louis*	Francis Field; St. Louis, MO	W 19–0	
December 7		Nebraska	Francis Field; St. Louis, MO	W 20–7	
*Non-conference game; All times are in Central time
