= Bud Saunders =

American sports coach, athletics administrator (1884–1967)

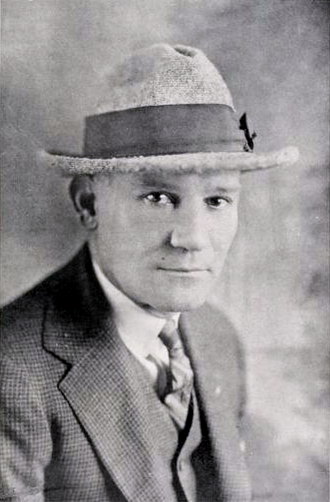
- Saunders at Clemson in 1923

Biographical details
- Born: May 1, 1884; St. Joseph, Missouri, U.S.
- Died: June 11, 1967 (aged 83); Galesburg, Illinois, U.S.

Playing career

Football
- 1909: Missouri

Baseball
- 1910–1911: Missouri
- Position: Quarterback (football)

Coaching career (HC unless noted)

Football
- 1911: William Jewell
- 1914: Missouri Mines (assistant)
- 1918–1919: Haskell
- 1920–1921: Grinnell
- 1922: Knox (IL) (assistant)
- 1923–1926: Clemson
- 1928–1931: Illinois College (backfield)
- 1933: Knox (IL) (assistant)
- 1935–?: Knox (IL) (freshmen)

Basketball
- 1920–1922: Grinnell
- 1922–1923: Knox (IL)
- 1923–1925: Clemson
- 1929–1932: Illinois College

Baseball
- 1930–1932: Illinois College

Track and field
- 1935–1948: Knox (IL)

Administrative career (AD unless noted)
- 1923–1926: Clemson

Head coaching record
- Overall: 26–34–8 (football); 45–93 (basketball)

William Howard "Bud" Saunders (May 1, 1884 – June 11, 1967) was an American football, basketball, baseball, and track and field coach and college athletics administrator. He served as the head football coach at William Jewell College in 1911, at Haskell Institute—now Haskell Indian Nations University—from 1918 to 1919, at Grinnell College from 1920 to 1921, and at Clemson University from 1923 to 1926. Saunders was the head basketball coach at Knox College in Galesburg, Illinois during the 1922–23 season and at Clemson from 1923 to 1925, compiling a career college basketball coaching record of 20–40. He also served as the athletic director at Clemson from 1923 to 1926.

== Early life and college career ==
Saunders pictured as a senior in Savitar 1911, Missouri yearbook

Saunders was born on May 1, 1884, St. Joseph, Missouri. He graduated from the University of Missouri in 1911, in the field of law. He played football there as a quarterback on William Roper's 1909 team. He was also a member of Phi Delta Theta during his time at Missouri.

== Coaching career ==
Saunders began his coaching career in William Jewell College in Liberty, Missouri when he took charge of the football team in October 1911. He had been slated to coach football at Missouri Valley College that year, but the school disbanded their football team. Saunders served briefly as a football coach at Knox College in Galesburg, Illinois previous to his stint at Clemson.

In 1928, Saunders assisted William T. Harmon in coaching the football team at Illinois College in Jacksonville, Illinois. The following year, he was appointed the school's head basketball coach. Saunders remained coach in basketball and baseball and assistant coach in football at Illinois College until 1932. He led his basketball teams at Illinois to a record of 14–27 in three seasons, from 1929 to 1932. Saunders returned to Knox College in 1933 as backfield coach for the football team. When Pete Reynolds was hired as Knox's head football coach in 1935, Saunders was appointed freshman football coach under Reynolds. Saunders also served as head track coach at Knox until his resignation in 1948.

== Death and family ==
Saunders died on June 11, 1967, at St. Mary's Hospital in Galesburg. He married Beatrice Carney on December 14, 1923. She died on April 20, 1967.

== Head coaching record ==
=== Football ===
Year	Team	Overall	Conference	Standing
William Jewell Baptists (Independent) (1911)
1911	William Jewell	2–3–5		
William Jewell:		2–3–5		
Haskell Indians (Independent) (1918–1919)
1918	Haskell	1–4		
1919	Haskell	8–2–1		
Haskell:		9–6–1		
Grinnell Pioneers (Missouri Valley Intercollegiate Athletic Association) (1920–1921)
1920	Grinnell	3–3–1	0–2–1	7th
1921	Grinnell	2–5	0–4	9th
Grinnell:		5–8–1	0–6–1	
Clemson Tigers (Southern Conference) (1923–1926)
1923	Clemson	5–2–1	1–1–1	T–11th
1924	Clemson	2–6	0–3	T–19th
1925	Clemson	1–7	0–4	T–20th
1926	Clemson	2–2 (Note: Saunders resigned after the first four games of the 1926 season. Bob Williams, who had previously served as Clemson's head coach in 1906, 1909, and from 1913 to 1915, led the team for the final five games of the season. Clemson finished with an overall record of 2–7 and a conference mark of 1–3, placing 18th in the Southern Conference.)	1–1	
Clemson:		10–17–1	2–9–1	
Total:		26–34–8		
