= 1928 Michigan State Normal Normalites football team =

American college football season

1928 Michigan State Normal Normalites football

MCC champion
- Conference: Michigan Collegiate Conference
- Record: 7–1 (3–0 MCC)
- Head coach: Elton Rynearson (7th season)
- Captain: Raymond L. Stites
- Home stadium: Normal Field

1928 Michigan Collegiate Conference football standings
	Conf.					Overall
Team	W		L		T	W		L		T
Michigan State Normal $	3	–	0	–	0	7	–	1	–	0
Western State Teachers	2	–	1	–	0	5	–	2	–	0
Central State (MI)	1	–	2	–	0	6	–	3	–	0
Detroit City College	0	–	3	–	0	2	–	5	–	1
$ – Conference champion

The 1928 Michigan State Normal Normalites football team represented Michigan State Normal College (later renamed Eastern Michigan University) during the 1928 college football season. In their seventh season under head coach Elton Rynearson, the Normalites compiled a record of 7–1 (3–0 against conference opponents), won the Michigan Collegiate Conference championship, and outscored their opponents by a combined total of 233 to 43. Raymond L. Stites was the team captain. The team played its home games at Normal Field on the school's campus in Ypsilanti, Michigan.

== Schedule ==
Date	Opponent	Site	Result	Source
September 29	at John Carroll*	University Heights, OH	L 9–31	
October 6	Olivet*	Ypsilanti, MI	W 33–0	
October 13	Michigan "B"*	Ypsilanti, MI	W 25–3	
October 19	Adrian*	Ypsilanti, MI	W 38–0	
October 27	at Central State (MI)	Mount Pleasant, MI (rivalry)	W 36–0	
November 3	at Northern Illinois*	Glidden Field; DeKalb, IL	W 43–0	
November 10	Western State Teachers (MI)^{†}	Ypsilanti, MI	W 18–9	
November 17	at Detroit City College	Roosevelt Field; Detroit, MI	W 55–0	
*Non-conference game; ^{†}Homecoming
