= 1918 Kansas Jayhawks football team =

American college football season

1918 Kansas Jayhawks football
- Conference: Missouri Valley Conference
- Record: 2–2 (0–0 MVC)
- Head coach: Jay Bond (1st season)
- Captain: Lewis Foster
- Home stadium: McCook Field

1918 Missouri Valley Conference football standings
Drake	–	3	–	2	–	0
Iowa State	–	0	–	3	–	0
Kansas	–	2	–	2	–	0
Kansas State	–	4	–	1	–	0
Missouri	–	0	–	0	–	0
Nebraska	–	2	–	3	–	1
Washington University	–	6	–	0	–	0
Due to events related to World War I and the 1918 flu pandemic, the Missouri Valley Intercollegiate Athletic Association did not schedule any official conference games, recorded no standings, and awarded no title for 1918. Additionally, Missouri canceled their season.

The 1918 Kansas Jayhawks football team represented the University of Kansas as a member of the Missouri Valley Conference (MVC) during the 1918 college football season. In their first and only season under head coach Jay Bond, the Jayhawks compiled a record of 2–2 record and were outscored by opponents by a combined total of 66 to 33. Due to events related to World War I and the 1918 flu pandemic, the Missouri Valley Conference did not schedule any official conference games, recorded no standings, and awarded no title for 1918. The 1918 Kansas team played its home games at McCook Field in Lawrence, Kansas. Lewis Foster was the team captain.

== Schedule ==
Season was shortened due to the Spanish flu pandemic.

Date	Opponent	Site	Result	Source
November 9	Oklahoma	McCook Field; Lawrence, KS	L 0–33	
November 16	at Nebraska	Nebraska Field; Lincoln, NE (rivalry)	L 0–20	
November 23	Baker	McCook Field; Lawrence, KS	W 20–6	
November 28	Kansas State	McCook Field; Lawrence, KS (rivalry)	W 13–7	
