= 1928 Western State Teachers Hilltoppers football team =

American college football season

1928 Western State Teachers Hilltoppers football
- Conference: Michigan Collegiate Conference
- Record: 5–2 (2–1 MCC)
- Head coach: Earl Martineau (5th season)
- Captain: Dick Frankowski

1928 Michigan Collegiate Conference football standings
| | Conf. | | | | | Overall |
| Team | W | | L | | T | W | | L | | T |
|---|---|---|---|---|---|---|---|---|---|---|
| Michigan State Normal $ | 3 | – | 0 | – | 0 | 7 | – | 1 | – | 0 |
| Western State Teachers | 2 | – | 1 | – | 0 | 5 | – | 2 | – | 0 |
| Central State (MI) | 1 | – | 2 | – | 0 | 6 | – | 3 | – | 0 |
| Detroit City College | 0 | – | 3 | – | 0 | 2 | – | 5 | – | 1 |
$ – Conference champion

The 1928 Western State Teachers Hilltoppers football team represented Western State Teachers College (later renamed Western Michigan University) as an independent during the 1928 college football season. In their fifth and final season under head coach Earl Martineau, the Hilltoppers compiled a 5–2 record and outscored their opponents, 119 to 32. Center Dick Frankowski was the team captain.

Coach Martineau left Western State after the 1928 season to accept an assistant coaching position at Purdue. In five years at Western State, Martineau compile a 26–10–2 record.

== Schedule ==
| Date | Opponent | Site | Result | Source |
|---|---|---|---|---|
| September 29 | Chicago YMCA College | Western State Teachers College Field; Kalamazoo, MI | W 26–0 | |
| October 6 | Ferris Institute | Western State Teachers College Field; Kalamazoo, MI | W 14–0 | |
| October 13 | Lombard | Western State Teachers College Field; Kalamazoo, MI | L 0–14 | |
| October 27 | at Detroit City College | Roosevelt Field; Detroit, MI | W 45–0 | |
| November 3 | Michigan "B"^{†} | Western State Teachers College Field; Kalamazoo, MI | W 6–0 | |
| November 10 | at Michigan State Normal | Ypsilanti, MI | L 9–18 | |
| November 24 | Central State (MI) | Western State Teachers College Field; Kalamazoo, MI (rivalry) | W 19–0 | |
^{†}Homecoming
