= J. Russell Townsend =

American football and basketball coach (1884–1969)

Biographical details
- Born: October 1884; Tama County, Iowa, U.S.
- Died: December 8, 1969 (aged 85); Indianapolis, Indiana, U.S.

Playing career

Football
- 1905–1906: Coe
- Positions: End, halfback

Coaching career (HC unless noted)

Football
- 1917–1918: Wabash

Basketball
- 1917–1919: Wabash

Baseball
- 1918: Wabash

Head coaching record
- Overall: 2–9–1 (football); 16–14 (basketball); 5–5 (baseball)

J. Russell Townsend (October 1884 – December 8, 1969) was an American football and basketball coach. He was the 21st head football coach at Wabash College in Crawfordsville, Indiana, serving for two seasons, from 1917 to 1918, and compiling a record of 2–9–1. He was also the head basketball coach at Wabash from 1917 to 1919, tallying a mark of 16–14.

Townsend was a graduate of Coe College, where he played college football. He died on December 8, 1969, at Winona Memorial Hospital in Indianapolis, Indiana.

== Head coaching record ==
=== College football ===
Year	Team	Overall	Conference	Standing	Bowl/playoffs
Wabash Little Giants (Independent) (1917–1918)
1917	Wabash	1–6–1			
1918	Wabash	1–3			
Wabash:		2–9–1			
Total:		2–9–1			
