= Frank A. Yocum =

American football player and coach (1892–1970)

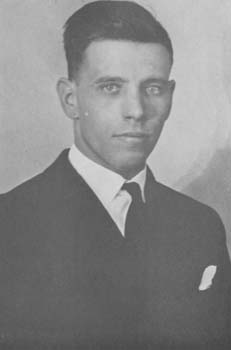

Biographical details
- Born: December 11, 1892; LaGrange, Ohio, U.S.
- Died: June 29, 1970 (aged 77); Shaker Heights, Ohio, U.S.
- Education: Oberlin (1915); Western Reserve Dental School (1919)

Playing career

Football
- 1912–1914: Oberlin
- 1916: Cleveland Indians

Track
- 1913–1915: Oberlin

Coaching career (HC unless noted)

Football
- 1915: East HS (OH) (assistant)
- 1916: Western Reserve (freshmen)
- 1917–1918: Western Reserve

Cross Country
- 1923: Western Reserve

Track
- 1924: Western Reserve

Baseball
- 1924–1928: Western Reserve

Head coaching record
- Overall: 8–7–1 (football); 26–19–0 (baseball); 3–0–0 (cross country)

Frank Alvin Yocum (December 11, 1892 – June 29, 1970) was an American football player and coach. Yocum attended Oberlin High School graduating in 1910 and Oberlin College graduation 1915. He played professional football as a halfback for the 1916 Cleveland Indians.

Yocum coached the Western Reserve football team for two seasons, from 1917 to 1918, while attending the Western Reserve Dental School.

In 1990, 20 years after his death, Yocum was inducted into the Case Western Reserve Spartans sports Hall of Fame.

== Head coaching record ==
Year	Team	Overall	Conference	Standing	Bowl/playoffs
Western Reserve (Ohio Athletic Conference) (1917–1918)
1917	Western Reserve	3–5–1	3–4–1		
1918	Western Reserve	5–2	5–1		
Western Reserve:		8–7–1	8–5–1		
Total:		8–7–1			
