= 1918 Western Reserve football team =

American college football season

1918 Western Reserve football
- Conference: Ohio Athletic Conference
- Record: 5–2 (5–1 OAC)
- Head coach: Frank A. Yocum (2nd season)

1918 Ohio Athletic Conference football standings
	Conf.					Overall
Team	W		L		T	W		L		T
Wittenberg $	3	–	0	–	0	4	–	0	–	0
Miami (OH)	4	–	0	–	1	5	–	0	–	1
Mount Union	5	–	1	–	0	6	–	1	–	0
Wooster	5	–	1	–	0	6	–	1	–	0
Western Reserve	5	–	1	–	0	5	–	2	–	0
Ohio	1	–	0	–	1	4	–	0	–	1
Cincinnati	0	–	0	–	2	3	–	0	–	2
Ohio Wesleyan	2	–	2	–	0	3	–	2	–	0
Case	2	–	3	–	2	3	–	5	–	2
Akron	1	–	2	–	1	2	–	2	–	1
Oberlin	1	–	4	–	0	1	–	4	–	0
Baldwin–Wallace	0	–	4	–	1	5	–	4	–	1
Kenyon	0	–	4	–	0	1	–	4	–	0
Ohio Northern	0	–	5	–	0	1	–	5	–	0
Denison	0	–	5	–	0	1	–	6	–	0
Ohio State *	3	–	0	–	0	3	–	3	–	0
$ – Conference champion; * – did not complete for championship

The 1918 Western Reserve football team represented Western Reserve University—now known as Case Western Reserve University, during the 1918 college football season. The team's coach was Frank A. Yocum. Originally Wooster was on the schedule, but due to the Spanish flu, Oberlin College was played a second time to fill the cancellation. The Michigan Agricultural game was cancelled due to the team having to go into quarantine.

== Schedule ==
Date	Opponent	Site	Result
October 9	at Baldwin–Wallace	Berea, OH	W 20–0
October 12	Akron		Cancelled
October 19	Cleveland Naval Reserves*	League Park; Cleveland, OH	L 6–20
October 26	at Oberlin	Oberlin, OH	W 6–3
November 2	Michigan Agricultural		Cancelled
November 9	Ohio Northern	Cleveland, OH	W 14–6
November 16	Mount Union	Cleveland, OH	L forfeit
November 23	Oberlin	Cleveland, OH	W 13–7
November 28	at Case	Van Horn Field; Cleveland, OH	W 14–7
*Non-conference game
