= 1918 Kansas State Farmers football team =

American college football season

1918 Kansas State Farmers football
- Conference: Missouri Valley Conference
- Record: 4–1 (1–1 MVC)
- Head coach: Zora Clevenger (3rd season)
- Home stadium: Ahearn Field

1918 Missouri Valley Conference football standings
| Drake | – | 3 | – | 2 | – | 0 |
| Iowa State | – | 0 | – | 3 | – | 0 |
| Kansas | – | 2 | – | 2 | – | 0 |
| Kansas State | – | 4 | – | 1 | – | 0 |
| Missouri | – | 0 | – | 0 | – | 0 |
| Nebraska | – | 2 | – | 3 | – | 1 |
| Washington University | – | 6 | – | 0 | – | 0 |
Due to events related to World War I and the 1918 flu pandemic, the Missouri Valley Intercollegiate Athletic Association did not schedule any official conference games, recorded no standings, and awarded no title for 1918. Additionally, Missouri canceled their season.

The 1918 Kansas State Farmers football team represented Kansas State Agricultural College in the 1918 college football season.

== Schedule ==
| Date | Opponent | Site | Result | Source |
|---|---|---|---|---|
| September 28 | Baker* | Ahearn Field; Manhattan, KS | W 22–0 | |
| October 5 | Fort Riley* | Ahearn Field; Manhattan, KS | W 27–7 | |
| November 9 | Washburn* | Ahearn Field; Manhattan, KS | W 28–9 | |
| November 23 | Iowa State | Ahearn Field; Manhattan, KS | W 11–0 | |
| November 28 | at Kansas | McCook Field; Lawrence, KS (rivalry) | L 7–13 | |
*Non-conference game
