= 1918 Case Scientists football team =

American college football season

1918 Case Scientists football
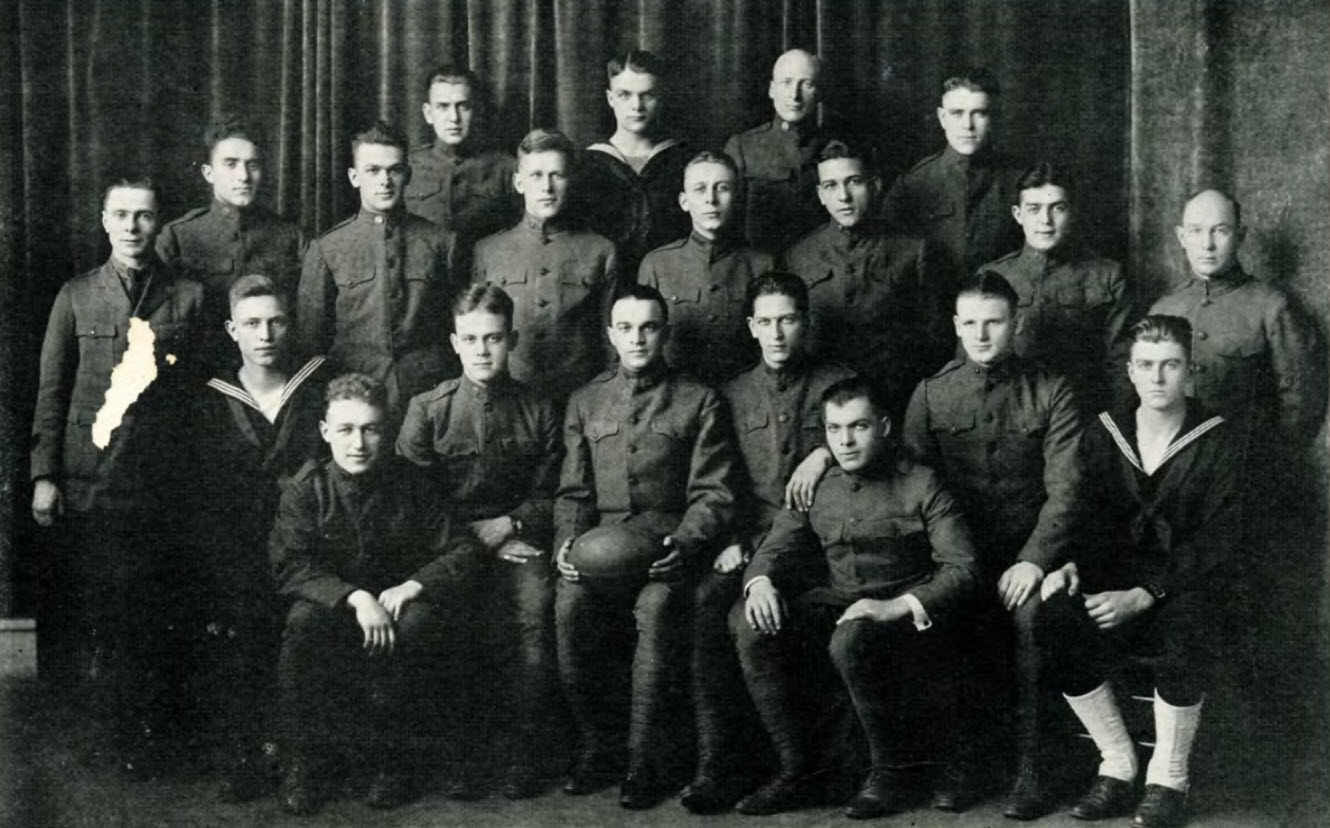
- Conference: Ohio Athletic Conference
- Record: 3–5–2 (2–3–2 OAC)
- Head coach: Pat Pasini (3rd season)
- Home stadium: Van Horn Field

1918 Ohio Athletic Conference football standings
	Conf.					Overall
Team	W		L		T	W		L		T
Wittenberg $	3	–	0	–	0	4	–	0	–	0
Miami (OH)	4	–	0	–	1	5	–	0	–	1
Mount Union	5	–	1	–	0	6	–	1	–	0
Wooster	5	–	1	–	0	6	–	1	–	0
Western Reserve	5	–	1	–	0	5	–	2	–	0
Ohio	1	–	0	–	1	4	–	0	–	1
Cincinnati	0	–	0	–	2	3	–	0	–	2
Ohio Wesleyan	2	–	2	–	0	3	–	2	–	0
Case	2	–	3	–	2	3	–	5	–	2
Akron	1	–	2	–	1	2	–	2	–	1
Oberlin	1	–	4	–	0	1	–	4	–	0
Baldwin–Wallace	0	–	4	–	1	5	–	4	–	1
Kenyon	0	–	4	–	0	1	–	4	–	0
Ohio Northern	0	–	5	–	0	1	–	5	–	0
Denison	0	–	5	–	0	1	–	6	–	0
Ohio State *	3	–	0	–	0	3	–	3	–	0
$ – Conference champion; * – did not complete for championship

The 1918 Case Scientists football team represented the Case School of Applied Science, now a part of Case Western Reserve University, during the 1918 college football season. The team's head coach was Pat Pasini.

Due to the Spanish flu pandemic, Case played the Wooster and Hiram games behind locked gates with no fans and cancelled their games with Ohio Wesleyan and Kenyon. The game against Baldwin–Wallace was rescheduled from September 21 to midweek contest on November 6 and Hiram was added late in the year.

== Schedule ==
Date	Opponent	Site	Result	Source
September 28	Notre Dame*	Van Horn Field; Cleveland, OH	L 6–26	
October 5	at Michigan*	Ferry Field; Ann Arbor, MI	L 0–33	
October 12	at Ohio Wesleyan		canceled	
October 19	Kenyon		canceled	
October 26	at Mount Union	Mount Union Stadium; Alliance, OH	L 0–19	
October 30	Hiram*	Van Horn Field; Cleveland, OH	W 41–2	
November 2	Wooster	Van Horn Field; Cleveland, OH	W 7–6	
November 6	Baldwin–Wallace	Van Horn Field; Cleveland, OH	T 0–0	
November 9	at Ohio State*	Ohio Field; Columbus, OH	L 0–56	
November 16	at Oberlin	Dill Field; Oberlin, OH	W 17–0	
November 23	at Akron	Buchtel Field; Akron, OH	T 0–0	
November 28	Western Reserve	Van Horn Field; Cleveland, OH	L 7–14	
*Non-conference game
