= 1918 Ohio Green and White football team =

American college football season

1918 Ohio Green and White football
- Conference: Ohio Athletic Conference
- Record: 4–0–1 (1–0–1 OAC)
- Head coach: Frank Gullum (1st season)

1918 Ohio Athletic Conference football standings
	Conf.					Overall
Team	W		L		T	W		L		T
Wittenberg $	3	–	0	–	0	4	–	0	–	0
Miami (OH)	4	–	0	–	1	5	–	0	–	1
Mount Union	5	–	1	–	0	6	–	1	–	0
Wooster	5	–	1	–	0	6	–	1	–	0
Western Reserve	5	–	1	–	0	5	–	2	–	0
Ohio	1	–	0	–	1	4	–	0	–	1
Cincinnati	0	–	0	–	2	3	–	0	–	2
Ohio Wesleyan	2	–	2	–	0	3	–	2	–	0
Case	2	–	3	–	2	3	–	5	–	2
Akron	1	–	2	–	1	2	–	2	–	1
Oberlin	1	–	4	–	0	1	–	4	–	0
Baldwin–Wallace	0	–	4	–	1	5	–	4	–	1
Kenyon	0	–	4	–	0	1	–	4	–	0
Ohio Northern	0	–	5	–	0	1	–	5	–	0
Denison	0	–	5	–	0	1	–	6	–	0
Ohio State *	3	–	0	–	0	3	–	3	–	0
$ – Conference champion; * – did not complete for championship

The 1918 Ohio Green and White football team represented Ohio University as a member of the Ohio Athletic Conference (OAC) during the 1918 college football season. Led by first-year head coach Frank Gullum, the Green and White compiled an overall record of 4–0–1 with a mark of 1–0–1 in conference play, placing sixth in the OAC.

== Schedule ==
Date	Opponent	Site	Result	Source
October 5	Ohio State freshman*	Athens, OH	W 13–6	
October 18	Camp Sherman*		W 62–0	
October 26	Marietta*	Athens, OH	W 52–7	
November 9	Cincinnati	Athens, OH	T 6–6	
November 23	at Denison	Granville, OH	W 7–0	
*Non-conference game
