= Jay Bond =

American football and baseball coach

Biographical details
- Born: April 11, 1885; McLouth, Kansas, U.S.
- Died: May 15, 1954 (aged 69); McLouth, Kansas, U.S.

Coaching career (HC unless noted)

Football
- 1918: Kansas

Baseball
- 1918–1919: Kansas

Head coaching record
- Overall: 2–2 (football); 5–9 (baseball)

James Edward "Jay" Bond (April 11, 1885 – May 15, 1954) was an American football and baseball coach. He was the 16th head football coach at the University of Kansas, serving the 1918 season, which was shortened due to an outbreak of influenza on campus. Bond's 1918 Kansas Jayhawks football team compiled a record of 2–2. Bond was also the head baseball coach at Kansas from 1918 to 1919, tallying a mark of 5–9.

== Head coaching record ==
=== Football ===
Year	Team	Overall	Conference	Standing	Bowl/playoffs
Kansas Jayhawks (Missouri Valley Intercollegiate Athletic Association) (1918)
1918	Kansas	2–2	NA	NA	
Kansas:		2–2			
Total:		2–2			
