= 1930 Michigan State Normal Hurons football team =

American college football season

1930 Michigan State Normal Hurons football

MCC champion
- Conference: Michigan Collegiate Conference
- Record: 6–1 (3–0 MCC)
- Head coach: Elton Rynearson (9th season)
- Captain: Paul D. Shoemaker
- Home stadium: Normal Field

1930 Michigan Collegiate Conference football standings
	Conf.					Overall
Team	W		L		T	W		L		T
Michigan State Normal $	3	–	0	–	0	6	–	1	–	0
Western State Teachers	2	–	1	–	0	5	–	1	–	1
Central State (MI)	1	–	2	–	0	6	–	2	–	0
Detroit City College	0	–	3	–	0	0	–	9	–	0
$ – Conference champion

The 1930 Michigan State Normal Hurons football team represented Michigan State Normal College (later renamed Eastern Michigan University) during the 1930 college football season. In their ninth season under head coach Elton Rynearson, the Hurons compiled a record of 6–1 and outscored their opponents by a combined total of 145 to 14. Paul D. Shoemaker was the team captain. The team played its home games at Normal Field on the school's campus in Ypsilanti, Michigan.

The Hurons lost their opening game, 7-0, to Michigan, a team that finished the season with an undefeated record and as champion of the Big Ten Conference. According to a United Press account of the game, the Hurons "outplayed the Wolves in two quarters, held them even in another, and broke just long enough in the third period to allow Michigan to flash through two forward passes and a lateral pass for a touchdown."

After losing to Michigan, the Hurons won their remaining six games, including five consecutive shutouts to end the season.

== Schedule ==
Date	Opponent	Site	Result	Attendance
September 27	at Michigan*	Michigan Stadium; Ann Arbor, MI	L 0–7	12,760
October 11	Detroit City College	Ypsilanti, MI	W 33–7	
October 18	Western State Teachers (MI)^{†}	Ypsilanti, MI	W 19–0	
October 25	at Central State (MI)	Mount Pleasant, MI (rivalry)	W 13–0	
November 1	Georgetown (KY)*	Ypsilanti, MI	W 45–0	
November 8	Notre Dame "B"*	Ypsilanti, MI	W 16–0	
November 15	at Iowa State Teachers*	Cedar Falls, IA	W 19–0	
*Non-conference game; ^{†}Homecoming
