= 1918 Cincinnati Bearcats football team =

American college football season

1918 Cincinnati Bearcats football
- Conference: Ohio Athletic Conference
- Record: 3–0–2 (0–0–2 OAC)
- Head coach: Boyd Chambers (1st season)
- Captain: Charles Shyrock
- Home stadium: Carson Field

1918 Ohio Athletic Conference football standings
	Conf.					Overall
Team	W		L		T	W		L		T
Wittenberg $	3	–	0	–	0	4	–	0	–	0
Miami (OH)	4	–	0	–	1	5	–	0	–	1
Mount Union	5	–	1	–	0	6	–	1	–	0
Wooster	5	–	1	–	0	6	–	1	–	0
Western Reserve	5	–	1	–	0	5	–	2	–	0
Ohio	1	–	0	–	1	4	–	0	–	1
Cincinnati	0	–	0	–	2	3	–	0	–	2
Ohio Wesleyan	2	–	2	–	0	3	–	2	–	0
Case	2	–	3	–	2	3	–	5	–	2
Akron	1	–	2	–	1	2	–	2	–	1
Oberlin	1	–	4	–	0	1	–	4	–	0
Baldwin–Wallace	0	–	4	–	1	5	–	4	–	1
Kenyon	0	–	4	–	0	1	–	4	–	0
Ohio Northern	0	–	5	–	0	1	–	5	–	0
Denison	0	–	5	–	0	1	–	6	–	0
Ohio State *	3	–	0	–	0	3	–	3	–	0
$ – Conference champion; * – did not complete for championship

The 1918 Cincinnati Bearcats football team was an American football team that represented the University of Cincinnati as a member of the Ohio Athletic Conference during the 1918 college football season. In their first season under head coach Boyd Chambers, the Bearcats compiled a 3–0–2 record (0–0–2 against conference opponents). Charles Shyrock was the team captain. The team played its home games at Carson Field in Cincinnati.

== Schedule ==
Date	Opponent	Site	Result
November 2	Fort Thomas, (KY)*	Carson Field; Cincinnati, OH	W 6–0
November 9	at Ohio	Athens, OH	T 6–6
November 23	Georgetown (KY)*	Carson Field; Cincinnati, OH	W 21–7
November 28	Miami (OH)	Carson Field; Cincinnati, OH (Victory Bell)	T 0–0
December 7	St. Xavier*	Carson Field; Cincinnati, OH (rivalry)	W 12–0
*Non-conference game
