= 1929 Western State Teachers Hilltoppers football team =

American college football season

1929 Western State Teachers Hilltoppers football

MCC co-champion
- Conference: Michigan Collegiate Conference
- Record: 5–2–1 (2–0–1 MCC)
- Head coach: Mike Gary (1st season)
- Captain: Herman Seborg
- Home stadium: Western State Teachers College Field

1929 Michigan Collegiate Conference football standings
| | Conf. | | | | | Overall |
| Team | W | | L | | T | W | | L | | T |
|---|---|---|---|---|---|---|---|---|---|---|
| Michigan State Normal + | 2 | – | 0 | – | 1 | 5 | – | 1 | – | 2 |
| Western State Teachers + | 2 | – | 0 | – | 1 | 5 | – | 2 | – | 1 |
| Detroit City College | 1 | – | 2 | – | 0 | 2 | – | 7 | – | 0 |
| Central State (MI) | 0 | – | 3 | – | 0 | 2 | – | 3 | – | 2 |
+ – Conference co-champions

The 1929 Western State Teachers Hilltoppers football team represented Western State Teachers College (later renamed Western Michigan University) during the 1929 college football season. In their first season under head coach Mike Gary, the Hilltoppers compiled a 5–2–1 record and outscored their opponents, 161 to 44. Halfback Herman Seborg was the team captain. They played their home games at Western State Teachers College Field.

== Schedule ==
| Date | Opponent | Site | Result | Source |
|---|---|---|---|---|
| September 28 | Ferris Institute | Western State Teachers College Field; Kalamazoo, MI | W 41–0 | |
| October 5 | Illinois "B" | Western State Teachers College Field; Kalamazoo, MI | W 20–0 | |
| October 12 | Notre Dame "B" | Western State Teachers College Field; Kalamazoo, MI | L 7–13 | |
| October 19 | at Lombard | Galesburg, IL | W 14–6 | |
| October 26 | Detroit City College | Western State Teachers College Field; Kalamazoo, MI | W 40–0 | |
| November 2 | Michigan State Normal | Western State Teachers College Field; Kalamazoo, MI | T 7–7 | |
| November 9 | at Central State (MI) | Mount Pleasant, MI (rivalry) | W 25–6 | |
| November 16 | at Michigan "B" | Ann Arbor, MI | L 7–12 | |
