= 1929 Michigan State Normal Hurons football team =

American college football season

1929 Michigan State Normal Hurons football

MCC co-champion
- Conference: Michigan Collegiate Conference
- Record: 5–1–2 (2–0–1 MCC)
- Head coach: Elton Rynearson (8th season)
- Captain: Wilbur L. Gunnerson
- Home stadium: Normal Field

1929 Michigan Collegiate Conference football standings
| | Conf. | | | | | Overall |
| Team | W | | L | | T | W | | L | | T |
|---|---|---|---|---|---|---|---|---|---|---|
| Michigan State Normal + | 2 | – | 0 | – | 1 | 5 | – | 1 | – | 2 |
| Western State Teachers + | 2 | – | 0 | – | 1 | 5 | – | 2 | – | 1 |
| Detroit City College | 1 | – | 2 | – | 0 | 2 | – | 7 | – | 0 |
| Central State (MI) | 0 | – | 3 | – | 0 | 2 | – | 3 | – | 2 |
+ – Conference co-champions

The 1929 Michigan State Normal Hurons football team represented Michigan State Normal College (later renamed Eastern Michigan University) during the 1929 college football season. In their eighth season under head coach Elton Rynearson, the Hurons compiled a record of 5–1–2 (2–0–1 against conference opponents), won the Michigan Collegiate Conference championship, and outscored their opponents by a combined total of 156 to 45. Wilbur L. Gunnerson was the team captain. The team played its home games at Normal Field on the school's campus in Ypsilanti, Michigan.

== Schedule ==
| Date | Opponent | Site | Result | Source |
|---|---|---|---|---|
| October 5 | Bowling Green* | Ypsilanti, MI | W 34–7 | |
| October 12 | vs. DePaul* | Soldier Field; Chicago, IL | W 27–0 | |
| October 19 | Notre Dame "B"* | Ypsilanti, MI | W 13–7 | |
| October 26 | Central State (MI)^{†} | Normal Field; Ypsilanti, MI (rivalry) | W 24–0 | |
| November 2 | at Western State Teachers (MI) | Western State Teachers College Field; Kalamazoo, MI | T 7–7 | |
| November 9 | Michigan "B"* | Ypsilanti, MI | L 14–18 | |
| November 16 | John Carroll* | Ypsilanti, MI | T 6–6 | |
| November 23 | at Detroit City College | Detroit, MI | W 31–0 | |
*Non-conference game; ^{†}Homecoming
