= 1929 Central State Bearcats football team =

American college football season

1929 Central State Bearcats football
- Conference: Michigan Collegiate Conference
- Record: 2–3–2 (0–3 MCC)
- Head coach: Butch Nowack (1st season)
- Home stadium: Tambling Field

1929 Michigan Collegiate Conference football standings
	Conf.					Overall
Team	W		L		T	W		L		T
Michigan State Normal +	2	–	0	–	1	5	–	1	–	2
Western State Teachers +	2	–	0	–	1	5	–	2	–	1
Detroit City College	1	–	2	–	0	2	–	7	–	0
Central State (MI)	0	–	3	–	0	2	–	3	–	2
+ – Conference co-champions

The 1929 Central State Bearcats football team represented Central State Teachers College, later renamed Central Michigan University, in the Michigan Collegiate Conference (MCC) during the 1929 college football season. The team compiled a 2–3–2 record (0–3 against MCC opponents) and were outscored by opponents by a combined total of 80 to 71. The team lost to its in-state rivals Michigan State Normal (0–24), Western State Teachers (6–25) and Detroit City College (0–6), and played Northern State Teachers to a 6–6 tie.

Butch Nowack was hired as the team's head coach in May 1929. Nowack was an All-American tackle at the University of Illinois under Robert Zuppke, a member of the 1927 Illinois Fighting Illini football team that won the national championship, and captain of the 1928 team that won the Big Ten Conference championship.

== Schedule ==
Date	Opponent	Site	Result	Attendance	Source
September 28	at Detroit Tech	Tambling Field; Mount Pleasant, MI	W 28–7		
October 5	Michigan "B"	Tambling Field; Mount Pleasant, MI	T 0–0		
October 12	at Northern State Teachers (MI)	Marquette, MI	T 6–6		
October 26	at Michigan State Normal	Normal Field; Ypsilanti, MI (rivalry)	L 0–24		
November 9	Western State Teachers^{†}	Mount Pleasant, MI (rivalry)	L 6–25	3,000	
November 16	Toledo	Mount Pleasant, MI	W 31–12		
November 28	at Detroit City College	Central Field; Detroit, MI	L 0–6	3,000	
^{†}Homecoming
