= Michigan Collegiate Conference =

- Founded: 1926
- Folded: 1931
- Sports fielded: 5; men's: 5; women's: 0
- No. of teams: 4
- Region: Michigan

Conference member locations in Michigan

The Michigan Collegiate Conference (MCC) was an athletic conference that existed in the United States for four seasons, from 1927 through 1931.

== History ==
Formed in December 1926, the members were the Michigan State Normal Hurons (now Eastern Michigan University), the Western State Normal Hilltoppers (now Western Michigan University), the Central State Teachers Bearcats (now Central Michigan University), and the College of the City of Detroit Tartars (now Wayne State University).

Sports sponsored by the MCC included baseball, football, men's basketball, track, and tennis.

The conference disbanded at the 1931 annual meeting. Detroit City College had tendered their resignation due their teams not being strong enough in all sports. The remaining members tried to recruit other colleges but were unsuccessful.

== Member schools ==
=== Final members ===
Institution	Location	Founded	Affiliation	Enrollment	Nickname	Joined	Left	Current conference
Central State Teachers College (Note: Currently known as Central Michigan University since 1959.)	Mount Pleasant, Michigan	1892	Public	21,705	Bearcats	1926–27	1930–31	Mid-American (MAC) (NCAA D-I)
College of the City of Detroit (Note: Currently known as Wayne State University since 1956.)	Detroit, Michigan	1868	Public	22,941	Tartars	1926–27	1930–31	Great Lakes (GLIAC) (NCAA D-II)
Michigan State Normal College (Note: Currently known as Eastern Michigan University since 1959.)	Ypsilanti, Michigan	1849	Public	18,838	Hurons	1926–27	1930–31	Mid-American (MAC) (NCAA D-I)
Western State Teachers College (Note: Currently known as Western Michigan University since 1957.)	Kalamazoo, Michigan	1903	Public	22,562	Hilltoppers	1926–27	1930–31	Mid-American (MAC) (NCAA D-I)

== Individual sports ==
=== Football ===
Michigan State Normal won the football championship from 1927 through 1930, sharing the championship with Western State Teachers College for a co-championship in 1929.

=== Baseball ===
Western State Teachers College won the baseball championship four years and tied a fifth year.

=== Basketball ===
Detroit City College won the men's basketball championship in 1927–1928, going 18–1 overall, with their sole loss to Manhattan College. Western State won men's basketball championships in 1930, 1931, and 1932.

== See also ==
- List of Michigan Collegiate Conference football standings
- List of defunct college football conferences
