= 1918 Nebraska Cornhuskers football team =

American college football season

1918 Nebraska Cornhuskers football
- Conference: Missouri Valley Conference
- Record: 2–3–1 (0–0 MVC)
- Head coach: William G. Kline (1st season)
- Home stadium: Nebraska Field

1918 Missouri Valley Conference football standings
Drake	–	3	–	2	–	0
Iowa State	–	0	–	3	–	0
Kansas	–	2	–	2	–	0
Kansas State	–	4	–	1	–	0
Missouri	–	0	–	0	–	0
Nebraska	–	2	–	3	–	1
Washington University	–	6	–	0	–	0
Due to events related to World War I and the 1918 flu pandemic, the Missouri Valley Intercollegiate Athletic Association did not schedule any official conference games, recorded no standings, and awarded no title for 1918. Additionally, Missouri canceled their season.

The 1918 Nebraska Cornhuskers football team represented the University of Nebraska in the 1918 college football season. The team was coached by first-year head coach William G. Kline and played its home games at Nebraska Field in Lincoln, Nebraska. They competed as members of the Missouri Valley Conference, though the conference did not schedule any official games due to the United States' entry into World War I. Only three NU starters from 1917 returned as many were involved in the war effort; the war also limited cross-country travel, and as a result Nebraska played only six games in the 1918 season.

== Schedule ==
Date	Time	Opponent	Site	Result	Source
October 5	2:30 p.m.	Iowa*	Nebraska Field; Lincoln, NE	L 0–12	
October 12		Camp Funston*	Nebraska Field; Lincoln, NE	Canceled	
October 19		Notre Dame*	Nebraska Field; Lincoln, NE (rivalry)	Postponed to Nov. 2	
October 26		at West Virginia*	Morgantown, WV	Canceled	
October 29		Cotner*	Nebraska Field; Lincoln, NE	W 30–0 (exhibition)	
November 2		Notre Dame*	Nebraska Field; Lincoln, NE	Postponed to Nov. 28	
November 9		at Missouri	Rollins Field; Columbia, MO (rivalry)	Canceled	
November 9	2:30 p.m.	Omaha Balloon*	Nebraska Field; Lincoln, NE	W 19–0	
November 16	2:30 p.m.	Kansas^{†}	Nebraska Field; Lincoln, NE (rivalry)	W 20–0	
November 23		Northwestern*	Nebraska Field; Lincoln, NE	Canceled	
November 23	2:30 p.m.	Camp Dodge*	Nebraska Field; Lincoln, NE	L 7–23	
November 28		Syracuse*	Nebraska Field; Lincoln, NE	Canceled	
November 28	2:30 p.m.	Notre Dame*	Nebraska Field; Lincoln, NE (rivalry)	T 0–0	
December 7	2:45 p.m.	at Washington University*	Francis Field; St. Louis, MO	L 7–20	
*Non-conference game; ^{†}Homecoming; All times are in Central time

== Coaching staff ==
Coach	Position	First year	Alma mater
William G. Kline	Head coach	1918	Illinois
Paul J. Schissler	Assistant coach	1918	
R. D. Scott	Manager	1918	
Jack Best	Trainer	1890	Nebraska

== Roster ==
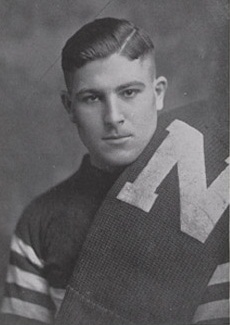
Ernest Hubka from 1919 Cornhusker

Cypreanson, Clarence PLAYER
Dana, Herbert E
Dobson, Paul HB
Howarth, Harry QB
Hoyt, Charles G
Hubka, Ernest FB
Jobes, Raymond HB
Kline PLAYER
Lanphere, Edward E
Lantz, William PLAYER
Lyman, Roy Link T
McMahon, Harold HB
Munn, Monte G
Munn, Wade G
Newman, Richard QB
Reynolds, Harry FB
Ross, Emmett G
Schellenberg, Elmer HB
Schissler PLAYER
Swanson, Clarence E

== Game summaries ==
=== Iowa ===
Iowa at Nebraska

Team	1	2	3	4	Total
• Iowa	0	0	12	0	12
Nebraska	0	0	0	0	0

- Date: October 5
- Location: Nebraska Field, Lincoln, NE
- Game start: 2:30 p.m.

Prior to Nebraska's 1918 season-opener against Iowa, the MVIAA announced that, for the first time, freshmen athletes would be permitted to participate in football games. The change was necessitated by the number of upperclassmen who were unavailable to play due to World War I or the Spanish flu. Nebraska drove to Iowa's one-yard line in the first quarter but was unable to come away with any points on what would be NU's only significant scoring chance of the day. Iowa scraped together twelve third-quarter points to win the game 12–0.

=== Omaha Balloon ===
Omaha Balloon at Nebraska

Team	1	2	3	4	Total
Omaha Balloon	0	0	0	0	0
• Nebraska	6	7	0	6	19

- Date: November 9
- Location: Nebraska Field, Lincoln, NE
- Game start: 2:30 p.m.

Two weeks prior to NU's game against the Omaha Balloon school, a training facility for Army personnel involved in the operation of dirigibles, team captain-elect Roscoe Rhodes was killed in action on October 25. The game itself was Nebraska's first in over a month; the Cornhuskers shut out the Balloon school 19–0. Nebraska halfback Elmer Schellenberg, who scored NU's second touchdown, left the team the following week to join an officers' training school. This was the only meeting between Nebraska and the Omaha Balloon School.

=== Kansas ===
Kansas at Nebraska

Team	1	2	3	4	Total
Kansas	0	0	0	0	0
• Nebraska	2	12	6	0	20

- Date: November 16
- Location: Nebraska Field, Lincoln, NE
- Game start: 2:30 p.m.

The field was so muddy for Nebraska's meeting with Kansas that the school's yearbook wrote that "the players were so completely smeared with slime that neither side could be distinguished from the other." Kansas allowed a safety on a punt attempt in the first quarter, the only scoring in the first half. Nebraska, after changing into clean uniforms at halftime, pulled away in the third quarter to win 20–0.

=== Camp Dodge ===
Camp Dodge at Nebraska

Team	1	2	Total
• Camp Dodge			23
Nebraska			7

- Date: November 23
- Location: Nebraska Field, Lincoln, NE
- Game start: 2:30 p.m.

Despite a significant advantage in yardage gained, Nebraska trailed 6–0 at halftime. The Cornhuskers briefly took the lead in the third quarter, but a series of late errors and missed opportunities cost Nebraska as the "Dodgers" defeated the Cornhuskers 23–7. This was the only meeting between Camp Dodge and Nebraska.

=== Notre Dame ===
Notre Dame at Nebraska

Team	1	2	3	4	Total
Notre Dame	0	0	0	0	0
Nebraska	0	0	0	0	0

- Date: November 28
- Location: Nebraska Field, Lincoln, NE
- Game start: 2:30 p.m.

When the Armistice of 11 November 1918 ended World War I, American travel restrictions were eased and Notre Dame was able to travel to Lincoln to play a game that had twice been canceled throughout the season. NU struggled mightily to move the ball on a sloppy Nebraska Field, punting eighteen times and gaining just nine net yards of offense. Knute Rockne's first Notre Dame was also unable to get on the scoreboard, and the game ended in a 0–0 draw.

=== At Washington University ===
Nebraska at Washington University

Team	1	2	Total
Nebraska			7
• Washington University			20

- Date: December 7
- Location: Francis Olympic Field, St. Louis, MO
- Game start: 2:30 p.m.

Nebraska was able to add a sixth and final game to its 1918 schedule, a postseason charity game against Washington University. The Pikers, led by former Nebraska star John Rutherford, scored twenty unanswered points following an early NU touchdown to win 20–7. This was the first meeting between Nebraska and Washington University, despite several years of shared conference affiliation.

=== Canceled Games ===
Due to wartime travel restrictions and the influenza outbreak of 1918, Nebraska's scheduled games with Syracuse, Missouri, and West Virginia were canceled. The Cornhuskers resumed their annual series with Missouri in 1919, and played Syracuse the following season as well; Nebraska did not face West Virginia until the 1994 Kickoff Classic.
