= 1918 Akron football team =

American college football season

1918 Akron football
- Conference: Ohio Athletic Conference
- Record: 2–2–1 (1–2–1 OAC)
- Head coach: Fred Sefton (4th season)
- Captain: Tommy Tomkinson
- Home stadium: Buchtel Field

1918 Ohio Athletic Conference football standings
	Conf.					Overall
Team	W		L		T	W		L		T
Wittenberg $	3	–	0	–	0	4	–	0	–	0
Miami (OH)	4	–	0	–	1	5	–	0	–	1
Mount Union	5	–	1	–	0	6	–	1	–	0
Wooster	5	–	1	–	0	6	–	1	–	0
Western Reserve	5	–	1	–	0	5	–	2	–	0
Ohio	1	–	0	–	1	4	–	0	–	1
Cincinnati	0	–	0	–	2	3	–	0	–	2
Ohio Wesleyan	2	–	2	–	0	3	–	2	–	0
Case	2	–	3	–	2	3	–	5	–	2
Akron	1	–	2	–	1	2	–	2	–	1
Oberlin	1	–	4	–	0	1	–	4	–	0
Baldwin–Wallace	0	–	4	–	1	5	–	4	–	1
Kenyon	0	–	4	–	0	1	–	4	–	0
Ohio Northern	0	–	5	–	0	1	–	5	–	0
Denison	0	–	5	–	0	1	–	6	–	0
Ohio State *	3	–	0	–	0	3	–	3	–	0
$ – Conference champion; * – did not complete for championship

The 1918 Akron football team represented the University of Akron, formerly Buchtel College, in the 1918 college football season. The team was led by head coach Fred Sefton, in his fourth season. Akron outscored their opponents by a total of 69–47.

The season was shortened to just five games due to the outbreak of the worldwide influenza epidemic.

== Schedule ==
Date	Opponent	Site	Result
September 28	Muskingum*	Buchtel Field; Akron, OH	W 39–0
October 2	at Mount Union	Alliance, OH	L 0–20
October 9	Baldwin–Wallace	Buchtel Field; Akron, OH	W 30–0
October 12	Western Reserve		Cancelled
October 16	Wooster	Buchtel Field; Akron, OH	L 0–26
October 23	Case	Buchtel Field; Akron, OH	T 0–0
*Non-conference game
