= Thomas Andrew Gill =

American athlete and coach (1886–1947)

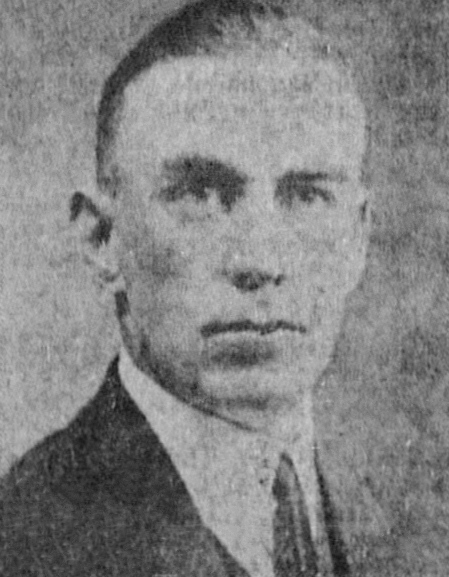
- Gill pictured in the Star Tribune, 1914

Biographical details
- Born: January 23, 1887; Washington, Indiana, U.S.
- Died: March 8, 1947 (aged 60); Daytona Beach, Florida, U.S.

Playing career

Football
- 1909–1911: Indiana

Baseball
- 1909–1912: Indiana
- 1915: Winston-Salem Twins
- 1920: Saskatoon Quakers
- Positions: Halfback, quarterback (football); Second baseman, shortstop (baseball)

Coaching career (HC unless noted)

Football
- 1912: Lombard
- 1913: Albion
- 1914–1917: North Dakota
- 1918–1919: Kentucky
- 1921–1940: Elston HS (IN)

Men's basketball
- 1913–1914: Albion
- 1914–1918: North Dakota
- 1918–1919: Kentucky

Women's basketball
- 1918–1919: Kentucky

Baseball
- 1914: Albion
- 1915–1916: North Dakota
- 1918–1919: Kentucky

Head coaching record
- Overall: 20–27–3 (college football); 49–27 (men's college basketball)

Thomas Andrew Gill (January 23, 1887 – March 8, 1947) was an American football and baseball player, and coach of football, basketball, and baseball.

Gill was also an athlete at Indiana University, where he competed in football, baseball, basketball, and track and field.

== Coaching career ==
Gill was the head football coach at Lombard College in Galesburg, Illinois in 1912 and at Albion College in Albion, Michigan in 1913. He also coached Albion's baseball team in the spring of 1914. In May 1914, Gill was hired to coach football, basketball, at baseball at University of North Dakota in Grand Forks, North Dakota.

Gill served as the head football coach at Kentucky from 1918 to 1919, compiled a 5–5–1 record His 1918 team won two games, at Indiana, 24–7, and at Georgetown of Kentucky, 21–3. They lost at Vanderbilt, 33–0. A subsequent game against Centre and the remainder of the season were canceled due to the 1918 flu pandemic. Gill's 1919 team was 3–4–1, with wins against Georgetown, 1919 Sewanee Tigers football team and Tennessee and losses to Indiana, Ohio State, Cincinnati and Centre, while tying Vanderbilt, 0–0.

Gill coached the Kentucky Wildcats men's basketball team in 1918–19, finishing with a 6–8 record.

== Death and honors ==
Gill died at the age 60, on March 8, 1947, in Daytona Beach, Florida. He was inducted into the Indiana Football Hall of Fame in 2007.

== Head coaching record ==
=== College football ===
Year	Team	Overall	Conference	Standing	Bowl/playoffs
Lombard Olive (Illinois Intercollegiate Athletic Conference) (1912)
1912	Lombard	0–6			
Albion (Michigan Intercollegiate Athletic Association) (1913)
1913	Albion	3–3–1	3–2–1	4th	
Albion:		3–3–1	3–2–1		
North Dakota Flickertails (Independent) (1914–1917)
1914	North Dakota	3–5			
1915	North Dakota	2–2–3			
1916	North Dakota	5–2			
1917	North Dakota	2–4			
North Dakota:		12–13–1			
Kentucky Wildcats (Independent) (1918)
1918	Kentucky	2–1			
Kentucky Wildcats (Southern Intercollegiate Athletic Association) (1919)
1919	Kentucky	3–4–1	3–1–1	5th	
Kentucky:		5–5–1	3–1–1		
Total:		20–27–3			
