= 1919 Georgia Tech Golden Tornado football team =

American college football season

1919 Georgia Tech Golden Tornado football
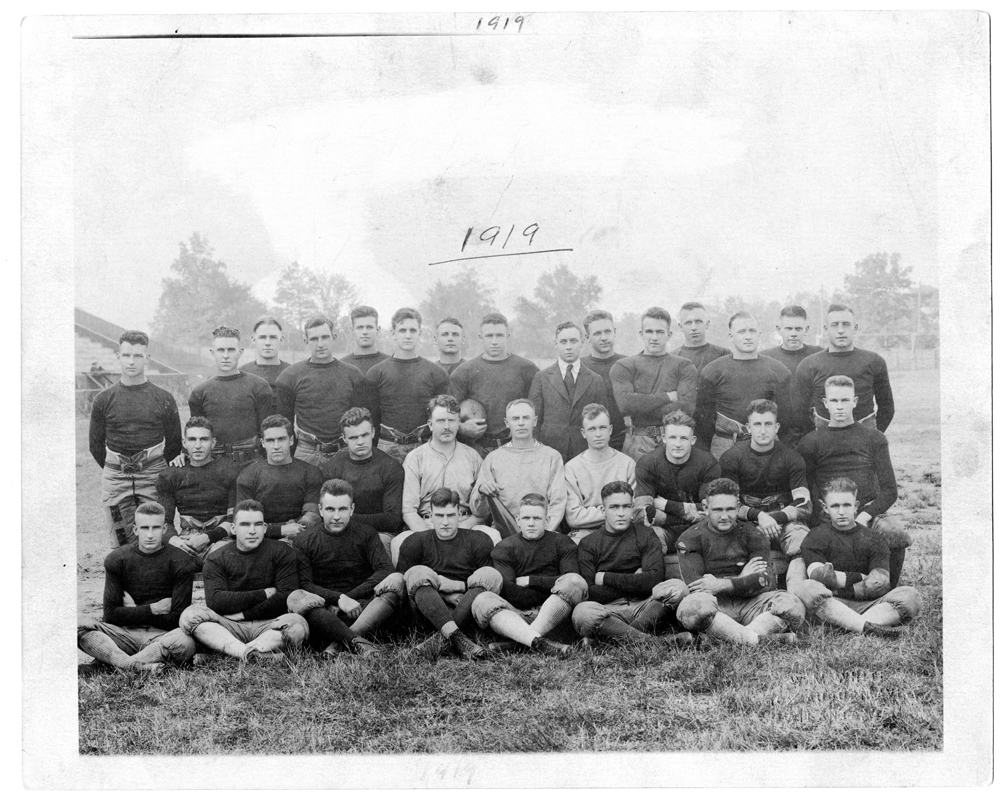
- Conference: Southern Intercollegiate Athletic Association
- Record: 7–3 (3–1 SIAA)
- Head coach: John Heisman (16th season)
- Offensive scheme: Jump shift
- Captain: Pup Phillips
- Home stadium: Grant Field

1919 Southern Intercollegiate Athletic Association football standings
	Conf.					Overall
Team	W		L		T	W		L		T
Auburn $	5	–	1	–	0	8	–	1	–	0
Alabama	6	–	1	–	0	8	–	1	–	0
Centre	1	–	0	–	0	9	–	0	–	0
Kentucky	3	–	1	–	1	3	–	4	–	1
Georgia Tech	3	–	1	–	0	7	–	3	–	0
Tulane	3	–	1	–	1	6	–	2	–	1
Vanderbilt	3	–	1	–	2	5	–	1	–	2
Furman	2	–	1	–	1	6	–	2	–	1
Mississippi A&M	5	–	2	–	0	6	–	2	–	0
Georgia	4	–	2	–	2	4	–	2	–	3
LSU	3	–	2	–	0	6	–	2	–	0
Clemson	3	–	2	–	2	6	–	2	–	2
Florida	2	–	2	–	0	5	–	3	–	0
Wofford	1	–	1	–	0	3	–	2	–	1
Transylvania	1	–	1	–	0	2	–	4	–	0
Ole Miss	1	–	4	–	0	4	–	4	–	0
The Citadel	1	–	4	–	0	4	–	4	–	1
Sewanee	1	–	4	–	0	3	–	6	–	0
Georgetown (KY)	0	–	0	–	0	0	–	2	–	0
Tennessee	0	–	3	–	2	3	–	3	–	3
South Carolina	0	–	4	–	1	1	–	7	–	1
Mercer	0	–	1	–	0	0	–	2	–	0
Mississippi College	0	–	4	–	0	3	–	5	–	1
Howard (AL)	0	–	4	–	0	3	–	5	–	2
$ – Conference champion

The 1919 Georgia Tech Golden Tornado football team (Note: Although Georgia Tech's teams are officially known as the "Yellow Jackets", northern writers called the team the "Golden Tornado" in 1917; the name was commonly used until 1928 and for many years afterwards as an alternate nickname. It may have been coined by Morgan Blake.) represented the Georgia Tech Golden Tornado of the Georgia Institute of Technology during the 1919 Southern Intercollegiate Athletic Association football season. The Tornado was coached by John Heisman in his 15th year as head coach, compiling a record of 7–3 (3–1 SIAA) and outscoring opponents 257 to 33.

== Before the season ==
Jack McDonough started at quarterback as a true freshman when Marshall Guill was moved to end. Pup Phillips was captain.

== Schedule ==
Date	Opponent	Site	Result	Attendance	Source
September 27	Furman	Grant Field; Atlanta, GA	W 74–0		
October 4	Camp Gordon*	Grant Field; Atlanta, GA	W 48–0		
October 4	Wake Forest*	Grant Field; Atlanta, GA	W 14–0		
October 11	Clemson	Grant Field; Atlanta, GA (rivalry)	W 28–0	5,000	
October 18	Vanderbilt	Grant Field; Atlanta, GA (rivalry)	W 20–0		
October 25	at Pittsburgh*	Forbes Field; Pittsburgh, PA	L 6–16		
November 1	Davidson*	Grant Field; Atlanta, GA	W 33–0		
November 8	Washington & Lee*	Grant Field; Atlanta, GA	L 0–3		
November 15	Georgetown*	Grant Field; Atlanta, GA	W 27–0		
November 27	Auburn	Grant Field; Atlanta, GA (rivalry)	L 7-14		
*Non-conference game

== Game summaries ==
=== Camp Logan ===
The season opened with a 48–0 defeat of Camp Logan.

=== Furman ===
In the second week of play, Tech swamped Furman, 74–0.

=== Wake Forest ===
Tech beat Wake Forest 14–0.

=== Clemson ===
Week 4: Clemson @ Georgia Tech

Team	1	2	3	4	Total
Clemson	0	0	0	0	0
• Ga. Tech	0	0	14	14	28

- Date: October 11
- Location: Grant Field
  Atlanta, GA
- Game attendance: 5,000
- Referee: Jogger Elcock

After being held scoreless in the first half, Tech beat Clemson 28–0. The entire backfield, as well Fincher, Lebey, and Higgins in the line, were cited as stars of the game. The play of Tech seemed stimulated in the second half by the substitution of Shorty Guill. The first touchdown was the best run of the game, for 26 yards around left end, Flowers "sidestepped, ducked, twisted and turned until he had again crossed the field almost to the opposite side and then stiff-arming the last man in his way, crossed the goal for a touchdown." Red Barron went around right end for 35 yards and the second touchdown. A 15-yard pass from Flowers to Bill Fincher netted the third touchdown. Ferst went back in for Guill and got the last touchdown on a 12-yard buck behind left guard.

The starting lineup was: Fincher (left end), Higgins (left tackle), Lebey (left guard), Phillips (center), Dowling (right guard), Lyman (right tackle), Staton (right end), McDonough (quarterback), Flowers (left halfback), Barron (right halfback), Gaiver (fullback).

=== Vanderbilt ===
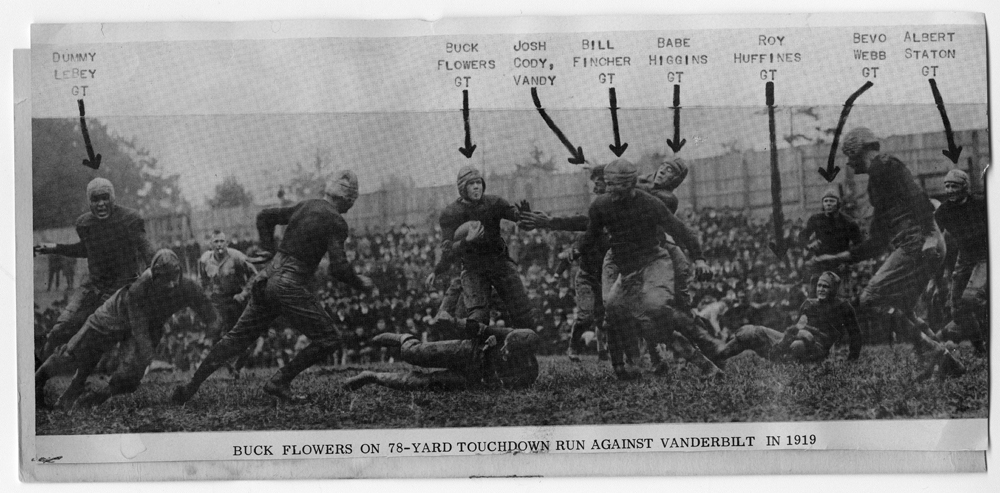
Tech-Vanderbilt

Tech beat Dan McGugin's Vanderbilt Commodores in the mud 20–0, giving the Commodores their only loss on the season. Buck Flowers and fullback Bill Giaver starred.

The starting lineup was: Fincher (left end), Higgins (left tackle), Lebey (left guard), Amis (center), Dowling (right guard), Huffines (right tackle), Staton (right end), Guill (quarterback), Flowers (left halfback), Barron (right halfback), Gavier (fullback).

=== Pittsburgh ===
Tech was beaten 16–6 by Pop Warner's Pittsburgh Panthers, the first team to score on Tech all year.

=== Davidson ===
Tech beat Davidson 33–0, Flowers running around his old teammates.

=== Washington & Lee ===
Quarterback Jim Mattox made the field goal to help Washington & Lee upset Tech. the first loss to a Southern team since 1914 for Tech.

The starting lineup was: Fincher (left end), Doyal (left tackle), Lebey (left guard), Phillips (center), Dowling (right guard), Higgins (right tackle), Staton (right end), Guill (quarterback), Flowers (left halfback), Ferst (right halfback), Gavier (fullback).

=== Georgetown ===
Dewey Scarboro returned a kickoff 102 yards for a touchdown in the 27–0 win over Georgetown.

=== Auburn ===
Week 10: Auburn @ Georgia Tech

Team	1	2	3	4	Total
• Auburn	0	2	6	6	14
Ga. Tech	7	0	0	0	7

- Date: November 27
- Location: Grant Field
  Atlanta, GA
- Referee: Jogger Elcock

The Auburn Tigers beat Tech 14–7, its first loss to an SIAA school in five years. The first touchdown of the game was made by Jack McDonough. Judy Harlan later fell on his own punt for a safety. In the third quarter, Warren blocked a Dewey Scarboro punt and Sloan recovered the ball and ran it 35 yards for a touchdown. Auburn's Fatty Warren "waddled" for a 40-yard touchdown off a blocked punt in the victory.

The starting lineup was Guill (left end), Fincher (left tackle), Lebey (left guard), Phillips (center), Dowling (right guard), Huffines (right tackle), Staton (right end), McDonough (quarterback), Barron (left halfback), Ferst (right halfback), Harlan (fullback).

== Postseason ==
After a divorce in 1919, Heisman left Atlanta to prevent any social embarrassment to his former wife, who chose to remain in the city. He picked Bill Alexander as successor and went back to the University of Pennsylvania for three seasons, from 1920 to 1922.
