= 1919 Southern Intercollegiate Athletic Association football season =

- League: NCAA
- Sport: College football
- Duration: September 27, 1919 through November 27, 1919
- Teams: 23

Regular Season
- Season champions: Auburn

Football seasons
- ← 1918 1920 →

1919 Southern Intercollegiate Athletic Association football standings
	Conf.					Overall
Team	W		L		T	W		L		T
Auburn $	5	–	1	–	0	8	–	1	–	0
Alabama	6	–	1	–	0	8	–	1	–	0
Centre	1	–	0	–	0	9	–	0	–	0
Kentucky	3	–	1	–	1	3	–	4	–	1
Georgia Tech	3	–	1	–	0	7	–	3	–	0
Tulane	3	–	1	–	1	6	–	2	–	1
Vanderbilt	3	–	1	–	2	5	–	1	–	2
Furman	2	–	1	–	1	6	–	2	–	1
Mississippi A&M	5	–	2	–	0	6	–	2	–	0
Georgia	4	–	2	–	2	4	–	2	–	3
LSU	3	–	2	–	0	6	–	2	–	0
Clemson	3	–	2	–	2	6	–	2	–	2
Florida	2	–	2	–	0	5	–	3	–	0
Wofford	1	–	1	–	0	3	–	2	–	1
Transylvania	1	–	1	–	0	2	–	4	–	0
Ole Miss	1	–	4	–	0	4	–	4	–	0
The Citadel	1	–	4	–	0	4	–	4	–	1
Sewanee	1	–	4	–	0	3	–	6	–	0
Georgetown (KY)	0	–	0	–	0	0	–	2	–	0
Tennessee	0	–	3	–	2	3	–	3	–	3
South Carolina	0	–	4	–	1	1	–	7	–	1
Mercer	0	–	1	–	0	0	–	2	–	0
Mississippi College	0	–	4	–	0	3	–	5	–	1
Howard (AL)	0	–	4	–	0	3	–	5	–	2
$ – Conference champion

The 1919 Southern Intercollegiate Athletic Association football season was the college football games played by the member schools of the Southern Intercollegiate Athletic Association as part of the 1919 college football season. The season began on September 27.

Auburn was widely regarded as the SIAA champion, though Centre was undefeated in all its games. Both claim titles. For defeating Tech and due to charges of professionalism aimed at Centre, as Fuzzy Woodruff recalls "Auburn claimed it. "We defeated Tech" said Auburn. "Yes, but we defeated you" said Vanderbilt. "Yes", said Alabama, "but Tech, Tulane, and Tennessee took your measure. We defeated Georgia Tech, who tied Tulane, so we are champions...The newspapers, however, more or less generally supported the claim of Auburn..."

== Regular season ==
Index to colors and formatting
Non-conference matchup; SIAA member won
Non-conference matchup; SIAA member lost
Non-conference matchup; tie
Conference matchup

SIAA teams in bold.

=== Week One ===
Date	Visiting team	Home team	Site	Result	Attendance	Reference
September 20	Camp Logan	**Georgia Tech**	Grant Field • Atlanta	**W** 48–0		

=== Week Two ===
Date	Visiting team	Home team	Site	Result	Attendance	Reference
September 27	Marion	**Auburn**	Drake Field • Auburn, Alabama	**W** 37–0		
September 27	Erskine	**Clemson**	Riggs Field • Calhoun, South Carolina	**W** 53–0		
September 27	**Furman**	**Georgia Tech**	Grant Field • Atlanta	**GT** 74–0		
September 27	Chamberlain Hunt	**Mississippi College**		**W** 57–0		
September 27	**Howard**	Morgan		**W** 31–0		
September 27	Presbyterian	**South Carolina**	Columbia, South Carolina	**L** 6–0		
September 27	Tusculum	**Tennessee**	Waite Field • Knoxville, Tennessee	**W** 29–6		

=== Week Three ===
Date	Visiting team	Home team	Site	Result	Attendance	Reference
October 3	Davidson	**Clemson**	Riggs Field • Calhoun, South Carolina	**W** 7–0		
October 3	Maryville	**Tennessee**	Waite Field • Knoxville, Tennessee	**W** 32–2		
October 4	Birmingham–Southern	**Alabama**	Denny Field • Tuscaloosa, Alabama	**W** 27–0		
October 4	**Auburn**	**Howard**	Rickwood Field • Birmingham, Alabama	**AUB** 19–6		
October 4	North Georgia	**Florida**	Fleming Field • Gainesville, Florida	**W** 33–2		
October 4	Oglethorpe	**Furman**	Manly Field • Greenville, South Carolina	**W** 41–0		
October 4	**The Citadel**	**Georgia**	Sanford Field • Athens, Georgia	**UGA** 28–0		
October 4	Wake Forest	**Georgia Tech**	Grant Field • Atlanta	**W** 14–0		
October 4	**Georgetown**	**Kentucky**	Stoll Field • Lexington, Kentucky	**UK** 12–0		
October 4	Louisiana-Lafayette	**LSU**	State Field • Baton Rouge, Louisiana	**W** 39–0		
October 4	Arkansas State	**Ole Miss**	Hemingway Stadium • Oxford, Mississippi	**W** 32–0		
October 4	Hendrix	**Mississippi College**		**L** 15–12		
October 4	Spring Hill	**Mississippi A&M**	Davis Wade Stadium • Starkville, Mississippi	**W** 12–6		
October 4	**Wofford**	Guilford	Greensboro, North Carolina	**T** 6–6		
October 4	Morgan	**Sewanee**	McGee Field • Sewanee, Tennessee	**W** 7–0		
October 4	Jefferson	**Tulane**	Second Tulane Stadium • New Orleans	**W** 27–0		
October 4	Union (TN)	**Vanderbilt**	Dudley Field • Nashville, Tennessee	**W** 41–0		

=== Week Four ===
Date	Visiting team	Home team	Site	Result	Attendance	Reference
October 11	**Ole Miss**	Alabama	Denny Field • Tuscaloosa, Alabama	**ALA** 49–0		
October 11	**Wofford**	Furman	Manly Field • Greenville, South Carolina	**FUR** 7–6		
October 11	Presbyterian	The Citadel	College Park Stadium • Charleston, South Carolina	**W** 12–7		
October 11	**South Carolina**	Georgia	Sanford Field • Athens, Georgia	**UGA** 14–0		
October 11	**Clemson**	Georgia Tech	Grant Field • Atlanta	**GT** 28–0		
October 11	Indiana	Kentucky	Stoll Field • Lexington, Kentucky	**L** 24–0		
October 11	**Mississippi College**	Mississippi A&M	Davis Wade Stadium • Starkville, Mississippi	**MSA&M** 56–7		
October 11	Jefferson	LSU	State Field • Baton Rouge, Louisiana	**W** 40–0		
October 11	**Howard**	Sewanee	McGee Field • Sewanee, Tennessee	**SEW** 18–0		
October 11	**Tennessee**	Vanderbilt	Dudley Field • Nashville, Tennessee	**T** 3–3		
October 11	Louisiana-Lafayette	Tulane	Second Tulane Stadium • New Orleans, Louisiana	**W** 73–0		
October 12	Camp Gordon	Auburn	Drake Field • Auburn, Alabama	**W** 25–13		

=== Week Five ===
Date	Visiting team	Home team	Site	Result	Attendance	Reference
October 17	**Clemson**	**Auburn**	Drake Field • Auburn, Alabama	**AUB** 7–0		
October 18	**Howard**	**Alabama**	Denny Field • Tuscaloosa, Alabama	**ALA** 48–0		
October 18	**Mercer**	**Florida**	Fleming Field • Gainesville, Florida	**FLA** 48–0		
October 18	Presbyterian	**Furman**	Manly Field • Greenville, South Carolina	**W** 6–0		
October 18	**Ole Miss**	**LSU**	Birmingham, Alabama	**LSU** 13–0		
October 18	Jefferson	**Mississippi College**		**W** 6–0		
October 18	**Georgia Tech**	**Vanderbilt**	Dudley Field • Nashville, Tennessee	**GT** 20–0		
October 16	Centre	**Transylvania**	• Lexington, Kentucky	**L** 55–0		
October 16	**Mercer**	**Howard**		**HOW** 33–13		
October 18	**Sewanee**	**Georgia**	Sanford Field • Athens, Georgia	**UGA** 13–0		
October 18	**Mississippi A&M**	**Tennessee**	Waite Field • Knoxville, Tennessee	**TENN** 35–0		
October 18	**Kentucky**	Ohio State	Ohio Field • Columbus, Ohio	**L** 49–0		
October 18	**Tulane**	Spring Hill	Mobile, Alabama	**W** 21–0		
October 18	**The Citadel**	**Wofford**	Spartanburg, South Carolina	**WOF** 12–6		

=== Week Six ===
Date	Visiting team	Home team	Site	Result	Attendance	Reference
October 24	Marion	**Alabama**	Denny Field • Tuscaloosa, Alabama	**W** 61–0		
October 25	Centre	**Transylvania**	Lexington, Kentucky	**L** 69–0		
October 23	**Vanderbilt**	**Auburn**	Rickwood Field • Birmingham, Alabama	**VAN** 7–6		
October 25	**Tennessee**	**Clemson**	Riggs Field • Calhoun, South Carolina	**CLEM** 14–0		
October 25	USS Mercy	**The Citadel**	College Park Stadium • Charleston, South Carolina	**W** 13–12		
October 25	Wake Forest	**Furman**	Manly Field • Greenville, South Carolina	**W** 39–7		
October 25	**Georgia**	**Florida**	Tampa, Florida	**UGA** 16–0		
October 25	Arkansas	**LSU**	Shreveport, Louisiana	**W** 20–0		
October 25	**Howard**	**Mississippi A&M**	Davis Wade Stadium • Starkville, Mississippi	**MSA&M** 39–0		
October 25	**Mercer**	Oglethorpe		**L** 75–0		
October 25	**Georgia Tech**	Pittsburgh	Forbes Field • Pittsburgh, Pennsylvania	**L** 16–6		
October 25	**Kentucky**	**Sewanee**	McGee Field • Sewanee, Tennessee	**UK** 6–0		
October 25	**Ole Miss**	**Tulane**	Tulane Stadium • New Orleans	**TUL** 27–12		
October 25	**Wofford**	Newberry	Newberry, South Carolina	**W** 27–0		

=== Week Seven ===
Date	Visiting team	Home team	Site	Result	Attendance	Reference
October 30	**Clemson**	South Carolina	Columbia, South Carolina	**CLEM** 19–6		
October 30	Hamilton A. C.	Howard		**T** 7–7		
October 31	Union (TN)	Ole Miss	Hemingway Stadium • Oxford, Mississippi	**W** 25–6		
November 1	Florida Southern	Florida	St. Petersburg, Florida	**L** 7–0		
November 1	**The Citadel**	Furman	Manly Field • Greenville, South Carolina	**FUR** 21–6		
November 1	**Auburn**	Georgia	McClung Stadium • Columbus, Georgia	**UGA** 7–0		
November 1	Davidson	Georgia Tech	Grant Field • Atlanta	**W** 24–0		
November 1	**Sewanee**	Alabama	Rickwood Field • Birmingham, Alabama	**ALA** 40–0		
November 1	**Mississippi College**	Tulane	Tulane Stadium • New Orleans	**TUL** 49–0		
November 1	**LSU**	Mississippi A&M	Scott Field • Starkville, Mississippi	**MSA&M** 6–0		
November 1	**Kentucky**	Vanderbilt	Dudley Field • Nashville, Tennessee	**T** 0–0		
November 1	Erskine	Wofford	Spartanburg, South Carolina	**W** 19–0		

=== Week Eight ===
Date	Visiting team	Home team	Site	Result	Attendance	Reference
November 7	**Georgia**	Virginia	Lambeth Field •Charlottesville, Virginia	**T** 7–7		
November 7	Presbyterian	**Clemson**	Riggs Field • Calhoun, South Carolina	**W** 19–7		
November 8	**Auburn**	Spring Hill	Mobile, Alabama	**W** 10–0		
November 8	**The Citadel**	Newberry	Newberry, South Carolina	**W** 41–0		
November 8	Birmingham–Southern	**Howard**		**W** 2–0		
November 8	**Kentucky**	Cincinnati	Cincinnati	**L** 7–0		
November 8	**Mississippi College**	**LSU**	State Field • Baton Rouge, Louisiana	**LSU** 24–0		
November 8	**Ole Miss**	**Mississippi A&M**	Clarksdale, Mississippi	**MSA&M** 33–0		
November 8	Oglethorpe	**Sewanee**	McGee Field • Sewanee, Tennessee	**W** 21–0		
November 8	**Florida**	**Tulane**	Tulane Stadium • New Orleans	**TUL** 14–2		
November 8	**South Carolina**	**Tennessee**	Waite Field • Knoxville, Tennessee	**T** 6–6		
November 8	**Alabama**	**Vanderbilt**	Dudley Field • Nashville, Tennessee	**VAN** 16–12		
November 8	Washington & Lee	**Georgia Tech**	Grant Field • Atlanta	**L** 3–0		

=== Week Nine ===
Date	Visiting team	Home team	Site	Result	Attendance	Reference
November 13	**Clemson**	**The Citadel**	County Fairgrounds • Orangeburg, South Carolina	**CLEM** 33–0		
November 14	Marion	**Howard**		**L** 12–0		
November 15	**Alabama**	**LSU**	State Field • Baton Rouge, Louisiana	**ALA** 23–0		
November 15	**Mississippi A&M**	**Auburn**	Rickwood Field • Birmingham, Alabama	**AUB** 7–0		
November 15	Centre	**Kentucky**	Stoll Field • Lexington, Kentucky	**L** 56–0		
November 15	Stetson	**Florida**	Fleming Field • Gainesville, Florida	**W** 64–0		
November 15	Erskine	**Furman**	Manly Field • Greenville, South Carolina	**W** 41–0		
November 15	Georgetown	**Georgia Tech**	Grant Field • Atlanta	**W** 27–0		
November 15	Rhodes	**Ole Miss**	Hemingway Stadium • Oxford, Mississippi	**W** 30–0		
November 15	Cincinnati	**Tennessee**	Waite Field • Knoxville, Tennessee	**W** 33–12		
November 15	**Sewanee**	Rice	McGee Field • Sewanee, Tennessee	**L** 19–7		
November 15	**Tulane**	**Georgia**	Augusta, Georgia	**T** 7–7		
November 15	**Vanderbilt**	Virginia	Lambeth Field • Charlottesville, Virginia	**W** 10–6		
November 15	Presbyterian	**Wofford**	Spartanburg, South Carolina	**W** 14–6		
November 17	**Mississippi College**	Southern Miss		**W** 19–7		

=== Week Ten ===
Date	Visiting team	Home team	Site	Result	Attendance	Reference
November 18	**Sewanee**	Baylor	Waco, Texas	**L** 21–7		
November 18	Oglethorpe	**The Citadel**	College Park Stadium • Charleston, South Carolina	**T** 0–0		
November 21	**Clemson**	**Furman**	Manly Field • Greenville, South Carolina	**T** 7–7		
November 21	Hamilton A. C.	**Howard**		**W** 82–0		
November 22	**Alabama**	**Georgia**	Ponce de Leon Park • Atlanta	**UGA** 21–14		
November 22	**Florida**	**South Carolina**	Columbia, South Carolina	**FLA** 13–0		
November 22	**Tulane**	**LSU**	State Field • Baton Rouge, Louisiana	**LSU** 27–6		

=== Week Eleven ===
Date	Visiting team	Home team	Site	Result	Attendance	Reference
November 26	Spring Hill	**Howard**		**T** 6–6		
November 25	**Georgetown**	Centre	Cheek Field • Danville, Kentucky	**L** 103–0		
November 25	**Wofford**	Duke	Durham, North Carolina	**T** 0–0		
November 27	**Auburn**	**Georgia Tech**	Grant Field • Atlanta	**AUB** 14–7		
November 27	**Mississippi A&M**	**Alabama**	Rickwood Field • Birmingham, Alabama	**ALA** 14–6		
November 27	Centre	**Georgetown**	Georgetown, Kentucky	**L** 77–7		
November 27	**The Citadel**	**South Carolina**	Columbia, South Carolina	**CIT** 14–7		
November 27	**Clemson**	**Georgia**	Sanford Field • Athens, Georgia	**T** 0–0		
November 27	**Furman**	Davidson	Davidson, North Carolina	**L** 41–14		
November 27	Oglethorpe	**Florida**	Fleming Field • Gainesville, Florida	**W** 14–7		
November 27	**Tennessee**	**Kentucky**	Stoll Field • Lexington, Kentucky	**UK** 13–0		
November 27	**Ole Miss**	**Mississippi College**	Jackson, Mississippi	**MISS** 6–0		
November 27	Washington & Lee	**Tulane**	Tulane Stadium • New Orleans, Louisiana	**L** 7–0		
November 27	**Sewanee**	**Vanderbilt**	Dudley Field • Nashville, Tennessee	**VAN** 33–21		

== Awards and honors ==
=== All-Americans ===
- T – Josh Cody, Vanderbilt (WC-3; DJ-1)
- C – Pup Phillips, Georgia Tech (DJ-1)
- C – Bum Day, Georgia (DJ-2)

=== All-Southern team ===
The following includes the composite All-Southern team posted by H. J. Stegeman, coach at the University of Georgia, for Spalding's Football Guide.

Position	Name	First-team selectors	Team
QB	Bo McMillin	S, NYS	Centre
HB	Buck Flowers	S	Georgia Tech
HB	Mullie Lenoir	S, NYS	Alabama
FB	Judy Harlan	S	Georgia Tech
E	Alfred T. Adams	S, NYS	Vanderbilt
T	Josh Cody	S, NYS	Vanderbilt
G	Fatty Warren	S	Auburn
C	Bum Day	S	Georgia
T	Pete Bonner	S	Auburn
T	Artie Pew	S	Georgia
E	Bill Fincher	S	Georgia Tech
