= 1919 Furman Baptists football team =

American college football season

1919 Furman Baptists football
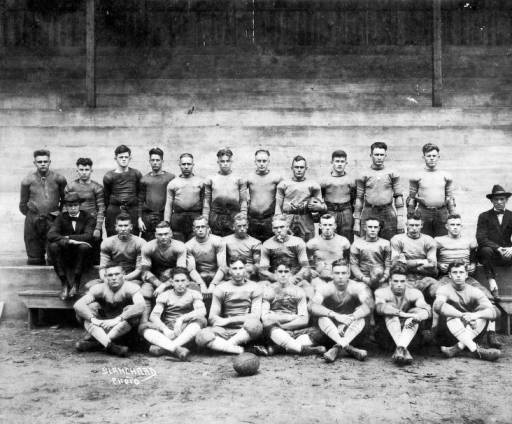

State champion
- Conference: Southern Intercollegiate Athletic Association
- Record: 6–2–1 (2–1–1 SIAA)
- Head coach: Billy Laval (5th season)
- Home stadium: Manly Field

1919 Southern Intercollegiate Athletic Association football standings
	Conf.					Overall
Team	W		L		T	W		L		T
Auburn $	5	–	1	–	0	8	–	1	–	0
Alabama	6	–	1	–	0	8	–	1	–	0
Centre	1	–	0	–	0	9	–	0	–	0
Kentucky	3	–	1	–	1	3	–	4	–	1
Georgia Tech	3	–	1	–	0	7	–	3	–	0
Tulane	3	–	1	–	1	6	–	2	–	1
Vanderbilt	3	–	1	–	2	5	–	1	–	2
Furman	2	–	1	–	1	6	–	2	–	1
Mississippi A&M	5	–	2	–	0	6	–	2	–	0
Georgia	4	–	2	–	2	4	–	2	–	3
LSU	3	–	2	–	0	6	–	2	–	0
Clemson	3	–	2	–	2	6	–	2	–	2
Florida	2	–	2	–	0	5	–	3	–	0
Wofford	1	–	1	–	0	3	–	2	–	1
Transylvania	1	–	1	–	0	2	–	4	–	0
Ole Miss	1	–	4	–	0	4	–	4	–	0
The Citadel	1	–	4	–	0	4	–	4	–	1
Sewanee	1	–	4	–	0	3	–	6	–	0
Georgetown (KY)	0	–	0	–	0	0	–	2	–	0
Tennessee	0	–	3	–	2	3	–	3	–	3
South Carolina	0	–	4	–	1	1	–	7	–	1
Mercer	0	–	1	–	0	0	–	2	–	0
Mississippi College	0	–	4	–	0	3	–	5	–	1
Howard (AL)	0	–	4	–	0	3	–	5	–	2
$ – Conference champion

The 1919 Furman Baptists football team represented Furman University during the 1919 Southern Intercollegiate Athletic Association football season. Led by fifth-year head coach Billy Laval, Furman compiled an overall record of 6–2–1 with a mark of 2–1–1 in SIAA play.

== Schedule ==
Date	Time	Opponent	Site	Result	Attendance	Source
September 27		at Georgia Tech	Grant Field; Atlanta, GA	L 0–74		
October 4	4:00 p.m.	Oglethorpe*	Manly Field; Greenville, SC	W 13–0		
October 11	4:00 p.m.	Wofford	Manly Field; Greenville, SC (rivalry)	W 7–6		
October 18	4:00 p.m.	Presbyterian*	Manly Field; Greenville, SC	W 6–0		
October 25	4:00 p.m.	Wake Forest*	Manly Field; Greenville, SC	W 39–7		
November 1	3:30 p.m.	The Citadel	Manly Field; Greenville, SC (rivalry)	W 21–6		
November 15	3:00 p.m.	Erskine*	Manly Field; Greenville, SC	W 41–0		
November 21	3:00 p.m.	Clemson	Manly Field; Greenville, SC	T 7–7	4,000	
November 27	3:00 p.m.	Davidson*	Manly Field; Greenville, SC	L 14–41	4,000	
*Non-conference game; All times are in Eastern time
