= 1919 Centre Praying Colonels football team =

American college football season

1919 Centre Praying Colonels football
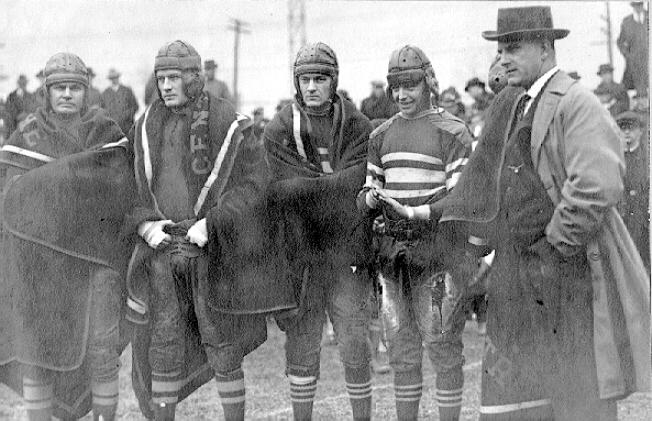
- Centre players after the defeat of West Virginia

National champion (Sagarin)
- Conference: Southern Intercollegiate Athletic Association
- Record: 9–0 (1–0 SIAA)
- Head coach: Charley Moran (3rd season)
- Offensive scheme: Single-wing
- Captain: Bo McMillin
- Home stadium: Cheek Field

Uniform
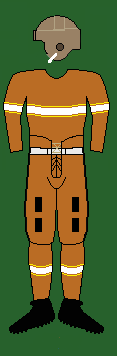

1919 Southern Intercollegiate Athletic Association football standings
	Conf.					Overall
Team	W		L		T	W		L		T
Auburn $	5	–	1	–	0	8	–	1	–	0
Alabama	6	–	1	–	0	8	–	1	–	0
Centre	1	–	0	–	0	9	–	0	–	0
Kentucky	3	–	1	–	1	3	–	4	–	1
Georgia Tech	3	–	1	–	0	7	–	3	–	0
Tulane	3	–	1	–	1	6	–	2	–	1
Vanderbilt	3	–	1	–	2	5	–	1	–	2
Furman	2	–	1	–	1	6	–	2	–	1
Mississippi A&M	5	–	2	–	0	6	–	2	–	0
Georgia	4	–	2	–	2	4	–	2	–	3
LSU	3	–	2	–	0	6	–	2	–	0
Clemson	3	–	2	–	2	6	–	2	–	2
Florida	2	–	2	–	0	5	–	3	–	0
Wofford	1	–	1	–	0	3	–	2	–	1
Transylvania	1	–	1	–	0	2	–	4	–	0
Ole Miss	1	–	4	–	0	4	–	4	–	0
The Citadel	1	–	4	–	0	4	–	4	–	1
Sewanee	1	–	4	–	0	3	–	6	–	0
Georgetown (KY)	0	–	0	–	0	0	–	2	–	0
Tennessee	0	–	3	–	2	3	–	3	–	3
South Carolina	0	–	4	–	1	1	–	7	–	1
Mercer	0	–	1	–	0	0	–	2	–	0
Mississippi College	0	–	4	–	0	3	–	5	–	1
Howard (AL)	0	–	4	–	0	3	–	5	–	2
$ – Conference champion

The 1919 Centre Praying Colonels football team represented Centre College in the 1919 Southern Intercollegiate Athletic Association football season. The Praying Colonels scored 485 points, leading the nation, while allowing 23 points and finishing their season with a perfect record of 9–0. The team was retroactively selected by Jeff Sagarin as national champion for the 1919 season.

Quarterback Bo McMillin and center James "Red" Weaver were named to Walter Camp's first-team 1919 College Football All-America Team. Just the year before, Georgia's Bum Day had been the first player from the South ever selected to Camp's first team– and Centre thus became the first Southern school with two. Fullback and end James "Red" Roberts was named to Camp's third team.

The highlight of the season was the win over West Virginia. McMillin had the team pray before it, forever giving the Centre College Colonels its alternate moniker of "Praying Colonels."

== Schedule ==
Date	Opponent	Site	Result
September 27	Hanover*	Cheek Field; Danville, KY	W 95–0
October 4	at Indiana*	Jordan Field; Bloomington, IN	W 12–3
October 18	St. Xavier*	Cheek Field; Danville, KY	W 57–0
October 25	at Transylvania	Lexington, KY	W 69–0
November 1	at Virginia*	Lambeth Field; Charlottesville, VA	W 49–7
November 8	at West Virginia*	Charleston, WV	W 14–6
November 15	Kentucky	Cheek Field; Danville, KY (rivalry)	W 56–0
November 22	vs. DePauw*	Louisville, KY	W 56–0
November 27	at Georgetown (KY)	Georgetown, KY	W 77–7
*Non-conference game

A game with Maryville was scheduled for October 11 but never played due to Maryville injuries.

== Before the season ==
Five Centre regulars were natives of Fort Worth, Texas, namely captain and quarterback Bo McMillin, and linemen Bill James, Sully Montgomery, Matty Bell, and Red Weaver. They were accused of being professionals, but the charges were rebuked by season's end. According to one author, "Without Bo it would not be a Centre team." Centre's linemen were known as the "Seven Mustangs".

Former Centre player and North Side High School head coach Robert L. Myers was to bring McMillin, Weaver, and the above teammates to Centre. However, McMillin and Weaver did not have sufficient credits to enter college, and thus entered Somerset High School for the 1916-17 year, playing with Red Roberts.

== Game summaries ==
=== Week 1: Hanover ===
Hanover at Centre

Team	1	2	3	4	Total
Hanover	0	0	0	0	0
• Centre	26	20	21	28	95

- Date: September 27
- Location: Cheek Field
  Danville, KY
- Referee: Dexheimer (Chattanooga)

On opening day, Centre swamped Hanover, 95–0. Eight different players scored. Roberts was shifted from fullback to tackle, and played well.

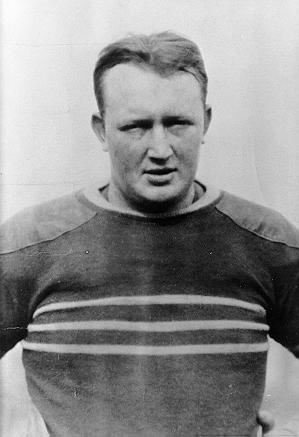
Red Roberts

The starting lineup was King (left end), Roberts (left tackle), Montgomery (left guard), Bell (center), Van Antwerp (right guard), Coleman (right tackle), Whitnell (right end), McMillin (quarterback), Murphy (left halfback), Davis (right halfback), Diddle (fullback).

=== Week 2: at Indiana ===
Centre at Indiana

Team	1	2	3	4	Total
• Centre	0	0	0	12	12
Indiana	3	0	0	0	3

- Date: October 4
- Location: Jordan Field
  Bloomington, IN
- Referee: Gardner (Cornell)

Centre beat Indiana, 12–3. Indiana was up 3–0 with 2:20 left in the game, when Centre started its comeback victory. McMillin and Roberts worked it towards the goal, Roberts going over. Indiana was then desperate to even the score, and McMillin intercepted a pass, and returned it for a touchdown, dodging and straight arming the entire Indiana eleven. Indiana's three points came early in the first period, when its quarterback, Mathys, made a 35-yard drop kick.

The starting lineup was Whitnell (left end), Montgomery (left tackle), Van Antwerp (left guard), Garrett (center), Coleman (right guard), James (right tackle), McCullom (right end), McMillin (quarterback), Bittle (left halfback), Davis (right halfback), Roberts (fullback).

=== Week 3: St. Xavier ===
St. Xavier at Centre

Team	1	2	3	4	Total
St. Xavier	0	0	0	0	0
• Centre	13	12	13	19	57

- Date: October 18
- Location: Cheek Field
  Danville, KY

The Colonels beat St. Xavier, 57–0. The field was in poor condition due to heavy rains from the past week. Xavier never crossed Centre's 30-yard line. McMillin twice connected with Armstrong for 80-yard forward passes. McMillin also had four runs of greater than 50 yards. Roberts's punts averaged 60 yards in the second half.

The starting lineup was Bell (left end), Montgomery (left tackle), Van Antwerp (left guard), Weaver (center), Ford (right guard), James (right tackle), King (right end), McMillin (quarterback), Armstrong (left halfback), Davis (right halfback), Roberts (fullback).

=== Week 4: at Transylvania ===
Centre at Transylvania

Team	1	2	3	4	Total
• Centre	20	13	13	23	69
Transylvania	0	0	0	0	0

- Date: October 25
- Location: Lexington, KY
- Referee: Marty (Cincinnati)

In the fourth week of play, the Colonels beat Transylvania, 69–0. Transylvania's Milton broken several bones in his foot the week previous. Davis and McMillin each scored three touchdowns.

The starting lineup was King (left end), Montgomery (left tackle), Van Antwerp (left guard), Weaver (center), Cregor (right guard), James (right tackle), Bell (right end), McMillin (quarterback), Armstrong (left halfback), Davis (right halfback), Roberts (fullback).

=== Week 5: at Virginia ===
Centre at Virginia

Team	1	2	3	4	Total
• Centre	14	14	14	7	49
Virginia	0	7	0	0	7

- Date: November 1
- Location: Lambeth Field
  Charlottesville, VA
- Referee: Smith (Washington & Lee)

Centre's backfield starred and smashed the Virginia Orange and Blue, 49–7 in the mud. Joe Murphy had a 75-yard touchdown run. Soon after, McMillin went 70 yards for a touchdown. Kuyk scored Virginia's points.

The starting lineup was Bell (left end), Montgomery (left tackle), Van Antwerp (left guard), Weaver (center), Cregor (right guard), James (right tackle), Snoddy (right end), McMillin (quarterback), Armstrong (left halfback), Davis (right halfback), Roberts (fullback).

=== Week 6: at West Virginia ===
Centre at West Virginia

Team	1	2	3	4	Total
• Centre	0	0	7	7	14
West Virginia	6	0	0	0	6

- Date: November 8
- Location: Charleston, WV
- Referee: Mike Thompson

The sixth week of play brought the highlight of the season — a 14–6 comeback win over West Virginia, a team which beaten Eastern power Princeton the week before, and had the nation's leading scorer Ira Rodgers. McMillin had the team pray before the game, forever giving the Centre College Colonels its alternate moniker of "Praying Colonels."

Rodgers came out passing and West Virginia scores first early when he bucked it over. Later, a 25-yard pass from McMillin to Terry Snoddy brought the ball near the goal. Roberts eventually scored. Centre had another touchdown drive in the last quarter, ending in McMillin sidestepping for a touchdown. Murphy was in a flimsy track suit and track shoes.

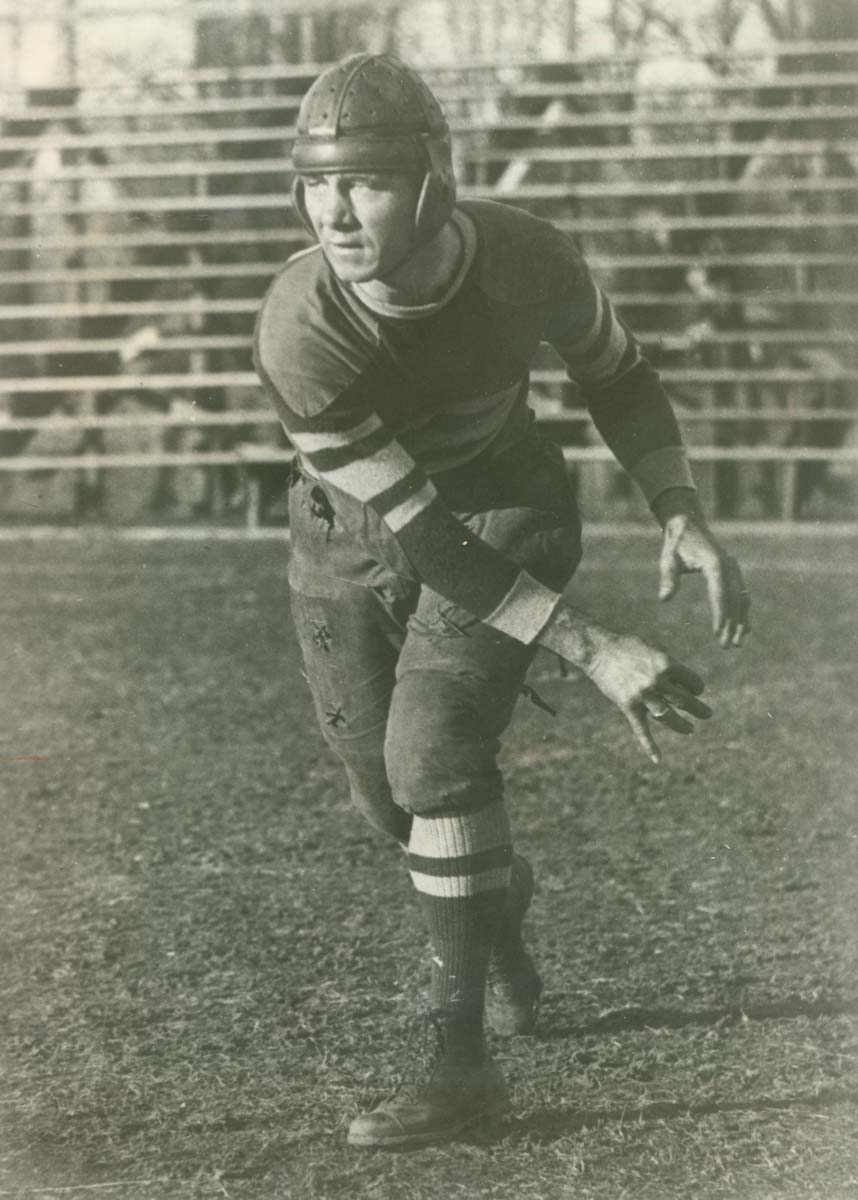
Bo McMillin

The starting lineup was Bell (left end), Montgomery (left tackle), Van Antwerp (left guard), Weaver (center), Cregor (right guard), Jones (right tackle), Snoddy (right end), McMillin (quarterback), Davis (left halfback), Armstrong (right halfback), Roberts (fullback).

=== Week 7: Kentucky ===
Kentucky at Centre

Team	1	2	3	4	Total
Kentucky	0	0	0	0	0
• Centre	14	7	7	28	56

- Date: November 15
- Location: Cheek Field
  Danville, KY
- Referee: Marty (Kenyon)

With a large crowd at home on Cheek Field, the Colonels beat rival Kentucky, 56–0, giving the Wildcats their worst loss on the season. Roberts had three touchdowns.

The starting lineup was Bell (left end), Montgomery (left tackle), Van Antwerp (left guard), Weaver (center), Cregor (right guard), James (right tackle), Snoddy (right end), McMillin (quarterback), Davis (left halfback), Armstrong (right halfback), Roberts (fullback).

=== Week 8: vs. DePauw ===
DePauw vs. Centre

Team	1	2	3	4	Total
DePauw	0	0	0	0	0
• Centre	7	14	21	14	56

- Date: November 22
- Location: Louisville, KY
- Referee: Marty (Kenyon)

The Colonels defeated the DePauw in Louisville 56–0. McMillin's passes "aroused the wonderment of the crowd." The first touchdown came on an 18-yard pass to Army Armstrong.

The starting lineup was Bell (left end), Montgomery (left tackle), Van Antwerp (left guard), Weaver (center), Cregor (right guard), James (right tackle), Snoddy (right end), McMillin (quarterback), Armstrong (left halfback), Davis (right halfback), Roberts (fullback).

=== Week 9: at Georgetown ===
Centre at Georgetown

Team	1	2	3	4	Total
• Centre	14	21	28	14	77
Georgetown	0	0	7	0	7

- Date: November 27
- Location: Georgetown, KY
- Referee: Marty (Kenyon)

Centre rolled up a 77–7 score on the Georgetown Tigers. Georgetown's one score came off a 65-yard fumble return. Weaver made 11 straight extra points.

The starting lineup was Bell (left end), Montgomery (left tackle), Van Antwerp (left guard), Weaver (center), Cregor (right guard), James (right tackle), Snoddy (right end), McMillin (quarterback), Davis (left halfback), Armstrong (right halfback), Roberts (fullback).

== After the season ==
=== Legacy ===
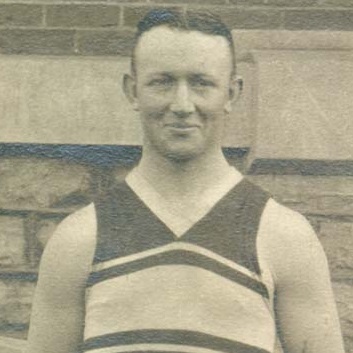
Red Weaver

Red Weaver reportedly scored 46 extra point field goals in a row, though it was in fact 43, and held the NCAA record with a reported 99 consecutive points after touchdowns in the 1919 and 1920 seasons. Weaver was put at the placekicker position on an Associated Press Southeast Area All-Time football team 1869-1919 era.

The season brought national attention to the small town of Danville.

=== Awards and honors ===
Due to the dispute over professionalism, most writers picked Auburn as SIAA champion. The team was retroactively selected by Jeff Sagarin as the national champion for the 1919 season.

McMillin and Weaver were named to Walter Camp's first-team 1919 College Football All-America Team. Just the year before Bum Day was the first Southern player ever selected to Camp's first team – and Centre became the first school with two. Fullback and end Red Roberts was named to Camp's third team.

== Players ==
=== Depth chart ===
The following chart provides a visual depiction of Centre's lineup during the 1919 season with games started at the position reflected in parentheses. The chart mimics a single wing on offense.

LE Matty Bell (6) Gus King (2) Edwin Whitnell (1)	LG H. Van Antwerp (8) S. Montgomery (1)	C Red Weaver (7) Matty Bell (1) William Garrett (1)	RG Ben Cregor (6) Coleman (1) Clayton Ford (1) H. Van Antwerp (1)	LT S. Montgomery (8) Red Roberts (1)	RT Bill James (8) Coleman (1)	RE Terry Snoddy (5) Matty Bell (1) Gus King (1) McCullom (1) Edwin Whitnell (1)
				QB Bo McMillin (9)			RHB Allen Davis (6) N. Armstrong (3)
			FB Red Roberts (8) Edgar Diddle (1)
	LHB N. Armstrong (4) Allen Davis (3) Edgar Diddle (1) Joe Murphy (1)

=== Starters ===
==== Line ====
Jersey number	Player	Position	Games started	Hometown	Prep school	Height	Weight	Age
1	Matty Bell	End	7	Fort Worth, TX	North Side H. S.		163	20
4	Ben Cregor	Guard	6	Springfield, KY	Springfield H. S.	5'11"	175	20
5	Bill James	Tackle	8	Fort Worth, TX	North Side H. S.		169	21
2	Sully Montgomery	Tackle	9	Fort Worth, TX	North Side H. S.	6'3"	210	18
6	Terry Snoddy	End	5	Owensboro, KY	Owensboro H. S.	5'10"	173	19
3	Howard Van Antwerp	Guard	8	Mt. Sterling, KY	Mt. Sterling H. S.		173	20
11	Red Weaver	Center	7	Fort Worth, TX	North Side H. S.	5'10"	158	21

==== Backfield ====
Jersey number	Player	Position	Games started	Hometown	Prep school	Height	Weight	Age
9	Norris Armstrong	Halfback	7	Fort Smith, AR	Fort Smith H. S.	5'10"	154	21
8	Allen Davis	Halfback	9	Danville, KY	Danville H. S.		148	20
7	Bo McMillin	Quarterback	9	Fort Worth, TX	North Side H. S.	5'9"	175	21
12	Red Roberts	Fullback	9	Somerset, KY	Somerset H. S.	6'2"	193	19

=== Subs ===
==== Line ====
Jersey number	Player	Position	Games started	Hometown	Prep school	Height	Weight	Age
	Coleman	Tackle	2					
17	Clayton Ford	Guard	1	Danville, KY			190	20
18	William Garrett	Center	1	Columbus, OH	West H. S.		155	21
16	Gus King	End	3	Oak Cliff, TX			155	20
13	McCullom	End	1				155	
	Edwin "Lefty" Whitnell	End	2	Fulton, KY	Fulton H. S.		160	19

==== Backfield ====
Jersey number	Player	Position	Games started	Hometown	Prep school	Height	Weight	Age
15	Edgar Diddle	Halfback	1	Gradyville, KY	Castle Heights		166	21
10	Joe "Chick" Murphy	Halfback	1	Columbus, OH	East H. S.		130	20

=== Scoring leaders ===
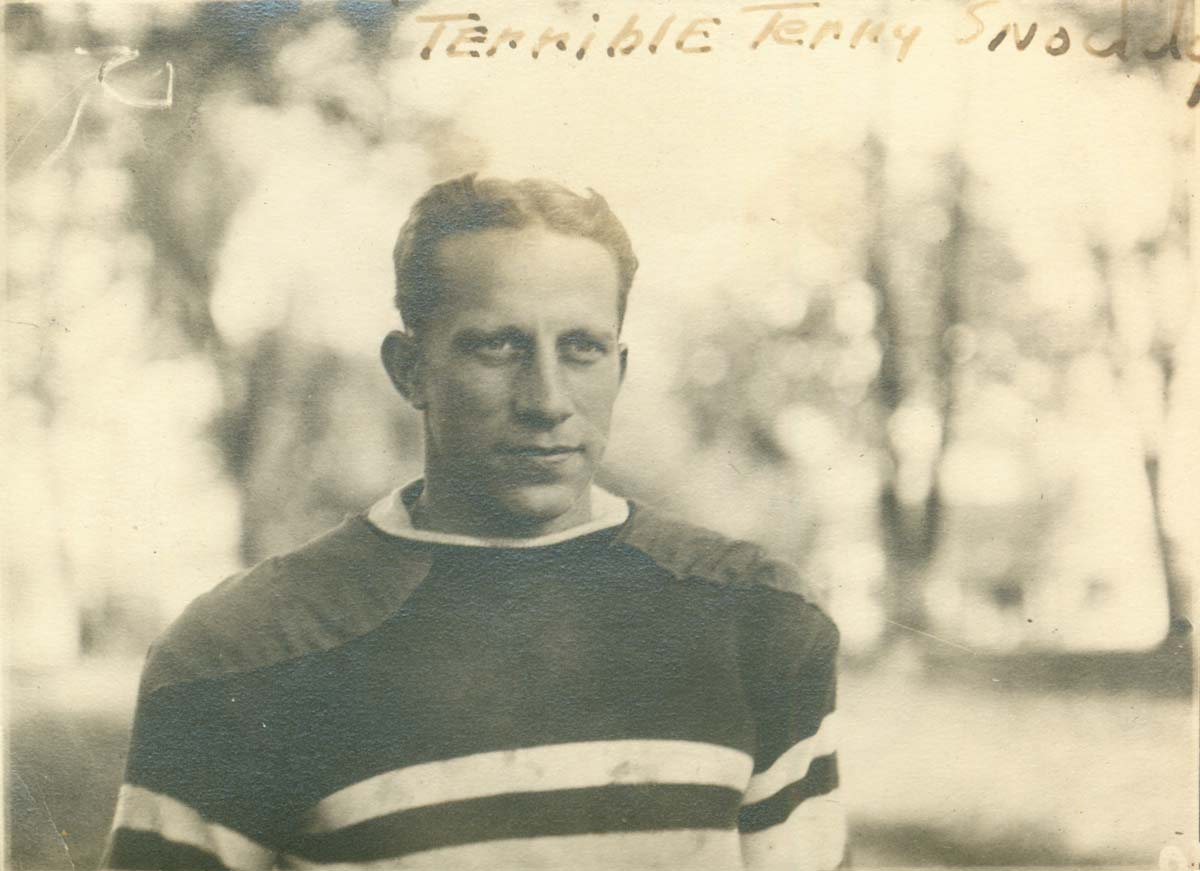
Terry Snoddy

The following is a list of statistics and scores, largely dependent on newspaper summaries.

Player	Touchdowns	Extra points	Field Goals	Safeties	Points
Bo McMillin	16	7			103
Red Roberts	15	4			94
Terry Snoddy	9				54
Allen Davis	8	2			50
Red Weaver	1	43			49
Norris Armstrong	7				42
Joe Murphy	7				42
Edwin Whitnel	3				18
Matty Bell	2				12
Hump Tanner	2				12
Edgar Diddle	1				6
Safety v. Transy				1	2
Howard Van Antwerp		1			1
Total	71	57		1	485

== See also ==
- 1919 College Football All-Southern Team
