= 1919 Georgia Bulldogs football team =

American college football season

1919 Georgia Bulldogs football
- Conference: Southern Intercollegiate Athletic Association
- Record: 4–2–3 (4–2–2 SIAA)
- Head coach: W. A. Cunningham (8th season)
- Captain: Artie Pew
- Home stadium: Sanford Field

Uniform
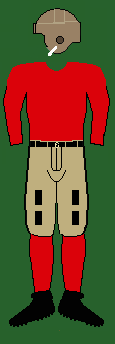

1919 Southern Intercollegiate Athletic Association football standings
	Conf.					Overall
Team	W		L		T	W		L		T
Auburn $	5	–	1	–	0	8	–	1	–	0
Alabama	6	–	1	–	0	8	–	1	–	0
Centre	1	–	0	–	0	9	–	0	–	0
Kentucky	3	–	1	–	1	3	–	4	–	1
Georgia Tech	3	–	1	–	0	7	–	3	–	0
Tulane	3	–	1	–	1	6	–	2	–	1
Vanderbilt	3	–	1	–	2	5	–	1	–	2
Furman	2	–	1	–	1	6	–	2	–	1
Mississippi A&M	5	–	2	–	0	6	–	2	–	0
Georgia	4	–	2	–	2	4	–	2	–	3
LSU	3	–	2	–	0	6	–	2	–	0
Clemson	3	–	2	–	2	6	–	2	–	2
Florida	2	–	2	–	0	5	–	3	–	0
Wofford	1	–	1	–	0	3	–	2	–	1
Transylvania	1	–	1	–	0	2	–	4	–	0
Ole Miss	1	–	4	–	0	4	–	4	–	0
The Citadel	1	–	4	–	0	4	–	4	–	1
Sewanee	1	–	4	–	0	3	–	6	–	0
Georgetown (KY)	0	–	0	–	0	0	–	2	–	0
Tennessee	0	–	3	–	2	3	–	3	–	3
South Carolina	0	–	4	–	1	1	–	7	–	1
Mercer	0	–	1	–	0	0	–	2	–	0
Mississippi College	0	–	4	–	0	3	–	5	–	1
Howard (AL)	0	–	4	–	0	3	–	5	–	2
$ – Conference champion

The 1919 Georgia Bulldogs football team represented the University of Georgia during the 1919 college football season. Georgia completed the season with a 4–2–3 record. The Bulldogs won their first four games, but struggled in the last five. The two losses came against Alabama and Auburn. This was W. A. Cunningham's last season as the head coach for Georgia. The record for the decade was the same as the coach's record: 43–18–9.

== Schedule ==
Date	Opponent	Site	Result	Attendance	Source
October 4	The Citadel	Sanford Field; Athens, GA	W 28–0		
October 11	South Carolina	Sanford Field; Athens, GA (rivalry)	W 14–0		
October 18	Sewanee	Sanford Field; Athens, GA	W 13–0		
October 25	vs. Florida	Plant Field; Tampa, FL (rivalry)	W 16–0	3,000	
November 1	vs. Auburn	Memorial Stadium; Columbus, GA (rivalry)	L 0–7	8,000	
November 7	Virginia*	Sanford Field; Athens, GA	T 7–7		
November 15	vs. Tulane	Augusta, GA	T 7–7		
November 22	vs. Alabama	Ponce de Leon Park; Atlanta, GA (rivalry)	L 0–6	10,000	
November 27	Clemson	Sanford Field; Athens, GA (rivalry)	T 0–0		
*Non-conference game

== Before the season ==
Georgia had its first season since the First World War interrupted play.

== Game summaries ==
=== Sewanee ===
Sewanee was defeated 13–0. The starting lineup was Reynolds (left end), Rigdon (left tackle), Whelchel (left guard), Day (center), Vandiver (right guard), Pew (right tackle), Hargrett (right end), Barchan (quarterback), J. Reynolds (left halfback), Rothe (right halfback), Neville (fullback).

=== Florida ===
Georgia at Florida

Team	1	2	3	4	Total
• Georgia	0	0	13	3	16
Florida	0	0	0	0	0

- Date: October 25
- Location: Plant Field
  Tampa, Florida
- Game attendance: 3,000
- Referee: Stricker Coles

Florida's Tootie Perry had a breakout game in a 16–0 win for the Bulldogs on Plant Field, dueling with Georgia center Bum Day. The Gators kept the game close for three quarters.

The starting lineup was Collings (left end), Pew (left tackle), Vandiver (left guard), Day (center), Whelchel (right guard), Rigdon (right tackle), O. Reynolds (right end), Barchan (quarterback), Rothe (left halfback), Cheves (right halfback), Munn (fullback).

=== Auburn ===
Auburn vs. Georgia

Team	1	2	3	4	Total
• Auburn	7	0	0	0	7
Georgia	0	0	0	0	0

- Date: November 1
- Location: Memorial Stadium
  Columbus, Georgia
- Game attendance: 8,000
- Game weather: Heavy rain
- Referee: John Counselman

In heavy rain and mud, SIAA champion Auburn defeated Georgia 7–0. Red Howard ran through the entire Georgia team for 52 yards and the touchdown.

The starting lineup was O. Reynolds (left end), Harper (left tackle), Vandiver (left guard), Day (center), Pew (right guard), Rigdon (right tackle), Collings (right end), Barchan (quarterback), J. Reynolds (left halfback), Rothe (right halfback), Neville (fullback).

=== Tulane ===
Georgia and Tulane fought to a 7–7 tie. The starting lineup was Reynolds (left end), Harper (left tackle), Whelchel (left guard), Day (center), Rigdon (right guard), Pew (right tackle), Collings (right end), Barchan (quarterback), McWhorter (left halfback(, Broyles (right halfback), Munn (fullback).

=== Alabama ===
Team	1	2	3	4	Total
• Alabama	3	3	0	0	6
Georgia	0	0	0	0	0

- Date: November 22
- Location: Ponce de Leon Park
  Atlanta, Georgia
- Game attendance: 10,000

Alabama beat the Bulldogs 6–0. The only points in the game came on a pair of J. T. O'Connor field goals. The first was from 45-yards in the first and the second from 25-yards in the second quarter. Both teams played strong defense throughout the game, and Georgia nearly pulled out a win when Buck Cheves intercepted an Alabama pass in the final seconds of the game and made a sizable return before he was tackled by the Crimson Tide.

The starting lineup was Reynolds (left end), Harper (left tackle), Rigdon (left guard), Day (center), Whelchel (right guard), Pew (right tackle), Collings (right end), Cheeves (quarterback), McWhorter (left halfback(, Broyles (right halfback), Tanner (fullback).

=== Clemson ===
The Bulldogs and the Clemson Tigers battled to a scoreless tie.

== Bibliography ==
- Woodruff, Fuzzy (1928). A History of Southern Football 1890–1928. Vol. 1.
