= 1919 Alabama Crimson Tide football team =

American college football season

1919 Alabama Crimson Tide football
- Conference: Southern Intercollegiate Athletic Association
- Record: 8–1 (6–1 SIAA)
- Head coach: Xen C. Scott (1st season)
- Captain: Ike Rogers
- Home stadium: University Field; Rickwood Field

1919 Southern Intercollegiate Athletic Association football standings
	Conf.					Overall
Team	W		L		T	W		L		T
Auburn $	5	–	1	–	0	8	–	1	–	0
Alabama	6	–	1	–	0	8	–	1	–	0
Centre	1	–	0	–	0	9	–	0	–	0
Kentucky	3	–	1	–	1	3	–	4	–	1
Georgia Tech	3	–	1	–	0	7	–	3	–	0
Tulane	3	–	1	–	1	6	–	2	–	1
Vanderbilt	3	–	1	–	2	5	–	1	–	2
Furman	2	–	1	–	1	6	–	2	–	1
Mississippi A&M	5	–	2	–	0	6	–	2	–	0
Georgia	4	–	2	–	2	4	–	2	–	3
LSU	3	–	2	–	0	6	–	2	–	0
Clemson	3	–	2	–	2	6	–	2	–	2
Florida	2	–	2	–	0	5	–	3	–	0
Wofford	1	–	1	–	0	3	–	2	–	1
Transylvania	1	–	1	–	0	2	–	4	–	0
Ole Miss	1	–	4	–	0	4	–	4	–	0
The Citadel	1	–	4	–	0	4	–	4	–	1
Sewanee	1	–	4	–	0	3	–	6	–	0
Georgetown (KY)	0	–	0	–	0	0	–	2	–	0
Tennessee	0	–	3	–	2	3	–	3	–	3
South Carolina	0	–	4	–	1	1	–	7	–	1
Mercer	0	–	1	–	0	0	–	2	–	0
Mississippi College	0	–	4	–	0	3	–	5	–	1
Howard (AL)	0	–	4	–	0	3	–	5	–	2
$ – Conference champion

The 1919 Alabama Crimson Tide football team (variously "Alabama", "UA" or "Bama") represented the University of Alabama in the 1919 college football season. It was the Crimson Tide's 26th overall and 23rd season as a member of the Southern Intercollegiate Athletic Association (SIAA). The team was led by head coach Xen C. Scott, in his first year, and played their home games at University Field in Tuscaloosa and at Rickwood Field in Birmingham, Alabama. They finished the season with a record of eight wins and one loss (8–1 overall, 6–1 in the SIAA).

After not fielding a team for the 1918 season due to the effects of World War I, in May 1919, Xen C. Scott was hired to serve as head coach of the Crimson Tide. Alabama then opened the season with four consecutive shutout victories at University Field in Tuscaloosa. After Scott defeated Birmingham–Southern in his debut as Crimson Tide head coach, the next week he defeated Ole Miss for his first SIAA victory. After a pair of blowout victories over both Howard and the Marion, Alabama defeated Sewanee, 40–0, in what was the most anticipated game of the season at Rickwood Field.

After the Sewanee win, Alabama traveled to Nashville where they lost their only game of the season against Vanderbilt 16–12. After the loss, the Crimson Tide rebounded with wins at LSU and Georgia and at Birmingham over Mississippi A&M on Thanksgiving to close the season.

== Schedule ==
Date	Opponent	Site	Result	Attendance	Source
October 4	Birmingham–Southern*	University Field; Tuscaloosa, AL	W 27–0	2,000	
October 11	Ole Miss	University Field; Tuscaloosa, AL (rivalry)	W 49–0		
October 18	Howard (AL)	University Field; Tuscaloosa, AL	W 48–0		
October 24	Marion*	University Field; Tuscaloosa, AL	W 61–0		
November 1	Sewanee	Rickwood Field; Birmingham, AL	W 40–0		
November 8	at Vanderbilt	Dudley Field; Nashville, TN	L 12–16		
November 15	at LSU	State Field; Baton Rouge, LA (rivalry)	W 23–0		
November 22	vs. Georgia	Ponce de Leon Park; Atlanta, GA (rivalry)	W 6–0	10,000	
November 27	Mississippi A&M	Rickwood Field; Birmingham, AL (rivalry)	W 14–6	6,000	
*Non-conference game

== Before the season ==
After the departure of Thomas Kelley as head coach of the Crimson Tide following their 1917 season, then athletic director B. L. Noojin was chosen as his successor. However Noojin never led the team as head coach since the 1918 season was canceled due to the effects of World War I; multiple opponents had cancelled their contests against Alabama and there was a military policy that only allowed for the team to practice for less than one hour per week. When football was reinstated for the next season, Xen C. Scott was hired to serve as head coach in May 1919. Scott had previously served as head coach of the Cleveland Naval Reserve team that upset the national champion Pittsburgh Panthers to close their 1918 season. Scott had also previously served as head coach for both Western Reserve University (1910) and the Case Institute of Technology (1911–1913) in Cleveland.

Scott opened his first fall practice on September 1, 1919. At that time, ten players from previous Alabama squads returned and included T. L. Brown, Jack Hovater, Walter E. Hovater, Ralph Lee Jones, Mullie Lenoir, Emmet Noland, J. T. O'Connor, Ike Rogers, Tram Sessions and Riggs Stephenson. After two weeks of practice, Scott divided the players into four teams in order to determine starting line-ups. At his time Scott also did not utilize a quarterback, but instead would simply snap the ball directly to the runner. Before game preparation began for their game against Birmingham–Southern, Ike Rogers was selected as team captain for the season by the returning lettermen on September 25. Rogers was previously elected to serve as team captain for the 1918 season that was canceled.

=== 1918 schedule (cancelled) ===
In December 1917, Alabama released its tentative schedule for the 1918 season. At that time, the Crimson Tide were scheduled to open the season against Kentucky in Tuscaloosa and play Vanderbilt at Dudley Field. In the February that followed, the official schedule was released that featured four games in Tuscaloosa, two in Birmingham and one on the road.

Date	Opponent	Site	Result
October 5	Birmingham College*	University Field; Tuscaloosa, AL	
October 11	Marion*	University Field; Tuscaloosa, AL	
October 26	Howard (AL)	University Field; Tuscaloosa, AL	
November 2	Sewanee	Rickwood Field; Birmingham, AL	
November 9	Vanderbilt	Rickwood Field; Birmingham, AL	
November 16	at LSU	State Field; Baton Rouge, LA (rivalry)	
November 28	Mississippi A&M	University Field; Tuscaloosa, AL (rivalry)	
*Non-conference game

== Game summaries ==
=== Birmingham–Southern ===
Team	1	2	3	4	Total
BSC	0	0	0	0	0
• Alabama	6	7	7	7	27

- Date: October 4
- Location: University Field
  Tuscaloosa, Alabama
- Game attendance: 2,000

Nearly after two years since their previous home game during the 1917 season, Alabama opened the 1919 season against Birmingham–Southern and shutout the Panthers 27–0 in the first all-time game between the schools. The opening kickoff was at 1:30 and was played in a newly expanded University Field with seating for 800 spectators. Mullie Lenoir starred in the game for Alabama as he scored a touchdown in each of the first three quarters that gave the Crimson White a 20–0 lead. Charles Bartlett scored the final points of the game with his fourth quarter touchdown that made the final score 27–0.

=== Ole Miss ===
Team	1	2	3	4	Total
Ole Miss	0	0	0	0	0
• Alabama	6	12	25	6	49

- Date: October 11
- Location: University Field
  Tuscaloosa, Alabama

In their second game, Alabama shutout their SIAA rival, the Ole Miss Rebels 49–0 at Tuscaloosa. After being held scoreless for the first ten minutes, Alabama scored their first touchdown on Mullie Lenoir run late in the quarter. A pair of second quarter touchdown runs from first Riggs Stephenson and then by Charles Bartlett that made the halftime score 18–0. In the third quarter, the Crimson Tide scored 25 points and included a pair of long touchdown scores. The long scores came first on a 76-yard Lenoir run and the second on a 65-yard interception return by Stephenson. Lenoir and Stephenson each scored another touchdown as did J. T. O'Connor and make the final score 49–0.

=== Howard (AL) ===
Team	1	2	3	4	Total
Howard	0	0	0	0	0
• Alabama	21	6	7	14	48

- Date: October 18
- Location: University Field
  Tuscaloosa, Alabama

Behind a strong passing game, Alabama defeated the Howard (now known as Samford University) Bulldogs 48–0 at Tuscaloosa. Touchdowns in the game were scored twice each by Mullie Lenoir] and Riggs Stephenson and one apiece by Isaac M. Boone, Tram Sessions and Joe Sewell. In the game, the Crimson offense was dominant both running and passing the ball in the victory.

=== Marionilitary ===
Team	1	2	3	4	Total
Marion	0	0	0	0	0
• Alabama	7	20	2	32	61

- Date: October 24
- Location: University Field
  Tuscaloosa, Alabama

As they entered their game against the Marion Military Institute, many of the Alabama supporters viewed the game against the Cadets as just a practice game before their anticipated match-up against Sewanee. On a Friday afternoon, Alabama defeated the Cadets 61–0 at Tuscaloosa for their fourth consecutive shutout to open the season. Touchdowns in the game were scored three times by J. H. Emmett, twice each by Charles Bartlett and Mullie Lenoir, and one apiece by Walter E. Hovater and Morgan.

=== Sewanee ===
Team	1	2	3	4	Total
Sewanee	0	0	0	0	0
• Alabama	7	7	12	14	40

- Date: November 1
- Location: Rickwood Field
  Birmingham, Alabama

In what was the most anticipated game of the season, the entire University population and educators traveled to Birmingham for their game against Sewanee. In the game Alabama defeated the Tigers 40–0 at Rickwood Field, in the largest margin of victory ever for Alabama over Sewanee to date. Alabama took an early 7–0 lead in the first quarter on a 15-yard Riggs Stephenson touchdown run and then extended it to 14–0 at halftime on a 45-yard Walter E. Hovater touchdown run in the second. Alabama then closed the game with four Mullie Lenoir touchdown runs, two in the third and two in the fourth quarter.

=== Vanderbilt ===
Team	1	2	3	4	Total
Alabama	0	0	6	6	12
• Vanderbilt	0	13	0	3	16

- Date: November 8
- Location: Dudley Field
  Nashville, Tennessee

A week after their victory over Sewanee, Alabama traveled to Nashville where they were defeated by the Vanderbilt Commodores 16–12 on a muddy field for their only loss of the season. On their first drive of the game, Alabama took the ball to the Vanderbilt two-yard line, but then fumbled the ball that was recovered by Josh Cody of the Commodores to end the scoring threat. The second Alabama fumble resulted in the first touchdown of the game. Early in the second quarter, Riggs Stephenson fumbled the ball that was recovered by Tommy Zerfoss and returned 35-yards for a 7–0 Vanderbilt lead. They further extended their lead to 13–0 at halftime on a 20-yard Grailey Berryhill touchdown run.

Alabama rallied in the second half with a pair of two-yards Stephenson touchdown runs in the third and fourth quarter that made the score 13–12. Cody then provided for the final margin in the 16–12 Commodores' victory with his 30-yard field goal in the fourth quarter.

The starting lineup was J. Hovater (left end), Brown (left tackle), Johnson (left guard), Sessions (center), Jones (right guard), Rogers (right tackle), Boone (right end), W. Hovater (quarterback), Lenoir (left halfback), O'Connor (right halfback), Stephenson (fullback).

=== LSU ===
Team	1	2	3	4	Total
• Alabama	0	0	3	20	23
LSU	0	0	0	0	0

- Date: November 15
- Location: State Field
  Baton Rouge, Louisiana

After they suffered their only loss of the season at Vanderbilt, Alabama traveled to Baton Rouge where they shutout the LSU Tigers 23–0. After a scoreless first half that saw two drives end inside the Tigers ten-yard line due to fumbles, Alabama took a 3–0 lead in the third quarter on a 20-yard Joe Sewell field goal. The Crimson Tide sealed the win with three touchdowns in the fourth quarter scored on short runs by Sewell, Mullie Lenoir and Riggs Stephenson.

=== Georgia ===
Team	1	2	3	4	Total
• Alabama	3	3	0	0	6
Georgia	0	0	0	0	0

- Date: November 22
- Location: Ponce de Leon Park
  Atlanta, Georgia
- Game attendance: 10,000

After their road win at LSU, Alabama traveled to Atlanta where they shutout the Georgia Bulldogs 6–0. The only points in the game came on a pair of J. T. O'Connor field goals. The first was from 45-yards in the first and the second from 25-yards in the second quarter. Both teams played strong defense throughout the game, and Georgia nearly pulled out a win when Buck Cheves intercepted an Alabama pass in the final seconds of the game and made a sizable return before he was tackled by the Crimson Tide.

The starting lineup was J. Hovater (left end), Brown (left tackle), Johnson (left guard), Sessions (center), Jones (right guard), Rogers (right tackle), Boone (right end), W. Hovater (quarterback), O'Connor (left halfback), Lenoir (right halfback), Stevenson (fullback).

=== Mississippi A&M ===
Team	1	2	3	4	Total
Mississippi A&M	0	0	6	0	6
• Alabama	0	0	7	7	14

- Date: November 27
- Location: Rickwood Field
  Birmingham, Alabama
- Game attendance: 6,000

In their final game of the season, Alabama defeated the Mississippi A&M (now known as Mississippi State University) Aggies 14–6 on Thanksgiving at Rickwood Field. After a scoreless first half, H. S. Little scored the Aggies' only points of the game with his 80-yard kickoff return that opened the third quarter. Alabama then took the lead later in the third on a short Riggs Stephenson touchdown run. They then made the final score 14–6 in the fourth after T. L. Brown blocked an A&M punt that was recovered by Ike Rogers in the endzone for a touchdown.

== After the season ==
Alabama won eight games in a season for the first time, and was awarded by some organizations a share of the SIAA title. (Note: The SIAA did not award football championships officially by the conference. As such, any claimed SIAA titles are unofficial.) Fuzzy Woodruff recalls "Auburn claimed it. "We defeated Tech" said Auburn. "Yes, but we defeated you" said Vanderbilt. "Yes", said Alabama, "but Tech, Tulane, and Tennessee took your measure. We defeated Georgia Tech, who tied Tulane, so we are champions...The newspapers, however, more or less generally supported the claim of Auburn..."

== Personnel ==
=== Varsity letter winners ===
==== Line ====
Player	Hometown	Position	Games started	Prep school	Height	Weight	Age
T. L. Brown	Jasper, Alabama	Tackle					
Alfred M. Boone	Samantha, Alabama	End					
Ike Boone	Samantha, Alabama	End			6'0"	190	
J. H. Emmett	Albertville, Alabama	Halfback					
E. P. Hood	Birmingham, Alabama	Tackle					
Sidney Johnston	Athens, Alabama	Guard					
Ralph Lee Jones	Jones Mills, Alabama	Guard					
Ike Rogers	Vina, Alabama	Tackle		Florence Normal School		185	
Harry Rowe	Elba, Alabama	Guard					
Tram Sessions	Birmingham, Alabama	Center					
Frank Boyd Thomason	Albertville, Alabama	End					

==== Backfield ====
Player	Hometown	Position	Games started	Prep school	Height	Weight	Age
Jack Hovater	Russellville, Alabama	Back/End				190	
Walter E. Hovater	Russellville, Alabama	Back					
Mullie Lenoir	Marlin, Texas	Halfback				144	
J. T. O'Connor	St. Louis, Missouri	Back					
Joe Sewell	Titus, Alabama	Halfback			5'6"	155	
Luke Sewell	Titus, Alabama	Quarterback			5'9"	160	
Riggs Stephenson	Akron, Alabama	Fullback			5'10"	185	

=== Coaching staff ===
Name	Position	Seasons at Alabama	Alma mater
Xen C. Scott	Head coach	1	
Alfred M. Boone	Assistant coach	1	Alabama (1919)
Adrian Van de Graaff	Assistant coach	1	Alabama (1914)
