= 1919 Clemson Tigers football team =

American college football season

1919 Clemson Tigers football
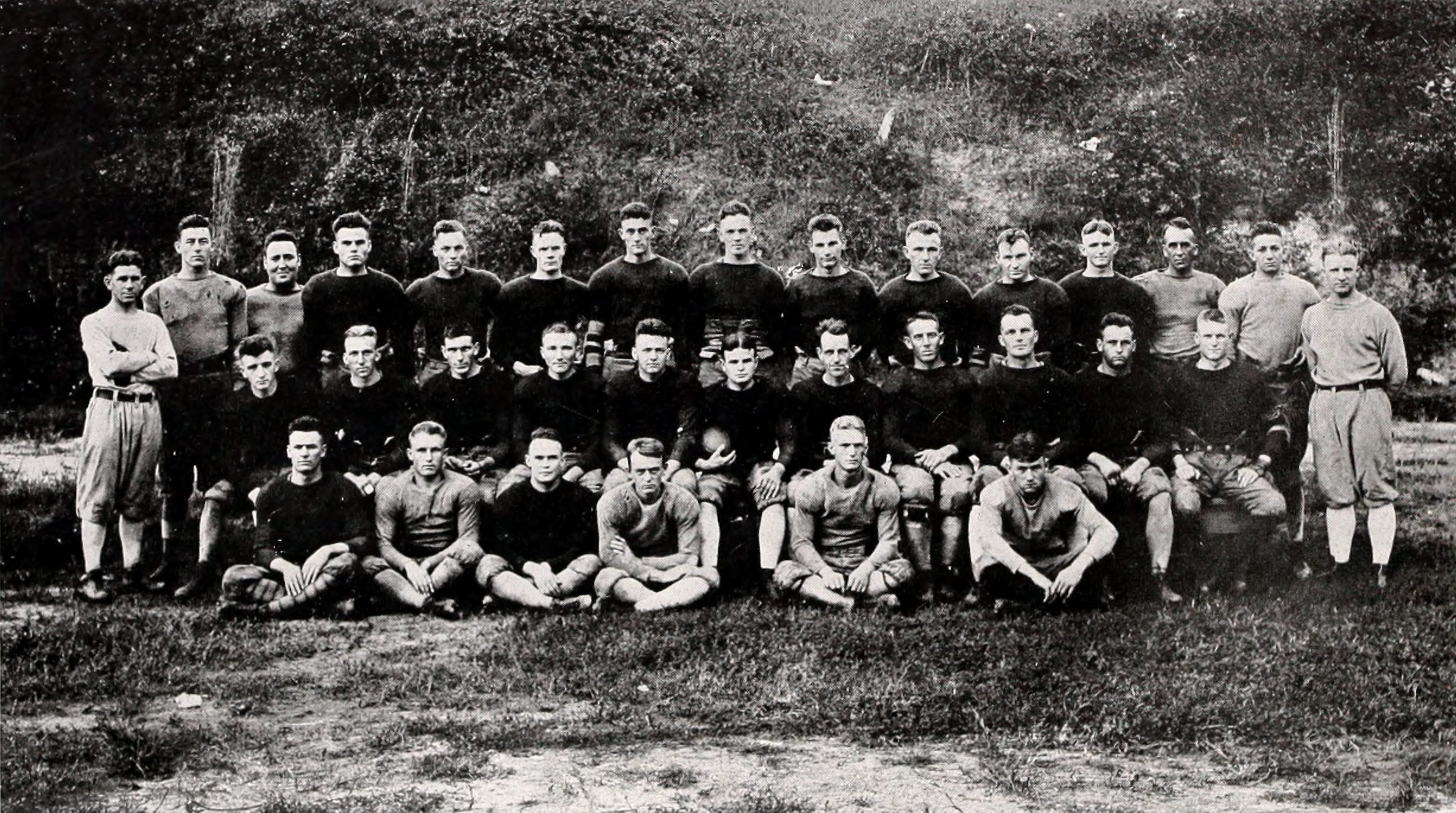
- Conference: Southern Intercollegiate Athletic Association
- Record: 6–2–2 (3–2–2 SIAA)
- Head coach: Edward Donahue (3rd season)
- Captain: Stumpy Banks
- Home stadium: Riggs Field

1919 Southern Intercollegiate Athletic Association football standings
	Conf.					Overall
Team	W		L		T	W		L		T
Auburn $	5	–	1	–	0	8	–	1	–	0
Alabama	6	–	1	–	0	8	–	1	–	0
Centre	1	–	0	–	0	9	–	0	–	0
Kentucky	3	–	1	–	1	3	–	4	–	1
Georgia Tech	3	–	1	–	0	7	–	3	–	0
Tulane	3	–	1	–	1	6	–	2	–	1
Vanderbilt	3	–	1	–	2	5	–	1	–	2
Furman	2	–	1	–	1	6	–	2	–	1
Mississippi A&M	5	–	2	–	0	6	–	2	–	0
Georgia	4	–	2	–	2	4	–	2	–	3
LSU	3	–	2	–	0	6	–	2	–	0
Clemson	3	–	2	–	2	6	–	2	–	2
Florida	2	–	2	–	0	5	–	3	–	0
Wofford	1	–	1	–	0	3	–	2	–	1
Transylvania	1	–	1	–	0	2	–	4	–	0
Ole Miss	1	–	4	–	0	4	–	4	–	0
The Citadel	1	–	4	–	0	4	–	4	–	1
Sewanee	1	–	4	–	0	3	–	6	–	0
Georgetown (KY)	0	–	0	–	0	0	–	2	–	0
Tennessee	0	–	3	–	2	3	–	3	–	3
South Carolina	0	–	4	–	1	1	–	7	–	1
Mercer	0	–	1	–	0	0	–	2	–	0
Mississippi College	0	–	4	–	0	3	–	5	–	1
Howard (AL)	0	–	4	–	0	3	–	5	–	2
$ – Conference champion

The 1919 Clemson Tigers football team represented Clemson Agricultural College—now known as Clemson University—as a member of the Southern Intercollegiate Athletic Association (SIAA) during the 1919 college football season. Under third-year head coach Edward Donahue, the team posted an overall record of 6–2–2 with a mark of 3–2–2 in SIAA play. Stumpy Banks was the team captain.

== Schedule ==
Date	Time	Opponent	Site	Result	Attendance	Source
September 27		Erskine*	Riggs Field; Calhoun, SC	W 53–0		
October 3		Davidson*	Riggs Field; Calhoun, SC	W 7–0		
October 11		at Georgia Tech	Grant Field; Atlanta, GA (rivalry)	L 0–28	5,000	
October 17		at Auburn	Drake Field; Auburn, AL (rivalry)	L 0–7		
October 25		Tennessee	Riggs Field; Calhoun, SC	W 14–0		
October 30		at South Carolina	State Fairgrounds; Columbia, SC (rivalry)	W 19–6		
November 7		Presbyterian*	Riggs Field; Calhoun, SC	W 19–7		
November 13	12:00 p.m.	vs. The Citadel	County Fairgrounds; Orangeburg, SC	W 33–0	3,000	
November 21	3:00 p.m.	at Furman	Manly Field; Greenville, SC	T 7–7	4,000	
November 27		at Georgia	Sanford Field; Athens, GA (rivalry)	T 0–0		
*Non-conference game; All times are in Eastern time

== Bibliography ==
- Bourret, Tim. "2010 Clemson Football Media Guide" (PDF). Clemson University. p. 202. Archived from the original (PDF) on November 12, 2012.
