= 1919 The Citadel Bulldogs football team =

American college football season

1919 The Citadel Bulldogs football
- Conference: Southern Intercollegiate Athletic Association
- Record: 4–4–1 (1–4 SIAA)
- Head coach: George Rogers (4th season)
- Home stadium: College Park Stadium

1919 Southern Intercollegiate Athletic Association football standings
	Conf.					Overall
Team	W		L		T	W		L		T
Auburn $	5	–	1	–	0	8	–	1	–	0
Alabama	6	–	1	–	0	8	–	1	–	0
Centre	1	–	0	–	0	9	–	0	–	0
Kentucky	3	–	1	–	1	3	–	4	–	1
Georgia Tech	3	–	1	–	0	7	–	3	–	0
Tulane	3	–	1	–	1	6	–	2	–	1
Vanderbilt	3	–	1	–	2	5	–	1	–	2
Furman	2	–	1	–	1	6	–	2	–	1
Mississippi A&M	5	–	2	–	0	6	–	2	–	0
Georgia	4	–	2	–	2	4	–	2	–	3
LSU	3	–	2	–	0	6	–	2	–	0
Clemson	3	–	2	–	2	6	–	2	–	2
Florida	2	–	2	–	0	5	–	3	–	0
Wofford	1	–	1	–	0	3	–	2	–	1
Transylvania	1	–	1	–	0	2	–	4	–	0
Ole Miss	1	–	4	–	0	4	–	4	–	0
The Citadel	1	–	4	–	0	4	–	4	–	1
Sewanee	1	–	4	–	0	3	–	6	–	0
Georgetown (KY)	0	–	0	–	0	0	–	2	–	0
Tennessee	0	–	3	–	2	3	–	3	–	3
South Carolina	0	–	4	–	1	1	–	7	–	1
Mercer	0	–	1	–	0	0	–	2	–	0
Mississippi College	0	–	4	–	0	3	–	5	–	1
Howard (AL)	0	–	4	–	0	3	–	5	–	2
$ – Conference champion

The 1919 The Citadel Bulldogs football team represented The Citadel, The Military College of South Carolina in the 1919 college football season. George Rogers returned to lead the Bulldogs for the 1919 season after a three-year absence. His second tenure as head coach lasted just one season. The Bulldogs played as members of the Southern Intercollegiate Athletic Association and played home games at College Park Stadium in Hampton Park.

== Schedule ==
Date	Time	Opponent	Site	Result	Attendance	Source
October 4		at Georgia	Sanford Field; Athens, GA	L 0–28		
October 11		Presbyterian*	College Park Stadium; Charleston, SC	W 12–7		
October 18		at Wofford	Spartanburg, SC (rivalry)	L 0–12		
October 25		USS Mercy*	College Park Stadium; Charleston, SC	W 13–12		
November 1	3:30 p.m.	at Furman	Manly Field; Greenville, SC (rivalry)	L 6–21		
November 8		at Newberry*	Newberry, SC	W 41–0		
November 13	12:00 p.m.	vs. Clemson	County Fairgrounds; Orangeburg, SC	L 0–33	3,000	
November 18		Oglethorpe*	College Park Stadium; Charleston, SC	T 0–0		
November 27		at South Carolina	College Park; Columbia, SC	W 14–7		
*Non-conference game; All times are in Eastern time
