= 1919 Florida Gators football team =

American college football season

1919 Florida Gators football
- Conference: Southern Intercollegiate Athletic Association
- Record: 5–3 (2–2 SIAA)
- Head coach: Alfred L. Buser (3rd season)
- Captain: Jim Sparkman
- Home stadium: Fleming Field

1919 Southern Intercollegiate Athletic Association football standings
	Conf.					Overall
Team	W		L		T	W		L		T
Auburn $	5	–	1	–	0	8	–	1	–	0
Alabama	6	–	1	–	0	8	–	1	–	0
Centre	1	–	0	–	0	9	–	0	–	0
Kentucky	3	–	1	–	1	3	–	4	–	1
Georgia Tech	3	–	1	–	0	7	–	3	–	0
Tulane	3	–	1	–	1	6	–	2	–	1
Vanderbilt	3	–	1	–	2	5	–	1	–	2
Furman	2	–	1	–	1	6	–	2	–	1
Mississippi A&M	5	–	2	–	0	6	–	2	–	0
Georgia	4	–	2	–	2	4	–	2	–	3
LSU	3	–	2	–	0	6	–	2	–	0
Clemson	3	–	2	–	2	6	–	2	–	2
Florida	2	–	2	–	0	5	–	3	–	0
Wofford	1	–	1	–	0	3	–	2	–	1
Transylvania	1	–	1	–	0	2	–	4	–	0
Ole Miss	1	–	4	–	0	4	–	4	–	0
The Citadel	1	–	4	–	0	4	–	4	–	1
Sewanee	1	–	4	–	0	3	–	6	–	0
Georgetown (KY)	0	–	0	–	0	0	–	2	–	0
Tennessee	0	–	3	–	2	3	–	3	–	3
South Carolina	0	–	4	–	1	1	–	7	–	1
Mercer	0	–	1	–	0	0	–	2	–	0
Mississippi College	0	–	4	–	0	3	–	5	–	1
Howard (AL)	0	–	4	–	0	3	–	5	–	2
$ – Conference champion

The 1919 Florida Gators football team represented the University of Florida in the sport of American football during the. 1919 college football season. It was Alfred L. Buser's third and last as the head coach of the Florida Gators football team.

Florida students, fans and alumni had learned to suffer through football losses to major Southern Intercollegiate Athletic Association (SIAA) opponents like the Georgia Bulldogs and Tulane Green Wave, but the 7–0 loss to the Florida Southern was viewed by many as an unacceptable failure. Nevertheless, Buser's 1919 Florida Gators completed their football season with an improved overall record of 5–3 and an SIAA conference record of 2–2.

== Before the season ==
George B. Sparkman, Jr. assisted the Gators.

The team's captain was Jim Sparkman, who returned from World War I service with the Rainbow Division after playing for Florida from 1914 to 1916. Rondo Hatton was a substitute quarterback on the team.

== Schedule ==
Date	Time	Opponent	Site	Result	Attendance
October 4		Georgia A&M*	Fleming Field; Gainesville, FL	W 33–2	1,200
October 18		Mercer	Fleming Field; Gainesville, FL	W 48–0	
October 25		vs. Georgia	Plant Field; Tampa, FL (rivalry)	L 0–16	3,000
November 1	3:30 p.m.	vs. Florida Southern*	McAdoo Field; St. Petersburg, FL	L 0–7	
November 8		at Tulane	Second Tulane Stadium; New Orleans, LA	L 2–14	
November 15		Stetson*	Fleming Field; Gainesville, FL	W 64–0	600+
November 22		at South Carolina	Melton Field; Columbia, SC	W 13–0	
November 27		Oglethorpe*	Fleming Field; Gainesville, FL	W 14–7	
*Non-conference game

== Game summaries ==
=== Georgia A&M ===
The season opened with a 33–2 defeat of Georgia A&M.

The starting lineup was Clemons (left end), Wuthrich (left tackle), Connell (left guard), Perry (center), Baker (right guard), Goldsby (right tackle), Thomas (right end), B. Anderson (quarterback), C. Anderson (left halfback), Sparkman (right halfback), Olson (fullback).

=== Mercer ===
Mercer at Florida

Team	1	2	3	4	Total
Mercer	0	0	0	0	0
• Florida	18	12	12	6	48

- Date: October 18
- Location: Gainesville, FL

In spite of rain and mud, the Gators beat the Mercer Baptists 48–0. Three hundred students led a parade in Gainesville afterwards. No extra points were kicked all game due to the wet condition of the ball. Florida scored first on a 40-yard touchdown run from C. Anderson.

The starting lineup was Clemons (left end), Wuthrich (left tackle), Connell (left guard), Perry (center), Baker (right guard), Goldsby (right tackle), Thomas (right end), B. Anderson (quarterback), C. Anderson (left halfback), Sparkman (right halfback), Merrin (fullback).

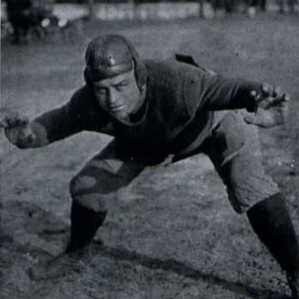
Tootie Perry

=== Georgia ===
Georgia at Florida

Team	1	2	3	4	Total
• Georgia	0	0	13	3	16
Florida	0	0	0	0	0

- Date: October 25
- Location: Plant Field
  Tampa, FL
- Game attendance: 3,000
- Referee: Stricker Coles

Tootie Perry had a breakout game in a 16–0 loss to the Georgia Bulldogs on Plant Field, dueling with Georgia center Bum Day. The Gators kept the game close for three quarters.

The starting lineup was Thomas (left end), Goldsby (left tackle), Baker (left guard), Perry (center), Connell (right guard), Wuthrich (right tackle), Clemons (right end), Hatton (quarterback), Anderson (left halfback), Sparkman (right halfback), Merrin (fullback).

=== Florida Southern ===
Florida at Florida Southern

Team	1	2	3	4	Total
Florida	0	0	0	0	0
• Southern	7	0	0	0	7

- Date: November 1
- Location: McAdoo Field, St. Petersburg, FL
- Game start: 3:30 p.m.
- Referee: Stricker Coles

In the 7–0 upset loss to Florida Southern, captain Jim Sparkman seemed the only one to draw praise.

The starting lineup was Clemons (left end), Baker (left tackle), Norton (left guard), Perry (center), Gunn (right guard), Goldsby (right tackle), Thomas (right end), B. Anderson (quarterback), C. Anderson (left halfback), Sparkman (right halfback), Stanley (fullback).

=== Tulane ===
Florida at Tulane

Team	1	2	3	4	Total
Florida	0	2	0	0	2
• Tulane	0	0	7	7	14

- Date: November 8
- Location: New Orleans, LA

Tulane beat the Gators 14–2 with its swift backfield. The Gators led 2–0 at the half. In the third periods, Tulane's Williams completed a pass for a touchdown. In the fourth period, Fields ran for a touchdown on a 30-yard end run.

=== Stetson ===
Florida romped over Stetson 64–0. The Hatters resorted to using the forward pass.

=== South Carolina ===
Florida at South Carolina

Team	1	2	3	4	Total
• Florida	0	7	6	0	13
S. Carolina	0	0	0	0	0

- Date: November 22
- Location: Columbia, SC

The Gators line tore through the South Carolina Gamecocks in a 13–0 victory. Crom Anderson made the first touchdown on a 15-yard reception. In the third quarter, Merrin rushed through the line and blocked a punt, and Baker fell on Florida's second touchdown.

The starting lineup was Swanson (left end), Baker (left tackle), Wuthrich (left guard), Perry (center), Connell (right guard), Goldsby (right tackle), Thomas (right end), B. Anderson (quarterback), C. Anderson (left halfback), Sparkman (right halfback), Merrin (fullback).

=== Oglethorpe ===
Oglethorpe at Florida

Team	1	2	3	4	Total
Oglethorpe	7	0	0	0	7
• Florida	0	14	0	0	14

- Date: November 27
- Location: Gainesville, FL

To close the season, the Gators defeated Oglethorpe 14–7. Despite the score and being outweighed, Oglethorpe outplayed the Gators. Oglethorpe's touchdown came conventionally, and both Florida scores were off turnovers: the first after a fumble and the second after a blocked punt.

The starting lineup was Clemons (left end), Baker (left tackle), Wuthrich (left guard), Perry (center), Connell (right guard), Goldsby (right tackle), Thomas (right end), B. Anderson (quarterback), Sparkman (left halfback), C. Anderson (right halfback), Merrin (fullback).

== Postseason ==
Al Buser finished his three-year tenure as the Gators' athletic director and football coach with an overall record of 7–8, and he later became the athletic director for Hamline University.

== Personnel ==
=== Line ===
Player	Position	Games started	Hometown	Prep school	Height	Weight	Age
Paul Baker	guard				6'2"	198	
Gordon Clemons	end				6'0"	155	
H. Connell	guard				6'1"	190	
C. Devane	guard				6'0"	175	
Jack Goldsby	tackle				5'7"	187	
Tootie Perry	center		Rochelle, Florida		5'10"	210	
R. Swanson	end				5'11"	160	
C. Thomas	end				6'0"	170	
H. Warner	tackle				5'10"	178	
E. Wuthrich	tackle				5'8"	185	
M. Yancey	end				5'10"	148	

=== Backfield ===
Player	Position	Games started	Hometown	Prep school	Height	Weight	Age
Crom Anderson	halfback				6'0"	165	
W. Gunn	halfback				5'10"	174	
J. Merrin	fullback				6'0"	168	
Jim Sparkman	halfback				5'9"	165	
L. Wilson	halfback				5'11"	148	

== Bibliography ==
- McEwen, Tom (1974). The Gators: A Story of Florida Football. Huntsville, Alabama: The Strode Publishers. ISBN 0-87397-025-X.
