= 1919 Mississippi A&M Aggies football team =

American college football season

1919 Mississippi A&M Aggies football
- Conference: Southern Intercollegiate Athletic Association
- Record: 6–2 (5–2 SIAA)
- Head coach: Stanley L. Robinson (3rd season)
- Home stadium: New Athletic Field

1919 Southern Intercollegiate Athletic Association football standings
	Conf.					Overall
Team	W		L		T	W		L		T
Auburn $	5	–	1	–	0	8	–	1	–	0
Alabama	6	–	1	–	0	8	–	1	–	0
Centre	1	–	0	–	0	9	–	0	–	0
Kentucky	3	–	1	–	1	3	–	4	–	1
Georgia Tech	3	–	1	–	0	7	–	3	–	0
Tulane	3	–	1	–	1	6	–	2	–	1
Vanderbilt	3	–	1	–	2	5	–	1	–	2
Furman	2	–	1	–	1	6	–	2	–	1
Mississippi A&M	5	–	2	–	0	6	–	2	–	0
Georgia	4	–	2	–	2	4	–	2	–	3
LSU	3	–	2	–	0	6	–	2	–	0
Clemson	3	–	2	–	2	6	–	2	–	2
Florida	2	–	2	–	0	5	–	3	–	0
Wofford	1	–	1	–	0	3	–	2	–	1
Transylvania	1	–	1	–	0	2	–	4	–	0
Ole Miss	1	–	4	–	0	4	–	4	–	0
The Citadel	1	–	4	–	0	4	–	4	–	1
Sewanee	1	–	4	–	0	3	–	6	–	0
Georgetown (KY)	0	–	0	–	0	0	–	2	–	0
Tennessee	0	–	3	–	2	3	–	3	–	3
South Carolina	0	–	4	–	1	1	–	7	–	1
Mercer	0	–	1	–	0	0	–	2	–	0
Mississippi College	0	–	4	–	0	3	–	5	–	1
Howard (AL)	0	–	4	–	0	3	–	5	–	2
$ – Conference champion

The 1919 Mississippi A&M Aggies football team was an American football team that represented the Agricultural and Mechanical College of the State of Mississippi (now known as Mississippi State University) as a member of the Southern Intercollegiate Athletic Association (SIAA) during the 1919 college football season. In their third season under head coach Stanley L. Robinson, Mississippi A&M compiled a 6–2 record.

== Schedule ==
Date	Opponent	Site	Result	Attendance	Source
October 4	Spring Hill*	New Athletic Field; Starkville, MS	W 12–6		
October 11	Mississippi College	New Athletic Field; Starkville, MS	W 56–7		
October 18	at Tennessee	Waite Field; Knoxville, TN	W 6–0		
October 25	Howard (AL)	New Athletic Field; Starkville, MS	W 39–0		
November 1	LSU	New Athletic Field; Starkville, MS (rivalry)	W 6–0		
November 8	vs. Ole Miss	Clarksdale, MS (rivalry)	W 33–0		
November 15	at Auburn	Rickwood Field; Birmingham, AL	L 0–7	8,000	
November 27	at Alabama	Rickwood Field; Birmingham, AL (rivalry)	L 6–14	6,000	
*Non-conference game
