= 1919 Tulane Olive and Blue football team =

American college football season

1919 Tulane Olive and Blue football
- Conference: Southern Intercollegiate Athletic Association
- Record: 6–2–1 (3–1–1 SIAA)
- Head coach: Clark Shaughnessy (5th season)
- Offensive scheme: Single-wing
- Captain: Edwin Linfield
- Home stadium: Second Tulane Stadium

1919 Southern Intercollegiate Athletic Association football standings
	Conf.					Overall
Team	W		L		T	W		L		T
Auburn $	5	–	1	–	0	8	–	1	–	0
Alabama	6	–	1	–	0	8	–	1	–	0
Centre	1	–	0	–	0	9	–	0	–	0
Kentucky	3	–	1	–	1	3	–	4	–	1
Georgia Tech	3	–	1	–	0	7	–	3	–	0
Tulane	3	–	1	–	1	6	–	2	–	1
Vanderbilt	3	–	1	–	2	5	–	1	–	2
Furman	2	–	1	–	1	6	–	2	–	1
Mississippi A&M	5	–	2	–	0	6	–	2	–	0
Georgia	4	–	2	–	2	4	–	2	–	3
LSU	3	–	2	–	0	6	–	2	–	0
Clemson	3	–	2	–	2	6	–	2	–	2
Florida	2	–	2	–	0	5	–	3	–	0
Wofford	1	–	1	–	0	3	–	2	–	1
Transylvania	1	–	1	–	0	2	–	4	–	0
Ole Miss	1	–	4	–	0	4	–	4	–	0
The Citadel	1	–	4	–	0	4	–	4	–	1
Sewanee	1	–	4	–	0	3	–	6	–	0
Georgetown (KY)	0	–	0	–	0	0	–	2	–	0
Tennessee	0	–	3	–	2	3	–	3	–	3
South Carolina	0	–	4	–	1	1	–	7	–	1
Mercer	0	–	1	–	0	0	–	2	–	0
Mississippi College	0	–	4	–	0	3	–	5	–	1
Howard (AL)	0	–	4	–	0	3	–	5	–	2
$ – Conference champion

The 1919 Tulane Olive and Blue football team was an American football team that represented Tulane University as a member of the Southern Intercollegiate Athletic Association (SIAA) during the 1919 college football season. In its fifth year under head coach Clark Shaughnessy, Tulane compiled a 6–2–1 record (3–1–1 in conference games), finished sixth in the SIAA, and outscored opponents by a total of 224 to 55.

== Schedule ==
Date	Opponent	Site	Result	Source
October 4	Jefferson College (LA)*	Tulane Stadium; New Orleans, LA	W 27–0	
October 11	Southwestern Louisiana*	Tulane Stadium; New Orleans, LA	W 73–0	
October 18	at Spring Hill*	Mobile, AL	W 21–0	
October 25	Ole Miss	Tulane Stadium; New Orleans, LA (rivalry)	W 27–12	
November 1	Mississippi College	Tulane Stadium; New Orleans, LA	W 49–0	
November 8	Florida	Tulane Stadium; New Orleans, LA	W 14–2	
November 15	vs. Georgia	Augusta, GA	T 7–7	
November 22	LSU	Tulane Stadium; New Orleans, LA (Battle for the Rag)	L 6–27	
November 27	Washington and Lee*	Tulane Stadium; New Orleans, LA	L 0–7	
*Non-conference game
