= 1919 Ole Miss Rebels football team =

American college football season

1919 Ole Miss Rebels football
- Conference: Southern Intercollegiate Athletic Association
- Record: 4–4 (1–4 SIAA)
- Head coach: R. L. Sullivan (1st season)
- Home stadium: Hemingway Stadium

1919 Southern Intercollegiate Athletic Association football standings
	Conf.					Overall
Team	W		L		T	W		L		T
Auburn $	5	–	1	–	0	8	–	1	–	0
Alabama	6	–	1	–	0	8	–	1	–	0
Centre	1	–	0	–	0	9	–	0	–	0
Kentucky	3	–	1	–	1	3	–	4	–	1
Georgia Tech	3	–	1	–	0	7	–	3	–	0
Tulane	3	–	1	–	1	6	–	2	–	1
Vanderbilt	3	–	1	–	2	5	–	1	–	2
Furman	2	–	1	–	1	6	–	2	–	1
Mississippi A&M	5	–	2	–	0	6	–	2	–	0
Georgia	4	–	2	–	2	4	–	2	–	3
LSU	3	–	2	–	0	6	–	2	–	0
Clemson	3	–	2	–	2	6	–	2	–	2
Florida	2	–	2	–	0	5	–	3	–	0
Wofford	1	–	1	–	0	3	–	2	–	1
Transylvania	1	–	1	–	0	2	–	4	–	0
Ole Miss	1	–	4	–	0	4	–	4	–	0
The Citadel	1	–	4	–	0	4	–	4	–	1
Sewanee	1	–	4	–	0	3	–	6	–	0
Georgetown (KY)	0	–	0	–	0	0	–	2	–	0
Tennessee	0	–	3	–	2	3	–	3	–	3
South Carolina	0	–	4	–	1	1	–	7	–	1
Mercer	0	–	1	–	0	0	–	2	–	0
Mississippi College	0	–	4	–	0	3	–	5	–	1
Howard (AL)	0	–	4	–	0	3	–	5	–	2
$ – Conference champion

The 1919 Ole Miss Rebels football team represented the University of Mississippi (Ole Miss) as a member of the Southern Intercollegiate Athletic Association (SIAA) during the 1919 college football season. Led by first-year head coach R. L. Sullivan, the Rebels compiled an overall record of 4–4, with a mark of 1–4 in conference play. Ole Miss played home games at Hemingway Stadium in Oxford, Mississippi.

== Schedule ==
Date	Opponent	Site	Result	Source
October 4	Jonesboro Aggies*	Hemingway Stadium; Oxford, MS	W 26–0	
October 11	at Alabama	University Field; Tuscaloosa, AL (rivalry)	L 0–49	
October 18	at LSU	State Field; Baton Rouge, LA (rivalry)	L 0–12	
October 25	at Tulane	Tulane Stadium; New Orleans, LA (rivalry)	L 12–27	
October 31	Union (TN)*	Hemingway Stadium; Oxford, MS	W 25–6	
November 8	vs. Mississippi A&M	Clarksdale, MS (Egg Bowl)	L 0–33	
November 15	Southwestern Presbyterian*	Hemingway Stadium; Oxford, MS	W 30–0	
November 27	at Mississippi College*	Fair Grounds; Jackson, MS	W 6–0	
*Non-conference game
