= 1919 LSU Tigers football team =

American college football season

1919 LSU Tigers football
- Conference: Southern Intercollegiate Athletic Association
- Record: 6–2 (3–2 SIAA)
- Head coach: Irving Pray (2nd season)
- Captain: Tom Dutton
- Home stadium: State Field

1919 Southern Intercollegiate Athletic Association football standings
	Conf.					Overall
Team	W		L		T	W		L		T
Auburn $	5	–	1	–	0	8	–	1	–	0
Alabama	6	–	1	–	0	8	–	1	–	0
Centre	1	–	0	–	0	9	–	0	–	0
Kentucky	3	–	1	–	1	3	–	4	–	1
Georgia Tech	3	–	1	–	0	7	–	3	–	0
Tulane	3	–	1	–	1	6	–	2	–	1
Vanderbilt	3	–	1	–	2	5	–	1	–	2
Furman	2	–	1	–	1	6	–	2	–	1
Mississippi A&M	5	–	2	–	0	6	–	2	–	0
Georgia	4	–	2	–	2	4	–	2	–	3
LSU	3	–	2	–	0	6	–	2	–	0
Clemson	3	–	2	–	2	6	–	2	–	2
Florida	2	–	2	–	0	5	–	3	–	0
Wofford	1	–	1	–	0	3	–	2	–	1
Transylvania	1	–	1	–	0	2	–	4	–	0
Ole Miss	1	–	4	–	0	4	–	4	–	0
The Citadel	1	–	4	–	0	4	–	4	–	1
Sewanee	1	–	4	–	0	3	–	6	–	0
Georgetown (KY)	0	–	0	–	0	0	–	2	–	0
Tennessee	0	–	3	–	2	3	–	3	–	3
South Carolina	0	–	4	–	1	1	–	7	–	1
Mercer	0	–	1	–	0	0	–	2	–	0
Mississippi College	0	–	4	–	0	3	–	5	–	1
Howard (AL)	0	–	4	–	0	3	–	5	–	2
$ – Conference champion

The 1919 LSU Tigers football team represented the University of Louisiana (now known as Louisiana State University or LSU) as a member of the Southern Intercollegiate Athletic Association (SIAA) during the 1919 college football season. Led by second-year head coach Irving Pray, the Tigers compiled an overall record of 6–2, with a mark of 3–2 in conference play, and finished tied for 11th in the SIAA. LSU played home games at State Field in Baton Rouge, Louisiana.

== Schedule ==
Date	Opponent	Site	Result	Source
October 4	at Southwestern Louisiana*	State Field; Baton Rouge, LA	W 33–0	
October 11	Jefferson (LA)*	State Field; Baton Rouge, LA	W 38–0	
October 18	Ole Miss	State Field; Baton Rouge, LA (rivalry)	W 13–0	
October 25	vs. Arkansas*	Fair Grounds; Shreveport, LA (rivalry)	W 20–0	
November 1	at Mississippi A&M	New Athletic Field; Starkville, MS (rivalry)	L 0–6	
November 8	Mississippi College	State Field; Baton Rouge, LA	W 24–0	
November 15	Alabama	State Field; Baton Rouge, LA (rivalry)	L 0–23	
November 22	Tulane	Tulane Stadium; New Orleans, LA (rivalry)	W 27–6	
*Non-conference game
