= 1919 Kentucky Wildcats football team =

American college football season

1919 Kentucky Wildcats football
- Conference: Southern Intercollegiate Athletic Association
- Record: 3–4–1 (3–1–1 SIAA)
- Head coach: Thomas Andrew Gill (2nd season)
- Captain: Tony Dishman
- Home stadium: Stoll Field

1919 Southern Intercollegiate Athletic Association football standings
	Conf.					Overall
Team	W		L		T	W		L		T
Auburn $	5	–	1	–	0	8	–	1	–	0
Alabama	6	–	1	–	0	8	–	1	–	0
Centre	1	–	0	–	0	9	–	0	–	0
Kentucky	3	–	1	–	1	3	–	4	–	1
Georgia Tech	3	–	1	–	0	7	–	3	–	0
Tulane	3	–	1	–	1	6	–	2	–	1
Vanderbilt	3	–	1	–	2	5	–	1	–	2
Furman	2	–	1	–	1	6	–	2	–	1
Mississippi A&M	5	–	2	–	0	6	–	2	–	0
Georgia	4	–	2	–	2	4	–	2	–	3
LSU	3	–	2	–	0	6	–	2	–	0
Clemson	3	–	2	–	2	6	–	2	–	2
Florida	2	–	2	–	0	5	–	3	–	0
Wofford	1	–	1	–	0	3	–	2	–	1
Transylvania	1	–	1	–	0	2	–	4	–	0
Ole Miss	1	–	4	–	0	4	–	4	–	0
The Citadel	1	–	4	–	0	4	–	4	–	1
Sewanee	1	–	4	–	0	3	–	6	–	0
Georgetown (KY)	0	–	0	–	0	0	–	2	–	0
Tennessee	0	–	3	–	2	3	–	3	–	3
South Carolina	0	–	4	–	1	1	–	7	–	1
Mercer	0	–	1	–	0	0	–	2	–	0
Mississippi College	0	–	4	–	0	3	–	5	–	1
Howard (AL)	0	–	4	–	0	3	–	5	–	2
$ – Conference champion

The 1919 Kentucky Wildcats football team represented the University of Kentucky as a member of the Southern Intercollegiate Athletic Association (SIAA) during the 1919 college football season. Led by Thomas Andrew Gill in his second and final season as head coach, the Wildcats compiled an overall record of 3–4–1 with a mark of 3–1–1 in SIAA play.

== Schedule ==
Date	Opponent	Site	Result	Source
October 4	Georgetown (KY)	Stoll Field; Lexington, KY	W 12–0	
October 11	Indiana*	Stoll Field; Lexington, KY (rivalry)	L 0–24	
October 18	at Ohio State*	Ohio Field; Columbus, OH	L 0–49	
October 25	at Sewanee	McGee Field; Sewanee, TN	W 6–0	
November 1	Vanderbilt	Stoll Field; Lexington, KY (rivalry)	T 0–0	
November 8	at Cincinnati*	Carson Field; Cincinnati, OH	L 0–7	
November 15	Centre*	Cheek Field; Danville, KY (rivalry)	L 0–56	
November 27	Tennessee	Waite Field; Knoxville, TN (rivalry)	W 13–0	
*Non-conference game
