= 1919 Howard Bulldogs football team =

American college football season

1919 Howard Bulldogs football
- Conference: Southern Intercollegiate Athletic Association
- Record: 3–5–2 (0–4 SIAA)
- Head coach: Chester C. Dillon (1st season)
- Captain: Peahead Walker
- Home stadium: Eagles Field; Rickwood Field

1919 Southern Intercollegiate Athletic Association football standings
	Conf.					Overall
Team	W		L		T	W		L		T
Auburn $	5	–	1	–	0	8	–	1	–	0
Alabama	6	–	1	–	0	8	–	1	–	0
Centre	1	–	0	–	0	9	–	0	–	0
Kentucky	3	–	1	–	1	3	–	4	–	1
Georgia Tech	3	–	1	–	0	7	–	3	–	0
Tulane	3	–	1	–	1	6	–	2	–	1
Vanderbilt	3	–	1	–	2	5	–	1	–	2
Furman	2	–	1	–	1	6	–	2	–	1
Mississippi A&M	5	–	2	–	0	6	–	2	–	0
Georgia	4	–	2	–	2	4	–	2	–	3
LSU	3	–	2	–	0	6	–	2	–	0
Clemson	3	–	2	–	2	6	–	2	–	2
Florida	2	–	2	–	0	5	–	3	–	0
Wofford	1	–	1	–	0	3	–	2	–	1
Transylvania	1	–	1	–	0	2	–	4	–	0
Ole Miss	1	–	4	–	0	4	–	4	–	0
The Citadel	1	–	4	–	0	4	–	4	–	1
Sewanee	1	–	4	–	0	3	–	6	–	0
Georgetown (KY)	0	–	0	–	0	0	–	2	–	0
Tennessee	0	–	3	–	2	3	–	3	–	3
South Carolina	0	–	4	–	1	1	–	7	–	1
Mercer	0	–	1	–	0	0	–	2	–	0
Mississippi College	0	–	4	–	0	3	–	5	–	1
Howard (AL)	0	–	4	–	0	3	–	5	–	2
$ – Conference champion

The 1919 Howard Bulldogs football team was an American football team that represented Howard College (now known as the Samford University) as a member of the Southern Intercollegiate Athletic Association (SIAA) during the 1919 college football season. In their first year under head coach Chester C. Dillon, the team compiled a 3–5–2 record.

== Schedule ==
Date	Opponent	Site	Result	Source
October 4	Auburn	Rickwood Field; Birmingham, AL	L 6–19	
October 11	at Sewanee	Hardee Field; Sewanee, TN	L 0–18	
October 18	at Alabama	University Field; Tuscaloosa, AL	L 0–48	
October 25	at Mississippi A&M	New Athletic Field; Starkville, MS	L 0–39	
October 28	at Morgan School (TN)*	Lewisburg, TN	W 13–0	
October 31	Hamilton (AL)*	Eagles Field; Birmingham, AL	T 7–7	
November 9	vs. Birmingham–Southern*	Rickwood Field; Birmingham, AL	W 2–0	
November 14	at Marion*	Marion, AL	L 0–12	
November 21	Hamilton (AL)*	Eagles Field; Birmingham, AL	W 82–0	
November 27	at Spring Hill*	Mobile, AL	T 6–6	
*Non-conference game
