= 1919 Auburn Tigers football team =

American college football season

1919 Auburn Tigers football

SIAA champion
- Conference: Southern Intercollegiate Athletic Association
- Record: 8–1 (5–1 SIAA)
- Head coach: Mike Donahue (15th season)
- Base defense: 7–2–2
- Captain: Pete Bonner
- Home stadium: Drake Field; Rickwood Field

1919 Southern Intercollegiate Athletic Association football standings
	Conf.					Overall
Team	W		L		T	W		L		T
Auburn $	5	–	1	–	0	8	–	1	–	0
Alabama	6	–	1	–	0	8	–	1	–	0
Centre	1	–	0	–	0	9	–	0	–	0
Kentucky	3	–	1	–	1	3	–	4	–	1
Georgia Tech	3	–	1	–	0	7	–	3	–	0
Tulane	3	–	1	–	1	6	–	2	–	1
Vanderbilt	3	–	1	–	2	5	–	1	–	2
Furman	2	–	1	–	1	6	–	2	–	1
Mississippi A&M	5	–	2	–	0	6	–	2	–	0
Georgia	4	–	2	–	2	4	–	2	–	3
LSU	3	–	2	–	0	6	–	2	–	0
Clemson	3	–	2	–	2	6	–	2	–	2
Florida	2	–	2	–	0	5	–	3	–	0
Wofford	1	–	1	–	0	3	–	2	–	1
Transylvania	1	–	1	–	0	2	–	4	–	0
Ole Miss	1	–	4	–	0	4	–	4	–	0
The Citadel	1	–	4	–	0	4	–	4	–	1
Sewanee	1	–	4	–	0	3	–	6	–	0
Georgetown (KY)	0	–	0	–	0	0	–	2	–	0
Tennessee	0	–	3	–	2	3	–	3	–	3
South Carolina	0	–	4	–	1	1	–	7	–	1
Mercer	0	–	1	–	0	0	–	2	–	0
Mississippi College	0	–	4	–	0	3	–	5	–	1
Howard (AL)	0	–	4	–	0	3	–	5	–	2
$ – Conference champion

The 1919 Auburn Tigers football team represented Auburn University in the 1919 college football season. It was the Tigers' 28th overall season and they competed as a member of the Southern Intercollegiate Athletic Association (SIAA). The team was led by head coach Mike Donahue, in his 15th year, and played their home games at Drake Field in Auburn, Alabama. They finished with a record of eight wins and one loss (8–1 overall, 5–1 in the SIAA) and as SIAA champions.

The team's captain was tackle Pete Bonner. His brother Thomas Herbert "Herb" Bonner also attended Auburn and was a guard on the team.

== Schedule ==
Date	Opponent	Site	Result	Attendance	Source
September 27	Marion*	Drake Field; Auburn, AL	W 37–0		
October 4	at Howard (AL)	Rickwood Field; Birmingham, AL	W 19–6		
October 11	Camp Gordon*	Drake Field; Auburn, AL	W 25–13		
October 17	Clemson	Drake Field; Auburn, AL (rivalry)	W 7–0		
October 25	at Vanderbilt	Dudley Field; Nashville, TN	L 6–7		
November 1	vs. Georgia	Memorial Stadium; Columbus, GA (rivalry)	W 7–0	8,000	
November 8	at Spring Hill*	Mobile, AL	W 19–0		
November 15	Mississippi A&M	Rickwood Field; Birmingham, AL	W 7–0	8,000	
November 27	at Georgia Tech	Grant Field; Atlanta, GA (rivalry)	W 14–7		
*Non-conference game

== Game summaries ==
=== Marion Military Institute ===
The season opened with a 37–0 victory over the Marion Military Institute.

=== Howard (AL) ===
In the second week of play, the Tigers had a poor showing but managed to beat the Howard Bulldogs, 19–6.

=== Camp Gordon ===
Camp Gordon at Auburn

Team	1	2	3	4	Total
Camp Gordon	7	0	6	0	13
• Auburn	6	0	0	19	25

- Date: October 10
- Location: Drake Field
  Auburn, Alabama
- Referee: Kid Woodruff

Auburn came back to beat the Fifth Division of Camp Gordon 25–13 in a "nerve-wracking" game. Beretsky of the fifth division ran a kickoff 90 yards for a touchdown. The pounding of Red Howard and Ed Sherling led the comeback.

The starting lineup was Shirley (left end), Bonner (left tackle), Sizemore (left guard), Snider (center), Warren (right guard), Rogers (right tackle), Pruitt (right end), Trapp (quarterback), Scott (left halfback), Howard (right halfback), Shirling (fullback).

=== Clemson ===
Clemson at Auburn

Team	1	2	3	4	Total
Clemson	0	0	0	0	0
• Auburn	0	0	0	7	7

- Date: October 17
- Location: Drake Field
  Auburn, Alabama
- Referee: Alcock (Washington & Lee)

Auburn beat Clemson 7–0. "It was anybody's game until the last quarter", when Sherling scored Auburn's lone touchdown. Rodney Ollinger starred on defense.

The starting lineup was Ollinger (left end), Bonner (left tackle), Sizemore (left guard), Snider (center), H. Bonner (right guard), Rogers (right tackle), Pruitt (right end), Trapp (quarterback), Scott (left halfback), Howard (right halfback), Shirling (fullback).

=== At Vanderbilt ===
Auburn at Vanderbilt

Team	1	2	3	4	Total
Auburn	0	6	0	0	6
• Vanderbilt	0	7	0	0	7

- Date: October 25
- Location: Dudley Field
  Nashville, Tennessee
- Referee: Bradley Walker

Auburn suffered the season's only loss to Dan McGugin's Vanderbilt Commodores 7–6. Josh Cody returned a fumble 15 yards for a touchdown and made the winning extra point. A bit after, Ed Sherling ran in from the 1-yard line, but Pete Bonner missed goal.

Vanderbilt's Tom Lipscomb and Frank Goar were sent in on Auburn's last drive. Goar had been sick and Lipscomb was suffering from an injured ankle. The two spurned the team to victory in what the Vanderbilt yearbook called "the greatest defensive stand ever staged by any Vanderbilt team."

The starting lineup was Ollinger (left end), Bonner (left tackle), Sizemore (left guard), Snider (center), H. Bonner (right guard), Rogers (right tackle), Pruitt (right end), Trapp (quarterback), Scott (left halfback), Howard (right halfback), Shirling (fullback).

=== Georgia ===
Auburn vs. Georgia

Team	1	2	3	4	Total
• Auburn	7	0	0	0	7
Georgia	0	0	0	0	0

- Date: November 1
- Location: Memorial Stadium
  Columbus, Georgia
- Game attendance: 8,000
- Game weather: Heavy rain
- Referee: John Counselman

In heavy rain and mud, Auburn defeated Georgia 7–0. Red Howard ran through the entire Georgia team for 52 yards and the touchdown.

The starting lineup was Ollinger (left end), Bonner (left tackle), Sizemore (left guard), Caton (center), H. Bonner (right guard), Rogers (right tackle), Pruitt (right end), Trapp (quarterback), Williamson (left halfback), Howard (right halfback), Shirling (fullback).

=== Spring Hill ===
The Spring Hill Badgers, coached by Auburn great Moon Ducote, fell to Auburn 10–0. A slippery field led to weak punting. The starting lineup was Ollinger (left end), H. Bonner (left tackle), Griffin (left guard), Snider (center), Rogers (right guard), Martin (right tackle), Pruitt (right end), Trapp (quarterback), Shirey (left halfback), Stubbs (right halfback), Shirling (fullback).

=== Mississippi A&M ===
Mississippi A&M at Auburn

Team	1	2	3	4	Total
Miss. A&M	0	0	0	0	0
• Auburn	0	7	0	0	7

- Date: November 15
- Location: Rickwood Field
  Birmingham, Alabama
- Game attendance: 8,000
- Referee: Holligan (Michigan)

In a meeting of unbeatens, Auburn beat the Mississippi Aggies 7–0. Herb Bonner recovered a fumble for the game's only touchdown. Rodney Ollinger was as a standout as a punter and on defense.

The starting lineup was Ollinger (left end), Bonner (left tackle), Warren (left guard), Caton (center), Rogers (right guard), H. Bonner (right tackle), Pruitt (right end), Trapp (quarterback), Williamson (left halfback), Howard (right halfback), Shirling (fullback).

=== At Georgia Tech ===
Auburn at Georgia Tech

Team	1	2	3	4	Total
• Auburn	0	2	6	6	14
Ga. Tech	7	0	0	0	7

- Date: November 27
- Location: Grant Field
  Atlanta
- Referee: Jogger Elcock

In John Heisman's last game as Georgia Tech head coach, Auburn gave Tech its first loss to an SIAA school in five years (since Auburn won in 1914) by a 14–7 score. Fatty Warren proved the star of the game.

The first touchdown of the game was made by Jack McDonough. Judy Harlan later fell on his own punt for a safety. In the third quarter, Warren blocked a Dewey Scarboro punt and Sloan recovered the ball and ran it 35 yards for a touchdown. Warren "waddled" for a 40-yard touchdown off a Jimmy Brewster fumble for the 14–7 victory. Zelda Sayre sent captain Pete Bonner a telegram after the win, it read:

"Shooting a seven, aren't we awfully proud of the boys, give them my love—knew we could."

She signed it "Zelder Sayre".

The starting lineup was Ollinger (left end), P. Bonner (left tackle), Sloan (left guard), Caton (center), Rogers (right guard), Warren (right tackle), Pruitt (right end), Trapp (quarterback), Stubbs (left halfback), Howard (right halfback), Shirling (fullback).

== SIAA title ==
For defeating Tech and due to charges of professionalism aimed at undefeated Centre, Auburn was SIAA champion. Fuzzy Woodruff recalls "Auburn claimed it. "We defeated Tech" said Auburn. "Yes, but we defeated you" said Vanderbilt. "Yes", said Alabama, "but Tech, Tulane, and Tennessee took your measure. We defeated Georgia Tech, who tied Tulane, so we are champions...The newspapers, however, more or less generally supported the claim of Auburn..."
