= 1919 South Carolina Gamecocks football team =

American college football season

1919 South Carolina Gamecocks football
- Conference: Southern Intercollegiate Athletic Association
- Record: 1–7–1 (0–4–1 SIAA)
- Head coach: Dixon Foster (2nd season)
- Captain: Hayward Brockington
- Home stadium: College Park

1919 Southern Intercollegiate Athletic Association football standings
	Conf.					Overall
Team	W		L		T	W		L		T
Auburn $	5	–	1	–	0	8	–	1	–	0
Alabama	6	–	1	–	0	8	–	1	–	0
Centre	1	–	0	–	0	9	–	0	–	0
Kentucky	3	–	1	–	1	3	–	4	–	1
Georgia Tech	3	–	1	–	0	7	–	3	–	0
Tulane	3	–	1	–	1	6	–	2	–	1
Vanderbilt	3	–	1	–	2	5	–	1	–	2
Furman	2	–	1	–	1	6	–	2	–	1
Mississippi A&M	5	–	2	–	0	6	–	2	–	0
Georgia	4	–	2	–	2	4	–	2	–	3
LSU	3	–	2	–	0	6	–	2	–	0
Clemson	3	–	2	–	2	6	–	2	–	2
Florida	2	–	2	–	0	5	–	3	–	0
Wofford	1	–	1	–	0	3	–	2	–	1
Transylvania	1	–	1	–	0	2	–	4	–	0
Ole Miss	1	–	4	–	0	4	–	4	–	0
The Citadel	1	–	4	–	0	4	–	4	–	1
Sewanee	1	–	4	–	0	3	–	6	–	0
Georgetown (KY)	0	–	0	–	0	0	–	2	–	0
Tennessee	0	–	3	–	2	3	–	3	–	3
South Carolina	0	–	4	–	1	1	–	7	–	1
Mercer	0	–	1	–	0	0	–	2	–	0
Mississippi College	0	–	4	–	0	3	–	5	–	1
Howard (AL)	0	–	4	–	0	3	–	5	–	2
$ – Conference champion

The 1919 South Carolina Gamecocks football team was an American football team that represented the University of South Carolina as a member of the Southern Intercollegiate Athletic Association during the 1919 college football season. Led by Dixon Foster in his second and final season as head coach, the team compiled an overall record of 1–7–1 with a mark of 0–4–1 in SIAA play.

== Schedule ==
Date	Opponent	Site	Result	Source
September 27	Presbyterian*	College Park; Columbia, SC	L 0–6	
October 4	Erskine*	College Park; Columbia, SC	W 6–0	
October 11	at Georgia	Sanford Field; Athens, GA (rivalry)	L 0–14	
October 18	Davidson*	College Park; Columbia, SC	L 0–7	
October 30	Clemson	State Fairgrounds; Columbia, SC (rivalry)	L 6–19	
November 8	Tennessee	College Park; Columbia, SC (rivalry)	T 6–6	
November 15	at Washington and Lee*	Wilson Field; Lexington, VA	L 0–26	
November 22	Florida	College Park; Columbia, SC	L 0–13	
November 27	The Citadel	College Park; Columbia, SC	L 7–14	
*Non-conference game
