= Howard Van Antwerp =

American football player and attorney (1898–1992)

Profile
- Position: Guard

Personal information
- Born: April 8, 1898; Mount Sterling, Kentucky, U.S.
- Died: June 26, 1992 (aged 94); Ashland, Kentucky, U.S.

Career information
- College: Centre (1919)

Awards and highlights
- SIAA championship (1919); All-Southern (1919)

Howard Van Antwerp Jr. (April 4, 1898 – June 26, 1992) was an American college football player and attorney.

== Centre College ==
Van Antwerp was valedictorian of the class of 1920 at Centre College in Danville, Kentucky. He was also a prominent member of the football team, selected All-Southern at his guard position in 1919, a year in which Centre went undefeated.
