= 1919 Sewanee Tigers football team =

American college football season

1919 Sewanee Tigers football
- Conference: Southern Intercollegiate Athletic Association
- Record: 3–6 (1–4 SIAA)
- Head coach: Earl Abell (1st season)
- Captain: Thomas Harper
- Home stadium: Hardee Field

1919 Southern Intercollegiate Athletic Association football standings
| | Conf. | | | | | Overall |
| Team | W | | L | | T | W | | L | | T |
|---|---|---|---|---|---|---|---|---|---|---|
| Auburn $ | 5 | – | 1 | – | 0 | 8 | – | 1 | – | 0 |
| Alabama | 6 | – | 1 | – | 0 | 8 | – | 1 | – | 0 |
| Centre | 1 | – | 0 | – | 0 | 9 | – | 0 | – | 0 |
| Kentucky | 3 | – | 1 | – | 1 | 3 | – | 4 | – | 1 |
| Georgia Tech | 3 | – | 1 | – | 0 | 7 | – | 3 | – | 0 |
| Tulane | 3 | – | 1 | – | 1 | 6 | – | 2 | – | 1 |
| Vanderbilt | 3 | – | 1 | – | 2 | 5 | – | 1 | – | 2 |
| Furman | 2 | – | 1 | – | 1 | 6 | – | 2 | – | 1 |
| Mississippi A&M | 5 | – | 2 | – | 0 | 6 | – | 2 | – | 0 |
| Georgia | 4 | – | 2 | – | 2 | 4 | – | 2 | – | 3 |
| LSU | 3 | – | 2 | – | 0 | 6 | – | 2 | – | 0 |
| Clemson | 3 | – | 2 | – | 2 | 6 | – | 2 | – | 2 |
| Florida | 2 | – | 2 | – | 0 | 5 | – | 3 | – | 0 |
| Wofford | 1 | – | 1 | – | 0 | 3 | – | 2 | – | 1 |
| Transylvania | 1 | – | 1 | – | 0 | 2 | – | 4 | – | 0 |
| Ole Miss | 1 | – | 4 | – | 0 | 4 | – | 4 | – | 0 |
| The Citadel | 1 | – | 4 | – | 0 | 4 | – | 4 | – | 1 |
| Sewanee | 1 | – | 4 | – | 0 | 3 | – | 6 | – | 0 |
| Georgetown (KY) | 0 | – | 0 | – | 0 | 0 | – | 2 | – | 0 |
| Tennessee | 0 | – | 3 | – | 2 | 3 | – | 3 | – | 3 |
| South Carolina | 0 | – | 4 | – | 1 | 1 | – | 7 | – | 1 |
| Mercer | 0 | – | 1 | – | 0 | 0 | – | 2 | – | 0 |
| Mississippi College | 0 | – | 4 | – | 0 | 3 | – | 5 | – | 1 |
| Howard (AL) | 0 | – | 4 | – | 0 | 3 | – | 5 | – | 2 |
$ – Conference champion

The 1919 Sewanee Tigers football team represented Sewanee: The University of the South during the 1919 college football season as a member of the Southern Intercollegiate Athletic Association (SIAA). The Tigers were led by head coach Earl Abell in his first season and finished with a record of three wins and six losses (3–6 overall, 1–4 in the SIAA).

== Schedule ==
| Date | Opponent | Site | Result | Attendance | Source |
|---|---|---|---|---|---|
| October 3 | Morgan Training School* | Hardee Field; Sewanee, TN | W 7–0 | | |
| October 11 | Howard (AL) | Hardee Field; Sewanee, TN | W 18–0 | | |
| October 18 | at Georgia | Sanford Field; Athens, GA | L 0–13 | | |
| October 25 | Kentucky | Hardee Field; Sewanee, TN | L 0–6 | | |
| November 1 | at Alabama | Rickwood Field; Birmingham, AL | L 0–40 | | |
| November 8 | Oglethorpe* | Hardee Field; Sewanee, TN | W 21–0 | | |
| November 15 | at Rice* | Rice Field; Houston, TX | L 7–19 | | |
| November 18 | at Baylor* | Carroll Field; Waco, TX | L 7–21 | 8,000 | |
| November 27 | at Vanderbilt | Dudley Field; Nashville, TN (rivalry) | L 21–33 | | |
*Non-conference game
