= 1919 Vanderbilt Commodores football team =

American college football season

1919 Vanderbilt Commodores football
- Conference: Southern Intercollegiate Athletic Association
- Record: 5–1–2 (3–1–2 SIAA)
- Head coach: Dan McGugin (15th season)
- Offensive scheme: Short punt
- Captain: Josh Cody
- Home stadium: Dudley Field

1919 Southern Intercollegiate Athletic Association football standings
	Conf.					Overall
Team	W		L		T	W		L		T
Auburn $	5	–	1	–	0	8	–	1	–	0
Alabama	6	–	1	–	0	8	–	1	–	0
Centre	1	–	0	–	0	9	–	0	–	0
Kentucky	3	–	1	–	1	3	–	4	–	1
Georgia Tech	3	–	1	–	0	7	–	3	–	0
Tulane	3	–	1	–	1	6	–	2	–	1
Vanderbilt	3	–	1	–	2	5	–	1	–	2
Furman	2	–	1	–	1	6	–	2	–	1
Mississippi A&M	5	–	2	–	0	6	–	2	–	0
Georgia	4	–	2	–	2	4	–	2	–	3
LSU	3	–	2	–	0	6	–	2	–	0
Clemson	3	–	2	–	2	6	–	2	–	2
Florida	2	–	2	–	0	5	–	3	–	0
Wofford	1	–	1	–	0	3	–	2	–	1
Transylvania	1	–	1	–	0	2	–	4	–	0
Ole Miss	1	–	4	–	0	4	–	4	–	0
The Citadel	1	–	4	–	0	4	–	4	–	1
Sewanee	1	–	4	–	0	3	–	6	–	0
Georgetown (KY)	0	–	0	–	0	0	–	2	–	0
Tennessee	0	–	3	–	2	3	–	3	–	3
South Carolina	0	–	4	–	1	1	–	7	–	1
Mercer	0	–	1	–	0	0	–	2	–	0
Mississippi College	0	–	4	–	0	3	–	5	–	1
Howard (AL)	0	–	4	–	0	3	–	5	–	2
$ – Conference champion

The 1919 Vanderbilt Commodores football team represented Vanderbilt University in the 1919 college football season. The 1919 season was Dan McGugin's 15th year as head coach. McGugin was returning from his stent in the Army during World War I where he was relieved by interim head coach Ray Morrison. Josh Cody was selected third-team All-America by Walter Camp, for the second time (he also received the honor in 1915).

== Schedule ==
Date	Opponent	Site	Result	Source
October 4	Union (TN)*	Dudley Field; Nashville, TN	W 40–0	
October 11	Tennessee	Dudley Field; Nashville, TN (rivalry)	T 3–3	
October 18	at Georgia Tech	Grant Field; Atlanta, GA (rivalry)	L 0–20	
October 25	Auburn	Dudley Field; Nashville, TN	W 7–6	
November 1	at Kentucky	Stoll Field; Lexington, KY (rivalry)	T 0–0	
November 8	Alabama	Dudley Field; Nashville, TN	W 16–12	
November 15	at Virginia*	Lambeth Field; Charlottesville, VA	W 10–6	
November 27	Sewanee	Dudley Field; Nashville, TN (rivalry)	W 33–21	
*Non-conference game

== Before the season ==
After World War I, Josh Cody returned to Vanderbilt for his senior year. He was elected captain.

== Game summaries ==
=== Union (TN) ===
The season opened with a 41–0 victory over the Union Bulldogs.

=== Tennessee ===
A steady rain hindered the Tennessee game which ended a 3–3 tie. Josh Cody scored on a 30-yard drop kick, while Buck Hatcher made a 25-yard drop kick.

=== At Georgia Tech ===
Vanderbilt fell to Georgia Tech in the mud 20–0. Buck Flowers and fullback Gaiver starred.

The starting lineup was Adams (left end), Cody (left tackle), Bailey (left guard), Early (center), Buckner (right guard), Lipscomb (right tackle), Goar (right end), Sherman (quarterback), Floyd (left halfback), Berryhill (right halfback), Hendrix (fullback).

=== Auburn ===
Auburn at Vanderbilt

Team	1	2	3	4	Total
Auburn	0	6	0	0	6
• Vanderbilt	0	7	0	0	7

- Date: October 25
- Location: Dudley Field
  Nashville, Tennessee
- Referee: Bradley Walker

SIAA champion Auburn suffered its only loss to Vanderbilt, 7–6. Josh Cody returned a fumble 15 yards for a touchdown and made the winning extra point. A bit after, Ed Sherling ran in from the 1-yard line, but Pete Bonner missed goal.

Tom Lipscomb and Frank Goar were sent in on Auburn's last drive. Goar had been sick and Lipscomb was suffering from an injured ankle. The two spurned the team to victory in what the Vanderbilt yearbook called "the greatest defensive stand ever staged by any Vanderbilt team."

The starting lineup was Zerfoss (left end), Cody (left tackle), Buckner (left guard), Early (center) Holmes (right guard), Bailey (right tackle), Adams (right end), Latham (quarterback), Berryhill (left halfback), Floyd (right halfback), Wiggs (fullback).

=== Kentucky ===
On Stoll Field in Lexington, the Kentucky Wildcats fought the Commodores to a scoreless tie.

=== Alabama ===
Team	1	2	3	4	Total
Alabama	0	0	6	6	12
• Vanderbilt	0	13	0	3	16

- Date: November 8
- Location: Dudley Field
  Nashville, Tennessee

On a muddy field, the Commodores beat the Alabama Crimson Tide 16–12, giving the Tide their only loss of the season.

On its first drive of the game, Alabama took the ball to the Vanderbilt 2-yard line, but then fumbled the ball that was recovered by Josh Cody of the Commodores to end the scoring threat. The second Alabama fumble resulted in the first touchdown of the game. Early in the second quarter, Riggs Stephenson fumbled the ball that was recovered by Tommy Zerfoss and returned 35-yards for a 7–0 Vanderbilt lead. They further extended their lead to 13–0 at halftime on a 20-yard Grailey Berryhill touchdown run.

Alabama rallied in the second half with a pair of two-yards Stephenson touchdown runs in the third and fourth quarter that made the score 13–12. Cody then provided for the final margin in the 16–12 Commodores' victory with his 30-yard field goal in the fourth quarter.

The starting lineup was Adams (left end), Cody (left tackle), Hendrix (left guard), Early (center), Bailey (right guard), Lipscomb (right tackle), Westgate (right end), Latham (quarterback), Richardson (left halfback), Zerfoss (right halfback), Wiggs (fullback).

=== At Virginia ===
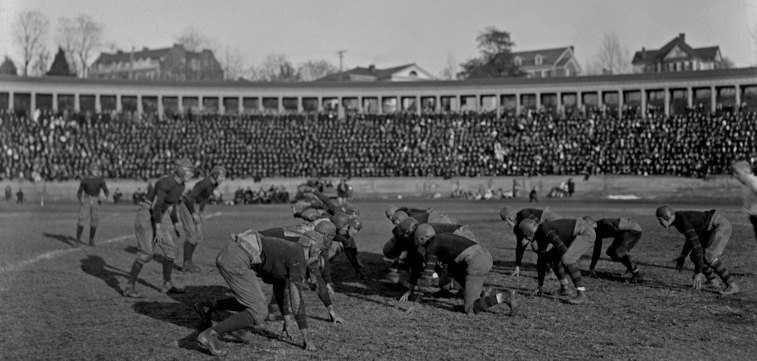
Vanderbilt v. Virginia

Vanderbilt met the Virginia Orange and Blue on Lambeth Field and won 10–6. The starting lineup was Zerfoss (left end), Cody (left tackle), Hendrix (left guard), Early (center) Bailey (right guard), Lipscomb (right tackle), Adams (right end), Latham (quarterback), Berryhill (left halfback), Wade (right halfback), Wiggs (fullback).

=== Sewanee ===
On a field wet from previous rains, the Sewanee Tigers put up a game fight as Vanderbilt won 33–21. The starting lineup was Zerfoss (left end), Cody (left tackle), Hendrix (left guard), Early (center), Basley (right guard), Lipscomb (right tackle), Adams (right end), Latham (quarterback), Richardson (left halfback), Floyd (right halfback), Wade (fullback).

== After the season ==
Fuzzy Woodruff recalls "Auburn claimed it. "We defeated Tech" said Auburn. "Yes, but we defeated you" said Vanderbilt. "Yes", said Alabama, "but Tech, Tulane, and Tennessee took your measure. We defeated Georgia Tech, who tied Tulane, so we are champions...The newspapers, however, more or less generally supported the claim of Auburn..."
