= 1919 Tennessee Volunteers football team =

American college football season

1919 Tennessee Volunteers football
- Conference: Southern Intercollegiate Athletic Association
- Record: 3–3–3 (0–3–2 SIAA)
- Head coach: John R. Bender (2nd season)
- Captain: Chink Lowe
- Home stadium: Waite Field

1919 Southern Intercollegiate Athletic Association football standings
	Conf.					Overall
Team	W		L		T	W		L		T
Auburn $	5	–	1	–	0	8	–	1	–	0
Alabama	6	–	1	–	0	8	–	1	–	0
Centre	1	–	0	–	0	9	–	0	–	0
Kentucky	3	–	1	–	1	3	–	4	–	1
Georgia Tech	3	–	1	–	0	7	–	3	–	0
Tulane	3	–	1	–	1	6	–	2	–	1
Vanderbilt	3	–	1	–	2	5	–	1	–	2
Furman	2	–	1	–	1	6	–	2	–	1
Mississippi A&M	5	–	2	–	0	6	–	2	–	0
Georgia	4	–	2	–	2	4	–	2	–	3
LSU	3	–	2	–	0	6	–	2	–	0
Clemson	3	–	2	–	2	6	–	2	–	2
Florida	2	–	2	–	0	5	–	3	–	0
Wofford	1	–	1	–	0	3	–	2	–	1
Transylvania	1	–	1	–	0	2	–	4	–	0
Ole Miss	1	–	4	–	0	4	–	4	–	0
The Citadel	1	–	4	–	0	4	–	4	–	1
Sewanee	1	–	4	–	0	3	–	6	–	0
Georgetown (KY)	0	–	0	–	0	0	–	2	–	0
Tennessee	0	–	3	–	2	3	–	3	–	3
South Carolina	0	–	4	–	1	1	–	7	–	1
Mercer	0	–	1	–	0	0	–	2	–	0
Mississippi College	0	–	4	–	0	3	–	5	–	1
Howard (AL)	0	–	4	–	0	3	–	5	–	2
$ – Conference champion

The 1919 Tennessee Volunteers football team represented the University of Tennessee in the 1919 college football season. The Vols won three, lost three, and tied three. This was the first varsity team for Tennessee since the 1916 season. Tennessee did not field official football teams in 1917 and 1918 due to World War I.

== Schedule ==
Date	Opponent	Site	Result	Source
September 27	Tusculum*	Waite Field; Knoxville, TN	W 29–6	
October 3	Maryville (TN)*	Waite Field; Knoxville, TN	W 32–2	
October 11	at Vanderbilt	Old Dudley Field; Nashville, TN (rivalry)	T 3–3	
October 18	Mississippi A&M	Waite Field; Knoxville, TN	L 0–6	
October 25	at Clemson	Riggs Field; Clemson, SC	L 0–14	
November 1	North Carolina*^{†}	Waite Field; Knoxville, TN	T 0–0	
November 8	at South Carolina	College Park; Columbia, SC (rivalry)	T 6–6	
November 15	Cincinnati*	Waite Field; Knoxville, TN	W 33–12	
November 27	at Kentucky	Stoll Field; Lexington, KY (rivalry)	L 0–13	
*Non-conference game; ^{†}Homecoming
