= John Rush =

John Rush may refer to:

- John Rush (cricketer) (1910–1982), Australian cricketer
- John Rush (Canadian football) (born 1993), Canadian football fullback
- John Rush (Medal of Honor) (1837–1916), Union Navy fireman and Medal of Honor recipient
- John H. Rush (1874–1958), American football player and coach and track athlete
