= Fred Murray (coach) =

American football and basketball coach

Biographical details
- Born: c. 1892
- Died: July 30, 1954 (aged 62); Boston, Massachusetts, U.S.

Playing career

Football
- 1914: Georgetown
- Position: Halfback

Coaching career (HC unless noted)

Football
- 1916–1917: Gloucester HS (MA)
- 1919: Rhode Island State
- 1920–?: Boston English HS (MA)
- 1936–: Roslindale HS (MA)
- 1953: Roslindale HS (MA) (assistant)

Basketball
- 1919–1920: Rhode Island State

Baseball
- 1917–1918: Gloucester HS (MA)
- 1920: Rhode Island State

Head coaching record
- Overall: 0–7–1 (college football); 3–8 (college basketball)

Frederick J. Murray (c. 1892 – July 30, 1954) was an American football player, coach, and official and coach of baseball, basketball, and track and field. He served as the head football coach at Rhode Island State College, now the University of Rhode Island, in 1919, compiling a record of 0–7–1. Murray was also Rhode Island State's head basketball coach for one season in 1919–20, tallying a mark of 3–8.

Murray graduated from the Boston Latin School in 1911 and attended Georgetown University, where he played college football and was captain of the 1914 Georgetown Blue and Gray football team. He began coaching in 1916 at Gloucester High School in Gloucester, Massachusetts. After coaching football and baseball at Gloucester for two years, he served in the United States Army as an aviator during World War I. In 1920, Murray was hired to coach at The English High School in Boston. In 1936, he was hired to coach at Boston's Roslindale High School.

Murray also worked as a college football official. He officiated the 1941 Sugar Bowl in New Orleans, won by Boston College. He died on July 30, 1952, at Carney Hospital in Boston, following a three-week illness.

== Head coaching record ==
=== College football ===
Year	Team	Overall	Conference	Standing	Bowl/playoffs
Rhode Island State (Athletic League of New England State Colleges) (1919)
1919	Rhode Island State	0–7–1	0–2		
Rhode Island State:		0–7–1	0–2		
Total:		0–7–1			
