= Gardner Dow =

American football player (1898–1919)

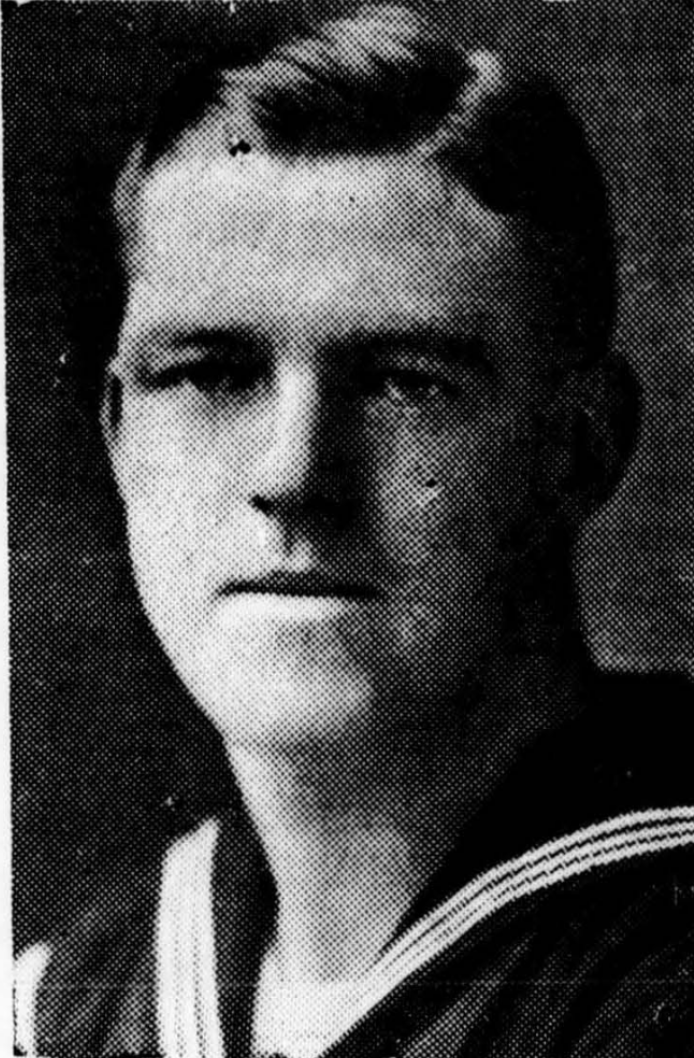
- Gardner Dow in 1918

Profile
- Position: Center
- Class: 1921

Personal information
- Born: March 15, 1898; New Haven, Connecticut, US
- Died: September 27, 1919 (aged 21); Durham, New Hampshire, US

Career information
- High school: New Haven High School
- College: Connecticut Agricultural College (1919)

Gardner Dow (March 15, 1898 – September 27, 1919) was an American college football player for the Connecticut Aggies. He died of traumatic brain injury sustained in a game against the University of New Hampshire. Connecticut Agricultural College (now the University of Connecticut) named its athletic field in his honor. The Gardner Dow Field served as the football team's home pitch for decades.

== Biography ==
Dow was born in New Haven, Connecticut, to parents Edwin C. Dow and Grace (French) Dow. His father was a bookkeeper; his mother was a homemaker. Dow was the youngest of three brothers. William F. and Arthur K. were respectively 15 and 12 years older than he.

Dow studied and played football at New Haven High School. Soon after receiving with his high school diploma, he joined the Class of 1921 at Connecticut Agricultural College in Storrs in the fall of 1917. He enrolled in the four-year agricultural sciences program. As a freshman, Dow participated in intramural sports and distinguished himself in the one freshmen-versus-sophomores football game of the season.

In the summer of 1918, Dow enlisted in the United States Navy Reserve and was stationed at the Harvard Radio School in Cambridge until the end of December. As World War I had ended in November, the Navy no longer required his service. Dow received an honorable discharge and returned to Storrs to resume his studies. In the spring of 1919, he helped manage the college basketball team.

Dow capped the school year on May 29 by attending the junior class prom with Miss Francis Bristol of Ansonia.

== Death ==
Dow made the Connecticut Aggies football varsity team in the fall of 1919. The season opener was an away game against New Hampshire State College (the future New Hampshire Wildcats) on Saturday, September 27, 1919. Dow had injured his ankle and was not expected to play, but he ended up traveling to Durham with his teammates and playing through his injury. The game took place in the afternoon, and New Hampshire took an early lead. Partway through the game's third quarter, tragedy struck. New Hampshire's right halfback, Earl Farmer, took possession and charged down the field. Connecticut Aggies right defensive end Eddie Voorhees tripped him, but Farmer regained his feet and continued down the field. Dow launched a high flying tackle, and both players went down with a crash. Farmer was uninjured, but Dow had been knocked unconscious when his head struck Farmer's knee. Witnesses described the blow as "entirely accidental."

Dow lay unconscious on the field while a physician was summoned. Dr. A. E. Grant had him moved from the field to the athletic director's office. After the game, Dow was moved again, this time to the Alpha Tau Omega fraternity house. He exhibited no visible signs of injury, and initially it was thought that he had been kneed in the solar plexis until the doctor eventually noticed a bump on his head. An ambulance was called to take him to Dover Hospital. Before the ambulance arrived, Dow died at 8 p.m. without regaining consciousness. His body was transported first to the hospital and then to Dow's family home in New Haven, where he was interred at Evergreen Cemetery on October 1. Dow's was the only death of the 1919 U.S. college football season.

Dow's death was attributed to traumatic brain injury, which contemporary accounts described as "concussion of the brain." Because his injury was not adjudged serious at first, the game had continued in Dow's absence. New Hampshire defeated Connecticut 13–0. The Aggies team voted to continue the season and finished 2–6, winning their final two games with Boston University and Rhode Island. It was the football team's only season under coach Roy J. Guyer, who went on to serve as basketball coach from 1922 to 1923 and as athletics director from 1919 to 1936.

Connecticut Agricultural College canceled all "light amusements" for three days following Dow's death. On the afternoon of October 1, 1919, at the same time Dow's funeral was taking place in New Haven, the college canceled classes, closed offices, and gathered the entire college community into the Willis Nichols Hawley Armory in Storrs. Fifteen minutes of silence were followed by a eulogy from President Charles L. Beach along with remarks from student leaders. On October 6, the faculty adopted a resolution eulogizing Dow and expressing sympathy to his family.

Dow's fellow students dedicated to him the 1919–1920 volume of The Nutmeg yearbook. Six members of his fraternity acted as pallbearers at the funeral in New Haven.

Connecticut Agricultural College's athletic association posthumously granted Dow a varsity jersey, which they sent to his family.

== Legacy ==
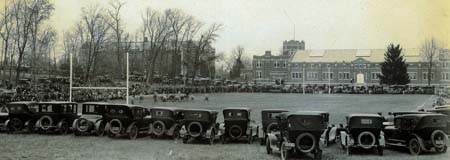
Gardner Dow Field in 1920

On October 6, Connecticut Agricultural College's athletic association named the college's athletic field the Gardner Dow Field. The field extended from the rear of Hawley Armory westward to what is now Hillside Road. The Gardner Dow Field served as the football team's home pitch until Memorial Stadium opened in 1953. It served as the home court for the college's baseball, soccer, field hockey, and track teams. It hosted tennis courts and other facilities, while archery matches, agricultural shows and fairs, and various student activities were held there. By the 1970s, the field had largely ceased to exist due to new construction, including the Homer Babbidge Library, the School of Business, and the Information Technology Engineering buildings.

A commemorative plaque was placed at the Gardner Dow Field. It was moved to an exterior wall of Hawley Armory in the 1950s, where it remained until it was moved inside the building.

In December of 2025, the plaque was moved for permanent display at the J. Robert Donnelly Husky Heritage Sports Museum at the UConn Alumni Center. The plaque was completely refinished before the move. On December 18, 2025, a rededication ceremony of the plaque was held inside the museum. In attendance were members of Dow's family, including his great grand nephew William Dow III.

== See also ==
- List of gridiron football players who died during their careers
