= 1919 Maine Black Bears football team =

American college football season

1919 Maine Black Bears football

MIAA champion
- Conference: Maine Intercollegiate Athletic Association
- Record: 6–1 (3–0 MIAA)
- Head coach: James A. Baldwin (1st season)
- Captain: Clyde Stewart
- Home stadium: Alumni Field

The 1919 Maine Black Bears football team was an American football team that represented the University of Maine during the 1919 college football season. In its first season under head coach James A. Baldwin, the team compiled a 6–1 record. Clyde Stewart was the team captain.

== Schedule ==
| Date | Opponent | Site | Result | Source |
|---|---|---|---|---|
| October 4 | Fort McKinley* | Alumni Field; Orono, ME | W 55–0 | |
| October 11 | Fort Williams* | Alumni Field; Orono, ME | W 82–0 | |
| October 18 | at Army* | The Plain; West Point, NY | L 0–6 | |
| October 25 | at Bates | Garcelon Field; Lewiston, ME | W 26–17 | |
| November 1 | at Colby | Seaverns Field; Waterville, ME | W 25–0 | |
| November 8 | Bowdoin | Alumni Field; Orono, ME | W 18–0 | |
| November 15 | at New Hampshire* | College Oval; Durham, NH (rivalry) | W 7–3 | |
*Non-conference game
