= Pete Reynolds =

American football player and coach (1885–1951)

Biographical details
- Born: September 14, 1885; Woodstock, New York, U.S.
- Died: December 26, 1951 (aged 66); Oneida, New York, U.S.

Playing career
- 1905–1907: Syracuse
- Position: End

Coaching career (HC unless noted)
- 1909–1913: Hobart
- 1914–1916: Hamilton
- 1917–1918: Syracuse (field coach)
- 1919–1923: Bucknell
- 1925–1926: Syracuse
- 1935–1937: Knox (IL)

Head coaching record
- Overall: 77–58–14

Charles William Peter Reynolds (September 14, 1885 – December 26, 1951) was an American college football player and coach. He served as the head football coach at Hobart College (1909–1913), Hamilton College (1914–1916), Bucknell University (1919–1923), Syracuse University (1925–1926), and Knox College in Galesburg, Illinois (1935–1937), compiling a career head coaching record of 77–58–14. Reynolds died at the age of 66 on December 26, 1951, in Oneida, New York.

== Head coaching record ==
| Year | Team | Overall | Conference | Standing | Bowl/playoffs |
|---|---|---|---|---|---|
Hobart (Independent) (1909–1913)
| 1909 | Hobart | 2–3–1 | | | |
| 1910 | Hobart | 4–1–1 | | | |
| 1911 | Hobart | 2–4 | | | |
| 1912 | Hobart | 4–4 | | | |
| 1913 | Hobart | 1–5–2 | | | |
| Hamilton: | | 13–17–4 | | | |
Hamilton Continentals (Independent) (1914–1916)
| 1914 | Hamilton | 3–4 | | | |
| 1915 | Hamilton | 5–1–2 | | | |
| 1916 | Hamilton | 3–4 | | | |
| Hamilton: | | 11–9–2 | | | |
Bucknell Bison (Independent) (1919–1923)
| 1919 | Bucknell | 5–4–1 | | | |
| 1920 | Bucknell | 6–3 | | | |
| 1921 | Bucknell | 5–3–1 | | | |
| 1922 | Bucknell | 7–4 | | | |
| 1923 | Bucknell | 4–4–1 | | | |
| Bucknell: | | 27–18–3 | | | |
Syracuse Orangemen (Independent) (1925–1926)
| 1925 | Syracuse | 8–1–1 | | | |
| 1926 | Syracuse | 7–2–1 | | | |
| Syracuse: | | 15–3–2 | | | |
Knox Old Siwash (Illinois Intercollegiate Athletic Conference / Midwest Conference) (1935–1937)
| 1935 | Knox | 5–2–2 | 2–1–1 / 2–2–1 | T–7th / T–5th | |
| 1936 | Knox | 3–5 | 1–2 / 2–3 | 16th / 6th | |
| 1937 | Knox | 3–4–1 | 2–1–1 / 0–3–1 | 8th / 9th | |
| Knox: | | 11–11–3 | 8–11–3 | | |
| Total: | | 77–58–14 | | | |
