= Joseph W. Brooks =

American football player and coach (1891–1953)

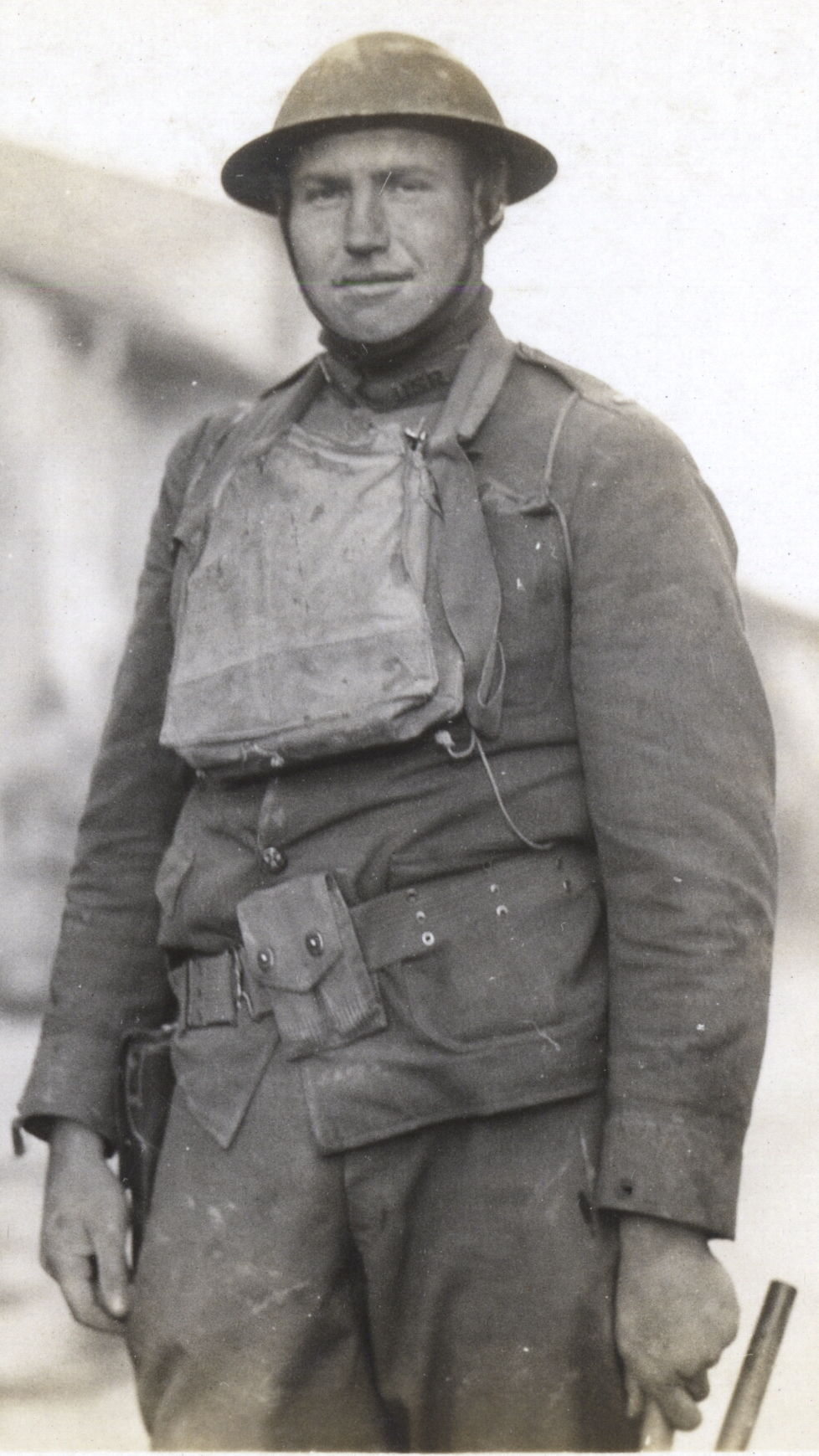
- Brooks in 1918

Biographical details
- Born: July 17, 1891; Denver, Colorado, U.S.
- Died: November 27, 1953 (aged 62); New York, New York, U.S.

Playing career
- 1909–1910: Williams
- 1912–1914: Colgate
- Position: Tackle

Coaching career (HC unless noted)
- 1915: Colgate (assistant)
- 1916: Williams
- 1919–1920: Williams
- 1921: Columbia (assistant)

Head coaching record
- Overall: 15–7–2
- Military career
- Branch: U.S. Army (1917–1918); Office of Strategic Services
- Unit: 42nd Division (1917–1918)
- Conflicts: World War I; Battle of Château-Thierry; Battle of Saint-Mihiel; World War II

Joseph W. Brooks (July 7, 1891 – November 27, 1953) was an American college football player and coach. He played for Williams College and Colgate University from 1909 to 1914. He was the head football coach at Williams College in 1916, 1919 and 1920. He served in the United States Army during World War I and in the Office of Strategic Services during World War II.

== Early life ==
Joseph W. Brooks was born to Belvedere Brooks. His family was from the southern United States and both of his grandfathers served in the Confederate Army during the Civil War.

Brooks played college football at the tackle position and place kicker for Williams College from 1909 to 1910 and for Colgate University from 1912 to 1914. He kicked four placement goals in a 1913 game against Syracuse University and was selected as an All-Eastern player. The New York Times called him "a great placement goal kicker" and "one of the greatest offensive tackles of the country."

== Coaching career and World War I ==
After graduating from Colgate in 1915, he remained there as an assistant football coach in the 1915. In 1916, he coached the Williams College football team.

In January 1917, Brooks was ruled ineligible to play amateur hockey for the Irish-American Athletic Club in the American Amateur Hockey League due to his having served as a coach at Williams College in 1916.

After the United States entered World War I in the spring of 1917, Brooks served in France with the United States Army as a captain with the 150th Machine Gun Battalion of the 42nd Division. He served in the Battles of Château-Thierry and Saint-Mihiel.

After being discharged from the military, Brooks returned to his position as the head football coach at Williams College. He was the head coach at Williams for the 1916, 1919 and 1920 seasons.

In December 1920, Brooks announced that he would spend the 1921 football season as an assistant football coach for Columbia University.

== Later career ==
In 1934, Brooks was on the national squash tennis doubles championship team. He was turned down for enlistment in the U.S. Air Force during World War II. He then served as a pilot in the Canadian Air Force navigator's school. He was commissioned as a lieutenant colonel under William J. Donovan's Office of Strategic Services and conducted secret missions in Europe.

Brooks was president of Brooks & Kupillas, an insurance broker on East 42nd Street in Manhattan.

== Personal life ==
On January 1, 1921, Brooks' brother, George Bruce Brooks (also a football player for Williams College), shot Julian Dick at a New Year's party in New York City. Brooks donated blood for a transfusion, but the shooting victim died.

In October 1931, Brooks survived an airplane crash in South Bend, Indiana, shortly after becoming engaged to Alicia Patterson. The couple was married two months later and the couple, both of whom were licensed pilots, flew to Florida and later to Mexico, in their own plane. They later divorced in 1939.

Brooks died of a self-inflicted gunshot wound to his right temple at his apartment on Park Avenue in Manhattan on November 27, 1953.

== Head coaching record ==
Year	Team	Overall	Conference	Standing	Bowl/playoffs
Williams Ephs (Independent) (1916)
1916	Williams	4–2–2			
Williams Ephs (Independent) (1919–1920)
1919	Williams	6–2			
1920	Williams	5–3			
Williams:		15–7–2			
Total:		15–7–2			
