= 1919 Massachusetts Aggies football team =

American college football season

1919 Massachusetts Aggies football
- Conference: Athletic League of New England State Colleges
- Record: 5–2–1 ( Athletic League of New England State Colleges)
- Head coach: Harold Gore (1st season)
- Home stadium: Alumni Field

The 1919 Massachusetts Aggies football team represented Massachusetts Agricultural College in the 1919 college football season. The team was coached by Harold Gore and played its home games at Alumni Field in Amherst, Massachusetts. The 1919 season was Gore's first as head coach of the Aggies and the team's first season since disbanding during World War I. Massachusetts finished the season with a record of 5–2–1.

== Schedule ==
Date	Opponent	Site	Result	Source
October 4	Connecticut	Alumni Field; Amherst, MA (rivalry)	W 15–7	
October 11	at Dartmouth	Alumni Oval; Hanover, NH	L 7–27	
October 18	Worcester Tech	Alumni Field; Amherst, MA	W 27–0	
October 25	Vermont	Alumni Field; Amherst, MA	W 25–0	
November 1	at New Hampshire	College Oval; Durham, NH (rivalry)	L 7–9	
November 8	at Rhode Island State	Kingston, RI	W 19–11	
November 15	at Springfield YMCA	Pratt Field; Springfield, MA	T 0–0	
November 22	Tufts	Alumni Field; Amherst, MA	W 14–0	
