= 1919 Connecticut Aggies football team =

American college football season

1919 Connecticut Aggies football
- Conference: Athletic League of New England State Colleges
- Record: 2–6 (1–2 New England)
- Head coach: Roy J. Guyer (1st season)
- Home stadium: Gardner Dow Athletic Fields

The 1919 Connecticut Aggies football team represented Connecticut Agricultural College, now the University of Connecticut, in the 1919 college football season. The Aggies were led by first-year head coach Roy J. Guyer, and completed the season with a record of 2–6. There was no team in 1917 or 1918 due to World War I. After the first game against New Hampshire, Aggie junior Gardner Dow died of injuries from a tackle he delivered in the fourth quarter. The school would name the Athletic Fields on which many sports competed for him.

== Schedule ==
Date	Opponent	Site	Result	Source
September 27	at New Hampshire	Durham, NH	L 0–13	
October 4	at Massachusetts	Alumni Field; Amherst, MA (rivalry)	L 7–15	
October 11	at Trinity (CT)*	Trinity Field; Hartford, CT	L 0–6	
October 18	at Stevens*	Hoboken, NJ	L 0–35	
October 25	at Holy Cross*	Fitton Field; Worcester, MA	L 0–69	
November 1	New York Aggies*	Gardner Dow Athletic Fields; Storrs, CT	L 7–33	
November 8	Boston University*	Gardner Dow Athletic Fields; Storrs, CT	W 7–0	
November 22	at Rhode Island State	Kingston, RI (rivalry)	W 7–3	
*Non-conference game
