= 1919 Penn Quakers football team =

American college football season

1919 Penn Quakers football
- Conference: Independent
- Record: 6–2–1
- Head coach: Bob Folwell (4th season)
- Captain: Bert Bell
- Home stadium: Franklin Field

1919 Eastern college football independents records
	Conf.			Overall
Team	W	L	T	W		L		T
Harvard		–		9	–	0	–	1
Penn State		–		7	–	1	–	0
Swarthmore		–		7	–	1	–	0
Dartmouth		–		6	–	1	–	1
Colgate		–		5	–	1	–	1
New Hampshire		–		7	–	2	–	0
Lafayette		–		6	–	2	–	0
Washington & Jefferson		–		6	–	2	–	0
Williams		–		6	–	2	–	0
Syracuse		–		8	–	3	–	0
Penn		–		6	–	2	–	1
Pittsburgh		–		6	–	2	–	1
Lehigh		–		6	–	3	–	0
Princeton		–		4	–	2	–	1
Geneva		–		4	–	2	–	2
Army		–		6	–	3	–	0
Boston College		–		5	–	3	–	0
Holy Cross		–		5	–	3	–	0
Rutgers		–		5	–	3	–	0
Yale		–		5	–	3	–	0
Villanova		–		5	–	3	–	1
Brown		–		5	–	4	–	1
Bucknell		–		5	–	4	–	1
NYU		–		4	–	4	–	0
Carnegie Tech		–		3	–	4	–	0
Columbia		–		2	–	4	–	3
Cornell		–		3	–	5	–	0
Vermont		–		3	–	6	–	0
Franklin & Marshall		–		2	–	4	–	2
Tufts		–		2	–	5	–	0
Buffalo		–		0	–	5	–	1
Rhode Island State		–		0	–	8	–	1
Drexel		–		0	–	4	–	0

The 1919 Penn Quakers football team was an American football team that represented the University of Pennsylvania as an independent during the 1919 college football season. In their fourth season under head coach Bob Folwell, the Quakers compiled a 6–2–1 record, shut out five of nine opponents, and outscored all opponents by a total of 283 to 40. The team played its home games at Franklin Field in Philadelphia.

Bert Bell, who later served as commissioner of the National Football League, was the team captain. End Heinie Miller was selected by Walter Camp as a first-team All-American.

== Schedule ==
Date	Opponent	Site	Result	Attendance	Source
September 27	Bucknell	Franklin Field; Philadelphia, PA	W 16–0		
October 4	Pennsylvania Military	Franklin Field; Philadelphia, PA	W 54–0		
October 11	Delaware	Franklin Field; Philadelphia, PA	W 89–0		
October 18	Swarthmore	Franklin Field; Philadelphia, PA	W 55–7		
October 25	Lafayette	Franklin Field; Philadelphia, PA	W 23–0		
November 1	Penn State	Franklin Field; Philadelphia, PA	L 0–10	20,000	
November 8	vs. Dartmouth	Polo Grounds; New York, NY	L 19–20		
November 15	Pittsburgh	Franklin Field; Philadelphia, PA	T 3–3	30,000	
November 27	Cornell	Franklin Field; Philadelphia, PA (rivalry)	W 24–0	25,000	
