= 1919 NYU Violets football team =

American college football season

1919 NYU Violets football
- Conference: Independent
- Record: 4–4
- Head coach: John B. Longwell (1st season)
- Home stadium: Ohio Field

1919 Eastern college football independents records
	Conf.			Overall
Team	W	L	T	W		L		T
Harvard		–		9	–	0	–	1
Penn State		–		7	–	1	–	0
Swarthmore		–		7	–	1	–	0
Dartmouth		–		6	–	1	–	1
Colgate		–		5	–	1	–	1
New Hampshire		–		7	–	2	–	0
Lafayette		–		6	–	2	–	0
Washington & Jefferson		–		6	–	2	–	0
Williams		–		6	–	2	–	0
Syracuse		–		8	–	3	–	0
Penn		–		6	–	2	–	1
Pittsburgh		–		6	–	2	–	1
Lehigh		–		6	–	3	–	0
Princeton		–		4	–	2	–	1
Geneva		–		4	–	2	–	2
Army		–		6	–	3	–	0
Boston College		–		5	–	3	–	0
Holy Cross		–		5	–	3	–	0
Rutgers		–		5	–	3	–	0
Yale		–		5	–	3	–	0
Villanova		–		5	–	3	–	1
Brown		–		5	–	4	–	1
Bucknell		–		5	–	4	–	1
NYU		–		4	–	4	–	0
Carnegie Tech		–		3	–	4	–	0
Columbia		–		2	–	4	–	3
Cornell		–		3	–	5	–	0
Vermont		–		3	–	6	–	0
Franklin & Marshall		–		2	–	4	–	2
Tufts		–		2	–	5	–	0
Buffalo		–		0	–	5	–	1
Rhode Island State		–		0	–	8	–	1
Drexel		–		0	–	4	–	0

The 1919 NYU Violets football team was an American football team that represented New York University as an independent during the 1919 college football season. In their only year under head coach John B. Longwell, the team compiled a 4–4 record.

== Schedule ==
Date	Opponent	Site	Result	Attendance	Source
October 4	at Amherst	Pratt Field; Amherst, MA	L 0–2		
October 11	at Hamilton	Clinton, NY	L 0–9		
October 18	Wesleyan	Ohio Field; Bronx, NY	L 0–10		
October 25	RPI	Ohio Field; Bronx, NY	W 9–0		
November 4	Trinity (CT)	Ohio Field; Bronx, NY	W 39–0		
November 8	at Union (NY)	Alexander Field; Schenectady, NY	W 17–6		
November 15	Stevens	Ohio Field; Bronx, NY	L 3–24		
November 22	at Columbia	South Field; New York, NY	W 27–12	10,000	
