= John H. Rush =

American football player and coach (1874–1958)

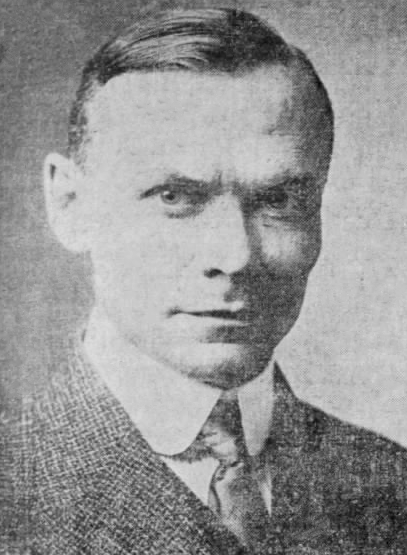
- Rush pictured in The Boston Globe, 1915

Biographical details
- Born: 1874; Waterloo, Iowa, U.S.
- Died: August 31, 1958 (aged 84); Garden City, New York, U.S.

Playing career

Football
- c. 1896: Grinnell
- Position: Halfback

Coaching career (HC unless noted)

Football
- c. 1900–1914: University School (OH)
- 1915–1916: Princeton
- 1919: Cornell

Head coaching record
- Overall: 15–9 (college)

John Harland "Speedy" Rush (1874 – August 31, 1958) was an American football player and coach and track athlete. He served as the head football coach at Princeton University from 1915 to 1916 and at Cornell University in 1919, compiling career college football record of 15–9. Rush was born in Waterloo, Iowa. He played football at Grinell College as a halfback before entering Princeton in 1897. At Princeton Rush ran track, worked as a newspaper correspondent, and attended football practice. Rush graduated from Princeton in 1898 and relocated to Cleveland, Ohio, where he coached football and a number of other sports at University School, a private preparatory school. Rush died at the age of 84, on August 31, 1958, at his daughter's home in Garden City, New York.

== Head coaching record ==
=== College ===
Year	Team	Overall	Conference	Standing	Bowl/playoffs
Princeton Tigers (Independent) (1915–1916)
1915	Princeton	6–2			
1916	Princeton	6–2			
Princeton:		12–4			
Cornell Big Red (Independent) (1919)
1919	Cornell	3–5			
Cornell:		3–5			
Total:		15–9			
