= 1919 Lafayette football team =

American football club

1919 Lafayette football
- Conference: Independent
- Record: 6–2
- Head coach: Jock Sutherland (1st season)
- Captain: John "Bodie" Weldon
- Home stadium: March Field

1919 Eastern college football independents records
	Conf.			Overall
Team	W	L	T	W		L		T
Harvard		–		9	–	0	–	1
Penn State		–		7	–	1	–	0
Swarthmore		–		7	–	1	–	0
Dartmouth		–		6	–	1	–	1
Colgate		–		5	–	1	–	1
New Hampshire		–		7	–	2	–	0
Lafayette		–		6	–	2	–	0
Washington & Jefferson		–		6	–	2	–	0
Williams		–		6	–	2	–	0
Syracuse		–		8	–	3	–	0
Penn		–		6	–	2	–	1
Pittsburgh		–		6	–	2	–	1
Lehigh		–		6	–	3	–	0
Princeton		–		4	–	2	–	1
Geneva		–		4	–	2	–	2
Army		–		6	–	3	–	0
Boston College		–		5	–	3	–	0
Holy Cross		–		5	–	3	–	0
Rutgers		–		5	–	3	–	0
Yale		–		5	–	3	–	0
Villanova		–		5	–	3	–	1
Brown		–		5	–	4	–	1
Bucknell		–		5	–	4	–	1
NYU		–		4	–	4	–	0
Carnegie Tech		–		3	–	4	–	0
Columbia		–		2	–	4	–	3
Cornell		–		3	–	5	–	0
Vermont		–		3	–	6	–	0
Franklin & Marshall		–		2	–	4	–	2
Tufts		–		2	–	5	–	0
Buffalo		–		0	–	5	–	1
Rhode Island State		–		0	–	8	–	1
Drexel		–		0	–	4	–	0

The 1919 Lafayette football team was an American football team that represented Lafayette College as an independent during the 1919 college football season. In its first season under head coach Jock Sutherland, the team compiled a 6–2 record. John "Bodie" Weldon was the team captain. The team played its home games at March Field in Easton, Pennsylvania.

== Schedule ==
Date	Opponent	Site	Result
October 4	Muhlenberg	March Field; Easton, PA	W 13–0
October 11	at Princeton	Palmer Stadium; Princeton, NJ	L 6–9
October 18	Haverford	March Field; Easton, PA	W 41–0
October 25	at Penn	Franklin Field; Philadelphia, PA	L 0–23
November 1	at Cornell	Schoellkopf Field; Ithaca, NY	W 21–2
November 8	Dickinson	March Field; Easton, PA	W 48–0
November 15	Trinity (CT)	March Field; Easton, PA	W 35–0
November 22	at Lehigh	Taylor Stadium; Bethlehem, PA (rivalry)	W 10–6
