= 1919 Geneva Covenanters football team =

American college football season

1919 Geneva Covenanters football
- Conference: Independent
- Record: 4–2–2
- Head coach: Philip Henry Bridenbaugh (3rd season)
- Captain: Walter Smith

1919 Eastern college football independents records
	Conf.			Overall
Team	W	L	T	W		L		T
Harvard		–		9	–	0	–	1
Penn State		–		7	–	1	–	0
Swarthmore		–		7	–	1	–	0
Dartmouth		–		6	–	1	–	1
Colgate		–		5	–	1	–	1
New Hampshire		–		7	–	2	–	0
Lafayette		–		6	–	2	–	0
Washington & Jefferson		–		6	–	2	–	0
Williams		–		6	–	2	–	0
Syracuse		–		8	–	3	–	0
Penn		–		6	–	2	–	1
Pittsburgh		–		6	–	2	–	1
Lehigh		–		6	–	3	–	0
Princeton		–		4	–	2	–	1
Geneva		–		4	–	2	–	2
Army		–		6	–	3	–	0
Boston College		–		5	–	3	–	0
Holy Cross		–		5	–	3	–	0
Rutgers		–		5	–	3	–	0
Yale		–		5	–	3	–	0
Villanova		–		5	–	3	–	1
Brown		–		5	–	4	–	1
Bucknell		–		5	–	4	–	1
NYU		–		4	–	4	–	0
Carnegie Tech		–		3	–	4	–	0
Columbia		–		2	–	4	–	3
Cornell		–		3	–	5	–	0
Vermont		–		3	–	6	–	0
Franklin & Marshall		–		2	–	4	–	2
Tufts		–		2	–	5	–	0
Buffalo		–		0	–	5	–	1
Rhode Island State		–		0	–	8	–	1
Drexel		–		0	–	4	–	0

The 1919 Geneva Covenanters football team was an American football team that represented Geneva College as an independent during the 1919 college football season. Led by third-year head coach Philip Henry Bridenbaugh, the team compiled a record of 4–2–2.

== Schedule ==
Date	Opponent	Site	Result	Attendance	Source
October 4	Pittsburgh	Beaver Falls, PA	L 2–33	4,000	
October 11	Thiel	Beaver Falls, PA	W 13–0		
October 21	at Muskingum	New Concord, OH	W 2–0		
October 25	at Hiram	Hiram, OH	W 18–0		
November 1	Westminster (PA)	Beaver Falls, PA	T 0–0		
November 8	at Allegheny	Meadville, PA	W 3–0		
November 15	Grove City	Beaver Falls, PA	T 6–6		
November 22	Bethany (WV)	Beaver Falls, PA	L 7–14		
