= 1919 Harvard Crimson football team =

American college football season

1919 Harvard Crimson football
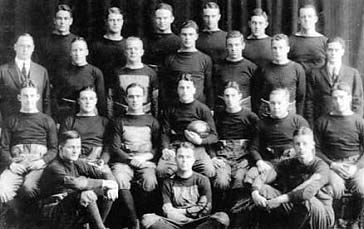

National champion (Helms, Houlgate) Co-national champion (CFRA, NCF, Davis) Rose Bowl champion

Rose Bowl, W 7–6 vs. Oregon
- Conference: Independent
- Record: 9–0–1
- Head coach: Bob Fisher (1st season)
- Captain: Billy Murray
- Home stadium: Harvard Stadium

1919 Eastern college football independents records
	Conf.			Overall
Team	W	L	T	W		L		T
Harvard		–		9	–	0	–	1
Penn State		–		7	–	1	–	0
Swarthmore		–		7	–	1	–	0
Dartmouth		–		6	–	1	–	1
Colgate		–		5	–	1	–	1
New Hampshire		–		7	–	2	–	0
Lafayette		–		6	–	2	–	0
Washington & Jefferson		–		6	–	2	–	0
Williams		–		6	–	2	–	0
Syracuse		–		8	–	3	–	0
Penn		–		6	–	2	–	1
Pittsburgh		–		6	–	2	–	1
Lehigh		–		6	–	3	–	0
Princeton		–		4	–	2	–	1
Geneva		–		4	–	2	–	2
Army		–		6	–	3	–	0
Boston College		–		5	–	3	–	0
Holy Cross		–		5	–	3	–	0
Rutgers		–		5	–	3	–	0
Yale		–		5	–	3	–	0
Villanova		–		5	–	3	–	1
Brown		–		5	–	4	–	1
Bucknell		–		5	–	4	–	1
NYU		–		4	–	4	–	0
Carnegie Tech		–		3	–	4	–	0
Columbia		–		2	–	4	–	3
Cornell		–		3	–	5	–	0
Vermont		–		3	–	6	–	0
Franklin & Marshall		–		2	–	4	–	2
Tufts		–		2	–	5	–	0
Buffalo		–		0	–	5	–	1
Rhode Island State		–		0	–	8	–	1
Drexel		–		0	–	4	–	0

The 1919 Harvard Crimson football team was an American football team that represented Harvard University as an independent during the 1919 college football season. In their first season under head coach Bob Fisher, the Crimson compiled a 9–0–1 record, shut out seven of ten opponents, and outscored all opponents by a total of 229 to 19. The team was invited to play in the 1920 Rose Bowl and defeated Oregon, 7–6.

== Schedule ==
Date	Time	Opponent	Site	Result	Attendance	Source
September 27	3:00 p.m.	Bates	Harvard Stadium; Boston, MA	W 53–0	7,000	
October 4	3:00 p.m.	Boston College	Harvard Stadium; Boston, MA	W 17–0	16,000	
October 11	3:00 p.m.	Colby	Harvard Stadium; Boston, MA	W 35–0	10,000	
October 18	3:00 p.m.	Brown	Harvard Stadium; Boston, MA	W 7–0	23,000	
October 25	3:00 p.m.	Virginia	Harvard Stadium; Boston, MA	W 47–0		
November 1		Springfield YMCA	Harvard Stadium; Boston, MA	W 20–0		
November 8	2:00 p.m.	at Princeton	Palmer Stadium; Princeton, NJ (rivalry)	T 10–10	15,000	
November 15		Tufts	Harvard Stadium; Boston, MA	W 23–0		
November 22		Yale	Harvard Stadium; Boston, MA (rivalry)	W 10–3	> 50,000	
January 1, 1920	2:30 p.m.	vs. Oregon	Tournament Park; Pasadena, CA (Rose Bowl)	W 7–6	32,000–35,000	
All times are in Eastern time; Source:

== Claim to national championship ==
There was no contemporaneous system in 1919 for determining a national champion. However, Harvard was retroactively named as the national champion by the Helms Athletic Foundation and the Houlgate System, and as a co-national champion by the College Football Researchers Association, National Championship Foundation, and Parke H. Davis. Illinois (6–1 record), Notre Dame (9–0 record), and Texas A&M (10–0 record) were chosen as the 1919 national champion or co-champion by some selectors.

== Key players ==
Harvard halfback Eddie Casey was selected as consensus first-team player on the 1919 All-America team. Casey was later inducted into the College Football Hall of Fame.

Other notable players on the 1919 team included backs Arnold Horween and Frederic Cameron Church Jr. and linemen Tom Woods, Charles Arthur "Tubby" Clark and Robert "Duke" Sedgwick. Quarterback Billy Murray was the team captain.

== "High-water mark" in Harvard football history ==
The 1919 season was a transition year for Harvard football. Percy Haughton was the head coach from 1908 to 1916, leading the program to a record of 97–17–6. Varsity football was discontinued during the war years of 1917 and 1918, though the school did field an "informal" team. The 1919 season marked the return of varsity football under a new head coach. Coach Fisher compiled a 43–14–5 record in seven seasons as head coach and was later inducted into the College Football Hall of Fame. Harvard's victory in the 1920 Rose Bowl has been called "the high-water mark" in program history, as athletics were deemphasized in the 1920s and thereafter.

== Roster ==
- Brown, G
- Eddie Casey, HB
- W. Caswell, C
- Frederic Cameron Church Jr., FB
- Charles Arthur Clark, G
- Desmond, E
- Faxon, E
- Felton, QB
- Mitchell Gratwick, HB
- Hadley, G
- Hamilton, HB
- Charles Frederick Havemeyer, C
- Holmes, G
- Arnold Horween, FB
- Hubbard, E
- R. S. Humphrey, QB
- Richmond Keith Kane, T
- McCagg, T
- Billy Murray, QB
- Nils V. "Swede" Nelson, HB
- Olmstead, G
- Philip J. Philbin, C
- Morris Phinney, E
- Ryan, E
- Salter, T
- Bob Sedgwick, T
- Augustus Thorndike, G
- Weatherhead, E
- Tom Woods, G
