= 1919 Swarthmore Quakers football team =

American college football season

1919 Swarthmore Quakers football
- Conference: Independent
- Record: 7–1
- Head coach: Leroy Mercer (3rd season)

1919 Eastern college football independents records
	Conf.			Overall
Team	W	L	T	W		L		T
Harvard		–		9	–	0	–	1
Penn State		–		7	–	1	–	0
Swarthmore		–		7	–	1	–	0
Dartmouth		–		6	–	1	–	1
Colgate		–		5	–	1	–	1
New Hampshire		–		7	–	2	–	0
Lafayette		–		6	–	2	–	0
Washington & Jefferson		–		6	–	2	–	0
Williams		–		6	–	2	–	0
Syracuse		–		8	–	3	–	0
Penn		–		6	–	2	–	1
Pittsburgh		–		6	–	2	–	1
Lehigh		–		6	–	3	–	0
Princeton		–		4	–	2	–	1
Geneva		–		4	–	2	–	2
Army		–		6	–	3	–	0
Boston College		–		5	–	3	–	0
Holy Cross		–		5	–	3	–	0
Rutgers		–		5	–	3	–	0
Yale		–		5	–	3	–	0
Villanova		–		5	–	3	–	1
Brown		–		5	–	4	–	1
Bucknell		–		5	–	4	–	1
NYU		–		4	–	4	–	0
Carnegie Tech		–		3	–	4	–	0
Columbia		–		2	–	4	–	3
Cornell		–		3	–	5	–	0
Vermont		–		3	–	6	–	0
Franklin & Marshall		–		2	–	4	–	2
Tufts		–		2	–	5	–	0
Buffalo		–		0	–	5	–	1
Rhode Island State		–		0	–	8	–	1
Drexel		–		0	–	4	–	0

The 1919 Swarthmore Quakers football team was an American football team that represented Swarthmore College as an independent during the 1919 college football season. The team compiled a 7–1 record and outscored opponents by a total of 145 to 79. Leroy Mercer was the head coach.

== Schedule ==
Date	Opponent	Site	Result	Attendance	Source
October 4	Maryland State	Swarthmore, PA	W 10–6		
October 11	at Pennsylvania Military	Chester, PA	W 14–0		
October 18	at Penn	Franklin Field; Philadelphia, PA	L 7–55		
October 25	Johns Hopkins	Swarthmore, PA	W 20–6		
November 1	Ursinus	Swarthmore, PA	W 13–12		
November 8	at Franklin & Marshall	Lancaster, PA	W 20–0		
November 15	at Delaware	Frazier Field; Newark, DE	W 17–0	3,000	
November 22	Haverford	Swarthmore, PA (rivalry)	W 44–0		
