= 1919 Colgate football team =

American college football season

1919 Colgate football
- Conference: Independent
- Record: 5–1–1
- Head coach: Ellery Huntington Jr. (1st season)
- Captain: Belford West
- Home stadium: Whitnall Field

1919 Eastern college football independents records
	Conf.			Overall
Team	W	L	T	W		L		T
Harvard		–		9	–	0	–	1
Penn State		–		7	–	1	–	0
Swarthmore		–		7	–	1	–	0
Dartmouth		–		6	–	1	–	1
Colgate		–		5	–	1	–	1
New Hampshire		–		7	–	2	–	0
Lafayette		–		6	–	2	–	0
Washington & Jefferson		–		6	–	2	–	0
Williams		–		6	–	2	–	0
Syracuse		–		8	–	3	–	0
Penn		–		6	–	2	–	1
Pittsburgh		–		6	–	2	–	1
Lehigh		–		6	–	3	–	0
Princeton		–		4	–	2	–	1
Geneva		–		4	–	2	–	2
Army		–		6	–	3	–	0
Boston College		–		5	–	3	–	0
Holy Cross		–		5	–	3	–	0
Rutgers		–		5	–	3	–	0
Yale		–		5	–	3	–	0
Villanova		–		5	–	3	–	1
Brown		–		5	–	4	–	1
Bucknell		–		5	–	4	–	1
NYU		–		4	–	4	–	0
Carnegie Tech		–		3	–	4	–	0
Columbia		–		2	–	4	–	3
Cornell		–		3	–	5	–	0
Vermont		–		3	–	6	–	0
Franklin & Marshall		–		2	–	4	–	2
Tufts		–		2	–	5	–	0
Buffalo		–		0	–	5	–	1
Rhode Island State		–		0	–	8	–	1
Drexel		–		0	–	4	–	0

The 1919 Colgate football team was an American football team that represented Colgate University as an independent during the 1919 college football season. In its first season under head coach Ellery Huntington Jr., the team compiled a 5–1–1 record and outscored opponents by a total of 111 to 27. Belford West was the team captain. The team played its home games on Whitnall Field in Hamilton, New York.

== Schedule ==
Date	Opponent	Site	Result	Attendance	Source
October 4	Susquehanna	Whitnall Field; Hamilton, NY	W 34–7		
October 11	Brown	Whitnall Field; Hamilton, NY	W 14–0	5,000	
October 18	at Cornell	Schoellkopf Field; Ithaca, NY (rivalry)	W 21–0		
October 25	at Princeton	Palmer Stadium; Princeton, NJ	W 7–0	15,000	
November 1	at Dartmouth	Alumni Oval; Hanover, NH	T 7–7		
November 8	Rochester	Whitnall Field; Hamilton, NY	W 21–0		
November 15	at Syracuse	Archbold Stadium; Syracuse, NY (rivalry)	L 7–13	30,000	
