= 1919 Washington & Jefferson Presidents football team =

American college football season

1919 Washington & Jefferson Presidents football
- Conference: Independent
- Record: 6–2
- Head coach: David C. Morrow (5th season)

1919 Eastern college football independents records
	Conf.			Overall
Team	W	L	T	W		L		T
Harvard		–		9	–	0	–	1
Penn State		–		7	–	1	–	0
Swarthmore		–		7	–	1	–	0
Dartmouth		–		6	–	1	–	1
Colgate		–		5	–	1	–	1
New Hampshire		–		7	–	2	–	0
Lafayette		–		6	–	2	–	0
Washington & Jefferson		–		6	–	2	–	0
Williams		–		6	–	2	–	0
Syracuse		–		8	–	3	–	0
Penn		–		6	–	2	–	1
Pittsburgh		–		6	–	2	–	1
Lehigh		–		6	–	3	–	0
Princeton		–		4	–	2	–	1
Geneva		–		4	–	2	–	2
Army		–		6	–	3	–	0
Boston College		–		5	–	3	–	0
Holy Cross		–		5	–	3	–	0
Rutgers		–		5	–	3	–	0
Yale		–		5	–	3	–	0
Villanova		–		5	–	3	–	1
Brown		–		5	–	4	–	1
Bucknell		–		5	–	4	–	1
NYU		–		4	–	4	–	0
Carnegie Tech		–		3	–	4	–	0
Columbia		–		2	–	4	–	3
Cornell		–		3	–	5	–	0
Vermont		–		3	–	6	–	0
Franklin & Marshall		–		2	–	4	–	2
Tufts		–		2	–	5	–	0
Buffalo		–		0	–	5	–	1
Rhode Island State		–		0	–	8	–	1
Drexel		–		0	–	4	–	0

The 1919 Washington & Jefferson Presidents football team was an American football team that represented Washington & Jefferson College as an independent during the 1919 college football season. David C. Morrow returned for his fifth season a head coach, having helmed the team from 1908 to 1911. Washington & Jefferson compiled a record of 6–2 and outscored opponents by a total of 125 to 14.

== Schedule ==
Date	Time	Opponent	Site	Result	Attendance	Source
October 4		The Kiski School	Washington, PA	W 23–0		
October 11		Carnegie Tech	Washington, PA	W 20–0		
October 18		Westminster (PA)	Washington, PA	W 16–0		
October 25		at Syracuse	Archbold Stadium; Syracuse, NY	W 13–0	8,500	
November 8	2:30 p.m	at Pittsburgh	Forbes Field; Pittsburgh, PA	L 6–7	30,150	
November 15		vs. Bethany (WV)	Wheeling, WV	W 14–0		
November 22		West Virginia Wesleyan	Washington, PA	W 33–0		
November 27		at West Virginia	WVU Athletic Field; Morgantown, WV	L 0–7		
All times are in Eastern time
