= E. Dewey Graham =

American athlete and coach (1898–1967)

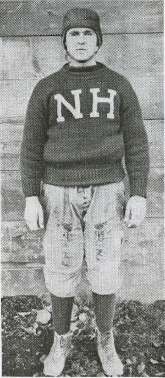
- Graham c. 1919, from the annual college yearbook of New Hampshire College

Biographical details
- Born: May 18, 1898; Kittery, Maine, U.S.
- Died: December 5, 1967 (aged 69); Providence, Rhode Island, U.S

Playing career

Football
- 1916–1920: New Hampshire

Coaching career (HC unless noted)

Football
- 1921: New Hampshire (freshmen/line)
- 1922–1925: Montpelier HS (VT)
- 1926–1930: Norwich

Baseball
- 1926–1931: Norwich

Edward Dewey Graham (May 18, 1898 – December 5, 1967) was an American college football and baseball player and coach. He served as the head football coach at Norwich University from 1926 to 1930.

Graham attended Portsmouth High School in Portsmouth, New Hampshire, where he was team captain in 1914. He then played college football for New Hampshire College of Agriculture and the Mechanic Arts (which became the University of New Hampshire in 1923) where he was captain of the 1919 team. He earned a Bachelor of Science degree from New Hampshire in 1922.

Graham served in the United States Navy from 1917 to 1919. He made an inter-service transfer to the United States Army in 1922, where served first in costal artillery and later in field artillery. He was commander of costal defense in the Netherlands Antilles Command from 1940 to 1945, and retired from active service with the rank of colonel.

Graham died on December 5, 1967, in Providence, Rhode Island.
