= 1919 Villanova Wildcats football team =

American college football season

1919 Villanova Wildcats football
- Conference: Independent
- Record: 5–3–1
- Head coach: Thomas Reap (3rd season)
- Captain: Hugh McGeehan
- Home stadium: None

1919 Eastern college football independents records
	Conf.			Overall
Team	W	L	T	W		L		T
Harvard		–		9	–	0	–	1
Penn State		–		7	–	1	–	0
Swarthmore		–		7	–	1	–	0
Dartmouth		–		6	–	1	–	1
Colgate		–		5	–	1	–	1
New Hampshire		–		7	–	2	–	0
Lafayette		–		6	–	2	–	0
Washington & Jefferson		–		6	–	2	–	0
Williams		–		6	–	2	–	0
Syracuse		–		8	–	3	–	0
Penn		–		6	–	2	–	1
Pittsburgh		–		6	–	2	–	1
Lehigh		–		6	–	3	–	0
Princeton		–		4	–	2	–	1
Geneva		–		4	–	2	–	2
Army		–		6	–	3	–	0
Boston College		–		5	–	3	–	0
Holy Cross		–		5	–	3	–	0
Rutgers		–		5	–	3	–	0
Yale		–		5	–	3	–	0
Villanova		–		5	–	3	–	1
Brown		–		5	–	4	–	1
Bucknell		–		5	–	4	–	1
NYU		–		4	–	4	–	0
Carnegie Tech		–		3	–	4	–	0
Columbia		–		2	–	4	–	3
Cornell		–		3	–	5	–	0
Vermont		–		3	–	6	–	0
Franklin & Marshall		–		2	–	4	–	2
Tufts		–		2	–	5	–	0
Buffalo		–		0	–	5	–	1
Rhode Island State		–		0	–	8	–	1
Drexel		–		0	–	4	–	0

The 1919 Villanova Wildcats football team represented the Villanova University during the 1919 college football season. The Wildcats team captain was Hugh McGeehan.

== Schedule ==
Date	Opponent	Site	Result
September 27	at Lehigh	Bethlehem, PA	L 0–47
October 4	at Lebanon Valley	Lebanon, PA	T 0–0
October 25	at Susquehanna	Shamokin, PA	W 19–0
November 1	Muhlenberg	Villanova, PA	W 6–0
November 8	at Gettysburg	Gettysburg, PA	L 0–20
November 11	Saint Joseph's	Villanova, PA	W 33–0
November 15	at Army	The Plain; West Point, NY	L 0–62
November 22	at Catholic University	Washington, DC	W 20–13
	at SUNY-Farmingdale	Farmingdale, NY	W 7–0
