= 1919 Boston College football team =

American college football season

1919 Boston College football
- Conference: Independent
- Record: 5–3
- Head coach: Frank Cavanaugh (1st season)
- Captain: James Fitzpatrick
- Home stadium: Alumni Field, Fenway Park, Braves Field

1919 Eastern college football independents records
| | Conf. | | | Overall |
| Team | W | L | T | W | | L | | T |
|---|---|---|---|---|---|---|---|---|
| Harvard | | – | | 9 | – | 0 | – | 1 |
| Penn State | | – | | 7 | – | 1 | – | 0 |
| Swarthmore | | – | | 7 | – | 1 | – | 0 |
| Dartmouth | | – | | 6 | – | 1 | – | 1 |
| Colgate | | – | | 5 | – | 1 | – | 1 |
| New Hampshire | | – | | 7 | – | 2 | – | 0 |
| Lafayette | | – | | 6 | – | 2 | – | 0 |
| Washington & Jefferson | | – | | 6 | – | 2 | – | 0 |
| Williams | | – | | 6 | – | 2 | – | 0 |
| Syracuse | | – | | 8 | – | 3 | – | 0 |
| Penn | | – | | 6 | – | 2 | – | 1 |
| Pittsburgh | | – | | 6 | – | 2 | – | 1 |
| Lehigh | | – | | 6 | – | 3 | – | 0 |
| Princeton | | – | | 4 | – | 2 | – | 1 |
| Geneva | | – | | 4 | – | 2 | – | 2 |
| Army | | – | | 6 | – | 3 | – | 0 |
| Boston College | | – | | 5 | – | 3 | – | 0 |
| Holy Cross | | – | | 5 | – | 3 | – | 0 |
| Rutgers | | – | | 5 | – | 3 | – | 0 |
| Yale | | – | | 5 | – | 3 | – | 0 |
| Villanova | | – | | 5 | – | 3 | – | 1 |
| Brown | | – | | 5 | – | 4 | – | 1 |
| Bucknell | | – | | 5 | – | 4 | – | 1 |
| NYU | | – | | 4 | – | 4 | – | 0 |
| Carnegie Tech | | – | | 3 | – | 4 | – | 0 |
| Columbia | | – | | 2 | – | 4 | – | 3 |
| Cornell | | – | | 3 | – | 5 | – | 0 |
| Vermont | | – | | 3 | – | 6 | – | 0 |
| Franklin & Marshall | | – | | 2 | – | 4 | – | 2 |
| Tufts | | – | | 2 | – | 5 | – | 0 |
| Buffalo | | – | | 0 | – | 5 | – | 1 |
| Rhode Island State | | – | | 0 | – | 8 | – | 1 |
| Drexel | | – | | 0 | – | 4 | – | 0 |

The 1919 Boston College football team represented Boston College an independent during the 1919 college football season. Led by first-year head coach Frank Cavanaugh, Boston College compiled a record of 5–3.

== Schedule ==
| Date | Time | Opponent | Site | Result | Attendance | Source |
|---|---|---|---|---|---|---|
| September 27 | | USS Utah | Alumni Field; Chestnut Hill, MA | W 22–0 | | |
| October 4 | 3:00 p.m. | at Harvard | Harvard Stadium; Boston, MA | L 0–17 | 16,000 | |
| October 11 | 3:00 p.m. | Middlebury | Alumni Field; Chestnut Hill, MA | W 25–0 | | |
| October 18 | | at Yale | Yale Bowl; New Haven, CT | W 5–3 | | |
| October 25 | | at Army | The Plain; West Point, NY | L 0–13 | | |
| November 8 | 2:00 p.m. | Rutgers | Fenway Park; Boston, MA | L 7–13 | | |
| November 15 | 2:00 p.m. | Holy Cross | Fenway Park; Boston, MA (rivalry) | W 9–7 | | |
| November 29 | 2:00 p.m. | Georgetown | Braves Field; Boston, MA | W 10–9 | | |
All times are in Eastern time
