= 1919 Drexel Dragons football team =

American college football season

1919 Drexel Dragons football
- Conference: Independent
- Record: 0–4
- Head coach: W. L. Ridpath (1st season)
- Home stadium: Strawbridge & Clothier Field

1919 Eastern college football independents records
	Conf.			Overall
Team	W	L	T	W		L		T
Harvard		–		9	–	0	–	1
Penn State		–		7	–	1	–	0
Swarthmore		–		7	–	1	–	0
Dartmouth		–		6	–	1	–	1
Colgate		–		5	–	1	–	1
New Hampshire		–		7	–	2	–	0
Lafayette		–		6	–	2	–	0
Washington & Jefferson		–		6	–	2	–	0
Williams		–		6	–	2	–	0
Syracuse		–		8	–	3	–	0
Penn		–		6	–	2	–	1
Pittsburgh		–		6	–	2	–	1
Lehigh		–		6	–	3	–	0
Princeton		–		4	–	2	–	1
Geneva		–		4	–	2	–	2
Army		–		6	–	3	–	0
Boston College		–		5	–	3	–	0
Holy Cross		–		5	–	3	–	0
Rutgers		–		5	–	3	–	0
Yale		–		5	–	3	–	0
Villanova		–		5	–	3	–	1
Brown		–		5	–	4	–	1
Bucknell		–		5	–	4	–	1
NYU		–		4	–	4	–	0
Carnegie Tech		–		3	–	4	–	0
Columbia		–		2	–	4	–	3
Cornell		–		3	–	5	–	0
Vermont		–		3	–	6	–	0
Franklin & Marshall		–		2	–	4	–	2
Tufts		–		2	–	5	–	0
Buffalo		–		0	–	5	–	1
Rhode Island State		–		0	–	8	–	1
Drexel		–		0	–	4	–	0

The 1919 Drexel Dragons football team represented Drexel Institute—now known as Drexel University—in the 1919 college football season. Led by W. L. Ridpath in this first and only season as head coach, the team compiled a record of 0–4.

== Schedule ==
Date	Time	Opponent	Site	Result
October 18		Albright	Strawbridge & Clothier Field; Philadelphia, PA	L 0–38
November 8	3:00 pm	Susquehanna	Strawbridge & Clothier Field; Philadelphia, PA	L 0–61
November 15		St. John's (MD)		L 0–41
November 22		Gallaudet	Philadelphia, PA	L 3–31
All times are in Eastern time

== Roster ==
1919 Drexel Dragons football team roster
Players			Coaches
Offense: Pos. / # / Name / Class	Defense: Pos. / # / Name / Class	Special teams: Pos. / # / Name / Class	Head coach W. L. Ridpath (Swarthmore) Coordinators/assistant coaches Legend: (C) Team captain; (S) Suspended; (I) Ineligible; Injured; Redshirt
