= 1919 Vermont Green and Gold football team =

American college football season

1919 Vermont Green and Gold football
- Conference: Independent
- Record: 3–6
- Head coach: William P. Edmunds (1st season)
- Home stadium: Centennial Field

1919 Eastern college football independents records
	Conf.			Overall
Team	W	L	T	W		L		T
Harvard		–		9	–	0	–	1
Penn State		–		7	–	1	–	0
Swarthmore		–		7	–	1	–	0
Dartmouth		–		6	–	1	–	1
Colgate		–		5	–	1	–	1
New Hampshire		–		7	–	2	–	0
Lafayette		–		6	–	2	–	0
Washington & Jefferson		–		6	–	2	–	0
Williams		–		6	–	2	–	0
Syracuse		–		8	–	3	–	0
Penn		–		6	–	2	–	1
Pittsburgh		–		6	–	2	–	1
Lehigh		–		6	–	3	–	0
Princeton		–		4	–	2	–	1
Geneva		–		4	–	2	–	2
Army		–		6	–	3	–	0
Boston College		–		5	–	3	–	0
Holy Cross		–		5	–	3	–	0
Rutgers		–		5	–	3	–	0
Yale		–		5	–	3	–	0
Villanova		–		5	–	3	–	1
Brown		–		5	–	4	–	1
Bucknell		–		5	–	4	–	1
NYU		–		4	–	4	–	0
Carnegie Tech		–		3	–	4	–	0
Columbia		–		2	–	4	–	3
Cornell		–		3	–	5	–	0
Vermont		–		3	–	6	–	0
Franklin & Marshall		–		2	–	4	–	2
Tufts		–		2	–	5	–	0
Buffalo		–		0	–	5	–	1
Rhode Island State		–		0	–	8	–	1
Drexel		–		0	–	4	–	0

The 1919 Vermont Green and Gold football team was an American football team that represented the University of Vermont as an independent during the 1919 college football season. In their only year under head coach William P. Edmunds, the team compiled a 3–6 record.

== Schedule ==
Date	Opponent	Site	Result	Attendance	Source
September 27	Clarkson	Centennial Field; Burlington, VT	W 41–2		
October 4	at Syracuse	Archbold Stadium; Syracuse, NY	L 0–27	5,000	
October 11	at Columbia	South Field; New York, NY	L 0–7	5,000	
October 18	New Hampshire	Centennial Field; Burlington, VT	L 0–10		
October 25	at Massachusetts	Alumni Field; Amherst, MA	L 0–25		
November 1	Hamilton	Clinton, NY	W 6–0		
November 8	at Norwich	Sabine Field; Northfield, VT	L 0–13		
November 15	at New York Aggies	Ebbets Field; Brooklyn, NY	W 10–6	400	
November 22	Middlebury	Centennial Field; Burlington, VT	L 14–20		
