= Roy J. Guyer =

American sports coach (1885–1956)

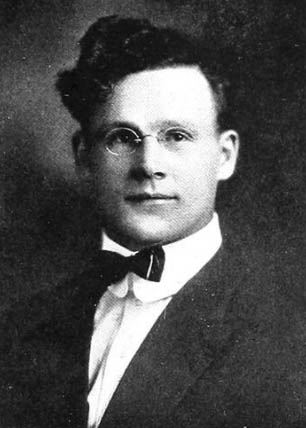

Biographical details
- Born: October 25, 1885; Newbridge, Pennsylvania, U.S.
- Died: April 3, 1954 (aged 68); Storrs, Connecticut, U.S.

Playing career

Football
- 1903: Shippensburg
- 1904–1907: Lebanon Valley
- 1912: Springfield

Basketball
- 1906–1910: Lebanon Valley

Coaching career (HC unless noted)

Football
- 1908–1910: Lebanon Valley
- 1913–1916: Lebanon Valley
- 1919: Connecticut

Basketball
- 1908–1909: Lebanon Valley
- 1910–1917: Lebanon Valley
- 1922–1923: Connecticut

Baseball
- 1908–1911: Lebanon Valley
- 1913–1917: Lebanon Valley
- 1919: Connecticut

Soccer
- 1929: Connecticut

Administrative career (AD unless noted)
- 1919–1936: Connecticut

Head coaching record
- Overall: 27–39–2 (football); 60–49–3 (baseball); 2–2 (soccer)

Roy Jones Guyer (October 25, 1885 – April 3, 1956) was an American college football player and college football, basketball, baseball, and soccer coach. He served as the head football coach at Lebanon Valley College from 1908 to 1910 and again from 1913 to 1917 and at the University of Connecticut in 1919, compiling a career college football coaching record of 27–39–2. Guyer died on April 3, 1956, at his home in Storrs, Connecticut.

== Head coaching record ==
=== Football ===
Year	Team	Overall	Conference	Standing	Bowl/playoffs
Lebanon Valley Flying Dutchmen (Independent) (1908–1910)
1908	Lebanon Valley	0–7			
1909	Lebanon Valley	5–4			
1910	Lebanon Valley	0–7			
Lebanon Valley Flying Dutchmen (Independent) (1913–1916)
1913	Lebanon Valley	5–5			
1914	Lebanon Valley	6–2			
1915	Lebanon Valley	4–4–1			
1916	Lebanon Valley	5–4–1			
Lebanon Valley:		25–33–2			
Connecticut Aggies (Athletic League of New England State Colleges) (1919)
1919	Connecticut	2–6	1–2		
Connecticut:		2–6	1–2		
Total:		27–39–2			

=== Baseball ===
The following table depicts Guyer's record as head baseball coach at Connecticut.

Record table
Season	Team	Overall	Conference	Standing	Postseason
Connecticut Aggies (1919)
1919	Connecticut	5–6			
Total:		5–6			
