= 1919 Bucknell football team =

American college football season

1919 Bucknell football
- Conference: Independent
- Record: 5–4–1
- Head coach: Pete Reynolds (1st season)
- Home stadium: Tustin Field

1919 Eastern college football independents records
	Conf.			Overall
Team	W	L	T	W		L		T
Harvard		–		9	–	0	–	1
Penn State		–		7	–	1	–	0
Swarthmore		–		7	–	1	–	0
Dartmouth		–		6	–	1	–	1
Colgate		–		5	–	1	–	1
New Hampshire		–		7	–	2	–	0
Lafayette		–		6	–	2	–	0
Washington & Jefferson		–		6	–	2	–	0
Williams		–		6	–	2	–	0
Syracuse		–		8	–	3	–	0
Penn		–		6	–	2	–	1
Pittsburgh		–		6	–	2	–	1
Lehigh		–		6	–	3	–	0
Princeton		–		4	–	2	–	1
Geneva		–		4	–	2	–	2
Army		–		6	–	3	–	0
Boston College		–		5	–	3	–	0
Holy Cross		–		5	–	3	–	0
Rutgers		–		5	–	3	–	0
Yale		–		5	–	3	–	0
Villanova		–		5	–	3	–	1
Brown		–		5	–	4	–	1
Bucknell		–		5	–	4	–	1
NYU		–		4	–	4	–	0
Carnegie Tech		–		3	–	4	–	0
Columbia		–		2	–	4	–	3
Cornell		–		3	–	5	–	0
Vermont		–		3	–	6	–	0
Franklin & Marshall		–		2	–	4	–	2
Tufts		–		2	–	5	–	0
Buffalo		–		0	–	5	–	1
Rhode Island State		–		0	–	8	–	1
Drexel		–		0	–	4	–	0

The 1919 Bucknell football team was an American football team that represented Bucknell University as an independent during the 1919 college football season. In its first season under head coach Pete Reynolds, the team compiled a 5–4–1 record.

== Schedule ==
Date	Opponent	Site	Result	Attendance	Source
September 27	at Penn	Franklin Field; Philadelphia, PA	L 0–16		
October 4	Bloomsburg Normal	Tustin Field; Lewisburg, PA	W 45–0		
October 11	at Penn State	New Beaver Field; State College, PA	L 0–9		
October 18	Muhlenberg	Tustin Field; Lewisburg, PA	W 27–0		
October 25	at Navy	Worden Field; Annapolis, MD	L 6–21		
November 1	St. Bonaventure	Tustin Field; Lewisburg, PA	W 27–0		
November 8	at Syracuse	Archbold Stadium; Syracuse, NY	L 0–9		
November 15	vs. Gettysburg	Island Park; Harrisburg, PA	W 17–0	5,000	
November 22	Susquehanna	Tustin Field; Lewisburg, PA	W 20–7		
November 27	at Dickinson	Carlisle, PA	T 0–0		
