= 1919 Penn State Nittany Lions football team =

American college football season

1919 Penn State Nittany Lions football
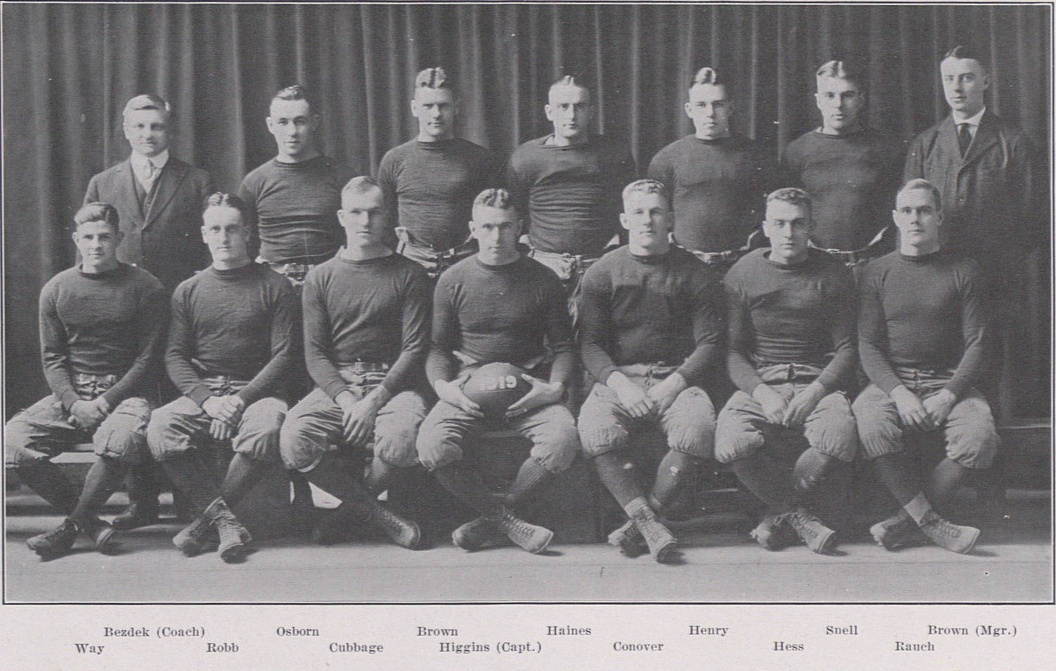
- Conference: Independent
- Record: 7–1
- Head coach: Hugo Bezdek (2nd season)
- Captain: Bob Higgins
- Home stadium: New Beaver Field

1919 Eastern college football independents records
	Conf.			Overall
Team	W	L	T	W		L		T
Harvard		–		9	–	0	–	1
Penn State		–		7	–	1	–	0
Swarthmore		–		7	–	1	–	0
Dartmouth		–		6	–	1	–	1
Colgate		–		5	–	1	–	1
New Hampshire		–		7	–	2	–	0
Lafayette		–		6	–	2	–	0
Washington & Jefferson		–		6	–	2	–	0
Williams		–		6	–	2	–	0
Syracuse		–		8	–	3	–	0
Penn		–		6	–	2	–	1
Pittsburgh		–		6	–	2	–	1
Lehigh		–		6	–	3	–	0
Princeton		–		4	–	2	–	1
Geneva		–		4	–	2	–	2
Army		–		6	–	3	–	0
Boston College		–		5	–	3	–	0
Holy Cross		–		5	–	3	–	0
Rutgers		–		5	–	3	–	0
Yale		–		5	–	3	–	0
Villanova		–		5	–	3	–	1
Brown		–		5	–	4	–	1
Bucknell		–		5	–	4	–	1
NYU		–		4	–	4	–	0
Carnegie Tech		–		3	–	4	–	0
Columbia		–		2	–	4	–	3
Cornell		–		3	–	5	–	0
Vermont		–		3	–	6	–	0
Franklin & Marshall		–		2	–	4	–	2
Tufts		–		2	–	5	–	0
Buffalo		–		0	–	5	–	1
Rhode Island State		–		0	–	8	–	1
Drexel		–		0	–	4	–	0

The 1919 Penn State Nittany Lions football team represented the Pennsylvania State University as an independent during the 1919 college football season. The team was coached by Hugo Bezdek and played its home games in New Beaver Field in State College, Pennsylvania.

== Schedule ==
Date	Opponent	Site	Result	Attendance	Source
October 4	Gettysburg	New Beaver Field; State College, PA	W 33–0		
October 11	Bucknell	New Beaver Field; State College, PA	W 9–0		
October 18	at Dartmouth	Memorial Field; Hanover, NH	L 13–19	4,500	
October 25	Ursinus	New Beaver Field; State College, PA	W 48–7		
November 1	at Penn	Franklin Field; Philadelphia, PA	W 10–0	20,000	
November 8	Lehigh	New Beaver Field; State College, PA	W 20–7	6,000	
November 15	at Cornell	Schoellkopf Field; Ithaca, NY	W 20–0		
November 27	at Pittsburgh	Forbes Field; Pittsburgh, PA (rivalry)	W 20–0	25,000	
