= 1919 Williams Ephs football team =

American college football season

1919 Williams Ephs football
- Conference: Independent
- Record: 6–2
- Head coach: Joseph W. Brooks (2nd season)
- Captain: Benny Boynton
- Home stadium: Weston Field

1919 Eastern college football independents records
	Conf.			Overall
Team	W	L	T	W		L		T
Harvard		–		9	–	0	–	1
Penn State		–		7	–	1	–	0
Swarthmore		–		7	–	1	–	0
Dartmouth		–		6	–	1	–	1
Colgate		–		5	–	1	–	1
New Hampshire		–		7	–	2	–	0
Lafayette		–		6	–	2	–	0
Washington & Jefferson		–		6	–	2	–	0
Williams		–		6	–	2	–	0
Syracuse		–		8	–	3	–	0
Penn		–		6	–	2	–	1
Pittsburgh		–		6	–	2	–	1
Lehigh		–		6	–	3	–	0
Princeton		–		4	–	2	–	1
Geneva		–		4	–	2	–	2
Army		–		6	–	3	–	0
Boston College		–		5	–	3	–	0
Holy Cross		–		5	–	3	–	0
Rutgers		–		5	–	3	–	0
Yale		–		5	–	3	–	0
Villanova		–		5	–	3	–	1
Brown		–		5	–	4	–	1
Bucknell		–		5	–	4	–	1
NYU		–		4	–	4	–	0
Carnegie Tech		–		3	–	4	–	0
Columbia		–		2	–	4	–	3
Cornell		–		3	–	5	–	0
Vermont		–		3	–	6	–	0
Franklin & Marshall		–		2	–	4	–	2
Tufts		–		2	–	5	–	0
Buffalo		–		0	–	5	–	1
Rhode Island State		–		0	–	8	–	1
Drexel		–		0	–	4	–	0

The 1919 Williams Ephs football team represented Williams College as an independent during the 1919 college football season. Led by second-year head coach Joseph W. Brooks, the Ephs compiled a record of 6–2.

== Schedule ==
Date	Opponent	Site	Result	Attendance
September 27	at RPI	Troy, NY	W 22–0	
October 4	Union (NY)	Weston Field; Williamstown, MA	W 23–0	
October 11	at Cornell	Schoellkopf Field; Ithaca, NY	L 0–3	
October 18	at Columbia	South Field; New York, NY	W 25–0	12,000
October 25	Hamilton	Weston Field; Williamstown, MA	W 13–0	
November 1	at Wesleyan	Middletown, CT	L 0–16	
November 8	Middlebury	Weston Field; Williamstown, MA	W 19–0	
November 16	Amherst	Weston Field; Williamstown, MA (rivalry)	W 30–0	
