= 1919 Brown Bears football team =

American college football season

1919 Brown Bears football
- Conference: Independent
- Record: 5–4–1
- Head coach: Edward N. Robinson (18th season)
- Captain: R. H. Nicholas
- Home stadium: Andrews Field

1919 Eastern college football independents records
	Conf.			Overall
Team	W	L	T	W		L		T
Harvard		–		9	–	0	–	1
Penn State		–		7	–	1	–	0
Swarthmore		–		7	–	1	–	0
Dartmouth		–		6	–	1	–	1
Colgate		–		5	–	1	–	1
New Hampshire		–		7	–	2	–	0
Lafayette		–		6	–	2	–	0
Washington & Jefferson		–		6	–	2	–	0
Williams		–		6	–	2	–	0
Syracuse		–		8	–	3	–	0
Penn		–		6	–	2	–	1
Pittsburgh		–		6	–	2	–	1
Lehigh		–		6	–	3	–	0
Princeton		–		4	–	2	–	1
Geneva		–		4	–	2	–	2
Army		–		6	–	3	–	0
Boston College		–		5	–	3	–	0
Holy Cross		–		5	–	3	–	0
Rutgers		–		5	–	3	–	0
Yale		–		5	–	3	–	0
Villanova		–		5	–	3	–	1
Brown		–		5	–	4	–	1
Bucknell		–		5	–	4	–	1
NYU		–		4	–	4	–	0
Carnegie Tech		–		3	–	4	–	0
Columbia		–		2	–	4	–	3
Cornell		–		3	–	5	–	0
Vermont		–		3	–	6	–	0
Franklin & Marshall		–		2	–	4	–	2
Tufts		–		2	–	5	–	0
Buffalo		–		0	–	5	–	1
Rhode Island State		–		0	–	8	–	1
Drexel		–		0	–	4	–	0

The 1919 Brown Bears football team represented Brown University as an independent during the 1919 college football season. Led by 18th-year head coach Edward N. Robinson, Brown compiled a record of 5–4–1.

== Schedule ==
Date	Time	Opponent	Site	Result	Attendance	Source
September 27		Rhode Island State	Andrews Field; Providence, RI (rivalry)	W 27–0		
October 4		Bowdoin	Andrews Field; Providence, RI	W 7–0		
October 11		at Colgate	Whitnall Field; Hamilton, NY	L 0–14	5,000	
October 18	3:00 p.m.	at Harvard	Harvard Stadium; Boston, MA	L 0–7	23,000	
October 25		Norwich	Andrews Field; Providence, RI	W 20–0		
November 1		Syracuse	Andrews Field; Providence, RI	L 0–13		
November 8	2:00 p.m.	at Yale	Yale Bowl; New Haven, CT	L 0–14	30,000	
November 15	2:00 p.m.	vs. Dartmouth	Braves Field; Boston, MA	W 7–6	20,000	
November 22		New Hampshire	Andrews Field; Providence, RI	W 6–0		
November 27		at Columbia	Marshall Field; Chicago, IL	T 7–7	8,000	
All times are in Eastern time
