= 1919 Princeton Tigers football team =

American college football season

1919 Princeton Tigers football
- Conference: Independent
- Record: 4–2–1
- Head coach: Bill Roper (6th season)
- Offensive scheme: Short punt
- Captain: Hack McGraw
- Home stadium: Palmer Stadium

1919 Eastern college football independents records
	Conf.			Overall
Team	W	L	T	W		L		T
Harvard		–		9	–	0	–	1
Penn State		–		7	–	1	–	0
Swarthmore		–		7	–	1	–	0
Dartmouth		–		6	–	1	–	1
Colgate		–		5	–	1	–	1
New Hampshire		–		7	–	2	–	0
Lafayette		–		6	–	2	–	0
Washington & Jefferson		–		6	–	2	–	0
Williams		–		6	–	2	–	0
Syracuse		–		8	–	3	–	0
Penn		–		6	–	2	–	1
Pittsburgh		–		6	–	2	–	1
Lehigh		–		6	–	3	–	0
Princeton		–		4	–	2	–	1
Geneva		–		4	–	2	–	2
Army		–		6	–	3	–	0
Boston College		–		5	–	3	–	0
Holy Cross		–		5	–	3	–	0
Rutgers		–		5	–	3	–	0
Yale		–		5	–	3	–	0
Villanova		–		5	–	3	–	1
Brown		–		5	–	4	–	1
Bucknell		–		5	–	4	–	1
NYU		–		4	–	4	–	0
Carnegie Tech		–		3	–	4	–	0
Columbia		–		2	–	4	–	3
Cornell		–		3	–	5	–	0
Vermont		–		3	–	6	–	0
Franklin & Marshall		–		2	–	4	–	2
Tufts		–		2	–	5	–	0
Buffalo		–		0	–	5	–	1
Rhode Island State		–		0	–	8	–	1
Drexel		–		0	–	4	–	0

The 1919 Princeton Tigers football team represented Princeton University in the 1919 college football season. The team finished with a 4–2–1 record under sixth-year head coach Bill Roper. No Princeton players were selected as consensus first-team honorees on the 1919 College Football All-America Team, but halfback Murray Trimble was selected as a first-team All-American by the Reno Evening Gazette, and a second-team All-American by Walter Camp.

== Schedule ==
Date	Time	Opponent	Site	Result	Attendance	Source
October 4		Trinity (CT)	Palmer Stadium; Princeton, NJ	W 28–0		
October 11		Lafayette	Palmer Stadium; Princeton, NJ	W 9–6		
October 18		Rochester	Palmer Stadium; Princeton, NJ	W 34–0		
October 25		Colgate	Palmer Stadium; Princeton, NJ	L 0–7		
November 1		West Virginia	Palmer Stadium; Princeton, NJ	L 0–25		
November 8	2:00 p.m.	Harvard	Palmer Stadium; Princeton, NJ (rivalry)	T 10–10	15,000	
November 15		at Yale	Yale Bowl; New Haven, CT (rivalry)	W 13–6		
All times are in Eastern time
