= 1919 Buffalo Bisons football team =

American college football season

1919 Buffalo Bisons football
- Conference: Independent
- Record: 0–5–1
- Head coach: Art Powell (4th season)
- Captain: Earle Roberts
- Home stadium: International Park

1919 Eastern college football independents records
	Conf.			Overall
Team	W	L	T	W		L		T
Harvard		–		9	–	0	–	1
Penn State		–		7	–	1	–	0
Swarthmore		–		7	–	1	–	0
Dartmouth		–		6	–	1	–	1
Colgate		–		5	–	1	–	1
New Hampshire		–		7	–	2	–	0
Lafayette		–		6	–	2	–	0
Washington & Jefferson		–		6	–	2	–	0
Williams		–		6	–	2	–	0
Syracuse		–		8	–	3	–	0
Penn		–		6	–	2	–	1
Pittsburgh		–		6	–	2	–	1
Lehigh		–		6	–	3	–	0
Princeton		–		4	–	2	–	1
Geneva		–		4	–	2	–	2
Army		–		6	–	3	–	0
Boston College		–		5	–	3	–	0
Holy Cross		–		5	–	3	–	0
Rutgers		–		5	–	3	–	0
Yale		–		5	–	3	–	0
Villanova		–		5	–	3	–	1
Brown		–		5	–	4	–	1
Bucknell		–		5	–	4	–	1
NYU		–		4	–	4	–	0
Carnegie Tech		–		3	–	4	–	0
Columbia		–		2	–	4	–	3
Cornell		–		3	–	5	–	0
Vermont		–		3	–	6	–	0
Franklin & Marshall		–		2	–	4	–	2
Tufts		–		2	–	5	–	0
Buffalo		–		0	–	5	–	1
Rhode Island State		–		0	–	8	–	1
Drexel		–		0	–	4	–	0

The 1919 Buffalo Bisons football team represented the University of Buffalo as an independent during the 1919 college football season. Led by Art Powell in his fourth season as head coach, the team compiled a record of 0–5–1.

== Schedule ==
Date	Opponent	Site	Result	Source
October 19	St. Lawrence	International Park; Buffalo, NY	L 0–23	
October 26	Hobart	International Park; Buffalo, NY	L 6–21	
November 1	at Rochester	Rochester, NY	L 0–33	
November 8	Westminster (PA)	International Park; Buffalo, NY	L 0–6	
November 15	St. Bonaventure	International Park; Buffalo, NY	T 6–6	
November 22	Detroit	International Park; Buffalo, NY	L 0–25	
