= 1919 Columbia Lions football team =

American college football season

1919 Columbia Lions football
- Conference: Independent
- Record: 2–4–3
- Head coach: Fred Dawson (2nd season)
- Captain: John D. Kennedy
- Home stadium: South Field

1919 Eastern college football independents records
	Conf.			Overall
Team	W	L	T	W		L		T
Harvard		–		9	–	0	–	1
Penn State		–		7	–	1	–	0
Swarthmore		–		7	–	1	–	0
Dartmouth		–		6	–	1	–	1
Colgate		–		5	–	1	–	1
New Hampshire		–		7	–	2	–	0
Lafayette		–		6	–	2	–	0
Washington & Jefferson		–		6	–	2	–	0
Williams		–		6	–	2	–	0
Syracuse		–		8	–	3	–	0
Penn		–		6	–	2	–	1
Pittsburgh		–		6	–	2	–	1
Lehigh		–		6	–	3	–	0
Princeton		–		4	–	2	–	1
Geneva		–		4	–	2	–	2
Army		–		6	–	3	–	0
Boston College		–		5	–	3	–	0
Holy Cross		–		5	–	3	–	0
Rutgers		–		5	–	3	–	0
Yale		–		5	–	3	–	0
Villanova		–		5	–	3	–	1
Brown		–		5	–	4	–	1
Bucknell		–		5	–	4	–	1
NYU		–		4	–	4	–	0
Carnegie Tech		–		3	–	4	–	0
Columbia		–		2	–	4	–	3
Cornell		–		3	–	5	–	0
Vermont		–		3	–	6	–	0
Franklin & Marshall		–		2	–	4	–	2
Tufts		–		2	–	5	–	0
Buffalo		–		0	–	5	–	1
Rhode Island State		–		0	–	8	–	1
Drexel		–		0	–	4	–	0

The 1919 Columbia Lions football team was an American football team that represented Columbia University as an independent during the 1919 college football season. In his second and final season, head coach Fred Dawson led the team to a 2–4–3 record, outscored 107 to 48 by opponents.

The team played its home games on South Field, part of the university's campus in Morningside Heights in Upper Manhattan.

== Schedule ==
Date	Opponent	Site	Result	Attendance	Source
October 4	USS Arizona	South Field; New York, NY	T 0–0		
October 11	Vermont	South Field; New York, NY	W 7–0		
October 18	Williams	South Field; New York, NY	L 0–25	12,000	
October 25	Amherst	South Field; New York, NY	W 9–7	7,000	
November 1	Union (NY)	South Field; New York, NY	T 0–0	5,000	
November 8	Stevens	South Field; New York, NY	L 0–13	6,000	
November 15	Wesleyan	South Field; New York, NY	L 13–28	7,500	
November 22	NYU	South Field; New York, NY	L 12–27	14,000	
November 27	Brown	South Field; New York, NY	T 7–7	8,000	
