= 1919 New Hampshire football team =

American college football season

1919 New Hampshire football
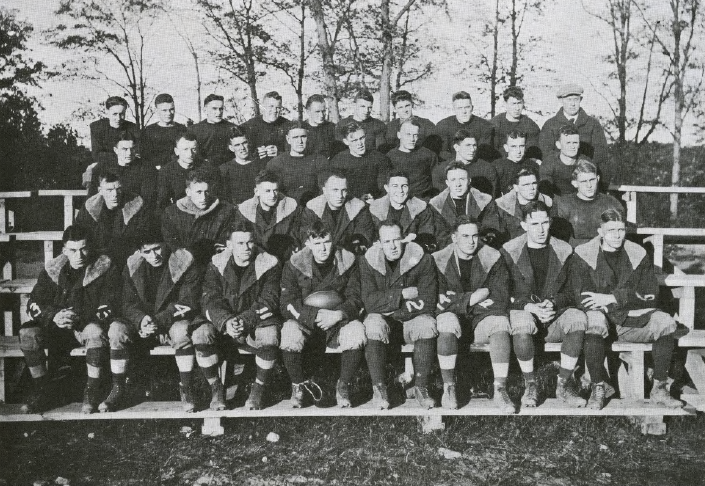
- Conference: Independent
- Record: 7–2
- Head coach: Butch Cowell (4th season)
- Captain: E. Dewey Graham
- Home stadium: College Oval (Note: College Oval (also known as College Field) was New Hampshire's home field through the 1920 season; Memorial Field, dedicated in 1921, was built in the same location.)

1919 Eastern college football independents records
	Conf.			Overall
Team	W	L	T	W		L		T
Harvard		–		9	–	0	–	1
Penn State		–		7	–	1	–	0
Swarthmore		–		7	–	1	–	0
Dartmouth		–		6	–	1	–	1
Colgate		–		5	–	1	–	1
New Hampshire		–		7	–	2	–	0
Lafayette		–		6	–	2	–	0
Washington & Jefferson		–		6	–	2	–	0
Williams		–		6	–	2	–	0
Syracuse		–		8	–	3	–	0
Penn		–		6	–	2	–	1
Pittsburgh		–		6	–	2	–	1
Lehigh		–		6	–	3	–	0
Princeton		–		4	–	2	–	1
Geneva		–		4	–	2	–	2
Army		–		6	–	3	–	0
Boston College		–		5	–	3	–	0
Holy Cross		–		5	–	3	–	0
Rutgers		–		5	–	3	–	0
Yale		–		5	–	3	–	0
Villanova		–		5	–	3	–	1
Brown		–		5	–	4	–	1
Bucknell		–		5	–	4	–	1
NYU		–		4	–	4	–	0
Carnegie Tech		–		3	–	4	–	0
Columbia		–		2	–	4	–	3
Cornell		–		3	–	5	–	0
Vermont		–		3	–	6	–	0
Franklin & Marshall		–		2	–	4	–	2
Tufts		–		2	–	5	–	0
Buffalo		–		0	–	5	–	1
Rhode Island State		–		0	–	8	–	1
Drexel		–		0	–	4	–	0

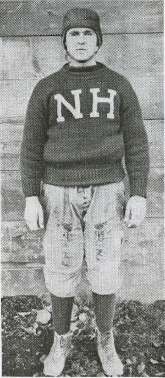
Team captain E. Dewey Graham c. 1919, in the annual college yearbook

The 1919 New Hampshire football team (Note: The school did not adopt the Wildcats nickname until February 1926; before then, they were generally referred to as "the blue and white".) was an American football team that represented New Hampshire College of Agriculture and the Mechanic Arts (Note: The school was often referred to as New Hampshire College or New Hampshire State College in newspapers of the era.) during the 1919 college football season—the school became the University of New Hampshire in 1923. In its fourth season under head coach William "Butch" Cowell, (Note: This was Cowell's 5th year and 4th season as head coach, as the school did not field a varsity team in 1918 due to World War I.) the team compiled a 7–2 record, while outscoring their opponents by a total of 113 to 29. No opponent scored more than seven points against New Hampshire during the season, and the team won four of its games by shutout. This was the first season that the school fielded a freshman football team, in addition to the varsity.

== Schedule ==
Date	Opponent	Site	Result	Attendance	Source
September 27	Connecticut	College Oval; Durham, NH	W 13–0		
October 4	at Bates	Lewiston, ME	W 3–0		
October 11	at Norwich	Northfield, VT	W 10–7		
October 18	at Vermont	Centennial Field; Burlington, VT	W 10–0		
October 25	Lowell Textile (Note: Lowell Textile is now University of Massachusetts Lowell.)	College Oval; Durham, NH	W 12–2		
November 1	Massachusetts^{†}	College Oval; Durham, NH (rivalry)	W 9–7	2,000	
November 8	at Worcester Tech	Alumni Stadium; Worcester, MA	W 53–0		
November 15	Maine	College Oval; Durham, NH (rivalry)	L 3–7	3,500	
November 22	at Brown	Andrews Field; Providence, RI	L 0–6		
^{†}Homecoming; Source:

The September 27 game was marred by the death of Connecticut center Gardner Dow, who was knocked unconscious while making a tackle; he died later that evening in Durham. Connecticut's athletic fields in Storrs were subsequently named after Dow. Governor of New Hampshire John H. Bartlett was in attendance at the game.

The November 8 game remains the last time that the Worcester Tech—now Worcester Polytechnic Institute (WPI)—and New Hampshire football programs have met.

The November 15 contest against Maine ended in controversy, as New Hampshire attempted a trick play in the final minute of the game, potentially scoring and taking a 9–7 lead. The referee was indecisive, and the head coaches of both teams agreed that a ruling on the play should be made by the "central board of officials". The play in question happened on a New Hampshire punt; a New Hampshire player, who had been behind the punter at the time the ball was kicked, recovered the untouched ball in Maine's end zone, resulting in either a touchdown for New Hampshire or a touchback for Maine. The play was intended to have the attributes of a free kick, during which the ball can be recovered by either team. On November 18, officials ruled that the play had to be treated as a punt and not a free kick, deeming the outcome a touchback, and declaring Maine the winner.
