= 1919 Lehigh Brown and White football team =

American college football season

1919 Lehigh Brown and White football
- Conference: Independent
- Record: 6–3
- Head coach: Tom Keady (8th season)
- Home stadium: Taylor Stadium

1919 Eastern college football independents records
	Conf.			Overall
Team	W	L	T	W		L		T
Harvard		–		9	–	0	–	1
Penn State		–		7	–	1	–	0
Swarthmore		–		7	–	1	–	0
Dartmouth		–		6	–	1	–	1
Colgate		–		5	–	1	–	1
New Hampshire		–		7	–	2	–	0
Lafayette		–		6	–	2	–	0
Washington & Jefferson		–		6	–	2	–	0
Williams		–		6	–	2	–	0
Syracuse		–		8	–	3	–	0
Penn		–		6	–	2	–	1
Pittsburgh		–		6	–	2	–	1
Lehigh		–		6	–	3	–	0
Princeton		–		4	–	2	–	1
Geneva		–		4	–	2	–	2
Army		–		6	–	3	–	0
Boston College		–		5	–	3	–	0
Holy Cross		–		5	–	3	–	0
Rutgers		–		5	–	3	–	0
Yale		–		5	–	3	–	0
Villanova		–		5	–	3	–	1
Brown		–		5	–	4	–	1
Bucknell		–		5	–	4	–	1
NYU		–		4	–	4	–	0
Carnegie Tech		–		3	–	4	–	0
Columbia		–		2	–	4	–	3
Cornell		–		3	–	5	–	0
Vermont		–		3	–	6	–	0
Franklin & Marshall		–		2	–	4	–	2
Tufts		–		2	–	5	–	0
Buffalo		–		0	–	5	–	1
Rhode Island State		–		0	–	8	–	1
Drexel		–		0	–	4	–	0

The 1919 Lehigh Brown and White football team was an American football team that represented Lehigh University as an independent during the 1919 college football season. In its eighth season under head coach Tom Keady, the team compiled a 6–3 record and outscored opponents by a total of 192 to 51. Lehigh played home games at Taylor Stadium in Bethlehem, Pennsylvania.

== Schedule ==
Date	Opponent	Site	Result	Attendance	Source
September 27	Villanova	Taylor Stadium; Bethlehem, PA	W 47–0		
October 4	Ursinus	Taylor Stadium; Bethlehem, PA	W 13–0		
October 11	Rutgers	Taylor Stadium; Bethlehem, PA	W 19–0		
October 18	New York Aggies	Taylor Stadium; Bethlehem, PA	W 51–0		
October 25	Carnegie Tech	Taylor Stadium; Bethlehem, PA	W 16–0		
November 1	Pittsburgh	Taylor Stadium; Bethlehem, PA	L 0–14	10,000	
November 8	at Penn State	New Beaver Field; State College, PA	L 7–20	6,000	
November 15	Muhlenberg	Taylor Stadium; Bethlehem, PA	W 33–7		
November 22	Lafayette	Taylor Stadium; Bethlehem, PA (rivalry)	L 6–10		
