= 1919 Dartmouth football team =

American college football season

1919 Dartmouth football
- Conference: Independent
- Record: 6–1–1
- Head coach: Clarence Spears (3rd season)
- Captain: Jackson Cannell

1919 Eastern college football independents records
	Conf.			Overall
Team	W	L	T	W		L		T
Harvard		–		9	–	0	–	1
Penn State		–		7	–	1	–	0
Swarthmore		–		7	–	1	–	0
Dartmouth		–		6	–	1	–	1
Colgate		–		5	–	1	–	1
New Hampshire		–		7	–	2	–	0
Lafayette		–		6	–	2	–	0
Washington & Jefferson		–		6	–	2	–	0
Williams		–		6	–	2	–	0
Syracuse		–		8	–	3	–	0
Penn		–		6	–	2	–	1
Pittsburgh		–		6	–	2	–	1
Lehigh		–		6	–	3	–	0
Princeton		–		4	–	2	–	1
Geneva		–		4	–	2	–	2
Army		–		6	–	3	–	0
Boston College		–		5	–	3	–	0
Holy Cross		–		5	–	3	–	0
Rutgers		–		5	–	3	–	0
Yale		–		5	–	3	–	0
Villanova		–		5	–	3	–	1
Brown		–		5	–	4	–	1
Bucknell		–		5	–	4	–	1
NYU		–		4	–	4	–	0
Carnegie Tech		–		3	–	4	–	0
Columbia		–		2	–	4	–	3
Cornell		–		3	–	5	–	0
Vermont		–		3	–	6	–	0
Franklin & Marshall		–		2	–	4	–	2
Tufts		–		2	–	5	–	0
Buffalo		–		0	–	5	–	1
Rhode Island State		–		0	–	8	–	1
Drexel		–		0	–	4	–	0

The 1919 Dartmouth football team was an American football team that represented Dartmouth College as an independent during the 1919 college football season. In its third season under head coach Clarence Spears, the team compiled a 6–1–1 record and outscored opponents by a total of 141 to 53. Jackson Cannell was the team captain.

== Schedule ==
Date	Time	Opponent	Site	Result	Attendance	Source
September 27		Springfield YMCA	Hanover, NH	W 40–0		
October 4		Norwich	Hanover, NH	W 13–0		
October 11		Massachusetts	Hanover, NH	W 27–7		
October 18		Penn State	Hanover, NH	W 19–13	4,500	
October 25		vs. Cornell	Polo Grounds; New York, NY (rivalry)	W 9–0		
November 1		Colgate	Hanover, NH	T 7–7		
November 8		vs. Penn	Polo Grounds; New York, NY	W 20–19		
November 15	2:00 p.m.	vs. Brown	Braves Field; Boston, MA	L 6–7	20,000	
All times are in Eastern time
