= 1919 Rutgers Queensmen football team =

American college football season

1919 Rutgers Queensmen football
- Conference: Independent
- Record: 5–3
- Head coach: George Sanford (7th season)
- Home stadium: Neilson Field

1919 Eastern college football independents records
	Conf.			Overall
Team	W	L	T	W		L		T
Harvard		–		9	–	0	–	1
Penn State		–		7	–	1	–	0
Swarthmore		–		7	–	1	–	0
Dartmouth		–		6	–	1	–	1
Colgate		–		5	–	1	–	1
New Hampshire		–		7	–	2	–	0
Lafayette		–		6	–	2	–	0
Washington & Jefferson		–		6	–	2	–	0
Williams		–		6	–	2	–	0
Syracuse		–		8	–	3	–	0
Penn		–		6	–	2	–	1
Pittsburgh		–		6	–	2	–	1
Lehigh		–		6	–	3	–	0
Princeton		–		4	–	2	–	1
Geneva		–		4	–	2	–	2
Army		–		6	–	3	–	0
Boston College		–		5	–	3	–	0
Holy Cross		–		5	–	3	–	0
Rutgers		–		5	–	3	–	0
Yale		–		5	–	3	–	0
Villanova		–		5	–	3	–	1
Brown		–		5	–	4	–	1
Bucknell		–		5	–	4	–	1
NYU		–		4	–	4	–	0
Carnegie Tech		–		3	–	4	–	0
Columbia		–		2	–	4	–	3
Cornell		–		3	–	5	–	0
Vermont		–		3	–	6	–	0
Franklin & Marshall		–		2	–	4	–	2
Tufts		–		2	–	5	–	0
Buffalo		–		0	–	5	–	1
Rhode Island State		–		0	–	8	–	1
Drexel		–		0	–	4	–	0

The 1919 Rutgers Queensmen football team represented Rutgers University as an independent during the 1919 college football season. In their seventh season under head coach George Sanford, the Queensmen compiled a 5–3 record and outscored their opponents, 115 to 70. The team's victories included games against North Carolina, Boston College, and Northwestern. The team's losses included games against Syracuse and West Virginia. Sanford was inducted into the College Football Hall of Fame in 1971.

== Schedule ==
Date	Time	Opponent	Site	Result	Attendance	Source
September 27		Ursinus	Neilson Field; New Brunswick, NJ	W 34–0	2,000	
October 4		North Carolina	Neilson Field; New Brunswick, NJ	W 19–9		
October 11		at Lehigh	Bethlehem, PA	L 0–19		
October 25		New York Aggies	Neilson Field; New Brunswick, NJ	W 14–0		
November 4		vs. Syracuse	Polo Grounds; New York, NY	L 0–14	12,000	
November 8	2:00 p.m.	at Boston College	Fenway Park; Boston, MA	W 13–7		
November 15		West Virginia	Neilson Field; New Brunswick, NJ	L 7–30		
November 22		vs. Northwestern	Harrison Field; Harrison, NJ	W 28–0		
All times are in Eastern time
