= 1919 Yale Bulldogs football team =

American college football season

1919 Yale Bulldogs football
- Conference: Independent
- Record: 5–3
- Head coach: Albert Sharpe (1st season)
- Captain: J. Timothy Callahan
- Home stadium: Yale Bowl

1919 Eastern college football independents records
	Conf.			Overall
Team	W	L	T	W		L		T
Harvard		–		9	–	0	–	1
Penn State		–		7	–	1	–	0
Swarthmore		–		7	–	1	–	0
Dartmouth		–		6	–	1	–	1
Colgate		–		5	–	1	–	1
New Hampshire		–		7	–	2	–	0
Lafayette		–		6	–	2	–	0
Washington & Jefferson		–		6	–	2	–	0
Williams		–		6	–	2	–	0
Syracuse		–		8	–	3	–	0
Penn		–		6	–	2	–	1
Pittsburgh		–		6	–	2	–	1
Lehigh		–		6	–	3	–	0
Princeton		–		4	–	2	–	1
Geneva		–		4	–	2	–	2
Army		–		6	–	3	–	0
Boston College		–		5	–	3	–	0
Holy Cross		–		5	–	3	–	0
Rutgers		–		5	–	3	–	0
Yale		–		5	–	3	–	0
Villanova		–		5	–	3	–	1
Brown		–		5	–	4	–	1
Bucknell		–		5	–	4	–	1
NYU		–		4	–	4	–	0
Carnegie Tech		–		3	–	4	–	0
Columbia		–		2	–	4	–	3
Cornell		–		3	–	5	–	0
Vermont		–		3	–	6	–	0
Franklin & Marshall		–		2	–	4	–	2
Tufts		–		2	–	5	–	0
Buffalo		–		0	–	5	–	1
Rhode Island State		–		0	–	8	–	1
Drexel		–		0	–	4	–	0

The 1919 Yale Bulldogs football team represented Yale University in the 1919 college football season. The Bulldogs finished with a 5–3 record under first-year head coach Albert Sharpe. No Yale player received first-team honors on the 1919 College Football All-America Team.

== Schedule ==
Date	Time	Opponent	Site	Result	Attendance	Source
October 4		Springfield	Yale Bowl; New Haven, CT	W 20–0		
October 11		North Carolina	Yale Bowl; New Haven, CT	W 34–7		
October 18		Boston College	Yale Bowl; New Haven, CT	L 3–5		
October 25		Tufts	Yale Bowl; New Haven, CT	W 37–0		
November 1		Maryland State	Yale Bowl; New Haven, CT	W 31–0		
November 8	2:00 p.m.	Brown	Yale Bowl; New Haven, CT	W 14–0	30,000	
November 15		Princeton	Yale Bowl; New Haven, CT (rivalry)	L 6–13		
November 22		at Harvard	Harvard Stadium; Boston, MA (rivalry)	L 3–10	> 50,000	
All times are in Eastern time

== Roster ==
- John Acosta, G
- Mac Aldrich, HB
- Parker B. Allen, E
- James M. Braden, FB
- Tim Callahan, G
- Howard Campbell, HB
- Crane, HB
- Thomas V. Dickens, T
- Charles L. C. Galt, G
- William J. Galvin, E
- Elias D. K. Hamill, T
- Allen Hubbard, G
- Herbert M. Kempton, QB
- Chester J. LaRoche, QB
- Robert G. Lay
- Raymond B. Munger, T
- Joseph M. Neville, HB
- Sylvain L. Reinhardt, E
- Barclay Robinson, E
- George M. Sidenberg, G
- Storrs, E
- Trippe, G
- Arthur Vorys
- Leon B. Walker, T
- Harold W. S. Walters
- Frederick H. Webb, HB
- Edward K. Welles, E
- D. Welles, FB
- Philip Zenner
