= 1919 Holy Cross football team =

American college football season

1919 Holy Cross football
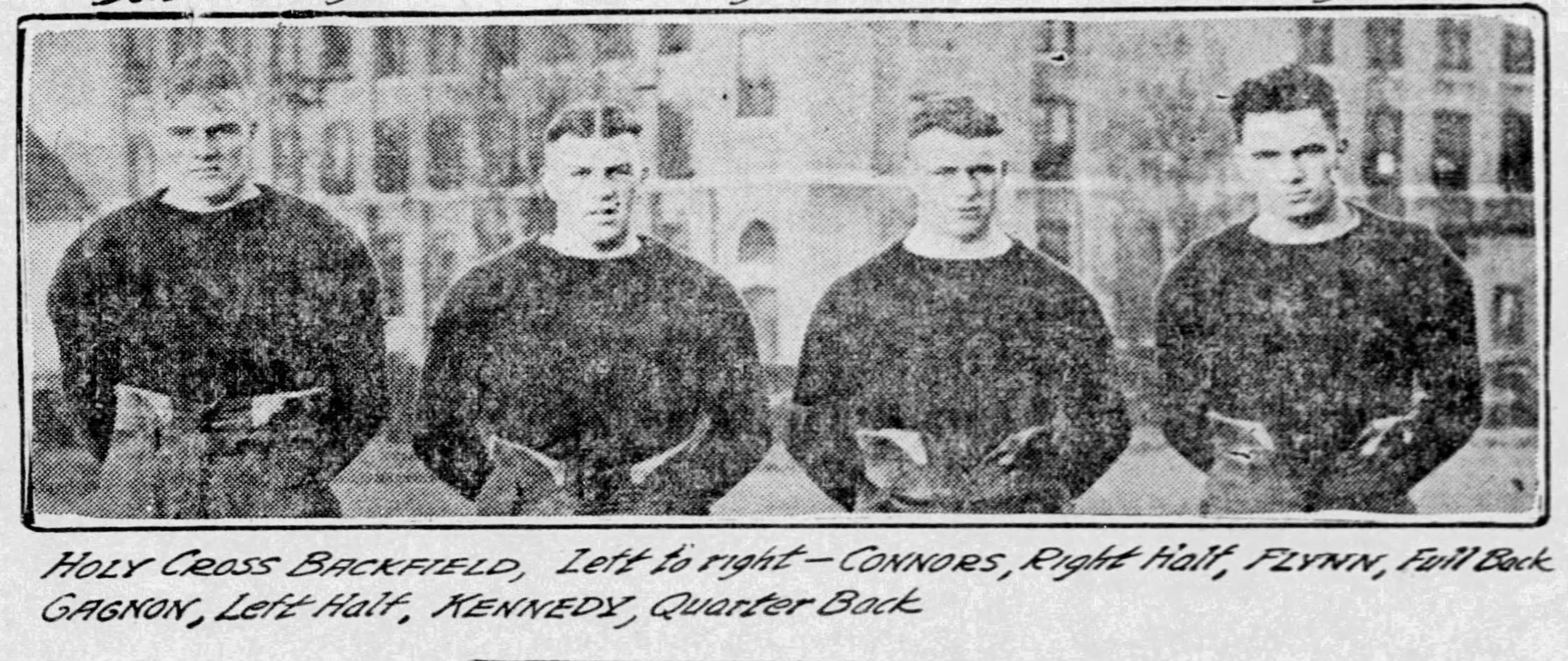
- 1919 Holy Cross backfield: Connors, Flynn, Gagnon and Kennedy
- Conference: Independent
- Record: 5–3
- Head coach: Cleo A. O'Donnell (1st season)
- Home stadium: Fitton Field

1919 Eastern college football independents records
	Conf.			Overall
Team	W	L	T	W		L		T
Harvard		–		9	–	0	–	1
Penn State		–		7	–	1	–	0
Swarthmore		–		7	–	1	–	0
Dartmouth		–		6	–	1	–	1
Colgate		–		5	–	1	–	1
New Hampshire		–		7	–	2	–	0
Lafayette		–		6	–	2	–	0
Washington & Jefferson		–		6	–	2	–	0
Williams		–		6	–	2	–	0
Syracuse		–		8	–	3	–	0
Penn		–		6	–	2	–	1
Pittsburgh		–		6	–	2	–	1
Lehigh		–		6	–	3	–	0
Princeton		–		4	–	2	–	1
Geneva		–		4	–	2	–	2
Army		–		6	–	3	–	0
Boston College		–		5	–	3	–	0
Holy Cross		–		5	–	3	–	0
Rutgers		–		5	–	3	–	0
Yale		–		5	–	3	–	0
Villanova		–		5	–	3	–	1
Brown		–		5	–	4	–	1
Bucknell		–		5	–	4	–	1
NYU		–		4	–	4	–	0
Carnegie Tech		–		3	–	4	–	0
Columbia		–		2	–	4	–	3
Cornell		–		3	–	5	–	0
Vermont		–		3	–	6	–	0
Franklin & Marshall		–		2	–	4	–	2
Tufts		–		2	–	5	–	0
Buffalo		–		0	–	5	–	1
Rhode Island State		–		0	–	8	–	1
Drexel		–		0	–	4	–	0

The 1919 Holy Cross football team was an American football team that represented the College of the Holy Cross as an independent during the 1919 college football season. In its first season under head coach Cleo A. O'Donnell, the team compiled a 5–3 record. The team played its home games at Fitton Field in Worcester, Massachusetts.

== Schedule ==
Date	Time	Opponent	Site	Result	Source
October 4		at Army	The Plain; West Point, NY	L 0–9	
October 11		Bowdoin	Fitton Field; Worcester, MA	W 14–0	
October 18		at Springfield	Pratt Field; Springfield, MA	W 7–0	
October 25		Connecticut	Fitton Field; Worcester, MA	W 69–0	
November 1		Rhode Island State	Fitton Field; Worcester, MA	W 29–3	
November 8		Colby	Fitton Field; Worcester, MA	W 41–0	
November 15	2:00 p.m.	vs. Boston College	Fenway Park; Boston, MA (rivalry)	L 7–9	
November 27		at Detroit	Navin Field; Detroit, MI	L 7–21	
All times are in Eastern time
