= 1919 Cornell Big Red football team =

American college football season

1919 Cornell Big Red football
- Conference: Independent
- Record: 3–5
- Head coach: John H. Rush (1st season)
- Captain: Fritz Shiverick
- Home stadium: Schoellkopf Field

1919 Eastern college football independents records
	Conf.			Overall
Team	W	L	T	W		L		T
Harvard		–		9	–	0	–	1
Penn State		–		7	–	1	–	0
Swarthmore		–		7	–	1	–	0
Dartmouth		–		6	–	1	–	1
Colgate		–		5	–	1	–	1
New Hampshire		–		7	–	2	–	0
Lafayette		–		6	–	2	–	0
Washington & Jefferson		–		6	–	2	–	0
Williams		–		6	–	2	–	0
Syracuse		–		8	–	3	–	0
Penn		–		6	–	2	–	1
Pittsburgh		–		6	–	2	–	1
Lehigh		–		6	–	3	–	0
Princeton		–		4	–	2	–	1
Geneva		–		4	–	2	–	2
Army		–		6	–	3	–	0
Boston College		–		5	–	3	–	0
Holy Cross		–		5	–	3	–	0
Rutgers		–		5	–	3	–	0
Yale		–		5	–	3	–	0
Villanova		–		5	–	3	–	1
Brown		–		5	–	4	–	1
Bucknell		–		5	–	4	–	1
NYU		–		4	–	4	–	0
Carnegie Tech		–		3	–	4	–	0
Columbia		–		2	–	4	–	3
Cornell		–		3	–	5	–	0
Vermont		–		3	–	6	–	0
Franklin & Marshall		–		2	–	4	–	2
Tufts		–		2	–	5	–	0
Buffalo		–		0	–	5	–	1
Rhode Island State		–		0	–	8	–	1
Drexel		–		0	–	4	–	0

The 1919 Cornell Big Red football team was an American football team that represented Cornell University during the 1919 college football season. In their first season under head coach John H. Rush, the Big Red compiled a 3–5 record and were outscored by their opponents by a combined total of 95 to 34.

== Schedule ==
Date	Opponent	Site	Result	Attendance	Source
October 4	Oberlin	Schoellkopf Field; Ithaca, NY	W 9–0		
October 11	Williams	Schoellkopf Field; Ithaca, NY	W 3–0		
October 18	Colgate	Schoellkopf Field; Ithaca, NY (rivalry)	L 0–21		
October 25	vs. Dartmouth	Polo Grounds; New York, NY (rivalry)	L 0–9		
November 1	Lafayette	Schoellkopf Field; Ithaca, NY	L 2–21		
November 8	Carnegie Tech	Schoellkopf Field; Ithaca, NY	W 20–0		
November 15	Penn State	Schoellkopf Field; Ithaca, NY	L 0–20		
November 27	at Penn	Franklin Field; Philadelphia, PA (rivalry)	L 0–24	25,000	
