= 1919 Syracuse Orangemen football team =

American college football season

1919 Syracuse Orangemen football
- Conference: Independent
- Record: 8–3
- Head coach: Frank "Buck" O'Neill (8th season)
- Captain: Harold Robertson
- Home stadium: Archbold Stadium

1919 Eastern college football independents records
	Conf.			Overall
Team	W	L	T	W		L		T
Harvard		–		9	–	0	–	1
Penn State		–		7	–	1	–	0
Swarthmore		–		7	–	1	–	0
Dartmouth		–		6	–	1	–	1
Colgate		–		5	–	1	–	1
New Hampshire		–		7	–	2	–	0
Lafayette		–		6	–	2	–	0
Washington & Jefferson		–		6	–	2	–	0
Williams		–		6	–	2	–	0
Syracuse		–		8	–	3	–	0
Penn		–		6	–	2	–	1
Pittsburgh		–		6	–	2	–	1
Lehigh		–		6	–	3	–	0
Princeton		–		4	–	2	–	1
Geneva		–		4	–	2	–	2
Army		–		6	–	3	–	0
Boston College		–		5	–	3	–	0
Holy Cross		–		5	–	3	–	0
Rutgers		–		5	–	3	–	0
Yale		–		5	–	3	–	0
Villanova		–		5	–	3	–	1
Brown		–		5	–	4	–	1
Bucknell		–		5	–	4	–	1
NYU		–		4	–	4	–	0
Carnegie Tech		–		3	–	4	–	0
Columbia		–		2	–	4	–	3
Cornell		–		3	–	5	–	0
Vermont		–		3	–	6	–	0
Franklin & Marshall		–		2	–	4	–	2
Tufts		–		2	–	5	–	0
Buffalo		–		0	–	5	–	1
Rhode Island State		–		0	–	8	–	1
Drexel		–		0	–	4	–	0

The 1919 Syracuse Orangemen football team represented Syracuse University as an independent during the 1919 college football season.

== Schedule ==
Date	Opponent	Site	Result	Attendance	Source
September 27	All-Syracuse	Archbold Stadium; Syracuse, NY	W 18–0		
October 4	Vermont	Archbold Stadium; Syracuse, NY	W 27–0	5,000	
October 11	at Army	The Plain; West Point, NY	W 7–3		
October 18	Pittsburgh	Archbold Stadium; Syracuse, NY (rivalry)	W 24–3	15,000–18,000	
October 25	Washington & Jefferson	Archbold Stadium; Syracuse, NY	L 0–13	8,500	
November 1	at Brown	Andrews Field; Providence, RI	W 13–0		
November 4	vs. Rutgers	Polo Grounds; New York, NY	W 14–0	12,000	
November 8	Bucknell	Archbold Stadium; Syracuse, NY	W 9–0		
November 15	Colgate	Archbold Stadium; Syracuse, NY (rivalry)	W 13–7	30,000	
November 22	at Indiana	Jordan Field; Bloomington, IN	L 6–12	8,000	
November 27	at Nebraska	Nebraska Field; Lincoln, NE	L 0–3	15,000	
