= 1919 Rhode Island State football team =

American college football season

1919 Rhode Island State football
- Conference: Independent
- Record: 0–7–1
- Head coach: Fred Murray (1st season)

1919 Eastern college football independents records
	Conf.			Overall
Team	W	L	T	W		L		T
Harvard		–		9	–	0	–	1
Penn State		–		7	–	1	–	0
Swarthmore		–		7	–	1	–	0
Dartmouth		–		6	–	1	–	1
Colgate		–		5	–	1	–	1
New Hampshire		–		7	–	2	–	0
Lafayette		–		6	–	2	–	0
Washington & Jefferson		–		6	–	2	–	0
Williams		–		6	–	2	–	0
Syracuse		–		8	–	3	–	0
Penn		–		6	–	2	–	1
Pittsburgh		–		6	–	2	–	1
Lehigh		–		6	–	3	–	0
Princeton		–		4	–	2	–	1
Geneva		–		4	–	2	–	2
Army		–		6	–	3	–	0
Boston College		–		5	–	3	–	0
Holy Cross		–		5	–	3	–	0
Rutgers		–		5	–	3	–	0
Yale		–		5	–	3	–	0
Villanova		–		5	–	3	–	1
Brown		–		5	–	4	–	1
Bucknell		–		5	–	4	–	1
NYU		–		4	–	4	–	0
Carnegie Tech		–		3	–	4	–	0
Columbia		–		2	–	4	–	3
Cornell		–		3	–	5	–	0
Vermont		–		3	–	6	–	0
Franklin & Marshall		–		2	–	4	–	2
Tufts		–		2	–	5	–	0
Buffalo		–		0	–	5	–	1
Rhode Island State		–		0	–	8	–	1
Drexel		–		0	–	4	–	0

The 1919 Rhode Island football team was an American football team that represented Rhode Island State College (later renamed the University of Rhode Island) as an independent during the 1919 college football season. In its first and only season under head coach Fred Murray, the team compiled a 0–7–1 record and was outscored by a total of 168 to 31.

== Schedule ==
Date	Opponent	Site	Result	Source
September 27	at Brown	Andrews Field; Providence, RI (rivalry)	L 0–27	
October 11	at Wesleyan	Andrus Field; Middletown, CT	L 0–35	
October 18	at Boston University	Boston, MA	L 6–14	
October 25	at Stevens	Hoboken, NJ	L 2–31	
November 1	at Holy Cross	Fitton Field; Worcester, MA	L 3–29	
November 8	Massachusetts	Kingston, RI	L 11–19	
November 15	at Worcester Tech	Worcester, MA	T 6–6	
November 22	Connecticut	Kingston, RI (rivalry)	L 3–7	
