= 1919 Army Cadets football team =

American college football season

1919 Army Cadets football
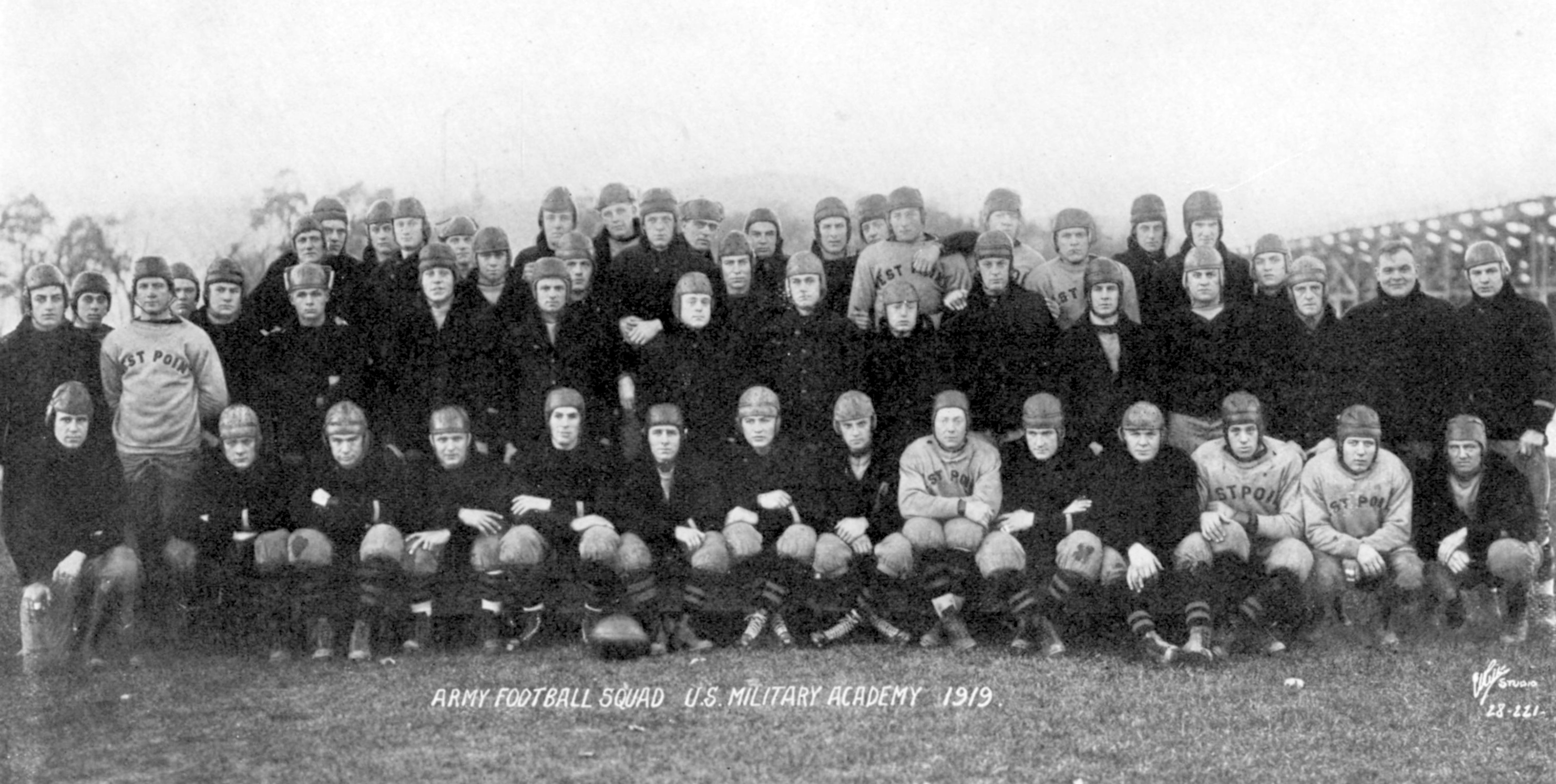
- Conference: Independent
- Record: 6–3
- Head coach: Charles Dudley Daly (5th season)
- Captain: Alexander George
- Home stadium: The Plain

1919 Eastern college football independents records
	Conf.			Overall
Team	W	L	T	W		L		T
Harvard		–		9	–	0	–	1
Penn State		–		7	–	1	–	0
Swarthmore		–		7	–	1	–	0
Dartmouth		–		6	–	1	–	1
Colgate		–		5	–	1	–	1
New Hampshire		–		7	–	2	–	0
Lafayette		–		6	–	2	–	0
Washington & Jefferson		–		6	–	2	–	0
Williams		–		6	–	2	–	0
Syracuse		–		8	–	3	–	0
Penn		–		6	–	2	–	1
Pittsburgh		–		6	–	2	–	1
Lehigh		–		6	–	3	–	0
Princeton		–		4	–	2	–	1
Geneva		–		4	–	2	–	2
Army		–		6	–	3	–	0
Boston College		–		5	–	3	–	0
Holy Cross		–		5	–	3	–	0
Rutgers		–		5	–	3	–	0
Yale		–		5	–	3	–	0
Villanova		–		5	–	3	–	1
Brown		–		5	–	4	–	1
Bucknell		–		5	–	4	–	1
NYU		–		4	–	4	–	0
Carnegie Tech		–		3	–	4	–	0
Columbia		–		2	–	4	–	3
Cornell		–		3	–	5	–	0
Vermont		–		3	–	6	–	0
Franklin & Marshall		–		2	–	4	–	2
Tufts		–		2	–	5	–	0
Buffalo		–		0	–	5	–	1
Rhode Island State		–		0	–	8	–	1
Drexel		–		0	–	4	–	0

The 1919 Army Cadets football team represented the United States Military Academy as an independent during the 1919 college football season. In their fifth non-consecutive season under head coach Charles Dudley Daly (Daly was Army's coach from 1913 to 1916), the Cadets compiled a 6–3 record, shut out five of their nine opponents, and outscored all opponents 140 to 38.

In the annual Army–Navy Game at the Polo Grounds in New York City, the Cadets lost to the Midshipmen 6–0. Army defeated Villanova by a lopsided 62 to 0 score, but lost to Notre Dame 12–9.

End Earl Blaik was selected by Walter Camp as a third-team player on the All-America Team.

== Schedule ==
Date	Opponent	Site	Result	Source
September 27	Middlebury	The Plain; West Point, NY	W 14–0	
October 4	Holy Cross	The Plain; West Point, NY	W 9–0	
October 11	Syracuse	The Plain; West Point, NY	L 3–7	
October 18	Maine	The Plain; West Point, NY	W 6–0	
October 25	Boston College	The Plain; West Point, NY	W 13–0	
November 1	Tufts	The Plain; West Point, NY	W 24–13	
November 8	Notre Dame	The Plain; West Point, NY (rivalry)	L 9–12	
November 15	Villanova	The Plain; West Point, NY	W 62–0	
November 29	vs. Navy	Polo Grounds; New York, NY (Army–Navy Game)	L 0–6	

== Roster ==
- Earl Blaik
