= John Rush (cricketer) =

Australian cricketer

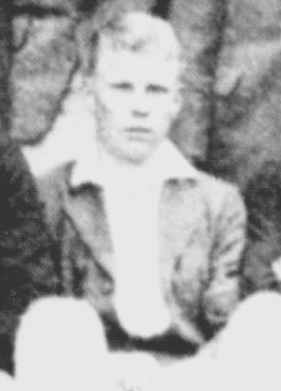

Personal information
- Born: 5 April 1910; Melbourne, Australia
- Died: 13 January 1982 (aged 71); Adelaide, Australia

Domestic team information
- Years: Team
- 1931: Victoria
- Source: Cricinfo, 22 November 2015

John Rush (5 April 1910 – 13 January 1982) was an Australian cricketer. He played two first-class cricket matches for Victoria in 1931.

== See also ==
- List of Victoria first-class cricketers
