= 1919 college football season =

American college football season

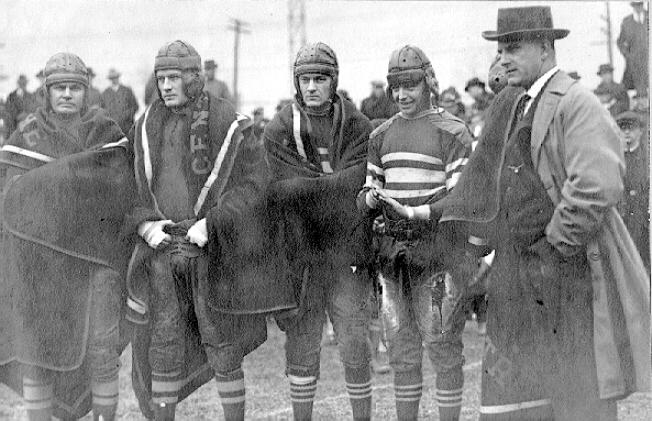
- Centre after its defeat of West Virginia
- Number of bowls: 1
- Champion(s): Harvard; Illinois; Texas A&M

The 1919 college football season had no clear-cut champion, with the Official NCAA Division I Football Records Book listing Centre, Harvard, Illinois, Notre Dame, and Texas A&M as having been deemed national champions by major selectors. Only Harvard, Illinois, and Texas A&M claim national championships for the 1919 season. Texas A&M began claiming the 1919 national championship in 2012.

== Conference and program changes ==
=== Conference memberships ===
School	1918 conference	1919 conference
Bowling Green State Normal Normals	Program Established	Independent
Grinnell Pioneers	Independent	Missouri Valley
Nebraska Cornhuskers	Missouri Valley	Independent
Stanford Indians	Independent	PCC
Southern Branch Bruins	Program Established	Independent
Washington State Cougars	Independent	PCC

=== Program changes ===
- University of Washington football officially adopted the Sun Dodgers nickname.
- State College of Washington (Washington State) football officially adopted the Cougars nickname.

== Rose Bowl ==
Harvard defeated Oregon, 7–6, in the 1920 Rose Bowl.

== Conference standings ==
=== Major conference standings ===
1919 Big Ten Conference football standings
	Conf.					Overall
Team	W		L		T	W		L		T
Illinois $	6	–	1	–	0	6	–	1	–	0
Ohio State	3	–	1	–	0	6	–	1	–	0
Chicago	4	–	2	–	0	5	–	2	–	0
Wisconsin	3	–	2	–	0	5	–	2	–	0
Minnesota	3	–	2	–	0	4	–	2	–	1
Iowa	2	–	2	–	0	5	–	2	–	0
Michigan	1	–	4	–	0	3	–	4	–	0
Northwestern	1	–	4	–	0	2	–	5	–	0
Indiana	0	–	2	–	0	3	–	4	–	0
Purdue	0	–	3	–	0	2	–	4	–	1
$ – Conference champion

1919 Missouri Valley Conference football standings
	Conf.					Overall
Team	W		L		T	W		L		T
Missouri $	4	–	0	–	1	5	–	1	–	2
Iowa State	3	–	1	–	1	5	–	2	–	1
Washington University	2	–	2	–	0	5	–	2	–	0
Drake	2	–	2	–	0	4	–	3	–	0
Kansas	1	–	1	–	1	3	–	2	–	3
Kansas State	0	–	3	–	1	3	–	5	–	1
Grinnell	0	–	3	–	0	1	–	4	–	1
$ – Conference champion

1919 Northwest Conference football standings
	Conf.					Overall
Team	W		L		T	W		L		T
Washington State	3	–	1	–	0	5	–	2	–	0
Oregon	2	–	1	–	0	5	–	2	–	0
Oregon Agricultural	1	–	1	–	0	4	–	4	–	0
Idaho	1	–	2	–	0	2	–	3	–	0
Montana	0	–	2	–	1	2	–	3	–	2
Whitman	0	–	0	–	1	0	–	2	–	1

1919 Pacific Coast Conference football standings
	Conf.					Overall
Team	W		L		T	W		L		T
Oregon ^ +	2	–	1	–	0	5	–	2	–	0
Washington +	2	–	1	–	0	5	–	1	–	0
California	2	–	2	–	0	6	–	2	–	1
Washington State	2	–	2	–	0	5	–	2	–	0
Stanford	1	–	1	–	0	4	–	3	–	0
Oregon Agricultural	1	–	3	–	0	4	–	4	–	1
+ – Conference co-champions; ^ – Selected as Rose Bowl representative

1919 Rocky Mountain Conference football standings
	Conf.					Overall
Team	W		L		T	W		L		T
Colorado Agricultural $	7	–	1	–	0	7	–	1	–	0
Utah	4	–	1	–	0	5	–	2	–	0
Colorado College	3	–	1	–	1	4	–	2	–	1
Utah Agricultural	3	–	2	–	0	5	–	2	–	0
Wyoming †	3	–	3	–	0	3	–	5	–	0
Colorado	2	–	3	–	1	2	–	3	–	1
Denver	0	–	4	–	1	1	–	5	–	1
Colorado Mines	0	–	4	–	1	0	–	4	–	3
Montana State †	0	–	3	–	0	1	–	3	–	1
$ – Conference champion; † Ineligible for conference title

1919 South Atlantic Intercollegiate Athletic Association football standings
	Conf.					Overall
Team	W		L		T	W		L		T
Georgetown $	2	–	0	–	0	7	–	3	–	0
Maryland State	4	–	1	–	0	5	–	4	–	0
NC State	3	–	1	–	0	7	–	2	–	0
North Carolina	3	–	1	–	0	4	–	3	–	1
Washington and Lee	2	–	1	–	0	8	–	1	–	0
VMI	4	–	2	–	0	6	–	2	–	0
Richmond	2	–	2	–	1	5	–	2	–	2
Virginia	1	–	1	–	1	2	–	5	–	2
VPI	2	–	4	–	0	5	–	4	–	0
William & Mary	1	–	3	–	0	2	–	6	–	1
Catholic University	0	–	1	–	0	1	–	6	–	1
St. John's (MD)	0	–	1	–	0	0	–	1	–	0
Johns Hopkins	0	–	1	–	0	0	–	2	–	0
Davidson	0	–	4	–	0	4	–	6	–	1
$ – Conference champion

1919 Southern Intercollegiate Athletic Association football standings
	Conf.					Overall
Team	W		L		T	W		L		T
Auburn $	5	–	1	–	0	8	–	1	–	0
Alabama	6	–	1	–	0	8	–	1	–	0
Centre	1	–	0	–	0	9	–	0	–	0
Kentucky	3	–	1	–	1	3	–	4	–	1
Georgia Tech	3	–	1	–	0	7	–	3	–	0
Tulane	3	–	1	–	1	6	–	2	–	1
Vanderbilt	3	–	1	–	2	5	–	1	–	2
Furman	2	–	1	–	1	6	–	2	–	1
Mississippi A&M	5	–	2	–	0	6	–	2	–	0
Georgia	4	–	2	–	2	4	–	2	–	3
LSU	3	–	2	–	0	6	–	2	–	0
Clemson	3	–	2	–	2	6	–	2	–	2
Florida	2	–	2	–	0	5	–	3	–	0
Wofford	1	–	1	–	0	3	–	2	–	1
Transylvania	1	–	1	–	0	2	–	4	–	0
Ole Miss	1	–	4	–	0	4	–	4	–	0
The Citadel	1	–	4	–	0	4	–	4	–	1
Sewanee	1	–	4	–	0	3	–	6	–	0
Georgetown (KY)	0	–	0	–	0	0	–	2	–	0
Tennessee	0	–	3	–	2	3	–	3	–	3
South Carolina	0	–	4	–	1	1	–	7	–	1
Mercer	0	–	1	–	0	0	–	2	–	0
Mississippi College	0	–	4	–	0	3	–	5	–	1
Howard (AL)	0	–	4	–	0	3	–	5	–	2
$ – Conference champion

1919 Southwest Conference football standings
	Conf.					Overall
Team	W		L		T	W		L		T
Texas A&M $	4	–	0	–	0	10	–	0	–	0
Rice	3	–	1	–	0	8	–	1	–	0
Oklahoma	2	–	1	–	0	5	–	2	–	3
Texas	3	–	2	–	0	6	–	3	–	0
Arkansas	1	–	2	–	0	3	–	4	–	0
SMU	0	–	2	–	1	5	–	4	–	1
Oklahoma A&M	0	–	2	–	0	3	–	3	–	2
Baylor	0	–	3	–	1	5	–	3	–	1
$ – Conference champion

=== Independents ===
1919 Eastern college football independents records
	Conf.			Overall
Team	W	L	T	W		L		T
Harvard		–		9	–	0	–	1
Penn State		–		7	–	1	–	0
Swarthmore		–		7	–	1	–	0
Dartmouth		–		6	–	1	–	1
Colgate		–		5	–	1	–	1
New Hampshire		–		7	–	2	–	0
Lafayette		–		6	–	2	–	0
Washington & Jefferson		–		6	–	2	–	0
Williams		–		6	–	2	–	0
Syracuse		–		8	–	3	–	0
Penn		–		6	–	2	–	1
Pittsburgh		–		6	–	2	–	1
Lehigh		–		6	–	3	–	0
Princeton		–		4	–	2	–	1
Geneva		–		4	–	2	–	2
Army		–		6	–	3	–	0
Boston College		–		5	–	3	–	0
Holy Cross		–		5	–	3	–	0
Rutgers		–		5	–	3	–	0
Yale		–		5	–	3	–	0
Villanova		–		5	–	3	–	1
Brown		–		5	–	4	–	1
Bucknell		–		5	–	4	–	1
NYU		–		4	–	4	–	0
Carnegie Tech		–		3	–	4	–	0
Columbia		–		2	–	4	–	3
Cornell		–		3	–	5	–	0
Vermont		–		3	–	6	–	0
Franklin & Marshall		–		2	–	4	–	2
Tufts		–		2	–	5	–	0
Buffalo		–		0	–	5	–	1
Rhode Island State		–		0	–	8	–	1
Drexel		–		0	–	4	–	0

1919 Midwestern college football independents records
	Conf.			Overall
Team	W	L	T	W		L		T
Notre Dame		–		9	–	0	–	0
Lincoln (MO)		–		3	–	0	–	0
Detroit		–		8	–	1	–	0
Western State Normal		–		4	–	1	–	0
Akron		–		6	–	1	–	1
North Dakota Agricultural		–		5	–	1	–	1
Haskell		–		8	–	2	–	1
Marquette		–		5	–	1	–	2
St. Xavier		–		6	–	2	–	0
Morningside		–		6	–	2	–	0
Heidelberg		–		6	–	3	–	0
Saint Louis		–		4	–	2	–	2
Valparaiso		–		5	–	3	–	0
Wabash		–		4	–	3	–	2
Central Michigan		–		2	–	2	–	3
Michigan Agricultural		–		4	–	4	–	1
Nebraska		–		3	–	3	–	2
St. Mary's (OH)		–		2	–	2	–	0
Iowa State Teachers		–		2	–	4	–	1
Toledo		–		2	–	4	–	0
Butler		–		0	–	5	–	1
Bowling Green		–		0	–	3	–	0

1919 Southern college football independents records
	Conf.			Overall
Team	W	L	T	W		L		T
Marshall		–		8	–	0	–	0
Southern College		–		5	–	0	–	0
Middle Tennessee State Normal		–		4	–	0	–	0
Phillips		–		10	–	0	–	1
Navy		–		7	–	1	–	0
West Virginia		–		8	–	2	–	0
Mississippi Normal		–		4	–	1	–	2
Presbyterian		–		4	–	3	–	2
North Texas State Normal		–		5	–	3	–	0
Birmingham–Southern		–		4	–	3	–	0
Abilene Christian		–		2	–	2	–	0
Southwest Texas State		–		4	–	4	–	0
Spring Hill		–		3	–	3	–	1
Stetson		–		4	–	4	–	0
West Tennessee State Normal		–		3	–	4	–	0
Chattanooga		–		3	–	5	–	1
Marion		–		3	–	6	–	0
Texas Mines		–		2	–	4	–	0
Delaware		–		2	–	5	–	1
Oglethorpe		–		2	–	6	–	1
Wake Forest		–		2	–	6	–	0
Sam Houston Normal		–		0	–	7	–	0

1919 Western college football independents records
	Conf.			Overall
Team	W	L	T	W		L		T
Hawaii		–		4	–	0	–	1
Arizona		–		7	–	1	–	0
Nevada		–		8	–	1	–	1
New Mexico		–		3	–	0	–	2
USC		–		4	–	1	–	0
Saint Mary's		–		3	–	3	–	1
New Mexico A&M		–		2	–	3	–	1
Gonzaga		–		2	–	3	–	0
Santa Clara		–		2	–	4	–	0
University Farm		–		2	–	5	–	0
South Branch		–		2	–	6	–	0
Pacific (CA)		–		1	–	4	–	0
Tempe Normal		–		0	–	2	–	0

=== Minor conferences ===
Conference	Champion(s)	Record
Central Intercollegiate Athletics Association	No champion	—
Indiana Intercollegiate Athletic League	Wabash College	4–0–1
Inter-Normal Athletic Conference of Wisconsin	La Crosse Normal	—
Kansas Collegiate Athletic Conference	College of Emporia	—
Louisiana Intercollegiate Athletic Association	Unknown	—
Michigan Intercollegiate Athletic Association	Kalamazoo	3–0
Nebraska Intercollegiate Conference	Unknown	—
Ohio Athletic Conference	Wooster	7–0
Oklahoma Intercollegiate Conference	Kendall	5–0–1
Southern California Intercollegiate Athletic Conference	Pomona	4–0
Southern Intercollegiate Athletic Conference	Fisk	—

=== Minor conference standings ===
1919 Colored Intercollegiate Athletic Association football standings
	Conf.					Overall
Team	W		L		T	W		L		T
Lincoln (PA)	2	–	0	–	1	2	–	0	–	1
Howard	2	–	0	–	1	5	–	0	–	3
Virginia Union	1	–	1	–	0	5	–	1	–	1
Hampton	0	–	2	–	0	3	–	2	–	1
Shaw	0	–	2	–	0	1	–	2	–	0

1919 Illinois Intercollegiate Athletic Conference football standings
	Conf.					Overall
Team	W		L		T	W		L		T
Carthage	3	–	2	–	0	5	–	3	–	0
Southern Illinois			–			4	–	3	–	1

1919 Kansas Collegiate Athletic Conference football standings
	Conf.					Overall
Team	W		L		T	W		L		T
College of Emporia $	8	–	0	–	0	8	–	0	–	0
Pittsburg Normal	5	–	0	–	1	7	–	2	–	1
Washburn	7	–	1	–	0	7	–	1	–	1
Southwestern (KS)	6	–	3	–	0	6	–	4	–	0
St. Mary's (KS)	3	–	2	–	0	6	–	2	–	0
Baker	3	–	2	–	1	4	–	4	–	1
Friends	3	–	4	–	0	4	–	5	–	0
Hays Normal	3	–	4	–	0	3	–	6	–	0
Kansas Wesleyan	2	–	4	–	0	3	–	5	–	0
Ottawa	2	–	4	–	2	2	–	4	–	2
Bethany (KS)	2	–	5	–	1	2	–	5	–	1
Fairmount	2	–	6	–	2	2	–	6	–	2
Kansas State Normal	1	–	4	–	2	1	–	6	–	2
Cooper	0	–	8	–	1	0	–	8	–	1
$ – Conference champion

1919 Missouri Intercollegiate Athletic Association football standings
	Conf.					Overall
Team	W		L		T	W		L		T
Missouri Wesleyan $	8	–	0	–	0	10	–	0	–	0
Drury	2	–	0	–	1	4	–	2	–	1
William Jewell	3	–	1	–	1	5	–	4	–	2
Central (MO)	3	–	2	–	0	4	–	3	–	0
Tarkio	2	–	2	–	1	4	–	2	–	1
Kirksville	2	–	2	–	2	3	–	2	–	2
Springfield (MO)	2	–	2	–	0	3	–	4	–	0
Rolla	2	–	2	–	0	3	–	5	–	0
Cape Girardeau	1	–	1	–	0	2	–	4	–	0
Warrensburg	2	–	4	–	1	2	–	6	–	1
Westminster (MO)	1	–	5	–	0	1	–	6	–	0
Maryville (MO)	0	–	3	–	0	0	–	4	–	0
Missouri Valley	0	–	3	–	0	0	–	5	–	0
$ – Conference champion

1919 Missouri Valley Conference for Black Schools football standings
	Conf.					Overall
Team	W		L		T	W		L		T
Lincoln (MO) $	3	–	0	–	0	3	–	0	–	0
Columbia Athletics	0	–	0	–	0	1	–	0	–	0
Sumner HS (MO)	0	–	1	–	0	0	–	1	–	0
Lincoln HS (MO)	0	–	1	–	0	0	–	1	–	0
East St. Louis Lincoln HS (IL)	0	–	1	–	0	0	–	1	–	0
Western University (KS)			–			0	–	0	–	0
George R. Smith			–			0	–	0	–	0
Topeka Industrial Institute			–			0	–	0	–	0
$ – Conference champion

1919 Nebraska Intercollegiate Conference football standings
	Conf.					Overall
Team	W		L		T	W		L		T
York (NE) $	6	–	0	–	0	6	–	0	–	0
Nebraska Wesleyan	6	–	1	–	0	7	–	2	–	0
Peru Normal	4	–	2	–	0	5	–	2	–	0
Hastings	2	–	1	–	0	?	–	?	–	?
Cotner	2	–	4	–	0	?	–	?	–	?
Midland	2	–	4	–	0	2	–	4	–	0
Doane	1	–	4	–	0	2	–	5	–	1
Kearney Normal	1	–	4	–	0	?	–	?	–	?
Nebraska Central	0	–	4	–	0	0	–	4	–	0
$ – Conference champion

1919 Ohio Athletic Conference football standings
	Conf.					Overall
Team	W		L		T	W		L		T
Wooster $	7	–	0	–	0	8	–	0	–	0
Oberlin	5	–	0	–	0	7	–	1	–	0
Ohio State	2	–	0	–	0	6	–	1	–	0
Miami (OH)	7	–	1	–	0	7	–	1	–	0
Wittenberg	3	–	0	–	2	6	–	0	–	2
Akron	5	–	1	–	1	6	–	1	–	1
Denison	4	–	2	–	1	6	–	2	–	1
Western Reserve	3	–	3	–	0	5	–	4	–	0
Ohio Wesleyan	3	–	3	–	0	4	–	4	–	0
Case	2	–	4	–	1	3	–	6	–	1
Ohio	2	–	4	–	0	3	–	5	–	0
Cincinnati	1	–	3	–	1	3	–	4	–	1
Mount Union	0	–	5	–	0	1	–	7	–	0
Ohio Northern	0	–	6	–	0	1	–	8	–	0
Baldwin–Wallace	0	–	5	–	0	0	–	8	–	0
Kenyon	0	–	7	–	0	0	–	7	–	0
$ – Conference champion

1919 Southern California Conference football standings
	Conf.					Overall
Team	W		L		T	W		L		T
Pomona $	4	–	0	–	0	5	–	1	–	0
Occidental	3	–	1	–	0	3	–	4	–	0
Throop	2	–	2	–	0	6	–	3	–	0
Redlands	1	–	3	–	0	3	–	4	–	1
Whittier	0	–	4	–	0	0	–	5	–	0
$ – Conference champion

1919 Texas Intercollegiate Athletic Association football standings
	Conf.					Overall
Team	W		L		T	W		L		T
Texas A&M $	7	–	0	–	0	10	–	0	–	0
Rice	6	–	1	–	0	8	–	1	–	0
Texas	4	–	1	–	0	6	–	4	–	0
Baylor	3	–	3	–	1	5	–	3	–	1
Howard Payne	2	–	3	–	0	6	–	3	–	0
Austin	2	–	3	–	0	4	–	3	–	1
SMU	2	–	4	–	1	5	–	4	–	1
Southwestern (TX)	2	–	5	–	0	3	–	5	–	0
TCU	1	–	4	–	0	1	–	7	–	0
Trinity (TX)	0	–	5	–	0	2	–	6	–	0
$ – Conference champion

1919 Wisconsin Normal Athletic Conference football standings
	Conf.					Overall
Team	W		L		T	W		L		T
La Crosse Normal $	3	–	0	–	1	6	–	2	–	1
Oshkosh Normal	4	–	1	–	0	5	–	1	–	0
River Falls Normal	3	–	1	–	1	5	–	3	–	1
Milwaukee Normal	2	–	1	–	1	5	–	1	–	1
Eau Claire Normal	2	–	1	–	1	3	–	1	–	1
Stevens Point Normal	2	–	2	–	1	2	–	3	–	1
Whitewater Normal	1	–	2	–	0	3	–	4	–	0
Superior Normal	0	–	2	–	1	2	–	2	–	1
Stout Normal	0	–	3	–	0	2	–	3	–	0
Platteville Normal	0	–	4	–	0	1	–	5	–	1
Championship: La Crosse Normal 14, River Falls Normal 0
$ – Conference champion

== Awards and honors ==
=== All-Americans ===
The consensus All-America team included:

Position	Name	Height	Weight (lbs.)	Class	Hometown	Team
QB	Bo McMillin	5'9"	165	So.	Fort Worth, Texas	Centre
QB	Benny Boynton	5'9"	163	Sr.	Waco, Texas	Williams
HB	Chic Harley	5'11"	171	Sr.	Chicago, Illinois	Ohio State
HB	Eddie Casey	5'10"	155	Sr.	Natick, Massachusetts	Harvard
FB	Ira Rodgers	5'10"	203	Sr.	Bethany, West Virginia	West Virginia
E	Bob Higgins			Sr.	Corning, New York	Penn State
E	Heinie Miller	5'10"	185	Sr.	Williamsport, Pennsylvania	Penn
T	Pete Henry	5'10"	230	Sr.	Mansfield, Ohio	Washington & Jefferson
G	Doc Alexander	5'11"	210	Jr.	Silver Creek, New York	Syracuse
C	Red Weaver	5'10"	185	Jr.	Garland, Texas	Centre
C	Charles Carpenter			Sr.	Hartland, Wisconsin	Wisconsin
G	Swede Youngstrom	6'1"	187	Sr.	Waltham, Massachusetts	Dartmouth
T	Belford West	6'2"	195	Sr.	Hamilton, New York	Colgate
E	Lester Belding			So.	Mason City, Iowa	Iowa

== Statistical leaders ==
- Team scoring most points: Centre, 485
- Player scoring most points: Ira Rodgers, West Virginia, 147
- Total offense leader: George Gipp, Notre Dame, 1456
- Passing yards leader: George Gipp, 727
- Passing touchdowns leader: Ira Rodgers, 11
- Receptions leader: Bernard Kirk, Notre Dame, 21
- Receiving yards leader: Bernard Kirk, 372
