= McCasland =

McCasland is a surname. Notable people with the surname include:

- Cameron McCasland (born 1981), American film director
- Grant McCasland (born 1976), American basketball coach
- Neil McCasland, retired United States Air Force Major General
- Vernon McCasland (1896–1970), American football coach

== See also ==
- McCasland Field House, building at the University of Oklahoma, United States
