= 1919 West Virginia Mountaineers football team =

American college football season

1919 West Virginia Mountaineers football
- Conference: Independent
- Record: 8–2
- Head coach: Mont McIntire (3rd season)
- Captain: Ira Rodgers

1919 Southern college football independents records
| | Conf. | | | Overall |
| Team | W | L | T | W | | L | | T |
|---|---|---|---|---|---|---|---|---|
| Marshall | | – | | 8 | – | 0 | – | 0 |
| Southern College | | – | | 5 | – | 0 | – | 0 |
| Middle Tennessee State Normal | | – | | 4 | – | 0 | – | 0 |
| Phillips | | – | | 10 | – | 0 | – | 1 |
| Navy | | – | | 7 | – | 1 | – | 0 |
| West Virginia | | – | | 8 | – | 2 | – | 0 |
| Mississippi Normal | | – | | 4 | – | 1 | – | 2 |
| Presbyterian | | – | | 4 | – | 3 | – | 2 |
| North Texas State Normal | | – | | 5 | – | 3 | – | 0 |
| Birmingham–Southern | | – | | 4 | – | 3 | – | 0 |
| Abilene Christian | | – | | 2 | – | 2 | – | 0 |
| Southwest Texas State | | – | | 4 | – | 4 | – | 0 |
| Spring Hill | | – | | 3 | – | 3 | – | 1 |
| Stetson | | – | | 4 | – | 4 | – | 0 |
| West Tennessee State Normal | | – | | 3 | – | 4 | – | 0 |
| Chattanooga | | – | | 3 | – | 5 | – | 1 |
| Marion | | – | | 3 | – | 6 | – | 0 |
| Texas Mines | | – | | 2 | – | 4 | – | 0 |
| Delaware | | – | | 2 | – | 5 | – | 1 |
| Oglethorpe | | – | | 2 | – | 6 | – | 1 |
| Wake Forest | | – | | 2 | – | 6 | – | 0 |
| Sam Houston Normal | | – | | 0 | – | 7 | – | 0 |

The 1919 West Virginia Mountaineers football team represented the West Virginia Mountaineers during the 1919 college football season. The Mountaineers completed the regular season with an 8–2 record.

As a senior, in 1919, Ira Rodgers had one of the greatest seasons of any player from WVU. Rodgers led the nation in scoring with 147 points on 19 touchdowns and 33 extra-point kicks. He also threw 11 touchdown passes, which was a rare feat for that era and a WVU record until 1949. Rodgers earned consensus All-American honors that season, the first All-American in WVU history.

== Schedule ==
| Date | Opponent | Site | Result | Attendance | Source |
|---|---|---|---|---|---|
| September 27 | Marietta | WVU Athletic Field; Morgantown, WV | W 61–0 | | |
| October 4 | Westminster (PA) | WVU Athletic Field; Morgantown, WV | W 55–0 | | |
| October 11 | at Pittsburgh | Forbes Field; Pittsburgh, PA (rivalry) | L 0–26 | 20,000 | |
| October 18 | Maryland State | WVU Athletic Field; Morgantown, WV | W 27–0 | | |
| October 25 | vs. Bethany (WV) | Wheeling, WV | W 60–0 | | |
| November 1 | at Princeton | Palmer Stadium; Princeton, NJ | W 25–0 | | |
| November 8 | vs. Centre | Laidley Field; Charleston, WV | L 6–14 | | |
| November 15 | at Rutgers | Neilson Field; New Brunswick, NJ | W 30–7 | | |
| November 22 | Ohio Wesleyan | WVU Athletic Field; Morgantown, WV | W 55–6 | | |
| November 27 | Washington & Jefferson | WVU Athletic Field; Morgantown, WV | W 7–0 | | |
