= 1919 Middle Tennessee State Normal football team =

American college football season

1919 Middle Tennessee State Normal football
- Conference: Independent
- Record: 4–0
- Head coach: Alfred B. Miles (5th season)
- Captain: Rupert Smith

1919 Southern college football independents records
	Conf.			Overall
Team	W	L	T	W		L		T
Marshall		–		8	–	0	–	0
Southern College		–		5	–	0	–	0
Middle Tennessee State Normal		–		4	–	0	–	0
Phillips		–		10	–	0	–	1
Navy		–		7	–	1	–	0
West Virginia		–		8	–	2	–	0
Mississippi Normal		–		4	–	1	–	2
Presbyterian		–		4	–	3	–	2
North Texas State Normal		–		5	–	3	–	0
Birmingham–Southern		–		4	–	3	–	0
Abilene Christian		–		2	–	2	–	0
Southwest Texas State		–		4	–	4	–	0
Spring Hill		–		3	–	3	–	1
Stetson		–		4	–	4	–	0
West Tennessee State Normal		–		3	–	4	–	0
Chattanooga		–		3	–	5	–	1
Marion		–		3	–	6	–	0
Texas Mines		–		2	–	4	–	0
Delaware		–		2	–	5	–	1
Oglethorpe		–		2	–	6	–	1
Wake Forest		–		2	–	6	–	0
Sam Houston Normal		–		0	–	7	–	0

The 1919 Middle Tennessee State Normal football team represented the Middle Tennessee State Normal School (now known as Middle Tennessee State University) during the 1919 college football season. The team captain was Rupert Smith.

== Schedule ==
Date	Time	Opponent	Site	Result	Source
		Vanderbilt School of Medicine	Murfreesboro, TN	W 17–0	
October 18	2:00 p.m.	at Chattanooga	Chamberlain Field; Chattanooga, TN	W 49–0	
November 8		Union (TN)	Murfreesboro, TN	W 41–6	
November 11		at Cumberland (TN)	Lebanon, TN	W 41–0	
All times are in Central time
