= Charles H. Brown (American football) =

American football player, coach, and judge (1886–1963)

Biographical details
- Born: October 10, 1886; Tennessee, U.S.
- Died: May 16, 1963 (aged 76); Birmingham, Alabama, U.S.

Playing career
- 1910–1911: Vanderbilt
- 1917: Camp Gordon
- Position: Guard

Coaching career (HC unless noted)
- 1916: Birmingham
- 1919–1923: Birmingham–Southern

Head coaching record
- Overall: 23–22–4

Charles Hunt Brown (October 10, 1886 – May 16, 1963) was an American college football player and coach and judge. He was a standout guard for coach Dan McGugin's Vanderbilt Commodores football teams at Vanderbilt University, playing next to his brother Tom Brown. Charles Brown also served as the head football coach at Birmingham College in 1916 and at Birmingham–Southern College from 1919 to 1923. Brown played for Vanderbilt teams that won back to back Southern Intercollegiate Athletic Association (SIAA) championships in 1910 and 1911. Brown played for the 1917 Camp Gordon football team coached by Jogger Elcock.

Brown served as an infantry captain in the United States Army during World War I, losing a leg in combat in the Meuse–Argonne offensive in France. He was an assistant city attorney, deputy solicitor, and assistant state attorney before being appointed as a judge in Birmingham, Alabama in 1958. He was reappointed to the bench in 1962. Brown died on May 16, 1963, in Birmingham, after collapsing while presiding in court.

Brown urged his son, Charles Jr., to attend Georgia Tech.

== Head coaching record ==
Year	Team	Overall	Conference	Standing	Bowl/playoffs
Birmingham Panthers (Independent) (1916)
1916	Birmingham	7–1			
Birmingham:		7–1			
Birmingham–Southern Panthers (Independent) (1919–1923)
1919	Birmingham–Southern	4–3			
1920	Birmingham–Southern	6–3			
1921	Birmingham–Southern	4–4–1			
1922	Birmingham–Southern	1–6–1			
1923	Birmingham–Southern	1–5–2			
Birmingham–Southern:		16–21–4			
Total:		23–22–4			
