= 1919 Spring Hill Badgers football team =

American college football season

1919 Spring Hill Badgers football
- Conference: Independent
- Record: 3–3–1
- Head coach: Moon Ducote (1st season)

1919 Southern college football independents records
	Conf.			Overall
Team	W	L	T	W		L		T
Marshall		–		8	–	0	–	0
Southern College		–		5	–	0	–	0
Middle Tennessee State Normal		–		4	–	0	–	0
Phillips		–		10	–	0	–	1
Navy		–		7	–	1	–	0
West Virginia		–		8	–	2	–	0
Mississippi Normal		–		4	–	1	–	2
Presbyterian		–		4	–	3	–	2
North Texas State Normal		–		5	–	3	–	0
Birmingham–Southern		–		4	–	3	–	0
Abilene Christian		–		2	–	2	–	0
Southwest Texas State		–		4	–	4	–	0
Spring Hill		–		3	–	3	–	1
Stetson		–		4	–	4	–	0
West Tennessee State Normal		–		3	–	4	–	0
Chattanooga		–		3	–	5	–	1
Marion		–		3	–	6	–	0
Texas Mines		–		2	–	4	–	0
Delaware		–		2	–	5	–	1
Oglethorpe		–		2	–	6	–	1
Wake Forest		–		2	–	6	–	0
Sam Houston Normal		–		0	–	7	–	0

The 1919 Spring Hill Badgers football team represented the Spring Hill College as an independent during the 1919 college football season.

== Schedule ==
Date	Opponent	Site	Result	Source
October 4	at Mississippi A&M	New Athletic Field; Starkville, MS	L 6–12	
October 18	Tulane	Mobile, AL	L 0–21	
October 25	Alabama Medical	Mobile, AL	W 12–6	
November 1	vs. Marion	Selma, AL	W 13–0	
November 8	Auburn	Mobile, AL	L 0–10	
November 15	Birmingham–Southern	Mobile, AL	W 3–0	
November 27	Howard (AL)	Mobile, AL	T 6–6	
