= 1919 Texas Mines Miners football team =

American college football season

1919 Texas Mines Miners football
- Conference: Independent
- Record: 2–4
- Head coach: Tommy Dwyer (5th season)
- Home stadium: El Paso High School stadium

1919 Southern college football independents records
| | Conf. | | | Overall |
| Team | W | L | T | W | | L | | T |
|---|---|---|---|---|---|---|---|---|
| Marshall | | – | | 8 | – | 0 | – | 0 |
| Southern College | | – | | 5 | – | 0 | – | 0 |
| Middle Tennessee State Normal | | – | | 4 | – | 0 | – | 0 |
| Phillips | | – | | 10 | – | 0 | – | 1 |
| Navy | | – | | 7 | – | 1 | – | 0 |
| West Virginia | | – | | 8 | – | 2 | – | 0 |
| Mississippi Normal | | – | | 4 | – | 1 | – | 2 |
| Presbyterian | | – | | 4 | – | 3 | – | 2 |
| North Texas State Normal | | – | | 5 | – | 3 | – | 0 |
| Birmingham–Southern | | – | | 4 | – | 3 | – | 0 |
| Abilene Christian | | – | | 2 | – | 2 | – | 0 |
| Southwest Texas State | | – | | 4 | – | 4 | – | 0 |
| Spring Hill | | – | | 3 | – | 3 | – | 1 |
| Stetson | | – | | 4 | – | 4 | – | 0 |
| West Tennessee State Normal | | – | | 3 | – | 4 | – | 0 |
| Chattanooga | | – | | 3 | – | 5 | – | 1 |
| Marion | | – | | 3 | – | 6 | – | 0 |
| Texas Mines | | – | | 2 | – | 4 | – | 0 |
| Delaware | | – | | 2 | – | 5 | – | 1 |
| Oglethorpe | | – | | 2 | – | 6 | – | 1 |
| Wake Forest | | – | | 2 | – | 6 | – | 0 |
| Sam Houston Normal | | – | | 0 | – | 7 | – | 0 |

The 1919 Texas Mines Miners football team was an American football team that represented the Texas School of Mines—now known as the University of Texas at El Paso—as an independent during the 1919 college football season. In its fifth and final season under head coach Tommy Dwyer, the team compiled a 2–4 record and was outscored by a total of 131 to 67.

== Schedule ==
| Date | Opponent | Site | Result | Source |
|---|---|---|---|---|
| October 24 | Motor Transport | El Paso, TX | W 32–0 | |
| November 1 | at El Paso High School | El Paso, TX | W 15–6 | |
| November 8 | New Mexico Military | El Paso, TX | L 7–12 | |
| November 15 | New Mexico | El Paso High School stadium; El Paso, TX | L 13–57 | |
| November 21 | at Arizona | Tucson, AZ | L 0–46 | |
| November 27 | vs. Fort Bliss All-Stars | Rio Grande Park; El Paso, TX | L 0–10 | |
