= 1919 West Tennessee State Normal football team =

American college football season

1919 West Tennessee State Normal football
- Conference: Independent
- Record: 3–4
- Head coach: V. M. Campbell (2nd season)
- Captain: Baxter Crawford
- Home stadium: Hodges Field, Russwood Park

1919 Southern college football independents records
	Conf.			Overall
Team	W	L	T	W		L		T
Marshall		–		8	–	0	–	0
Southern College		–		5	–	0	–	0
Middle Tennessee State Normal		–		4	–	0	–	0
Phillips		–		10	–	0	–	1
Navy		–		7	–	1	–	0
West Virginia		–		8	–	2	–	0
Mississippi Normal		–		4	–	1	–	2
Presbyterian		–		4	–	3	–	2
North Texas State Normal		–		5	–	3	–	0
Birmingham–Southern		–		4	–	3	–	0
Abilene Christian		–		2	–	2	–	0
Southwest Texas State		–		4	–	4	–	0
Spring Hill		–		3	–	3	–	1
Stetson		–		4	–	4	–	0
West Tennessee State Normal		–		3	–	4	–	0
Chattanooga		–		3	–	5	–	1
Marion		–		3	–	6	–	0
Texas Mines		–		2	–	4	–	0
Delaware		–		2	–	5	–	1
Oglethorpe		–		2	–	6	–	1
Wake Forest		–		2	–	6	–	0
Sam Houston Normal		–		0	–	7	–	0

The 1919 West Tennessee State Normal football team was an American football team that represented West Tennessee State Normal School (now known as the University of Memphis) as an independent during the 1919 college football season. This was the first year of head coach V. M. Campbell's second stint as head coach. West Tennessee State Normal compiled a 3–4 record.

== Schedule ==
Date	Time	Opponent	Site	Result	Source
October 10		at Union (TN)	Jackson, TN	L 0–7	
October 17		at Jonesboro Aggies	Kays Field; Jonesboro, AR (rivalry)	L 0–6	
November 1	3:00 p.m.	Christian Brothers	Hodges Field; Memphis, TN	W 27–0	
November 8	3:00 p.m.	Memphis University School	Hodges Field; Memphis, TN	L 6–12	
November 15	3:00 p.m.	Central High School	Russwood Park; Memphis, TN	W 26–0	
November 21	2:30 p.m.	Vocational High School	Hodges Field; Memphis, TN	W 25–6	
November 27		at McTyeire School	McKenzie, TN	L 7–35	
All times are in Central time
