= 1919 Marion Cadets football team =

American college football season

1919 Marion Cadets football
- Conference: Independent
- Record: 3–6
- Head coach: Blandy Clarkson (4th season)

1919 Southern college football independents records
	Conf.			Overall
Team	W	L	T	W		L		T
Marshall		–		8	–	0	–	0
Florida Southern		–		5	–	0	–	0
Middle Tennessee State Normal		–		4	–	0	–	0
Phillips		–		10	–	0	–	1
Navy		–		7	–	1	–	0
West Virginia		–		8	–	2	–	0
Mississippi Normal		–		4	–	1	–	2
Presbyterian		–		4	–	3	–	2
North Texas State Normal		–		5	–	3	–	0
Birmingham–Southern		–		4	–	3	–	0
Southwest Texas State		–		4	–	4	–	0
Spring Hill		–		3	–	3	–	1
Abilene Christian		–		2	–	2	–	0
West Tennessee State Normal		–		3	–	4	–	0
Chattanooga		–		3	–	5	–	1
Southwestern Louisiana Industrial		–		2	–	4	–	2
Marion		–		3	–	6	–	0
Texas Mines		–		2	–	4	–	0
Delaware		–		2	–	5	–	1
Oglethorpe		–		2	–	6	–	1
Wake Forest		–		2	–	6	–	0
Sam Houston Normal		–		0	–	7	–	0

The 1919 Marion Cadets football team was an American football team that represented the Marion Military Institute as an independent during the 1919 college football season. In their fourth season under head coach Blandy Clarkson, the Cadets compiled an overall record of 3–6. Coach Clarkson left Marion in February 1920 to become head coach at VMI.

== Schedule ==
Date	Opponent	Site	Result	Source
September 21	Birmingham alumni	Marion, AL	W 14–0	
September 27	at Auburn	Drake Field; Auburn, AL	L 0–37	
October 10	Meridian College	Marion, AL	W 80–0	
October 17	Birmingham–Southern	Marion, AL	L 0–25	
October 24	at Alabama	University Field; Tuscaloosa, AL	L 0–61	
November 1	vs. Spring Hill	Selma, AL	L 0–13	
November 7	Alabama scrubs	Marion, AL	L 0–20	
November 14	Howard (AL)	Marion, AL	W 12–0	
November 27	at Georgia Military College	Milledgeville, GA	L 0–6	
