= 1919 Navy Midshipmen football team =

American college football season

1919 Navy Midshipmen football
- Conference: Independent
- Record: 7–1
- Head coach: Gil Dobie (3rd season)
- Offensive scheme: Single-wing
- Base defense: 6–3–2
- Captain: Eddie Ewen
- Home stadium: Worden Field

1919 Southern college football independents records
	Conf.			Overall
Team	W	L	T	W		L		T
Marshall		–		8	–	0	–	0
Southern College		–		5	–	0	–	0
Middle Tennessee State Normal		–		4	–	0	–	0
Phillips		–		10	–	0	–	1
Navy		–		7	–	1	–	0
West Virginia		–		8	–	2	–	0
Mississippi Normal		–		4	–	1	–	2
Presbyterian		–		4	–	3	–	2
North Texas State Normal		–		5	–	3	–	0
Birmingham–Southern		–		4	–	3	–	0
Abilene Christian		–		2	–	2	–	0
Southwest Texas State		–		4	–	4	–	0
Spring Hill		–		3	–	3	–	1
Stetson		–		4	–	4	–	0
West Tennessee State Normal		–		3	–	4	–	0
Chattanooga		–		3	–	5	–	1
Marion		–		3	–	6	–	0
Texas Mines		–		2	–	4	–	0
Delaware		–		2	–	5	–	1
Oglethorpe		–		2	–	6	–	1
Wake Forest		–		2	–	6	–	0
Sam Houston Normal		–		0	–	7	–	0

The 1919 Navy Midshipmen football team represented the United States Naval Academy during the 1919 college football season. In their third season under head coach Gil Dobie, the Midshipmen compiled a 7–1 record, shut out five opponents, and outscored all opponents by a combined score of 298 to 18.

After cancellation in 1917 and 1918 due to World War I, the annual Army–Navy Game was played on November 29 at the Polo Grounds in New York City; Navy won 6–0.

== Schedule ==
Date	Opponent	Site	Result	Source
October 4	NC State	Worden Field; Annapolis, MD	W 49–0	
October 11	Johns Hopkins	Worden Field; Annapolis, MD (rivalry)	W 66–0	
October 25	Bucknell	Worden Field; Annapolis, MD	W 21–6	
November 1	West Virginia Wesleyan	Worden Field; Annapolis, MD	W 20–6	
November 8	Georgetown	Worden Field; Annapolis, MD	L 0–6	
November 15	Colby	Worden Field; Annapolis, MD	W 121–0	
November 29	vs. Army	Polo Grounds; New York, NY (Army–Navy Game)	W 6–0	
December 5	USS Utah	Worden Field; Annapolis, MD	W 15–0	
