= 1919 Abilene Christian football team =

American college football season

1919 Abilene Christian football
- Conference: Independent
- Record: 2–2
- Head coach: Vernon McCasland (1st season)
- Captain: Ogle Jones

1919 Southern college football independents records
| | Conf. | | | Overall |
| Team | W | L | T | W | | L | | T |
|---|---|---|---|---|---|---|---|---|
| Marshall | | – | | 8 | – | 0 | – | 0 |
| Southern College | | – | | 5 | – | 0 | – | 0 |
| Middle Tennessee State Normal | | – | | 4 | – | 0 | – | 0 |
| Phillips | | – | | 10 | – | 0 | – | 1 |
| Navy | | – | | 7 | – | 1 | – | 0 |
| West Virginia | | – | | 8 | – | 2 | – | 0 |
| Mississippi Normal | | – | | 4 | – | 1 | – | 2 |
| Presbyterian | | – | | 4 | – | 3 | – | 2 |
| North Texas State Normal | | – | | 5 | – | 3 | – | 0 |
| Birmingham–Southern | | – | | 4 | – | 3 | – | 0 |
| Abilene Christian | | – | | 2 | – | 2 | – | 0 |
| Southwest Texas State | | – | | 4 | – | 4 | – | 0 |
| Spring Hill | | – | | 3 | – | 3 | – | 1 |
| Stetson | | – | | 4 | – | 4 | – | 0 |
| West Tennessee State Normal | | – | | 3 | – | 4 | – | 0 |
| Chattanooga | | – | | 3 | – | 5 | – | 1 |
| Marion | | – | | 3 | – | 6 | – | 0 |
| Texas Mines | | – | | 2 | – | 4 | – | 0 |
| Delaware | | – | | 2 | – | 5 | – | 1 |
| Oglethorpe | | – | | 2 | – | 6 | – | 1 |
| Wake Forest | | – | | 2 | – | 6 | – | 0 |
| Sam Houston Normal | | – | | 0 | – | 7 | – | 0 |

The 1919 Abilene Christian football team was an American football team that represented Childers Classical Institute—now known as the Abilene Christian University—as an independent during the 1919 college football season. It was the school's first year fielding a football team. Led by Vernon McCasland in his first and only season as head coach, the team compiled a record of 2–2.

== Schedule ==
| Date | Time | Opponent | Site | Result | Source |
|---|---|---|---|---|---|
| October 18 | | at Midland College | Midland, TX | W 46–0 | |
| October 25 | | at Daniel Baker | Brownwood, TX | L 6–13 | |
| November 1 | 2:00 p.m. | Daniel Baker | Abilene, TX | W 21–7 | |
| November 18 | | at Wesley College | Greenville, TX | L 3–68 | |
