= 1919 Pittsburgh Panthers football team =

American college football season

1919 Pittsburgh Panthers football
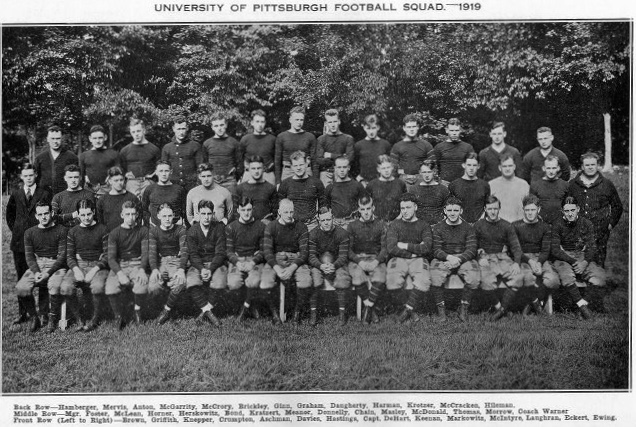
- Conference: Independent
- Record: 6–2–1
- Head coach: Pop Warner (5th season)
- Offensive scheme: Double wing
- Captain: Jimmy DeHart
- Home stadium: Forbes Field

1919 Eastern college football independents records
	Conf.			Overall
Team	W	L	T	W		L		T
Harvard		–		9	–	0	–	1
Penn State		–		7	–	1	–	0
Swarthmore		–		7	–	1	–	0
Dartmouth		–		6	–	1	–	1
Colgate		–		5	–	1	–	1
New Hampshire		–		7	–	2	–	0
Lafayette		–		6	–	2	–	0
Washington & Jefferson		–		6	–	2	–	0
Williams		–		6	–	2	–	0
Syracuse		–		8	–	3	–	0
Penn		–		6	–	2	–	1
Pittsburgh		–		6	–	2	–	1
Lehigh		–		6	–	3	–	0
Princeton		–		4	–	2	–	1
Geneva		–		4	–	2	–	2
Army		–		6	–	3	–	0
Boston College		–		5	–	3	–	0
Holy Cross		–		5	–	3	–	0
Rutgers		–		5	–	3	–	0
Yale		–		5	–	3	–	0
Villanova		–		5	–	3	–	1
Brown		–		5	–	4	–	1
Bucknell		–		5	–	4	–	1
NYU		–		4	–	4	–	0
Carnegie Tech		–		3	–	4	–	0
Columbia		–		2	–	4	–	3
Cornell		–		3	–	5	–	0
Vermont		–		3	–	6	–	0
Franklin & Marshall		–		2	–	4	–	2
Tufts		–		2	–	5	–	0
Buffalo		–		0	–	5	–	1
Rhode Island State		–		0	–	8	–	1
Drexel		–		0	–	4	–	0

The 1919 Pittsburgh Panthers football team was an American football team that represented the University of Pittsburgh as an independent during the 1919 college football season. In its fifth season under head coach Pop Warner, the team compiled a 6–2–1 record and outscored all opponents by a total of 119 to 66. The team played its home games at Forbes Field in Pittsburgh.

== Schedule ==
Date	Opponent	Site	Result	Attendance	Source
October 4	at Geneva	Beaver Falls, PA	W 33–2	4,000	
October 11	West Virginia	Forbes Field; Pittsburgh, PA (rivalry)	W 26–0	20,000	
October 18	at Syracuse	Archbold Stadium; Syracuse, NY	L 3–24	15,000	
October 25	Georgia Tech	Forbes Field; Pittsburgh, PA	W 16–6	25,000	
November 1	at Lehigh	Taylor Stadium; Bethlehem, PA	W 14–0	10,000	
November 8	Washington & Jefferson	Forbes Field; Pittsburgh, PA	W 7–6	30,150	
November 15	at Penn	Franklin Field; Philadelphia, PA	T 3–3	30,000	
November 22	Carnegie Tech	Forbes Field; Pittsburgh, PA	W 17–7		
November 27	Penn State	Forbes Field; Pittsburgh, PA (rivalry)	L 0–20	25,000	

== Preseason ==
"The favorable reaction in the realm of sport since the great war, affected Pitt as well as every other university. The year 1919 saw the Gold and Blue represented in almost every branch of sport – football, basketball, track, swimming and tennis. This year sees a revival in baseball and boxing – and a new sport, aviation makes its initial bow, Pitt being the seventh charter member admitted to the Inter-collegiate Flying Association."

William J. Foster was appointed student manager for the 1919−20 football season by Karl E. Davis, and Jimmy DeHart, "the idol of football lovers of Pittsburgh and one of the greatest all-around athletes ever developed at the University of Pittsburgh," was unanimously elected Captain of the 1919 team by a mail-in vote.

According to Karl E. Davis, Graduate Manager of Athletics, in his preseason prospectus for The Pitt Weekly, the team will assemble at Camp Hamilton, Windber on September 8 for three weeks of preseason practice. "The Engineering School students will be there all summer and the camp will be improved in a number of ways, so that it will be more complete than ever." Coach Warner will welcome seven returning lettermen from the 1918 championship team – Harvey Harman, Herb Stein, Herb McCracken, Lou Mavis, Tom Davies and William Horner. In addition,"a number of men from the service who are experienced and who are eligible under the residence rule will help considerably," among these being Andy Hastings, Jimmy DeHart, James Morrow, John McLean, Harold Krotzer, James Bond, Gus Aschman, Frank McDonald, Cliff Brown and Merle Hileman.

Coach Warner warned:

"I will say that those who are busily predicting another clean sweep for Pitt are taking a great deal for granted and, I believe, are failing to give due consideration to the probable strength of some of our opponents. Manager Davis has arranged what looks like the hardest schedule Pitt has ever undertaken...There is not a point in the schedule where Pitt will be able to let down. It is too much to expect a team to go along year after year without suffering a defeat, and it may be that the Panthers will meet their Waterloo before the coming campaign is very far advanced."

== Coaching staff ==
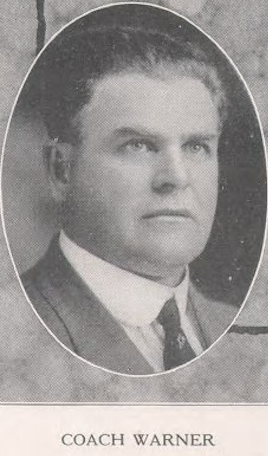
Pop Warner

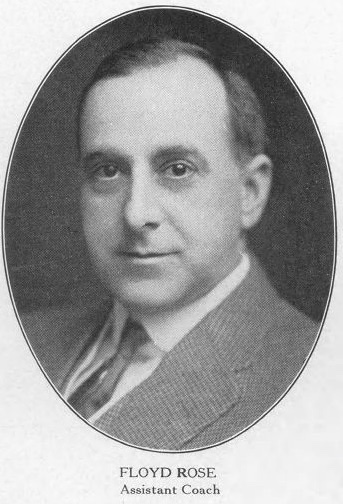
Floyd Rose

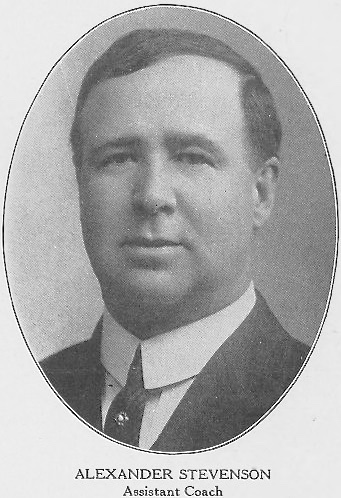
Alexander Stevenson

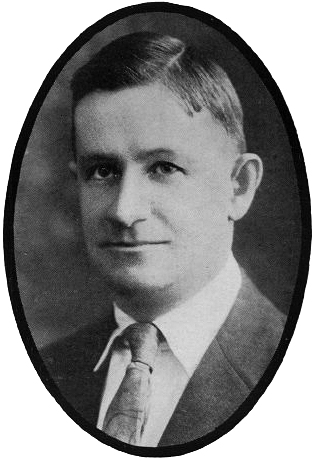
Andrew Kerr

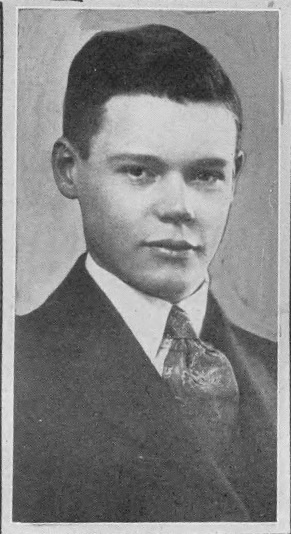
William J. Foster

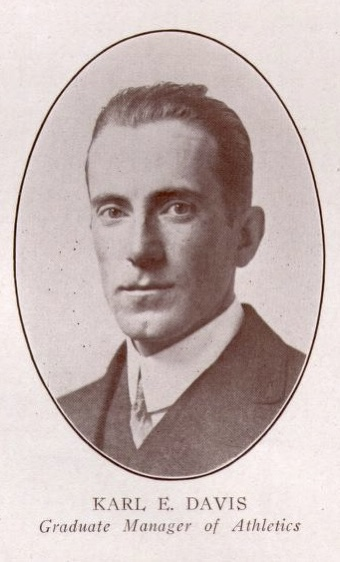
Karl E. Davis

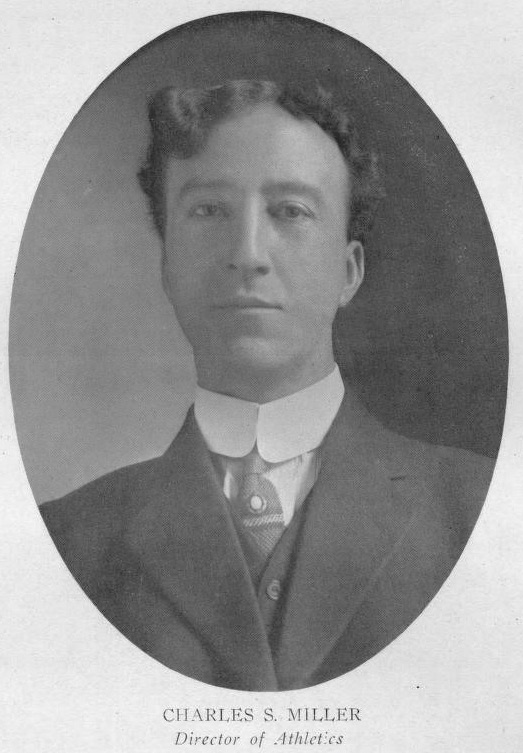
Charles S. Miller

1919 Pittsburgh Panthers football staff
Coaching staff: Pop Warner – Head coach; Floyd Rose – Assistant coach; Alexander Stevenson – Assistant coach; Andrew Kerr – Freshman Coach	Support staff: W. J. Foster – Student Football Manager; Karl E. Davis – Graduate manager of Athletics; Charles S. Miller – Director of athletics

== Roster ==
1919 Pittsburgh Panthers football roster
Player	Position	Games	Height	Weight	Class	Prep School	Degree	Residence
Gus Ashman*	quarterback	5	5' 10″	180	1920	Beaver H. S.	Economics	Beaver, PA
James Bond*	guard	7	5' 9″	195	1921	Schenley H. S.	Pre-Med	Pittsburgh, PA
Abe J. Breman*	fullback	5	5' 9″	174	1921	Indiana Normal	College	Pittsburgh, PA
Ben Breman	tackle	0	5' 8”	161	1921	Peabody H. S.	Dental School	Pittsburgh, PA
Cliff Brown*	end	5	5' 8″	170	1920	The Kiski School	Mechanical Engineering	Liverpool, OH
Harry Daugherty	end	1	6'	160	1920	Jeannette H. S.	Economics	Jeannette, PA
Thomas Davies*	halfback	9	5' 8″	153	1922	The Kiski School	Economics	Washington, PA
James DeHart*	halfback	5	5' 6″	150	1920	Reynoldsville H.S.	Associate College	Reynoldsville, PA
Frank E. Eckert*	end	5	5' 8″	168	1920	Ridgway H. S.	Mines	Ridgway, PA
Fred Ewing*	end	7	5' 11″	170	1922	The Kiski School	Dental School	Saltsburg, PA
Alvar H. Ginn*	tackle	5	6' 2″	175	1920	Ben Avon H. S.	Associate College	Ben Avon, PA
W. Cullen Gourley	tackle	3	5' 11″	190	1921	Punxsutawney H. S.	Economics	Punxsutawney, PA
Davis Graham	guard	0	6'	175	1921	McKees Rocks H. S.	College	McKees Rocks, PA
Thomas J. Hamberger*	fullback	5	5' 6″	174	1921	Lock Haven H. S.	Dental School	Lock Haven, PA
Harvey Harman*	tackle	8	6'	185	1922	Peabody H. S.	College	Pittsburgh, PA
Andy Hastings*	halfback	9	5' 8″	178	1920	The Kiski School	Economics	Brookville, PA
Adolph Herskowitz	tackle	1	5' 11″	158	1921	Wilkinsburg H. S.	Dental School	Wilkinsburg, PA
Merle Hileman	halfback	1	5' 7″	170	1921	Wilkinsburg H. S.	Economics	Wilkinsburg, PA
W. W. Horner	quarterback	1	5' 9″	160	1921	New Castle H. S.	Dental School	New Castle, PA
Oscar Kratzert*	guard	6	5' 11″	188	1921	Woodlawn H. S.	Dental School	Woodlawn, PA
Harold Krotzer	fullback	1	5' 11″	175	1921	Beaver H.S.	Economics	Beaver, PA
John Laughran*	halfback	9	5' 10″	150	1921	Braddock H. S.	Economics	Rankin, PA
Herbert McCracken*	quarterback	8	5' 9″	168	1921	Sewickley H. S.	Economics	Sewickley, PA
John McCrory*	end	3	5' 11″	160	1921	Wilkinsburg H. S.	Dental School	Wilkinsburg, PA
Frank McDonald	end	2	6'	165	1922	Carnegie H. S.	Engineering	Carnegie, PA
John McLean*	guard	8	5' 11″	181	1923	Homestead H.S.	Dental School	Homestead, PA
Louis Markowitz	guard	3	5' 7″	193	1921	McKees Rocks H. S.	Dental School	McKees Rocks, PA
Frank Masley	tackle	2	5' 10″	170	1921	East Liberty Acad.	Civil Engineering	Pittsburgh, PA
Alex Meanor*	guard	7	6' 2″	200	1921	Fifth Avenue H. S.	Economics	Pittsburgh, PA
Louis Mervis*	tackle	3	5' 8″	180	1921	Braddock H. S.	Economics	Braddock, PA
James Morrow*	quarterback	5	5' 10″	168	1919	Carnegie H. S.	Dental School	Rennerdale, PA
Bernard Peters	end	2	5' 10″	160	1920	Tarentum H. S.	Mines	Tarentum, PA
Herb Stein*	center	9	6'	180	1921	The Kiski School	Economics	Niles, OH
W. J. Thomas*	guard	4	5' 11″	210	1921	Lock Haven Normal	Economics	Erie, PA
William J. Foster	manager	0			1920		Economics	Pittsburgh, PA
* Letterman

== Game summaries ==
=== At Geneva ===
Week 1: Pitt at Geneva

Team	1	2	3	4	Total
• Pitt	13	14	0	6	33
Geneva	0	0	0	2	2

- Date: October 4, 1919
- Location: Public School park
  Beaver Falls, PA
- Game start: 3:00 p.m.
- Game attendance: 4,000
- Referee: R. E. Cadigan (Syracuse)

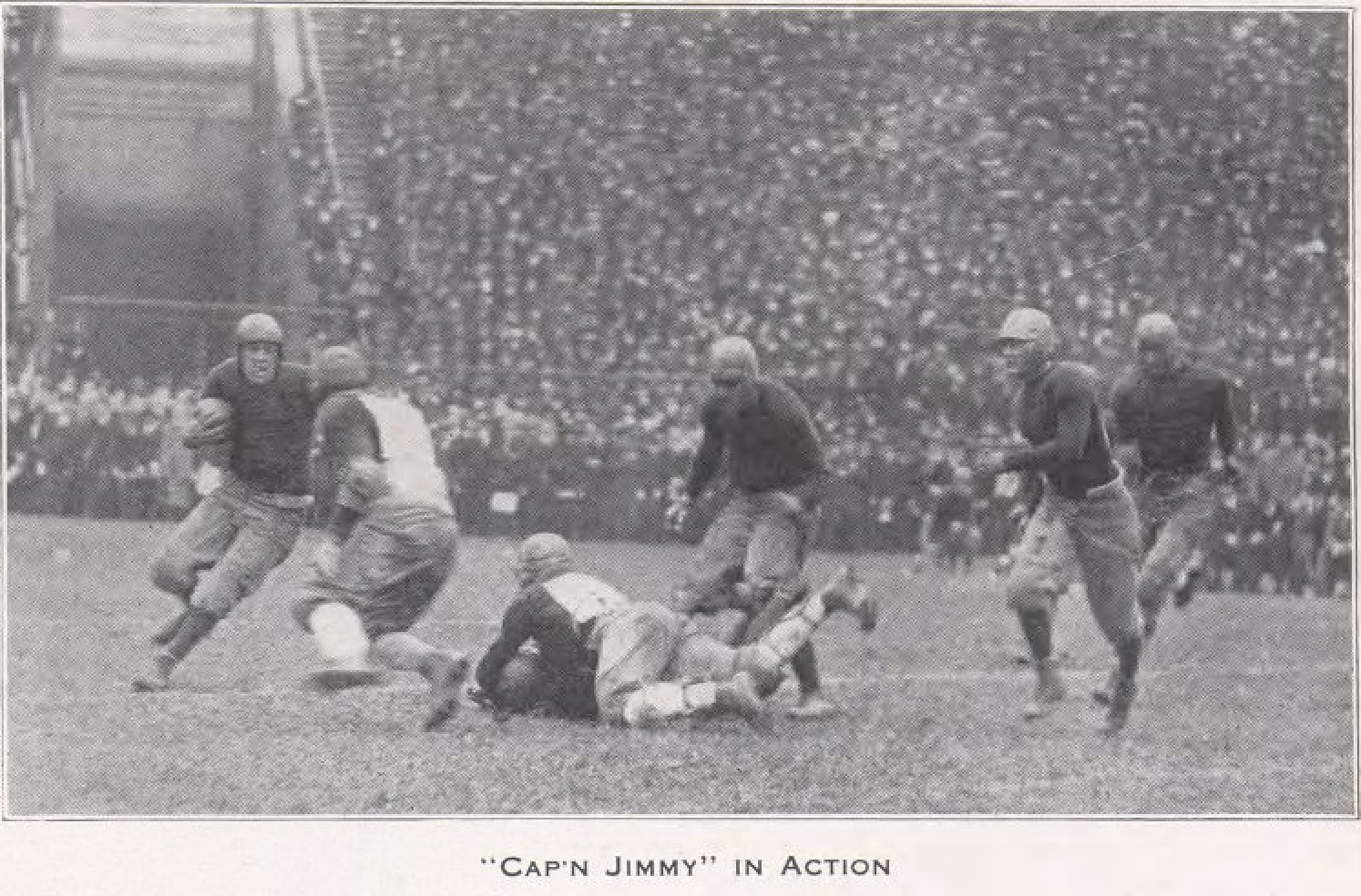
1919 Pitt football, James DeHart around end

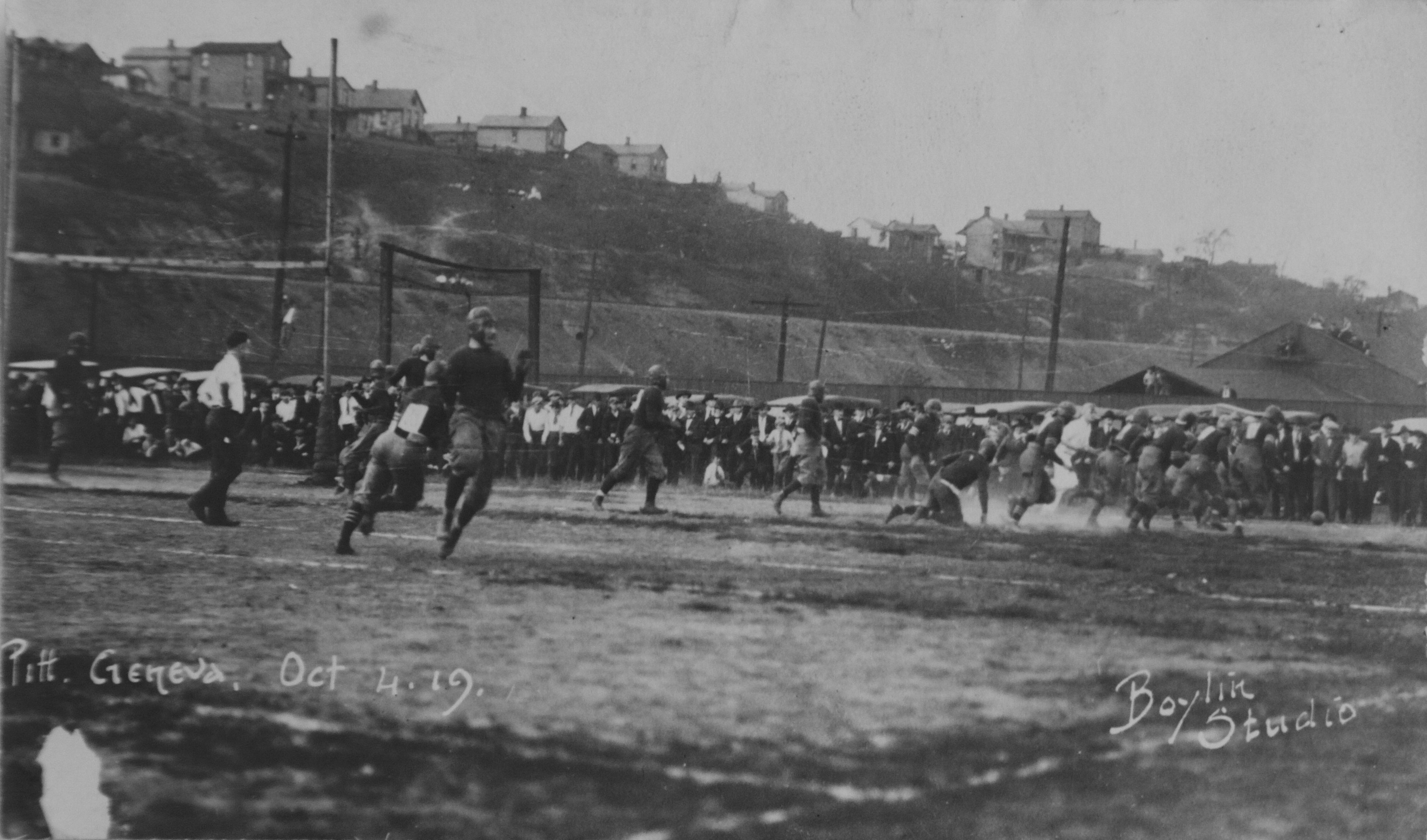
Postcard from October 4, 1919 Geneva vs. Pitt game

The Pitt Panthers kicked off the 1919 season in Beaver Falls on October 5 with a game against the Covenanters of Geneva College. Third year coach Philip Henry Bridenbaugh led Geneva to a 4–2 record in 1918. "The Genevans have been preparing for this battle for some time and are declared to be in the best of physical condition. Geneva has a veteran eleven this year, depending for the most part upon the same classy outfit that won fame last fall by defeating Washington & Jefferson and putting up such a stiff battle against the strong Wissahickson Barracks gridders."

"Glenn Warner's University of Pittsburgh football squad today opened its season with a 33 to 0 victory over Geneva College. The game was unimpressive except to show that Captain Jimmy DeHart and Andy Hastings, stars of the 1917 team, had lost none of their ability. These two alone defeated the Beaver Falls boys. Between them they scored the four touchdowns made in the first half, and Hastings kicked three of the resultant goals. They ran around the ends and through the line at will." Coach Warner played the reserves in the second half. The third quarter was scoreless but in the fourth, Jim Bond blocked a Geneva punt and Fred Ewing pounced on it in the end zone for the last touchdown. William Horner kicked the goal after to close out the scoring. Harry Daugherty veteran of the Argonne, who came through the war unscathed, suffered a broken ankle and was out for the remainder of the season.

On the Tuesday after the game this note appeared in The Pittsburgh Post: "Pitt admits the Covenanters scored a safety, which in the excitement of the struggle was called a touchback. The officials who handled the game have decided that the play was a safety, which entitles Geneva to two points, and the score will go into the official records as 33 to 2."

The lineup for Pitt against Geneva was John McCrory (left end), Harvey Harman (left tackle), Oscar Kratzert (left guard), Herb Stein (center), John McLean (right guard), Gus Aschman (right tackle), Herb McCracken (right end), Thomas Hamberger (quarterback), Tom Davies (left halfback), Jimmy DeHart (right halfback) and Andy Hastings (fullback). Substitutes appearing in the game for Pitt were Fred Ewing, Alvar Ginn, Harold Krotzert, John Laughran, Merle Hileman, James Bond, Harry Daugherty, Cullen Gourley, Frank Eckert, Alex Meanor, Bernard Peters and Frank Masley. The game was played in two 12-minute quarters and two 10-minute quarters.

=== West Virginia ===
Week 2: West Virginia at Pitt

Team	1	2	3	4	Total
West Virginia	0	0	0	0	0
• Pitt	6	0	13	7	26

- Date: October 12, 1919
- Location: Forbes Field
  Pittsburgh, PA
- Game start: 3:00 p.m.
- Game attendance: 20,000
- Game weather: Rain
- Referee: Robert W. Maxwell (Swarthmore)

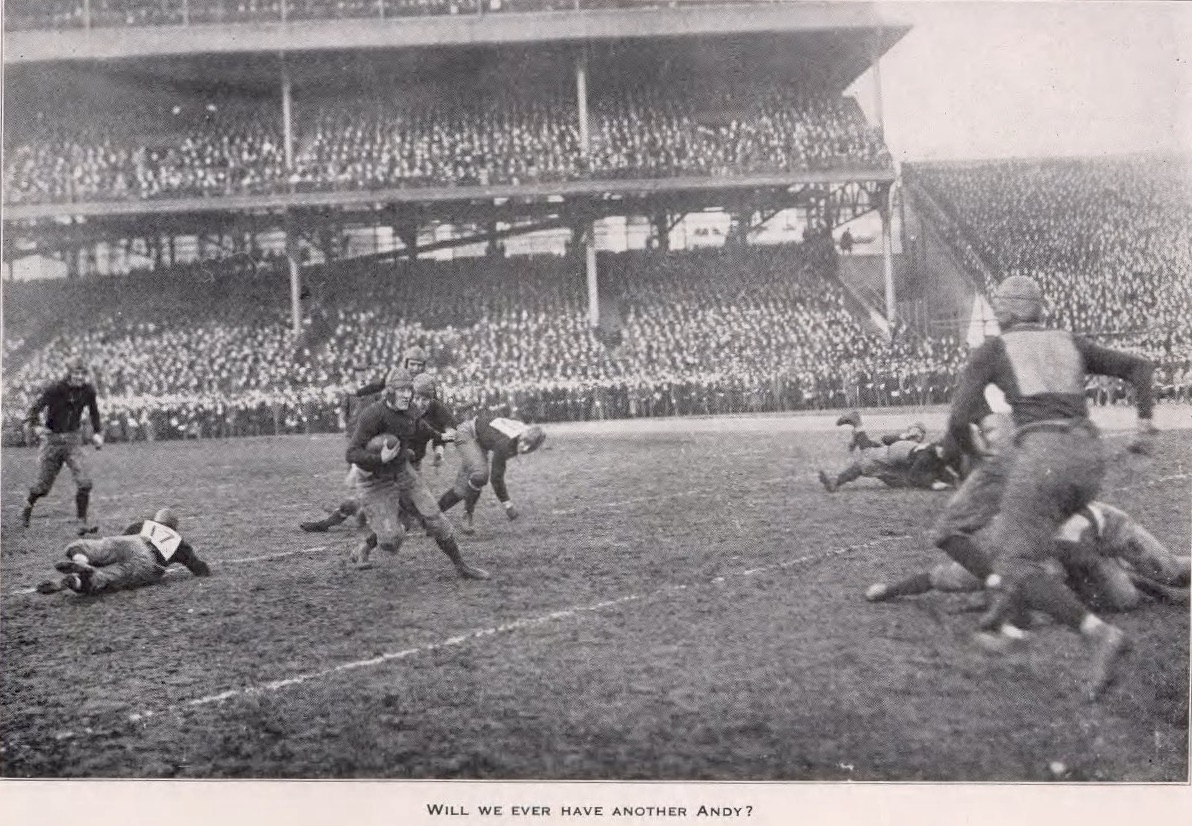
Pitt halfback Andy Hastings gaining yardage versus West Virginia

The fifteenth meeting with the West Virginia Mountaineers took place in Pittsburgh on October 11, 1919. The unbeaten (2–0) Mountaineers were led by third year coach Mont McIntire and had scored 116 points in two games, while giving up 0. The Mountaineers did not play in 1918 but had a veteran team and a consensus All-America fullback in Ira Rodgers.

Coach Warner "realizes that the Mountaineers are going to invade Pittsburgh 'loaded for bear,' and that they are confident of returning home with a victory. He also realizes that their confidence is well grounded, and that it is going to take a much better brand of football than the Panthers showed against Geneva to stave off the invaders."

On Wednesday (October 8) Harry Keck of The Gazette Times wrote: "West Virginia has one of the greatest teams the country has seen in several years and a loss to her will be far from a disgrace."

On Sunday he changed his tune: "A combination of the 'breaks,' superior football and a sloppy field enabled the University of Pittsburgh eleven to trample the husky West Virginia Mountaineers in a sea of mud at Forbes Field yesterday afternoon 26 to 0. Four touchdowns were scored by Pitt. The largest opening day crowd in the history of Pitt football turned out for the game and packed all parts of the grandstand. It was estimated that the attendance ran close to 20,000."

Pitt scored in the first period on a 3 yard plunge by Andy Hastings. Hastings missed the goal kick. The second quarter was scoreless. Pitt led 6–0 at the halftime. In the third stanza two touchdowns were scored. Herb Stein scooped up a fumbled punt on the Mountaineers' 30-yard line and ran across the goal line. Hastings kicked the goal. West Virginia fumbled a few plays later on their 6-yard line and Pitt recovered. Hastings passed to Tom Davies for the score. The kick was unsuccessful. Pitt led 19–0 after three quarters. The final score came after an eleven play sustained drive from midfield and ended with a three yard dash through left guard by Hastings. Hastings kicked goal to end the scoring: Pitt 26 to West Virginia 0. West Virginia finished the season with an 8–2 record.

The Pitt lineup for the game against West Virginia was John McCrory (left end), Harvey Harman (left tackle), James Bond (left guard), Herb Stein (center), John McLean (right guard), Lou Mervis (right tackle), Fred Ewing (right end), Jimmy DeHart (quarterback), Tom Davies (left halfback), Andy Hastings (right halfback) and James Morrow (fullback). Substitutes appearing in the game for Pitt were Thomas Hamberger, John Laughran, Oscar Kratzert, Frank Eckert, Cliff Brown, Herb McCracken, Louis Markowitz, Frank Masley, Abe Breman and Gus Aschman. The game was played in 12-minute quarters.

=== At Syracuse ===
Week 3: Pitt at Syracuse

Team	1	2	3	4	Total
Pitt	3	0	0	0	3
• Syracuse	10	7	0	7	24

- Date: October 18, 1919
- Location: Archbold Stadium
  Syracuse, NY
- Game start: 2:30 p.m.
- Game attendance: 15,000
- Referee: Nathan A. Tufts (Brown)

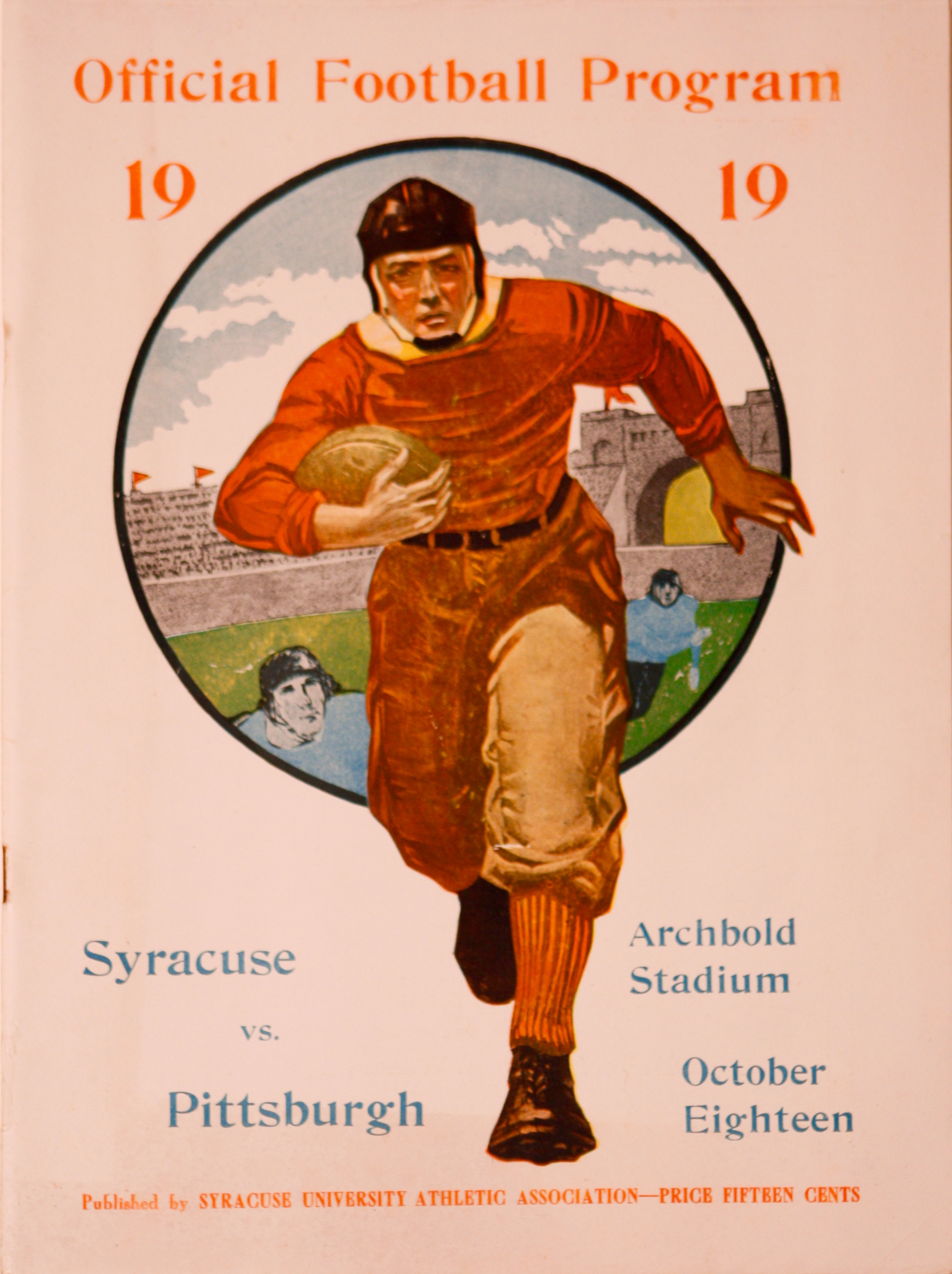
Program for October 18, 1919 Syracuse vs. Pitt game

The second road game for the 1919 Panthers was a train trip on the P. & L. E. to Syracuse, New York to take on the Syracuse Orangemen at Archbold Stadium. Frank "Buck" O'Neill was in his eighth and final year at the helm of the Syracuse eleven and he had a veteran team that stood 3–0, having just beaten a strong Army team. Starting guard, Doc Alexander, was a 1919 consensus All-American and center Harry Robertson also received mention.

Carlton Ketchum of The Pittsburg Press set the scene: "Is the old Pitt Panther in for a tail-twisting today? Well, if you buy your eye-glasses in Syracuse, there's nothing else to it. The Syracusans are reported to be in the best condition of the season. They have been thinking of little else than the Pitt game ever since their campaign opened. They want to beat Pitt and that's all there is to it." The Panthers are fairly healthy as DeHart, Mervis and Morrow have mended. Pitt's attack should be able to make it interesting for the Orangemen.

According to Harry Keck of The Gazette Times Coach Warner was worried: "Unless I miss my guess by a whole lot, Syracuse will go into tomorrow's game feeling itself the underdog, while it will require a bit of picking up to make my men fight their hardest. Some sort of a letdown is to be expected from a team which was primed last week as was Pitt for West Virginia. If that letdown is too great there is a real reason for us to worry over the outcome of the Syracuse game."

The 1921 Owl Year Book had the best recap: "Pitt, 3; Syracuse, 24. This is the game we would like to forget. It was on this occasion that Pitt suffered its first defeat in five seasons. We hand it to Syracuse; they turned the trick in a very capable manner. The Orange team gave decided evidence of genuine superiority, in both offense and defense. Pitt fought hard and with the best that was in them, but to no avail. Andy Hasting's field goal from the thirty-yard line was all that saved Pitt from a shutout."

The Gazette Times gave it historical perspective: "Three years ago this month one of the greatest upsets in the history of football was put across on the gridiron of the magnificent Archbold Stadium in this city. The great Syracuse team with its boasted All-American stars was crushed in the path of Glenn Warner's steam rolling Pitt Panther machine succumbing by a score of 30 to 0, when the entire football world was looking for a Syracuse triumph. Today on the same gridiron, with Pitt, unbeaten by a collegiate foe through four full seasons, and parts of two others and the favorite in the advance dope, the well-known worm turned. Once more the dope was upset a thousand ways. Syracuse winning by the decisive score of 24 to 3, and winning on its merits." The Orangemen finished the season with an 8–3 record.

Quarterback Willard Ackley scored all but six of the Syracuse points. He ran for two touchdowns, kicked three goal afters and added a field goal from placement. Substitute fullback D. Martin scored the other Syracuse touchdown.

Pitt Captain Jimmy Dehart praised the Orangemen: "I want to say that Syracuse played absolutely clean and fair football and deserved to win. It is the best team I ever have played against."

The Pitt lineup for the game against Syracuse was John McCrory (left end), Harvey Harman (left tackle), John McLean (left guard), Herb Stein (center), James Bond (right guard), Lou Mervis (right tackle), Fred Ewing (right end), Jimmy DeHart (quarterback), Tom Davies (left halfback), Andy Hastings (right halfback), and Jim Morrow (fullback). Substitutes appearing in the game for Pitt were Cliff Brown, Adolph Herskowitz, Thomas Hamberger, Oscar Kratzert, John Laughran and Abe Breman. The game was played in 15-minute quarters.

=== Georgia Tech ===
Week 4: Georgia Tech at Pitt

Team	1	2	3	4	Total
Georgia Tech	0	0	6	0	6
• Pitt	13	3	0	0	16

- Date: October 25, 1919
- Location: Forbes Field
  Pittsburgh, PA
- Game start: 3:00 p.m.
- Game attendance: 25,000
- Referee: Nathan Tufts (Brown)

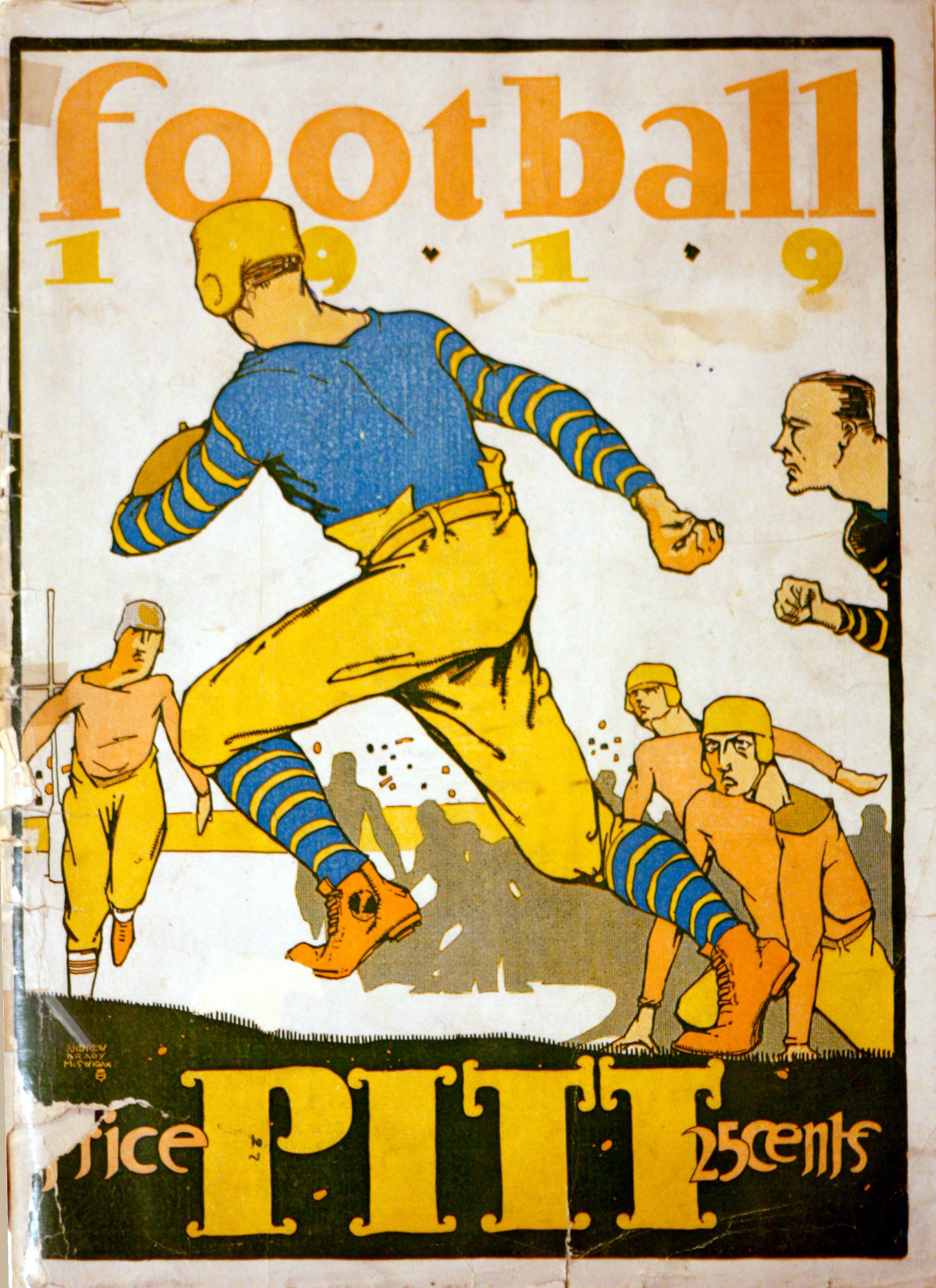
1919 University of Pittsburgh tenth annual football yearbook used as game program

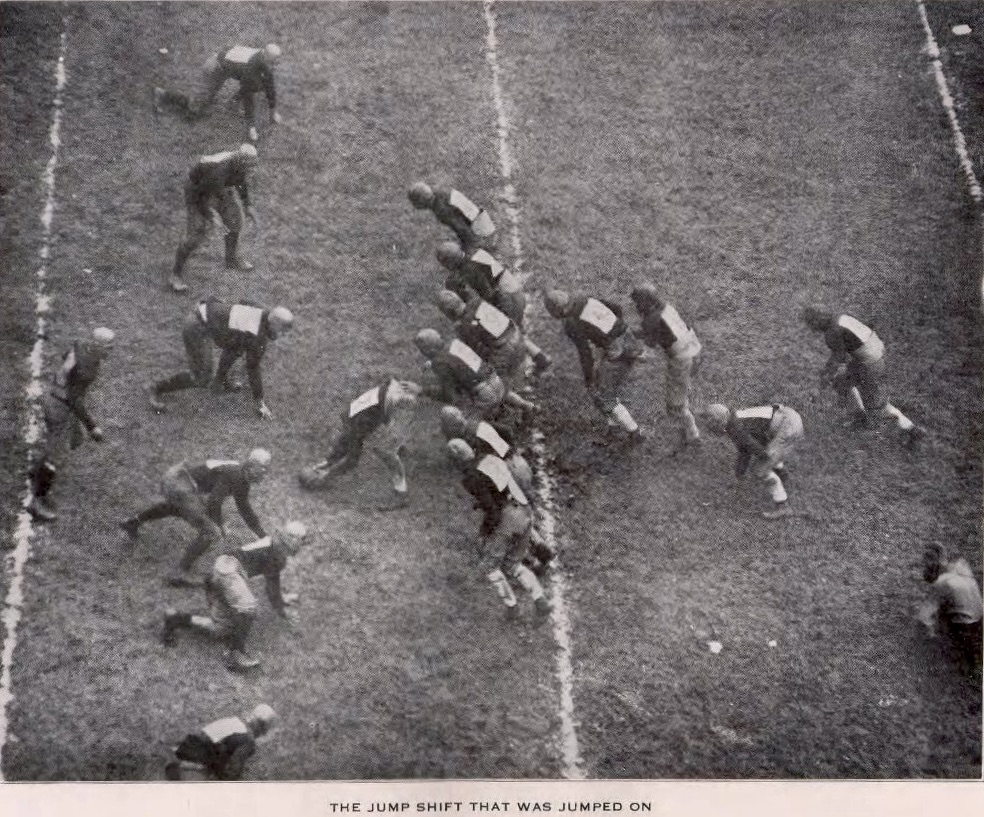
1918-1919 Georgia Tech Golden Tornado - Famous "Jump Shift"

On Monday, October 20 The Atlanta Constitution noted: "'On to Pittsburg' is the cry of the Yellow Jackets this week, and they will hop the old rattler for Pittsburgh and other points on Wednesday. The Jackets see at least there is one team in the country that can take Pitt's measure, and they are going to do their best to make it number two next Saturday." It is practically assured that the Tech band will make the trip and startle the natives with that famous old tune, better known as Ramblin Wreck.

The 1919 Georgia Tech Yellow Jackets were led by John Heisman in his sixteenth and final year at the helm. The Jackets had a record of 5–0 and had not given up any points. They would go on and finish the season with a 7–3 record. Their lineup was stocked with all-star players. End Bill Fincher, halfback Buck Flowers and fullback Judy Harlan were on the composite eleven All-Southern team. End Al Slaton, guards Dummy Lebey and Ham Dowling, and center Pup Phillips received numerous mentions.

Pitt was banged up from the Syracuse game and starters John McCrory and James Morrow did not even suit up. "Andy Hastings, Jimmy DeHart, James Bond and Harvey Harman were far from being fit." "Against this banged up outfit Georgia Tech was prepared to send the cream of its talent. With all the men in good condition revenge for the 1918 defeat is predicted by their rooters."

With the strong opening headline: Pitt Wallops Georgia Tech - Ralph S. Davis of The Pittsburg Press praised the Panthers: "'The Golden Tornado' is only a "brass breeze" after all! Before the weakest football team that the University of Pittsburgh has had in half a dozen years, the highly touted Georgia Tech aggregation went down to defeat yesterday at Forbes Field, by the score of 16 to 6."

Les Rawlings of The Atlanta Constitution praised the Yellow Jackets: "Staging one of the most brilliant comebacks in the history of the game, the Golden Tornado of Georgia Tech held the University of Pittsburgh Panthers to a 16-to-6 score after the easterners had snowed them under an avalanche of thirteen counters in the first quarter. But after the first quarter, Tech fought with her back to the wall, and the Panthers were outplayed from that stage of the encounter to the finish of the fight, the game ending with the ball in Pitt's possession on Tech's 10-yard line."

"In just five minutes of play, the Panthers scored the first touchdown on a forward pass. Hastings to Davies to DeHart, Jimmy going over at the extreme corner of the field." Hastings kicked goal and Pitt led 7 to 0. "It was no time at all until Pitt was headed goalward again. Tom Davies eased around end for fifty yards and placed the ball on the visitors 7-yard line. In a couple plunges Hastings slid through for the second score." He missed the goal after and Pitt led 13 to 0. "Late in the second quarter...Davies dropped back and kicked a beautiful field goal from the 27-yard line, bringing the Panther total up to 16 points." The halftime score read 16 to 0. The Georgians scored in the third period. "The score came after a steady march of sixty yards down the field, with the famous jump shift being used as the ground-gainer." Tech fullback Harlan finally plunged into the end zone for the score. Fincher missed the goal kick and the final tally was Pitt 16 to Georgia Tech 6.

Coach Heisman gave Pitt credit: "Pitt was the tornado, while Tech seemed to be doing little but hunting the cyclone cellar. In a word, Tech was completely outplayed and lost the game through what happened in that first quarter before they came out of their trance and buckled down to the brand of football they are capable of playing."

The Pitt lineup for the game against Georgia Tech was Alvar Ginn (left end), Harvey Harman (left tackle), Alex Meanor (left guard), Herb Stein (center), John McLean (right guard), Lou Mervis (right tackle), Fred Ewing (right end), Herb McCracken (quarterback), Tom Davies (left halfback), Jimmy DeHart (right halfback) and Andy Hastings (fullback). Substitutes appearing in the game for Pitt were Cliff Brown, Oscar Kratzert, John Laughran, Abe Breman and Gus Aschman. The game was played in 15-minute quarters.

=== At Lehigh ===
Week 5: Pitt at Lehigh

Team	1	2	3	4	Total
• Pitt	0	0	0	14	14
Lehigh	0	0	0	0	0

- Date: November 1, 1919
- Location: Taylor Field
  Bethlehem, PA
- Game start: 2:30 p.m.
- Game attendance: 10,000
- Game weather: Rain
- Referee: Tom Thorpe (Columbia)

The third road trip of 1919 took the Panthers east to South Bethlehem, PA to face the undefeated and unscored upon Lehigh Brown and White football team. Coach Tom Keady was in his eighth year at Lehigh and had his team off to a 5–0 record. The Lehigh lineup had to be adjusted due to some injuries. Captain and starting guard Bucky McDonald would not play. Starting backs Douglas and Hezelman would only play if necessary.

Coach Warner announced that a patched up lineup would represent the Pitt Panthers against Lehigh. Quarterback Jimmy Dehart and guard John McLean would not start. Tackle Lou Mervis was in the hospital in Pittsburgh and neither end John McCrory nor fullback Jim Morrow made the trip. Harry Keck of The Gazette Times reported: "The reason for this makeshift lineup is plain. Warner is keeping his cripples out to give them a chance to get into as good shape as possible for the battle with W. & J. at Forbes Field next week."

Florent Gibson of The Pittsburgh Sunday Post described the action with his usual flair: "Turning what seemed destined to result in a scoreless tie, a drawn battle, into a glorious, scintillating, feverishly hilarious triumph, Pitt's wounded but indomitable Panthers – and Tom Davies – defeated a sturdy strong desperate Lehigh eleven on Taylor Stadium, this afternoon, 14 to 0 in the last seven minutes of play."

"Three times Pitt had the ball inside the Lehigh five-yard line but was unable to shove it across." In the second quarter, "Lehigh worked the ball to Pitt's five yard line in an aerial attack when Booth (Lehigh tackle) was caught kicking and a forty-seven yard penalty resulted. That penalty prevented Lehigh from scoring." "Finally, when darkness was closing in on the big crowd and rain began falling hard little Davies broke through the left side of the Lehigh line and ran 50 yards for the first score of the game." Andy Hastings kicked goal and Pitt led 7 to 0. Pitt kicked off and five plays later - "Davies intercepted Wysocki's forward pass on the 48-yard line and sped over the chalk marks to a touchdown." Hastings kicked goal and Pitt led 14 to 0. The game ended with Pitt in possession on the Lehigh 47-yard line.

The Pitt lineup for the game against Lehigh was Frank McDonald (left end), Harvey Harman (left tackle), Alex Meanor (left guard), Herb Stein (center), Oscar Kratzert (right guard), James Bond (right tackle), Cliff Brown (right end), Herb McCracken (quarterback), Tom Davies (left halfback), John Laughran (right halfback) and Andy Hastings (fullback). Substitutes appearing in the game for Pitt were Frank Eckert, Thomas Hamberger and William Horner. The game was played in 15-minute quarters.

=== Washington & Jefferson ===
Week 6: Washington & Jefferson at Pitt

Team	1	2	3	4	Total
W. & J.	0	0	0	6	6
• Pitt	0	7	0	0	7

- Date: November 8, 1919
- Location: Forbes Field
  Pittsburgh, PA
- Game start: 2:30 p.m.
- Game attendance: 30,000
- Game weather: clear and cold
- Referee: Nathan A. Tufts (Brown)

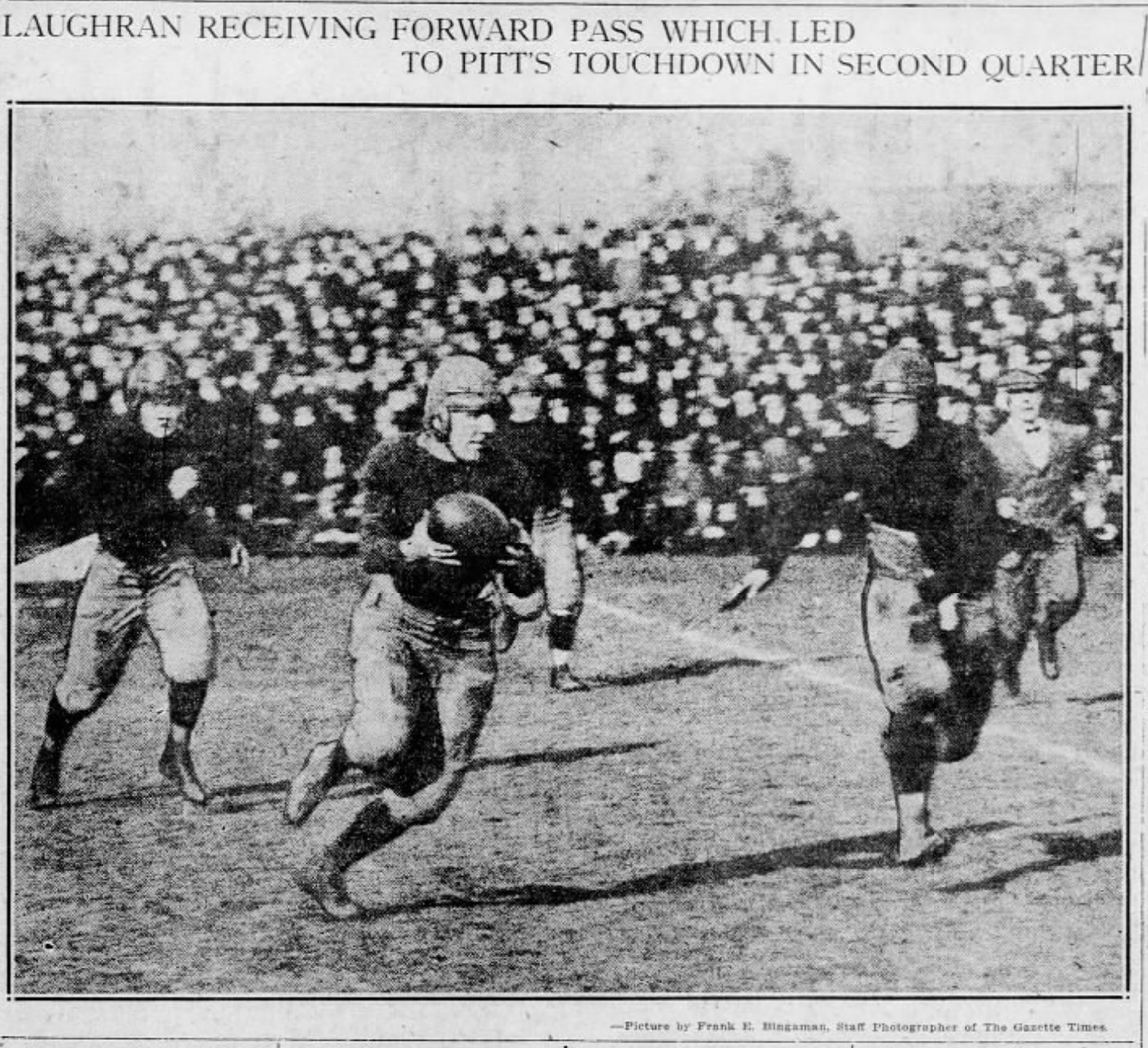
Pitt back John Laughran gaining yardage versus W. & J in 1919 game

The annual battle with Pitt's chief rival Washington & Jefferson took place November 8 on Forbes Field. Prior to the game, Pitt lodged a protest to the management of W. & J. that their All-American tackle, Wilbur “Fats” Henry, should not be allowed to play. Graduate Manager Karl E. Davis noted: "Henry has competed for four years in football for W. & J. against Pitt. The intercollegiate eligibility rules state specifically that the athletic time of any player is four years. Henry is therefore not eligible to compete for another or fifth year." The W. & J. management consented and Henry did not play.

On November 4 Harry Keck of The Gazette Times reported:

"Pittsburgh this morning is faced by the first really serious football ticket scandal in its history. With the Pitt-Wash-Jeff game slated for next Saturday, not a reserved seat ticket for it has been available for public purchase at any time, and it has been announced for several days that the supply of reserved seats has been completely exhausted. It was said that all reserved seats had been gobbled up by the students and alumni of the university and the students and alumni of Wash-Jeff. The public, which is very welcome at less pretentious games, has every bit as much right as the alumni to buy tickets for the big games. The Pitt games are public affairs, not private games for the mere delectation of Pitt students and alumni. So far as the public is concerned, it has every right to cry out against the outrageousness of its treatment, and to demand a squarer deal in the future or quit patronizing Pitt games."

For the third week in a row the Pitt eleven took on an undefeated, unscored upon opponent. W. & J. was led by David C. Morrow and had a 4–0 record with a 13–0 win over the same Syracuse team that defeated Pitt. The W. & J. lineup was intact except for Garbisch at tackle in place of All-American Henry.

The Gazette Times reported Saturday morning that the Pitt lineup was still not fully 100% healthy. John McCrory and Lou Mervis were out. Jim Morrow and Jimmy DeHart would play but sparingly. "Indications are that it will be clear and cold this afternoon, with the field in good shape. These are ideal football conditions."

After the game Florent Gibson of The Pittsburgh Sunday Post noted: "Outrushing their hereditary foemen from Washington and Jefferson by 317 yards to 165, registering 14 earned first downs to the Red and Black's eight, crashing against their foe's goal line on six separate occasions to the three visits Wash-Jeff made deep in Blue and Gold territory, the Panthers of Pitt had to be content with a purely nominal 7-to-6 victory in their annual meeting at Forbes Field yesterday."

Harry Keck of The Gazette Times was impressed with the crowd: "The game was witnessed by the largest crowd in the history of the collegiate sport in Pittsburgh, all the seats and standing room being sold in advance of the game. The attendance was variously estimated as being between 30,000 and 35,000."

The first quarter was scoreless but at the start of the second, Pitt forced W. & J. to punt. Andy Hastings caught the ball on the Pitt 44-yard line and returned "the ball 26 yards by a fine exhibition of broken field running. John Laughran got five around end, and Hastings plunged through the line for first down on W. & J.'s 23-yard line. After two more plays, Davies threw a forward pass to Laughran, putting the ball on W. & J.'s 4-yard line. Laughran fumbled the ball, but Harman recovered it. Davies made a yard at right end, and Hastings put the ball on the 1-yard line. On the next play Hastings went over for Pitt's first and only touchdown. Meanor and Harman making the hole for him. Hastings kicked the goal, and the score was 7 to 0 in Pitt's favor." For the next two and a half quarters, the ball went up and down the field but neither team could score. Late in the fourth quarter, Pitt held W. & J. on downs at their 14-yard line. Hastings attempted to punt out of danger and W. & J. end Carroll came through the line and blocked the punt, scooped it up and scored the touchdown. Russ Stein, W. & J. tackle and brother of Pitt center Herb Stein, attempted the goal kick. "As the kick went low, the cheers that went up from the Pitt adherents could have been heard for blocks around. The game was the Panthers'; they felt it; they knew it." Washington & Jefferson finished the season with 6—2 record.

The Pitt lineup for the game against Washington & Jefferson was Fred Ewing (left end), Harvey Harman (left tackle), Alex Meanor (left guard), Herb Stein (center), John McLean (right guard), James Bond (right tackle), Frank Eckert (right end), Herb McCracken (quarterback), Tom Davies (left halfback), Jimmy DeHart (right halfback) and Andy Hastings (fullback). Substitutes appearing in the game for Pitt were James Morrow, William Thomas and John Laughran. The game was played in 15-minute quarters.

=== At Penn ===
Week 7: Pitt at Penn

Team	1	2	3	4	Total
Pitt	0	3	0	0	3
Penn	3	0	0	0	3

- Date: November 15, 1919
- Location: Franklin Field
  Philadelphia, PA
- Game start: 2:00 p.m.
- Game attendance: 30,000
- Game weather: Ideal
- Referee: Nathan Tufts (Brown)

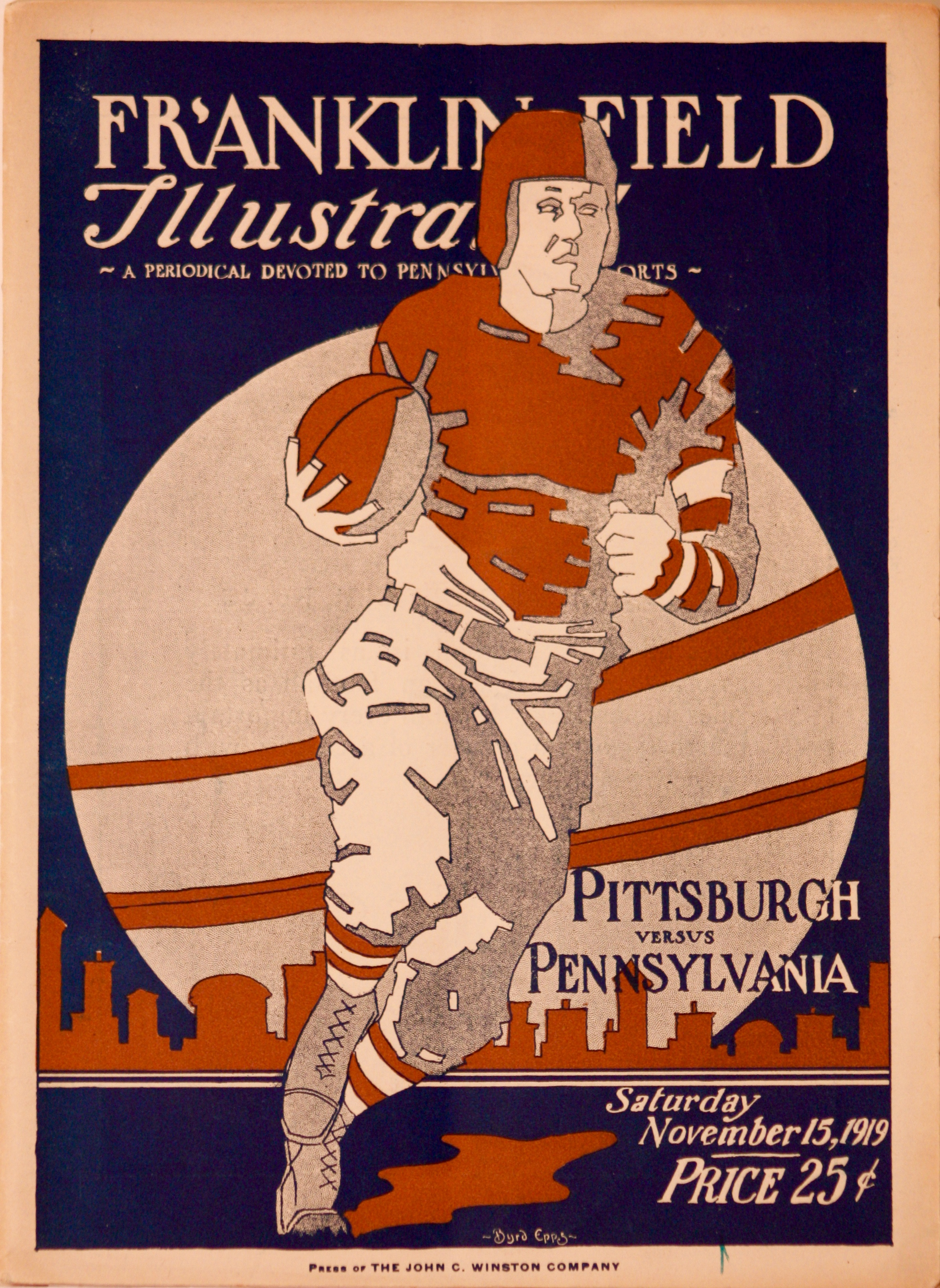
Franklin Field Illustrated for November 15, 1919 Pennsylvania vs. Pitt game

For the first season since 1903, the Pitt football team had a fourth road game. This Pennsylvania RR train ride was across the state to Philadelphia to play the Penn Quakers on Franklin Field. The Quakers were led by fourth year coach Bob Folwell and had a 5–2 record, having lost their last two games to Penn State and Dartmouth. The Quakers lineup featured Walter Camp first team All-American end Heinie Miller, team Captain and quarterback Bert Bell (future Commissioner of the NFL) and tackle Lou Little (future College Football Hall of Fame coach). The Quaker lineup for the Pitt game had two changes from the Dartmouth game. “Hopper will be at left end, in place of Ray Miller, and Maynard will be at left tackle, in place of Johnny Titzel.”

The Pitt band and several hundred rooters traveled with the squad. "All the reserved seat tickets for the game have been sold and one of the largest crowds that ever stormed Franklin Field for football is certain to be on hand to witness the battle." The Panther lineup was still missing Mervis at tackle and Jimmy DeHart made the trip but could not play due to an ankle injury.

The Philadelphia Inquirer told it best:

"The ferocious Panther of Pittsburgh and the Fighting Quaker of Franklin Field battled each other to a three to three deadlock yesterday before the largest crowd that ever saw Penn play football on her gridiron. No less than 30,000 pairs of eyes were focused on Captain Bert Bell when he drop-kicked a field goal from the 36-yard line for Penn's three points. This feat came before the game had been in progress five minutes. In the middle of the second period, all but a few of those same 30,000 fanatics were chagrined when (Andy) Hastings, the big Panther full-back, tied up the score by booting a placement goal from the 38-yard line. These two scores represented the fruits of the offensive strength of both teams." The game then turned into a kicking duel, but neither kicker was reliable. Bell missed four drop-kicks and Hastings flubbed three from placement. "More spectacular games have been played in Franklin Field, but never did two great teams, evenly matched, fight with greater courage or more dogged determination."

Ralph Davis of The Pittsburg Press noted: "While today's tie score breaks the string of consecutive Pitt victories, the Panthers still have the record of being undefeated in five games with the Quakers." Penn finished the season with a 6–2–1 record.

Edwin J. Pollock in the Evening Public Ledger reported: "The game was hard played from the beginning. It meant much to both teams and perhaps a bit more to Pennsylvania than to Pittsburgh. There was terrific driving and plunging, smashing tackling and courageous individual work all through the 60 minutes of struggling; but despite all this, it was one of the cleanest contests ever staged in the history of the time-honored Penn Stadium. The teams from the two ends of the Keystone state have met five times, and those games have been splendid examples of how football should be played in the sense of clean sport."

The Pitt lineup for the game against Penn was Herb McCracken (left end), Harvey Harman (left tackle), Alex Meanor (left guard), Herb Stein (center), John McLean (right guard), James Bond (right tackle), Alvar Ginn (right end), James Morrow (quarterback), Tom Davies (left halfback), John Laughran (right halfback) and Andy Hastings (fullback). Substitutes appearing in the game for Pitt were Alvar Ginn, W. J. Thomas, W. Cullen Gourley, and Fred Ewing. The game was played in 15-minute quarters.

=== Carnegie Tech ===
Week 8: Carnegie Tech at Pitt

Team	1	2	3	4	Total
Carnegie Tech	0	7	0	0	7
• Pitt	0	0	7	10	17

- Date: November 22, 1919
- Location: Forbes Field
  Pittsburgh, PA
- Game start: 2:30 p.m.
- Referee: S. Audley McFarland (Wash-Jeff)

The ninth edition of the Pittsburgh City Championship game was played on November 22. "There will be a lot of noise making at Forbes Field on Saturday, according to the plans of the rival student bodies. The Tech band will be on hand in all its glory, and the Pitt band will also be there to help along. The Pitt students, under Cheer Leader 'Jim' Scott, have been doing wonderfully this fall in the way of encouraging their gridiron representatives, and will be keyed up to a high pitch on Saturday."

Fifth-year coach Walter Steffen's Tartans of Carnegie Tech had a 3–3 record prior to the City Championship Game against the Panthers. "Tech is rested up and in good shape physically...Tech will be able to play itself out today, as the game is its last of the season. Tech will use its best lineup, with the exception of Abe Levy, the quarterback, who is out because of injuries received in an automobile accident. Loomis will start in his place."

"The Pitt team is more or less of an uncertain quantity, even at this late date. 'Pop' probably never in his career had to deal with as many cripples as he has had to work with this fall, and his team has been a constant experiment." At game time Coach Warner decided to start his substitutes, with John Laughran, the only player who started against Penn, in the lineup.

The Pittsburg Press reported: "The Pitt Panther is still football champion of Pittsburgh. Warner's wild animals proved it yesterday in their annual game with Carnegie Tech at Forbes Field, which they won by the score of 17 to 7."

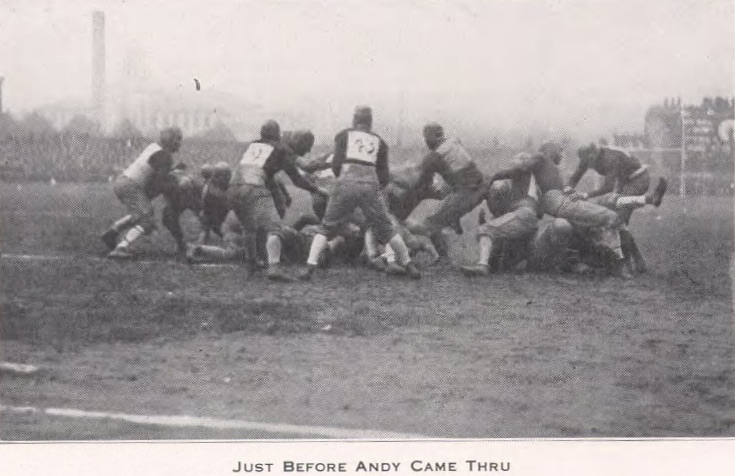
1919 Pitt football game action

After a scoreless first quarter, the Pitt offense advanced the ball into Tech territory but were stopped on the 18-yard line. A field goal was attempted by Gus Aschman but it went awry and was caught by Tech halfback Marshall on the Tech seven-yard line. He stopped running ninety-three yards later and placed the ball under the goal posts. Fletcher kicked goal and Tech led 7–0 at halftime. Coach Warner sent in the first string for the second half. "The regular men stopped Tech and opened the way for Andy Hastings, Davies and Morrow to carry the ball to the 5-yard line, from which point Hastings went over. Davies kicked goal." The third period ended with the score tied at seven. Pitt advanced the ball to the Tech 15-yard line early in the fourth quarter. Andy Hastings made six yards on two downs and James Morrow added four for a first down on the five. Hastings carried it over the goal on second down and then kicked goal. Pitt led 14-7. Late in the quarter the Pitt offense worked the ball to the Tech 21-yard line where the Tech defense stiffened. Tom Davies dropped back to the 28-yard line and kicked a field goal to close out the scoring. Pitt 17 to Tech 7.

The Pittsburgh Sunday Post was disgusted with the behavior of the Pitt student section. Sportswriter “Reggy” reported:

"Scenes bordering on riot prevailed during the intermission between halves, when with the Tech team leading by the score of 7 to 0, the Pitt students occupying the left field bleachers, rushed onto the field, toward the flag pole and made an attempt to drag down the Tech flag which had been flying triumphantly from the flag pole. Numbering several hundred and led by three unidentified persons the Pitt crowd stormed the pole, when the Tech boys rallied together, and then came the fireworks. Bricks, sticks, stones and fists flew for many minutes in a grand free-for-all. Policemen from all parts of the enclosure rushed to the scene and with drawn clubs fought their way through the crowd, and after a lively tussle restored order....And through it all the Tech banner, which had been the cause of the uprising, continued to fly until the conclusion of the game."

The Pitt lineup for the game against Carnegie Tech was Frank McDonald (left end), W. Cullen Gourley (left tackle), W. J. Thomas (left guard), Alvar Ginn (center), Oscar Kratzert (right guard), Louis Markowitz (right tackle), Adolph Herskowitz (right end), Thomas Hamberger (quarterback), Gus Achman (left halfback), John Laughran (right halfback) and Abe Bremen (fullback). Substitutes appearing in the game for Pitt were Herb McCracken, James Morrow, Tom Davies, Andy Hastings, Herb Stein, Alex Meanor, Fred Ewing, James Bond, Frank Masley, Bernard Peters, Harold Krotzer and John McLean. The game was played in 15-minute quarters.

=== Penn State ===
Week 9: Penn State at Pitt

Team	1	2	3	4	Total
• Penn State	7	6	7	0	20
Pitt	0	0	0	0	0

- Date: November 27, 1919
- Location: Forbes Field
  Pittsburgh, PA
- Game start: 2:30 p.m.
- Game attendance: 25,000
- Referee: J. A. Evans (Williams)

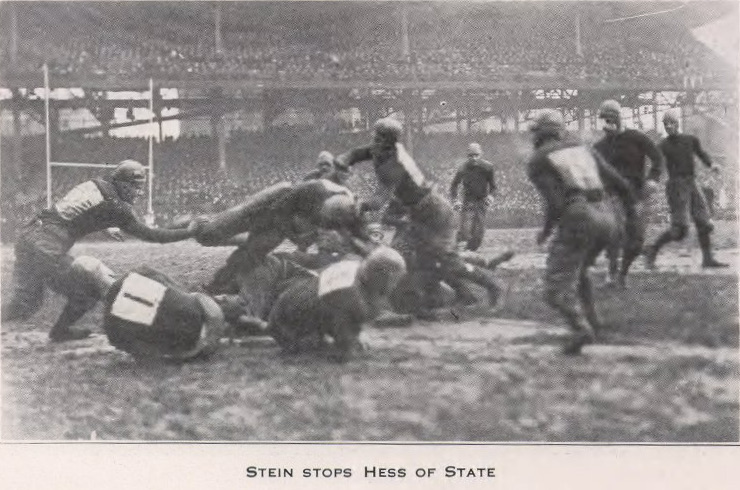
Herb Stein tackles Hess of Penn State in 1919 game

The 1919 Penn State Lions were led by second year coach Hugo Bezdek and sported a 6–1 record. Their only loss was to a strong (6–1–1) Dartmouth eleven. "The team that is most likely to start against Pitt included (halfback) Charlie Way...and he appeared to be back in his old form and entirely recovered from his shoulder injury. This greatly boosted State's hopes for a victorious Thanksgiving." 1919 Walter Camp first team All-American end [Bob Higgins (American football)|Bob Higgins] anchored their line.

Captain Jimmy DeHart and James Morrow were declared ineligible for the Penn State game by the University of Pittsburgh faculty. DeHart was still injured but Morrow was slated to start at quarterback. Coach Warner decided "McCracken will start at quarterback in Morrow's place, as he has done a few times and Speedo Laughran, DeHart's regular understudy, will be in at right halfback again. Eckert will start at left end in place of McCracken, Thomas will be at tackle in place of the injured Bond, and the balance of the team will consist of the regulars at the positions."

According to The Pittsburg Press on Saturday, November 22 : "The University of Pittsburgh football management has been notified by United States government officials that internal revenue inspectors are awake to the situation in regard to speculating in tickets for the Pitt-Penn State game next Thursday, and that they are going to conduct a real campaign clear up the 'scalpers.' Government officers in plain clothes will patrol the Oakland section next Thursday, as well as all of downtown hotels, and declare they will arrest all offenders of the law."

Ralph S. Davis of The Pittsburg Press reported: "It's a case of 'wait till next year' with the Pitt football followers. They watched their favorites go down to defeat yesterday at Forbes Field by the count of 20 to 0 before the onslaught of Hugo Bezdek's powerful Penn State machine, and their only solace was that 1920 might tell another story. Yesterday's victory was the first for the Center Countians here since away back in 1912. Six straight times had the state boys invaded Pittsburgh - often brimful of confidence – only to return home beaten but not disgraced."

Pitt received the kick-off and advanced the ball to the Penn State 6-yard line before losing the ball on downs. State dropped into punt formation. "However, from behind his own goal line, (Harold) Hess, instead of kicking, made a forward pass to (Bob) Higgins, and the latter ran 75 yards for a touchdown. That gave State the jump, and they outplayed the locals practically all the way.” (Bob) Cubbage kicked goal and Penn State led 7–0. In the second quarter (Larry) Conover of State lined up for a field goal from the 37-yard line and, he too, threw a pass for a first down on the 20-yard line. Seven plays later Hess bulled into the end zone from the 2-yard line. Conover missed the goal. Halftime score, State 13, Pitt 0.

"Another State touchdown was the result of a long ramble. It was the third score and came soon after the second half began. It was after Andy (Hastings) had punted and it was State's ball on the Pitt 47-yard line. On the first play, (Charley) Way went flashing through the Pitt line for a 53 yard gain and touchdown." Conover kicked goal to reach the final score of 20–0.

Pitt was out gained in total yards from scrimmage 372–81 and Penn State earned 13 first downs to four for Pitt.

Francis B. Ketchum of The Pittsburgh Post reported that Glenn Warner was most gracious after the defeat: "'Congratulations Hugo!' was Glenn Warner's greeting in the Penn State boudoir after the game. 'You have a first class team and can certainly say that your lads won on their merits.'"

Ralph S. Davis of The Pittsburg Press noted: "The relations between these two schools have always been very friendly, and the feeling yesterday was kindly throughout. There was none of the bitterness which characterized the Pitt-Carnegie game, and the students of both institutions conducted themselves like gentlemen."

The Pitt lineup for the game against Penn State was Cliff Brown (left end), Harvey Harman (left tackle), Alex Meanor (left guard), Herb Stein (center), John McLean (right guard), James Bond (right tackle), Fred Ewing (right end), Herb McCracken (quarterback), Tom Davies (left halfback), John Laughran (right halfback) and Andy Hastings (fullback). Substitutes appearing in the game for Pitt were W. Cullen Gourley, Frank Eckert, Oscar Kratzert, W. J. Thomas, Louis Markowitz, Gus Aschman and Abe Breman. The game was played in 15-minute quarters.

== Scoring summary ==
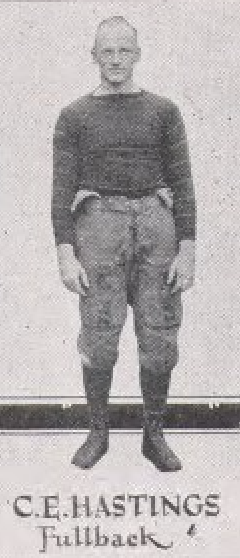
Andy Hastings

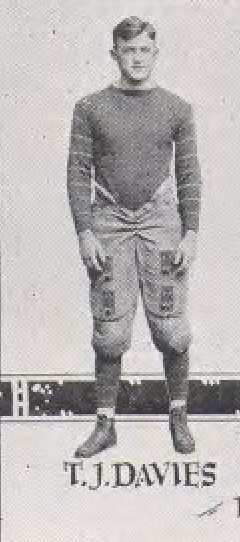
Tom Davies

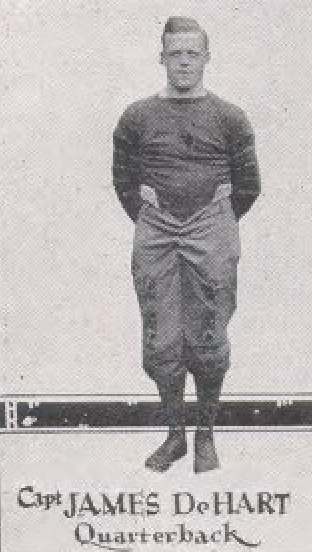
James DeHart

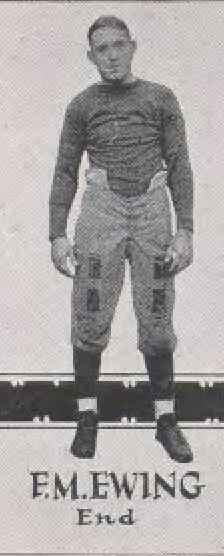
Fred Ewing

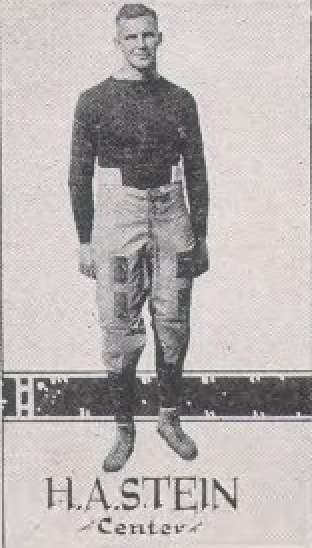
Herb Stein

1919 Pittsburgh Panthers scoring summary
Player	Touchdowns	Extra points	Field goals	Safety	Points
Andy Hastings	8	10	2	0	64
Tom Davies	3	1	2	0	25
Jimmy DeHart	3	0	0	0	18
Fred Ewing	1	0	0	0	6
Herb Stein	1	0	0	0	6
Totals	16	11	4	0	119

== Postseason ==
Center Herb Stein was elected Captain for the 1920 season on the third ballot at the annual football banquet. Tom Davies was the runner-up. The following players received the varsity "P" for the 1919 season: James DeHart, Tom Davies, Andy Hastings, James Morrow, Fred Ewing, Frank Eckert, Harvey Harman, James Bond, John McLean, Alex Meanor, Herb Stein, John Laughran, G. Herb McCracken, Thomas Hamberger, Abe Breman, Cliff Brown, John McCrory, W. J. Thomas, Oscar Kratzert, Alvar Ginn, Gus Aschman, Lou Mervis and W. J. Foster.

R. G. "Bob" Eckhardt, a junior in the School of Economics, was appointed student manager of football for the 1920 season.

=== All-American selections ===
- Herb Stein center (All-American mention from Chester L. Smith of the Pittsburgh Dispatch)
- Tom Davies halfback (All- Eastern mention from Frank G. Menke, sporting editor of Newspaper Feature Service, Ray McCarthy of the New York Tribune, and Robert W. Maxwell, sporting editor, of the Philadelphia Evening-Ledger.)
