= 1919 Chattanooga Moccasins football team =

American college football season

1919 Chattanooga Moccasins football
- Conference: Independent
- Record: 3–5–1
- Head coach: Silas Williams (1st season)
- Captain: Ernest Eldridge
- Home stadium: Chamberlain Field

1919 Southern college football independents records
| | Conf. | | | Overall |
| Team | W | L | T | W | | L | | T |
|---|---|---|---|---|---|---|---|---|
| Marshall | | – | | 8 | – | 0 | – | 0 |
| Southern College | | – | | 5 | – | 0 | – | 0 |
| Middle Tennessee State Normal | | – | | 4 | – | 0 | – | 0 |
| Phillips | | – | | 10 | – | 0 | – | 1 |
| Navy | | – | | 7 | – | 1 | – | 0 |
| West Virginia | | – | | 8 | – | 2 | – | 0 |
| Mississippi Normal | | – | | 4 | – | 1 | – | 2 |
| Presbyterian | | – | | 4 | – | 3 | – | 2 |
| North Texas State Normal | | – | | 5 | – | 3 | – | 0 |
| Birmingham–Southern | | – | | 4 | – | 3 | – | 0 |
| Abilene Christian | | – | | 2 | – | 2 | – | 0 |
| Southwest Texas State | | – | | 4 | – | 4 | – | 0 |
| Spring Hill | | – | | 3 | – | 3 | – | 1 |
| Stetson | | – | | 4 | – | 4 | – | 0 |
| West Tennessee State Normal | | – | | 3 | – | 4 | – | 0 |
| Chattanooga | | – | | 3 | – | 5 | – | 1 |
| Marion | | – | | 3 | – | 6 | – | 0 |
| Texas Mines | | – | | 2 | – | 4 | – | 0 |
| Delaware | | – | | 2 | – | 5 | – | 1 |
| Oglethorpe | | – | | 2 | – | 6 | – | 1 |
| Wake Forest | | – | | 2 | – | 6 | – | 0 |
| Sam Houston Normal | | – | | 0 | – | 7 | – | 0 |

The 1919 Chattanooga Moccasins football team represented the University of Chattanooga (now known as the University of Tennessee at Chattanooga) as an independent during the 1919 college football season. In their first season under head coach Silas Williams, the Moccasins completed its nine-game schedule with a record of 3–5–1.

== Schedule ==
| Date | Time | Opponent | Site | Result | Source |
|---|---|---|---|---|---|
| September 26 | | at Bryson College | Fayetteville, TN | T 0–0 | |
| October 3 | | Tusculum | Chamberlain Field; Chattanooga, TN | W 9–7 | |
| October 11 | | Oglethorpe | Chamberlain Field; Chattanooga, TN | L 0–19 | |
| October 18 | 3:00 p.m. | Middle Tennessee State Normal | Chamberlain Field; Chattanooga, TN | L 0–49 | |
| November 1 | | at Georgetown (KY) | Georgetown, KY | L 0–53 | |
| November 8 | | Cumberland (TN) | Chamberlain Field; Chattanooga, TN | W 7–0 | |
| November 15 | | Carson–Newman | Chamberlain Field; Chattanooga, TN | W 20–0 | |
| November 22 | | at Birmingham–Southern | Munger Field; Birmingham, AL | L 0–40 | |
| November 27 | | Transylvania | Chamberlain Field; Chattanooga, TN | L 0–14 | |
All times are in Eastern time
