= 1919 Wake Forest Baptists football team =

American college football season

1919 Wake Forest Baptists football
- Conference: Independent
- Record: 2–6
- Head coach: Harry Rabenhorst (2nd season)
- Captain: Harry Rabenhorst

1919 Southern college football independents records
	Conf.			Overall
Team	W	L	T	W		L		T
Marshall		–		8	–	0	–	0
Southern College		–		5	–	0	–	0
Middle Tennessee State Normal		–		4	–	0	–	0
Phillips		–		10	–	0	–	1
Navy		–		7	–	1	–	0
West Virginia		–		8	–	2	–	0
Mississippi Normal		–		4	–	1	–	2
Presbyterian		–		4	–	3	–	2
North Texas State Normal		–		5	–	3	–	0
Birmingham–Southern		–		4	–	3	–	0
Abilene Christian		–		2	–	2	–	0
Southwest Texas State		–		4	–	4	–	0
Spring Hill		–		3	–	3	–	1
Stetson		–		4	–	4	–	0
West Tennessee State Normal		–		3	–	4	–	0
Chattanooga		–		3	–	5	–	1
Marion		–		3	–	6	–	0
Texas Mines		–		2	–	4	–	0
Delaware		–		2	–	5	–	1
Oglethorpe		–		2	–	6	–	1
Wake Forest		–		2	–	6	–	0
Sam Houston Normal		–		0	–	7	–	0

The 1919 Wake Forest Baptists football team was an American football team that represented Wake Forest College (now known as Wake Forest University) as an independent during the 1919 college football season. In their second year under head coach Harry Rabenhorst, the team compiled a 2–6 record.

== Schedule ==
Date	Time	Opponent	Site	Result	Source
September 26		Davidson	Wake Forest, NC	L 0–21	
October 4		at Georgia Tech	Grant Field; Atlanta, GA	L 0–14	
October 18		at North Carolina	Emerson Field; Chapel Hill, NC (rivalry)	L 0–6	
October 25	4:00 p.m.	at Furman	Manly Field; Greenville, SC	L 0–6	
November 1		at Sewanee Club	League Park; Portsmouth, VA	W 39–3	
November 8		at VPI	Miles Field; Blacksburg, VA	L 0–40	
November 15		Guilford	Wake Forest, NC	W 65–0	
November 27		at NC State	Riddick Stadium; Raleigh, NC (rivalry)	L 7–21	
All times are in Eastern time
