= 1919 Birmingham–Southern Panthers football team =

American college football season

1919 Birmingham–Southern Panthers football
- Conference: Independent
- Record: 4–3
- Head coach: Charles H. Brown (1st season)
- Home stadium: Munger Field

1919 Southern college football independents records
	Conf.			Overall
Team	W	L	T	W		L		T
Marshall		–		8	–	0	–	0
Southern College		–		5	–	0	–	0
Middle Tennessee State Normal		–		4	–	0	–	0
Phillips		–		10	–	0	–	1
Navy		–		7	–	1	–	0
West Virginia		–		8	–	2	–	0
Mississippi Normal		–		4	–	1	–	2
Presbyterian		–		4	–	3	–	2
North Texas State Normal		–		5	–	3	–	0
Birmingham–Southern		–		4	–	3	–	0
Abilene Christian		–		2	–	2	–	0
Southwest Texas State		–		4	–	4	–	0
Spring Hill		–		3	–	3	–	1
Stetson		–		4	–	4	–	0
West Tennessee State Normal		–		3	–	4	–	0
Chattanooga		–		3	–	5	–	1
Marion		–		3	–	6	–	0
Texas Mines		–		2	–	4	–	0
Delaware		–		2	–	5	–	1
Oglethorpe		–		2	–	6	–	1
Wake Forest		–		2	–	6	–	0
Sam Houston Normal		–		0	–	7	–	0

The 1919 Birmingham–Southern Panthers football team was an American football team that represented Birmingham–Southern College as an independent during the 1919 college football season. In their first season under head coach Charles H. Brown, the team compiled a 4–3 record.

== Schedule ==
Date	Opponent	Site	Result	Attendance	Source
September 27	Hamilton (AL)	Munger Field; Birmingham, AL	W 66–0		
October 4	at Alabama	University Field; Tuscaloosa, AL	L 0–27	2,000	
October 17	at Marion	Marion, AL	W 25–0		
October 25	Southern Military Academy	Munger Field; Birmingham, AL	W 28–0		
November 9	vs. Howard (AL)	Rickwood Field; Birmingham, AL	L 0–2		
November 15	at Spring Hill	Mobile, AL	L 0–3		
November 22	Chattanooga	Munger Field; Birmingham, AL	W 40–0		
