= 1919 Presbyterian Blue Hose football team =

American college football season

1919 Presbyterian Blue Hose football
- Conference: Independent
- Record: 4–3–2
- Head coach: Walter A. Johnson (4th season)
- Captain: J. Y. Richardson

1919 Southern college football independents records
	Conf.			Overall
Team	W	L	T	W		L		T
Marshall		–		8	–	0	–	0
Southern College		–		5	–	0	–	0
Middle Tennessee State Normal		–		4	–	0	–	0
Phillips		–		10	–	0	–	1
Navy		–		7	–	1	–	0
West Virginia		–		8	–	2	–	0
Mississippi Normal		–		4	–	1	–	2
Presbyterian		–		4	–	3	–	2
North Texas State Normal		–		5	–	3	–	0
Birmingham–Southern		–		4	–	3	–	0
Abilene Christian		–		2	–	2	–	0
Southwest Texas State		–		4	–	4	–	0
Spring Hill		–		3	–	3	–	1
Stetson		–		4	–	4	–	0
West Tennessee State Normal		–		3	–	4	–	0
Chattanooga		–		3	–	5	–	1
Marion		–		3	–	6	–	0
Texas Mines		–		2	–	4	–	0
Delaware		–		2	–	5	–	1
Oglethorpe		–		2	–	6	–	1
Wake Forest		–		2	–	6	–	0
Sam Houston Normal		–		0	–	7	–	0

The 1919 Presbyterian Blue Hose football team represented Presbyterian College as an independent during the 1919 college football season. Led by the fourth-year head coach Walter A. Johnson, Presbyterian compiled a record of 4–3–2. The team captain was J. Y. Richardson.

== Schedule ==
Date	Time	Opponent	Site	Result	Source
September 27		at South Carolina	College Park; Columbia, SC	W 6–0	
October 10		Bailey Military Institute	Clinton, SC	W 40–0	
October 18	4:00 p.m.	at Furman	Manly Field; Greenville, SC	L 0–6	
October 25		at The Citadel	College Park Stadium; Charleston, SC	L 7–12	
October 31		Erskine	Clinton, SC	W 33–7	
November 7		at Clemson	Riggs Field; Calhoun, SC	L 7–19	
November 14		Wofford	Clinton, SC	W 14–6	
November 21		at Davidson	Sprunt Field; Davidson, NC	T 0–0	
November 27		at Newberry	Newberry, SC	T 0–0	
All times are in Eastern time
