= 1919 Phillips Haymakers football team =

American college football season

1919 Phillips Haymakers football
- Conference: Independent
- Record: 10–0–1
- Head coach: John Maulbetsch (3rd season)
- Home stadium: Alton Field

1919 Southern college football independents records
	Conf.			Overall
Team	W	L	T	W		L		T
Marshall		–		8	–	0	–	0
Southern College		–		5	–	0	–	0
Middle Tennessee State Normal		–		4	–	0	–	0
Phillips		–		10	–	0	–	1
Navy		–		7	–	1	–	0
West Virginia		–		8	–	2	–	0
Mississippi Normal		–		4	–	1	–	2
Presbyterian		–		4	–	3	–	2
North Texas State Normal		–		5	–	3	–	0
Birmingham–Southern		–		4	–	3	–	0
Abilene Christian		–		2	–	2	–	0
Southwest Texas State		–		4	–	4	–	0
Spring Hill		–		3	–	3	–	1
Stetson		–		4	–	4	–	0
West Tennessee State Normal		–		3	–	4	–	0
Chattanooga		–		3	–	5	–	1
Marion		–		3	–	6	–	0
Texas Mines		–		2	–	4	–	0
Delaware		–		2	–	5	–	1
Oglethorpe		–		2	–	6	–	1
Wake Forest		–		2	–	6	–	0
Sam Houston Normal		–		0	–	7	–	0

The 1919 Phillips Haymakers football team represented Phillips University during the 1919 college football season. John Maulbetsch arranged a game against the Texas Longhorns in 1919, the first meeting between the schools. When the game was announced The San Antonio Light reported: "Phillips University has one of the strongest teams in the Southwest. The only team to beat them in the past two years is Oklahoma and last year Phillips beat the Sooners 13–7." The report credited Maulbetsch for securing success at an institution little known in athletics before he arrived. The University of Texas had not lost a game since 1917 when the Phillips "Haymakers" arrived in Austin, Texas on October 11, 1919. Maulbetsch's team shocked the Longhorns, holding them scoreless and winning the contest, 10–0. One Texas newspaper reported that Phillips had "whitewashed the Longhorns in their own corral."

Players included Dutch Strauss.

== Schedule ==
Date	Time	Opponent	Site	Result	Attendance	Source
September 26		Kingfisher	Alton Field; Enid, OK	W 90–0		
October 3		Northwestern Normal (OK)	Alton Field; Enid, OK	W 26–0		
October 11		at Texas	Clark Field; Austin, TX	W 10–0		
October 14		at Southeastern Normal (OK)	Durant, OK	W 47–0		
October 24		Southwestern Normal (OK)	Alton Field; Enid, OK	W 86–0		
October 31		at Central State Teachers	Edmond, OK	W 54–0		
November 8		Texas Wesleyan	Alton Field; Enid, OK	W 21–0		
November 15		at Oklahoma A&M	Lewis Field; Stillwater, OK	T 7–7		
November 18		Haskell	Alton Field; Enid, OK	W 21–7	4,500	
November 27	2:30 p.m.	Denver	High school grounds; Enid, OK	W 58–0		
		Wesley College		W 21–0		
All times are in Central time
