= 1919 Sam Houston Normal football team =

American college football season

1919 Sam Houston Normal football
- Conference: Independent
- Record: 0–7
- Head coach: Gene Berry (5th season)
- Home stadium: Pritchett Field

1919 Southern college football independents records
	Conf.			Overall
Team	W	L	T	W		L		T
Marshall		–		8	–	0	–	0
Southern College		–		5	–	0	–	0
Middle Tennessee State Normal		–		4	–	0	–	0
Phillips		–		10	–	0	–	1
Navy		–		7	–	1	–	0
West Virginia		–		8	–	2	–	0
Mississippi Normal		–		4	–	1	–	2
Presbyterian		–		4	–	3	–	2
North Texas State Normal		–		5	–	3	–	0
Birmingham–Southern		–		4	–	3	–	0
Abilene Christian		–		2	–	2	–	0
Southwest Texas State		–		4	–	4	–	0
Spring Hill		–		3	–	3	–	1
Stetson		–		4	–	4	–	0
West Tennessee State Normal		–		3	–	4	–	0
Chattanooga		–		3	–	5	–	1
Marion		–		3	–	6	–	0
Texas Mines		–		2	–	4	–	0
Delaware		–		2	–	5	–	1
Oglethorpe		–		2	–	6	–	1
Wake Forest		–		2	–	6	–	0
Sam Houston Normal		–		0	–	7	–	0

The 1919 Sam Houston Normal football team represented Sam Houston Normal Institute (now known as Sam Houston State University) as an independent during the 1919 college football season. Led by fifth-year head coach Gene Berry, Sam Houston compiled an overall record of 0–7.

== Schedule ==
Date	Opponent	Site	Result	Source
October 3	at Texas A&M	Kyle Field; College Station, TX	L 0–77	
October 10	Palestine YMCA	Pritchett Field; Huntsville, TX	L 0–7	
October 18	Houston High School	Pritchett Field; Huntsville, TX	L 0–13	
October 24	at Southwest Texas State	Evans Field; San Marcos, TX (rivalry)	L 0–32	
November 7	American Legion	Pritchett Field; Huntsville, TX	L 6–13	
November 17	Southwest Texas State	Pritchett Field; Huntsville, TX	L 0–7	
November 27	at East Texas State	Commerce, TX	L 7–21	
