= Dutch Strauss =

American football player (1897–1969)

Profile
- Position: Fullback

Personal information
- Born: January 7, 1897; Hennessey, Oklahoma, U.S.
- Died: August 18, 1969 (aged 72); Enid, Oklahoma, U.S.
- Listed height: 5 ft 10 in (1.78 m)
- Listed weight: 205 lb (93 kg)

Career information
- High school: Enid (OK)
- College: Phillips

Career history
- Toledo Maroons (1923); Kansas City Blues (1924)

Career statistics
- Games: 13
- Stats at Pro Football Reference

Arthur J. "Dutch" Strauss (January 7, 1897 – August 18, 1969) was an American football player and coach, newspaper executive, and politician.

Strauss was born in the Oklahoma Territory in 1897. He was raised in Bluff City, Kansas, where his father owned a general store.

Strauss played college football at William Jewell College before serving as a pilot during World War I. After the war, he played college football as a fullback for Phillips and was a member of the 1919 Phillips Haymakers football team that compiled a 10–0–1, including victories over Texas and Oklahoma A&M. He also played professional football as a fullback for the Toledo Maroons (1923) and Kansas City Blues (1924) in the National Football League (NFL). He appeared in 13 NFL games, 10 as a starter, during the 1923 and 1924 seasons.

Strauss later coached football at Chickasha High School. He served in the Oklahoma House of Representatives from 1926 to 1927. He then worked in the newspaper business in Enid, Oklahoma. He was the managing editor of The Endi Daily Eagle and Morning News for 39 years.
