= 1919 Mississippi Normal Normalites football team =

American college football season

1919 Mississippi Normal Normalites football
- Conference: Independent
- Record: 4–1–2
- Head coach: Cephus Anderson (1st season)
- Home stadium: Kamper Park

1919 Southern college football independents records
	Conf.			Overall
Team	W	L	T	W		L		T
Marshall		–		8	–	0	–	0
Southern College		–		5	–	0	–	0
Middle Tennessee State Normal		–		4	–	0	–	0
Phillips		–		10	–	0	–	1
Navy		–		7	–	1	–	0
West Virginia		–		8	–	2	–	0
Mississippi Normal		–		4	–	1	–	2
Presbyterian		–		4	–	3	–	2
North Texas State Normal		–		5	–	3	–	0
Birmingham–Southern		–		4	–	3	–	0
Abilene Christian		–		2	–	2	–	0
Southwest Texas State		–		4	–	4	–	0
Spring Hill		–		3	–	3	–	1
Stetson		–		4	–	4	–	0
West Tennessee State Normal		–		3	–	4	–	0
Chattanooga		–		3	–	5	–	1
Marion		–		3	–	6	–	0
Texas Mines		–		2	–	4	–	0
Delaware		–		2	–	5	–	1
Oglethorpe		–		2	–	6	–	1
Wake Forest		–		2	–	6	–	0
Sam Houston Normal		–		0	–	7	–	0

The 1919 Mississippi Normal Normalites football team was an American football team that represented Mississippi Normal College (now known as the University of Southern Mississippi) as an independent during the 1919 college football season. In their first year under head coach Cephus Anderson, the team compiled a 4–1–2 record.

== Schedule ==
Date	Opponent	Site	Result	Source
October 4	Perkinston High School	Kamper Park; Hattiesburg, MS	W 12–0	
October 18	Poplarville High School	Kamper Park; Hattiesburg, MS	W 2–0	
October 25	at Meridian College	Meridian, MS	T 6–6	
November 1	Gulf Coast Military Academy	Kamper Park; Hattiesburg, MS	T 6–6	
November 8	Chamberlain Hunt Academy	Kamper Park; Hattiesburg, MS	W 20–0	
November 17	Mississippi College	Kamper Park; Hattiesburg, MS	L 7–20	
November 27	Meridian College	Kamper Park; Hattiesburg, MS	W 47–0	
