= 1919 North Texas State Normal football team =

American college football season

1919 North Texas State Normal football
- Conference: Independent
- Record: 5–3
- Head coach: James W. St. Clair (5th season)
- Home stadium: Eagle Field

1919 Southern college football independents records
	Conf.			Overall
Team	W	L	T	W		L		T
Marshall		–		8	–	0	–	0
Southern College		–		5	–	0	–	0
Middle Tennessee State Normal		–		4	–	0	–	0
Phillips		–		10	–	0	–	1
Navy		–		7	–	1	–	0
West Virginia		–		8	–	2	–	0
Mississippi Normal		–		4	–	1	–	2
Presbyterian		–		4	–	3	–	2
North Texas State Normal		–		5	–	3	–	0
Birmingham–Southern		–		4	–	3	–	0
Abilene Christian		–		2	–	2	–	0
Southwest Texas State		–		4	–	4	–	0
Spring Hill		–		3	–	3	–	1
Stetson		–		4	–	4	–	0
West Tennessee State Normal		–		3	–	4	–	0
Chattanooga		–		3	–	5	–	1
Marion		–		3	–	6	–	0
Texas Mines		–		2	–	4	–	0
Delaware		–		2	–	5	–	1
Oglethorpe		–		2	–	6	–	1
Wake Forest		–		2	–	6	–	0
Sam Houston Normal		–		0	–	7	–	0

The 1919 North Texas State Normal football team represented North Texas State Normal College (now known as the University of North Texas) as an independent during the 1919 college football season. Led by fifth-year head coach James W. St. Clair, the squad compiled an overall record of 5–3.

== Schedule ==
Date	Time	Opponent	Site	Result	Source
October 4		at TCU	TCU campus; Fort Worth, TX	W 14–6	
October 11		Dallas	Eagle Field; Denton, TX	W 87–6	
October 18		at Tarleton Agricultural College	Stephenville, TX	W 44–0	
October 25		Southeastern Oklahoma Normal	Eagle Field; Denton, TX	W 53–6	
November 1	4:30 p.m.	at Simmons	Parramore Field; Abilene, TX	L 0–23	
November 8		Burleson	Eagle Field; Denton, TX	L 0–16	
November 15		at Austin	Cashion Field; Sherman, TX	L 0–1	
November 22		at Central State Normal	Edmond, OK	W 35–6	
All times are in Central time
