= 1919 Southern College Blue and White football team =

American college football season

1919 Southern College Blue and White football
- Conference: Independent
- Record: 5–0
- Head coach: Elbert M. Fulton (1st season)

1919 Southern college football independents records
	Conf.			Overall
Team	W	L	T	W		L		T
Marshall		–		8	–	0	–	0
Southern College		–		5	–	0	–	0
Middle Tennessee State Normal		–		4	–	0	–	0
Phillips		–		10	–	0	–	1
Navy		–		7	–	1	–	0
West Virginia		–		8	–	2	–	0
Mississippi Normal		–		4	–	1	–	2
Presbyterian		–		4	–	3	–	2
North Texas State Normal		–		5	–	3	–	0
Birmingham–Southern		–		4	–	3	–	0
Abilene Christian		–		2	–	2	–	0
Southwest Texas State		–		4	–	4	–	0
Spring Hill		–		3	–	3	–	1
Stetson		–		4	–	4	–	0
West Tennessee State Normal		–		3	–	4	–	0
Chattanooga		–		3	–	5	–	1
Marion		–		3	–	6	–	0
Texas Mines		–		2	–	4	–	0
Delaware		–		2	–	5	–	1
Oglethorpe		–		2	–	6	–	1
Wake Forest		–		2	–	6	–	0
Sam Houston Normal		–		0	–	7	–	0

The 1919 Southern College Blue and White football team represented Florida Southern College as an independent during the 1919 college football season. Southern upset Florida, 7–0.

== Schedule ==
Date	Time	Opponent	Site	Result	Source
October 11	4:30 p.m.	Carlstrom Field	Sutherland, FL	W 13–0	
October 24		at Carlstrom Field	Arcadia, FL	W 10–0	
November 1	3:30 p.m.	vs. Florida	McAdoo Field; St. Petersburg, FL	W 7–0	
November 8	3:00 p.m.	vs. Stetson	Plant Field; Tampa, FL	W 19–0	
November 27		Stetson		W 26–13	
All times are in Eastern time
