= 1919 Delaware Fightin' Blue Hens football team =

American college football season

1919 Delaware Fightin' Blue Hens football
- Conference: Independent
- Record: 2–5–1
- Head coach: Burton Shipley (1st season)
- Captain: Robert Stewart
- Home stadium: Frazer Field

1919 Southern college football independents records
	Conf.			Overall
Team	W	L	T	W		L		T
Marshall		–		8	–	0	–	0
Southern College		–		5	–	0	–	0
Middle Tennessee State Normal		–		4	–	0	–	0
Phillips		–		10	–	0	–	1
Navy		–		7	–	1	–	0
West Virginia		–		8	–	2	–	0
Mississippi Normal		–		4	–	1	–	2
Presbyterian		–		4	–	3	–	2
North Texas State Normal		–		5	–	3	–	0
Birmingham–Southern		–		4	–	3	–	0
Abilene Christian		–		2	–	2	–	0
Southwest Texas State		–		4	–	4	–	0
Spring Hill		–		3	–	3	–	1
Stetson		–		4	–	4	–	0
West Tennessee State Normal		–		3	–	4	–	0
Chattanooga		–		3	–	5	–	1
Marion		–		3	–	6	–	0
Texas Mines		–		2	–	4	–	0
Delaware		–		2	–	5	–	1
Oglethorpe		–		2	–	6	–	1
Wake Forest		–		2	–	6	–	0
Sam Houston Normal		–		0	–	7	–	0

The 1919 Delaware Fightin' Blue Hens football team was an American football team that represented Delaware College (later renamed the University of Delaware) as an independent during the 1919 college football season. In its first season under head coach Burton Shipley, the team compiled a 2–5–1 record and was outscored by a total of 197 to 42. Robert Stewart was the team captain. The team played its home games at Frazer Field in Newark, Delaware.

== Schedule ==
Date	Opponent	Site	Result	Attendance	Source
October 4	Franklin & Marshall	Frazer Field; Newark, DE	T 0–0		
October 11	at Penn	Franklin Field; Philadelphia, PA	L 0–89		
October 18	at Dickinson	Frazer Field; Newark, DE	L 0–20		
October 25	at Haverford	Haverford, PA	W 14–0		
November 1	at Georgetown	Washington, DC	L 7–47		
November 8	Swarthmore	Frazer Field; Newark, DE	L 0–17		
November 15	Lebanon Valley	Frazer Field; Newark, DE	W 21–7		
November 27	at Pennsylvania Military	Chester, PA	L 0–17		
