= 1919 Marshall Thundering Herd football team =

American college football season

1919 Marshall Thundering Herd football
- Conference: Independent
- Record: 8–0
- Head coach: Arch Reilly (1st season)
- Captain: Hugh Davisson
- Home stadium: Central Field

1919 Southern college football independents records
	Conf.			Overall
Team	W	L	T	W		L		T
Marshall		–		8	–	0	–	0
Southern College		–		5	–	0	–	0
Middle Tennessee State Normal		–		4	–	0	–	0
Phillips		–		10	–	0	–	1
Navy		–		7	–	1	–	0
West Virginia		–		8	–	2	–	0
Mississippi Normal		–		4	–	1	–	2
Presbyterian		–		4	–	3	–	2
North Texas State Normal		–		5	–	3	–	0
Birmingham–Southern		–		4	–	3	–	0
Abilene Christian		–		2	–	2	–	0
Southwest Texas State		–		4	–	4	–	0
Spring Hill		–		3	–	3	–	1
Stetson		–		4	–	4	–	0
West Tennessee State Normal		–		3	–	4	–	0
Chattanooga		–		3	–	5	–	1
Marion		–		3	–	6	–	0
Texas Mines		–		2	–	4	–	0
Delaware		–		2	–	5	–	1
Oglethorpe		–		2	–	6	–	1
Wake Forest		–		2	–	6	–	0
Sam Houston Normal		–		0	–	7	–	0

The 1919 Marshall Thundering Herd football team represented Marshall University as an independent during the 1919 college football season. In the first season resuming football after not fielding a team in 1918 due to World War I, Marshall posted an undefeated 8–0 record, outscoring its opposition 302–13. Home games were played on a campus field called "Central Field" which is presently Campus Commons.

== Schedule ==
Date	Opponent	Site	Result
October 4	Morris Harvey	Central Field; Huntington, WV	W 76–0
October 11	at Broaddus	Alderson, WV	W 27–0
October 18	Greenbrier Military Academy	Central Field; Huntington, WV	W 65–0
October 25	at Davis & Elkins	Elkins, WV	W 33–0
November 7	at Transylvania	Thomas Field; Lexington, KY	W 20–0
November 15	at Greenbrier Military Academy	Lewisburg, WV	W 29–7
November 22	Muskingum	Central Field; Huntington, WV	W 19–6
November 27	Kentucky Wesleyan^{†}	Central Field; Huntington, WV	W 33–0
^{†}Homecoming
