= 1919 Oglethorpe Stormy Petrels football team =

American college football season

1919 Oglethorpe Stormy Petrels football
- Conference: Independent
- Record: 2–6–1
- Head coach: Frank B. Anderson (3rd season)
- Captain: Cecil Lemon

1919 Southern college football independents records
	Conf.			Overall
Team	W	L	T	W		L		T
Marshall		–		8	–	0	–	0
Southern College		–		5	–	0	–	0
Middle Tennessee State Normal		–		4	–	0	–	0
Phillips		–		10	–	0	–	1
Navy		–		7	–	1	–	0
West Virginia		–		8	–	2	–	0
Mississippi Normal		–		4	–	1	–	2
Presbyterian		–		4	–	3	–	2
North Texas State Normal		–		5	–	3	–	0
Birmingham–Southern		–		4	–	3	–	0
Abilene Christian		–		2	–	2	–	0
Southwest Texas State		–		4	–	4	–	0
Spring Hill		–		3	–	3	–	1
Stetson		–		4	–	4	–	0
West Tennessee State Normal		–		3	–	4	–	0
Chattanooga		–		3	–	5	–	1
Marion		–		3	–	6	–	0
Texas Mines		–		2	–	4	–	0
Delaware		–		2	–	5	–	1
Oglethorpe		–		2	–	6	–	1
Wake Forest		–		2	–	6	–	0
Sam Houston Normal		–		0	–	7	–	0

The 1919 Oglethorpe Stormy Petrels football team represented Oglethorpe University in the sport of American football during the 1919 college football season.

== Game summaries ==
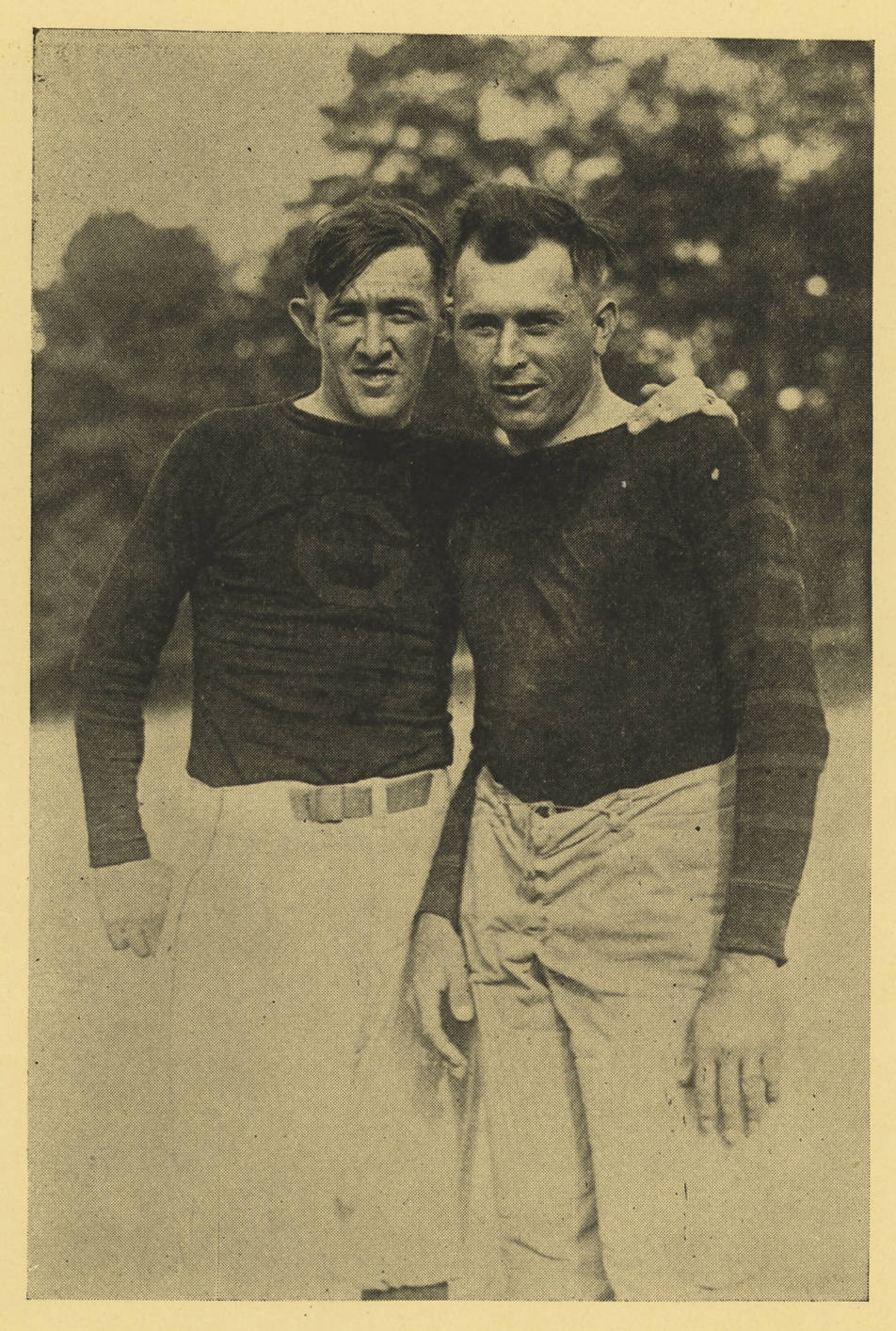
Coaches Anderson and Malone in 1919.

Games were won and lost by a nose with the forward pass being a constant struggle for the Stormy Petrels. The season, despite heavy losses, put Oglethorpe on the map through their athletic prowess and gentlemanly conduct, which set Oglethorpe up for membership in the Southern Intercollegiate Athletic Association (SIAA) after the following year, and the difficult schedule also prepared them for their tough opponents in years to come. The season was especially tough due to the lack of home games. The closest game Oglethorpe played to home was at Mercer University. Throughout the season the team traveled over 3,000 miles, and played in Tennessee, Georgia, South Carolina, and Florida. Everett Strupper was the team's backfield coach.

== Personnel ==
The season marked the third with Frank B. Anderson, who hired Kirby Malone as an assistant for the year. Cecil Lemon was the team captain.

== Schedule ==
Date	Time	Opponent	Site	Result	Source
September 26		at 5th Division–Camp Gordon	Sage Field; Camp Gordon, GA	L 0–26	
October 4	4:00 p.m.	at Furman	Manly Field; Greenville, SC	L 0–13	
October 11		at Chattanooga	Chamberlain Field; Chattanooga, TN	W 21–0	
October 25		Mercer	Grant Field; Atlanta, GA	W 73–0	
November 1		at Maryville (TN)	Maryville, TN	L 7–14	
November 8		at Sewanee	Hardee Field; Sewanee, TN	L 0–21	
November 15		at Cotton City A.C.	Savannah, GA	L 0–12	
November 18		at The Citadel	College Park Stadium; Charleston, SC	T 0–0	
November 27		at Florida	Fleming Field; Gainesville, FL	L 7–14	
All times are in Eastern time
