= 1919 Southwest Texas State football team =

American college football season

1919 Southwest Texas State football
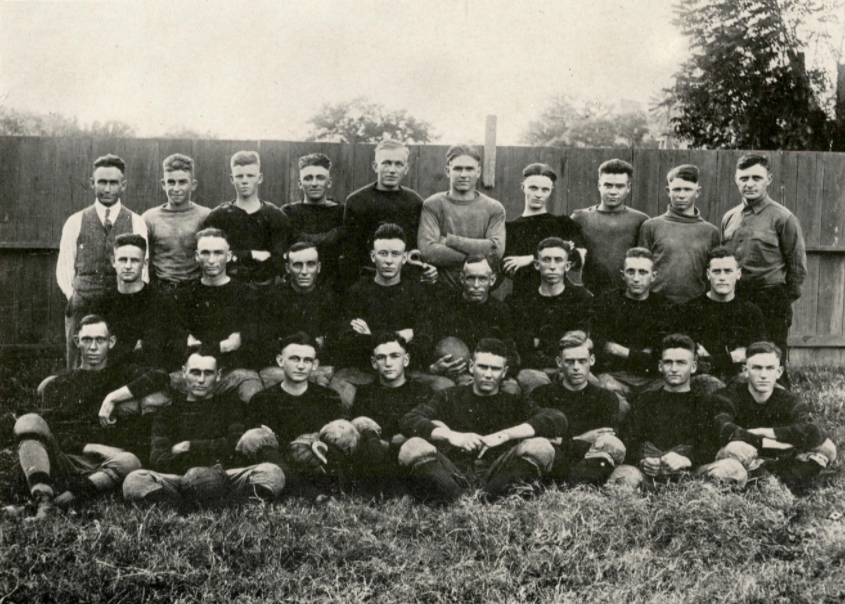
- Conference: Independent
- Record: 4–4
- Head coach: Oscar W. Strahan (1st season)
- Captain: Bob Shelton

1919 Southern college football independents records
	Conf.			Overall
Team	W	L	T	W		L		T
Marshall		–		8	–	0	–	0
Southern College		–		5	–	0	–	0
Middle Tennessee State Normal		–		4	–	0	–	0
Phillips		–		10	–	0	–	1
Navy		–		7	–	1	–	0
West Virginia		–		8	–	2	–	0
Mississippi Normal		–		4	–	1	–	2
Presbyterian		–		4	–	3	–	2
North Texas State Normal		–		5	–	3	–	0
Birmingham–Southern		–		4	–	3	–	0
Abilene Christian		–		2	–	2	–	0
Southwest Texas State		–		4	–	4	–	0
Spring Hill		–		3	–	3	–	1
Stetson		–		4	–	4	–	0
West Tennessee State Normal		–		3	–	4	–	0
Chattanooga		–		3	–	5	–	1
Marion		–		3	–	6	–	0
Texas Mines		–		2	–	4	–	0
Delaware		–		2	–	5	–	1
Oglethorpe		–		2	–	6	–	1
Wake Forest		–		2	–	6	–	0
Sam Houston Normal		–		0	–	7	–	0

The 1919 Southwest Texas State football team was an American football team that represented Southwest Texas State Normal School—now known as Texas State University–as an independent during the 1919 college football season. Better known for his basketball influences, Oscar W. Strahan became the university's first athletic director, and led the team to a 4–4 record in 1919. In a career spanning three decades, Strahan's teams posted a 72–52–10 record. This season also marked a departure from "academie football" as they entered the "college class." The team's captain was Bob Shelton, who played quarterback.

== Schedule ==
Date	Opponent	Site	Result	Source
October 3	at Texas A&M	Kyle Field; College Station, TX	L 0–28	
October 11	at Southwestern (TX)	Georgetown, TX	L 0–19	
October 17	Texas JV	Evans Field; San Marcos, TX	L 0–18	
October 24	Sam Houston Normal	Evans Field; San Marcos, TX (rivalry)	W 32–0	
October 31	Meridian	Evans Field; San Marcos, TX	L 0–7	
November 7	West Texas Military Academy		W 20–6	
November 17	at Sam Houston Normal	Pritchett Field; Huntsville, TX	W 7–0	
November 28	San Marcos Baptist Academy	Evans Field; San Marcos, TX	W 13–6	
