= Vernon McCasland =

American religious scholar

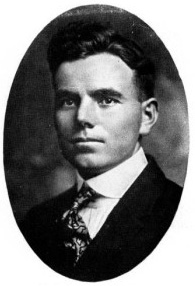
- McCasland pictured in The Prickly Pear 1920, Abilene Christian yearbook

Biographical details
- Born: September 27, 1896; Comanche, Texas, U.S.
- Died: November 15, 1970 (aged 74); Charlottesville, Virginia, U.S.

Coaching career (HC unless noted)

Football
- 1919: Abilene Christian

Basketball
- 1919–1920: Abilene Christian

Head coaching record
- Overall: 2–2 (football)

Selby Vernon McCasland (September 27, 1896 – November 15, 1970) was an American scholar of religion and was president of the American Academy of Religion in 1949. Earlier in life, he was a coach of American football and basketball at Abilene Christian University.

== Religion scholar ==
McCasland was the author of many books on religion.

== Coaching career ==
McCasland was the first head football coach at Abilene Christian University in Abilene, Texas and he held that position for the 1919 season. His coaching record at Abilene Christian 2–2.

== Head coaching record ==
=== Football ===
Year	Team	Overall	Conference	Standing	Bowl/playoffs
Abilene Christian (Independent) (1919)
1919	Abilene Christian	2–2			
Abilene Christian:		2–2			
Total:		2–2			
