= 1919 Michigan State Normal Normalites football team =

American college football season

1919 Michigan State Normal Normalites football
- Conference: Independent
- Head coach: Elton Rynearson (2nd season)
- Captain: Clifford D. Crane

1919 Midwestern college football independents records
	Conf.			Overall
Team	W	L	T	W		L		T
Notre Dame		–		9	–	0	–	0
Lincoln (MO)		–		3	–	0	–	0
Detroit		–		8	–	1	–	0
Western State Normal		–		4	–	1	–	0
Akron		–		6	–	1	–	1
North Dakota Agricultural		–		5	–	1	–	1
Haskell		–		8	–	2	–	1
Marquette		–		5	–	1	–	2
St. Xavier		–		6	–	2	–	0
Morningside		–		6	–	2	–	0
Heidelberg		–		6	–	3	–	0
Saint Louis		–		4	–	2	–	2
Valparaiso		–		5	–	3	–	0
Wabash		–		4	–	3	–	2
Central Michigan		–		2	–	2	–	3
Michigan Agricultural		–		4	–	4	–	1
Nebraska		–		3	–	3	–	2
St. Mary's (OH)		–		2	–	2	–	0
Iowa State Teachers		–		2	–	4	–	1
Toledo		–		2	–	4	–	0
Butler		–		0	–	5	–	1
Bowling Green		–		0	–	3	–	0

The 1919 Michigan State Normal Normalites football team was an American football team that represented Michigan State Normal College (later renamed Eastern Michigan University) as an independent during the 1919 college football season. In their second non-consecutive season under head coach Elton Rynearson, the Normalites compiled a 4–2–1 record and outscored opponents by a total of 73 to 44. Clifford D. Crane was the team captain.

== Schedule ==
Date	Opponent	Site	Result	Source
October 16	Assumption (ON)	Ypsilanti, MI	W 12–0	
October 23	at Bowling Green	Ridge Street grounds; Bowling Green, OH	W 10–0	
October 25	Adrian	Ypsilanti, MI	W 23–6	
November 1	Alma	Ypsilanti, MI	W 14–0	
November 7	at Central Michigan	Mount Pleasant, MI (rivalry)	T 7–7	
November 15	Albion	Ypsilanti, MI	L 7–30	
November 22	at Hillsdale	Hillsdale, MI	L 0–1	
