= 1919 Central Michigan Normalites football team =

American college football season

1919 Central Michigan Normalites football
- Conference: Independent
- Record: 2–2–3
- Head coach: Garland Nevitt (1st season)
- Home stadium: Alumni Field

1919 Midwestern college football independents records
	Conf.			Overall
Team	W	L	T	W		L		T
Notre Dame		–		9	–	0	–	0
Lincoln (MO)		–		3	–	0	–	0
Detroit		–		8	–	1	–	0
Western State Normal		–		4	–	1	–	0
Akron		–		6	–	1	–	1
North Dakota Agricultural		–		5	–	1	–	1
Haskell		–		8	–	2	–	1
Marquette		–		5	–	1	–	2
St. Xavier		–		6	–	2	–	0
Morningside		–		6	–	2	–	0
Heidelberg		–		6	–	3	–	0
Saint Louis		–		4	–	2	–	2
Valparaiso		–		5	–	3	–	0
Wabash		–		4	–	3	–	2
Central Michigan		–		2	–	2	–	3
Michigan Agricultural		–		4	–	4	–	1
Nebraska		–		3	–	3	–	2
St. Mary's (OH)		–		2	–	2	–	0
Iowa State Teachers		–		2	–	4	–	1
Toledo		–		2	–	4	–	0
Butler		–		0	–	5	–	1
Bowling Green		–		0	–	3	–	0

The 1919 Central Michigan Normalites football team represented Central Michigan Normal School (later renamed Central Michigan University) as an independent during the 1919 college football season. The Central Michigan football team compiled a 2–2–3 record and was outscored by its opponents by a combined total of 89 to 88. The team's victories were against Ferris Institute (7–0) and Bay City Western High School (33–6), he losses were against the Michigan Agricultural freshmen (13–0) and Detroit Junior College (42–13), and the ties were with Saginaw High School (13–13), Grand Rapids (7–7), and Michigan State Normal (7–7).

Garland Nevitt was hired as the school's head football coach in March 1919. He was an alumnus of Carlisle Indian Industrial School where he played with Jim Thorpe; he had been the football coach at the Mount Pleasant Indian School for three years before being hired by Central Normal.

== Schedule ==
Date	Opponent	Site	Result	Source
October 4	Bay City Western High School	Mount Pleasant, MI	W 33–6	
October 11	Ferris Institute		W 7–0	
October 18	Saginaw High School	Alumni Field; Mount Pleasant, MI	T 13–13	
October 24	Grand Rapids	Mount Pleasant, MI	T 7–7	
November 1	at Michigan Agricultural freshman	College Field; East Lansing, MI	L 0–13	
November 7	Michigan State Normal	Mount Pleasant, MI (rivalry)	T 7–7	
November 14	at Detroit Junior College	Goldberg Field; Detroit, MI	L 14–42	
