= List of Ohio Bobcats men's basketball head coaches =

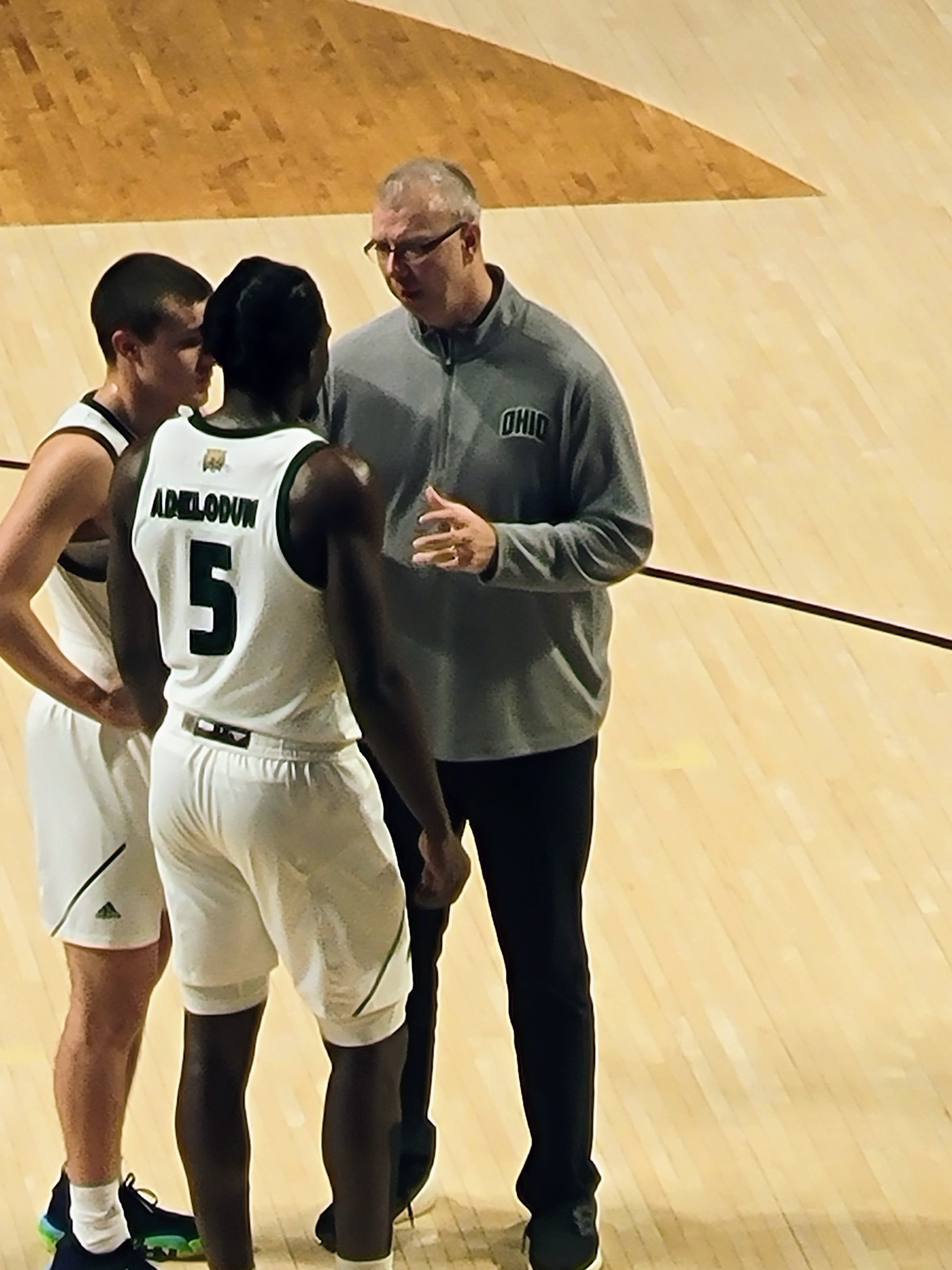
Jeff Boals, the current head coach of the Ohio Bobcats.

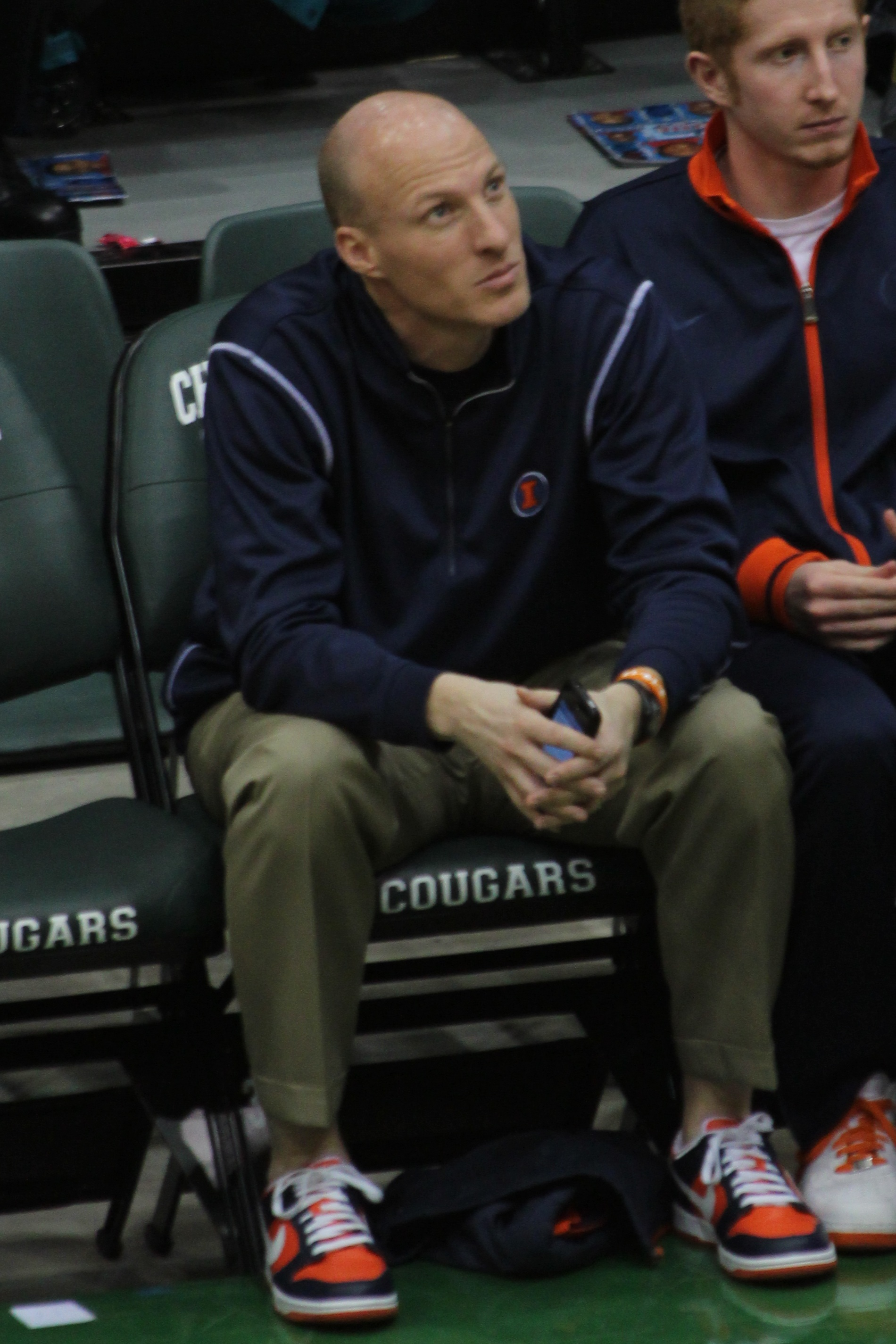
John Groce won three NCAA tournament games during his four-year tenure at Ohio.

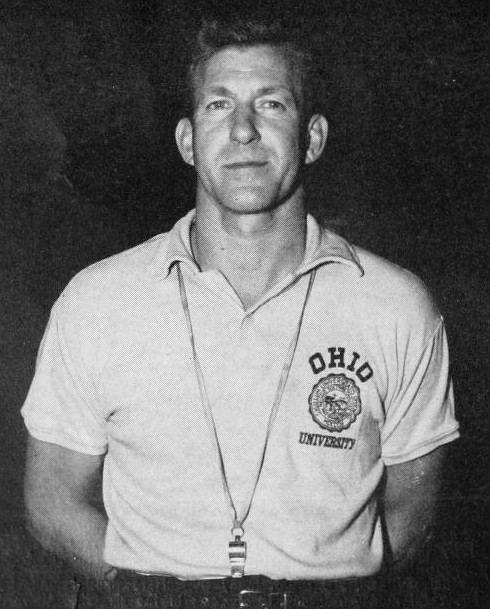
Jim Snyder, the winningest head coach in Bobcats men's basketball history.

The following is a list of Ohio Bobcats men's basketball head coaches. There have been 19 head coaches of the Bobcats in their 116-season history.

Ohio's current head coach is Jeff Boals. He was hired as the Bobcats' head coach in March 2019, replacing Saul Phillips, who was fired after the 2018–19 season.

No.	Tenure	Coach	Years	Record	Pct.
1	1907–1910	James C. Jones	3	10–10	.500
2	1910–1911	John Corbett	1	3–4	.429
3	1911–1912	Arthur W. Hinaman	1	2–9	.182
4	1912–1913	C. M. Douthit	1	5–8	.385
5	1913–1918	M. B. Banks	5	28–43	.394
6	1918–1920	Frank Gullum	2	10–10	.500
7	1920–1922	Russ Finsterwald	2	34–6	.850
8	1922–1938	Butch Grover	16	192–129	.598
9	1938–1949	Dutch Trautwein	11	136–90	.602
10	1949–1974	Jim Snyder	25	355–245	.592
11	1974–1980	Dale Bandy	6	69–89	.437
12	1980–1986	Danny Nee	6	107–67	.615
13	1986–1989	Billy Hahn	3	42–45	.483
14	1989–2001	Larry Hunter	12	204–148	.580
15	2001–2008	Tim O'Shea	7	120–95	.558
16	2008–2012	John Groce	4	85–56	.603
17	2012–2014	Jim Christian	2	49–21	.700
18	2014–2019	Saul Phillips	5	81–77	.513
19	2019–present	Jeff Boals	6	132–94	.584
Totals		19 coaches	118 seasons	1,666–1,247	.572
Records updated through end of 2025–26 season Source

Through 11/18/2026
