= 1919 Bowling Green Normals football team =

American college football season

1919 Bowling Green Normals football
- Conference: Independent
- Record: 0–3
- Head coach: John Stitt (1st season)
- Captain: Dale Treece
- Home stadium: Ridge Street grounds

1919 Midwestern college football independents records
| | Conf. | | | Overall |
| Team | W | L | T | W | | L | | T |
|---|---|---|---|---|---|---|---|---|
| Notre Dame | | – | | 9 | – | 0 | – | 0 |
| Lincoln (MO) | | – | | 3 | – | 0 | – | 0 |
| Detroit | | – | | 8 | – | 1 | – | 0 |
| Western State Normal | | – | | 4 | – | 1 | – | 0 |
| Akron | | – | | 6 | – | 1 | – | 1 |
| North Dakota Agricultural | | – | | 5 | – | 1 | – | 1 |
| Haskell | | – | | 8 | – | 2 | – | 1 |
| Marquette | | – | | 5 | – | 1 | – | 2 |
| St. Xavier | | – | | 6 | – | 2 | – | 0 |
| Morningside | | – | | 6 | – | 2 | – | 0 |
| Heidelberg | | – | | 6 | – | 3 | – | 0 |
| Saint Louis | | – | | 4 | – | 2 | – | 2 |
| Valparaiso | | – | | 5 | – | 3 | – | 0 |
| Wabash | | – | | 4 | – | 3 | – | 2 |
| Central Michigan | | – | | 2 | – | 2 | – | 3 |
| Michigan Agricultural | | – | | 4 | – | 4 | – | 1 |
| Nebraska | | – | | 3 | – | 3 | – | 2 |
| St. Mary's (OH) | | – | | 2 | – | 2 | – | 0 |
| Iowa State Teachers | | – | | 2 | – | 4 | – | 1 |
| Toledo | | – | | 2 | – | 4 | – | 0 |
| Butler | | – | | 0 | – | 5 | – | 1 |
| Bowling Green | | – | | 0 | – | 3 | – | 0 |

The 1919 Bowling Green Normals football team was an American football team that represented Bowling Green State Normal School (later Bowling Green State University) during the 1919 college football season. In its first season of intercollegiate football, Bowling Green compiled a 0–3 record and was outscored by a total of 28 to 0. Dale Treece was the team captain.

Bowling Green was founded in 1914, and the fall of 1919 marked the start of an aggressive athletic program led by Professor Beyerman. In September 1919, Raymond Ladd offered his services to lead the program until a coach could be secured. The school had less than 30 men enrolled in the student body for the fall of 1919, and every man who was physically able tried out for the team. The first intercollegiate football game was scheduled for October 3 against Toledo. John Stitt, who had been quarterback at the Case School of Applied Science in 1917, was brought in to coach the team in late September.

The team played its home games at the Ridge Street Athletic Field in Bowling Green, Ohio.

== Schedule ==
| Date | Opponent | Site | Result | Attendance | Source |
|---|---|---|---|---|---|
| October 3 | Toledo | Ridge Street grounds; Bowing Green, OH (rivalry) | L 0–6 | 400 | |
| October 18 | at Defiance | Defiance, OH | L 0–12 | | |
| October 22 | Michigan State Normal | Ridge Street grounds; Bowling Green, OH | L 0–10 | | |
