= 1919 Detroit Titans football team =

American college football season

1919 Detroit Titans football
- Conference: Independent
- Record: 8–1
- Head coach: James F. Duffy (2nd season)
- Home stadium: Navin Field

1919 Midwestern college football independents records
	Conf.			Overall
Team	W	L	T	W		L		T
Notre Dame		–		9	–	0	–	0
Lincoln (MO)		–		3	–	0	–	0
Detroit		–		8	–	1	–	0
Western State Normal		–		4	–	1	–	0
Akron		–		6	–	1	–	1
North Dakota Agricultural		–		5	–	1	–	1
Haskell		–		8	–	2	–	1
Marquette		–		5	–	1	–	2
St. Xavier		–		6	–	2	–	0
Morningside		–		6	–	2	–	0
Heidelberg		–		6	–	3	–	0
Saint Louis		–		4	–	2	–	2
Valparaiso		–		5	–	3	–	0
Wabash		–		4	–	3	–	2
Central Michigan		–		2	–	2	–	3
Michigan Agricultural		–		4	–	4	–	1
Nebraska		–		3	–	3	–	2
St. Mary's (OH)		–		2	–	2	–	0
Iowa State Teachers		–		2	–	4	–	1
Toledo		–		2	–	4	–	0
Butler		–		0	–	5	–	1
Bowling Green		–		0	–	3	–	0

The 1919 Detroit Titans football team was an American football team that represented the University of Detroit as an independent during the 1919 college football season. Detroit shut out five of its nine opponents, outscored all opponents by a combined total of 257 to 30, and finished with an 8–1 record.

James F. Duffy, who had led the team to an 8–1 record in 1917, rejoined the team as head coach after having served in the United States Navy during World War I. James M. "Bingo" Brown was the assistant football coach and also served as head coach of the basketball, track, and baseball teams. William A. Reid, formerly of Colgate, was the athletic director.

In an effort to place the Titans "on the national college football map", the school scheduled three games for 1919 against "three important teams from the east"—Georgetown, Tufts, and Holy Cross. The Titans won two of those three games.

Several players from the 1919 University of Detroit football team later played in National Football League, including end Walt Clago, halfbacks Eddie Moegle and Tip O'Neill, and tackle Tillie Voss.

The team conducted its pre-season practice sessions at the athletic field on Belle Isle. An alumni committee then arranged for further practice sessions and the team's home games to be played at Navin Field, which was also the home field for the Detroit Tigers baseball team.

== Schedule ==
Date	Opponent	Site	Result	Attendance	Source
October 4	Hillsdale	Navin Field; Detroit, MI	W 34–0		
October 11	Ohio Northern	Navin Field; Detroit, MI	W 35–3		
October 18	Bethany (WV)	Navin Field; Detroit, MI	W 47–0		
October 25	Georgetown	Navin Field; Detroit, MI	W 16–13		
November 1	Kalamazoo	Navin Field; Detroit, MI	W 28–0		
November 8	Tufts	Navin Field; Detroit, MI	L 3–7	10,000	
November 15	North Dakota Agricultural	Navin Field; Detroit, MI	W 48–0		
November 22	at Buffalo	International Park; Buffalo, NY	W 25–0		
November 27	Holy Cross	Navin Field; Detroit, MI	W 21–7		

== Roster ==
The players on the Titans' 1919 football team included the following:

- Francis Bowler, 5'8", 165 pounds - halfback
- Joe Brennan, 5'10", 156 pounds - quarterback
- Warren Brennan, 5'11", 172 pounds - end
- Walt Clago, 6', 181 pounds - end
- John Curtain, 5'9", 158 pounds - fullback
- Walter "Speed" Ellis, 5'11", 200 pounds - tackle
- F. Fitzgerald, 5'10", 185 pounds - halfback and captain
- Martin Gormley - 6', 210 pounds - guard
- Peter Hampston, 6', 165 pounds - quarterback
- Thomas Hogan, 6'2", 180 pounds - tackle
- Lauren A. Howe, 5'10", 160 pounds - halfback
- Frances Kane, 5'10", 155 pounds - end
- Thomas A. Kenney, 5'10", 170 pounds - center
- Edward Larkin 6', 180 pounds - tackle
- Harold S. "Dutch" Lauer, 5'10", 175 pounds - fullback
- Hansen Loving,5'8", 160 pounds - halfback
- Eddie Moegle, 5'9", 159 pounds - halfback
- Tip O'Neill, 5'10", 157 pounds - halfback
- Percy Prey, 6'1", 177 pounds - guard/tackle
- Claude Seitz, 5'10", 158 pounds - fullback
- Tillie Voss, 6'1", 190 pounds - guard/tackle
