= 1919 North Dakota Agricultural Aggies football team =

American college football season

1919 North Dakota Agricultural Aggies football
- Conference: Independent
- Record: 5–1–1
- Head coach: Stanley Borleske (1st season)
- Captain: Paul J. Peterson
- Home stadium: Dacotah Field

1919 Midwestern college football independents records
	Conf.			Overall
Team	W	L	T	W		L		T
Notre Dame		–		9	–	0	–	0
Lincoln (MO)		–		3	–	0	–	0
Detroit		–		8	–	1	–	0
Western State Normal		–		4	–	1	–	0
Akron		–		6	–	1	–	1
North Dakota Agricultural		–		5	–	1	–	1
Haskell		–		8	–	2	–	1
Marquette		–		5	–	1	–	2
St. Xavier		–		6	–	2	–	0
Morningside		–		6	–	2	–	0
Heidelberg		–		6	–	3	–	0
Saint Louis		–		4	–	2	–	2
Valparaiso		–		5	–	3	–	0
Wabash		–		4	–	3	–	2
Central Michigan		–		2	–	2	–	3
Michigan Agricultural		–		4	–	4	–	1
Nebraska		–		3	–	3	–	2
St. Mary's (OH)		–		2	–	2	–	0
Iowa State Teachers		–		2	–	4	–	1
Toledo		–		2	–	4	–	0
Butler		–		0	–	5	–	1
Bowling Green		–		0	–	3	–	0

The 1919 North Dakota Agricultural Aggies football team was an American football team that represented North Dakota Agricultural College (now known as North Dakota State University) as an independent during the 1919 college football season. In their first year under head coach Stanley Borleske, the team compiled a 5–1–1 record.

== Schedule ==
Date	Opponent	Site	Result	Source
October 4	Moorhead State	Dacotah Field; Fargo, ND	W 26–6	
October 11	at Jamestown	Jamestown, ND	W 7–0	
October 18	St. Thomas (MN)	Dacotah Field; Fargo, ND	W 6–0	
October 25	South Dakota State	Dacotah Field; Fargo, ND (rivalry)	T 0–0	
November 1	at North Dakota	Dakota Field; Grand Forks, ND (rivalry)	W 7–6	
November 8	Fargo	Dacotah Field; Fargo, ND	W 6–0	
November 15	at Detroit	Navin Field; Detroit, MI	L 0–48	
