= 1919 Nebraska Cornhuskers football team =

American college football season

1919 Nebraska Cornhuskers football
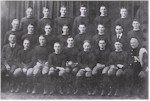
- Conference: Independent
- Record: 3–3–2
- Head coach: Henry Schulte (1st season)
- Home stadium: Nebraska Field

1919 Midwestern college football independents records
	Conf.			Overall
Team	W	L	T	W		L		T
Notre Dame		–		9	–	0	–	0
Lincoln (MO)		–		3	–	0	–	0
Detroit		–		8	–	1	–	0
Western State Normal		–		4	–	1	–	0
Akron		–		6	–	1	–	1
North Dakota Agricultural		–		5	–	1	–	1
Haskell		–		8	–	2	–	1
Marquette		–		5	–	1	–	2
St. Xavier		–		6	–	2	–	0
Morningside		–		6	–	2	–	0
Heidelberg		–		6	–	3	–	0
Saint Louis		–		4	–	2	–	2
Valparaiso		–		5	–	3	–	0
Wabash		–		4	–	3	–	2
Central Michigan		–		2	–	2	–	3
Michigan Agricultural		–		4	–	4	–	1
Nebraska		–		3	–	3	–	2
St. Mary's (OH)		–		2	–	2	–	0
Iowa State Teachers		–		2	–	4	–	1
Toledo		–		2	–	4	–	0
Butler		–		0	–	5	–	1
Bowling Green		–		0	–	3	–	0

The 1919 Nebraska Cornhuskers football team represented the University of Nebraska in the 1919 college football season. The team was coached by first-year head coach Henry Schulte and played its home games at Nebraska Field in Lincoln, Nebraska. The team competed as an independent, departing the Missouri Valley Conference after thirteen seasons. Schulte became the twelfth official head coach in the program's twenty-nine years of competition; his first team faced a daunting schedule consisting of Iowa, Notre Dame, Minnesota, and Syracuse as Nebraska's athletic department sought to schedule high-profile matchups.

== Schedule ==
Date	Time	Opponent	Site	Result	Attendance	Source
October 4	2:30 p.m.	at Iowa	Iowa Field; Iowa City, IA (rivalry)	L 0–18		
October 11	2:00 p.m.	at Minnesota	Northrop Field; Minneapolis, MN (rivalry)	T 6–6	10,000	
October 18	2:30 p.m.	Notre Dame	Nebraska Field; Lincoln, NE (rivalry)	L 9–14		
October 25	3:30 p.m.	vs. Oklahoma	Rourke Park; Omaha, NE (rivalry)	T 7–7		
November 1	2:30 p.m.	Iowa State	Nebraska Field; Lincoln, NE (rivalry)	L 0–3		
November 8	2:30 p.m.	at Missouri	Rollins Field; Columbia, MO (rivalry)	W 12–5		
November 15	2:30 p.m.	Kansas^{†}	Nebraska Field; Lincoln, NE (rivalry)	W 19–7	8,000	
November 27	2:30 p.m.	Syracuse	Nebraska Field; Lincoln, NE	W 3–0	7,000	
^{†}Homecoming; All times are in Central time

== Coaching staff ==
Coach	Position	First year	Alma mater
Henry Schulte	Head coach	1919	Michigan
Paul J. Schissler	Assistant coach	1918	
Jack Best	Trainer	1890	Nebraska

== Roster ==
Dale, Fred FB
Dana, Herbert E
Day, William C
Dobson, Paul HB
Henry, Stanley HB
Howarth, Harry QB
Hubka, Ernest FB
Jobes, Raymond HB
Kellogg, Sam T
Lyman, Roy Link T
McGlasson, Harold QB
Munn, Monte G
Munn, Wade G
Newman, Richard QB
Pucelik, John G
Russell, Robert QB
Schellenberg, Elmer HB
Swanson, Clarence E
Wilder, Harold T
Wright, Floyd HB
Young, Farley G

== Game summaries ==
=== At Iowa ===
Nebraska at Iowa

Team	1	2	3	4	Total
Nebraska	0	0	0	0	0
• Iowa	13	3	0	2	18

- Date: October 4
- Location: Iowa City, IA
- Game start: 2:30 p.m.

=== At Minnesota ===
Nebraska at Minnesota

Team	1	2	Total
Nebraska			6
Minnesota			6

- Date: October 11
- Location: Northrop Field, Minneapolis, MN
- Game start: 2:00 p.m.
- Game attendance: 10,000

Two goal-line stands and a nine-yard touchdown rush gave Minnesota a 6–0 halftime lead. A long touchdown by backup Elmer Schellenberg tied the game at six at the end of the third quarter; NU missed the point after and the game ended in a tie.

=== Notre Dame ===
Notre Dame at Nebraska

Team	1	2	3	4	Total
• Notre Dame	7	0	7	0	14
Nebraska	0	6	0	3	9

- Date: October 18
- Location: Nebraska Field, Lincoln, NE
- Game start: 2:30 p.m.

A reverse pass on the first drive of the game gave Notre Dame an early lead. NU scored before halftime, but Notre Dame star George Gipp dominated in the second half and the Irish won 14–9. Nebraska lost three consecutive games for the first time since 1899.

=== Oklahoma ===
Oklahoma vs. Nebraska

Team	1	2	Total
Oklahoma			7
Nebraska			7

- Date: October 25
- Location: Omaha, NE
- Game start: 3:30 p.m.

=== Iowa State ===
Iowa State at Nebraska

Team	1	2	Total
• Iowa State			3
Nebraska			0

- Date: November 1
- Location: Nebraska Field, Lincoln, NE
- Game start: 2:30 p.m.

Nebraska failed to win for the fifth consecutive game, tying the program's longest such stretch.

=== At Missouri ===
Nebraska at Missouri

Team	1	2	Total
• Nebraska			12
Missouri			5

- Date: November 8
- Location: Rollins Field, Columbia, MO
- Game start: 2:30 p.m.

Despite missing five starters, Nebraska won its first game of the season in Columbia.

=== Kansas ===
Kansas at Nebraska

Team	1	2	Total
Kansas			7
• Nebraska			19

- Date: November 15
- Location: Nebraska Field, Lincoln, NE
- Game start: 2:30 p.m.

=== Syracuse ===
Syracuse at Nebraska

Team	1	2	Total
Syracuse			0
• Nebraska			3

- Date: November 27
- Location: Nebraska Field, Lincoln, NE
- Game start: 2:30 p.m.
- Game attendance: 7,000
- Game weather: Snow, 0 °F (−18 °C)

On a snowy Thanksgiving day, Nebraska defeated Syracuse 3–0 to close the season with its third straight win.
