= 1919 St. Xavier Saints football team =

American college football season

1919 St. Xavier Saints football
- Conference: Independent
- Record: 6–2
- Head coach: Albert B. Lambert (2nd season)

1919 Midwestern college football independents records
	Conf.			Overall
Team	W	L	T	W		L		T
Notre Dame		–		9	–	0	–	0
Lincoln (MO)		–		3	–	0	–	0
Detroit		–		8	–	1	–	0
Western State Normal		–		4	–	1	–	0
Akron		–		6	–	1	–	1
North Dakota Agricultural		–		5	–	1	–	1
Haskell		–		8	–	2	–	1
Marquette		–		5	–	1	–	2
St. Xavier		–		6	–	2	–	0
Morningside		–		6	–	2	–	0
Heidelberg		–		6	–	3	–	0
Saint Louis		–		4	–	2	–	2
Valparaiso		–		5	–	3	–	0
Wabash		–		4	–	3	–	2
Central Michigan		–		2	–	2	–	3
Michigan Agricultural		–		4	–	4	–	1
Nebraska		–		3	–	3	–	2
St. Mary's (OH)		–		2	–	2	–	0
Iowa State Teachers		–		2	–	4	–	1
Toledo		–		2	–	4	–	0
Butler		–		0	–	5	–	1
Bowling Green		–		0	–	3	–	0

The 1919 St. Xavier Musketeers football team was an American football team that represented St. Xavier College (later renamed Xavier University) as an independent during the 1919 college football season. In its second and final season under head coach Albert B. Lambert, the team compiled a 6–2 record and outscored opponents by a total of 260 to 73.

== Schedule ==
Date	Opponent	Site	Result	Source
September 27	at Wilmington (OH)	College Stadium; Wilmington, OH	W 13–0	
October 4	at Hanover	Hanover, IN	W 68–0	
October 11	at Kentucky Wesleyan	Winchester, KY	W 37–7	
October 18	at Centre	Cheek Field; Danville, KY	L 0–57	
October 26	Franklin (IN)	Norwood Ball Park; Norwood, OH	W 9–0	
November 8	Rose Polytechnic	Norwood Ball Park; Norwood, OH	W 6–2	
November 15	Fort Thomas (KY)	Norwood Ball Park; Norwood, OH	W 120–0	
November 27	Haskell	Norwood Ball Park; Norwood, OH	L 0–7	
