= 1919 Morningside Maroons football team =

American college football season

1919 Morningside Maroons football
- Conference: Independent
- Record: 5–2
- Head coach: Jason M. Saunderson (8th season)
- Captain: Wenig (right end)
- Home stadium: Bass Field

1919 Midwestern college football independents records
	Conf.			Overall
Team	W	L	T	W		L		T
Notre Dame		–		9	–	0	–	0
Lincoln (MO)		–		3	–	0	–	0
Detroit		–		8	–	1	–	0
Western State Normal		–		4	–	1	–	0
Akron		–		6	–	1	–	1
North Dakota Agricultural		–		5	–	1	–	1
Haskell		–		8	–	2	–	1
Marquette		–		5	–	1	–	2
St. Xavier		–		6	–	2	–	0
Morningside		–		6	–	2	–	0
Heidelberg		–		6	–	3	–	0
Saint Louis		–		4	–	2	–	2
Valparaiso		–		5	–	3	–	0
Wabash		–		4	–	3	–	2
Central Michigan		–		2	–	2	–	3
Michigan Agricultural		–		4	–	4	–	1
Nebraska		–		3	–	3	–	2
St. Mary's (OH)		–		2	–	2	–	0
Iowa State Teachers		–		2	–	4	–	1
Toledo		–		2	–	4	–	0
Butler		–		0	–	5	–	1
Bowling Green		–		0	–	3	–	0

The 1919 Morningside Maroons football team was an American football that represented Morningside College during the 1919 college football season. In its eighth season under head coach Jason M. Saunderson, the team compiled a 5–2 record.

== Schedule ==
Date	Opponent	Site	Result	Attendance	Source
October 10	at Nebraska Wesleyan	Johnson Field; Lincoln, NE	W 19–0		
October 17	Kearney State	Bass Field; Sioux City, IA	W 40–0		
October 24	at South Dakota	Vermillion, SD	L 3–13		
November 3	Iowa State Teachers	Bass Field; Sioux City, IA	W 41–2		
November 8	Simpson (IA)	Bass Field; Sioux City, IA	W 38–10		
November 15	Valparaiso	Bass Field; Sioux City, IA	W 27–0		
November 27	Notre Dame	Bass Field; Sioux City, IA	L 6–14	4,000–10,000	
