= 1919 Toledo Blue and Gold football team =

American college football season

1919 Toledo Blue and Gold football
- Conference: Independent
- Record: 2–4
- Head coach: Watt Hobt (1st season)

1919 Midwestern college football independents records
	Conf.			Overall
Team	W	L	T	W		L		T
Notre Dame		–		9	–	0	–	0
Lincoln (MO)		–		3	–	0	–	0
Detroit		–		8	–	1	–	0
Western State Normal		–		4	–	1	–	0
Akron		–		6	–	1	–	1
North Dakota Agricultural		–		5	–	1	–	1
Haskell		–		8	–	2	–	1
Marquette		–		5	–	1	–	2
St. Xavier		–		6	–	2	–	0
Morningside		–		6	–	2	–	0
Heidelberg		–		6	–	3	–	0
Saint Louis		–		4	–	2	–	2
Valparaiso		–		5	–	3	–	0
Wabash		–		4	–	3	–	2
Central Michigan		–		2	–	2	–	3
Michigan Agricultural		–		4	–	4	–	1
Nebraska		–		3	–	3	–	2
St. Mary's (OH)		–		2	–	2	–	0
Iowa State Teachers		–		2	–	4	–	1
Toledo		–		2	–	4	–	0
Butler		–		0	–	5	–	1
Bowling Green		–		0	–	3	–	0

The 1919 Toledo Blue and Gold football team was an American football team that represented Toledo University (renamed the University of Toledo in 1967) as an independent during the 1919 college football season. Led by first-year coach Watt Hobt, Toledo compiled a 2–4 record.

== Schedule ==
Date	Opponent	Site	Result	Attendance	Source
September 27	at Ohio Northern	Ada, OH	L 0-13		
October 3	at Bowling Green	Ridge Street grounds; Bowing Green, OH (rivalry)	W 6-0	400	
October 11	at Western Reserve	Cleveland, OH	L 0-19		
October 19	at Adrian	Adrian, MI	L 6-27		
October 25	at Defiance	Defiance, OH	W 12-6		
November 1	Detroit Junior College	Toledo, OH	L 7-8		
