= 1919 Marquette Hilltoppers football team =

American college football season

1919 Marquette Hilltoppers football
- Conference: Independent
- Record: 5–1–2
- Head coach: John J. Ryan (3rd season)

1919 Midwestern college football independents records
	Conf.			Overall
Team	W	L	T	W		L		T
Notre Dame		–		9	–	0	–	0
Lincoln (MO)		–		3	–	0	–	0
Detroit		–		8	–	1	–	0
Western State Normal		–		4	–	1	–	0
Akron		–		6	–	1	–	1
North Dakota Agricultural		–		5	–	1	–	1
Haskell		–		8	–	2	–	1
Marquette		–		5	–	1	–	2
St. Xavier		–		6	–	2	–	0
Morningside		–		6	–	2	–	0
Heidelberg		–		6	–	3	–	0
Saint Louis		–		4	–	2	–	2
Valparaiso		–		5	–	3	–	0
Wabash		–		4	–	3	–	2
Central Michigan		–		2	–	2	–	3
Michigan Agricultural		–		4	–	4	–	1
Nebraska		–		3	–	3	–	2
St. Mary's (OH)		–		2	–	2	–	0
Iowa State Teachers		–		2	–	4	–	1
Toledo		–		2	–	4	–	0
Butler		–		0	–	5	–	1
Bowling Green		–		0	–	3	–	0

The 1919 Marquette Hilltoppers football team was an American football team that represented Marquette University as an independent during the 1919 college football season. In its third season under head coach John J. Ryan, the team compiled a 5–1–2 record.

== Schedule ==
Date	Opponent	Site	Result	Attendance	Source
October 4	Carroll (WI)	Milwaukee, WI	W 20–0		
October 11	at Wisconsin	Camp Randall Stadium; Madison, WI	L 0–13	3,500	
October 18	Lawrence	Milwaukee, WI	W 53–0		
October 25	at Creighton	Rourke Park; Omaha, NE	T 0–0		
November 1	Great Lakes Navy	Milwaukee, WI	W 39–0		
November 8	at Saint Louis	Sportsman's Park; St. Louis, MO	T 0–0	4,000	
November 15	North Dakota	Milwaukee, WI	W 6–0		
November 22	Wabash	Milwaukee, WI	W 13–6		
