= Nevitt =

Nevitt is a given name and surname. Notable people with the name include:

- Nevitt Sanford (1909–1995), American psychology professor
- Chuck Nevitt (born 1959), American basketball player
- Garland Nevitt (1887–1970), American football, basketball and baseball coach
- Elliott Nevitt (born 1996), English footballer
- Thomas Nevitt (1864–1932), Australian politician

== See also ==
- Nevit, given name
- Nevett, surname
