= Tip O'Neill (disambiguation) =

Tip O'Neill (1912–1994) was an American politician.

Tip O'Neill may also refer to:

- Tip O'Neill (baseball) (1858–1915), Canadian baseball player
- Tip O'Neill (American football) (1898–1984), American football player in the National Football League

== See also ==
- Tip O'Neill Award, a baseball award named in honor of the baseball player
- O'Neill (surname)
