= 1919 Haskell Indians football team =

American college football season

1919 Haskell Indians football
- Conference: Independent
- Record: 8–2–1
- Head coach: Bud Saunders (2nd season)
- Home stadium: Haskell Field

1919 Midwestern college football independents records
	Conf.			Overall
Team	W	L	T	W		L		T
Notre Dame		–		9	–	0	–	0
Lincoln (MO)		–		3	–	0	–	0
Detroit		–		8	–	1	–	0
Western State Normal		–		4	–	1	–	0
Akron		–		6	–	1	–	1
North Dakota Agricultural		–		5	–	1	–	1
Haskell		–		8	–	2	–	1
Marquette		–		5	–	1	–	2
St. Xavier		–		6	–	2	–	0
Morningside		–		6	–	2	–	0
Heidelberg		–		6	–	3	–	0
Saint Louis		–		4	–	2	–	2
Valparaiso		–		5	–	3	–	0
Wabash		–		4	–	3	–	2
Central Michigan		–		2	–	2	–	3
Michigan Agricultural		–		4	–	4	–	1
Nebraska		–		3	–	3	–	2
St. Mary's (OH)		–		2	–	2	–	0
Iowa State Teachers		–		2	–	4	–	1
Toledo		–		2	–	4	–	0
Butler		–		0	–	5	–	1
Bowling Green		–		0	–	3	–	0

The 1919 Haskell Indians football team was an American football team that represented the Haskell Indian Institute (now known as Haskell Indian Nations University) as an independent during the 1919 college football season. In its first season under head coach Bud Saunders, Haskell compiled an 8–2–1 record, shut out five opponents, and outscored opponents by a total of 218 to 53.

== Schedule ==
Date	Opponent	Site	Result	Attendance	Source
September 20	Camp Funston	Haskell Field; Lawrence, KS	W 35–0		
September 27	Kansas University of Commerce of Salina	Haskell Field; Lawrence, KS	W 71–0		
October 4	Baker	Haskell Field; Lawrence, KS	W 9–0		
October 11	at Oklahoma A&M	Lewis Field; Stillwater, OK	W 12–3		
October 18	Wentworth Military Academy	Haskell Field; Lawrence, KS	W 37–0		
October 27	Kansas Wesleyan	Haskell Field; Lawrence, KS	W 20–7		
November 1	at Creighton	Omaha, NE	T 6–6		
November 8	at Kansas State	Ahearn Field; Manhattan, KS	W 7–3		
November 14	at Texas	Clark Field; Austin, TX	L 7–13		
November 18	at Phillips	Alton Field; Enid, OK	L 7–21	4,500	
November 27	at St. Xavier	Cincinnati, OH	W 7–0		
