= 1919 Western State Normal Hilltoppers football team =

American college football season

1919 Western State Normal Hilltoppers football
- Conference: Independent
- Record: 4–1
- Head coach: William H. Spaulding (13th season)
- Captain: Walt Olsen
- Home stadium: Normal field

1919 Midwestern college football independents records
	Conf.			Overall
Team	W	L	T	W		L		T
Notre Dame		–		9	–	0	–	0
Lincoln (MO)		–		3	–	0	–	0
Detroit		–		8	–	1	–	0
Western State Normal		–		4	–	1	–	0
Akron		–		6	–	1	–	1
North Dakota Agricultural		–		5	–	1	–	1
Haskell		–		8	–	2	–	1
Marquette		–		5	–	1	–	2
St. Xavier		–		6	–	2	–	0
Morningside		–		6	–	2	–	0
Heidelberg		–		6	–	3	–	0
Saint Louis		–		4	–	2	–	2
Valparaiso		–		5	–	3	–	0
Wabash		–		4	–	3	–	2
Central Michigan		–		2	–	2	–	3
Michigan Agricultural		–		4	–	4	–	1
Nebraska		–		3	–	3	–	2
St. Mary's (OH)		–		2	–	2	–	0
Iowa State Teachers		–		2	–	4	–	1
Toledo		–		2	–	4	–	0
Butler		–		0	–	5	–	1
Bowling Green		–		0	–	3	–	0

The 1919 Western State Normal Hilltoppers football team represented Western State Normal School (later renamed Western Michigan University) as an independent during the 1919 college football season. In their 13th season under head coach William H. Spaulding, the Hilltoppers compiled a 4–1 record and outscored their opponents, 156 to 91. Quarterback Walt Olsen was the team captain.

== Schedule ==
Date	Time	Opponent	Site	Result	Attendance	Source
October 4	2:30 p.m.	Detroit Junior College	Normal field; Kalamazoo, MI	W 88–0		
October 11		at Michigan Agricultural	College Field; East Lansing, MI	W 21–18		
October 18		Wabash	Normal field; Kalamazoo, MI	W 27–13		
October 25	2:30 p.m.	at Notre Dame	Cartier Field; Notre Dame, IN	L 0–53	2,500	
November 21		at Albion	Albion, MI	W 20–7		
All times are in Central time
