= 1919 Notre Dame Fighting Irish football team =

American college football season

1919 Notre Dame Fighting Irish football
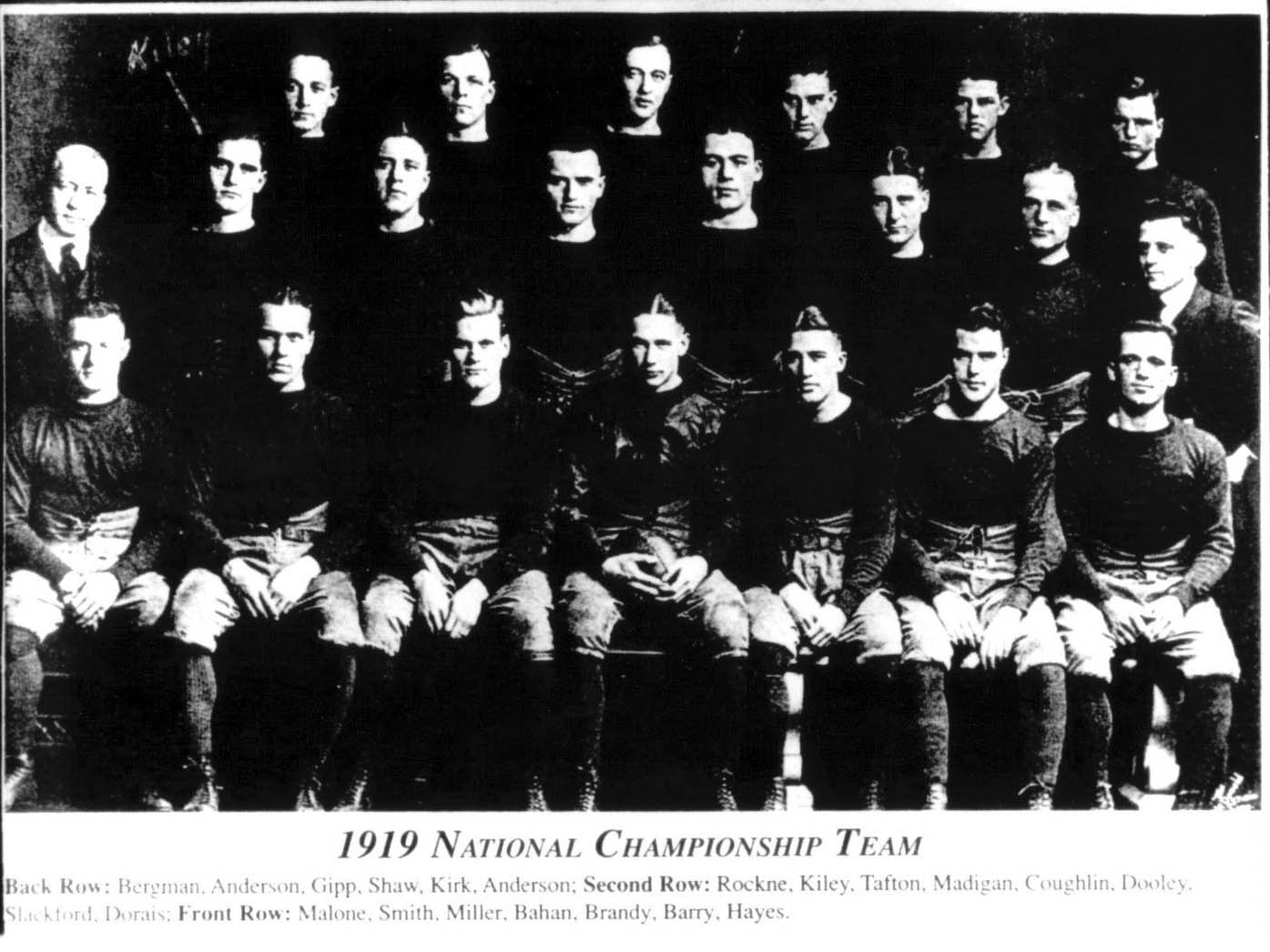

Co-national champion (NCF, Davis) Indiana state champion
- Conference: Independent
- Record: 9–0
- Head coach: Knute Rockne (2nd season)
- Offensive scheme: Single-wing
- Base defense: 7–2–2
- Captain: Leonard Bahan
- Home stadium: Cartier Field

Uniform
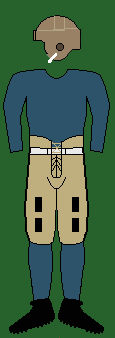

1919 Midwestern college football independents records
	Conf.			Overall
Team	W	L	T	W		L		T
Notre Dame		–		9	–	0	–	0
Lincoln (MO)		–		3	–	0	–	0
Detroit		–		8	–	1	–	0
Western State Normal		–		4	–	1	–	0
Akron		–		6	–	1	–	1
North Dakota Agricultural		–		5	–	1	–	1
Haskell		–		8	–	2	–	1
Marquette		–		5	–	1	–	2
St. Xavier		–		6	–	2	–	0
Morningside		–		6	–	2	–	0
Heidelberg		–		6	–	3	–	0
Saint Louis		–		4	–	2	–	2
Valparaiso		–		5	–	3	–	0
Wabash		–		4	–	3	–	2
Central Michigan		–		2	–	2	–	3
Michigan Agricultural		–		4	–	4	–	1
Nebraska		–		3	–	3	–	2
St. Mary's (OH)		–		2	–	2	–	0
Iowa State Teachers		–		2	–	4	–	1
Toledo		–		2	–	4	–	0
Butler		–		0	–	5	–	1
Bowling Green		–		0	–	3	–	0

The 1919 Notre Dame Fighting Irish football team was an American football team that represented the University of Notre Dame as an independent during the 1919 college football season. In their second season under head coach Knute Rockne, the Irish compiled a perfect 9–0 record and outscored opponents by a total of 229 to 47. Gus Dorais was the assistant coach.

There was no contemporaneous system in 1919 for determining a national champion. However, Notre Dame was retroactively named as the co-national champion for 1919 by the National Championship Foundation and Parke H. Davis. Other selectors chose Harvard, Illinois, and/or Texas A&M as the 1919 national champion or co-champion.

Five persons affiliated with the 1919 Notre Dame team were inducted into the College Football Hall of Fame: Rockne (inducted 1951); halfback George Gipp (inducted 1951); Dorais (inducted 1954); end Eddie Anderson (inducted 1971); and guard Hunk Anderson (inducted 1974). In addition, tackle George Trafton was inducted in 1964 into the Pro Football Hall of Fame. Quarterback Leonard Bahan was the team captain. Other notable players from the 1919 Notre Dame team included Bernard Kirk, Cy DeGree, and John Mohardt.

The team played its home games at Cartier Field in Notre Dame, Indiana.

== Schedule ==
Date	Time	Opponent	Site	Result	Attendance	Source
October 4		Kalamazoo	Cartier Field; Notre Dame, IN	W 14–0	5,000	
October 11		Mount Union	Cartier Field; Notre Dame, IN	W 60–7	4,000	
October 18		at Nebraska	Nebraska Field; Lincoln, NE (rivalry)	W 14–9	10,000	
October 25	2:30 p.m.	Western State Normal	Cartier Field; Notre Dame, IN	W 53–0	2,500	
November 1		vs. Indiana	Washington Park; Indianapolis, IN	W 16–3	5,000	
November 8		at Army	The Plain; West Point, NY (rivalry)	W 12–9	8,000	
November 15		Michigan Agricultural	Cartier Field; Notre Dame, IN (rivalry)	W 13–0	5,000	
November 22		at Purdue	Stuart Field; West Lafayette, IN (rivalry)	W 33–13	7,000	
November 27		at Morningside	Bass Field; Sioux City, IA	W 14–6	10,000	
All times are in Central time

== Game summaries ==
=== Kalamazoo ===
Notre Dame's "Football Review 1919" (Football Review) described the season opener as follows: "On October 4th our men met Kalamazoo College on Cartier Field. Our line was not yet in perfect shape, and Kalamazoo furnished rather unexpected opposition. However, as the game progressed, several sensational plays in which Bahan, Malone and Gipp starred, resulted in two touchdowns. Bergman figured in a fifty-yard run through the entire line. The final score was 14 to 0."

Walter Eckersall in Chicago Tribune: "Although the hot weather may have been partly responsible for Notre Dame's ragged play, the team played poor football throughout the greater part of the game. The locals had a decided advantage in weight, but the interference was ragged and the linemen failed to charge with the aggressiveness of former Notre Dame forwards."

=== Mount Union ===
Football Review: "Mount Union College arrived at Cartier Field on October 11th. This contest we must confess, was more or less farcical. First appearances indicated that the game would be very close. At the finish of the first period the score was tied at 7 all. The remainder of the game was very much different from the first quarter. The result was 60 to 7."

The Indianapolis Star: "Displaying powerful attack and sturdy defense which held their opponents at bay for three of the four quarters, Notre Dame vanquished Mt. Union 60 to 7. . . . Mohardt threw the crowd into shrieking pandemonium by dashing eighty yards for a touchdown in the second quarter, completing one of the greatest runs ever seen on Cartier Field. Bergman's twenty-five yard sprint [sic] through the entire team for a touchdown in the third quarter also elicited plaudits from the crowd. Gipp divided honors with Mohardt and Bergman."

=== Nebraska ===
Football Review: "The following Saturday found the Gold and Blue at Lincoln, Nebraska, where they had journeyed for the sole purpose of defeating the University of Nebraska eleven. This end was accomplished by a score of 14 to 9. This was the biggest event of the season for the 'Cornhuskers' and they put up a good fight. Bergman and Gipp were too much for the farmers, and aided by Bahan's headwork, the 'Fighting Irish' registered another victory - the first one of the season on a foreign field."

The Indianapolis Star credited Notre Dame's "superiority in aerial football" and a long kickoff return by John Bergman for the victory. The paper described Bergman's return: "Bergman's run to a touchdown followed the kickoff, was not a fluke, but the result of a cleverly conceived play. Half back Gipp caught the kickoff feinting toward the south side of the field and then shot the ball to Bergman on a short pass. The Cornhusker tacklers had been drawn over to head off Gipp, and the flashy Bergman, rated as one of the speediest back field players in American football, darted down the other side of the gridiron. Anderson, a Notre Dame guard, headed the interference, spilling McGlasson, Nebraska's safety man and Bergman romped across the Cornhuskers' goal."

=== Western State Normal ===
Football Review: "The next visitors at Cartier Field were the eleven of the Western State Normal. This game was more or less farcical also. They came upon the field with a rather victorious spirit, having recently defeated M. A. C. and Wabash. Appearances were that they intended to appropriate another victory - until the game began. Then appearances changed. Rockne's men gained 'ad libitum.' The curtain fell at 53 to 0."

Chicago Tribune: "Outplaying Western Normal in every department of the game, Notre Dame trampled over the Michigan Pedagogs in a slow game today, 53 to 0. Notre Dame relied on straight football to trounce the visitors. Only three passes were attempted, two of which were successful."

=== Indiana ===
Football Review: "Washington Park in Indianapolis was the scene of the next. battle. Notre Dame was accompanied by six hundred rooters, who had secured a special train for the occasion. The air was laden with N.D. spirit. The game was played in the rain and on a field of mud. Rockne saved most of the stars for the Army game, so that in the latter part, Indiana was struggling with a bunch of substitutes. 'Hunk' Anderson, Gipp, and Slackford showed great skill in manouvering in the mud. The final count was 16 to 3."

Indiana Daily Student: "Indiana's football team went down to defeat Saturday at the hands of the magnificent Notre Dame combination, by a 16 to 3 count. Despite the handicap of playing on a field which was in most places three inches deep in mud and water, the flashy Irish backfield was able to make long and consistent gains by forward passes and end runs, and the opposing line baffled the crimson offense at almost every stage of the contest. Indiana was not outfought, but was outclassed. The work of Gipp and Bergman featured the contest throughout for Notre Dame. Indeed,the Irish backfield is one of the speediest and most brilliant ever seen on a Hoosier gridiron."

=== Army ===
Football Review: "On the following Saturday the Gold and Blue met her ancient enemy on the Cadet's field at West Point. Bergman did not accompany the team. He injured his knee in the Indiana game. In the first half of the game things looked pretty bad for our squad. However, the old fighting spirit carried them through, and once more the flag of Notre Dame was raised in victory over the officers by a score of 12 to 9."

Archie Ward in 'The Indianapolis Star: "The Army was defeated cleanly and decisively. . . . Standing head and shoulders above every individual player on the field was George Gipp of Notre Dame. His clever forward passing turned the tide against the Army. His end runs and stellar defensive work assisted materially in the victory."

=== Michigan Aggies ===
Football Review: "On the 15th of November Cartier Field was honored by the presence of the Michigan Aggies. They were accompanied by two hundred rooters and a fifty-piece band. They entered the camp of the "Rockmen" with a strong determination to carry home the bacon. The Aggies had a far heavier team but the fast work of Bahan, Slackford, Gipp and Kirk was too much for the farmers. The contest was brought to a close 13 to 0 by a sensational pass, Gipp to Kirk."

Archie Ward in The South Bend News-Times: "Forever enshrined in the hearts of all loyal sons of Notre Dame, to be honored, respected and revered, and spoken lovingly of wherever and whenever Gold and Blue men gather together are the names of George Gipp and Bernie Kirk. The cunning arm of one and the vigilant eye of the other enabled the Gold and Blue to flaunt above the colors of M. A. C. Saturday afternoon.

=== Purdue ===
Football Review: "The eighth consecutive victory was registered at Lafayette, where the N. D. squad had travelled to meet Purdue. The team was slightly overconfident at the beginning of the game, having defeated the Army so gallantly, and the 'Boilermakers' scored a touchdown in the first quarter. The 'Irish' soon found themselves, however; and Bergman and Kirk fixed things up in the second period. In the last half, successive passes in which Gipp, 'Hunk' Anderson, Trafton and Kirk figured, resulted in a final count of 33 to 13."

The Huntington Press: "Notre Dame tonight is undisputed football champion of Indiana . . . Purdue made the first score and held Notre Dame scoreless in the first period but in the second period the latter team started an aerial attack in which Gipp and Kirk were the principal performers and piled up score after score with ease."

=== Morningside ===
Football Review: "On Thanksgiving day the Blue and Gold journeyed to Sioux City to meet Morningside. The game was played amid snow flakes and the temperature registered ten above. A fumble at the beginning of the game gave Morningside their only marker. Brandy broke through for a touchdown and 'George' followed his example. The scoring ended at 14 to 7."

The South Bend Tribune: "The game was played in bleak winter weather. There was a light snow falling and the temperature was 10 degrees above zero. Nevertheless 10,000 persons stayed through the game. Notre Dame finished the season without a tie or defeat, being the only leading team in the middle west to accomplish the feat."
