= 1919 Saint Louis Billikens football team =

American college football season

1919 Saint Louis Billikens football
- Conference: Independent
- Record: 4–2–2
- Head coach: Charles M. Rademacher (2nd season)
- Home stadium: Sportsman's Park

1919 Midwestern college football independents records
	Conf.			Overall
Team	W	L	T	W		L		T
Notre Dame		–		9	–	0	–	0
Lincoln (MO)		–		3	–	0	–	0
Detroit		–		8	–	1	–	0
Western State Normal		–		4	–	1	–	0
Akron		–		6	–	1	–	1
North Dakota Agricultural		–		5	–	1	–	1
Haskell		–		8	–	2	–	1
Marquette		–		5	–	1	–	2
St. Xavier		–		6	–	2	–	0
Morningside		–		6	–	2	–	0
Heidelberg		–		6	–	3	–	0
Saint Louis		–		4	–	2	–	2
Valparaiso		–		5	–	3	–	0
Wabash		–		4	–	3	–	2
Central Michigan		–		2	–	2	–	3
Michigan Agricultural		–		4	–	4	–	1
Nebraska		–		3	–	3	–	2
St. Mary's (OH)		–		2	–	2	–	0
Iowa State Teachers		–		2	–	4	–	1
Toledo		–		2	–	4	–	0
Butler		–		0	–	5	–	1
Bowling Green		–		0	–	3	–	0

The 1919 Saint Louis Billikens football team was an American football team that represented Saint Louis University as an independent during the 1919 college football season. In their second season under head coach Charles M. Rademacher, the Billikens compiled a 4–2–2 record and outscored opponents by a total of 71 to 28. The team played its home games at Sportsman's Park at St. Louis.

== Schedule ==
Date	Time	Opponent	Site	Result	Attendance	Source
October 6		Alumni	Sportsman's Park; St. Louis, MO	W 14–0		
October 13		Cape Girardeau Normal	Sportsman's Park; St. Louis, MO	W 33–7		
October 18		Lombard	Sportsman's Park; St. Louis, MO	T 0–0		
October 25		Missouri Mines	Sportsman's Park; St. Louis, MO	W 21–0		
November 1		Valparaiso	Sportsman's Park; St. Louis, MO	W 3–0		
November 8		Marquette	Sportsman's Park; St. Louis, MO	T 0–0	4,000	
November 15		at Drury	Springfield, MO	L 0–14		
November 27	2:30 p.m.	Washington University	Sportsman's Park; St. Louis, MO	L 0–7	12,000	
All times are in Central time
