= 1919 Michigan Agricultural Aggies football team =

American college football season

1919 Michigan Agricultural Aggies football
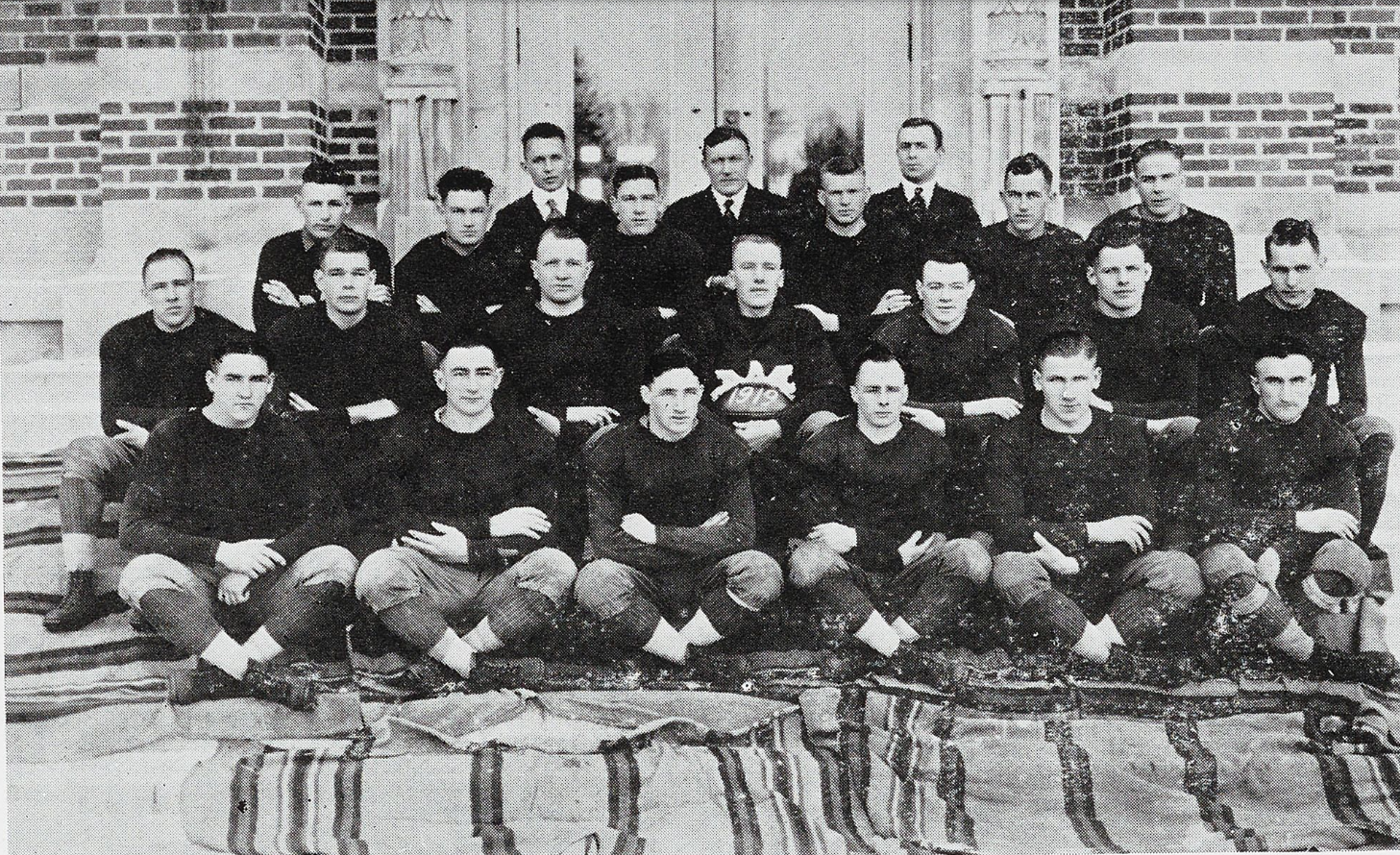
- Conference: Independent
- Record: 4–4–1
- Head coach: Chester Brewer (10th season)
- Captain: Harry E. Franson
- Home stadium: College Field

1919 Midwestern college football independents records
	Conf.			Overall
Team	W	L	T	W		L		T
Notre Dame		–		9	–	0	–	0
Lincoln (MO)		–		3	–	0	–	0
Detroit		–		8	–	1	–	0
Western State Normal		–		4	–	1	–	0
Akron		–		6	–	1	–	1
North Dakota Agricultural		–		5	–	1	–	1
Haskell		–		8	–	2	–	1
Marquette		–		5	–	1	–	2
St. Xavier		–		6	–	2	–	0
Morningside		–		6	–	2	–	0
Heidelberg		–		6	–	3	–	0
Saint Louis		–		4	–	2	–	2
Valparaiso		–		5	–	3	–	0
Wabash		–		4	–	3	–	2
Central Michigan		–		2	–	2	–	3
Michigan Agricultural		–		4	–	4	–	1
Nebraska		–		3	–	3	–	2
St. Mary's (OH)		–		2	–	2	–	0
Iowa State Teachers		–		2	–	4	–	1
Toledo		–		2	–	4	–	0
Butler		–		0	–	5	–	1
Bowling Green		–		0	–	3	–	0

The 1919 Michigan Agricultural Aggies football team represented Michigan Agricultural College (MAC) as an independent during the 1919 college football season. In their tenth non-consecutive year under head coach Chester Brewer (Brewer previously coached the Aggies from 1903 to 1910 and in 1917), the Aggies compiled a 4–4–1 record and outscored their opponents 132 to 99.

== Schedule ==
Date	Opponent	Site	Result	Attendance	Source
October 4	Albion	College Field; East Lansing, MI	W 14–13		
October 8	Alma	College Field; East Lansing, MI	W 46–6		
October 11	Western State Normal	College Field; East Lansing, MI	L 18–21		
October 18	at Michigan	Ferry Field; Ann Arbor, MI (rivalry)	L 0–26	21,000	
October 25	DePauw	College Field; East Lansing, MI	W 27–0		
November 1	at Purdue	Stuart Field; West Lafayette, IN	L 7–13		
November 8	South Dakota^{†}	College Field; East Lansing, MI	W 13–0		
November 15	at Notre Dame	Cartier Field; Notre Dame, IN (rivalry)	L 0–13	5,000	
November 27	Wabash	College Field; East Lansing, MI	T 7–7		
^{†}Homecoming
