= Walt Clago =

American football player (1899–1955)

- Clago with the Detroit Tigers in 1921

Profile
- Position: End

Personal information
- Born: June 28, 1899; Gibraltar, Michigan, U.S.
- Died: January 16, 1955 (aged 55); Phoenix, Arizona, U.S.
- Listed height: 6 ft 0 in (1.83 m)
- Listed weight: 195 lb (88 kg)

Career information
- High school: Cass Technical (Detroit, Michigan)
- College: Detroit

Career history
- Detroit Tigers (1921); Rock Island Independents (1922)
- Stats at Pro Football Reference

Walter M. Clago (June 28, 1899 – January 16, 1955) was an American football end who played two seasons in the National Football League (NFL) with the Detroit Tigers (1921) and Rock Island Independents (1922). He played college football for the University of Detroit Titans football team in 1919 and also served in the United States Army (1916–1919), Detroit Police Department (1920–1945), and Pima County Sheriff's Department (1951–1955).

== Early life ==
Clago was born in Gibraltar, Michigan, in 1899. His parents were Bezallet Burton "Zalie" Clago and Catherine (Manausan) Clago. He attended Cass Technical High School in Detroit.

Clago enlisted in the United States Army on June 1, 1916, shortly before his 17th birthday. He served on the Mexican border prior to the United States entry into World War I. When the United States entered the war, Clago was sent to France where he was injured, received the Purple Heart, and reached the rank of sergeant. He was discharged from the military on June 1, 1919.

After his discharge from the Army, Clago enrolled at the University of Detroit and became a star football player in 1919.

== Professional football ==
In August 1920, Clago joined the Detroit Police Department. While serving with the police department, he also played two seasons of professional football in the early years of the NFL. He appeared in seven games as a left end for the 1921 Detroit Tigers and seven games as a right end for the 1922 Rock Island Independents.

== Policing career ==
After his football career ended, Clago remained with the Detroit Police Department until 1945. He was commander of the department's motor division when he retired. After retiring from the Detroit Police Department, Clago moved to Tucson, Arizona, where he had served in the Army prior to World War I. In 1951, he joined the Pima County Sheriff's Department as a night captain. He lived in the Tucson mountains and was promoted to undersheriff in June 1953.

== Family and death ==
Clago was married twice. He married Gertrude Richwine in April 1920. They had a daughter (Joyce Lee) and two sons (Laurence and Walter). Gertrude died in September 1953, and Clago married his second wife, Phyllis, in December 1953.

In January 1955, Clago died at age 55 from a cerebral hemorrhage at a Phoenix hospital.
