= 1919 Wooster Presbyterians football team =

American college football season

1919 Wooster Presbyterians football
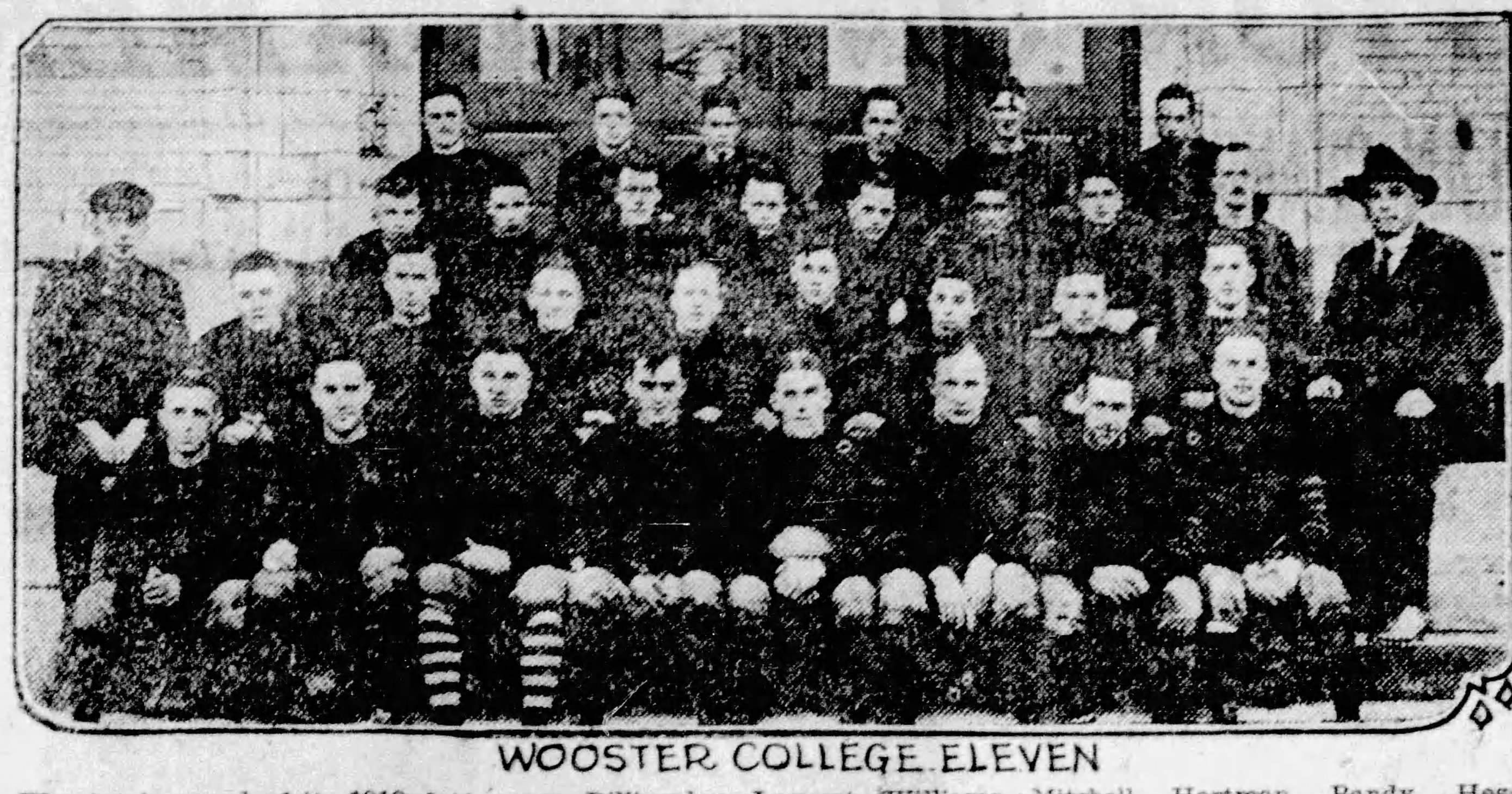

OAC champion
- Conference: Ohio Athletic Conference
- Record: 8–0 (7–0 OAC)
- Head coach: Lawrence C. Boles (5th season)
- Home stadium: Severance Stadium

1919 Ohio Athletic Conference football standings
	Conf.					Overall
Team	W		L		T	W		L		T
Wooster $	7	–	0	–	0	8	–	0	–	0
Oberlin	5	–	0	–	0	7	–	1	–	0
Ohio State	2	–	0	–	0	6	–	1	–	0
Miami (OH)	7	–	1	–	0	7	–	1	–	0
Wittenberg	3	–	0	–	2	6	–	0	–	2
Akron	5	–	1	–	1	6	–	1	–	1
Denison	4	–	2	–	1	6	–	2	–	1
Western Reserve	3	–	3	–	0	5	–	4	–	0
Ohio Wesleyan	3	–	3	–	0	4	–	4	–	0
Case	2	–	4	–	1	3	–	6	–	1
Ohio	2	–	4	–	0	3	–	5	–	0
Cincinnati	1	–	3	–	1	3	–	4	–	1
Mount Union	0	–	5	–	0	1	–	7	–	0
Ohio Northern	0	–	6	–	0	1	–	8	–	0
Baldwin–Wallace	0	–	5	–	0	0	–	8	–	0
Kenyon	0	–	7	–	0	0	–	7	–	0
$ – Conference champion

The 1919 Wooster Presbyterians football team was an American football team that represented the College of Wooster of Wooster, Ohio, as a member of the Ohio Athletic Conference (OAC) during the 1919 college football season. In their fifth year under head coach Lawrence C. Boles, the Presbyterians compiled a perfect 8–0 record (7–0 in conference games), won the OAC championship, shut out seven of eight opponents, and outscored all opponents by a total of 235 to 7. Wooster held opponents scoreless for 13 consecutive games from October 25, 1919, to November 25, 1920; Mount Union broke the streak with three points on a field goal on November 25, 1920. The 1919 season was the first of three perfect seasons for Wooster under Boles, the Presbyterians having also accomplished the feat in 1920 and 1923.

Four Wooster players received first- or second-team honors on the 1919 All-OAC football teams: Roderick at halfback (CPD-1, Prugh-1, Post-1); Snyder at quarterback (CPD-1, Post-2); Walker at tackle (CPD-2); and Atkinson at halfback (Prugh-2).

The team played its home games at Severance Stadium in Wooster, Ohio.

== Schedule ==
Date	Opponent	Site	Result	Attendance	Source
October 4	Hiram*	Severance Stadium; Wooster, OH	W 47–0		
October 11	Baldwin–Wallace	Severance Stadium; Wooster, OH	W 57–0		
October 18	at Western Reserve	Cleveland, OH	W 13–7		
October 25	Case	Severance Stadium; Wooster, OH	W 26–0		
October 311	at Ohio Northern	Ada, OH	W 13–0		
November 8	Akron	Severance Stadium; Wooster, OH	W 19–0		
November 15	at Kenyon	Gambier, OH	W 25–0		
November 27	at Mount Union	Alliance, OH	W 35–0		
*Non-conference game

== Game summaries ==
=== Hiram ===
On October 4, Wooster opened its 1919 season with a 47–0 victory over Hiram College at Severance Stadium in Wooster, Ohio. Wooster's first-team players scored 34 points in the first quarter. Quarterback Snyder scored two touchdowns. Wooster played substitutes for the remainder of the game. Hiram's offense did not move into Wooster territory.

=== Baldwin-Wallace ===
On October 11, Wooster defeated Baldwin–Wallace, 57–0, at Wooster. The game was played in the rain on a wet and muddy field. Neither team threw a pass. Wooster made its gains through the line and scored four touchdowns in the second quarter and three touchdowns in the third quarter.

=== Western Reserve ===
On October 18, Wooster defeated Western Reserve, 13–7, in Cleveland. Western Reserve was the only team to score points against Wooster during the 1919 season. On the first play from scrimmage after the opening kickoff, Western Reserve fumbled, and Wooster took over at the 11-yard line. Wooster then scored its first touchdown on three running plays. Wooster scored again on its next possession. Western Reserve's defense stiffened, and Wooster did not score again. Western reserved scored its touchdown in the second quarter after blocking a Wooster punt.

=== Mount Union ===
The Wooster Presbyterians ended their 1919 season on November 27 with a 35–0 victory over the Mount Union Methodists "in a sea of mud" at Alliance, Ohio. The Presbyterians out-gained the Methodists by 15 first downs to four. One of the highlights of the game was a 77-yard interception return for touchdown by left halfback Atkinson. Snyder and Roderick were rated as the "big luminaries" of the game for Wooster.
