= 1919 Cincinnati Bearcats football team =

American college football season

1919 Cincinnati Bearcats football
- Conference: Ohio Athletic Conference
- Record: 3–4–1 (1–3–1 OAC)
- Head coach: Boyd Chambers (2nd season)
- Captain: Bob Stack
- Home stadium: Carson Field

1919 Ohio Athletic Conference football standings
	Conf.					Overall
Team	W		L		T	W		L		T
Wooster $	7	–	0	–	0	8	–	0	–	0
Oberlin	5	–	0	–	0	7	–	1	–	0
Ohio State	2	–	0	–	0	6	–	1	–	0
Miami (OH)	7	–	1	–	0	7	–	1	–	0
Wittenberg	3	–	0	–	2	6	–	0	–	2
Akron	5	–	1	–	1	6	–	1	–	1
Denison	4	–	2	–	1	6	–	2	–	1
Western Reserve	3	–	3	–	0	5	–	4	–	0
Ohio Wesleyan	3	–	3	–	0	4	–	4	–	0
Case	2	–	4	–	1	3	–	6	–	1
Ohio	2	–	4	–	0	3	–	5	–	0
Cincinnati	1	–	3	–	1	3	–	4	–	1
Mount Union	0	–	5	–	0	1	–	7	–	0
Ohio Northern	0	–	6	–	0	1	–	8	–	0
Baldwin–Wallace	0	–	5	–	0	0	–	8	–	0
Kenyon	0	–	7	–	0	0	–	7	–	0
$ – Conference champion

The 1919 Cincinnati Bearcats football team was an American football team that represented the University of Cincinnati as a member of the Ohio Athletic Conference during the 1919 college football season. In their second season under head coach Boyd Chambers, the Bearcats compiled a 3–4–1 record (1–3–1 against conference opponents). Bob Stack was the team captain. The team played home games at Carson Field in Cincinnati.

== Schedule ==
Date	Opponent	Site	Result	Source
October 4	Wilmington (OH)*	Carson Field; Cincinnati, OH	W 34–0	
October 11	at Ohio State	Ohio Field; Columbus, OH	L 0–46	
October 18	Kenyon	Carson Field; Cincinnati, OH	W 18–0	
October 25	Denison	Carson Field; Cincinnati, OH	L 2–9	
November 1	at Wittenberg	Springfield, OH	T 0–0	
November 8	Kentucky*	Carson Field; Cincinnati, OH	W 7–0	
November 15	at Tennessee*	Waite Field; Knoxville, TN	L 12–33	
November 28	Miami (OH)	Carson Field; Cincinnati, OH (Victory Bell)	L 0–14	
*Non-conference game
