= Leonard Bahan =

American football player (1898–1977)

Profile
- Positions: Quarterback, halfback

Personal information
- Born: February 18, 1898; Colegrove, Pennsylvania, U.S.
- Died: May 1, 1977 (aged 79); Los Angeles, California, U.S.
- Listed height: 5 ft 9 in (1.75 m)
- Listed weight: 162 lb (73 kg)

Career information
- High school: Somerset (Somerset, Kentucky)
- College: Notre Dame

Career history
- Cleveland Indians (1923); Buffalo All-Americans (1923)
- Stats at Pro Football Reference

Leonard Finlan "Pete" Bahan (February 18, 1898 – May 1, 1977) was an American professional football player in the National Football League (NFL).

Bahan played quarterback for Somerset High School in Somerset, Kentucky, and later was the team captain for both the football team and the basketball team at Notre Dame. He was the starting quarterback and team captain for the undefeated football team in 1919, which later was selected as national co-champions by the National Championship Foundation. In 1920, he enrolled at Detroit University and started for their football team at right halfback.

Bahan played for one season in the NFL in 1923, first with the Buffalo All-Americans and then with the Cleveland Indians.
