= John Stitt =

American football player and coach (1894–1976)

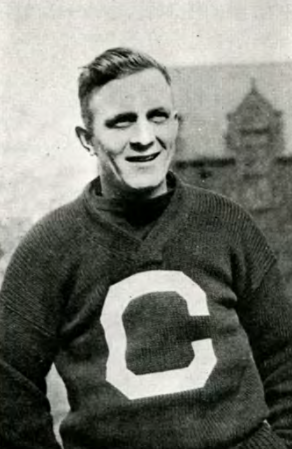
- Stitt, pictured in Differential 1919, Case School of Applied Science yearbook

Biographical details
- Born: November 21, 1894; Rudolph, Ohio, U.S.
- Died: December 30, 1976 (aged 82); Oxford, Ohio, U.S.

Playing career
- 1917: Case
- Positions: Halfback, quarterback

Coaching career (HC unless noted)
- 1919: Bowling Green

Head coaching record
- Overall: 0–3

John Albert Stitt (November 21, 1894 – December 30, 1976) was an American college football player and coach. He was the first head football coach at Bowling Green State Normal School—now known as Bowling Green State University—serving for one season in 1919 and compiling a record of 0–3.

Stitt was born November 21, 1894, in Rudolph, Ohio, to William and Mary Shepard Smith. He attended Western Reserve University before transferring to the Case School of Applied Science; the two schools later merged to form Case Western Reserve University. Stitt graduated from Case in 1918 with an engineering degree before serving in the United States Army Air Service during World War I. He was stationed at Kelly Field in San Antonio until his discharge from military service in 1919. He went to Bowling Green in September 1919 to coach the football team.

Stitt later worked as an oil producer. He married Annabell Poole in 1933. Stitt died on December 30, 1976, at McCullough-Hyde Memorial Hospital in Oxford, Ohio.

== Head coaching record ==
Year	Team	Overall	Conference	Standing	Bowl/playoffs
Bowling Green Normals (Independent) (1919)
1919	Bowling Green	0–3			
Bowling Green:		0–3			
Total:		0–3			
