= 1919 Miami Redskins football team =

American college football season

1919 Miami Redskins football
- Conference: Ohio Athletic Conference
- Record: 7–1 (7–1 OAC)
- Head coach: George Little (2nd season)
- Home stadium: Miami Field

1919 Ohio Athletic Conference football standings
	Conf.					Overall
Team	W		L		T	W		L		T
Wooster $	7	–	0	–	0	8	–	0	–	0
Oberlin	5	–	0	–	0	7	–	1	–	0
Ohio State	2	–	0	–	0	6	–	1	–	0
Miami (OH)	7	–	1	–	0	7	–	1	–	0
Wittenberg	3	–	0	–	2	6	–	0	–	2
Akron	5	–	1	–	1	6	–	1	–	1
Denison	4	–	2	–	1	6	–	2	–	1
Western Reserve	3	–	3	–	0	5	–	4	–	0
Ohio Wesleyan	3	–	3	–	0	4	–	4	–	0
Case	2	–	4	–	1	3	–	6	–	1
Ohio	2	–	4	–	0	3	–	5	–	0
Cincinnati	1	–	3	–	1	3	–	4	–	1
Mount Union	0	–	5	–	0	1	–	7	–	0
Ohio Northern	0	–	6	–	0	1	–	8	–	0
Baldwin–Wallace	0	–	5	–	0	0	–	8	–	0
Kenyon	0	–	7	–	0	0	–	7	–	0
$ – Conference champion

The 1919 Miami Redskins football team was an American football team that represented Miami University as a member of the Ohio Athletic Conference (OAC) during the 1919 college football season. In its second season under head coach George Little, Miami compiled a 7–1 record (7–1 against conference opponents) and finished in fourth place out of 16 teams in the OAC.

== Schedule ==
Date	Opponent	Site	Result
October 4	Kenyon	Miami Field; Oxford, OH	W 26–0
October 11	at Case	Cleveland, OH	W 7–2
October 18	Ohio Wesleyan	Miami Field; Oxford, OH	W 13–7
October 25	Oberlin	Miami Field; Oxford, OH	L 0–13
November 1	vs. Denison	Dayton, OH	W 14–0
November 8	Ohio Northern	Miami Field; Oxford, OH	W 60–0
November 15	at Mount Union	Ada, OH	W 13–10
November 28	at Cincinnati	Carson Field; Cincinnati, OH (Victory Bell)	W 14–0
