= George O'Brien (baseball) =

American baseball player (1889-1966)

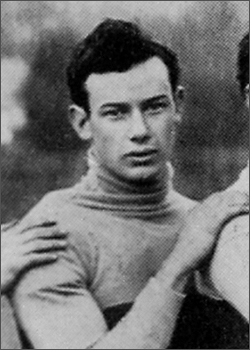
- Catcher
- Born: November 4, 1889; Cleveland, Ohio, U.S.
- Died: March 24, 1966 (aged 76); Columbus, Ohio, U.S.
- Batted: Right Threw: Right

MLB debut
- August 16, 1915, for the St. Louis Browns

Last MLB appearance
- August 23, 1915, for the St. Louis Browns

MLB statistics
- Games played: 3
- At bats: 9
- Hits: 2
- Stats at Baseball Reference

Teams
- St. Louis Browns (1915)

George Joseph O'Brien (November 4, 1889 – March 24, 1966) was an American professional baseball player and college sports coach and administrator. He played Major League Baseball as a catcher for the St. Louis Browns in 1915. O'Brien later coached and served as athletic director at Mount Union College—now known as the University of Mount Union—in Alliance, Ohio.

== Head coaching record ==
=== Football ===
Year	Team	Overall	Conference	Standing	Bowl/playoffs
Mount Union Purple (Ohio Athletic Conference) (1917–1919)
1917	Mount Union	2–6	1–5	12th	
1918	Mount Union	6–1	5–1	T–3rd	
1919	Mount Union	1–7	0–5	T–13th	
Mount Union:		9–14	6–11		
Total:		9–14			
