= 1919 Mount Union Purple football team =

American college football season

1919 Mount Union Purple football
- Conference: Ohio Athletic Conference
- Record: 1–7 (0–5 OAC)
- Head coach: George O'Brien (3rd season)
- Home stadium: Mount Union Stadium

1919 Ohio Athletic Conference football standings
| | Conf. | | | | | Overall |
| Team | W | | L | | T | W | | L | | T |
|---|---|---|---|---|---|---|---|---|---|---|
| Wooster $ | 7 | – | 0 | – | 0 | 8 | – | 0 | – | 0 |
| Oberlin | 5 | – | 0 | – | 0 | 7 | – | 1 | – | 0 |
| Ohio State | 2 | – | 0 | – | 0 | 6 | – | 1 | – | 0 |
| Miami (OH) | 7 | – | 1 | – | 0 | 7 | – | 1 | – | 0 |
| Wittenberg | 3 | – | 0 | – | 2 | 6 | – | 0 | – | 2 |
| Akron | 5 | – | 1 | – | 1 | 6 | – | 1 | – | 1 |
| Denison | 4 | – | 2 | – | 1 | 6 | – | 2 | – | 1 |
| Western Reserve | 3 | – | 3 | – | 0 | 5 | – | 4 | – | 0 |
| Ohio Wesleyan | 3 | – | 3 | – | 0 | 4 | – | 4 | – | 0 |
| Case | 2 | – | 4 | – | 1 | 3 | – | 6 | – | 1 |
| Ohio | 2 | – | 4 | – | 0 | 3 | – | 5 | – | 0 |
| Cincinnati | 1 | – | 3 | – | 1 | 3 | – | 4 | – | 1 |
| Mount Union | 0 | – | 5 | – | 0 | 1 | – | 7 | – | 0 |
| Ohio Northern | 0 | – | 6 | – | 0 | 1 | – | 8 | – | 0 |
| Baldwin–Wallace | 0 | – | 5 | – | 0 | 0 | – | 8 | – | 0 |
| Kenyon | 0 | – | 7 | – | 0 | 0 | – | 7 | – | 0 |
$ – Conference champion

The 1919 Mount Union Purple football team was an American football team that represented Mount Union College (now known as University of Mount Union) during the 1919 college football season as a member of the Ohio Athletic Conference (OAC). Led by George O'Brien in his third and final year as head coach, Mount Union compiled a record of 1–7 overall with a mark of 0–5 in OAC play.

== Schedule ==
| Date | Opponent | Site | Result | Attendance | Source |
|---|---|---|---|---|---|
| September 27? | Canton High School* | Alliance, OH | W 61–0 | | |
| October 4 | West Virginia Wesleyan* | Alliance, OH | L 0–34 | | |
| October 11 | Notre Dame* | Cartier Field; Notre Dame, IN | L 7–60 | 4,000 | |
| October 18 | Oberlin | Oberlin, OH | L 13–34 | | |
| November 1 | Akron | Buchtel Field; Akron, OH | L 0–22 | | |
| November 8 | Case | Alliance, OH | L 12–27 | | |
| November 15 | Miami (OH) | Alliance, OH | L 10–13 | | |
| November 27 | Wooster | Alliance, OH | L 0–35 | | |
*Non-conference game
