= 2020–21 Northern State Wolves men's basketball team =

American college basketball season

2020–21 Northern State Wolves men's basketball
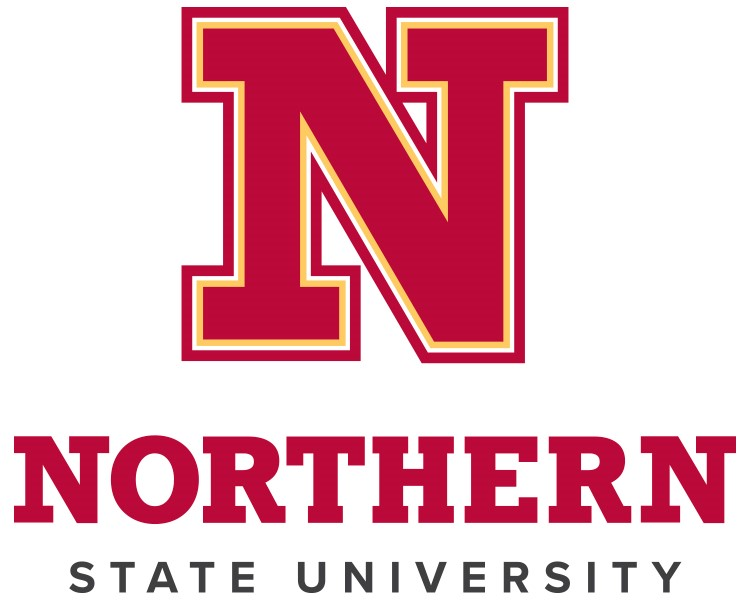

NSIC North Division and tournament champions
- Conference: Northern Sun Intercollegiate Conference
- Record: 19–2 (13–1 NSIC)
- Head coach: Saul Phillips (2nd season)
- Assistant coaches: Josh Vaughan; Taylor Tucker; Jacob Kornmann
- Home arena: Wachs Arena

2020–21 Northern Sun Intercollegiate Conference men's basketball standings
	Conf.				Overall
Team	W		L	PCT	W		L	PCT
North
Northern State †	13	–	1	.929	19	–	2	.905
MSU–Moorhead	9	–	1	.900	11	–	5	.688
Minot State	6	–	4	.600	9	–	7	.563
St. Cloud State	6	–	6	.500	8	–	9	.471
Bemidji State	6	–	8	.429	7	–	9	.438
Minnesota Duluth	5	–	7	.417	6	–	7	.462
Mary	4	–	10	.286	4	–	12	.250
Minnesota Crookston	1	–	13	.071	2	–	14	.125
South
Wayne State	10	–	4	.714	11	–	7	.611
Upper Iowa	8	–	4	.667	10	–	7	.588
Minnesota State	9	–	5	.643	10	–	7	.588
Augustana	7	–	6	.538	9	–	7	.563
Sioux Falls	5	–	5	.500	7	–	5	.583
Winona State	5	–	5	.500	7	–	6	.538
SW Minnesota State	1	–	6	.143	3	–	8	.273
Concordia–St. Paul	0	–	10	.000	1	–	13	.071
† NSIC tournament winner As of May 22, 2021; Rankings from AP poll

The 2020–21 Northern State Wolves men's basketball team represented Northern State University in the 2020–21 NCAA Division II men's basketball season. The Wolves were led by second-year head coach Saul Phillips and played their home games at Wachs Arena in Aberdeen, South Dakota. They competed as members of the Northern Sun Intercollegiate Conference (NSIC). Due to the COVID-19 pandemic, their season was greatly shortened.

== Previous season ==
Following the departure of Paul Sather to North Dakota, Saul Phillips was hired as the head coach of the Wolves. During his first year, the Wolves went 26–6 (18–4 NSIC) and won both the NSIC regular-season championship and the NSIC tournament championship, the latter of which gave them the #4 seed in the 2020 NCAA Division II men's basketball tournament, which was eventually cancelled due to the COVID-19 pandemic.

== Roster ==
2020–21 Northern State Wolves men's basketball team
Players
Coaches

Pos.	#	Name	Height	Weight	Year	Hometown
G	0	Jaylen Robinson	6 ft 1 in (1.85 m)	165 lb (75 kg)	So	Hamilton, OH
G	1	Tommy Chatman	6 ft 4 in (1.93 m)	190 lb (86 kg)	So	Brooklyn Park, MN
G	2	Mason Stark	6 ft 2 in (1.88 m)	170 lb (77 kg)	Jr	Chandler, AZ
G	3	Andrew Kallman	6 ft 4 in (1.93 m)	175 lb (79 kg)	Sr	Chaska, MN
G/F	4	Kobe Busch	6 ft 5 in (1.96 m)	205 lb (93 kg)	Fr	Huron, SD
F	5	Cole Bergan	6 ft 7 in (2.01 m)	220 lb (100 kg)	So	Aberdeen, SD
G	10	Roko Dominovic	6 ft 4 in (1.93 m)	190 lb (86 kg)	Sr	Split, Croatia
G	11	Augustin Reede	6 ft 2 in (1.88 m)	175 lb (79 kg)	So	Aberdeen, SD
G	12	Maxwell Nielson	5 ft 11 in (1.8 m)	170 lb (77 kg)	Fr	Volga, SD
F	15	Justin Streit	6 ft 4 in (1.93 m)	200 lb (91 kg)	Fr	Watkins, MN
G	21	Andrew Rohrbach	6 ft 0 in (1.83 m)	165 lb (75 kg)	Fr	Aberdeen, SD
F	23	Jordan Belka	6 ft 7 in (2.01 m)	195 lb (88 kg)	Jr	Rogers, MN
F	24	Parker Fox	6 ft 8 in (2.03 m)	210 lb (95 kg)	Jr	Mahtomedi, MN
F	25	Solomon Bach	6 ft 6 in (1.98 m)	215 lb (98 kg)	Fr	Watertown, SD
F	33	Jacob Streit	6 ft 4 in (1.93 m)	215 lb (98 kg)	So	Watkins, MN
C	35	Gavin Terhark	6 ft 9 in (2.06 m)	215 lb (98 kg)	Fr	Brandon, SD
F	41	Austin Holt	6 ft 5 in (1.96 m)	200 lb (91 kg)	So	Littleton, CO
F	55	Josh Schloe	6 ft 6 in (1.98 m)	220 lb (100 kg)	Fr	Sauk Rapids, MN

Head coach

- Saul Phillips

Assistant coach(es)

- Josh Vaughan
- Taylor Tucker
- Jacob Kornmann

Legend

- (C) Team captain
- (S) Suspended
- (I) Ineligible
- (W) Walk-on
- Injured
- Current redshirt

Roster
Last update: July 15, 2024

== Schedule and results ==
Date time, TV	Rank^{#}	Opponent^{#}	Result	Record	Site (attendance) city, state
Non-conference regular season
January 2, 2021*; 3:30 p.m.		at Wayne State	W 66–62	1–0	Rice Auditorium (125); Wayne, NE
January 3, 2021*; 1:30 p.m.		at Wayne State	W 64–51	2–0	Rice Auditorium (129); Wayne, NE
NSIC regular season
January 8, 2021; 6:00 p.m.		Bemidji State	W 71–57	3–0 (1–0)	BSU Gymnasium (69); Bemidji, MN
January 9, 2021; 3:30 p.m.		Bemidji State	W 100–63	4–0 (2–0)	BSU Gymnasium (69); Bemidji, MN
January 15, 2021; 7:00 p.m.		Minnesota Crookston	W 86–67	5–0 (3–0)	Wachs Arena (804); Aberdeen, SD
January 16, 2021; 4:00 p.m.		Minnesota Crookston	W 88–64	6–0 (4–0)	Wachs Arena (689); Aberdeen, SD
January 22, 2021; 6:00 p.m.		St. Cloud State	W 79–74	7–0 (5–0)	Halenbeck Hall (98); St. Cloud, MN
January 23, 2021; 4:00 p.m.		St. Cloud State	W 81–72	8–0 (6–0)	Halenbeck Hall (99); St. Cloud, MN
January 29, 2021; 7:00 p.m.		Minnesota Duluth	W 83–72	9–0 (7–0)	Wachs Arena (1,141); Aberdeen, SD
January 30, 2021; 4:00 p.m.		Minnesota Duluth	W 64–58	10–0 (8–0)	Wachs Arena (1,362); Aberdeen, SD
February 5, 2021; 6:00 p.m.		Mary	W 83–76	11–0 (9–0)	McDowell Activity Center (250); Bismarck, ND
February 6, 2021; 6:00 p.m.		Mary	W 70–59	12–0 (10–0)	McDowell Activity Center (250); Bismarck, ND
February 12, 2021; 7:00 p.m.		Minot State	W 87–77	13–0 (11–0)	Wachs Arena (1,311); Aberdeen, SD
February 13, 2021; 4:00 p.m.		Minot State	W 75–64	14–0 (12–0)	Wachs Arena (1,205); Aberdeen, SD
February 19, 2021; 7:00 p.m.		MSU–Moorhead	W 90–83	15–0 (13–0)	Wachs Arena (1,492); Aberdeen, SD
February 20, 2021; 4:00 p.m.		MSU–Moorhead	L 86–93	15–1 (13–1)	Wachs Arena (1,408); Aberdeen, SD
NSIC tournament
February 25, 2021; 4:00 p.m.		Augustana	W 87–84	16–1	Sanford Pentagon (73); Sioux Falls, SD
February 27, 2021; 4:00 p.m.		Minot State	W 72–63	17–1	Sanford Pentagon (73); Sioux Falls, SD
February 28, 2021; 4:00 p.m.		MSU–Moorhead	W 78–57	18–1	Sanford Pentagon (88); Sioux Falls, SD
NCAA DII tournament
March 14, 2021; 5:00 p.m.		MSU–Moorhead	W 77–65	19–1	Wachs Arena (1,700); Aberdeen, SD
March 16, 2021; 7:00 p.m.		Northwest Missouri State	L 86–91	19–2	Wachs Arena (1,750); Aberdeen, SD
*Non-conference game. ^{#}Rankings from AP poll. (#) Tournament seedings in parentheses. All times are in Central.
