= Elton Rynearson =

American athlete, coach, and administrator (1893–1967)

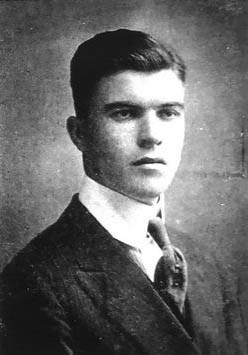

Biographical details
- Born: April 7, 1893; Three Oaks, Michigan, U.S.
- Died: February 8, 1967 (aged 73); Ann Arbor, Michigan, U.S.

Playing career

Football
- 1910–1913: Michigan State Normal

Basketball
- 1910–1914: Michigan State Normal

Baseball
- c. 1912: Michigan State Normal
- 1913–1914: Kalamazoo Kazoos
- 1915: Brantford Red Sox

Coaching career (HC unless noted)

Football
- 1916: Michigan State Normal (assistant)
- 1917: Michigan State Normal
- 1919–1920: [Michigan State Normal
- 1925–1948: Michigan State Normal

Basketball
- 1917–1921: Michigan State Normal
- 1925–1932: Michigan State Normal
- 1935–1940: Michigan State Normal
- 1944–1946: Michigan State Normal

Baseball
- 1920–1921: Michigan State Normal

Administrative career (AD unless noted)
- 1948–1963: Michigan State Normal / Eastern Michigan

Head coaching record
- Overall: 114–58–15 (football); 160–129 (basketball); 9–14 (baseball)

Accomplishments and honors

Championships
- Football; 1 MIAA (1925); 4 MCC (1927–1930)

Elton James Rynearson Sr. (April 7, 1893 – February 8, 1967) was an American athlete, coach, and college athletics administrator. He was affiliated with Eastern Michigan University (known as Michigan State Normal College prior to 1956) for most of his life, beginning his association with the school as a student in 1910 and retiring as the school's athletic director in 1963.

== Biography ==
Rynearson was born in Three Oaks, Michigan. He was the son of Isaiah Rynearson and Grace Ann McCarten. He attended Michigan State Normal College from 1910 to 1914 and played for the football, baseball, and basketball teams. He was the captain of the basketball team his junior and his senior year, during which time the team achieved a record of 17–8. Eastern Michigan University records also list Rynearson as the basketball team captain for the 1916–17 season, in which the team's record was 15–1.

Rynearson played three years of minor league baseball from 1913 to 1915 for the Kalamazoo Kazoos in the Southern Michigan League (1913–1914) and the Brantford Red Sox in the Canadian League (1915).

The 1916 Michigan State Normal College yearbook, The Aurora, lists Rynearson as an assistant coach of the football team, and he assumed head coaching responsibilities in 1917. Over the course of his career, he coached at least one year in every varsity sport at Michigan State Normal, including football, basketball, baseball and track. In 28 years as the head football coach, Rynearson compiled a record of 114–58–15. He led the 1925 and 1927 football teams to undefeated 8–0 records. Between 1925 and 1927, his teams compiled a record of 22–1 and outscored their opponents by a combined score of 405 to 31. In 17 years as the basketball coach, he compiled a record of 141–100. During a four-year stretch from 1917 to 1921, he led the basketball team to a combined record of 48–9, including a one-loss season in his first year as the coach. He also served as athletic director from 1948 to 1963.

Rynearson continued to live in Ypsilanti, Michigan in his later years. In November 1966, the National Football Foundation awarded him the Willie Heston Award, given each year to an individual personifying the leadership qualities developed by football.

Rynearson suffered a heart attack on January 28, 1967, and died one week later at St. Joseph Hospital in Ann Arbor, Michigan. His funeral was held at St. John's Catholic Church in Ypsilanti.

In September 1969, Eastern Michigan dedicated its new football stadium as Rynearson Stadium. The Eastern Michigan football program has played its home games at Rynearson Stadium since the 1969 season. In 1976, Rynearson was posthumously named one of the inaugural members of the Eastern Michigan University Athletic Hall of Fame.

== Football coach ==
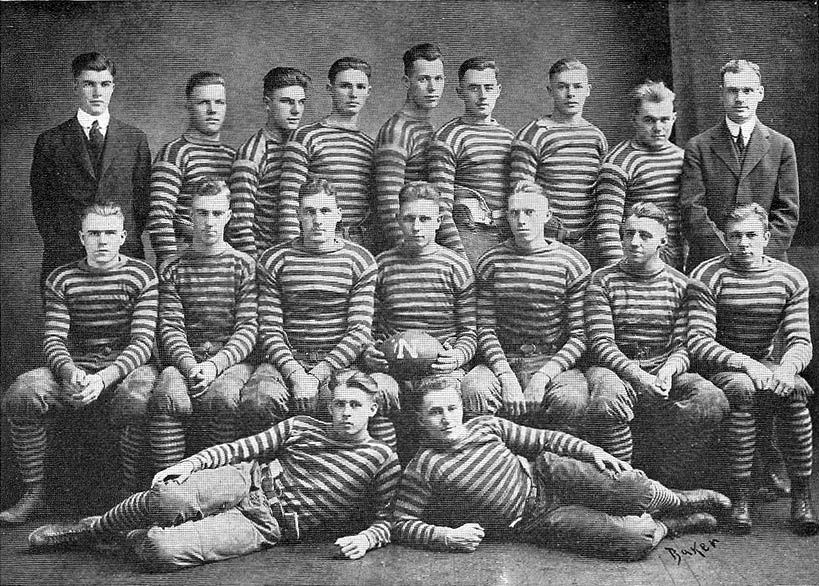
Rynearson (first from left, above) on a football team photo from the 1916 MSNC yearbook

Following the smallpox-shortened 1916 season, during which he was an assistant coach, Rynearson was hired to replace Elmer Mitchell as head coach. Although Rynearson's offense was more effective, outscoring opponents 111 to 82, more than half of the scoring came in a single game, a 63–0 rout of Central Michigan, and the team ended the season with a 3–4 record. After the shortened three-game 1918 season was coached by Lynn Bell, Rynearson returned to coach the 1919 squad to their first winning season in four years. After another winning season in 1920, other coaches assumed the duties for four years, during which the team managed a 9–15–4 record. Because of the multiple breaks in his coaching time periods, Rynearson is one of a select group of college football coaches with non-consecutive tenure.

Rynearson's return in 1925 sparked the most successful period in school history. From 1925 through 1930, the team achieved a 40–4–2 record, including perfect seasons in 1925 and 1927. From 1925 through 1927 they outscored opponents 405 points to 31 and registered 19 shutouts. They won the Michigan Intercollegiate Athletic Association Championship in 1925, and won the Michigan Collegiate Conference championships in 1927, 1928, 1929, and 1930. Although less dominant, Rynearson's teams continued to have success throughout the 1930s, never having a losing season until the teams of 1940 and 1941 combined for a 2–10–3 record. The 1943 and 1945 teams (there was no team in 1944) were again successful, combining for a 7–0–1 record. However, following the end of World War II, Rynearson's teams again struggled, and he ended his coaching career on a streak of three losing seasons from 1946 through 1948. His 26 seasons as head coach are double those of the next-longest serving coach, Fred Trosko, and no Eastern Michigan University football coach has reached even half of Rynearson's win total of 114 games.

== Basketball coach ==
Rynearson served as men's basketball coach at MSNC from 1917 to 1921, 1925 to 1932, 1935 to 1940, and 1944 to 1946. In his 18 years as the men's basketball head coach, he compiled a record of 160–129. During a four-year stretch from 1917 to 1921, he led the basketball team to a combined record of 48-11, including a one-loss season in his first year as the coach and the Michigan Intercollegiate Athletic Association Championship in 1921. His 160 career wins as coach rank second among EMU men's basketball head coaches, behind only Ben Braun.

== Head coaching record ==
=== Football ===
Year	Team	Overall	Conference	Standing	Bowl/playoffs
Michigan State Normal Normalites (Michigan Intercollegiate Athletic Association) (1917)
1917	Michigan State Normal	3–4			
Michigan State Normal Normalites (Michigan Intercollegiate Athletic Association) (1919–1920)
1919	Michigan State Normal	4–2–1			
1920	Michigan State Normal	6–2	1–2	T–4th	
Michigan State Normal Normalites (Michigan Intercollegiate Athletic Association) (1925)
1925	Michigan State Normal	8–0	5–0	1st	
Michigan State Normal Normalites (Independent) (1926)
1926	Michigan State Normal	6–1			
Michigan State Normal Normalites / Hurons (Michigan Collegiate Conference) (1927–1930)
1927	Michigan State Normal	8–0	3–0	1st	
1928	Michigan State Normal	7–1	3–0	1st	
1929	Michigan State Normal	5–1–2	2–0–1	T–1st	
1930	Michigan State Normal	6–1	3–0	1st	
Michigan State Normal Hurons (Independent) (1931–1948)
1931	Michigan State Normal	3–1–2			
1932	Michigan State Normal	5–2			
1933	Michigan State Normal	6–2			
1934	Michigan State Normal	5–2			
1935	Michigan State Normal	4–2–2			
1936	Michigan State Normal	6–2			
1937	Michigan State Normal	5–2–1			
1938	Michigan State Normal	6–1–1			
1939	Michigan State Normal	3–3–1			
1940	Michigan State Normal	1–5–1			
1941	Michigan State Normal	0–5–2			
1942	Michigan State Normal	3–3–1			
1943	Michigan State Normal	2–0			
1944	No team—World War II				
1945	Michigan State Normal	5–0–1			
1946	Michigan State Normal	3–4–1			
1947	Michigan State Normal	1–6			
1948	Michigan State Normal	3–5			
Michigan State Normal:		114–58–15			
Total:		114–58–15			
National championship Conference title Conference division title or championship game berth

== See also ==
- List of college football head coaches with non-consecutive tenure
