= Nevett =

Nevett is a surname. Notable people with the surname include:

- Billy Nevett (1906–1992), English flat racing jockey
- Elijah Nevett (born 1944), American football player
- Lisa Nevett (born 1965), English archaeologist

== See also ==
- Nevitt, given name and surname
