= 1919 Ohio Green and White football team =

American college football season

1919 Ohio Green and White football
- Conference: Ohio Athletic Conference
- Record: 3–5 (2–4 OAC)
- Head coach: Frank Gullum (2nd season)

1919 Ohio Athletic Conference football standings
	Conf.					Overall
Team	W		L		T	W		L		T
Wooster $	7	–	0	–	0	8	–	0	–	0
Oberlin	5	–	0	–	0	7	–	1	–	0
Ohio State	2	–	0	–	0	6	–	1	–	0
Miami (OH)	7	–	1	–	0	7	–	1	–	0
Wittenberg	3	–	0	–	2	6	–	0	–	2
Akron	5	–	1	–	1	6	–	1	–	1
Denison	4	–	2	–	1	6	–	2	–	1
Western Reserve	3	–	3	–	0	5	–	4	–	0
Ohio Wesleyan	3	–	3	–	0	4	–	4	–	0
Case	2	–	4	–	1	3	–	6	–	1
Ohio	2	–	4	–	0	3	–	5	–	0
Cincinnati	1	–	3	–	1	3	–	4	–	1
Mount Union	0	–	5	–	0	1	–	7	–	0
Ohio Northern	0	–	6	–	0	1	–	8	–	0
Baldwin–Wallace	0	–	5	–	0	0	–	8	–	0
Kenyon	0	–	7	–	0	0	–	7	–	0
$ – Conference champion

The 1919 Ohio Green and White football team represented Ohio University as a member of the Ohio Athletic Conference (OAC) during the 1919 college football season. Led by second-year head coach Frank Gullum, the Green and White compiled an overall record of 3–5 with a mark of 2–4 in conference play.

== Schedule ==
Date	Opponent	Site	Result
October 4	Muskingum*	Athens, OH	W 13–6
October 11	at Akron	Buchtel Field; Akron, OH	L 6–10
October 18	Heidelberg*	Athens, OH	L 6–7
October 25	at Kenyon	Gambier, OH	W 19–7
November 1	at Ohio Wesleyan	Delaware, OH	L 0–6
November 8	Baldwin–Wallace	Athens, OH	W 80–0
November 15	at Wittenberg	Springfield, OH	L 7–33
November 22	Denison	Athens, OH	L 16–32
*Non-conference game
