= Watt Hobt =

American football and basketball coach (1893–1963)

Biographical details
- Born: October 1, 1893; Wellston, Ohio, U.S.
- Died: October 2, 1963 (aged 70) near Rutledge, Tennessee, U.S.

Playing career

Football
- 1913–1916: Ohio State
- Position: Halfback

Coaching career (HC unless noted)

Football
- 1917–1918: Wittenberg
- 1919–1920: Toledo
- 1921: Tennessee (line)
- 1922–1923: Tennessee (backfield)
- 1924–1925: Tennessee (freshmen)

Basketball
- 1917–1918: Wittenberg
- 1919–1920: Toledo

Head coaching record
- Overall: 11–9 (football); 9–14 (basketball)

Accomplishments and honors

Championships
- Football; 1 OAC (1918)

Albert Watt Hobt Sr. (October 1, 1893 – October 2, 1963) was an American college football and college basketball coach and physical education professor. He served as the head football coach and head basketball coach at the University of Toledo from 1919 to 1920. Prior to his stint at Toledo, he served as the head basketball coach at Wittenberg College—now known as Wittenberg University—in Springfield, Ohio during the 1917–18 season.

Hobt moved to Knoxville, Tennessee, where he served as a long-time physical education faculty member at the University of Tennessee. He served as an assistant coach for the Tennessee Volunteers football team from 1921 to 1925.

Hobt died on October 2, 1963, after suffering a heart seizure while driving his car near Rutledge, Tennessee.

== Head coaching record ==
=== Football ===
Year	Team	Overall	Conference	Standing	Bowl/playoffs
Wittenberg Tigers (Ohio Athletic Conference) (1917–1918)
1917	Wittenberg	5–2	4–1	T–3rd	
1918	Wittenberg	4–0	3–0	1st	
Wittenberg:		9–2	7–1		
Toledo Blue and Gold (Independent) (1919–1920)
1919	Toledo	2–4			
1920	Toledo	0–3			
Toledo:		2–7			
Total:		11–9			
National championship Conference title Conference division title or championship game berth
