= Frank Gullum =

American sports coach (1885–1965)

Biographical details
- Born: May 18, 1885; Hamden, Ohio, U.S.
- Died: April 19, 1965 (aged 79); Athens, Ohio, U.S.

Playing career

Football
- 1904: Ohio
- Position: Halfback

Coaching career (HC unless noted)

Football
- 1918–1919: Ohio

Basketball
- 1918–1920: Ohio

Baseball
- 1919: Ohio

Head coaching record
- Overall: 7–5–1 (college football); 10–10 (college basketball); 6–1 (college baseball)

Frank Barnhart Gullum (May 18, 1885 – April 19, 1965) was an American college football, basketball, and baseball coach. He served as the head football coach at Ohio University in Athens, Ohio from 1918 to 1919, compiling a record of 7–5–1. He was the head basketball coach at Ohio for two seasons, from 1918 and 1920, amassing a record of 10–10, and the school's head baseball coach in 1919, tallying a mark of 6–1. Gullum was also a professor of chemistry at the Ohio University. Before coming to Ohio University, he coached football at East High School in Columbus, Ohio, where he mentored Chic Harley, who went on to star at Ohio State University. Gullum died on April 19, 1965, at Sheltering Arms Hospital in Athens.

== Head coaching record ==
=== College football ===
Year	Team	Overall	Conference	Standing	Bowl/playoffs
Ohio Green and White (Ohio Athletic Conference) (1918–1919)
1918	Ohio	4–0–1	1–0–1	6th	
1919	Ohio	3–5	2–4	11th	
Ohio:		7–5–1	3–4–1		
Total:		7–5–1			

=== College basketball ===
Record table
Season	Team	Overall	Conference	Standing	Postseason
Ohio Green and White (Independent) (1918–1920)
1918–19	Ohio	5–4			
1919–20	Ohio	5–6			
Ohio:		10–10 (.500)			
Total:		33–7 (.825)			
