= Saul Phillips (basketball) =

American college basketball coach (born 1972)

Biographical details
- Born: October 11, 1972 (age 53); Reedsburg, Wisconsin, U.S.

Playing career
- 1991–1995: Wisconsin–Platteville

Coaching career (HC unless noted)
- 1996–1997: Wayne State (NE) (assistant)
- 1997–1999: Lake Superior State (assistant)
- 1999–2001: Milwaukee (assistant)
- 2004–2007: North Dakota State (assistant)
- 2007–2014: North Dakota State
- 2014–2019: Ohio
- 2019–2025: Northern State

Administrative career (AD unless noted)
- 2001–2004: Wisconsin (DBO)

Head coaching record
- Overall: 316–229 (.578)
- Tournaments: (NCAA DI) 1–2 (NCAA DII) 1–2 (CBI) 2–3

Accomplishments and honors

Championships
- 2 Summit League tournament (2009, 2014); 2 Summit League regular season (2009, 2014); 2 NSIC regular season (2020, 2023); 2 NSIC tournament (2020, 2021); 3 NSIC North Division (2020, 2021, 2023)

Awards
- 2× Summit League Coach of the Year (2009, 2014); NSIC North Division Coach of the Year (2021); NSIC Coach of the Year (2023)

Saul Edward Phillips (born October 10, 1972) is an American college basketball coach. He was most recently the head coach of the Northern State Wolves men's basketball team. Phillips is a graduate of University of Wisconsin–Platteville.

== Coaching career ==
=== North Dakota State University ===
Phillips got his start at NDSU as an assistant coach under Tim Miles in 2004. When Miles left the school to coach Colorado State in 2007, Phillips was promoted to head coach.

In 2009 Phillips led the North Dakota State Bison to win the Summit League tournament championship and became the first team since Southwestern Louisiana (now Louisiana–Lafayette) in 1972 to advance to the NCAA Men's Division I Basketball Championship in their first year of eligibility. On January 17, 2013; Saul Phillips notched his 100th win with the Bison.

Phillips reached the NCAA tournament once again in 2014 after winning the Summit League tournament. Seeded 12th in the NCAA Tournament, the Bison upset 5th seeded Oklahoma in the second round 80–75, then lost to 4th seeded San Diego State 44-63 in the third round. He is currently 4th on the all-time wins list in NDSU men's basketball history.

=== Ohio University ===
On April 6, 2014, Phillips agreed to become the 18th head coach of the Ohio Bobcats. The 2014–15 Bobcats finished with a 10–20 overall record and only 5 wins in the MAC in spite of the presence of future NBA player Maurice Ndour. In 2015–16 the Bobcats went 23–12 and 11–7 MAC Conference record giving them the #2 seed in the 2016 MAC tournament. Junior Antonio Campbell was named the 2016 MAC Player of the Year after averaging a double-double throughout the season. The Bobcats lost to Buffalo in the semifinal game of the MAC Tournament 74–88. Ohio accepted an invitation to the 2016 College Basketball Invitational. They reached the semifinals but lost to Morehead State. His 2016–17 went 20–10 overall and 11–7 in the MAC which was good for second place.

His last two seasons at Ohio were plagued by player injuries and resulted in 14-17 records both seasons. On March 13, 2019, Phillips' contract was not renewed by Ohio after 5 seasons. One of his successes at Ohio turned out to be offering Jason Preston, who was unrecruited out of high school, a scholarship. Preston was later selected in the 2021 NBA draft.

=== Northern State University ===
On June 11, 2019, Phillips was named the head men's basketball coach at Northern State following the departure of Paul Sather. In his first season, the Wolves won the NSIC regular season championship and the NSIC tournament championship. However, the postseason was cancelled due to the COVID-19 pandemic. On February 22, 2025, he was relieved of his duties after posting a 2–26 record (1–21 in NSIC play).

== Head coaching record ==
Record table
Season	Team	Overall	Conference	Standing	Postseason
North Dakota State Bison (The Summit League) (2007–2014)
2007–08	North Dakota State	16–13	10–8	4th	
2008–09	North Dakota State	26–7	16–2	1st	NCAA DI round of 64
2009–10	North Dakota State	11–18	8–10	6th	
2010–11	North Dakota State	14–15	8–10	7th	
2011–12	North Dakota State	17–14	9–9	3rd	CBI first round
2012–13	North Dakota State	24–10	12–4	3rd	CBI first round
2013–14	North Dakota State	26–6	12–2	1st	NCAA DI round of 32
North Dakota State:		134–83 (.615)	75–45 (.625)		
Ohio Bobcats (Mid-American Conference) (2014–2019)
2014–15	Ohio	10–20	5–13	6th (East)	
2015–16	Ohio	23–12	11–7	2nd (East)	CBI semifinals
2016–17	Ohio	20–11	11–7	2nd (East)	
2017–18	Ohio	14–17	7–11	T–4th (East)	
2018–19	Ohio	14–17	6–12	6th (East)	
Ohio:		81–77 (.513)	40–50 (.444)		
Northern State Wolves (NSIC) (2019–2025)
2019–20	Northern State	26–6	18–4	1st	Cancelled due to the COVID-19 pandemic
2020–21	Northern State	19–2	13–1	1st**	2021 NCAA DII Regional Finals
2021–22	Northern State	20–12	13–9	5th	
2022–23	Northern State	24–7	19–3	1st	2023 NCAA DII First Round
2023–24	Northern State	10–19	8–14	T-11th	
2024–25	Northern State	2–26	1–21	15th	
Northern State:		101–72 (.584)	72–52 (.581)		
Total:		316–231 (.578)			
National champion Postseason invitational champion Conference regular season champion Conference regular season and conference tournament champion Division regular season champion Division regular season and conference tournament champion Conference tournament champion

**-During the 2020-21 season, only a North and South Division winner were awarded, no overall conference championship was given due to COVID-19

== House Hunters ==
Season 185, episode 7 of HGTV's show House Hunters featured Saul as he and his wife search for a home in Aberdeen, South Dakota.
