= Garland Nevitt =

American football, basketball, and baseball coach

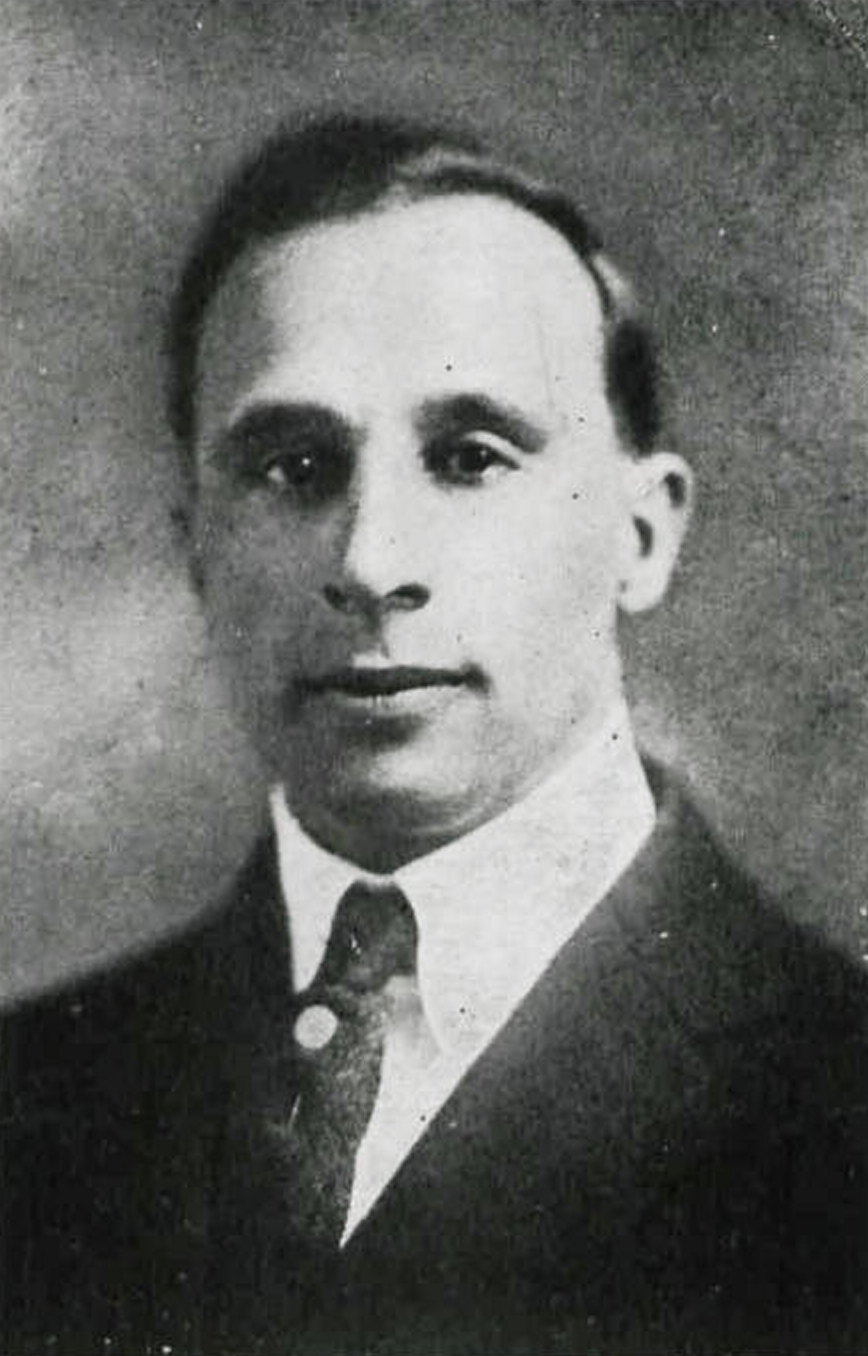
- Nevitt pictured in Chippewa 1920, Central Michigan yearbook

Biographical details
- Born: February 28, 1887; Kansas, U.S.
- Died: August 10, 1970 (aged 83)

Playing career

Baseball
- 1911–1913: Battle Creek Crickets
- 1914–1915: St. Thomas Saints
- Position: Catcher

Coaching career (HC unless noted)

Football
- 1919: Central Michigan

Basketball
- 1919–1921: Central Michigan

Baseball
- 1918–1920: Central Michigan

Head coaching record
- Overall: 2–2–3 (football); 21–10 (basketball); 14–12–1 (baseball)

Garland "Chief" Nevitt (February 28, 1887 – August 10, 1970) was an American football, basketball, and baseball coach, as well as a Minor League Baseball player. He served as the head football coach at Central Michigan University for one season in 1919, compiling a record of 2–2–3. That same year, he coached the basketball team to a 10–5 record, and remained head coach until 1921. Before his coaching days, he was a baseball player, competing with the Battle Creek Crickets of the C/D Southern Michigan League from 1911 to 1913 and with the St. Thomas Saints of the Canadian League from 1914 to 1915. He was also known to be vegetarian and a non-smoker.

== Early life ==
A member of the Delaware tribe who also had African-American heritage, Nevitt was born in on February 28, 1887 in Olathe, Kansas. Coming from Native American descent, with connection to the Lenape, Nevitt was given the nickname "Chief". Garland attended elementary school locally, but went on to attend Carlisle Indian Industrial School in Pennsylvania. While there, he immersed himself into a rigorous athletic regimen. It was there that he started playing and developing a love for basketball, baseball, and American football. During his time at Carlisle, he played football with his notable classmate and future Olympian, Jim Thorpe. At this time he discovered his passion and talent in being a baseball catcher.

The nickname, Chief, tended to be put in front of most American Indian, or Native American sports players early on. Despite many popular sports descending from American Indian culture and tradition, white Americans tend to get to take credit for the sales and popularity. Garland Nevitt certainly left his long-lasting mark on many different sports and the athletic growth of many players.

== Athletic career ==
After his time at Carlisle, Garland Nevitt moved to Michigan, where he was given the chance to play minor league baseball in the C/D Southern Michigan Independent League. He played minor league baseball from 1911 to 1915.

His first years, 1911 to 1913, was spent playing with the Battle Creek Crickets as their starting catcher. He played 338 games, had 1229 at bat appearances, and a .963 fielding percentage average.

Then in 1914, Garland Nevitt switched over to play with the St. Thomas Saints, also playing as their catcher. He played 95 games, 327 at bat appearances, and contributed to 28 runs that season.

== College Coaching Career ==
From 1918 to 1920 he was the head baseball coach at Central Michigan University.

He then become the head basketball coach in 1919, continuing to coach until 1921. In 1919 he led the team to a 10-5 season record. He moved to assistant coach for the next season contributing to a 11-5 record.

Also in 1919, Nevitt accepted the head coaching position for the football team. In one season he assisted in the Chippewas completed a 2-2-3 season. Despite the wartime disruptions, the team was able to rally and redevelop a competitive playing environment.

=== College Football Record ===
Year	Team	Overall	Conference	Standing	Bowl/playoffs
Central Michigan Normalites (Independent) (1919)
1919	Central Michigan	2–2–3			
Central Michigan:		2–2–3			
Total:		2–2–3			

== Other Coaching Positions ==
Following his time working at Central Michigan University, Garland Nevitt decided to pick up a head football coaching position at Bay City Central High School in 1922 and continuing until 1934. What made this position so special, was the fact that this was the schools first season with a football team. Throughout his 13 seasons, Nevitt supported his players and compiled a record of 78-30-12, a state title win in 1924, and 4 Saginaw Valley Conference titles.

After his coaching success in football, Nevitt went on to coach the basketball team from 1923 to 1935. Over these 13 seasons, he built a 119-88 record with the help of his players and fellow coaching staff.
