= Tip O'Neill (American football) =

American football player (1898–1984)

Profile
- Position: Wingback

Personal information
- Born: October 24, 1898; Sault Ste. Marie, Michigan, U.S.
- Died: December 6, 1984 (aged 86); Palm Beach, Florida, U.S.
- Listed height: 5 ft 10 in (1.78 m)
- Listed weight: 170 lb (77 kg)

Career information
- College: St. Norbert, Detroit

Career history
- Dayton Triangles (1922)

Career NFL statistics
- Touchdowns: 1
- Stats at Pro Football Reference

Gerald Raphael 'Tip' O'Neill; (October 24, 1898 – December 6, 1984) was a player in the National Football League (NFL). He played for the Dayton Triangles. He died in 1984.
