= 1919 University of Akron football team =

American college football season

1919 Akron football
- Conference: Ohio Athletic Conference
- Record: 6–1–1 (5–1–1 OAC)
- Head coach: Fred Sefton (5th season)
- Captain: Art Haley
- Home stadium: Buchtel Field

1919 Ohio Athletic Conference football standings
	Conf.					Overall
Team	W		L		T	W		L		T
Wooster $	7	–	0	–	0	8	–	0	–	0
Oberlin	5	–	0	–	0	7	–	1	–	0
Ohio State	2	–	0	–	0	6	–	1	–	0
Miami (OH)	7	–	1	–	0	7	–	1	–	0
Wittenberg	3	–	0	–	2	6	–	0	–	2
Akron	5	–	1	–	1	6	–	1	–	1
Denison	4	–	2	–	1	6	–	2	–	1
Western Reserve	3	–	3	–	0	5	–	4	–	0
Ohio Wesleyan	3	–	3	–	0	4	–	4	–	0
Case	2	–	4	–	1	3	–	6	–	1
Ohio	2	–	4	–	0	3	–	5	–	0
Cincinnati	1	–	3	–	1	3	–	4	–	1
Mount Union	0	–	5	–	0	1	–	7	–	0
Ohio Northern	0	–	6	–	0	1	–	8	–	0
Baldwin–Wallace	0	–	5	–	0	0	–	8	–	0
Kenyon	0	–	7	–	0	0	–	7	–	0
$ – Conference champion

The 1919 Akron football team represented the University of Akron in the 1919 college football season. The team was led by fifth-year head coach Fred Sefton. Akron outscored their opponents by a total of 139–38.

The season was the program's most successful one since the 7–2 1910 season, when they were known as Buchtel College.

== Schedule ==
Date	Opponent	Site	Result	Source
September 27	Hiram*	Buchtel Field; Akron, OH	W 27–0	
October 4	at Baldwin–Wallace	Berea, OH	W 33–0	
October 11	Ohio	Buchtel Field; Akron, OH	W 10–6	
October 18	Ohio Northern	Buchtel Field; Akron, OH	W 24–0	
November 1	Mount Union	Buchtel Field; Akron, OH	W 22–0	
November 8	at Wooster	Wooster, OH	L 0–19	
November 15	Western Reserve	Buchtel Field; Akron, OH	W 17–7	
November 22	Case	Buchtel Field; Akron, OH	T 6–6	
*Non-conference game
