= 1919 Lincoln Tigers football team =

American college football season

1919 Lincoln Tigers football

Western black schools champion
- Conference: Western region/conference
- Record: 3–0 (3–0 Western region/conference)
- Head coach: S. L. Burlong (2nd season)

1919 Missouri Valley Conference for Black Schools/ Western Black Schools region/conference football standings
	Conf.					Overall
Team	W		L		T	W		L		T
Lincoln (MO) $	3	–	0	–	0	3	–	0	–	0
Columbia Athletics	0	–	0	–	0	1	–	0	–	0
Sumner	0	–	1	–	0	0	–	1	–	0
Lincoln (KC)	0	–	1	–	0	0	–	1	–	0
East St. Louis	0	–	1	–	0	0	–	1	–	0
Western University			–			0	–	0	–	0
George R. Smith			–			0	–	0	–	0
Topeka Industrial Institute			–			0	–	0	–	0
$ – Conference champion

The 1919 Lincoln Tigers football team represented Lincoln Institute—now known as Lincoln University—in Jefferson City, Missouri as Missouri Valley Conference for Black Schools during the 1919 college football season. The region or conference was called Western during this season. The Tigers played compiled a record of 3–0, and were recognized as the state champion among black schools, as well as the Western champions.

== Schedule ==
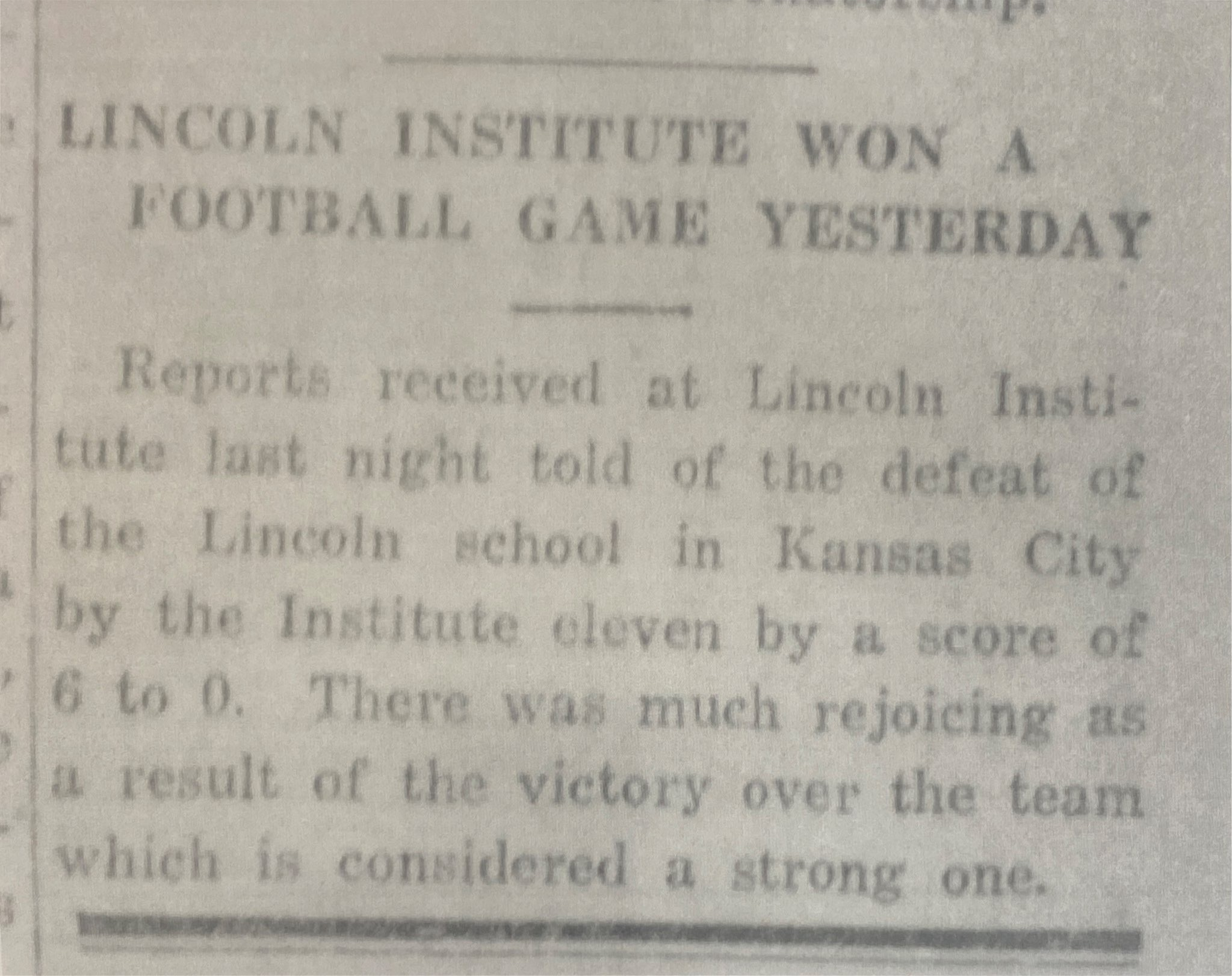
Lincoln Institute defeats Lincoln High School of Kansas City, 6–0

Date	Time	Opponent	Site	Result	Attendance	Source
October 18		East Saint Louis College / High School	Institute grounds; Jefferson City, MO	W 13–3		
October 31		Lincoln High School		W 6–0		
November 27	2:30 p.m.	at Sumner High School	Cardinal Field; St. Louis, MO	W 16–0	3,000	
All times are in Central time
