= 1920 Lincoln Tigers football team =

American college football season

1920 Lincoln Tigers football
- Conference: Independent
- Record: 4–0–1 (9 scheduled)
- Head coach: William B. Jason (1st season)
- Captain: Brooks

1920 Midwestern college football independents records
	Conf.			Overall
Team	W	L	T	W		L		T
Notre Dame		–		9	–	0	–	0
Michigan Mines		–		2	–	0	–	0
Butler		–		7	–	1	–	0
St. Xavier		–		7	–	1	–	0
Detroit		–		8	–	2	–	0
Marquette		–		7	–	2	–	0
Haskell		–		7	–	2	–	1
St. Ignatius (OH)		–		4	–	2	–	0
Iowa State Teachers		–		4	–	2	–	1
South Dakota State		–		4	–	2	–	1
Indiana State		–		3	–	2	–	0
Valparaiso		–		5	–	3	–	0
Nebraska		–		5	–	3	–	1
Central Michigan		–		4	–	3	–	1
Akron		–		4	–	4	–	0
Wabash		–		3	–	4	–	0
Western State Normal		–		3	–	4	–	0
North Dakota Agricultural		–		2	–	3	–	1
Michigan Agricultural		–		4	–	6	–	0
Earlham		–		2	–	3	–	0
Northern Illinois State		–		3	–	5	–	0
Dayton		–		2	–	4	–	0
Kent State		–		1	–	2	–	0
Saint Louis		–		3	–	6	–	0
Bowling Green		–		1	–	4	–	0
Toledo		–		0	–	3	–	0

The 1920 Lincoln Tigers football team represented Lincoln Institute—now known as Lincoln University—in Jefferson City, Missouri as an independent during the 1920 college football season. The Lincoln Institute Tigers were coached by William B. Jason in his first season as a head coach. Jason was a Lincoln alumnus and a veteran of World War I. The team was captained by Brooks. Nine games were scheduled this season, however, complete statistics for only five games survive. In those five games, the Tigers did not lose a game and outscored their opponents 86 to 29.

== Schedule ==
Date	Time	Opponent	Site	Result	Attendance	Source
October 15	3:30 p.m.	East St. Louis Lincoln High School	Lincoln Institute campus; Jefferson City, MO	T 14–14		
October 22		Western University (KS)	Lincoln Institute campus; Jefferson City, MO			
October 27		at Lincoln High School (KC)	Kansas City, MO	W 21–0		
October 29		at Y.M.C.A (KC)	Kansas City, MO			
October or November		St. Joseph				
November 6		Jefferson City team	Lincoln Institute campus; Jefferson City, MO			
November 12 or 25		George R. Smith	Lincoln Institute campus; Jefferson City, MO	W 24–0		
November or December		Western College (MO)		W 14–9		
December 4		Topeka Industrial Institute	Ruwart's Park; Jefferson City, MO	W 13–6	600	
All times are in Central time

== Roster ==
Name	Position
Brooks	Captain - T
Pearley	Captain - Former Captain - RB/QB
"Wild" West	C
Johnson	C
"Fat" Martin	OL
Wilson	G
Hamilton	G
Doug / Douglass	T
Aitch	T
Kelley	T
Goins	End
R. E. "Bud" Rankens	End
Flemming	End
Robertson	End
Pride	RB
Franklin	RB
Jenkins	RB/QB
Gantt	RB/QB
Billy Smith	QB/RB
Franklin	QB
