= 1920 Notre Dame Fighting Irish football team =

American college football season

1920 Notre Dame Fighting Irish football
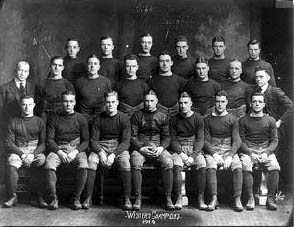

National champion (Billingsley) Co-national champion (Davis)
- Conference: Independent
- Record: 9–0
- Head coach: Knute Rockne (3rd season)
- Offensive scheme: Single-wing
- Base defense: 7–2–2
- Captain: Frank Coughlin
- Home stadium: Cartier Field

Uniform
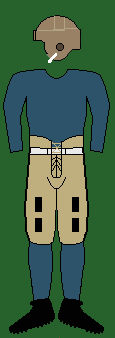

1920 Midwestern college football independents records
	Conf.			Overall
Team	W	L	T	W		L		T
Notre Dame		–		9	–	0	–	0
Michigan Mines		–		2	–	0	–	0
Butler		–		7	–	1	–	0
St. Xavier		–		7	–	1	–	0
Detroit		–		8	–	2	–	0
Marquette		–		7	–	2	–	0
Haskell		–		7	–	2	–	1
St. Ignatius (OH)		–		4	–	2	–	0
Iowa State Teachers		–		4	–	2	–	1
South Dakota State		–		4	–	2	–	1
Indiana State		–		3	–	2	–	0
Valparaiso		–		5	–	3	–	0
Nebraska		–		5	–	3	–	1
Central Michigan		–		4	–	3	–	1
Akron		–		4	–	4	–	0
Wabash		–		3	–	4	–	0
Western State Normal		–		3	–	4	–	0
North Dakota Agricultural		–		2	–	3	–	1
Michigan Agricultural		–		4	–	6	–	0
Earlham		–		2	–	3	–	0
Northern Illinois State		–		3	–	5	–	0
Dayton		–		2	–	4	–	0
Kent State		–		1	–	2	–	0
Saint Louis		–		3	–	6	–	0
Bowling Green		–		1	–	4	–	0
Toledo		–		0	–	3	–	0

The 1920 Notre Dame Fighting Irish football team was an American football team that represented the University of Notre Dame as an independent during the 1920 college football season. In their third year under head coach Knute Rockne, the team compiled a 9–0 record and outscored opponents by a total of 250 or 251 to 44. It was Notre Dame's second consecutive perfect season as the 1919 team also compiled an undefeated and untied record.

There was no contemporaneous system in 1920 for determining a national champion. However, Notre Dame was retroactively named as the national champion by the Billingsley Report and as a co-national champion by Parke H. Davis.

Senior halfback George Gipp was a consensus pick on the 1920 All-America college football team. He died on December 14, 1920, due to a streptococcal throat infection and pneumonia. Other Notre Dame players who received 1920 All-America honors included: ends Eddie Anderson (first-team from United Press) and Roger Kiley (first-team from International News Service); and tackle Frank Coughlin (second-team from International News Service and Walter Eckersall).

The team played its home games at Cartier Field in Notre Dame, Indiana.

== Schedule ==
Date	Time	Opponent	Site	Result	Attendance	Source
October 2		Kalamazoo	Cartier Field; Notre Dame, IN	W 39–0	5,000	
October 9	2:15 p.m.	Western State Normal	Cartier Field; Notre Dame, IN	W 41–0 or 42–0	3,500	
October 16		at Nebraska	Nebraska Field; Lincoln, NE (rivalry)	W 16–7	8,000–10,000	
October 23		Valparaiso	Cartier Field; Notre Dame, IN	W 28–3	8,000–10,000	
October 30		at Army	The Plain; West Point, NY (rivalry)	W 27–17	10,000	
November 6		Purdue	Cartier Field; Notre Dame, IN (rivalry)	W 28–0	12,210	
November 13		vs. Indiana	Washington Park; Indianapolis, IN	W 13–10	14,000	
November 20		at Northwestern	Northwestern Field; Evanston, IL (rivalry)	W 33–7	20,000	
November 25		at Michigan Agricultural	Old College Field; East Lansing, MI (rivalry)	W 25–0	8,000	
All times are in Central time; Source:

== Personnel ==
=== Players ===
- Eddie Anderson, end
- Hunk Anderson
- Norman Barry
- Joe Brandy, quarterback
- Glen Carberry
- Paul Castner
- Fod Cotton
- Danny Coughlin, halfback
- Frank Coughlin, captain and tackle
- Edward DeGree
- James Dooley
- Art Garvey
- George Gipp, halfback
- Chet Grant
- Daniel Grant
- Dave Hayes, end
- Cy Kasper
- Roger Kiley, end
- Fred Larson
- Harry Mehre
- John Mohardt, halfback
- Eugene Oberst
- Bob Phelan
- Si Seyfrit
- Buck Shaw
- Maurice J. "Clipper" Smith, guard
- Frank Thomas
- William Voss
- Earl Walsh
- Chet A. Wynne, fullback

=== Coaching staff ===
- Knute Rockne, head coach
- Walter Halas, assistant coach
- Maurice Starrett, student manager
