= 1920 Nebraska Cornhuskers football team =

American college football season

1920 Nebraska Cornhuskers football
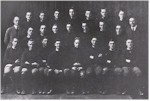
- Conference: Independent
- Record: 5–3–1
- Head coach: Henry Schulte (2nd season)
- Home stadium: Nebraska Field

1920 Midwestern college football independents records
	Conf.			Overall
Team	W	L	T	W		L		T
Notre Dame		–		9	–	0	–	0
Michigan Mines		–		2	–	0	–	0
Butler		–		7	–	1	–	0
St. Xavier		–		7	–	1	–	0
Detroit		–		8	–	2	–	0
Marquette		–		7	–	2	–	0
Haskell		–		7	–	2	–	1
St. Ignatius (OH)		–		4	–	2	–	0
Iowa State Teachers		–		4	–	2	–	1
South Dakota State		–		4	–	2	–	1
Indiana State		–		3	–	2	–	0
Valparaiso		–		5	–	3	–	0
Nebraska		–		5	–	3	–	1
Central Michigan		–		4	–	3	–	1
Akron		–		4	–	4	–	0
Wabash		–		3	–	4	–	0
Western State Normal		–		3	–	4	–	0
North Dakota Agricultural		–		2	–	3	–	1
Michigan Agricultural		–		4	–	6	–	0
Earlham		–		2	–	3	–	0
Northern Illinois State		–		3	–	5	–	0
Dayton		–		2	–	4	–	0
Kent State		–		1	–	2	–	0
Saint Louis		–		3	–	6	–	0
Bowling Green		–		1	–	4	–	0
Toledo		–		0	–	3	–	0

The 1920 Nebraska Cornhuskers football team represented the University of Nebraska in the 1920 college football season. The team was coached by second-year head coach Henry Schulte and played its home games at Nebraska Field in Lincoln, Nebraska. The team competed as an independent. Schulte departed shortly after the end of the season, though he remained at the school to coach track until 1939.

== Schedule ==
Date	Time	Opponent	Site	Result	Attendance	Source
October 2	2:30 p.m.	Washburn	Nebraska Field; Lincoln, NE	W 14–0		
October 9	2:30 p.m.	Colorado Agricultural	Nebraska Field; Lincoln, NE	W 7–0		
October 16	2:30 p.m.	Notre Dame^{†}	Nebraska Field; Lincoln, NE (rivalry)	L 7–16	8,000–10,000	
October 23	2:30 p.m.	South Dakota	Nebraska Field; Lincoln, NE	W 20–0		
November 2	1:30 p.m.	vs. Rutgers	Polo Grounds; New York, NY	W 28–0	15,000	
November 6	1:30 p.m.	at Penn State	New Beaver Field; State College, PA	L 0–20	9,000	
November 13	2:30 p.m.	at Kansas	McCook Field; Lawrence, KS (rivalry)	T 20–20		
November 20	2:30 p.m.	Michigan Agricultural	Nebraska Field; Lincoln, NE	W 35–7		
November 25	2:30 p.m.	Washington State	Nebraska Field; Lincoln, NE	L 20–21	10,000	
^{†}Homecoming; All times are in Central time

== Coaching staff ==
Coach	Position	First year	Alma mater
Henry Schulte	Head coach	1919	Michigan
Paul J. Schissler	Assistant coach	1918	
Jack Best	Trainer	1890	Nebraska

== Roster ==
Bassett, Henry (So.) T Dale, Fred FB; Dana, Herbert (Jr.) E Day, William (Sr.) C Hartley, Harold (So.) FB; Henry, Stanley HB; Howarth, Harry (Jr.) QB; Hoy, George (So.) HB; Kellogg, Sam T Moore, Vern (So.) H Munn, Monte (Jr.) G Munn, Wade (Jr.) G Newman, Richard (Jr.) Q Pucelik, John (Jr.) G Russell, Robert QB	Schellenberg, Elmer HB; Scherer, Leo (So.) E Schissler PLAYER; Schoeppel, Andrew (Jr.) E Schulte PLAYER; Swanson, Clarence (Jr.) E Thomsen, Fred (So.) E Tripplett, Richard (So.) E Weller, Raymond (So.) T Wenke, Adolph (So.) G Wilder, Harold T Wright, Floyd (Jr.) HB; Young, Farley (Sr.) G

== Game summaries ==
=== Washburn ===
Washburn at Nebraska

Team	1	2	Total
Washburn			0
• Nebraska			14

- Date: October 2
- Location: Nebraska Field, Lincoln, NE
- Game start: 2:30 CST

Nebraska rested many key players in its season-opening shutout of Washburn, the final meeting between the teams.

=== Colorado Agricultural ===
Colorado Agricultural at Nebraska

Team	1	2	Total
Colorado Agricultural			4
• Nebraska			7

- Date: October 9
- Location: Nebraska Field, Lincoln, NE
- Game start: 2:30 CST

Nebraska edged out Colorado Agricultural (now Colorado State University) in the first meeting between the teams.

=== Notre Dame ===
Notre Dame at Nebraska

Team	1	2	3	4	Total
• Notre Dame	2	7	0	7	16
Nebraska	7	0	0	0	7

- Date: October 16
- Location: Nebraska Field, Lincoln, NE
- Game start: 2:30 CST
- Game attendance: 10,000

Nebraska took a lead into the second quarter but did not score again. Notre Dame and head coach Knute Rockne controlled time of possession in the second half through a series of low-risk, lengthy drives. The Irish pulled ahead to win largely due to the efforts of George Gipp, who rushed for 218 yards despite Notre Dame netting only 174 yards.

=== South Dakota ===
South Dakota at Nebraska

Team	1	2	Total
South Dakota			0
• Nebraska			20

- Date: October 23
- Location: Nebraska Field, Lincoln, NE
- Game start: 2:30 CST

=== Rutgers ===
Nebraska vs. Rutgers

Team	1	2	3	4	Total
• Nebraska	0	14	0	14	28
Rutgers	0	0	0	0	0

- Date: November 2
- Location: Polo Grounds, New York, NY
- Game start: 1:30 CST
- Game attendance: 15,000
- Referee: Nat A. Tufts

Nebraska dominated Rutgers in what was NU's farthest-ever trip east. This was the only meeting between the schools until Rutgers joined the Big Ten in 2014.

=== At Penn State ===
Nebraska at Penn State

Team	1	2	3	4	Total
Nebraska	0	0	0	0	0
• Penn State	0	7	0	13	20

- Date: November 6
- Location: Beaver Field, State College, PA
- Game start: 1:30 CST
- Game attendance: 9,000
- Referee: Michigan Hadden

=== At Kansas ===
Nebraska at Kansas

Team	1	2	Total
Nebraska			20
Kansas			20

- Date: November 13
- Location: McCook Field, Lawrence, KS
- Game start: 2:30 CST

NU led 20–0 at halftime, but Kansas responded with twenty unanswered points in the second half and the game ended in a draw.

=== MAC ===
MAC at Nebraska

Team	1	2	Total
MAC			7
• Nebraska			35

- Date: November 20
- Location: Nebraska Field, Lincoln, NE
- Game start: 2:30 CST

=== Washington State ===
Washington State at Nebraska

Team	1	2	Total
• Washington State			21
Nebraska			20

- Date: November 25
- Location: Nebraska Field, Lincoln, NE
- Game start: 2:30 CST

Nebraska blew a twenty-point halftime lead for the second time in 1920, losing to Washington State 21–20. This was the first meeting between Nebraska and Washington State.
