= 1920 Marquette Hilltoppers football team =

American college football season

1920 Marquette Hilltoppers football
- Conference: Independent
- Record: 7–2
- Head coach: John J. Ryan (4th season)

1920 Midwestern college football independents records
| | Conf. | | | Overall |
| Team | W | L | T | W | | L | | T |
|---|---|---|---|---|---|---|---|---|
| Notre Dame | | – | | 9 | – | 0 | – | 0 |
| Michigan Mines | | – | | 2 | – | 0 | – | 0 |
| Butler | | – | | 7 | – | 1 | – | 0 |
| St. Xavier | | – | | 7 | – | 1 | – | 0 |
| Detroit | | – | | 8 | – | 2 | – | 0 |
| Marquette | | – | | 7 | – | 2 | – | 0 |
| Haskell | | – | | 7 | – | 2 | – | 1 |
| St. Ignatius (OH) | | – | | 4 | – | 2 | – | 0 |
| Iowa State Teachers | | – | | 4 | – | 2 | – | 1 |
| South Dakota State | | – | | 4 | – | 2 | – | 1 |
| Indiana State | | – | | 3 | – | 2 | – | 0 |
| Valparaiso | | – | | 5 | – | 3 | – | 0 |
| Nebraska | | – | | 5 | – | 3 | – | 1 |
| Central Michigan | | – | | 4 | – | 3 | – | 1 |
| Akron | | – | | 4 | – | 4 | – | 0 |
| Wabash | | – | | 3 | – | 4 | – | 0 |
| Western State Normal | | – | | 3 | – | 4 | – | 0 |
| North Dakota Agricultural | | – | | 2 | – | 3 | – | 1 |
| Michigan Agricultural | | – | | 4 | – | 6 | – | 0 |
| Earlham | | – | | 2 | – | 3 | – | 0 |
| Northern Illinois State | | – | | 3 | – | 5 | – | 0 |
| Dayton | | – | | 2 | – | 4 | – | 0 |
| Kent State | | – | | 1 | – | 2 | – | 0 |
| Saint Louis | | – | | 3 | – | 6 | – | 0 |
| Bowling Green | | – | | 1 | – | 4 | – | 0 |
| Toledo | | – | | 0 | – | 3 | – | 0 |

The 1920 Marquette Hilltoppers football team was an American football team that represented Marquette University as an independent during the 1920 college football season. In its fourth season under head coach John J. Ryan, the team compiled a 7–2 record.

== Schedule ==
| Date | Opponent | Site | Result | Attendance | Source |
|---|---|---|---|---|---|
| October 2 | Carroll (WI) | Milwaukee, WI | W 31–0 | | |
| October 9 | at Detroit | Detroit, MI | L 14–21 | | |
| October 16 | Ripon | Milwaukee, WI | W 23–9 | | |
| October 23 | Western State Normal | Milwaukee, WI | W 46–7 | | |
| October 30 | at Creighton | Omaha, NE | W 13–0 | | |
| November 6 | Haskell | Milwaukee, WI | L 3–6 | 16,000 | |
| November 13 | at Saint Louis | Sportsman's Park; St. Louis, MO | W 49–14 | | |
| November 22 | North Dakota | Milwaukee, WI | W 10–0 | | |
| November 25 | at Wabash | Crawfordsville, IN | W 21–7 | | |
