= Alvin Loucks =

American football player and coach (1895–1973)

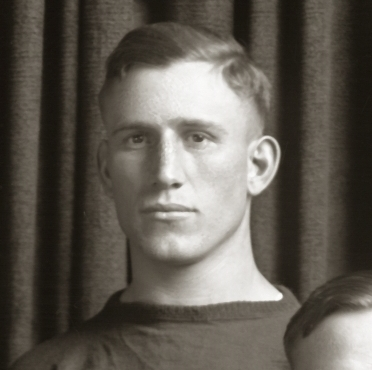
- Loucks cropped from 1919 Michigan football team photograph

No. 1
- Position: Guard

Personal information
- Born: June 15, 1895; Grand Rapids, Michigan, U.S.
- Died: April 18, 1973 (aged 77); Hopkins, Minnesota, U.S.
- Listed weight: 170 lb (77 kg)

Career information
- High school: Union (Grand Rapids, Michigan)
- College: Michigan (1916, 1919)

Career history

Playing
- Detroit Heralds (1920)

Coaching
- Escanaba HS (MI) (1921–1922) Head coach; Duluth (1927–1940) Head coach; Central HS (MN) (1941–?) Head coach

Career statistics
- Games played: 1

Alvin Earl Loucks (June 15, 1895 – April 18, 1973) was an American football player and coach. He played college football at the University of Michigan (1916, 1919) and professionally football for the Detroit Heralds (1920).Loucks served as the football coach at Duluth Junior College from 1927 to 1940.

== Michigan ==
Loucks was a native of Grand Rapids, Michigan and the son of James C. Loucks. He attended Union High School in Grand Rapids before enrolling at the University of Michigan. He played guard for the Michigan Wolverines football team in 1916 and 1919.

== Detroit Heralds ==
After leaving the University of Michigan, Loucks played professional football for the Detroit Heralds in 1920. In 1920, the Heralds played in the inaugural season of the American Professional Football Association (APFA)—renamed the National Football League (NFL) in 1922. The 1920 Heralds compiled a 1–3 record, while inclement weather eliminated their November schedule. The cancellations were financially devastating, and the team folded.

== Escanaba ==
In 1921, after a brief stint as a teacher in Pontiac, Michigan, Loucks was hired as the physical education director for the public schools in Escanaba, Michigan. He also served as the head football coach at Escanaba, where his 1922 football team won the football championship of the Upper Peninsula.

== Duluth ==
In 1927, Loucks moved to Duluth, Minnesota, where he became one of the original faculty members at the Duluth Junior College. Loucks was assigned to serve as a physical education instructor and to organize and coach every athletic team at the new college, including football, basketball and wrestling. He was described by students as "rough, gruff and rawboned", but having a "heart of gold." In the first year, Loucks' team lost every game, but in 1928 his team compiled an undefeated record and won the conference championship with victories over teams from Minnesota, Wisconsin and Michigan (including the Michigan School of Mines).

In 1940, the football team was short of players. Only 18 players reported, with only six lettermen returning from the prior year. In November 1940, the student body voted to abolish intercollegiate football and replace it in 1941 with six-man intramural football.

In 1941, Loucks became employed as the head football coach at Duluth's Central High School, where he remained until his retirement in 1963.

== Family and later years ==
Loucks was married to Evelyn Loucks (born c. 1901), and they had two daughters, Joan Loucks (born c. 1926) and Sally Loucks (born c. 1931). Loucks lived in Hopkins, Minnesota in his later years. He died in 1973 at age 75.
