= 1920 Bowling Green Normals football team =

American college football season

1920 Bowling Green Normals football
- Conference: Independent
- Record: 1–4
- Head coach: Walt Jean (1st season)
- Captain: Charles Clucas

1920 Midwestern college football independents records
	Conf.			Overall
Team	W	L	T	W		L		T
Notre Dame		–		9	–	0	–	0
Michigan Mines		–		2	–	0	–	0
Butler		–		7	–	1	–	0
St. Xavier		–		7	–	1	–	0
Detroit		–		8	–	2	–	0
Marquette		–		7	–	2	–	0
Haskell		–		7	–	2	–	1
St. Ignatius (OH)		–		4	–	2	–	0
Iowa State Teachers		–		4	–	2	–	1
South Dakota State		–		4	–	2	–	1
Indiana State		–		3	–	2	–	0
Valparaiso		–		5	–	3	–	0
Nebraska		–		5	–	3	–	1
Central Michigan		–		4	–	3	–	1
Akron		–		4	–	4	–	0
Wabash		–		3	–	4	–	0
Western State Normal		–		3	–	4	–	0
North Dakota Agricultural		–		2	–	3	–	1
Michigan Agricultural		–		4	–	6	–	0
Earlham		–		2	–	3	–	0
Northern Illinois State		–		3	–	5	–	0
Dayton		–		2	–	4	–	0
Kent State		–		1	–	2	–	0
Saint Louis		–		3	–	6	–	0
Bowling Green		–		1	–	4	–	0
Toledo		–		0	–	3	–	0

The 1920 Bowling Green Normals football team was an American football team that represented Bowling Green State Normal School (later Bowling Green State University) as an independent during the 1920 college football season. In its second season of intercollegiate football, Bowling Green compiled a 1–4 record and was outscored by a total of 138 to 41. Walt Jean was the coach, and Charles Clucas was the team captain.

== Schedule ==
Date	Opponent	Site	Result	Attendance	Source
October 5	at Findlay	Findlay, OH	L 6–10		
October 12	at Michigan State Normal	Ypsilanti, MI	L 0–68		
October 16	Heidelberg	Bowling Green, OH	L 0–14		
October 23	Defiance	Bowling Green, OH	L 28–46		
November 6	at Kent State	Kent, OH (rivalry)	W 7–0		
