= 1920 Northern Illinois State Normal football team =

American college football season

1920 Northern Illinois State Normal football
- Conference: Independent
- Record: 3–5
- Head coach: Paul Harrison (1st season)
- Captain: Crawford King
- Home stadium: Glidden Field

1920 Midwestern college football independents records
	Conf.			Overall
Team	W	L	T	W		L		T
Notre Dame		–		9	–	0	–	0
Michigan Mines		–		2	–	0	–	0
Butler		–		7	–	1	–	0
St. Xavier		–		7	–	1	–	0
Detroit		–		8	–	2	–	0
Marquette		–		7	–	2	–	0
Haskell		–		7	–	2	–	1
St. Ignatius (OH)		–		4	–	2	–	0
Iowa State Teachers		–		4	–	2	–	1
South Dakota State		–		4	–	2	–	1
Indiana State		–		3	–	2	–	0
Valparaiso		–		5	–	3	–	0
Nebraska		–		5	–	3	–	1
Central Michigan		–		4	–	3	–	1
Akron		–		4	–	4	–	0
Wabash		–		3	–	4	–	0
Western State Normal		–		3	–	4	–	0
North Dakota Agricultural		–		2	–	3	–	1
Michigan Agricultural		–		4	–	6	–	0
Earlham		–		2	–	3	–	0
Northern Illinois State		–		3	–	5	–	0
Dayton		–		2	–	4	–	0
Kent State		–		1	–	2	–	0
Saint Louis		–		3	–	6	–	0
Bowling Green		–		1	–	4	–	0
Toledo		–		0	–	3	–	0

The 1920 Northern Illinois State Normal football team represented Northern Illinois State Normal College as an independent in the 1920 college football season. They were led by first-year head coach Paul Harrison and played their home games at Glidden Field, located on the east end of campus. The team finished the season with a 3–5 record. Crawford King was the team's captain.

== Schedule ==
Date	Opponent	Site	Result	Source
September 29	DeKalb High School	Glidden Field; DeKalb, IL	W 7–0	
October 2	Wheaton (IL)	Glidden Field; DeKalb, IL	L 14–16	
October 9	North-Western College	Glidden Field; DeKalb, IL	L 7–13	
October 16	Mount Morris	Glidden Field; DeKalb, IL	W 64–0	
October 23	at Mount Morris	Mount Morris, IL	W 12–0	
October 30	Cornell (IA)	Glidden Field; DeKalb, Illinois	L 0–3	
November 6	at Wheaton (IL)	Wheaton, IL	L 7–16	
November 11	St. Viator	Glidden Field; DeKalb, IL	L 13–32	
