= 1920 Detroit Titans football team =

American college football season

1920 Detroit Titans football
- Conference: Independent
- Record: 8–2
- Head coach: James F. Duffy (3rd season)
- Home stadium: Navin Field

1920 Midwestern college football independents records
| | Conf. | | | Overall |
| Team | W | L | T | W | | L | | T |
|---|---|---|---|---|---|---|---|---|
| Notre Dame | | – | | 9 | – | 0 | – | 0 |
| Michigan Mines | | – | | 2 | – | 0 | – | 0 |
| Butler | | – | | 7 | – | 1 | – | 0 |
| St. Xavier | | – | | 7 | – | 1 | – | 0 |
| Detroit | | – | | 8 | – | 2 | – | 0 |
| Marquette | | – | | 7 | – | 2 | – | 0 |
| Haskell | | – | | 7 | – | 2 | – | 1 |
| St. Ignatius (OH) | | – | | 4 | – | 2 | – | 0 |
| Iowa State Teachers | | – | | 4 | – | 2 | – | 1 |
| South Dakota State | | – | | 4 | – | 2 | – | 1 |
| Indiana State | | – | | 3 | – | 2 | – | 0 |
| Valparaiso | | – | | 5 | – | 3 | – | 0 |
| Nebraska | | – | | 5 | – | 3 | – | 1 |
| Central Michigan | | – | | 4 | – | 3 | – | 1 |
| Akron | | – | | 4 | – | 4 | – | 0 |
| Wabash | | – | | 3 | – | 4 | – | 0 |
| Western State Normal | | – | | 3 | – | 4 | – | 0 |
| North Dakota Agricultural | | – | | 2 | – | 3 | – | 1 |
| Michigan Agricultural | | – | | 4 | – | 6 | – | 0 |
| Earlham | | – | | 2 | – | 3 | – | 0 |
| Northern Illinois State | | – | | 3 | – | 5 | – | 0 |
| Dayton | | – | | 2 | – | 4 | – | 0 |
| Kent State | | – | | 1 | – | 2 | – | 0 |
| Saint Louis | | – | | 3 | – | 6 | – | 0 |
| Bowling Green | | – | | 1 | – | 4 | – | 0 |
| Toledo | | – | | 0 | – | 3 | – | 0 |

The 1920 Detroit Titans football team represented the University of Detroit as an independent during the 1920 college football season. Detroit shut out six of ten opponents, outscored all opponents by a combined total of 279 to 32, and finished with an 8–2 record in their third year under head coach James F. Duffy.

Two Detroit players, Tillie Voss and Dutch Lauer, went on to play in the National Football League. End Frank Kane was the team captain.

== Schedule ==
| Date | Opponent | Site | Result | Source |
|---|---|---|---|---|
| October 2 | Duquesne | Mack Park; Detroit, MI | W 34–0 | |
| October 9 | Marquette | Detroit, MI | W 21–14 | |
| October 16 | Saint Louis | Navin Field; Detroit, MI | W 48–0 | |
| October 23 | at Bethany (WV) | Wheeling, WV | L 6–9 | |
| October 30 | Fordham | Navin Field; Detroit, MI | W 39–0 | |
| November 6 | Tufts | Detroit, MI | W 65–2 | |
| November 13 | West Virginia Wesleyan | Detroit, MI | W 29–0 | |
| November 20 | at Springfield | Springfield, MA | L 3–7 | |
| November 25 | Rutgers | Detroit, MI | W 27–0 | |
| December 4 | at Tulane | New Orleans, LA | W 7–0 | |
