= 1920 Michigan Agricultural Aggies football team =

American college football season

1920 Michigan Agricultural Aggies football
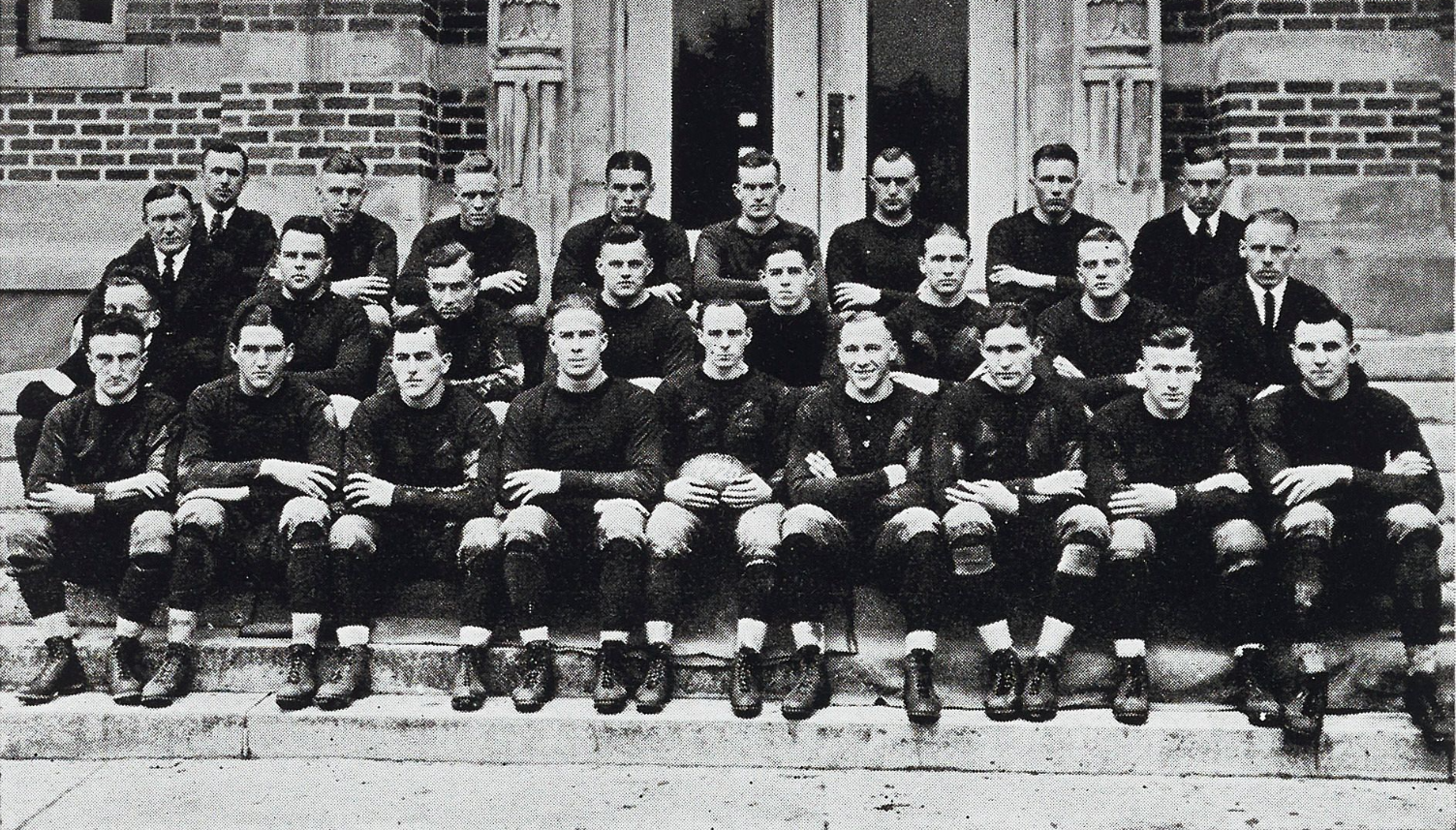
- Conference: Independent
- Record: 4–6
- Head coach: George Clark (1st season)
- Captain: Harold A. Springer
- Home stadium: College Field

1920 Midwestern college football independents records
	Conf.			Overall
Team	W	L	T	W		L		T
Notre Dame		–		9	–	0	–	0
Michigan Mines		–		2	–	0	–	0
Butler		–		7	–	1	–	0
St. Xavier		–		7	–	1	–	0
Detroit		–		8	–	2	–	0
Marquette		–		7	–	2	–	0
Haskell		–		7	–	2	–	1
St. Ignatius (OH)		–		4	–	2	–	0
Iowa State Teachers		–		4	–	2	–	1
South Dakota State		–		4	–	2	–	1
Indiana State		–		3	–	2	–	0
Valparaiso		–		5	–	3	–	0
Nebraska		–		5	–	3	–	1
Central Michigan		–		4	–	3	–	1
Akron		–		4	–	4	–	0
Wabash		–		3	–	4	–	0
Western State Normal		–		3	–	4	–	0
North Dakota Agricultural		–		2	–	3	–	1
Michigan Agricultural		–		4	–	6	–	0
Earlham		–		2	–	3	–	0
Northern Illinois State		–		3	–	5	–	0
Dayton		–		2	–	4	–	0
Kent State		–		1	–	2	–	0
Saint Louis		–		3	–	6	–	0
Bowling Green		–		1	–	4	–	0
Toledo		–		0	–	3	–	0

The 1920 Michigan Agricultural Aggies football team was an American football team that represented Michigan Agricultural College (MAC) as an independent during the 1920 college football season. In their first and only year under head coach George Clark, the Aggies compiled a 4–6 record and outscored their opponents 270 to 166.

On October 30, the Aggies set a school scoring record with 109 points against Olivet. After a bye week, the team scored 81 points against the Chicago YMCA. The Aggies won the two games by a total of 190 to 0.

In April 1921, coach Clark left Michigan Agricultural to become head football coach at the University of Kansas. He later led the 1935 Detroit Lions team to the NFL Championship.

== Schedule ==
Date	Opponent	Site	Result	Attendance	Source
September 25	Kalamazoo	College Field; East Lansing, MI	L 2–21		
October 2	Albion	College Field; East Lansing, MI	W 16–0		
October 6	Alma	College Field; East Lansing, MI	W 48–0		
October 9	at Wisconsin	Camp Randall Stadium; Madison, WI	L 0–27		
October 16	at Michigan	Ferry Field; Ann Arbor, MI (rivalry)	L 0–35	20,000	
October 23	Marietta	College Field; East Lansing, MI	L 7–23		
October 30	Olivet	College Field; East Lansing, MI	W 109–0		
November 13	Chicago YMCA^{†}	College Field; East Lansing, MI	W 81–0		
November 20	at Nebraska	Nebraska Field; Lincoln, NE	L 7–35		
November 25	Notre Dame	College Field; East Lansing, MI (rivalry)	L 0–25	8,000	
^{†}Homecoming
