= 1920 University of Dayton football team =

American college football season

1920 Dayton football
- Conference: Independent
- Record: 2–4
- Head coach: Bud Talbott (1st season)
- Home stadium: Varsity Field

1920 Midwestern college football independents records
	Conf.			Overall
Team	W	L	T	W		L		T
Notre Dame		–		9	–	0	–	0
Michigan Mines		–		2	–	0	–	0
Butler		–		7	–	1	–	0
St. Xavier		–		7	–	1	–	0
Detroit		–		8	–	2	–	0
Marquette		–		7	–	2	–	0
Haskell		–		7	–	2	–	1
St. Ignatius (OH)		–		4	–	2	–	0
Iowa State Teachers		–		4	–	2	–	1
South Dakota State		–		4	–	2	–	1
Indiana State		–		3	–	2	–	0
Valparaiso		–		5	–	3	–	0
Nebraska		–		5	–	3	–	1
Central Michigan		–		4	–	3	–	1
Akron		–		4	–	4	–	0
Wabash		–		3	–	4	–	0
Western State Normal		–		3	–	4	–	0
North Dakota Agricultural		–		2	–	3	–	1
Michigan Agricultural		–		4	–	6	–	0
Earlham		–		2	–	3	–	0
Northern Illinois State		–		3	–	5	–	0
Dayton		–		2	–	4	–	0
Kent State		–		1	–	2	–	0
Saint Louis		–		3	–	6	–	0
Bowling Green		–		1	–	4	–	0
Toledo		–		0	–	3	–	0

The 1920 Dayton football team was an American football team that represented the University of Dayton as an independent during the 1920 college football season. In its first season under head coach Bud Talbott, the team compiled a 2–4 record.

== Schedule ==
Date	Opponent	Site	Result	Source
October 2	at Ohio Northern	Ada, OH	W 13–7	
October 9	at St. Xavier	Avon Field; Cincinnati, OH	L 0–20	
October 16	at St. Ignatius (OH)	Cleveland, OH	L 0–13	
October 23	at Muskingum	New Concord, OH	L 0–4	
November 12	at Georgetown (KY)	Hinton Field; Georgetown, KY	W 6–5	
November 20	at Duquesne	Pittsburgh, PA	L 0–14	
