= 1924–25 Michigan College of Mines Huskies men's ice hockey season =

- Conference: Independent

Record
- Overall: 2–4–0

Coaches and captains
- Head coach: Leon Harvey
- Captain: Robert Zyrd

The 1924–25 Michigan College of Mines Huskies men's ice hockey season was the 6th season of play for the program. The Huskies were coached by Leon Harvey in his 1st season.

== Season ==
Bringing in the fifth different head coach for the program's sixth year of existence, Michigan College of Mines turned the ice hockey team over to the school's head football and basketball coach, Leon Harvey. Though he had grown up in Massachusetts and attended YMCA College, there's no indication that Harvey had any experience with ice hockey prior to the appointment. However, a larger concern was the team's inability to schedule games with other universities. The Huskies were also harmed by a warm winter that allowed them only one game in February and, though they were finally able to get couple victories after two winless seasons, the team was nonetheless forced to stomach another suboptimal year.

== Roster ==
No.	Nat.	Player	Class	Pos	Height	Weight	DoB	Hometown	Previous team
		Robert Zyrd (C)

== Standings ==
1924–25 Western Collegiate ice hockey standings
	Intercollegiate							Overall					
	GP	W	L	T	Pct.	GF	GA	GP	W	L	T	GF	GA
Carleton	4	3	1	0	.750	11	9	4	3	1	0	11	9
Hamline	2	0	2	0	.000	1	8	2	0	2	0	1	8
Macalester	4	2	2	0	.500	9	9	6	3	3	0	15	14
Marquette	2	0	2	0	.000	0	5	3	1	2	0	1	5
Michigan	–	–	–	–	–	–	–	6	4	1	1	12	6
Michigan Agricultural	–	–	–	–	–	–	–	1	0	1	0	3	6
Michigan College of Mines	0	0	0	0	–	0	0	6	2	4	0	12	18
Minnesota	–	–	–	–	–	–	–	10	8	1	1	18	4
Notre Dame	3	0	2	1	.167	3	6	4	0	2	2	5	8
St. Thomas	2	1	0	1	.750	9	3	2	1	0	1	9	3
USC	–	–	–	–	–	–	–	–	–	–	–	–	–
Wisconsin	–	–	–	–	–	–	–	9	1	7	1	6	14

== Schedule and results ==
Date	Opponent	Site	Result	Record
Regular Season
January 12	Mohawk*	?	W 2–1	1–0–0
January 14	at Calumet*	Calumet Colosseum • Calumet, Michigan	L 3–4	1–1–0
January 21	Mohawk*	?	L 1–5	1–2–0
January 25	Naval Reserves*	?	L 3–5	1–3–0
January 30	at Calumet*	Calumet Colosseum • Calumet, Michigan	W 3–2	2–3–0
February 15	Naval Reserves*	?	L 0–1	2–4–0
*Non-conference game.
