= 1920 North Dakota Agricultural Aggies football team =

American college football season

1920 North Dakota Agricultural Aggies football
- Conference: Independent
- Record: 2–3–1
- Head coach: Stanley Borleske (2nd season)
- Captain: S. Lynn Huey
- Home stadium: Dacotah Field

1920 Midwestern college football independents records
	Conf.			Overall
Team	W	L	T	W		L		T
Notre Dame		–		9	–	0	–	0
Michigan Mines		–		2	–	0	–	0
Butler		–		7	–	1	–	0
St. Xavier		–		7	–	1	–	0
Detroit		–		8	–	2	–	0
Marquette		–		7	–	2	–	0
Haskell		–		7	–	2	–	1
St. Ignatius (OH)		–		4	–	2	–	0
Iowa State Teachers		–		4	–	2	–	1
South Dakota State		–		4	–	2	–	1
Indiana State		–		3	–	2	–	0
Valparaiso		–		5	–	3	–	0
Nebraska		–		5	–	3	–	1
Central Michigan		–		4	–	3	–	1
Akron		–		4	–	4	–	0
Wabash		–		3	–	4	–	0
Western State Normal		–		3	–	4	–	0
North Dakota Agricultural		–		2	–	3	–	1
Michigan Agricultural		–		4	–	6	–	0
Earlham		–		2	–	3	–	0
Northern Illinois State		–		3	–	5	–	0
Dayton		–		2	–	4	–	0
Kent State		–		1	–	2	–	0
Saint Louis		–		3	–	6	–	0
Bowling Green		–		1	–	4	–	0
Toledo		–		0	–	3	–	0

The 1920 North Dakota Agricultural Aggies football team was an American football team that represented North Dakota Agricultural College (now known as North Dakota State University) as an independent during the 1920 college football season. In their second year under head coach Stanley Borleske, the team compiled a 2–3–1 record.

== Schedule ==
Date	Opponent	Site	Result	Source
October 9	Jamestown	Dacotah Field; Fargo, ND	T 7–7	
October 16	at St. Thomas (MN)	Cadet Field; St. Paul, MN	W 20–6	
October 23	at South Dakota State	Brookings, SD (rivalry)	L 7–27	
October 30	North Dakota	Dacotah Field; Fargo, ND (rivalry)	L 7–14	
November 6	Fargo	Dacotah Field; Fargo, ND	W 7–0	
November 19	at Hamline	St. Paul, MN	L 6–21	
