= 1920 Haskell Indians football team =

American college football season

1920 Haskell Indians football
- Conference: Independent
- Record: 7–2–1
- Head coach: Matty Bell (1st season)
- Home stadium: Haskell Field

1920 Midwestern college football independents records
	Conf.			Overall
Team	W	L	T	W		L		T
Notre Dame		–		9	–	0	–	0
Michigan Mines		–		2	–	0	–	0
Butler		–		7	–	1	–	0
St. Xavier		–		7	–	1	–	0
Detroit		–		8	–	2	–	0
Marquette		–		7	–	2	–	0
Haskell		–		7	–	2	–	1
St. Ignatius (OH)		–		4	–	2	–	0
Iowa State Teachers		–		4	–	2	–	1
South Dakota State		–		4	–	2	–	1
Indiana State		–		3	–	2	–	0
Valparaiso		–		5	–	3	–	0
Nebraska		–		5	–	3	–	1
Central Michigan		–		4	–	3	–	1
Akron		–		4	–	4	–	0
Wabash		–		3	–	4	–	0
Western State Normal		–		3	–	4	–	0
North Dakota Agricultural		–		2	–	3	–	1
Michigan Agricultural		–		4	–	6	–	0
Earlham		–		2	–	3	–	0
Northern Illinois State		–		3	–	5	–	0
Dayton		–		2	–	4	–	0
Kent State		–		1	–	2	–	0
Saint Louis		–		3	–	6	–	0
Bowling Green		–		1	–	4	–	0
Toledo		–		0	–	3	–	0

The 1920 Haskell Indians football team was an American football team that represented the Haskell Institute (later renamed Haskell Indian Nations University) as an independent during the 1920 college football season. In its first season under head coach Matty Bell, the team compiled a 7–2–1 record.

== Schedule ==
Date	Time	Opponent	Site	Result	Attendance	Source
September 24		Baker	Lawrence, KS	W 14–0		
October 1	3:00 p.m.	Pittsburg Normal	Fair grounds	T 14–14		
October 8		at Phillips	Enid, OK	L 6–7		
October 15		Hays Normal	McCook Field; Lawrence, KS	W 33–6		
October 22		at Kansas Wesleyan	Salina, KS	W 47–0		
October 30		at Saint Louis	St. Louis, MO	W 21–6	5,000	
November 6		at Marquette	Milwaukee, WI	W 6–3	16,000	
November 12		Kirksville Osteopaths	Haskell Field; Lawrence, KS	W 48–7		
November 20	2:30 p.m.	vs. Oklahoma A&M	Association Park; Kansas City, MO	W 33–7	5,000	
November 25		at St. Xavier	Redland Field; Cincinnati, OH	L 7–21	7,000	
All times are in Central time
