= 1920 Central Michigan Normalites football team =

American college football season

1920 Central Michigan Normalites football
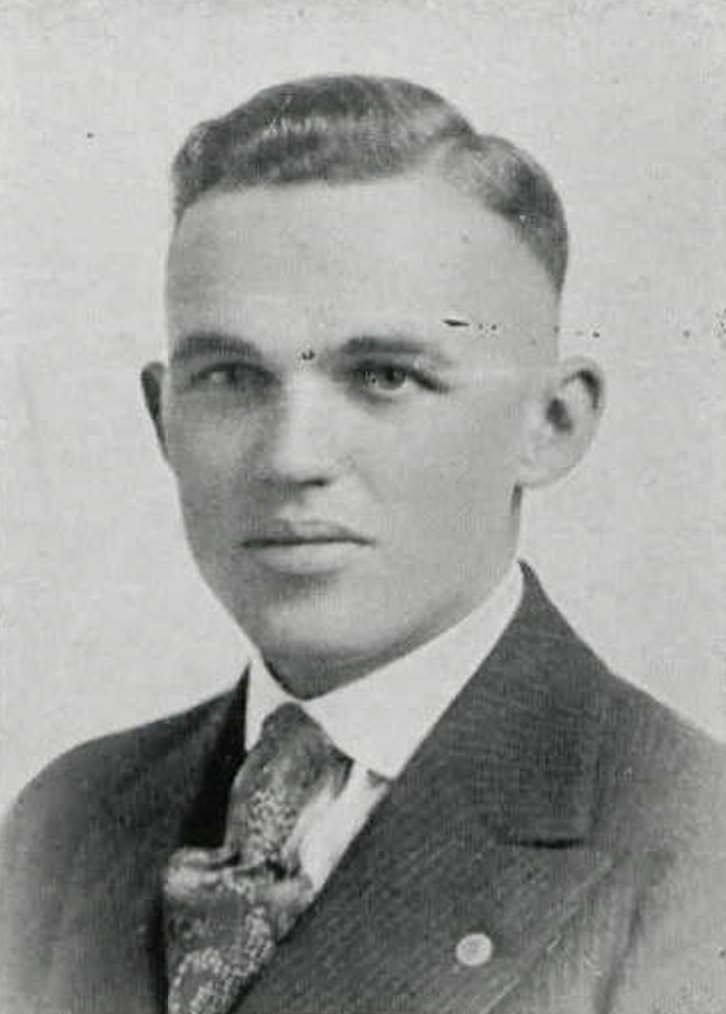
- Coach Joe Simmons from The Chippewa (1921)
- Conference: Independent
- Record: 4–3–1
- Head coach: Joe Simmons (1st season)

1920 Midwestern college football independents records
	Conf.			Overall
Team	W	L	T	W		L		T
Notre Dame		–		9	–	0	–	0
Michigan Mines		–		2	–	0	–	0
Butler		–		7	–	1	–	0
St. Xavier		–		7	–	1	–	0
Detroit		–		8	–	2	–	0
Marquette		–		7	–	2	–	0
Haskell		–		7	–	2	–	1
St. Ignatius (OH)		–		4	–	2	–	0
Iowa State Teachers		–		4	–	2	–	1
South Dakota State		–		4	–	2	–	1
Indiana State		–		3	–	2	–	0
Valparaiso		–		5	–	3	–	0
Nebraska		–		5	–	3	–	1
Central Michigan		–		4	–	3	–	1
Akron		–		4	–	4	–	0
Wabash		–		3	–	4	–	0
Western State Normal		–		3	–	4	–	0
North Dakota Agricultural		–		2	–	3	–	1
Michigan Agricultural		–		4	–	6	–	0
Earlham		–		2	–	3	–	0
Northern Illinois State		–		3	–	5	–	0
Dayton		–		2	–	4	–	0
Kent State		–		1	–	2	–	0
Saint Louis		–		3	–	6	–	0
Bowling Green		–		1	–	4	–	0
Toledo		–		0	–	3	–	0

The 1920 Central Michigan Normalites football team represented Central Michigan Normal School, later renamed Central Michigan University, as an independent during the 1920 college football season. In their first and only season under head coach Joe Simmons, the Central Michigan football team compiled a 4–3–1 record, shut out four of eight opponents, and outscored all opponents by a combined total of 166 to 41. The team's victories were against Ferris Institute (80–0 and 34–0), Olivet (7–0), and Hope (17–0), and the tie was with Detroit Junior College (6–6). The team lost to Michigan State Normal (7–6), the Michigan Agricultural freshmen (14–6), and Hillsdale (14–10).

Coach Simmons was a recent graduate of Carthage College in Kenosha, Wisconsin, where he earned 16 varsity letters in four sports. He later coached high school football in Milwaukee.

== Schedule ==
Date	Opponent	Site	Result
October 9	Ferris Institute	Mount Pleasant, MI	W 80–0
October 16	at Michigan State Normal	Ypsilanti, MI (rivalry)	L 6–7
October 23	Olivet	Mount Pleasant, MI	W 7–0
October 30	at Ferris Institute	Big Rapids, MI	W 34–0
November 6	Michigan Agricultural freshmen	Mount Pleasant, MI	L 6–14
November 13	at Hillsdale	Hillsdale, MI	L 10–14
November 20	at Hope	Holland, MI	W 17–0
November 24	at Detroit Junior College	Detroit, MI	T 6–6
