= 1920 Kent State Silver Foxes football team =

American college football season

1920 Kent State Silver Foxes football
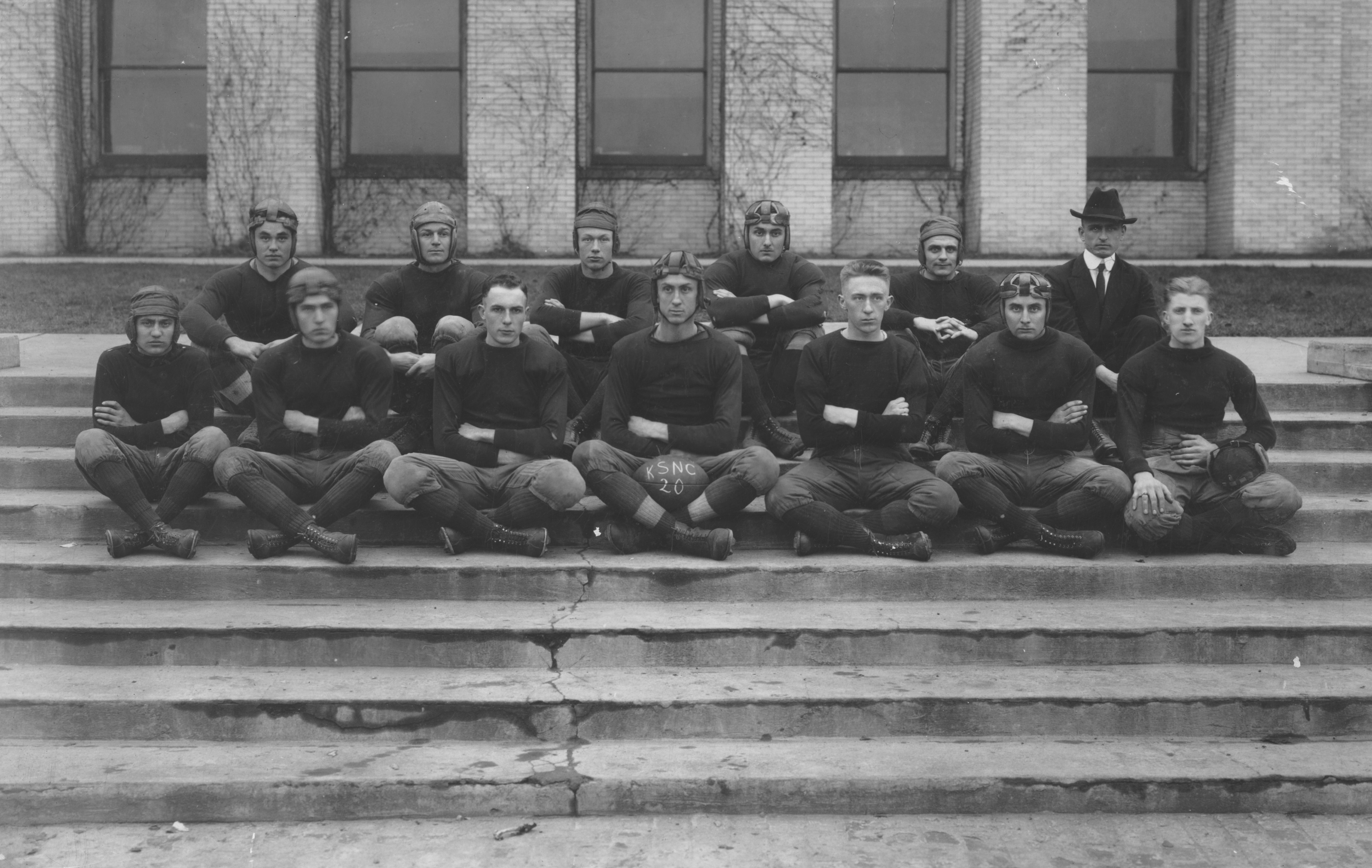
- Conference: Independent
- Record: 1–2
- Head coach: Paul G. Chandler (1st season)
- Home stadium: Rockwell Field

1920 Midwestern college football independents records
	Conf.			Overall
Team	W	L	T	W		L		T
Notre Dame		–		9	–	0	–	0
Michigan Mines		–		2	–	0	–	0
Butler		–		7	–	1	–	0
St. Xavier		–		7	–	1	–	0
Detroit		–		8	–	2	–	0
Marquette		–		7	–	2	–	0
Haskell		–		7	–	2	–	1
St. Ignatius (OH)		–		4	–	2	–	0
Iowa State Teachers		–		4	–	2	–	1
South Dakota State		–		4	–	2	–	1
Indiana State		–		3	–	2	–	0
Valparaiso		–		5	–	3	–	0
Nebraska		–		5	–	3	–	1
Central Michigan		–		4	–	3	–	1
Akron		–		4	–	4	–	0
Wabash		–		3	–	4	–	0
Western State Normal		–		3	–	4	–	0
North Dakota Agricultural		–		2	–	3	–	1
Michigan Agricultural		–		4	–	6	–	0
Earlham		–		2	–	3	–	0
Northern Illinois State		–		3	–	5	–	0
Dayton		–		2	–	4	–	0
Kent State		–		1	–	2	–	0
Saint Louis		–		3	–	6	–	0
Bowling Green		–		1	–	4	–	0
Toledo		–		0	–	3	–	0

The 1920 Kent State Silver Foxes football team represented Kent State during the 1920 college football season. In its first season of intercollegiate football, the team compiled a 1–2 record with the sole victory coming by way of a forfeit.

The team was coached by Paul G. Chandler, the head of the school's education department.

Kent State began operating in 1912, and the 1920 football team was the first athletic team to represent the school in any sport. A football team had not been fielded earlier due in part to the fact that few men were enrolled at the school. The 1920 team included the majority of the men who were then enrolled. The surviving members of the 1920 team returned to campus and were honored at a 1970 football game.

The 1921 Kent State yearbook, The Chestnut Burr said the following of the 1920 football team:

Last year no one imagined that a foot-ball team was within the possibilities of our college, because we hadn't the first requisite — men. This year we have men enough in school to organize a football team. The boys practiced faithfully and played some good games. One College sent their team here for a scheduled game. When they came they declined to play. Their reason was that the weather was too inclement, but it was not too bad for our boys to play and for our girls to gather en masse to help our boys win by their cheering. It was quite evident to us that the incoming team was scared. They did not expect to find well trained players. When they found men ready to win their ardor cooled and they went home without playing the game.

The Chestnut Burr also described the excitement on campus prior to the first home game against Bowling Green:

Probably the most remarkable campaign by the girls was the snake dance throughout the town, one cold, crisp evening before the game with Bowling Green. In and out of shops and movies the screaming and jolly line ran, bellowing forth our yells and songs, which in no small way interpreted our deep loyalty and fighting spirit for K. S. N. C. We did not win the next day but we played fair and square which is really the true test of athletics.

== Schedule ==
Date	Opponent	Site	Result	Source
October 30	at Ashland	Ashland, OH	L 0–6	
November 6	Bowling Green	Rockwell Field; Kent, OH (rivalry)	L 0–7	
	St. Ignatius		W 1–0 (forfeit)	
