= 1920 Valparaiso University football team =

American college football season

1920 Valparaiso University football
- Conference: Independent
- Record: 5–3
- Head coach: George Keogan (2nd season)
- Captain: Kenneth Conley (left tackle)
- Home stadium: Brown Field

1920 Midwestern college football independents records
| | Conf. | | | Overall |
| Team | W | L | T | W | | L | | T |
|---|---|---|---|---|---|---|---|---|
| Notre Dame | | – | | 9 | – | 0 | – | 0 |
| Michigan Mines | | – | | 2 | – | 0 | – | 0 |
| Butler | | – | | 7 | – | 1 | – | 0 |
| St. Xavier | | – | | 7 | – | 1 | – | 0 |
| Detroit | | – | | 8 | – | 2 | – | 0 |
| Marquette | | – | | 7 | – | 2 | – | 0 |
| Haskell | | – | | 7 | – | 2 | – | 1 |
| St. Ignatius (OH) | | – | | 4 | – | 2 | – | 0 |
| Iowa State Teachers | | – | | 4 | – | 2 | – | 1 |
| South Dakota State | | – | | 4 | – | 2 | – | 1 |
| Indiana State | | – | | 3 | – | 2 | – | 0 |
| Valparaiso | | – | | 5 | – | 3 | – | 0 |
| Nebraska | | – | | 5 | – | 3 | – | 1 |
| Central Michigan | | – | | 4 | – | 3 | – | 1 |
| Akron | | – | | 4 | – | 4 | – | 0 |
| Wabash | | – | | 3 | – | 4 | – | 0 |
| Western State Normal | | – | | 3 | – | 4 | – | 0 |
| North Dakota Agricultural | | – | | 2 | – | 3 | – | 1 |
| Michigan Agricultural | | – | | 4 | – | 6 | – | 0 |
| Earlham | | – | | 2 | – | 3 | – | 0 |
| Northern Illinois State | | – | | 3 | – | 5 | – | 0 |
| Dayton | | – | | 2 | – | 4 | – | 0 |
| Kent State | | – | | 1 | – | 2 | – | 0 |
| Saint Louis | | – | | 3 | – | 6 | – | 0 |
| Bowling Green | | – | | 1 | – | 4 | – | 0 |
| Toledo | | – | | 0 | – | 3 | – | 0 |

The 1920 Valparaiso University football team represented Valparaiso University in the 1920 college football season. In George Keogan's second year as head coach, the Crusaders compiled a 5–3 record and outscored their opponents 215 to 60. Notable games included losses to Harvard and Notre Dame, who were each recognized as national champions, Harvard by Boand and Notre Dame by Billingsley and Parke H. Davis.

== Schedule ==
| Date | Opponent | Site | Result | Attendance | Source |
|---|---|---|---|---|---|
| September 24 | Carroll (WI) | Brown Field; Valparaiso, IN | W 52–0 | | |
| October 9 | at Harvard | Harvard Stadium; Boston, MA | L 0–21 | 18,000 | |
| October 16 | Northwestern College | Brown Field; Valparaiso, IN | W 85–0 | | |
| October 23 | at Notre Dame | Cartier Field; Notre Dame, IN | L 3–28 | 8,000–10,000 | |
| October 29 | at DePauw | McKeen Field; Greencastle, IN | L 0–1 (forfeit) | | |
| November 5 | Saint Louis | Brown Field; Valparaiso, IN | W 41–0 | 4,000 | |
| November 13 | Morningside | Brown Field; Valparaiso, IN | W 14–0 | | |
| November 25 | vs. North Dakota | Gary, IN | W 20–10 | 7,000 | |
