= 1920 Saint Louis Billikens football team =

American college football season

1920 Saint Louis Billikens football
- Conference: Independent
- Record: 3–6
- Head coach: Charles M. Rademacher (3rd season)
- Home stadium: St. Louis University campus, Sportsman's Park

1920 Midwestern college football independents records
	Conf.			Overall
Team	W	L	T	W		L		T
Notre Dame		–		9	–	0	–	0
Michigan Mines		–		2	–	0	–	0
Butler		–		7	–	1	–	0
St. Xavier		–		7	–	1	–	0
Detroit		–		8	–	2	–	0
Marquette		–		7	–	2	–	0
Haskell		–		7	–	2	–	1
St. Ignatius (OH)		–		4	–	2	–	0
Iowa State Teachers		–		4	–	2	–	1
South Dakota State		–		4	–	2	–	1
Indiana State		–		3	–	2	–	0
Valparaiso		–		5	–	3	–	0
Nebraska		–		5	–	3	–	1
Central Michigan		–		4	–	3	–	1
Akron		–		4	–	4	–	0
Wabash		–		3	–	4	–	0
Western State Normal		–		3	–	4	–	0
North Dakota Agricultural		–		2	–	3	–	1
Michigan Agricultural		–		4	–	6	–	0
Earlham		–		2	–	3	–	0
Northern Illinois State		–		3	–	5	–	0
Dayton		–		2	–	4	–	0
Kent State		–		1	–	2	–	0
Saint Louis		–		3	–	6	–	0
Bowling Green		–		1	–	4	–	0
Toledo		–		0	–	3	–	0

The 1920 Saint Louis Billikens football team was an American football team that represented Saint Louis University as an independent during the 1920 college football season. In their third and final season under head coach Charles M. Rademacher, the Billikens compiled a 3–6 record and was outscored by a total of 220 to 81.

== Schedule ==
Date	Time	Opponent	Site	Result	Attendance	Source
September 25		Cape Girardeau Normal	St. Louis University campus; St. Louis, MO	W 22–0		
October 2		Rose Polytechnic	St. Louis, MO	W 12–0		
October 9		Missouri	Sportsman's Park; St. Louis, MO	L 0–44	10,000	
October 16		at Detroit	Navin Field; Detroit, MI	L 0–48		
October 23		Missouri Mines	St. Louis, MO	W 27–0		
October 30		Haskell	Sportsman's Park; St. Louis, MO	L 6–21	5,000	
November 5		at Valparaiso	Valparaiso, IN	L 0–41		
November 13		Marquette	Sportsman's Park; St. Louis, MO	L 14–49		
November 25	2:00 p.m.	at Washington University	Francis Field; St. Louis, MO	L 0–17	12,000	
All times are in Central time
