= 1920 South Dakota State Jackrabbits football team =

American college football season

1920 South Dakota State Jackrabbits football
- Conference: Independent
- Record: 4–2–1
- Head coach: Charles A. West (2nd season)

1920 Midwestern college football independents records
	Conf.			Overall
Team	W	L	T	W		L		T
Notre Dame		–		9	–	0	–	0
Michigan Mines		–		2	–	0	–	0
Butler		–		7	–	1	–	0
St. Xavier		–		7	–	1	–	0
Detroit		–		8	–	2	–	0
Marquette		–		7	–	2	–	0
Haskell		–		7	–	2	–	1
St. Ignatius (OH)		–		4	–	2	–	0
Iowa State Teachers		–		4	–	2	–	1
South Dakota State		–		4	–	2	–	1
Indiana State		–		3	–	2	–	0
Valparaiso		–		5	–	3	–	0
Nebraska		–		5	–	3	–	1
Central Michigan		–		4	–	3	–	1
Akron		–		4	–	4	–	0
Wabash		–		3	–	4	–	0
Western State Normal		–		3	–	4	–	0
North Dakota Agricultural		–		2	–	3	–	1
Michigan Agricultural		–		4	–	6	–	0
Earlham		–		2	–	3	–	0
Northern Illinois State		–		3	–	5	–	0
Dayton		–		2	–	4	–	0
Kent State		–		1	–	2	–	0
Saint Louis		–		3	–	6	–	0
Bowling Green		–		1	–	4	–	0
Toledo		–		0	–	3	–	0

The 1920 South Dakota State Jackrabbits football team was an American football team that represented South Dakota State University as an independent during the 1920 college football season. In its second season under head coach Charles A. West, the team compiled a 4–2–1 record and outscored opponents by a total of 66 to 27.

== Schedule ==
Date	Opponent	Site	Result	Source
October 2	at Northern Normal	Aberdeen, SD	W 6–0	
October 9	at Dakota Wesleyan	Mitchell, SD	W 6–0	
October 16	at North Dakota	Grand Forks, ND	L 3–6	
October 23	North Dakota Agricultural	Brookings, SD (rivalry)	W 27–7	
October 30	Macalester	Brookings, SD	T 7–7	
November 5	Hamline	Brookings, SD	W 14–0	
November 13	vs. South Dakota	East Side Athletic Field; Sioux Falls, SD (rivalry)	L 3–7	
