= 1920 Earlham Quakers football team =

American college football season

1920 Earlham Quakers football
- Conference: Independent
- Record: 3–3
- Head coach: Ray Mowe (2nd season)
- Home stadium: Reid Field

1920 Midwestern college football independents records
	Conf.			Overall
Team	W	L	T	W		L		T
Notre Dame		–		9	–	0	–	0
Michigan Mines		–		2	–	0	–	0
Butler		–		7	–	1	–	0
St. Xavier		–		7	–	1	–	0
Detroit		–		8	–	2	–	0
Marquette		–		7	–	2	–	0
Haskell		–		7	–	2	–	1
St. Ignatius (OH)		–		4	–	2	–	0
Iowa State Teachers		–		4	–	2	–	1
South Dakota State		–		4	–	2	–	1
Indiana State		–		3	–	2	–	0
Valparaiso		–		5	–	3	–	0
Nebraska		–		5	–	3	–	1
Central Michigan		–		4	–	3	–	1
Akron		–		4	–	4	–	0
Wabash		–		3	–	4	–	0
Western State Normal		–		3	–	4	–	0
North Dakota Agricultural		–		2	–	3	–	1
Michigan Agricultural		–		4	–	6	–	0
Earlham		–		2	–	3	–	0
Northern Illinois State		–		3	–	5	–	0
Dayton		–		2	–	4	–	0
Kent State		–		1	–	2	–	0
Saint Louis		–		3	–	6	–	0
Bowling Green		–		1	–	4	–	0
Toledo		–		0	–	3	–	0

The 1920 Earlham Quakers football team represented Earlham College as an independent during the 1920 college football season. Led by second-year head coach Ray Mowe, the Quakers compiled a record of 3–3.

== Schedule ==
Date	Opponent	Site	Result	Source
October 2	Hanover	Reid Field; Richmond, IN	W 28–3	
October 9	at Wilmington (OH)	Wilmington, OH	W 35–0	
October 16	Rose Poly	Richmond, IN	W 7–6	
October 23	at Butler	Indianapolis, IN	L 13–7	
November 6	Western State Normal	Reid Field; Richmond, IN	L 6–0	
November 20	at Franklin (IN)	Franklin, IN	L 24–14	
