= 1920 St. Xavier Saints football team =

American college football season

1920 St. Xavier Saints football
- Conference: Independent
- Record: 7–1
- Head coach: Joseph A. Meyer (1st season)

1920 Midwestern college football independents records
	Conf.			Overall
Team	W	L	T	W		L		T
Notre Dame		–		9	–	0	–	0
Michigan Mines		–		2	–	0	–	0
Butler		–		7	–	1	–	0
St. Xavier		–		7	–	1	–	0
Detroit		–		8	–	2	–	0
Marquette		–		7	–	2	–	0
Haskell		–		7	–	2	–	1
St. Ignatius (OH)		–		4	–	2	–	0
Iowa State Teachers		–		4	–	2	–	1
South Dakota State		–		4	–	2	–	1
Indiana State		–		3	–	2	–	0
Valparaiso		–		5	–	3	–	0
Nebraska		–		5	–	3	–	1
Central Michigan		–		4	–	3	–	1
Akron		–		4	–	4	–	0
Wabash		–		3	–	4	–	0
Western State Normal		–		3	–	4	–	0
North Dakota Agricultural		–		2	–	3	–	1
Michigan Agricultural		–		4	–	6	–	0
Earlham		–		2	–	3	–	0
Northern Illinois State		–		3	–	5	–	0
Dayton		–		2	–	4	–	0
Kent State		–		1	–	2	–	0
Saint Louis		–		3	–	6	–	0
Bowling Green		–		1	–	4	–	0
Toledo		–		0	–	3	–	0

The 1920 St. Xavier Musketeers football team was an American football team that represented St. Xavier College (later renamed Xavier University) as an independent during the 1920 college football season. In its first season under head coach Joseph A. Meyer, the team compiled a 7–1 record and outscored opponents by a total of 299 to 38.

== Schedule ==
Date	Opponent	Site	Result	Source
October 2	at Miami (OH)	Miami Field; Oxford, OH	L 0–31	
October 9	Dayton	Avon Field; Cincinnati, OH	W 20–0	
October 16	at Georgetown (KY)	Georgetown, KY	W 27–0	
October 23	Hanover	Avon Field; Cincinnati, OH	W 76–0	
October 30	at Wilmington (OH)	Wilmington, OH	W 83–0	
November 6	Rose Polytechnic	Avon Field; Cincinnati, OH	W 56–0	
November 13	at St. Ignatius (OH)	Cleveland, OH	W 17–0	
November 25	Haskell	Redland Field; Cincinnati, OH	W 21–7	
