= 1920 Western State Normal Hilltoppers football team =

American college football season

1920 Western State Normal Hilltoppers football
- Conference: Independent
- Record: 3–4
- Head coach: William H. Spaulding (14th season)
- Captain: Grant Westgate
- Home stadium: Normal field

1920 Midwestern college football independents records
	Conf.			Overall
Team	W	L	T	W		L		T
Notre Dame		–		9	–	0	–	0
Michigan Mines		–		2	–	0	–	0
Butler		–		7	–	1	–	0
St. Xavier		–		7	–	1	–	0
Detroit		–		8	–	2	–	0
Marquette		–		7	–	2	–	0
Haskell		–		7	–	2	–	1
St. Ignatius (OH)		–		4	–	2	–	0
Iowa State Teachers		–		4	–	2	–	1
South Dakota State		–		4	–	2	–	1
Indiana State		–		3	–	2	–	0
Valparaiso		–		5	–	3	–	0
Nebraska		–		5	–	3	–	1
Central Michigan		–		4	–	3	–	1
Akron		–		4	–	4	–	0
Wabash		–		3	–	4	–	0
Western State Normal		–		3	–	4	–	0
North Dakota Agricultural		–		2	–	3	–	1
Michigan Agricultural		–		4	–	6	–	0
Earlham		–		2	–	3	–	0
Northern Illinois State		–		3	–	5	–	0
Dayton		–		2	–	4	–	0
Kent State		–		1	–	2	–	0
Saint Louis		–		3	–	6	–	0
Bowling Green		–		1	–	4	–	0
Toledo		–		0	–	3	–	0

The 1920 Western State Normal Hilltoppers football team represented Western State Normal School (later renamed Western Michigan University) as an independent during the 1920 college football season. In their 14th season under head coach William H. Spaulding, the Hilltoppers compiled a 3–4 record and were outscored by their opponents, 131 to 119. End Grant Westgate was the team captain.

== Schedule ==
Date	Time	Opponent	Site	Result	Attendance	Source
October 2	3:00 p.m.	Olivet	Normal field; Kalamazoo, MI	W 54–7		
October 9	2:15 p.m.	at Notre Dame	Cartier Field; Notre Dame, IN	L 0–42	3,500	
October 16	3:00 p.m.	Chicago YMCA College	Normal field; Kalamazoo, MI	L 6–10		
October 23		at Marquette	Milwaukee, WI	L 7–46		
October 30	2:15 p.m.	Hope	Normal field; Kalamazoo, MI	W 46–0		
November 6		at Earlham	Reid Field; Richmond, IN	W 6–0		
November 12		at Wabash	Crawfordsville, IN	L 7–27		
All times are in Central time
