= Joe Simmons (coach) =

American sports coach (1895–1973)

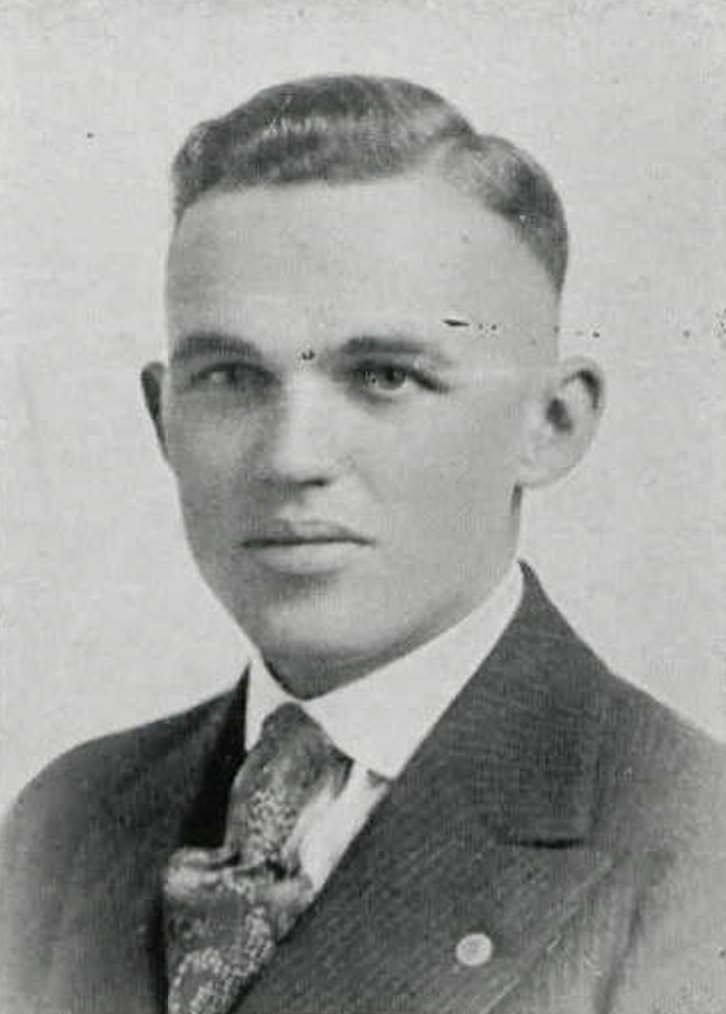
- Simmons pictured in Chippewa 1921, Central Michigan yearbook

Biographical details
- Born: June 5, 1895; Illinois, U.S.
- Died: March 4, 1973 (aged 77); Laguna Beach, California, U.S.

Playing career

Football
- 1913–1915: Carthage

Coaching career (HC unless noted)

Football
- 1920: Central Michigan
- late 1920s: South Milwaukee HS (WI)
- 1928–1936: Milwaukee Country Day (WI)
- 1937–1939: Yale (assistant)

Basketball
- 1920–1921: Central Michigan

Baseball
- 1921: Central Michigan

Head coaching record
- Overall: 4–3–1 (college football); 11—5 (college basketball); 10–1–1 (college baseball)

Joseph F. Simmons (June 5, 1895 – March 4, 1973) was an American football, basketball, and baseball coach. He served as the head football coach at Central Michigan University for one season in 1920, compiling a record of 4–3–1. He was also the head basketball and head baseball coach at Central Michigan during the same academic year. Simmons graduated from Carthage College, where played football, basketball, and baseball, and ran track. He coached high school football at South Milwaukee High School in the late 1920s and at Milwaukee Country Day School from 1928 to 1936. He was an assistant football coach at Yale University from 1937 to 1939.

== Head coaching record ==
=== College football ===
Year	Team	Overall	Conference	Standing	Bowl/playoffs
Central Michigan Normalites (Independent) (1920)
1920	Central Michigan	4–3–1			
Central Michigan:		4–3–1			
Total:		4–3–1			
