= 1920 Case Scientists football team =

American college football season

1920 Case Scientists football
- Conference: Ohio Athletic Conference
- Record: 2–8–1 (2–5–1 OAC)
- Head coach: Harry H. Canfield (1st season)
- Home stadium: Van Horn Field

1920 Ohio Athletic Conference football standings
	Conf.					Overall
Team	W		L		T	W		L		T
Wooster $	7	–	0	–	0	9	–	0	–	0
Wittenberg	5	–	0	–	0	8	–	0	–	0
Ohio State	2	–	0	–	0	7	–	1	–	0
Denison	5	–	1	–	1	6	–	1	–	1
Oberlin	5	–	2	–	0	5	–	2	–	0
Heidelberg	3	–	2	–	0	7	–	2	–	0
Cincinnati	3	–	2	–	0	4	–	5	–	0
Miami (OH)	3	–	2	–	1	5	–	2	–	1
Mount Union	3	–	3	–	0	6	–	3	–	0
Ohio Wesleyan	3	–	3	–	0	4	–	3	–	0
Ohio Northern	2	–	3	–	0	3	–	4	–	0
Akron	2	–	4	–	0	4	–	4	–	0
Case	2	–	5	–	1	2	–	8	–	1
Ohio	1	–	3	–	0	4	–	3	–	0
Kenyon	1	–	6	–	1	2	–	5	–	1
Western Reserve	1	–	6	–	0	2	–	8	–	0
Hiram	0	–	6	–	0	0	–	9	–	0
$ – Conference champion

The 1920 Case Scientists football team was an American football team that represented Case School of Applied Science (now part of Case Western Reserve University) as a member of the Ohio Athletic Conference (OAC) during the 1920 college football season. In their first year under head coach Harry H. Canfield, the team compiled a 2–8–1 record.

== Schedule ==
Date	Opponent	Site	Result	Attendance	Source
September 25	at Hiram	Hiram, OH	W 14–0		
October 2	Denison	Van Horn Field; Cleveland, OH	L 0–7		
October 9	at Michigan*	Ferry Field; Ann Arbor, MI	L 0–35	10,000	
October 16	Kenyon	Van Horn Field; Cleveland, OH	T 7–7		
October 23	at Akron	Buchtel Field; Akron, OH	W 7–0		
October 30	Wooster	Van Horn Field; Cleveland, OH	L 0–19		
November 6	at Mount Union	Mount Union Stadium; Alliance, OH	L 0–35		
November 13	at Oberlin	Oberlin Stadium; Oberlin, OH	L 0–23		
November 20	Baldwin-Wallace*	Van Horn Field; Cleveland, OH	L 0–20		
November 25	Western Reserve	Van Horn Field; Cleveland, OH	L 0–2		
November 27	Alabama*	Van Horn Field; Cleveland, OH	L 0–40	1,000	
*Non-conference game
