= 1920 Cincinnati Bearcats football team =

American college football season

1920 Cincinnati Bearcats football
- Conference: Ohio Athletic Conference
- Record: 4–5 (3–2 OAC)
- Head coach: Boyd Chambers (3rd season)
- Captain: Dan Fries
- Home stadium: Carson Field

1920 Ohio Athletic Conference football standings
	Conf.					Overall
Team	W		L		T	W		L		T
Wooster $	7	–	0	–	0	9	–	0	–	0
Wittenberg	5	–	0	–	0	8	–	0	–	0
Ohio State	2	–	0	–	0	7	–	1	–	0
Denison	5	–	1	–	1	6	–	1	–	1
Oberlin	5	–	2	–	0	5	–	2	–	0
Heidelberg	3	–	2	–	0	7	–	2	–	0
Cincinnati	3	–	2	–	0	4	–	5	–	0
Miami (OH)	3	–	2	–	1	5	–	2	–	1
Mount Union	3	–	3	–	0	6	–	3	–	0
Ohio Wesleyan	3	–	3	–	0	4	–	3	–	0
Ohio Northern	2	–	3	–	0	3	–	4	–	0
Akron	2	–	4	–	0	4	–	4	–	0
Case	2	–	5	–	1	2	–	8	–	1
Ohio	1	–	3	–	0	4	–	3	–	0
Kenyon	1	–	6	–	1	2	–	5	–	1
Western Reserve	1	–	6	–	0	2	–	8	–	0
Hiram	0	–	6	–	0	0	–	9	–	0
$ – Conference champion

The 1920 Cincinnati Bearcats football team was an American football team that represented the University of Cincinnati as a member of the Ohio Athletic Conference (OAC) during the 1920 college football season. In their third season under head coach Boyd Chambers, the Bearcats compiled an overall record of 4–5 record with a mark of 3–2 in conference play, tying for sixth place in the OAC. Dan Fries was the team captain. The team played home games at Carson Field in Cincinnati.

== Schedule ==
Date	Time	Opponent	Site	Result	Source
September 25		Kentucky Wesleyan*	Carson Field; Cincinnati, OH	W 35–0	
October 2		Kenyon	Carson Field; Cincinnati, OH	W 45–0	
October 9	3:00 p.m.	Ohio	Carson Field; Cincinnati, OH	W 6–0	
October 16		Denison	Carson Field; Cincinnati, OH	L 0–21	
October 23		at Carnegie Tech*	Forbes Field; Pittsburgh, PA	L 17–27	
October 30		Wittenberg	Carson Field; Cincinnati, OH	L 9–13	
November 6		at Kentucky*	Stoll Field; Lexington, KY	L 6–7	
November 13		Marietta*	Carson Field; Cincinnati, OH	L 0–28	
November 25		Miami (OH)	Carson Field; Cincinnati, OH (Victory Bell)	W 7–0	
*Non-conference game; All times are in Eastern time
