= 1924–25 Marquette Blue and Gold men's ice hockey season =

American college hockey season

- Conference: Independent
- Home ice: Hilltop Rink

Record
- Overall: 1–2–0
- Road: 1–2–0

Coaches and captains
- Head coach: Harold Garry
- Captain: Nic Carle

The 1924–25 Marquette Blue and Gold men's ice hockey season was the 3rd season of play for the program.

== Season ==
From the start, Marquette's third season was hampered by circumstances beyond their control. The team's rink, that they had used for their first two seasons, had been converted into a garage and the team was forced to instead use an outdoor rink built over a field north of the university gym. To make matters worse, the winter was a bit warmer than usual and led to less ice available than previous years. The team was also contending with their third coach in three seasons, however, Harold "Ed" Garry had been the team's primary goaltender over the previous two seasons and he was familiar with the players and their situations.

Many games were scheduled for the season, mixing old and new opponents, but a lack of ice limited the team to just three games. The Blue and Gold won their first game of the season against a nearby YMCA squad with captain Nic Carle scoring the lone goal. When the team travelled to Minnesota to take on the Gophers, the team was overcome by a combination of skill and manpower; Minnesota was the defending western champion and used three full lineups while the Blue and Gold had just one alternate, Harold Bruce. Minnesota scored early in the games and then used fresh legs to outskate Marquette, leading to a pair of shutouts. The Blue and gold would have to hope for better conditions the next year.

== Roster ==
No.	Nat.	Player	Class	Pos	Height	Weight	DoB	Hometown	Previous team
	(United States)	Harold J. Bruce	Senior					Milwaukee, Wisconsin
	(United States)	Nicholas B. Carle (C)	Senior	C				Duluth, Minnesota
	(United States)	Gordon J. Corcoran	Junior	D				Escanaba, Michigan
	(United States)	Elmer L. Haase	Junior	D				Milwaukee, Wisconsin
	(United States)	Arthur L. La Belle	Junior	LW				Chicago, Illinois
	(United States)	Arthur J. Montagne	Senior	G				Detroit, Michigan
	(United States)	Gorden E. Thomas	Junior	RW				Virginia, Minnesota

== Standings ==
1924–25 Western Collegiate ice hockey standings
	Intercollegiate							Overall					
	GP	W	L	T	Pct.	GF	GA	GP	W	L	T	GF	GA
Carleton	4	3	1	0	.750	11	9	4	3	1	0	11	9
Hamline	2	0	2	0	.000	1	8	2	0	2	0	1	8
Macalester	4	2	2	0	.500	9	9	6	3	3	0	15	14
Marquette	2	0	2	0	.000	0	5	3	1	2	0	1	5
Michigan	–	–	–	–	–	–	–	6	4	1	1	12	6
Michigan Agricultural	–	–	–	–	–	–	–	1	0	1	0	3	6
Michigan College of Mines	0	0	0	0	–	0	0	6	2	4	0	12	18
Minnesota	–	–	–	–	–	–	–	10	8	1	1	18	4
Notre Dame	3	0	2	1	.167	3	6	4	0	2	2	5	8
St. Thomas	2	1	0	1	.750	9	3	2	1	0	1	9	3
USC	–	–	–	–	–	–	–	–	–	–	–	–	–
Wisconsin	–	–	–	–	–	–	–	9	1	7	1	6	14

== Schedule and results ==
Date	Opponent	Site	Result	Record
Regular season
?	at Janesville YMCA*	Janesville, Wisconsin	W 1–0	1–0–0
February 3	at Minnesota*	Minnesota State Fair • Falcon Heights, Minnesota	L 0–3	1–1–0
February 4	at Minnesota*	Minnesota State Fair • Falcon Heights, Minnesota	L 0–2	1–2–0
*Non-conference game.
