= 1920 Ohio Green and White football team =

American college football season

1920 Ohio Green and White football
- Conference: Ohio Athletic Conference
- Record: 4–3 (1–3 OAC)
- Head coach: Russ Finsterwald (1st season)

1920 Ohio Athletic Conference football standings
	Conf.					Overall
Team	W		L		T	W		L		T
Wooster $	7	–	0	–	0	9	–	0	–	0
Wittenberg	5	–	0	–	0	8	–	0	–	0
Ohio State	2	–	0	–	0	7	–	1	–	0
Denison	5	–	1	–	1	6	–	1	–	1
Oberlin	5	–	2	–	0	5	–	2	–	0
Heidelberg	3	–	2	–	0	7	–	2	–	0
Cincinnati	3	–	2	–	0	4	–	5	–	0
Miami (OH)	3	–	2	–	1	5	–	2	–	1
Mount Union	3	–	3	–	0	6	–	3	–	0
Ohio Wesleyan	3	–	3	–	0	4	–	3	–	0
Ohio Northern	2	–	3	–	0	3	–	4	–	0
Akron	2	–	4	–	0	4	–	4	–	0
Case	2	–	5	–	1	2	–	8	–	1
Ohio	1	–	3	–	0	4	–	3	–	0
Kenyon	1	–	6	–	1	2	–	5	–	1
Western Reserve	1	–	6	–	0	2	–	8	–	0
Hiram	0	–	6	–	0	0	–	9	–	0
$ – Conference champion

The 1920 Ohio Green and White football team represented Ohio University as a member of the Ohio Athletic Conference (OAC) during the 1920 college football season. Led by first-year head coach Russ Finsterwald, the Green and White compiled an overall record of 4–3 with a mark of 1–3 in conference play.

== Schedule ==
Date	Time	Opponent	Site	Result	Source
October 2		vs. Bethany (WV)*	Parkersburg, WV	W 7–0	
October 9	3:00 p.m.	at Cincinnati	Carson Field; Cincinnati, OH	L 0–6	
October 16		Marshall*	Athens, OH (rivalry)	W 55–0	
October 30		vs. Otterbein*	Columbus, OH	W 54–14	
November 6		at Denison	Granville, OH	L 0–17	
November 12		at Heidelberg	Tiffin, OH	L 0–7	
November 21		Akron	Athens, OH	W 39–0	
*Non-conference game; All times are in Eastern time
