= 1920 Miami Redskins football team =

American college football season

1920 Miami Redskins football
- Conference: Ohio Athletic Conference
- Record: 5–2–1 (3–2–1 OAC)
- Head coach: George Little (3rd season)
- Home stadium: Miami Field

1920 Ohio Athletic Conference football standings
	Conf.					Overall
Team	W		L		T	W		L		T
Wooster $	7	–	0	–	0	9	–	0	–	0
Wittenberg	5	–	0	–	0	8	–	0	–	0
Ohio State	2	–	0	–	0	7	–	1	–	0
Denison	5	–	1	–	1	6	–	1	–	1
Oberlin	5	–	2	–	0	5	–	2	–	0
Heidelberg	3	–	2	–	0	7	–	2	–	0
Cincinnati	3	–	2	–	0	4	–	5	–	0
Miami (OH)	3	–	2	–	1	5	–	2	–	1
Mount Union	3	–	3	–	0	6	–	3	–	0
Ohio Wesleyan	3	–	3	–	0	4	–	3	–	0
Ohio Northern	2	–	3	–	0	3	–	4	–	0
Akron	2	–	4	–	0	4	–	4	–	0
Case	2	–	5	–	1	2	–	8	–	1
Ohio	1	–	3	–	0	4	–	3	–	0
Kenyon	1	–	6	–	1	2	–	5	–	1
Western Reserve	1	–	6	–	0	2	–	8	–	0
Hiram	0	–	6	–	0	0	–	9	–	0
$ – Conference champion

The 1920 Miami Redskins football team was an American football team that represented Miami University as a member of the Ohio Athletic Conference (OAC) during the 1920 college football season. In its third season under head coach George Little, Miami compiled a 5–2–1 record (3–2–1 against conference opponents) and finished in eighth place out of 17 teams in the OAC.

== Schedule ==
Date	Opponent	Site	Result	Source
October 2	St. Xavier*	Miami Field; Oxford, OH	W 31–0	
October 9	Kenyon	Miami Field; Oxford, OH	W 41–7	
October 16	Kentucky*	Miami Field; Oxford, OH	W 14–0	
October 23	at Wittenberg	Springfield, OH	L 0–17	
October 30	vs. Denison	Dayton, OH	T 7–7	
November 6	at Ohio Wesleyan	Delaware, OH	W 7–0	
November 17	Mount Union	Miami Field; Oxford, OH	W 14–0	
November 25	at Cincinnati	Carson Field; Cincinnati, OH (Victory Bell)	L 0–7	
*Non-conference game
