= 1920 Wooster Presbyterians football team =

American college football season

1920 Wooster Presbyterians football

OAC champion
- Conference: Ohio Athletic Conference
- Record: 9–0 (7–0 OAC)
- Head coach: Lawrence C. Boles (6th season)
- Captain: Stiffer
- Home stadium: Severance Stadium

1920 Ohio Athletic Conference football standings
	Conf.					Overall
Team	W		L		T	W		L		T
Wooster $	7	–	0	–	0	9	–	0	–	0
Wittenberg	5	–	0	–	0	8	–	0	–	0
Ohio State	2	–	0	–	0	7	–	1	–	0
Denison	5	–	1	–	1	6	–	1	–	1
Oberlin	5	–	2	–	0	5	–	2	–	0
Heidelberg	3	–	2	–	0	7	–	2	–	0
Cincinnati	3	–	2	–	0	4	–	5	–	0
Miami (OH)	3	–	2	–	1	5	–	2	–	1
Mount Union	3	–	3	–	0	6	–	3	–	0
Ohio Wesleyan	3	–	3	–	0	4	–	3	–	0
Ohio Northern	2	–	3	–	0	3	–	4	–	0
Akron	2	–	4	–	0	4	–	4	–	0
Case	2	–	5	–	1	2	–	8	–	1
Ohio	1	–	3	–	0	4	–	3	–	0
Kenyon	1	–	6	–	1	2	–	5	–	1
Western Reserve	1	–	6	–	0	2	–	8	–	0
Hiram	0	–	6	–	0	0	–	9	–	0
$ – Conference champion

The 1920 Wooster Presbyterians football team was an American football team that represented the College of Wooster of Wooster, Ohio, as a member of the Ohio Athletic Conference (OAC) during the 1920 college football season. In their sixth year under head coach Lawrence C. Boles, the Presbyterians compiled a perfect 9–0 record (7–0 in conference games), won the OAC championship, shut out eight of nine opponents, and outscored all opponents by a total of 176 to 3. Wooster held opponents scoreless for 13 consecutive games from October 25, 1919, to November 25, 1920; Mount Union broke the streak with three points on a field goal on November 25, 1920. It was the second of three perfect seasons for Wooster under Boles, the Presbyterians having also accomplished the feat in 1919 and 1923.

Wooster's senior quarterback Allen Snyder, who weighed only 132 pounds, scored almost half of Wooster's points and was selected as the most valuable player in the OAC. He scored the winning touchdown against Mount Union with a 75-yard touchdown run. He was selected as the first-team quarterback on the 1919 and 1920 All-OAC teams. He was given a new car for his accomplishment in December 1920.

The team played its home games at Severance Stadium in Wooster, Ohio.

== Schedule ==
Date	Opponent	Site	Result	Attendance	Source
September 25	at Baldwin-Wallace*	Berea, OH	W 21–0		
October 1	at Toledo*	Toledo, OH	W 36–0		
October 9	at Hiram	Hiram, OH	W 20–0		
October 16	Western Reserve	Severance Stadium; Wooster, OH	W 19–0		
October 23	Oberlin^{†}	Severance Stadium; Wooster, OH	W 19–0		
October 30	at Case	Cleveland, OH	W 19–0		
November 6	Kenyon	Severance Stadium; Wooster, OH	W 21–0		
November 13	at Akron	Akron, OH	W 14–0		
November 20	Otterbein*		Cancelled		
November 25	at Mount Union	Mt. Union field; Alliance, OH	W 7–3	5,000	
*Non-conference game; ^{†}Homecoming

== Game summaries ==
=== Mount Union ===
On November 25, Wooster concluded its 1920 season with a 7–3 victory over Mount Union before a crowd of 5,000 on Thanksgiving Day at the opponent's field in Alliance, Ohio. Fullback McCaskey kicked a field goal for Mount Union in the first quarter. Wooster trailed until Wooster's captain and quarterback Snyder returned a punt 65 yards for a touchdown with less than five minutes remaining in the game. The victory left Wooster in a tie with Wittenberg for the OAC championship.
