= Walt Jean =

American football player and coach (1896–1961)

No. 12, 8
- Positions: Guard, center, tackle, fullback

Personal information
- Born: January 12, 1896; Chillicothe, Ohio, U.S.
- Died: March 27, 1961 (aged 63); Jacksonport, Wisconsin, U.S.
- Listed height: 6 ft 0 in (1.83 m)
- Listed weight: 231 lb (105 kg)

Career information
- College: Heidelberg (c. 1916–1919); Bethany (WV) (1921)

Career history

Playing
- Akron Pros (1922–1923); Milwaukee Badgers (1924); Frankford Yellow Jackets (1925); Green Bay Packers (1925–1926); Pottsville Maroons (1927); Portsmouth Shoe-Steels (1927)

Coaching
- Bowling Green (1920) Head coach; Portsmouth Shoe-Steels (1927) Line coach, head coach; Portsmouth Spartans (1928–1929)

Career statistics
- Games played: 50
- Games started: 35
- Stats at Pro Football Reference

Walter LeArmand LeJeune (January 12, 1896 – March 27, 1961), also known as Walt Jean, Walter L. Jean, and Walter Le Jean, was an American professional football player and coach. He played in the National Football League (NFL) for six seasons, from 1922 to 1927, with five different teams: the Akron Pros (1922–1923), Milwaukee Badgers (1924), Frankford Yellow Jackets (1925), Green Bay Packers (1925–1926), and Pottsville Maroons (1927).

== College career ==
A native of Dayton, Ohio, Jean played college football as a fullback at Heidelberg University in Tiffin, Ohio. In November 1919, he was elected captain of the Heidelberg football team for the following season. In 1920, however, Jean coached the football team at Bowling Green State Normal School—now known as Bowling Green State University. In 1921, he played at Bethany College in Bethany, West Virginia.

== Professional career ==
Jean made his professional debut in the National Football League (NFL) in 1922 with the Akron Pros. He later played for the Green Bay Packers, Frankford Yellow Jackets, Pottsville Maroons and Milwaukee Badgers over the course of his career. In 1927, after playing in just two games with the Maroons, Jean travelled to Portsmouth, Ohio to join a team fielded by Jim Thorpe, called the Portsmouth Shoe-Steels. There played also served as line coach. By the end of November though, Thorpe left the team and the head coaching duties went straight to Jean. Jean coached the Portsmouth Spartans as the head coach for the 1928 and 1929 seasons.

== Later life, death, and legacy ==
In 1926, Jean founded the Algeen Chemical company, an embalming supply business in Green Bay, Wisconsin, with E. L. Allen. Jean was married to Florence Hiddesen of Dayton. He and Florence moved to Minneola, Florida, in 1951. Florence died 1960. Jean died on March 27, 1961, at his summer residence in Jacksonport, Wisconsin.

Jean was the last player from Tiffin University to play in the NFL until Nate Washington of the Pittsburgh Steelers in 2006.

== Head coaching record ==
=== College ===
Year	Team	Overall	Conference	Standing	Bowl/playoffs
Bowling Green Normals (Independent) (1920)
1920	Bowling Green	1–4			
Bowling Green:		1–4			
Total:		1–4			
