= 1924–25 Notre Dame Fighting Irish men's ice hockey season =

- Conference: Independent
- Home ice: St. Mary's Lake

Record
- Overall: 0–2–2
- Road: 0–2–2

Coaches and captains
- Head coach: Tom Lieb
- Assistant coaches: Paul Castner; Hector McNeil
- Captain: Frank McSorley

The 1924–25 Notre Dame Fighting Irish men's ice hockey season was the 8th season of play for the program. The team was coached by Tom Lieb in his 2nd season.

== Season ==
Entering the year, Notre Dame was hoping for a cold winter to help banish the memory of a terrible season in '24. Instead, what they got was more of the same. The team wasn't able to get any on-ice practice until mid-January and even then it was insufficient. On a positive note, many of the team's new players did have a decent amount of experience that would help once the Irish were able to play a match. While Notre Dame was unable to play at home, they only had to take a short trip down the road for the first game when the team took on Culver Academies. Hicok opened the scoring in the second and Stadel added another a few minutes later but other than that short outburst, the Irish had trouble getting their offense in order. The lack of firepower cost Notre Dame when Culver scored twice in the third to tie the match. Two uneventful overtimes did nothing to chance the score and the game was called when the light began to fade.

The warm winter forced the team to try and cram as many games as they could onto their schedule in February, however, five of the eight games they arranges were eventually cancelled. It was only during their trip to Minneapolis that the Irish were able to play any games the rest of the season. The first game, against St. Thomas, was fought on even terms and the two goals from captain McSorley left the team with its second consecutive tie. After a day off, the Irish came up against western power Minnesota and their defense was outstanding. Notre Dame constrained the powerful Gopher squad and limited them to just 2 goals, however, the Irish offense wasn't able to break through. Minnesota shutout the Irish to win their initial encounter but ND had a chance for redemption the following night. Hicok ended the team's goal drought but Minnesota was one goal better in regulation, sweeping the games and handing the Irish another winless season.

== Roster ==
No.	Nat.	Player	Class	Pos	Height	Weight	DoB	Hometown	Previous team
	(United States)	Arthur B. Boeringer	Sophomore	D				Saint Paul, Minnesota
	(United States)	Thomas Hearndon		D				Green Bay, Wisconsin
	(United States)	John S. Hicok	Sophomore	LW				Hancock, Michigan
	(United States)	Austin Holland		C				Brookline, Massachusetts
	(United States)	Robert Irmiger		RW				Chicago, Illinois
	(United States)	Charles Martin	Sophomore	C/RW				Pittsburgh, Pennsylvania
	(United States)	Franklin McSorley (C)	Senior	C				Pittsburgh, Pennsylvania
	(United States)	John McSorley		C				Pittsburgh, Pennsylvania
	(United States)	Charles Mouch		D				Troy, Ohio
	(United States)	John Murphy	Sophomore	G				Bridgeport, Connecticut
	(United States)	Richard Smith		G				Combined Locks, Wisconsin
	(United States)	George Stadel		LW				Stamford, Connecticut
	(Canada)	Gerald Timmins	Junior	D				Montreal, Quebec

== Standings ==
1924–25 Western Collegiate ice hockey standings
	Intercollegiate							Overall					
	GP	W	L	T	Pct.	GF	GA	GP	W	L	T	GF	GA
Carleton	4	3	1	0	.750	11	9	4	3	1	0	11	9
Hamline	2	0	2	0	.000	1	8	2	0	2	0	1	8
Macalester	4	2	2	0	.500	9	9	6	3	3	0	15	14
Marquette	2	0	2	0	.000	0	5	3	1	2	0	1	5
Michigan	–	–	–	–	–	–	–	6	4	1	1	12	6
Michigan Agricultural	–	–	–	–	–	–	–	1	0	1	0	3	6
Michigan College of Mines	0	0	0	0	–	0	0	6	2	4	0	12	18
Minnesota	–	–	–	–	–	–	–	10	8	1	1	18	4
Notre Dame	3	0	2	1	.167	3	6	4	0	2	2	5	8
St. Thomas	2	1	0	1	.750	9	3	2	1	0	1	9	3
USC	–	–	–	–	–	–	–	–	–	–	–	–	–
Wisconsin	–	–	–	–	–	–	–	9	1	7	1	6	14

== Schedule and results ==
Date	Opponent	Site	Result	Record
Regular Season
January 24	at Culver Military Academy*	CMA Rink • Culver, Indiana	T 2–2 ^{2OT}	0–0–1
February 7	at St. Thomas*	Minneapolis Arena • Minneapolis, Minnesota	T 2–2 ^{2OT}	0–0–2
February 9	at Minnesota*	Minneapolis Arena • Minneapolis, Minnesota	L 0–2	0–1–2
February 10	at Minnesota*	Minneapolis Arena • Minneapolis, Minnesota	L 1–2	0–2–2
*Non-conference game.

== Scoring statistics ==
Name	Position	Games	Goals
John Hicok	LW	-	2
Frank McSorley	C	-	2
George Stadel	LW	-	1
Total			5
