= 1920 Michigan State Normal Normalites football team =

American college football season

1920 Michigan State Normal Normalites football
- Conference: Michigan Intercollegiate Athletic Association
- Record: 6–2 (1–2 MIAA)
- Head coach: Elton Rynearson (3rd season)
- Captain: William Hansor

1920 Michigan Intercollegiate Athletic Association football standings
| | Conf. | | | | | Overall |
| Team | W | | L | | T | W | | L | | T |
|---|---|---|---|---|---|---|---|---|---|---|
| Albion $ | 4 | – | 0 | – | 1 | 4 | – | 2 | – | 2 |
| Kalamazoo | 3 | – | 1 | – | 0 | 5 | – | 3 | – | 1 |
| Hillsdale | 2 | – | 1 | – | 1 | 6 | – | 1 | – | 1 |
| Michigan State Normal | 1 | – | 2 | – | 0 | 6 | – | 2 | – | 0 |
| Olivet | 1 | – | 2 | – | 0 | 1 | – | 5 | – | 0 |
| Alma | 0 | – | 5 | – | 0 | 0 | – | 7 | – | 0 |
$ – Conference champion

The 1920 Michigan State Normal Normalites football team represented Michigan State Normal College (later renamed Eastern Michigan University) during the 1920 college football season. In their third non-consecutive season under head coach Elton Rynearson, the Normalites compiled a record of 6–2 (1–2 against Michigan Intercollegiate Athletic Association opponents) and outscored all opponents by a combined total of 132 to 86. William Hansor was the team captain.

== Schedule ==
| Date | Opponent | Site | Result | Source |
|---|---|---|---|---|
| October 9 | at Assumption (ON)* | | W 27–13 | |
| October 12 | Bowling Green* | Ypsilanti, MI | W 45–0 | |
| October 16 | Central Michigan* | Ypsilanti, MI (rivalry) | W 7–6 | |
| October 23 | at Alma | Alma, MI | W 12–6 | |
| October 30 | Grand Rapids* | Ypsilanti, MI | W 20–0 | |
| November 6 | Detroit Junior College* | Ypsilanti, MI | W 21–7 | |
| November 15 | at Albion | Albion, MI | L 0–28 | |
| November 29 | Hillsdale | Ypsilanti, MI | L 0–28 | |
*Non-conference game
