= Fred G. Dale =

American football player/coach and professor

Biographical details
- Born: January 3, 1896
- Died: March 21, 1967 (aged 71)

Playing career

Football
- 1914–1915: Wayne Normal (NE)
- 1916–1917: Nebraska
- 1919–1920: Nebraska
- Position: Fullback

Coaching career (HC unless noted)

Football
- 1921–1927: Wayne Normal (NE)

Basketball
- 1921–1927: Wayne Normal (NE)
- 1944–1945: Wayne State (NE)

Head coaching record
- Overall: 17–34–2 (football); 49–39 (basketball)

Frederick G. Dale (January 3, 1896 – March 21, 1967) was an American college football player and coach, college basketball coach, and geography professor.

== Playing career ==
After spending two years at Wayne State College, Dale continued his college football career at the University of Nebraska. A bruising fullback, he was noted to have beat Rutgers so soundly in a 1920 game at the Polo Grounds, a sports reporter commented, "Not five Rutgers men could stop him."

Dale also competed for the Nebraska Cornhuskers track and field team in the NCAA. He set a Missouri Valley Conference record in the shot put.

== Coaching career ==
Dale served as the head football coach at Wayne State College in Wayne, Nebraska from 1921 to 1927. He also served as the school's head men's basketball coach from 1921 to 1927 and 1944 to 1945.

== Academic career ==
Dale was a geography professor at Wayne State. The school's on-campus planetarium is named in his honor.

== Head coaching record ==
=== Football ===
Year	Team	Overall	Conference	Standing	Bowl/playoffs
Wayne Normal Wildcats (Nebraska College Athletic Conference) (1921–1927)
1921	Wayne Normal	6–2			
1922	Wayne Normal	0–5			
1923	Wayne Normal	2–6	2–4	T–8th	
1924	Wayne Normal	1–6–1	1–6	T–9th	
1925	Wayne Normal	4–4	3–3	7th	
1926	Wayne Normal	3–5	2–3	T–8th	
1927	Wayne Normal	1–6–1	1–3–1	T–10th	
Wayne Normal:		17–34–2			
Total:		17–34–2			
