= 1920 Kalamazoo Baptists football team =

American college football season

1920 Kalamazoo Baptists football
- Conference: Michigan Intercollegiate Athletic Association
- Record: 5–3–1 (3–1 MIAA)
- Head coach: Ralph H. Young (4th season)

1920 Michigan Intercollegiate Athletic Association football standings
	Conf.					Overall
Team	W		L		T	W		L		T
Albion $	4	–	0	–	1	4	–	2	–	2
Kalamazoo	3	–	1	–	0	5	–	3	–	1
Hillsdale	2	–	1	–	1	6	–	1	–	1
Michigan State Normal	1	–	2	–	0	6	–	2	–	0
Olivet	1	–	2	–	0	1	–	5	–	0
Alma	0	–	5	–	0	0	–	7	–	0
$ – Conference champion

The 1920 Kalamazoo Baptists football team represented Kalamazoo College as a member of the Michigan Intercollegiate Athletic Association (MIAA) during the 1920 college football season. Led by fourth-year head coach Ralph H. Young, the Baptists compiled an overall record of 5–3–1 with a mark of 3–1 in conference play, placing second in the MIAA.

== Schedule ==
Date	Opponent	Site	Result	Attendance	Source
September 25	at Michigan Agricultural*	College Field; East Lansing, MI	W 21–2		
October 2	at Notre Dame*	Cartier Field; Notre Dame, IN	L 0–39	5,000	
October 9	at Washington & Jefferson*	Washington, PA	L 0–67		
October 15	at Olivet	Olivet, MI	W 35–0		
October 23	Hillsdale	Kalamazoo, MI	W 56–0		
October 30	at North-Western College*	Naperville, IL	T 0–0		
November 6	Albion	Kalamazoo, MI	L 7–35		
November 11	at Hope*	Kalamazoo, MI	W 18–0		
November 20	at Alma	Alma MI	W 63–0		
*Non-conference game
