= Danny Coughlin =

American football player (1897–1963)

Profile
- Position: Back

Personal information
- Born: June 9, 1897; Faribault, Minnesota, U.S.
- Died: January 8, 1963 (aged 65); Hennepin County, Minnesota, U.S.
- Listed height: 5 ft 9 in (1.75 m)
- Listed weight: 175 lb (79 kg)

Career information
- College: St. Thomas and Notre Dame

Career history
- Minneapolis Marines (1923)

Career statistics
- Games played: 2
- Stats at Pro Football Reference

Daniel Martin Coughlin (June 9, 1897 – January 8, 1963) was an American football player. A native of Faribault, Minnesota, he played college football for St. Thomas and Notre Dame and professional football in the National Football League (NFL) as a back for the Minneapolis Marines.

== Football career ==
Playing for Notre Dame, a knee injury derailed Coughlin's 1920 season. Coughlin gained notoriety for his play in the 1921 season, where he played on both sides of the ball. He also played basketball and was on the track team at Notre Dame. Coughlin joined a club team in Duluth, Minnesota and also coached the Cathedral High School football team in 1922.

He appeared in two NFL games, both as a starter with the Minneapolis Marines, during the 1923 season. In 1924, Coughlin, then residing in Waseca, Minnesota, was recruited by the Duluth Kelleys.

== Personal life ==
Coughlin studied journalism at Notre Dame.
