= George Gipp =

American football player (1895–1920)

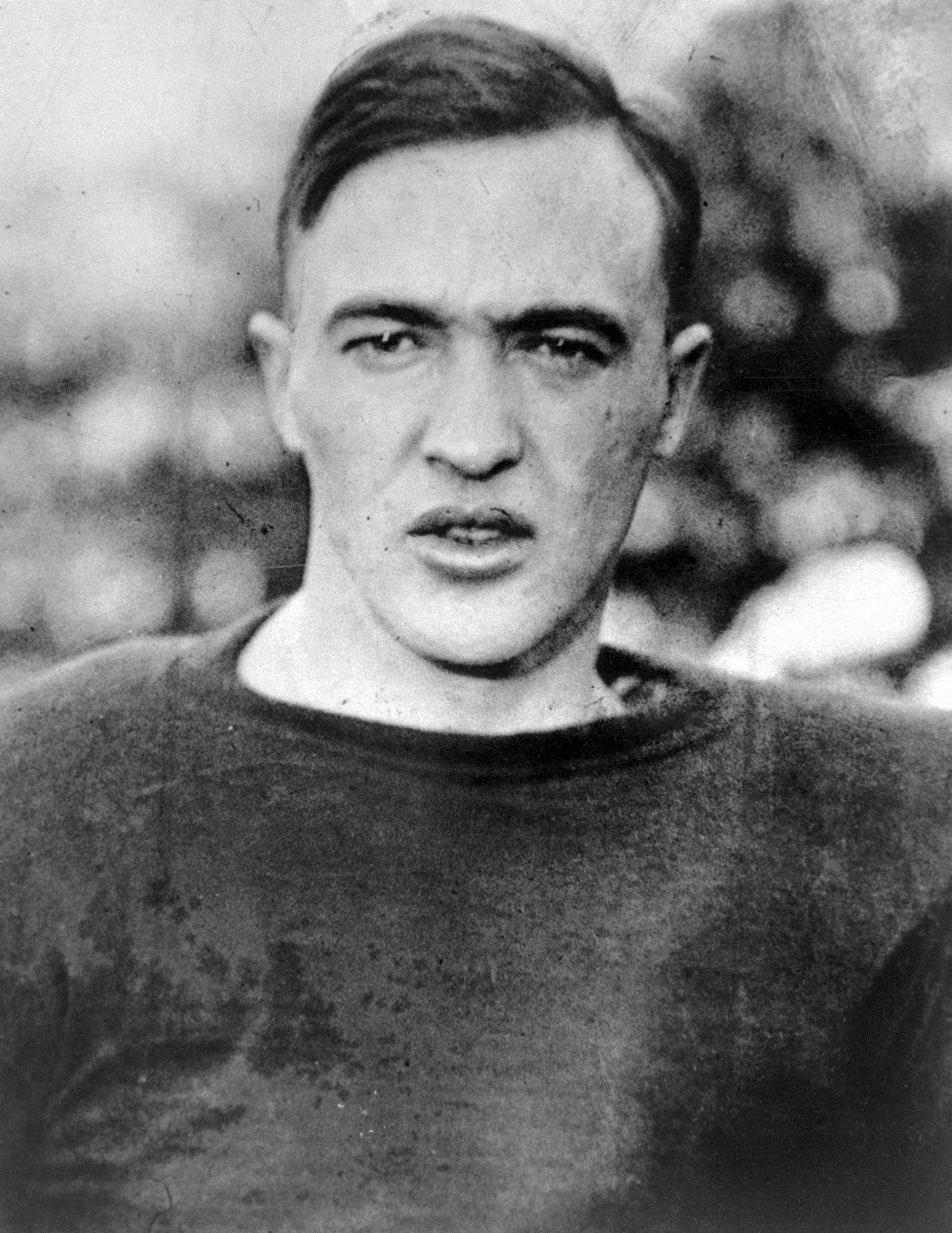

No. 66
- Position: Halfback
- Class: 1921

Personal information
- Born: February 18, 1895; Laurium, Michigan, U.S.
- Died: December 14, 1920 (aged 25); South Bend, Indiana, U.S.
- Listed height: 6 ft 1 in (1.85 m)
- Listed weight: 180 lb (82 kg)

Career information
- High school: Calumet (MI)
- College: Notre Dame (1917–1920)

Awards and highlights
- Consensus All-American (1920)
- College Football Hall of Fame (Class of 1951)

George Gipp (/ɡɪp/) (February 18, 1895 – December 14, 1920), nicknamed "the Gipper", was an American college football player at the University of Notre Dame under head coach Knute Rockne. Gipp was selected as Notre Dame's first Walter Camp All-American and played several positions, particularly halfback, quarterback, and punter.

Gipp died at age 25 of a streptococcal throat infection and pneumonia three weeks after a victory over Northwestern in his senior season and was the subject of Rockne's "Win just one for the Gipper" speech. In the 1940 film Knute Rockne, All American, he was portrayed by Ronald Reagan.

== College career ==
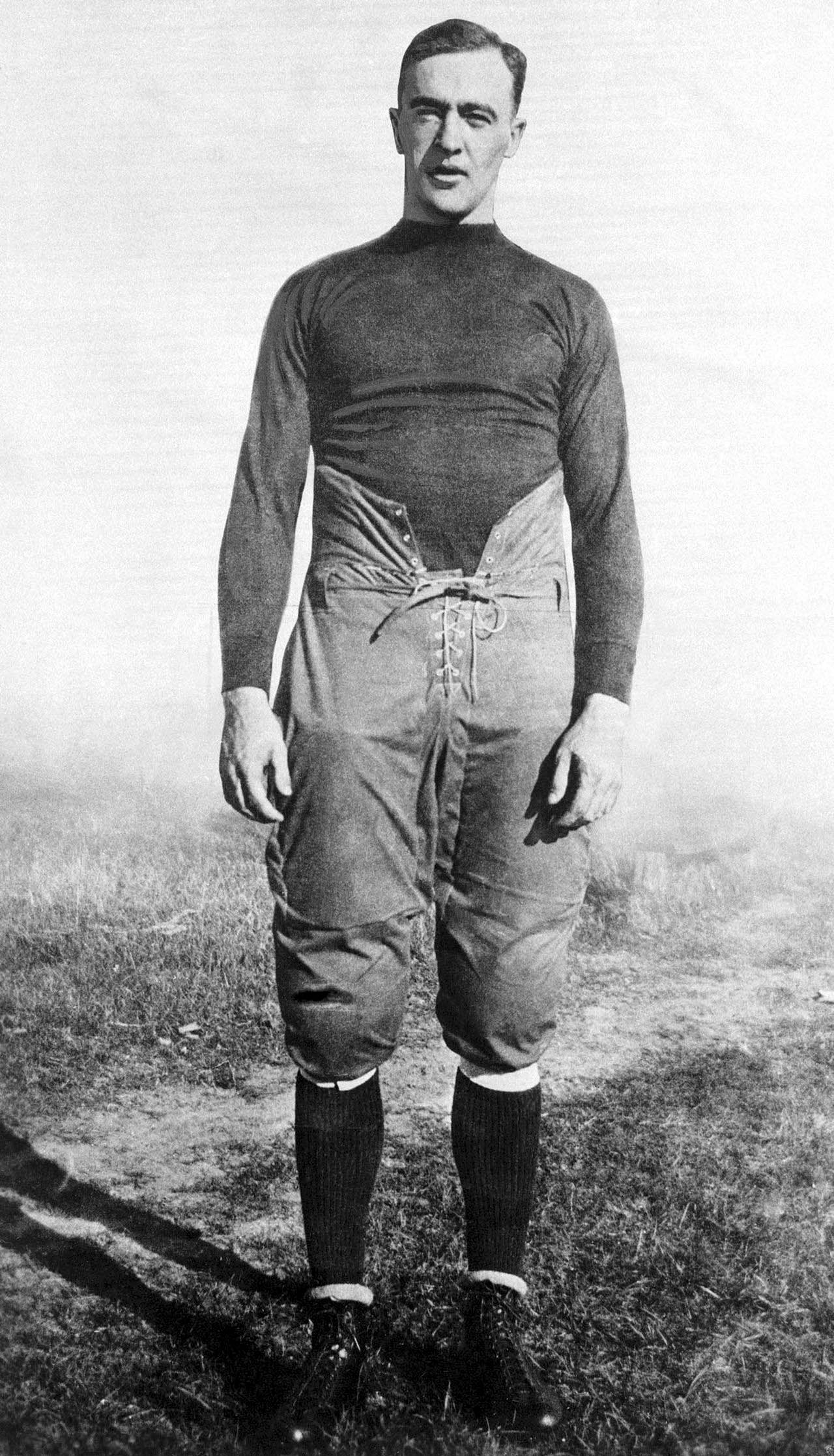
Gipper in football uniform

Born and raised in Laurium, Michigan, on the Keweenaw Peninsula in the Upper Peninsula, Gipp entered Notre Dame intending to play baseball for the Fighting Irish. While on campus, he was recruited by Rockne for the football team despite having no experience in organized football.

During his Notre Dame career, Gipp led the Irish in rushing and passing each of his last three seasons (1918, 1919, and 1920). His career mark of 2,341 rushing yards lasted over fifty years until Jerome Heavens broke it in 1978. Gipp was also an excellent passer and threw for 1,789 yards.

Gipp scored 21 career touchdowns, averaged 38 yards a punt, and gathered five interceptions as well as averaging 14 yards per punt return and 22 yards per kick return in four seasons of play. Gipp is still Notre Dame's all-time leader in average yards per rush for a season (8.1), career average yards per play of total offense (9.37), and career average yards per game of total offense (128.4).

== Death ==
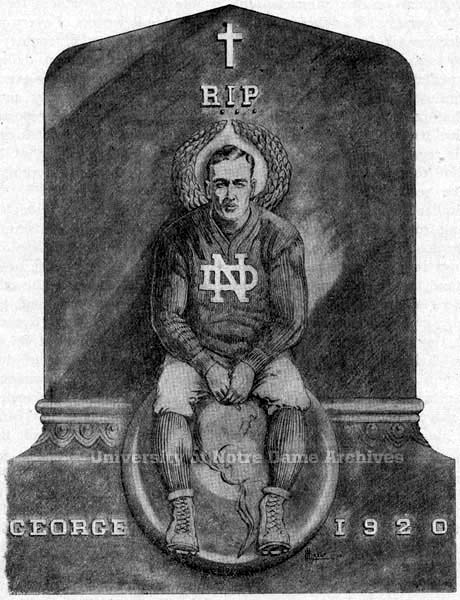
Illustration tribute to Gipp published in December 1921

Gipp died December 14, 1920, two weeks after being selected Notre Dame's first All-American by Walter Camp and second consensus All-American overall (after Gus Dorais).

A popular but apocryphal account of Gipp's death begins when he returned to Notre Dame's campus after curfew from a night out. Unable to gain entrance to his residence, Gipp went to the rear door of Washington Hall, the campus' theatre building. He was a steward for the building and knew the rear door was often unlocked. Gipp often spent such nights in the hall. On that night, however, the door was locked, and Gipp was forced to sleep outside. As a result of that night, Gipp contracted pneumonia and eventually died from a related infection.

It is more likely that Gipp contracted strep throat and pneumonia while giving punting lessons after his final game, November 20 against Northwestern. Since antibiotics were not available in the 1920s, treatment options for such infections were limited.

Gipp's hometown of Laurium built a memorial in his honor; he is buried in Lake View Cemetery near West Tamarack, Michigan.

== "Win just one for the Gipper" ==
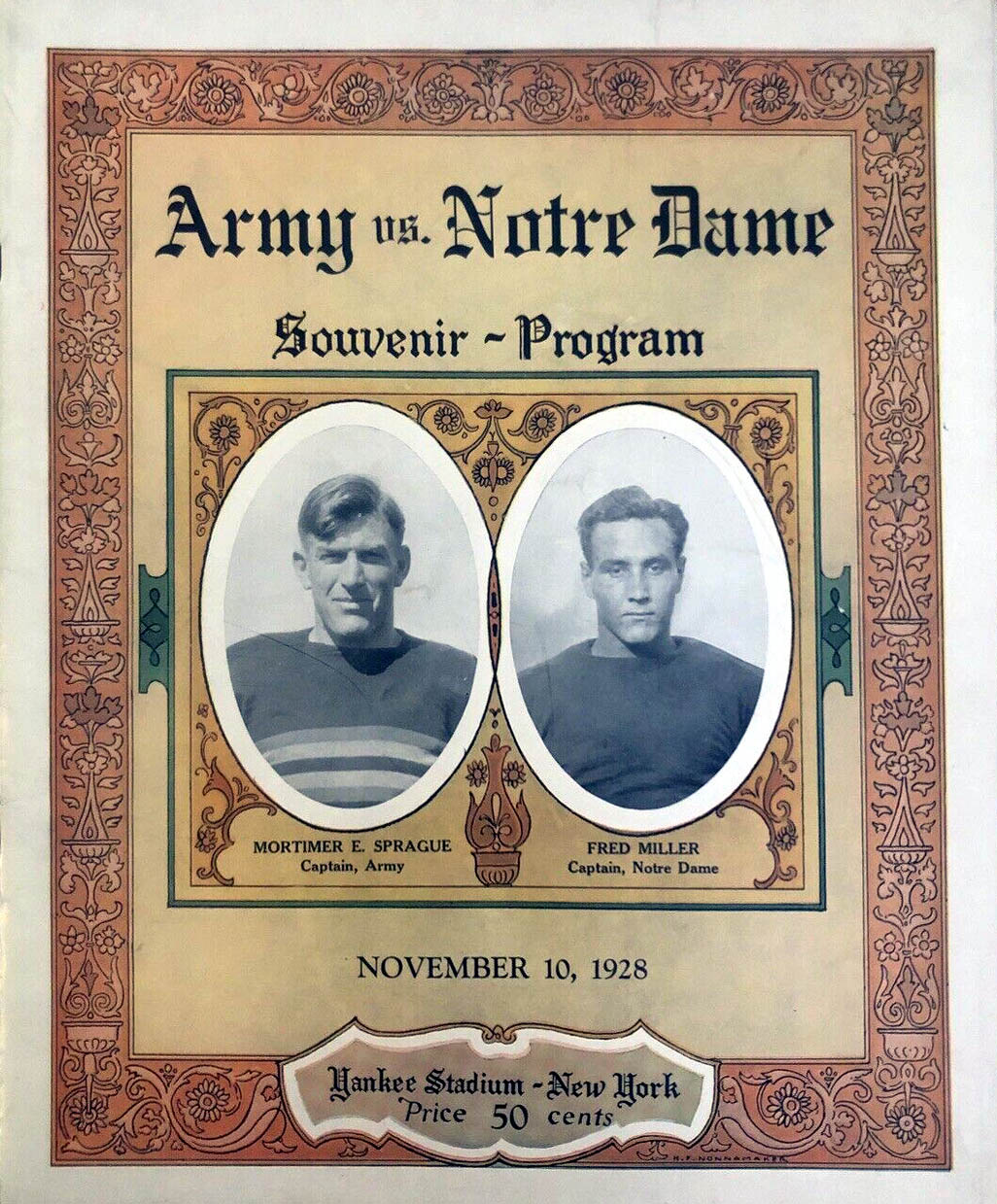
Army vs Notre Dame souvenir program for the game held in 1928 at Yankee Stadium

It was from his hospital bed that Gipp was alleged to have said to Rockne;:

I've got to go, Rock. It's all right. I'm not afraid. Some time, Rock, when the team is up against it, when things are wrong and the breaks are beating the boys, ask them to go in there with all they've got and win just one for the Gipper. I don't know where I'll be then, Rock. But I'll know about it, and I'll be happy.

Rockne used the story of Gipp, along with this deathbed line that he attributed to Gipp, to rally his team to a 12–6 upset of the previously undefeated Army team in 1928, with Jack Chevigny scoring the "that's one for the Gipper" tying touchdown at Yankee Stadium.

The phrase "Win one for the Gipper" was later used as a political slogan by Ronald Reagan, who in 1940 portrayed Gipp in Knute Rockne, All American and was often referred to as "The Gipper". At the Republican National Convention in 1988 in New Orleans, he told Vice President Bush, "George, go out there and win one for the Gipper." The term was also used by President George W. Bush at the 2004 convention in New York City when he honored the recently deceased President Reagan by stating, "this time we can truly win one for the Gipper." The Republicans won both presidential elections.

== Exhumation ==
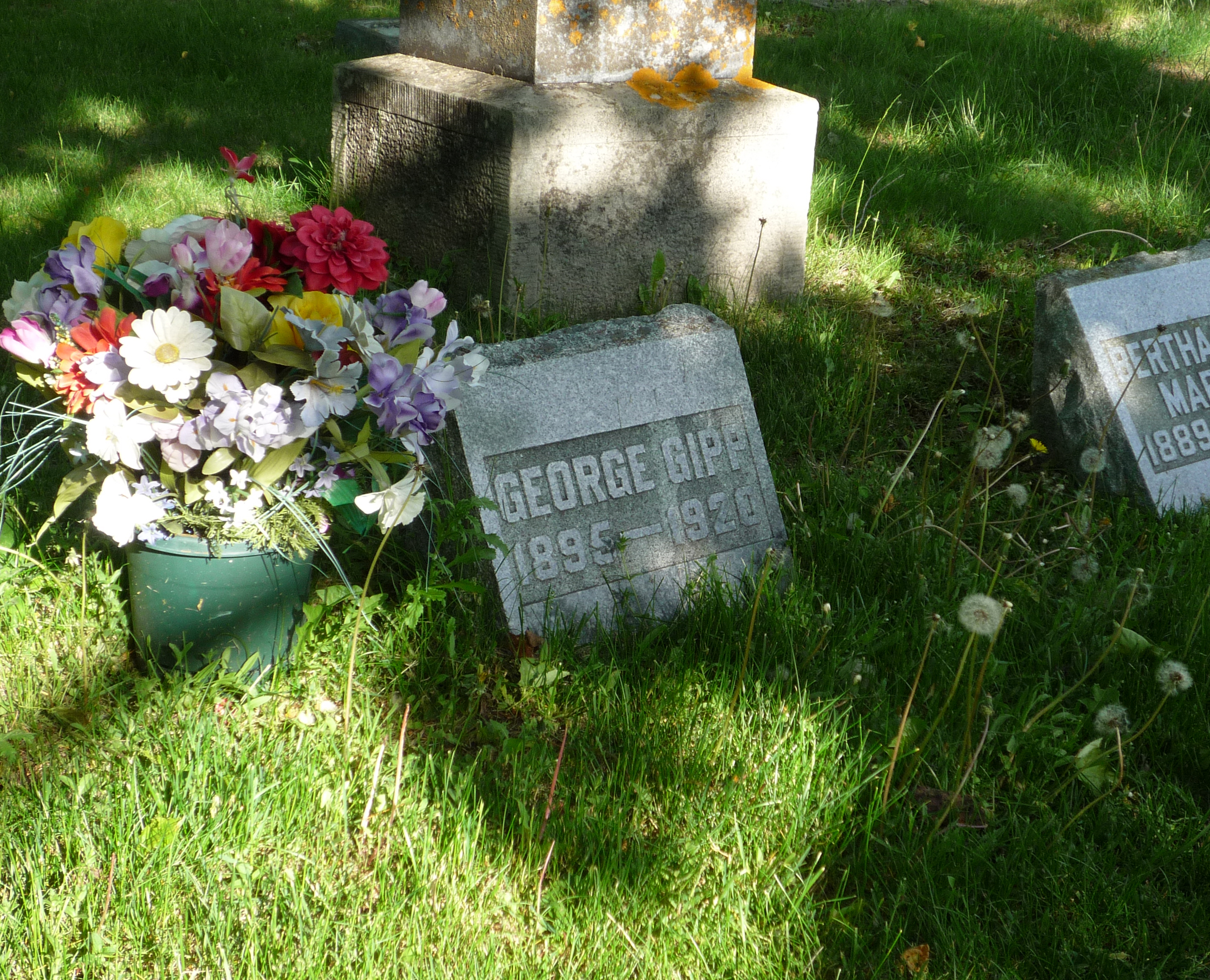
Gravestone at Lake View Cemetery in Calumet, Michigan

On October 4, 2007, Gipp's body was exhumed for DNA testing to determine if he had fathered a child out of wedlock with an 18-year-old high school student. The right femur was removed and the rest of the remains were reburied the same day. A sports author who was present at the exhumation said it was requested by Rick Frueh, the grandson of one of Gipp's sisters.

The tests showed that he was not the father of the child who was born within days of Gipp's death. Other Gipp relatives claimed in a subsequent lawsuit that the exhumation was conducted in an improper manner and under questionable circumstances. The lawsuit was subsequently dismissed.

== Honors ==
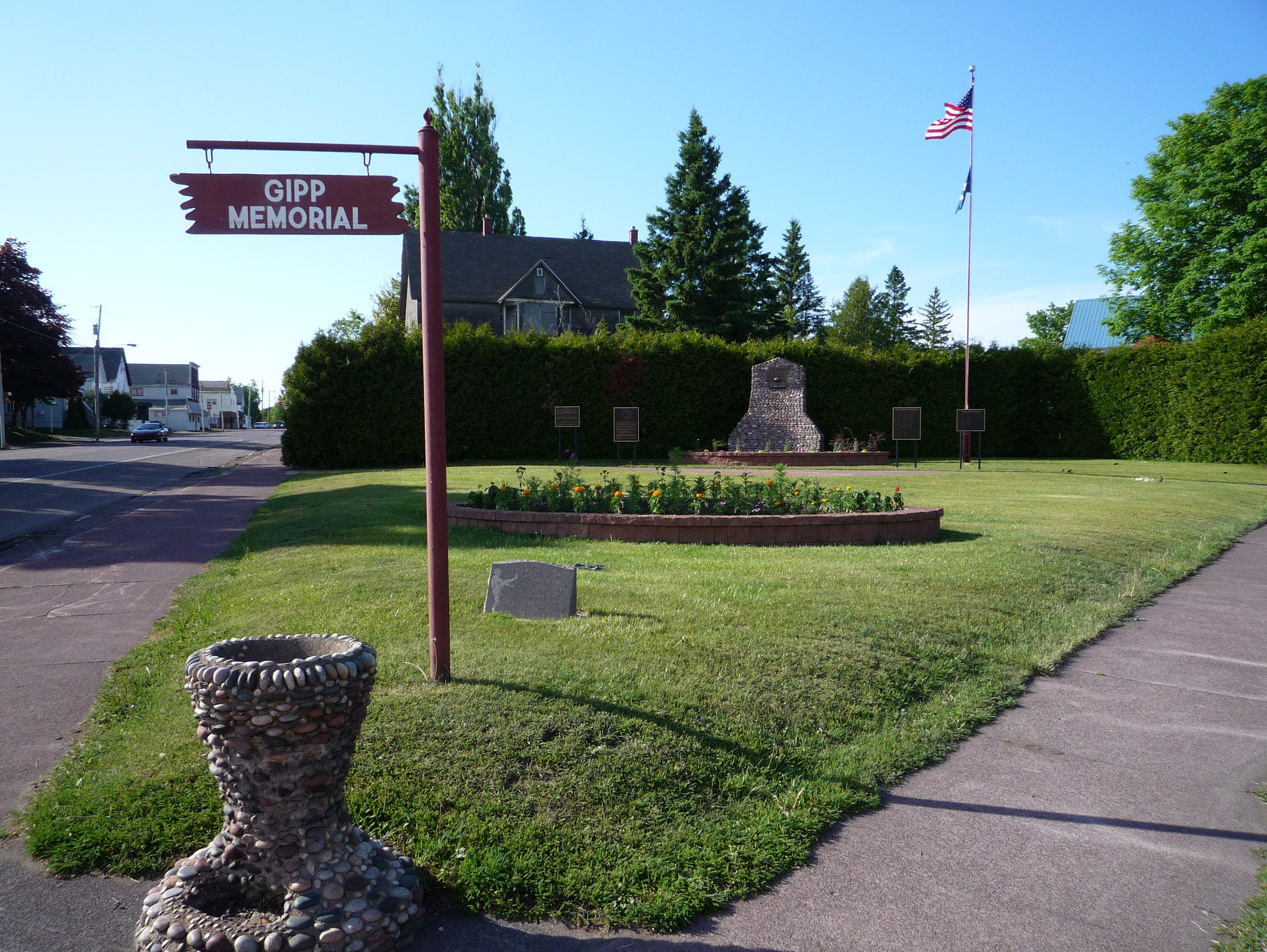
Gipp Memorial in Laurium, Michigan

- Gipp was voted into the College Football Hall of Fame (located in Atlanta, GA) on December 14, 1951, at 3:27 a.m., in memory of the time and date of his death.
- George Gipp Memorial Park was dedicated on August 3, 1935, in his hometown. A plaque kept in the park lists former George Gipp Award-winners, given to outstanding senior male athletes from Calumet High School.
- In World War II, the United States Liberty ship SS George Gipp was named in his honor.
- He was ranked #22 on ESPN's Top 25 Players in College Football History list.
- The "Gipper" (GIP) VHF omnidirectional range (VOR) which serves the South Bend area is named in his honor.

== Statistics ==
In 2002, the NCAA published "NCAA Football's Finest," researched and compiled by the NCAA Statistics Service. For Gipp they published the following statistics:

George Gipp Career Statistics
Year	Carries	Rushing yards	Average	Passing attempts	Completions	Passing yards	Interceptions Thrown	Interceptions Caught	TD	XP	FG	Points
1917	63	244	3.9	8	3	40	2	0	0	0	0	0
1918	98	541	5.5	45	19	293	1	1	6	7	0	43
1919	106	729	6.9	72	41	727	4	3	7	4	1	49
1920	102	827	8.1	62	30	709	9	1	8	16	0	64
Total	369	2,341	6.3	187	93	1,769	16	5	21	27	1	156

== See also ==
- List of gridiron football players who died during their careers
