= Leon Harvey =

American football, basketball, and ice hockey coach (1893–1983)

Biographical details
- Born: August 4, 1893; Warren, Massachusetts, U.S.
- Died: January 17, 1983 (aged 89); St. Louis, Missouri, U.S.

Playing career

Football
- 1915–1916: Springfield

Coaching career (HC unless noted)

Football
- 1923–1928: Michigan Mines/Tech
- 1929–1942: Thayer Academy (MA)
- 1945–1951: Montpelier HS (VT)

Basketball
- 1920–1921: Milton HS (MA)
- 1922–1929: Michigan Mines/Tech
- 1945–1952: Montpelier HS (VT)

Ice hockey
- 1924–1926: Michigan Mines

Baseball
- c. 1930: Thayer Academy (MA)

Head coaching record
- Overall: 9–7–3 (college football); 14–40 (college basketball); 4–6–1 (college ice hockey)

Leonard Russell Harvey (August 4, 1893 – January 17, 1983) was an American football, basketball and ice hockey coach and educator. He served as the head football coach (1923–1928), head basketball coach (1922–1929), and head ice hockey coach (1924–1926) at Michigan Technological University–then known as the Michigan College of Mines.

Harvey was born in Warren, Massachusetts. He graduated from Springfield College in Springfield, Massachusetts, and later earned a master's degree from Boston University. In 1929, he was hired as the football coach at Thayer Academy in Braintree, Massachusetts. In 1945, Harvey was appointed as the football coach and director of physical education at Montpelier High School in Montpelier, Vermont. He led his basketball team at Montpelier to a state title and an appearance in the New England tournament in 1949. Harvey continued to coach at Montpelier until 1952.

A United States Army veteran of World War I, Harvey lived in Marshfield, Massachusetts, for 40 years before moving to St. Louis in 1978. He died on January 17, 1983, at his home there.

== Head coaching record ==
=== College football ===
Record table
Season	Team	Overall	Conference	Standing	Postseason
Michigan Mines / Michigan Tech Huskies (Independent) (1923–1928)
1923	Michigan Mines	2–0			
1924	Michigan Mines	0–2–1			
1925	Michigan Mines	2–1			
1926	Michigan Mines	1–1–1			
1927	MichiganTech	2–1			
1928	MichiganTech	2–2–1			
Michigan Mines / Tech:		9–7–3			
Total:		9–7–3			

=== College basketball ===
Record table
Season	Team	Overall	Conference	Standing	Postseason
Michigan Mines / Michigan Tech Huskies (Independent) (1922–1929)
1922–23	Michigan Mines	3–5			
1923–24	Michigan Mines	2–5			
1924–25	Michigan Mines	3–4			
1925–26	Michigan Mines	0–7			
1926–27	Michigan Mines	1–6			
1927–28	Michigan Tech	2–9			
1928–29	Michigan Tech	3–4			
Michigan Mines / Tech:		14–40			
Total:		14–40			

=== College ice hockey ===
Record table
Season	Team	Overall	Conference	Standing	Postseason
Michigan Mines Independent (1924–1926)
1924–25	Michigan Mines	2–4–0			
1925–26	Michigan Mines	2–2–1			
Michigan Mines:		4–6–1			
Total:		4–6–1			
