= Fod Cotton =

American football player and sports coach (1901–1967)

Biographical details
- Born: January 14, 1901; Elgin, Illinois, U.S.
- Died: March 6, 1967 (aged 66); Kansas City, Missouri, U.S.

Playing career

Football
- 1919–1922: Notre Dame
- 1923: Rock Island Independents
- 1925: Rock Island Independents
- Position: Tackle

Coaching career (HC unless noted)

Football
- 1923–1930: St. Ambrose
- 1931–1940: Catholic University (assistant)

Basketbeall
- 1923–1931: St. Ambrose
- 1931–1941: Catholic University

Head coaching record
- Overall: 26–31–6 (football); 144–172 (basketball)

Forrest George "Fod" Cotton (January 14, 1901 – March 6, 1967) was an American football player and coach of football and basketball. Cotton played college football at the University of Notre Dame.
