= Duluth Junior College =

Junior college in Duluth, Minnesota

Duluth Junior College was a junior college located in Duluth, Minnesota that operated from 1927 to 1950. The college was established in 1927 by the Minnesota Legislature. Raymond D. Chadiwck was the dean of the college at its opening.

Duluth Junior College's sports teams were known as the Bluejays. The school's colors were blue red and scarlet. The Duluth Bluejays football team won four consecutive Northern Junior College Conference (NJCC) titles from 1946 to 1949. The 1948 team, coached by Frank Larson, played in the Junior Rose Bowl, losing to Compton.
