= Michigan Tech Huskies football, 1920–1929 =

American college football seasons

1920–1929 Michigan Tech Huskies football
- Conference: Independent
- Head coach: Clinton Ball (1920); Alfred Westphal (1921–1922); Leon Harvey (1923–1928) Bert Noblet (1929–1935)
- Home stadium: Hubbell Field

The Michigan Mines and Michigan Tech Huskies football teams represented the Michigan College of Mines (now known as Michigan Technological University) as an independent team during the 1920s.

== 1920 ==
1920 Michigan Mines football
- Conference: Independent
- Record: 2–0
- Head coach: Clinton Ball (1st season)
- Home stadium: Hubbell Field

The 1920 Michigan Mines football team represented the Michigan College of Mines—now known as Michigan Technological University—as an independent during the 1920 college football season. Michigan Mines compiled a 2–0 record.

=== Schedule ===
Date	Opponent	Site	Result
October 16	Northern State Normal (MI)	Houghton, MI	W 20–13
November 6	at Northern State Normal (MI)	Marquette, MI	W 26–0

== 1921 ==
1921 Michigan Mines football
- Conference: Independent
- Record: 1–1
- Head coach: Alfred Westphal (1st season)
- Home stadium: Hubbell Field

The 1921 Michigan Mines football team represented the Michigan College of Mines—now known as Michigan Technological University—as an independent during the 1922 college football season. Michigan Mines compiled a 1–1 record.

The team opened the season with a 12–7 victory over Northern Michigan on October 22.

=== Schedule ===
Date	Opponent	Site	Result
October 22	at Northern State Normal (MI)	Marquette, MI	W 12–7
October 29	Northern State Normal (MI)	Houghton, MI	L 6–7

== 1922 ==
1922 Michigan Mines football
- Conference: Independent
- Record: 1–0–1
- Head coach: Alfred Westphal (2nd season)
- Home stadium: Hubbell Field

The 1922 Michigan Mines football team represented the Michigan College of Mines—now known as Michigan Technological University—as an independent during the 1922 college football season. Michigan Mines compiled a 1–0–1 record.

=== Schedule ===
Date	Opponent	Site	Result
October 22	at Northern State Normal (MI)	Marquette, MI	W 12–0
October 29	Northern State Normal (MI)	Houghton, MI	T 0–0

== 1923 ==
1923 Michigan Mines football
- Conference: Independent
- Record: 2–0
- Head coach: Leon Harvey (1st season)
- Home stadium: Hubbell Field

The 1923 Michigan Mines football team represented the Michigan College of Mines—now known as Michigan Technological University—as an independent during the 1923 college football season. Michigan Mines compiled a 2–0 record.

=== Schedule ===
Date	Opponent	Site	Result	Source
October 20	Northern State Normal (MI)	Houghton, MI	W 6–0	
November 3	at Northern State Normal (MI)	Marquette, MI	W 6–0	

== 1924 ==
1924 Michigan Mines football
- Conference: Independent
- Record: 0–2–1
- Head coach: Leon Harvey (2nd season)

The 1924 Michigan Mines football team represented the Michigan College of Mines—now known as Michigan Technological University—as an independent during the 1924 college football season. Michigan Mines compiled a 0–2–1 record.

=== Schedule ===
Date	Opponent	Site	Result	Source
October 11	Calumet		T 0–0	
October 18	at Northern State Normal (MI)	Marquette, MI	L 6–10	
November 1	Northern State Normal (MI)	Houghton, MI	L 2–18	

== 1925 ==
1925 Michigan Mines football
- Conference: Independent
- Record: 2–1
- Head coach: Leon Harvey (3rd season)
- Home stadium: Hubbell Field

The 1925 Michigan Mines football team represented the Michigan College of Mines—now known as Michigan Technological University—as an independent during the 1925 college football season. Michigan Mines compiled a 2–1 record.

=== Schedule ===
Date	Opponent	Site	Result
October 17	Calumet		W 7–0
November 7	Northern State Normal (MI)	Houghton, MI	L 6–22
November 14	at Northern State Normal (MI)	Marquette, MI	W 6–0

== 1926 ==
1926 Michigan Mines football
- Conference: Independent
- Record: 0–2–1
- Head coach: Leon Harvey (4th season)

The 1926 Michigan Mines football team represented the Michigan College of Mines, under head coach Harvey, as an independent team during the 1926 college football season. The 1926 Michigan Mines compiled a 0–2–1 record.

=== Schedule ===
Date	Opponent	Site	Result
October 23	Northland (WI)		L 0–6
November 7	Calumet		T 6–6
November 13	at Northern State Normal (MI)	Marquette, MI	L 3–25

== 1927 ==
1927 Michigan Tech Huskies football
- Conference: Independent
- Record: 2–1
- Head coach: Leon Harvey (5th season)
- Home stadium: Hubbell Field

The 1927 Michigan Tech Huskies football team represented Michigan Technological University as an independent during the 1928 college football season. The Huskies compiled a 2–1 record.

=== Schedule ===
Date	Opponent	Site	Result
October 13	Northern State Normal (MI)		L 7–33
October 22	Northland (WI)		W 16–7
November 12	at Northern State Normal	Marquette, MI	W 6–2

== 1928 ==
1928 Michigan Tech Huskies football
- Conference: Independent
- Record: 2–2–1
- Head coach: Leon Harvey (6th season)
- Home stadium: Hubbell Field

The 1928 Michigan Tech Huskies football team represented Michigan Technological University as an independent during the 1928 college football season. The Huskies compiled a 2–2–1 record. They ended the season with a win over rival Northern Michigan.

=== Schedule ===
Date	Opponent	Site	Result
October 6	Torch Lake Region		W 7–0
October 13	Northern State Normal (MI)	Houghton, MI	L 0–31
October 20			T 0–0
October 27	Duluth	Houghton, MI	L 7–19
November 3	at Northern State Normal	Marquette, MI	W 13–0

== 1929 ==
1929 Michigan Tech Huskies football
- Conference: Independent
- Record: 2–2–1
- Head coach: Bert Noblet (1st season)
- Home stadium: Hubbell Field

The 1929 Michigan Tech Huskies football team were an American college football team. They represented Michigan Technological University as an independent during the 1929 college football season. The Huskies compiled another 2–2–1 record.

=== Schedule ===
Date	Opponent	Site	Result
October 5	Lake Linden Legion		W 6–0
October 12	Northland (WI)		W 39–2
October 19	Northern State Normal (MI)		T 0–0
October 26	at Duluth	Duluth, MN	L 12–37
November 1	Northern State Normal (MI)		L 0–21
