= 1920 University of Akron football team =

American college football season

1920 Akron football
- Conference: Ohio Athletic Conference
- Record: 4–4 (2–4 OAC)
- Head coach: Fred Sefton (6th season)
- Captain: Carl Daum
- Home stadium: Buchtel Field

1920 Ohio Athletic Conference football standings
	Conf.					Overall
Team	W		L		T	W		L		T
Wooster $	7	–	0	–	0	9	–	0	–	0
Wittenberg	5	–	0	–	0	8	–	0	–	0
Ohio State	2	–	0	–	0	7	–	1	–	0
Denison	5	–	1	–	1	6	–	1	–	1
Oberlin	5	–	2	–	0	5	–	2	–	0
Heidelberg	3	–	2	–	0	7	–	2	–	0
Cincinnati	3	–	2	–	0	4	–	5	–	0
Miami (OH)	3	–	2	–	1	5	–	2	–	1
Mount Union	3	–	3	–	0	6	–	3	–	0
Ohio Wesleyan	3	–	3	–	0	4	–	3	–	0
Ohio Northern	2	–	3	–	0	3	–	4	–	0
Akron	2	–	4	–	0	4	–	4	–	0
Case	2	–	5	–	1	2	–	8	–	1
Ohio	1	–	3	–	0	4	–	3	–	0
Kenyon	1	–	6	–	1	2	–	5	–	1
Western Reserve	1	–	6	–	0	2	–	8	–	0
Hiram	0	–	6	–	0	0	–	9	–	0
$ – Conference champion

The 1920 Akron football team represented the University of Akron in the 1920 college football season. The team was led by sixth-year head coach Fred Sefton. Akron outscored their opponents by a total of 99–93.

== Schedule ==
Date	Opponent	Site	Result	Source
September 26	Defiance*	Buchtel Field; Akron, OH	W 51–0	
October 3	at Western Reserve	Cleveland, OH	W 13–0	
October 10	Baldwin–Wallace	Buchtel Field; Akron, OH	W 21–0	
October 23	Case	Buchtel Field; Akron, OH	L 0–7	
October 30	at Mount Union	Mount Union Stadium; Alliance, OH	L 0–26	
November 7	Hiram*	Butchel Field; Akron, OH	W 14–7	
November 14	Wooster	Buchtel Field; Akron, OH	L 0–14	
November 21	at Ohio	Athens, OH	L 0–39	
*Non-conference game
