= 1920 University Farm football team =

American college football season

1920 University Farm football
- Conference: Independent
- Record: 3–4
- Head coach: Eugene Van Gent (1st season)
- Captain: William J. Fox

1920 Western college football independents records
	Conf.			Overall
Team	W	L	T	W		L		T
Nevada		–		7	–	3	–	1
USC		–		6	–	0	–	0
Arizona		–		6	–	1	–	0
Hawaii		–		6	–	2	–	0
New Mexico A&M		–		5	–	1	–	1
Santa Clara		–		5	–	1	–	0
Gonzaga		–		4	–	3	–	0
Chico State		–		3	–	3	–	0
New Mexico		–		3	–	3	–	0
University Farm		–		3	–	4	–	0
Pacific (CA)		–		1	–	2	–	1
Saint Mary's		–		0	–	3	–	0

The 1920 University Farm football team represented the University Farm—now known as the University of California, Davis—as an independent during the 1920 college football season. Although "University Farm" was the formal name for the school and team, in many newspaper articles from the time it was called "Davis Farm". The team had no nickname in 1920, with the "Aggie" term being introduced in 1922. Led by Eugene Van Gent in his first and only season as head coach, the team compiled a record of 3–4 and was outscored its opponents 67 to 61 for the season. The University Farm played home games in Davis, California.

== Schedule ==
Date	Opponent	Site	Result	Source
September 18	USS Boston (Note: The USS Boston was a cruiser that was launched in 1883. It was decommissioned in 1907, but recommissioned as a Receiving ship in 1918 and towed to Yerba Buena Island in San Francisco Bay)	Davis, CA	W 27–0	
September 25	at Nevada	Mackay Stadium (Note: This stadium is the predecessor to the current Mackay Stadium, which was opened for the 1966 season.); Reno, NV	L 3–7	
October 2	at California third varsity	Berkeley, CA	W 18–0	
October 9	at Santa Clara	Mission Field; Santa Clara, CA	L 0–19	
October 16	vs. Stanford freshmen	Palo Alto, CA	W 13–7	
October 30	at California freshmen	California Field; Berkeley, CA	L 0–13	
November 12	vs. Olympic Club	Sacramento, CA	L 0–21	
