= New Mexico Lobos =

Collegiate athletic program based in Albuquerque, New Mexico

- University: University of New Mexico
- Nickname: Lobo
- NCAA: Division I (FBS)
- Conference: Mountain West
- Athletic director: Ryan Berryman
- Location: Albuquerque, New Mexico
- Varsity teams: 18 (8 men's and 10 women's)
- Football stadium: University Stadium
- Basketball arena: The Pit
- Baseball stadium: Santa Ana Star Field
- Softball stadium: Lobo Softball Field
- Soccer stadium: Great Friends of UNM Track Stadium/UNM Soccer Complex
- Other venues: Albuquerque Convention Center; Johnson Gymnasium
- Colors: Cherry and silver
- Mascot: Lobo Louie and Lobo Lucy
- Fight song: Hail, New Mexico
- Website: www.golobos.com

Team NCAA championships
- 3

Individual and relay NCAA champions
- 78

New Mexico is a member of the Mountain West Conference

The New Mexico Lobos are the athletic teams that represent the University of New Mexico, located in Albuquerque. The university participates in the NCAA Division I in the Mountain West Conference (MW) since 1999, after leaving the Western Athletic Conference. The university's athletic program fields teams in 18 varsity sports.

UNM teams have won 3 national championships. The women's cross-country won the NCAA championship in 2015 and 2017 and the Division I Skiing championship in 2004.

== History ==
The Lobos name began in 1920. A UNM Weekly student newspaper editor, George S. Bryan, came up with the teams' name, the "Lobos", which is the Spanish word for wolf. Previously the University's teams were referred to as the "University Boys" or "Varsities".

== School spirit ==
School spirit

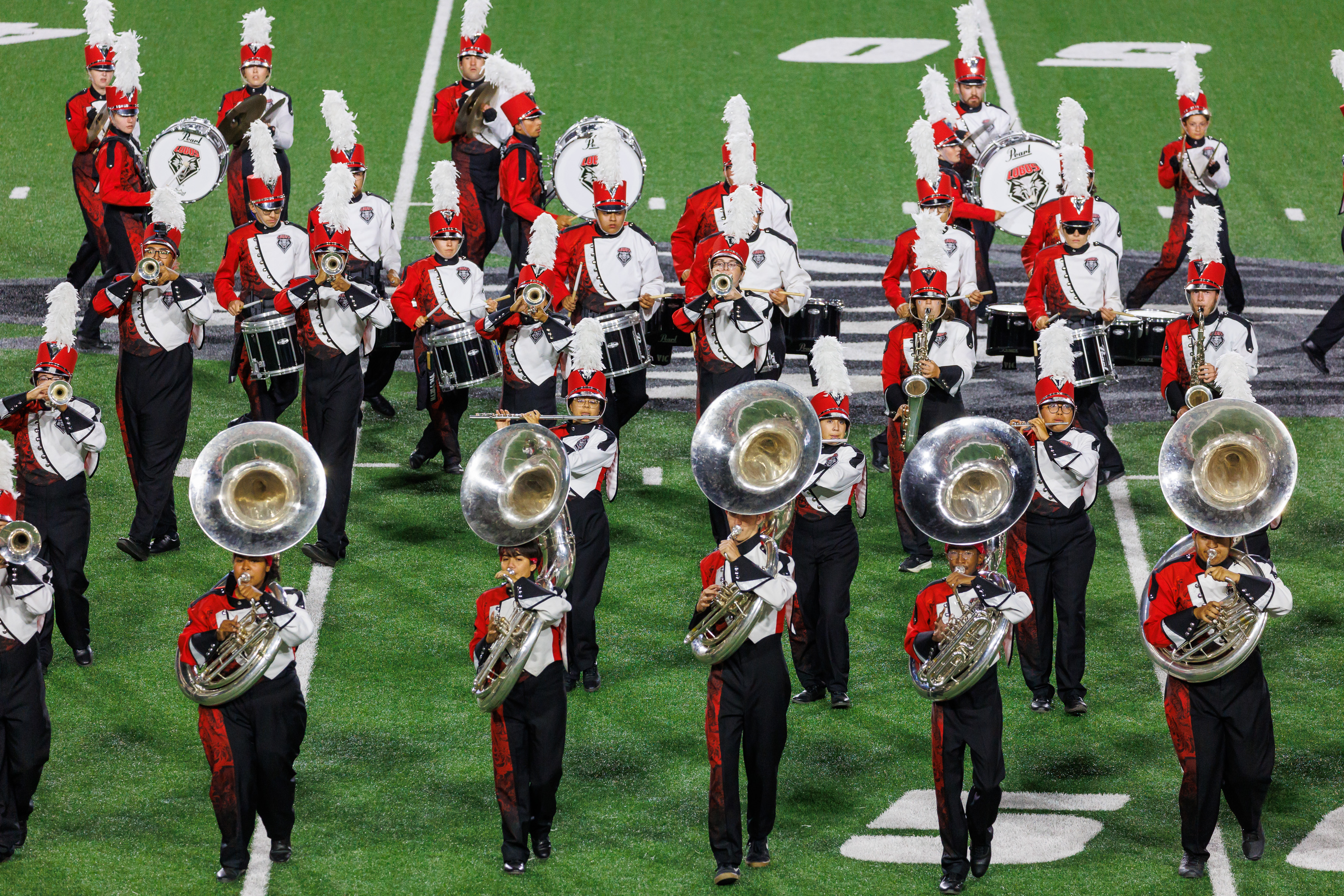
Spirit Marching Band

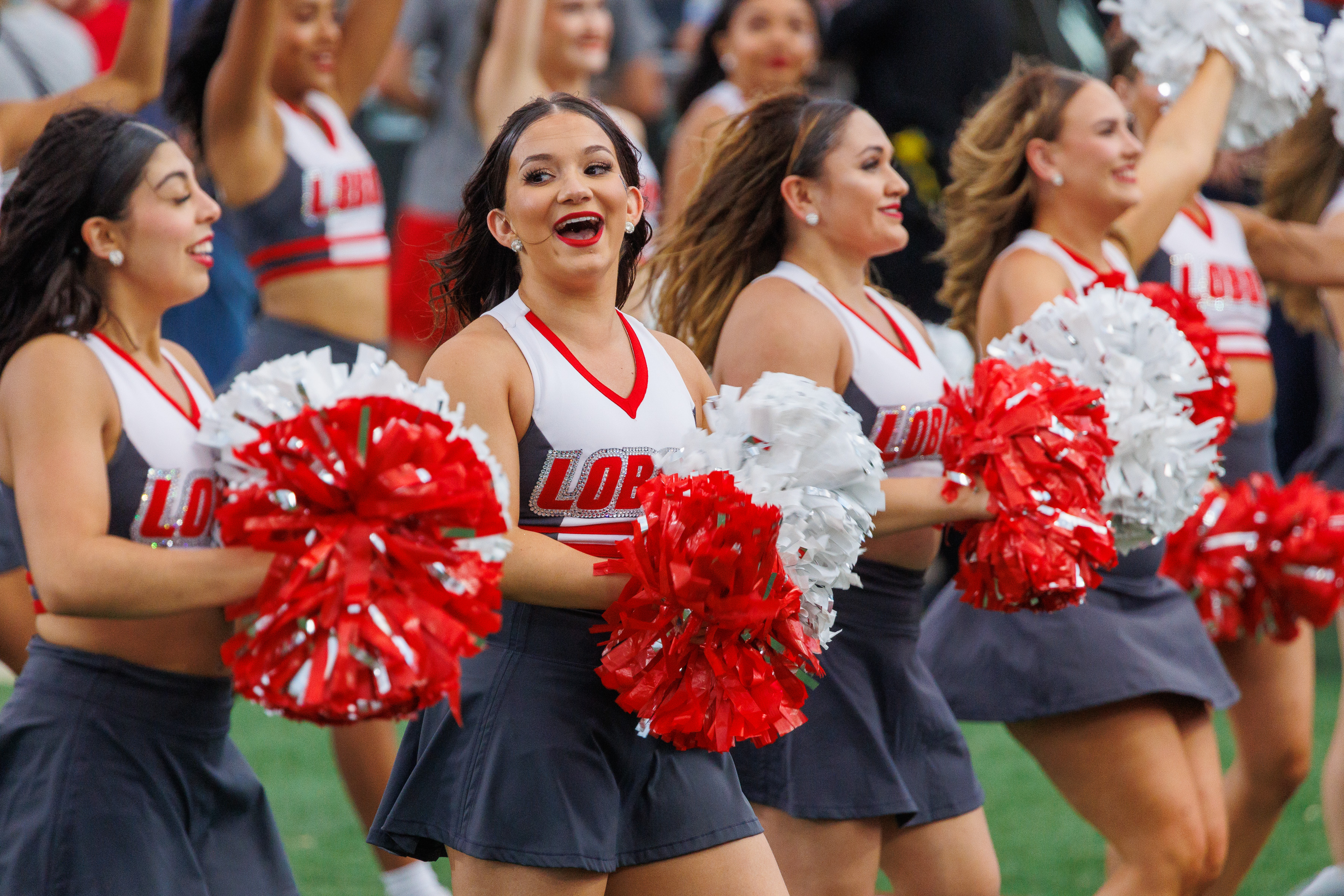
Spirit Squad

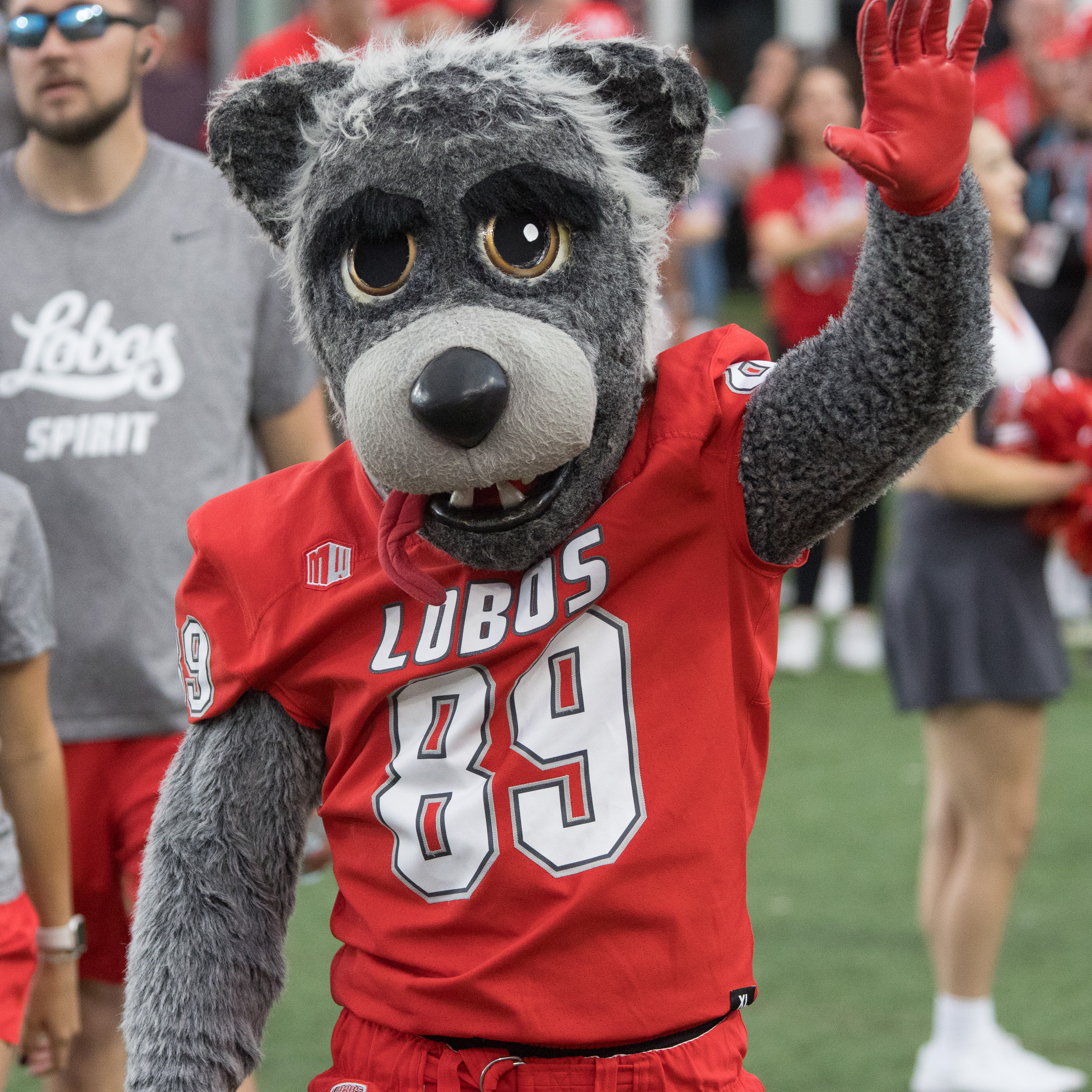
Lobo Louie

=== School colors ===
In the early years of the university, the school colors were black and gold. Tradition holds that in the 1890s, a faculty member suggested the school adopt colors more representative of New Mexico. Crimson and silver were initially suggested based on, respectively, the crimson evening glow of the Sandia Mountains and the description of the Rio Grande as a "silver ribbon winding through the valley" as seen by students and professors taking picnics in the Sandias. Crimson was later changed to the cherry color which is the color of the Sandia sunset. Cherry and Silver became the official colors in 1897. The school also uses turquoise as an official color.

=== Spirit Marching Band ===
Formed in 1917, the Spirit Marching Band performs at football games during pre-game and at halftime, and accompanies the football team to all bowl games. The band hosts the Zia Marching Band Fiesta, a regional marching band competition.

=== Spirit Program and mascot ===
The University of New Mexico Spirit Program consists of two co-ed cheerleading teams (one large and one small), a dance team and the Lobo Louie and Lobo Lucy mascots. The Spirit Program supports both men’s and women’s NCAA sports. The small co-ed team ranked 7th in the nation at the UCA College Nationals in 2010.

The University mascots are anthropomorphized wolves or "Lobos" named Louie and Lucy, they appear at sporting and social events. Lobo Louie was created in the early 1960s and Lobo Lucy was created in the early 1980s.

For a brief period in the 1920s, a live wolf pup appeared at every football game. Jim Young, a government trapper, caught a wolf in the western part of the state. A child teased the wolf at a game and was bitten, which forced officials of the school to get rid of the wolf.

=== Fight song ===
In 1930, the UNM fight song was created. Dean Lena Clauve, a music education professor, wrote the music. Dr. George St. Clair, an English professor, wrote the lyrics.

== Sports sponsored ==
Men's sports	Women's sports
Baseball	Basketball
Basketball	Cross country
Cross country	Golf
Football	Soccer
Golf	Softball
Tennis	Swimming and diving
Track and field^{†}	Tennis
	Track and field^{†}
	Volleyball
† – Track and field includes both indoor and outdoor

The University of New Mexico sponsors teams in 8 men's and 10 women's NCAA sanctioned sports, competing in the Mountain West Conference.

=== Baseball ===
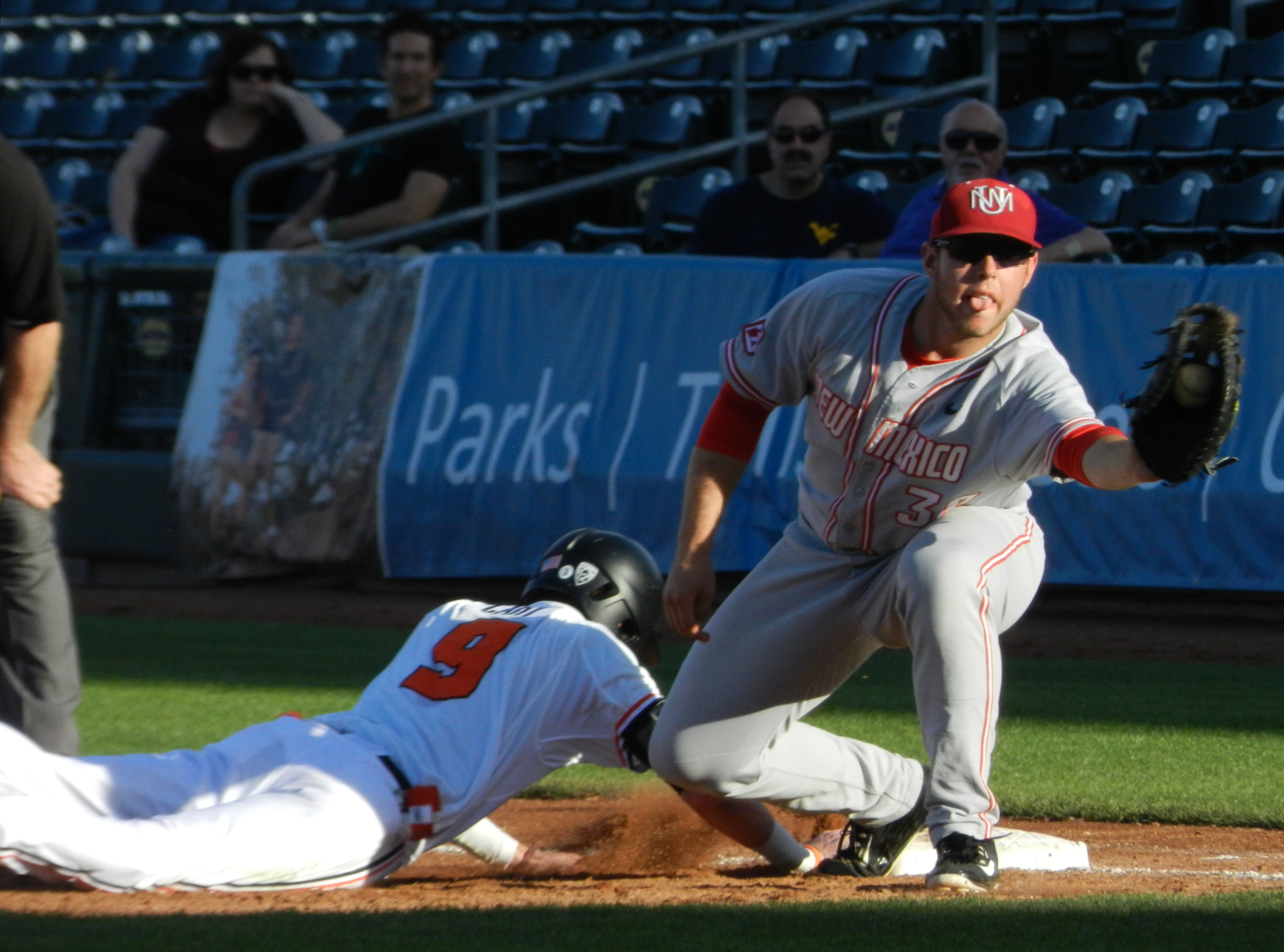
A 2015 baseball game between New Mexico and Oregon State

The baseball team's head coach is Tod Brown, the pitching coach is Michael Lopez and the assistant coach/recruiting coach is Nate Causey.

The Lobo baseball program began in 1899.

In recent years the Lobo baseball program has seen much success; the team competed in the 2010, 2011, 2012, and 2013 NCAA Division I Baseball Championship tournament. Prior to 2010, the Lobos had not made an appearance in the tournament since 1962. In 2012 the Lobos captured both the Mountain West Regular Season and Conference Tournament titles. The Lobos have not made a College World Series appearance in its program's history.

UNM's baseball team plays at Santa Ana Star Field on the university's campus. They averaged 1,294 fans for the 2011 season and ranked 43rd in the NCAA per game.

=== Men's basketball ===
Current Head Coach: Eric Olen

Assistant Coach: Mikey Howell

Assistant Coach: Mike Roberts

Assistant Coach: Sam Stapleton

Assistant Coach: Tom Tankelewicz

Assistant Coach: Michael Wilder

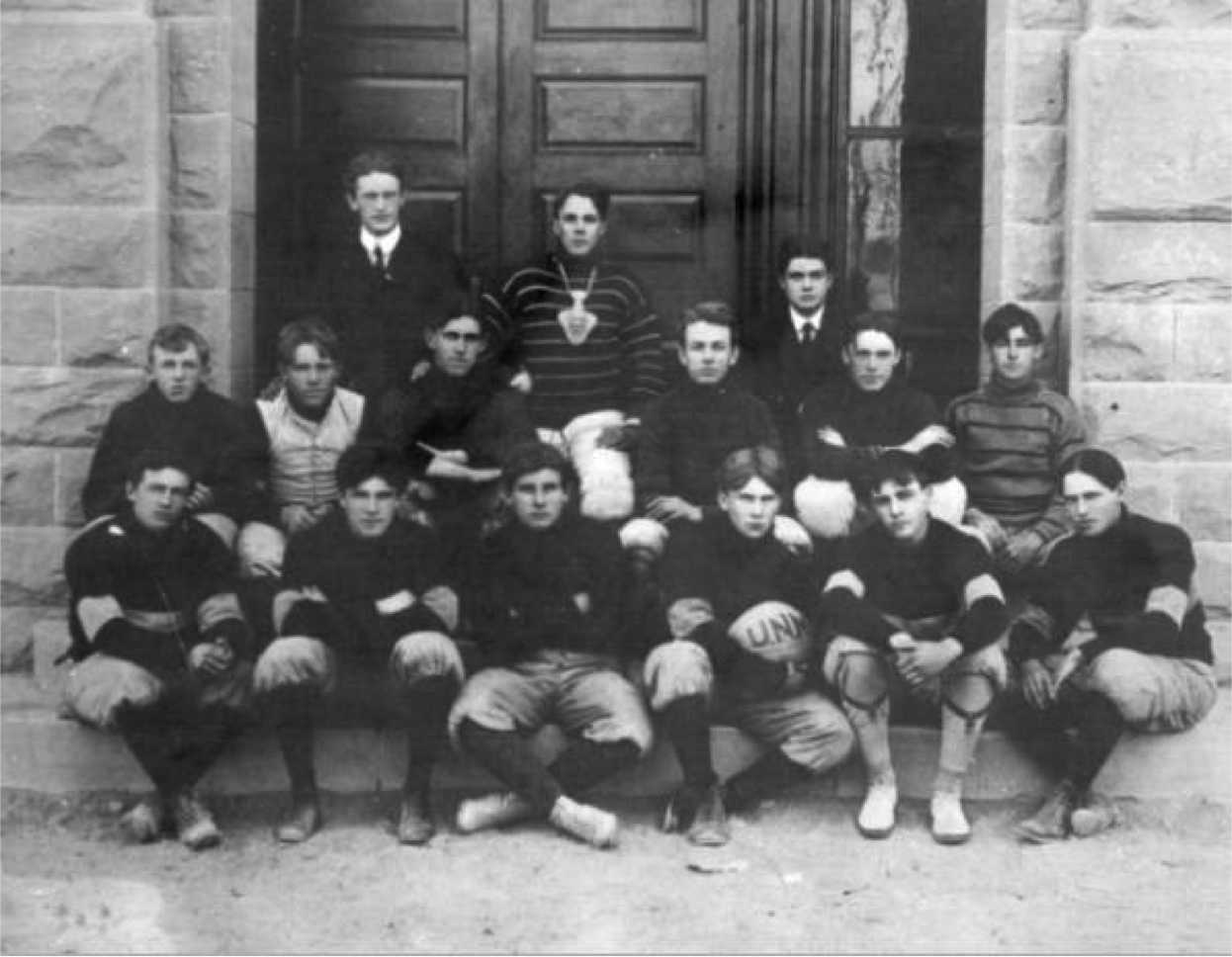
The first men's basketball team (1903)

The Lobo basketball programs were established in 1899, but began its first competitive teams in 1903 and 1906, respectively. In 1920 a head coach would be hired, Roy W. Johnson. The current head coach is Eric Olen

Both men's and women's teams play in The Pit, formally known as Dreamstyle Arena, built in 1966. The Pit seats 15,411 spectators and ranks nationally in attendance for both men's and women's programs. Previously the Lobos played in Johnson Gymnasium and Carlisle Gymnasium, which both still exist on the main campus.

The Lobo men's basketball team has appeared in the NCAA tournament 14 times and have reached the second round seven times. UNM's most successful coaches in terms of wins are Dave Bliss, Bob King, Roy Johnson, and Steve Alford.

=== Women's basketball ===
Current Head Coach: Amy Eagan

Assistant Coach: Jordan Mellott

Assistant Coach: Lindsay Ward

Director of Operations: Makayla Wallace

The Lobo women's basketball team has appeared in the NCAA tournament 8 times. Former head coach Don Flanagan (1999–2011) is the most successful coach in terms of wins.

=== Men's and women's cross country ===
Current Head Coach: Joe Franklin

Assistant Coach: James Butler

Assistant Coach: Dr. Richard Ceronie

Assistant Coach: Laura Bowerman

The women's cross-country team at the University of New Mexico, known as the New Mexico Lobos, won the NCAA championship in 2015. In 2015, head coach Joe Franklin was named NCAA women's coach of the year for the NCAA Mountain Region and the NCAA nationally.

In 2017, UNM won the women's national team title, and Lobo Ednah Kurgat won the individual title. The Lobo women were second place nationally in 2018.

New Mexico women's XC
National; Champions 2017	National; Champions 2015

=== Football ===
Current Head Coach: Jason Eck

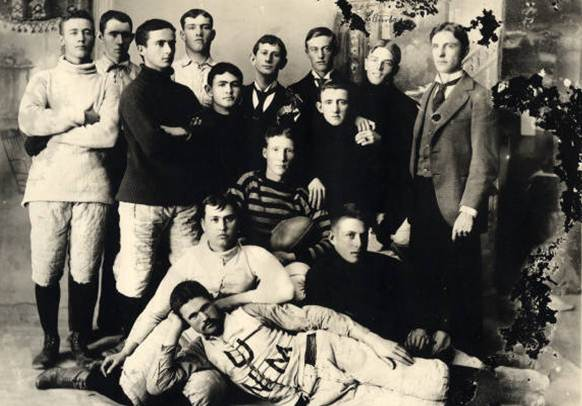
The first football team (1894)

The Lobo football program began in 1892, but compiled its first competitive team in 1894.

The Lobos were previously coached by Mike Locksley from 2009-2011. He was fired in late 2011 after a dismal 2–26 coaching record in 2 1/2 years at New Mexico. Locksley took the place of Rocky Long (1998–2008), who was the winningest coach in the school's history.

The Lobo football program has appeared in 12 bowl games since 1939. The Lobos have captured four wins in bowl games, including the 1946 Sun Bowl, the 1961 Aviation Bowl, and the 2007 and 2016 New Mexico Bowl.

UNM usually plays two large rivalry games each year with non-conference opponents, the Arizona Wildcats and the New Mexico State Aggies. The Rivalry with the Aggies is referred to as the "Rio Grande Rivalry", the rivalry first began in 1894. The Lobos have led the series since the 1940s; it stands at 66–31–5 in favor of the Lobos. The Rivalry with the Wildcats is referred to as the "Kit Carson Rifle"; the rivalry began in the early 1920s. The Wildcats of Arizona have led the series. The last meeting with the teams was in 2008. The Lobos defeated the Wildcats 36–28.

=== Men's golf ===
Current Head Coach: Jake Harrington

Assistant Coach: Sam Saunders

The men's golf team has won 25 conference championships:

- Border Conference (3): 1948, 1949, 1950 (co-champion in 1948)
- Mountain States Conference (6): 1957, 1958, 1959, 1960, 1962, 1991
- Western Athletic Conference (8): 1963, 1964, 1965, 1967, 1979, 1989, 1993, 1996
- Mountain West Conference (8): 2003, 2004, 2005, 2006, 2013, 2014, 2019, 2021

Many Lobo golfers have gone on to play and win on the PGA Tour including: Tommy Armour III (four wins), Charlie Beljan (one), Brad Bryant (one), Curt Byrum (one), Tom Byrum (one), and Tim Herron (four).

=== Women's golf ===
Current Head Coach: Jill Trujillo

Associate Head Coach: Britney Choy

=== Women's soccer ===
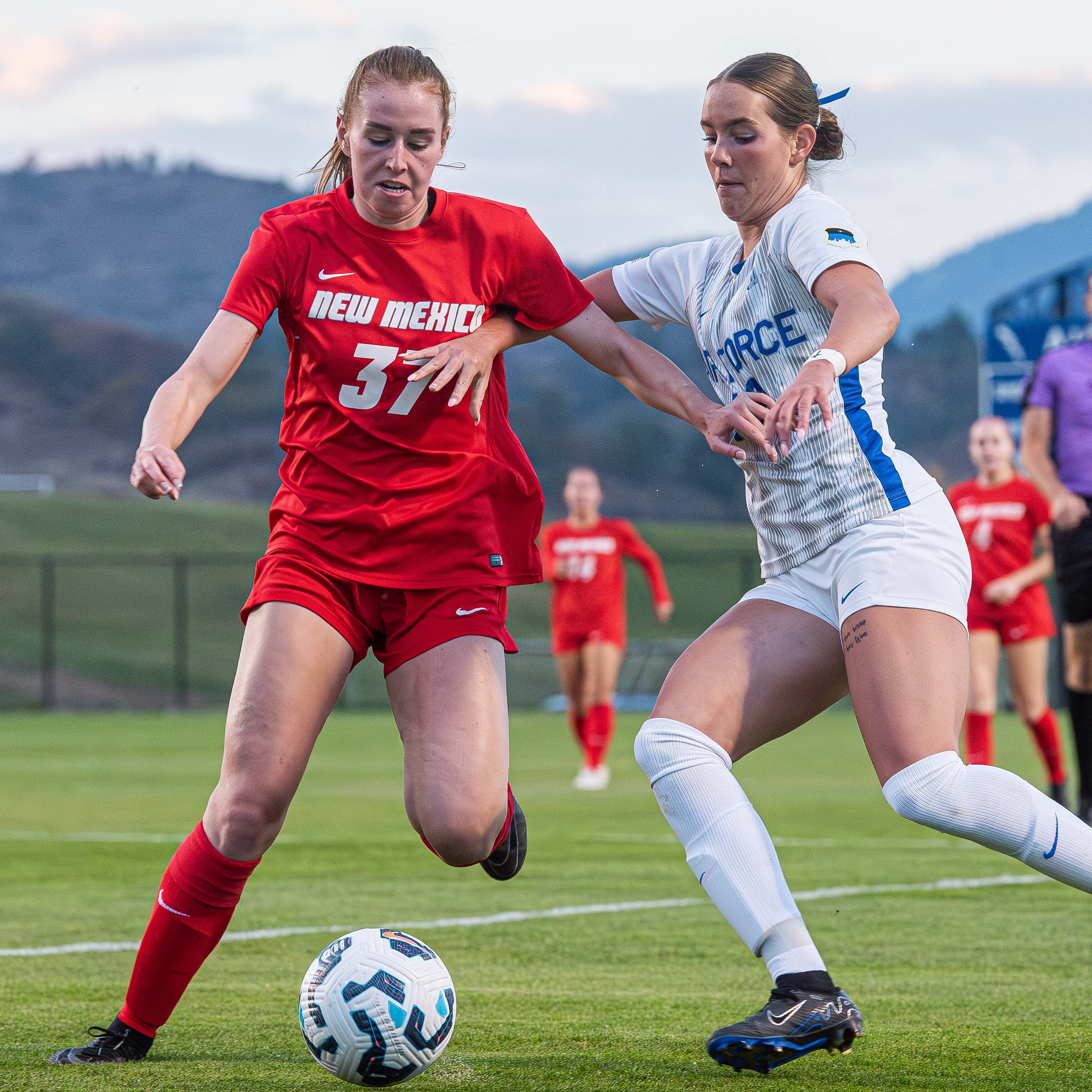
A women's soccer game against Air Force in 2024

Current Head Coach: Karley Nelson
Assistant Coach/Recruiting Coordinator: Tom Hurdle
Assistant Coach: Paul Maestas

=== Softball ===
Head Softball Coach: Nicole Orgeron

Associate Head Coach: Morgan Spearman

Assistant Coaches: Rachael Hathoot and Ariel Fifita

The Lobos softball team has appeared in two Women's College World Series in 1980 and 1981.

=== Men's and Women's Track and Field ===
Current Head Coach: Joe Franklin

Joe Franklin is quoted as saying "We have to keep it fun" Coach Franklin was at Purdue from 1986-1991. This upcoming year will be coach Franklin's fourteenth year as the Track and Field's head coach.

Franklin has led his team to 12 straight women's Mountain West titles.

== Former varsity sports ==
- Skiing - UNM skiing officially became an NCAA-sanctioned program in 1982. They won a national championship in 2004. Citing financial issues, skiing was permanently eliminated in 2019.
- Women's beach volleyball - Beach volleyball was permanently eliminated in 2019 due to financial issues.
- Men's soccer - in 2018, UNM men's soccer was permanently eliminated due to financial issues. They reached the College Cup twice, finishing as national runners-up in 2005.
- Men's wrestling - in 1999, men's wrestling was permanently eliminated due to Title IX considerations and financial issues.
- Men's gymnastics - Men's gymnastics had 16 individual NCAA champions. In 1999, men's gymnastics was permanently eliminated due to Title IX considerations and financial issues.
- Men's swimming - in 1999, men's swimming was permanently eliminated due to Title IX considerations and financial issues.

== Rivalries ==
- Kit Carson Rifle (Arizona Wildcats)
- Rio Grande Rivalry (New Mexico State Aggies)

== Championships ==
=== NCAA team championships ===
New Mexico has won 4 NCAA team national championships.

- Men's (1)
  - Cross Country (1): 2026
- Women's (2)
  - Cross Country (2): 2015, 2017
- Co-ed (1)
  - Skiing (1): 2004
- see also:
  - Mountain West Conference NCAA team championships
  - List of NCAA schools with the most NCAA Division I championships

=== Other national championship appearances ===
- Men's (1)
  - Soccer (1): 2005
- Women's (2)
  - Cross Country (1): 2002, 2022
- Co-ed (1)
  - Skiing (1): 1992, 2006

== Notable former Lobo athletes and coaches ==
=== Basketball ===
- Steve Alford, NBA player and college basketball coach
- Cameron Bairstow, NBA player
- Dave Bliss, winningest head coach at UNM
- Michael Cooper, NBA player and 5-time NBA champion
- Ira Harge, NBA and ABA player
- Darington Hobson, NBA player
- Bob King, head coach and "architect of Lobo basketball."
- Mel Daniels, NBA and ABA player
- Danny Granger, NBA player
- Luc Longley, NBA player and 3-time NBA champion
- Tony Snell, NBA player
- Kenny Thomas, NBA player

=== Football ===
- Stoney Case, NFL player
- Preston Dennard, NFL player
- Roy Johnson, UNM athletic director and football/basketball coach
- Terance Mathis, NFL player
- Winslow Oliver, NFL player
- Don Perkins, NFL player
- Brian Urlacher, NFL player

=== Baseball ===
- Mitch Garver, MLB player
- Jordan Pacheco, MLB player and minor league coach

=== Track and field ===
- Josh Kerr, 2020 Olympic Bronze 1500m medalist

=== Golf ===
- Tommy Armour III, PGA tour golfer
- Charlie Belijan, PGA tour golfer
- Tim Herron, PGA tour golfer

== See also ==
- List of college athletic programs in New Mexico
