= Denny Field =

Denny Field may refer to:

- Denny Field (Alabama), a football playing field at the University of Alabama used from 1915 to 1929
- Denny Field (Washington), an athletic field at the University of Washington, used for football from 1895 to 1920
