= 1920 Pacific Tigers football team =

American college football season

1920 Pacific Tigers football
- Conference: Independent
- Record: 1–2–1
- Head coach: Paul McCoy (1st season)

1920 Western college football independents records
	Conf.			Overall
Team	W	L	T	W		L		T
Nevada		–		7	–	3	–	1
USC		–		6	–	0	–	0
Arizona		–		6	–	1	–	0
Hawaii		–		6	–	2	–	0
New Mexico A&M		–		5	–	1	–	1
Santa Clara		–		5	–	1	–	0
Gonzaga		–		4	–	3	–	0
Chico State		–		3	–	3	–	0
New Mexico		–		3	–	3	–	0
University Farm		–		3	–	4	–	0
Pacific (CA)		–		1	–	2	–	1
Saint Mary's		–		0	–	3	–	0

The 1920 Pacific Tigers football team represented the College of the Pacific—now known as the University of the Pacific—in Stockton, California as an independent during the 1920 college football season. Led by Paul McCoy in his first and only season as head coach, Pacific compiled a record of 1–2–1.

== Schedule ==
Date	Opponent	Site	Result
October 16	UC Davis	College Park, San Jose, CA	T 0–0
October 23	at Stanford freshmen	Berkeley, CA	L 7–42
November 6	San Francisco Veteran Post	College Park, San Jose, CA	L 7–13
November 10	"Invincibles"	College Park, San Jose, CA	W 14–0
