= 1920 Oregon Agricultural Aggies football team =

American college football season

1920 Oregon Agricultural Aggies football
- Head coach Dick Rutherford
- Conference: Northwest Conference, Pacific Coast Conference
- Record: 2–2–2 (0–1–1 Northwest, 1–2–1 PCC)
- Head coach: Dick Rutherford (1st season)
- Captain: Chuck Rose
- Home stadium: Bell Field

1920 Northwest Conference football standings
	Conf.					Overall
Team	W		L		T	W		L		T
Washington State $	3	–	0	–	0	5	–	1	–	0
Oregon	1	–	0	–	1	3	–	2	–	1
Whitman	2	–	1	–	0	3	–	2	–	0
Idaho	2	–	2	–	0	4	–	2	–	0
Oregon Agricultural	0	–	1	–	1	2	–	2	–	2
Willamette	0	–	1	–	0	3	–	1	–	1
Montana	0	–	3	–	0	4	–	3	–	0
$ – Conference champion

1920 Pacific Coast Conference football standings
	Conf.					Overall
Team	W		L		T	W		L		T
California $	3	–	0	–	0	9	–	0	–	0
Stanford	2	–	1	–	0	4	–	3	–	0
Washington State	1	–	1	–	0	5	–	1	–	0
Oregon	1	–	1	–	1	3	–	2	–	1
Oregon Agricultural	1	–	2	–	1	2	–	2	–	2
Washington	0	–	3	–	0	1	–	5	–	0
$ – Conference champion

The 1920 Oregon Agricultural Aggies football team represented Oregon Agricultural College (OAC)—now known as Oregon State University—as a member of the Northwest Conference and the Pacific Coast Conference (PCC) during the 1920 college football season. Led by first-year head coach Dick Rutherford, the Aggies compiled an overall record of 2–2–2 and were outscored by their opponents, 52 to 20. Oregon Agricultural had a record of 0–1–1 in Northwest Conference play and 1–1–2 against PCC opponents, placing fifth in both conferences. The team played home games at Bell Field in Corvallis, Oregon. Henry Rearden was the team captain. Gap Powell played at the fullback and was the offensive star for the Aggies.

In April 1920, Rutherford was hired as the team's head coach. He had played football at Nebraska and had been the head football coach at Washington University in St. Louis from 1917 to 1919.

On October 23, the Aggies defeated Washington, 3–0, for the Aggies' first victory over Washington since 1905. The annual rivalry game with Oregon, played at Corvallis on November 20, 1920, resulted in a scoreless tie. The Aggies also played two games with the Multnomah Athletic Club of Portland, resulting in a win and a tie, and lost games against national champion California (17–7) and Washington State (28–0).

In January 1921, Rutherford was signed to a three-year contract as the school's coach and director of athletics.

== Schedule ==
Date	Opponent	Site	Result	Attendance	Source
October 16	Multnomah Athletic Club*	Bell Field; Corvallis, OR	T 0–0		
October 23	Washington	Denny Field; Seattle, WA	W 3–0	7,000	
October 30	California	Bell Field; Corvallis, OR	L 7–17	12,000	
November 13	at Washington State	Rogers Field; Pullman, WA	L 0–28	3,000	
November 20	Oregon	Bell Field; Corvallis, OR (rivalry)	T 0–0		
November 25	at Multnomah Athletic Club*	Multnomah Field; Portland, OR	W 10–7		
*Non-conference game

== Roster ==
The following players received letters for their participation on the Aggies' 1920 football team.

- Emil Christensen
- Edward Clark
- Andrew Crowell
- Charles Daigh
- Ted Heyden
- Gap Powell
- Albert "Duke" Hodler
- Clarence Johnston
- Dough Johnston
- Joe Kasberger
- Marlon McCart
- Harold McKenna
- Hugh McKenna
- Henry Rearden
- Millard Scott
- Claire R. Seely
- Robert Stewart
- Stanley Summers
- Harry Swan
- Herman Wood
