= 1920 Montana Grizzlies football team =

American college football season

1920 Montana Grizzlies football
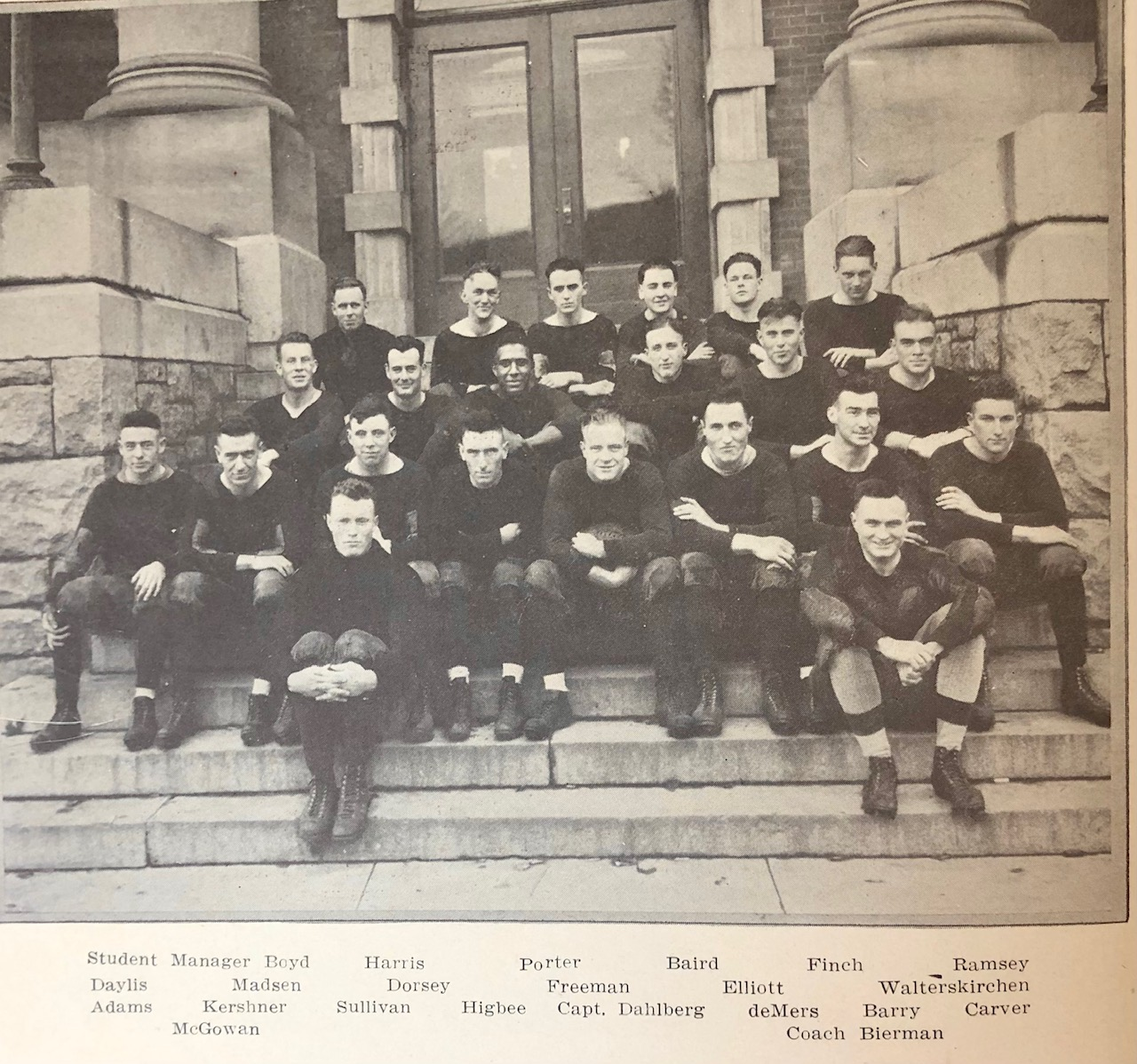
- Conference: Northwest Conference
- Record: 4–3 (0–3 Northwest)
- Head coach: Bernie Bierman (2nd season)
- Captain: Swede Dalberg
- Home stadium: Dornblaser Field

1920 Northwest Conference football standings
	Conf.					Overall
Team	W		L		T	W		L		T
Washington State $	3	–	0	–	0	5	–	1	–	0
Oregon	1	–	0	–	1	3	–	2	–	1
Whitman	2	–	1	–	0	3	–	2	–	0
Idaho	2	–	2	–	0	4	–	2	–	0
Oregon Agricultural	0	–	1	–	1	2	–	2	–	2
Willamette	0	–	1	–	0	3	–	1	–	1
Montana	0	–	3	–	0	4	–	3	–	0
$ – Conference champion

The 1920 Montana Grizzlies football teamrepresented the University of Montana as a member of the Northwest Conference during the 1920 college football season. In their second of three seasons under head coach Bernie Bierman, the Grizzlies compiled an overall record of 4–3 with a mark of 0–3 in conference play, and outscored opponents by a total of 227 to 92. The highlights of the season were a 133–0 victory over Mount St. Charles in the first game of the season (the largest margin of victory by any team during the 1920 college football season); an 18–14 victory over Washington at Seattle on October 16; and a victory over rival Montana State on November 13. Tackle Swede Dalberg was the team captain. The team played home games at Dornblaser Field in Missoula, Montana.

Bierman was 26 years old during the 1920 season. He went on to coach the Minnesota Golden Gophers football team from 1932 to 1950 and was inducted into the College Football Hall of Fame in 1955.

== Schedule ==
Date	Opponent	Site	Result	Attendance	Source
October 9	Mount St. Charles*	Dornblaser Field; Missoula, MT	W 133–0		
October 16	at Washington*	Denny Field; Seattle, WA	W 18–14	2,400	
October 23	Montana Wesleyan*	Dornblaser Field; Missoula, MT	W 34–14		
October 30	at Washington State	Rogers Field; Pullman, WA	L 0–31	5,000	
November 6	at Whitman	Ankeny Field; Walla Walla, WA	L 7–13		
November 13	Montana State*	Dornblaser Field; Missoula, MT (rivalry)	W 28–0		
November 20	Idaho	Dornblaser Field; Missoula, MT (rivalry)	L 7–20		
*Non-conference game

== Players ==
The following players participated on the 1920 Montana football team: Asterisks identify the 18 players who received varsity letters.

- Harry Adams (*) - halfback and quarterback
- Tick Baird (*) - halfback
- Barry (*)
- Dwight Carver (*) - end
- Swede DaHlberg (*) - tackle and captain
- Cubs Daylis (*) - end
- Frog de Mers (*) - guard
- Jim Dorsey (*) - end
- Jelly Elliott (*) - guard
- Eugene Finch
- Paul Freeman (*) - center
- Jimmy Harris (*) - guard and halfback
- Larry Higbee (*) - halfback
- Bullet Joe Kershner (*) - fullback
- Lloyd Madsen (*) - end
- McGowan (*)
- Jimmy Morris
- Gil Porter - quarterback
- Ramsey (*)
- Steve Sullivan (*) - back
- Bill Walterskirchen (*) - center
