= 1920 Whitman Fighting Missionaries football team =

American college football season

1920 Whitman Fighting Missionaries football
- Conference: Northwest Conference
- Record: 3–2 (2–1 Northwest)
- Head coach: Vincent Borleske (5th season)
- Home stadium: Ankeny Field

1920 Northwest Conference football standings
	Conf.					Overall
Team	W		L		T	W		L		T
Washington State $	3	–	0	–	0	5	–	1	–	0
Oregon	1	–	0	–	1	3	–	2	–	1
Whitman	2	–	1	–	0	3	–	2	–	0
Idaho	2	–	2	–	0	4	–	2	–	0
Oregon Agricultural	0	–	1	–	1	2	–	2	–	2
Willamette	0	–	1	–	0	3	–	1	–	1
Montana	0	–	3	–	0	4	–	3	–	0
$ – Conference champion

The 1920 Whitman Fighting Missionaries football team represented Whitman College as a member of the Northwest Conference during the 1920 college football season. Under fifth-year head coach Vincent Borleske, the Fighting Missionaries compiled an overall record of 3–2 with a mark of 2–1 in conference play, placing third in the Northwest Conference. Whitman played home games at Ankeny Field in Walla Walla, Washington.

== Schedule ==
Date	Opponent	Site	Result	Attendance	Source
October 9	at Washington*	Denny Field; Seattle, WA	L 14–33	4,916	
October 23	at College of Idaho*	Caldwell, ID	W 21–14		
October 30	Idaho	Ankeny Field; Walla Walla, WA	L 7–21		
November 6	Montana	Ankeny Field; Walla Walla, WA	W 13–7		
November 24	at Willamette	Sweetland Field; Salem, OR	W 7–0	1,800	
*Non-conference game
