= Helen Johnston =

American physician

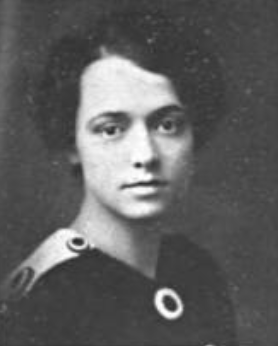
- Helen Johnston, from the 1913 yearbook of Drake University
- Born: February 5, 1891; Columbus City, Iowa
- Died: 15 June 1969 (aged 78); Sun City, California
- Occupations: Physician, clubwoman
- Known for: President of Altrusa International, president of American Medical Women's Association (1946-1947)

Helen F. Johnston (February 5, 1891 – June 15, 1969) was an American physician and clubwoman, based in Iowa. She was president of the American Medical Women's Association from 1946 to 1947, and president of Altrusa International in 1928 and 1929.

== Early life and education ==
Johnston was born in Columbus City, Iowa, the daughter of Rufus Sherman Johnston and Louise Colton Johnston. Her father was active in local and state government. She earned a bachelor's degree from Drake University in 1913, attended medical school at the University of Iowa. She completed her medical degree in 1919, from Cornell University College of Medicine. She was a member of Delta Zeta sorority.

== Career ==
From 1920 to 1959, Johnston maintained a private internal medicine practice in Des Moines, Iowa, specializing in women's health and pediatrics. During the early 1920s she was involved with baby clinics held at Iowa State University under provisions of the Sheppard–Towner Act. Later in the 1920s she was the national health chair of Delta Zeta. She was president of the American Medical Women's Association from 1946 to 1947. She was a councilor to the Medical Women's International Association, attending the group's international conferences in Sweden (1934), the Netherlands (1947), France (1952), England (1958), Germany (1960), and the Philippines (1962).

Johnston was Iowa state chair of the National Woman's Party in 1924. She was elected the ninth national president of Altrusa International in 1928 and 1929, and stayed involved with the organization for many years after. She served on the Defense Advisory Committee on Women in Services from 1954 to 1957. She was named Iowa's Medical Woman of the Year in 1956, and Delta Zeta's Woman of the Year in 1957.

== Personal life and legacy ==
Helen Johnston had spinal surgery in 1962, and left Des Moines in 1964 to live with her friend, Mrs. Arthur Turner, in Sun City, California. She died there in 1969, from cancer, aged 78 years. Her home in Des Moines, built in 1938, is still a striking example of modern architecture in that city, now known as the Helen Johnston House.
