= Thomas Kelley (coach) =

American football player and sports coach

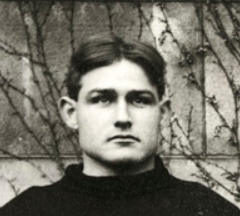
- Kelly, c. 1908

Biographical details
- Born: c. 1888; Du Quoin, Illinois, U.S.

Playing career

Football
- 1906, 1908–1909: Chicago
- Position: Tackle

Coaching career (HC unless noted)

Football
- 1911–1913: Muhlenberg
- 1914: Missouri Mines
- 1915–1917: Alabama
- 1919: Missouri (assistant)
- 1920–1921: Idaho
- 1922: Missouri

Basketball
- 1912–1914: Muhlenberg
- 1916–1917: Alabama

Administrative career (AD unless noted)
- 1915: Alabama
- 1920–1922: Idaho

Head coaching record
- Overall: 56–24–3 (football); 18–23 (basketball)

Accomplishments and honors

Records
- Military career
- Allegiance: United States
- Branch: United States Army
- Service years: 1917–1918
- Conflicts: World War I

Thomas Kelley (born c. 1888) was an American college football player and coach, college basketball coach, and athletics administrator. He served as the head football coach at Muhlenberg College from 1911 to 1913, the Missouri School of Mines and Metallurgy—now known as the Missouri University of Science and Technology—in 1914, the University of Alabama from 1915 to 1917, the University of Idaho from 1920 to 1921, and the University of Missouri in 1922, compiling a career college football head coaching record of 56–24–3 (.693). Kelley was also the head basketball coach at Muhlenberg from 1912 to 1914 and Alabama for the 1916–17 season, tallying a career college basketball record of 18–23 (.439). In addition, he served as the athletic director at Alabama in 1915 and Idaho from 1920 to 1922.

== Playing career ==
Kelley played college football at the University of Chicago as a tackle for the Maroons under head coach Amos Alonzo Stagg.

== Coaching career ==
In 1915 at Alabama, Kelley coached only the first half of season (4–0) before he came down with typhoid fever. Athletic director B. L. Noojin and former Alabama quarterback Farley Moody took over the head coaching duties for the remaining four games of the season. The 2–2 mark achieved in Kelly's absence is still credited to his record at Alabama of 17–7–1 (.700).

Kelley served in the U.S. Army in World War I and returned to coaching as an assistant at Missouri in 1919. He moved west in March 1920 and accepted the dual position of athletic director and head football coach at Idaho; under his leadership the Vandals were admitted to the Pacific Coast Conference in 1922. In addition to his duties at the university, he was also the state's boxing commissioner. After two years in Moscow, Kelley accepted the position of head football coach at Missouri in June 1922 at a salary of $4,500 per year, but resigned prior to the completion of his first season.

Kelley also coached college basketball for three seasons, two at Muhlenberg College (1912–14) and one at Alabama (1916–17), with an overall record of 18–23.

== Head coaching record ==
=== Football ===
Year	Team	Overall	Conference	Standing	Bowl/playoffs
Muhlenberg Cardinal and Grey (Independent) (1911–1913)
1911	Muhlenberg	5–4			
1912	Muhlenberg	6–3			
1913	Muhlenberg	6–2–1			
Muhlenberg:		17–9–1			
Missouri Mines Miners (Independent) (1914)
1914	Missouri Mines	9–0			
Missouri Mines:		9–0			
Alabama Crimson Tide (Southern Intercollegiate Athletic Association) (1915–1917)
1915	Alabama	6–2	5–0		
1916	Alabama	6–3	4–3		
1917	Alabama	5–2–1	3–1–1		
Alabama:		17–7–1	11–4–1		
Idaho Vandals (Northwest Conference) (1920–1921)
1920	Idaho	4–2	2–2	4th	
1921	Idaho	4–3–1	1–2–1	5th	
Idaho:		8–5–1	3–4–1		
Missouri Tigers (Missouri Valley Intercollegiate Athletic Association) (1922)
1922	Missouri	5–3	4–3	4th	
Missouri:		5–3	4–3		
Total:		56–24–3			

== Sources ==
- Groom, Winston. The Crimson Tide – An Illustrated History. Tuscaloosa: The University of Alabama Press, 2000. ISBN 0-8173-1051-7-.
