= 1920 New Mexico Lobos football team =

American college football season

1920 New Mexico Lobos football
- Conference: Independent
- Record: 3–3
- Head coach: Roy W. Johnson (1st season)
- Captain: Grant Mann
- Home stadium: University field

1920 Western college football independents records
	Conf.			Overall
Team	W	L	T	W		L		T
Nevada		–		7	–	3	–	1
USC		–		6	–	0	–	0
Arizona		–		6	–	1	–	0
Hawaii		–		6	–	2	–	0
New Mexico A&M		–		5	–	1	–	1
Santa Clara		–		5	–	1	–	0
Gonzaga		–		4	–	3	–	0
Chico State		–		3	–	3	–	0
New Mexico		–		3	–	3	–	0
University Farm		–		3	–	4	–	0
Pacific (CA)		–		1	–	2	–	1
Saint Mary's		–		0	–	3	–	0

The 1920 New Mexico Lobos football team represented the University of New Mexico as an independent during the 1920 college football season. In their first season under head coach Roy W. Johnson, the Lobos compiled a 3–3 record.

Johnson was hired to take charge of the school's physical education department in August 1920. He received his bachelor's degree from the University of Michigan earlier in the year and had played at the center position on the 1919 Michigan Wolverines football team.

In the fall of 1920, the school adopted the nickname "Lobos" for their athletic teams. The U.N.M. Weekly published an editorial explaining the selection:

Eureka! At last, a real name for the university teams. A name with a wallop in both fists -- a name which will make you sit up and take notice.
In this wild west we must have a name fitting to our surroundings. The terror of the mountains and prairie, the king of all the western lands is that feared and hated animal -- the Lobo. Who has heard his terrible war cry without the cold shivers of fear running down his back?
The lobo is respected for his cunning, feared for his prowess, and is the leader of the pack. It is the ideal name for the varsity boys who go forth for the glory of the school."

Halfback Grant Mann was the team captain. His brother Claude Mann was captain of the 1919 team.

== Schedule ==
Date	Opponent	Site	Result	Source
October 16	at Colorado College	Washburn Field; Colorado Springs, CO	L 3–42	
October 30	Fort Bliss	University field; Albuquerque, NM	W 12–0	
November 6	Texas Mines	University field; Albuquerque, NM	W 69–0	
November 11	New Mexico Military	University field; Albuquerque, NM	W 9–7	
November 20	at Arizona	Tucson, AZ (rivalry)	L 7–28	
November 25	at New Mexico A&M	Las Cruces, NM (rivalry)	L 7–14	
