= 1920 Colorado Silver and Gold football team =

American college football season

1920 Colorado Silver and Gold football
- Conference: Rocky Mountain Conference
- Record: 4–1–2 (3–1–2 RMC)
- Head coach: Myron E. Witham (1st season)
- Captain: Alva Noggle
- Home stadium: Gamble Field

1920 Rocky Mountain Conference football standings
	Conf.					Overall
Team	W		L		T	W		L		T
Colorado Agricultural $	6	–	0	–	1	6	–	1	–	1
Colorado College	4	–	1	–	1	5	–	1	–	1
Colorado	3	–	1	–	2	4	–	1	–	2
Utah Agricultural	2	–	1	–	1	4	–	2	–	1
Denver	2	–	4	–	0	2	–	4	–	0
Utah	1	–	2	–	1	1	–	5	–	1
Wyoming	2	–	5	–	1	4	–	5	–	1
Colorado Mines	0	–	6	–	0	0	–	6	–	0
Montana State	0	–	0	–	1	4	–	1	–	1
$ – Conference champion

The 1920 Colorado Silver and Gold football team was an American football team that represented the University of Colorado as a member of the Rocky Mountain Conference (RMC) during the 1920 college football season. In its first season under head coach Myron E. Witham, the team compiled a 4–1–2 record (3–1–2 against RMC opponents), tied for third place in the conference, and outscored opponents by a total of 99 to 28.

== Schedule ==
Date	Opponent	Site	Result	Source
October 16	at Denver	Denver, CO	W 31–0	
October 23	at Wyoming	Laramie, WY	W 7–0	
October 31	Colorado College^{†}	Gamble Field; Boulder, CO	T 7–7	
November 6	Utah	Gamble Field; Boulder, CO (rivalry)	L 0–7	
November 13	at Colorado Mines	Golden, CO	W 7–0	
November 20	Colorado Agricultural	Gamble Field; Boulder, CO (rivalry)	T 7–7	
November 25	vs. Oklahoma A&M*	Western League Park; Oklahoma City, OK	W 40–7	
*Non-conference game; ^{†}Homecoming
