= 1920 Santa Clara Missionites football team =

American college football season

1920 Santa Clara Missionites football
- Conference: Independent
- Record: 5–1
- Head coach: Robert E. Harmon (2nd season)
- Home stadium: Mission Field

1920 Western college football independents records
	Conf.			Overall
Team	W	L	T	W		L		T
Nevada		–		7	–	3	–	1
USC		–		6	–	0	–	0
Arizona		–		6	–	1	–	0
Hawaii		–		6	–	2	–	0
New Mexico A&M		–		5	–	1	–	1
Santa Clara		–		5	–	1	–	0
Gonzaga		–		4	–	3	–	0
Chico State		–		3	–	3	–	0
New Mexico		–		3	–	3	–	0
University Farm		–		3	–	4	–	0
Pacific (CA)		–		1	–	2	–	1
Saint Mary's		–		0	–	3	–	0

The 1920 Santa Clara Missionites football team was an American football team that represented Santa Clara University as an independent during the 1920 college football season. In their second and final season under head coach Robert E. Harmon, the team compiled a 5–1 record, shut out three of six opponents, and outscored all opponents by a total of 141 to 55.

Harmon also coached other sports at Santa Clara. In June 1920, he left his position at Santa Clara to join a law firm in Illinois.

== Schedule ==
Date	Opponent	Site	Result	Attendance	Source
September 9	vs. Olympic Club	Ewing Field; San Francisco, CA	W 7–0		
October 9	University Farm	Mission Field; Santa Clara, CA	W 19–0		
October 23	Stanford	Santa Clara Stadium; Santa Clara, CA	L 7–21	10,000	
November 13	Mare Island Sailors	Mission Field; Santa Clara, CA	W 48–13		
November 25	Nevada	San Francisco, CA	W 24–21		
	USS Boston		W 46–0		
