= 1920 Washington Sun Dodgers football team =

American college football season

1920 Washington Sun Dodgers football
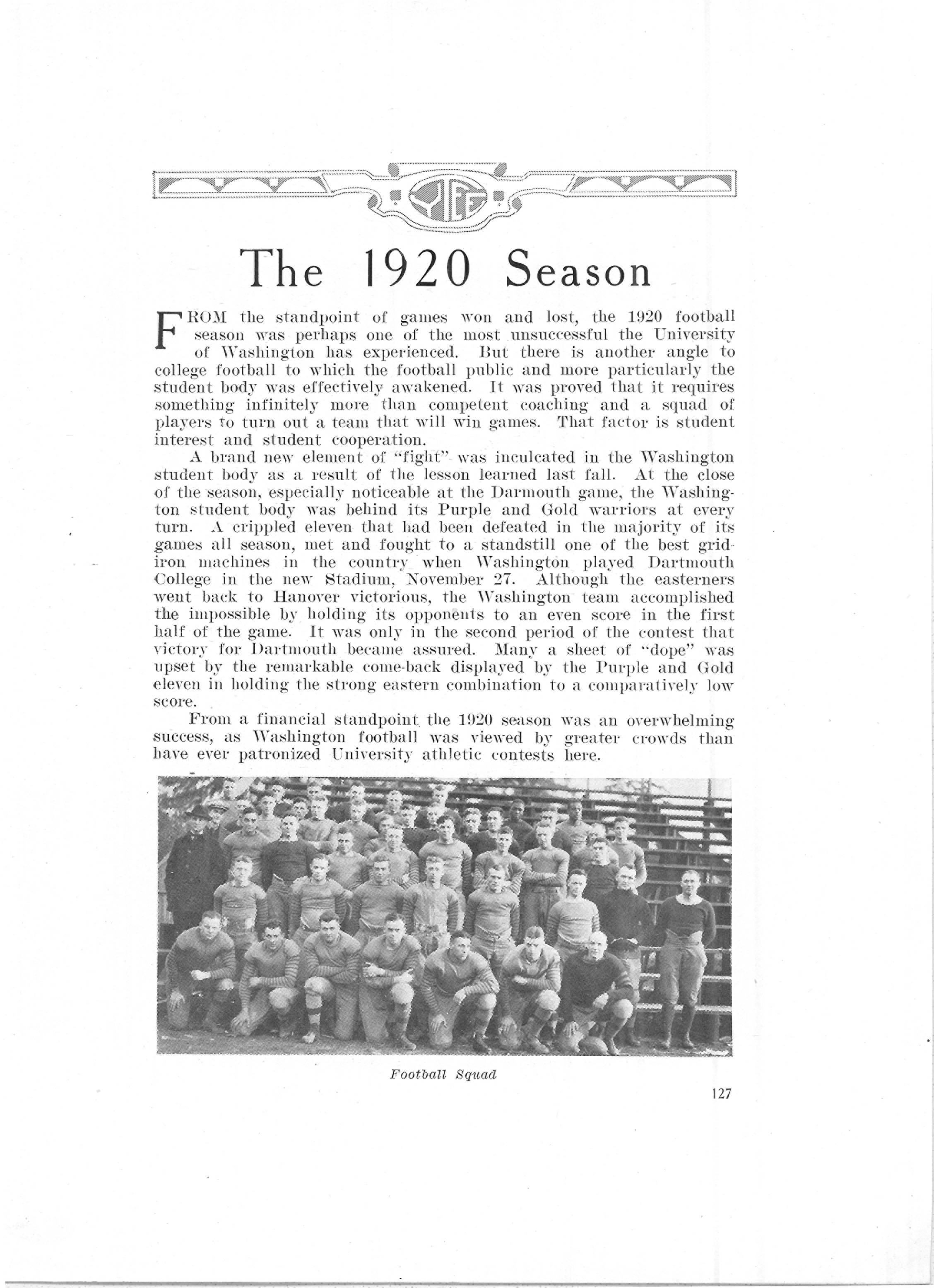
- Conference: Pacific Coast Conference
- Record: 1–5 (0–3 PCC)
- Head coach: Stub Allison (1st season)
- Captain: Ted Faulk
- Home stadium: Denny Field, University of Washington Stadium

1920 Pacific Coast Conference football standings
	Conf.					Overall
Team	W		L		T	W		L		T
California $	3	–	0	–	0	9	–	0	–	0
Stanford	2	–	1	–	0	4	–	3	–	0
Washington State	1	–	1	–	0	5	–	1	–	0
Oregon	1	–	1	–	1	3	–	2	–	1
Oregon Agricultural	1	–	2	–	1	2	–	2	–	2
Washington	0	–	3	–	0	1	–	5	–	0
$ – Conference champion

The 1920 Washington Sun Dodgers football team represented the University of Washington during the 1920 college football season. Home games were played on campus in Seattle at Denny Field, with the final game played at the newly constructed University of Washington Stadium.

In its first season under coach Stub Allison, the team compiled a 1–5 record, finished in last place in the Pacific Coast Conference, and was outscored by its opponents by a combined total of 83 to 54. Ted Faulk was the team captain.

The final game at Denny Field was a 3–0 loss to Stanford on Saturday, November 6. The venue later known as Husky Stadium was opened for the season's concluding game, a 28–7 homecoming loss to Dartmouth on November 27.

== Schedule ==
Date	Time	Opponent	Site	Result	Attendance	Source
October 9		Whitman*	Denny Field; Seattle, WA	W 33–14	4,916	
October 16		Montana*	Denny Field; Seattle, WA	L 14–18	2,400	
October 23		Oregon Agricultural	Denny Field; Seattle, WA	L 0–3	7,000	
November 6		Stanford	Denny Field; Seattle, WA	L 0–3	9,000	
November 13		at Oregon	Hayward Field; Eugene, OR (rivalry)	L 0–17	5,000	
November 27	2:15 p.m.	Dartmouth*^{†}	University of Washington Stadium; Seattle, WA	L 7–28	24,500	
*Non-conference game; ^{†}Homecoming; Source:
