= 1920 Nevada Sagebrushers football team =

American college football season

1920 Nevada Sagebrushers football
- Conference: Independent
- Record: 7–3–1
- Head coach: Ray Courtright (2nd season)
- Home stadium: Mackay Field

1920 Western college football independents records
	Conf.			Overall
Team	W	L	T	W		L		T
Nevada		–		7	–	3	–	1
USC		–		6	–	0	–	0
Arizona		–		6	–	1	–	0
Hawaii		–		6	–	2	–	0
New Mexico A&M		–		5	–	1	–	1
Santa Clara		–		5	–	1	–	0
Gonzaga		–		4	–	3	–	0
Chico State		–		3	–	3	–	0
New Mexico		–		3	–	3	–	0
University Farm		–		3	–	4	–	0
Pacific (CA)		–		1	–	2	–	1
Saint Mary's		–		0	–	3	–	0

The 1920 Nevada Sagebrushers football team was an American football team that represented the University of Nevada as an independent during the 1920 college football season. In their second season under head coach Ray Courtright, the team compiled a 7–3–1 record and outscored opponents by a total of 186 to 167.

== Schedule ==
Date	Opponent	Site	Result	Attendance	Source
September 11	Nevada Alumni	Mackay Field; Reno, NV	W 20–6		
September 25	University Farm	Mackay Field; Reno, NV	W 7–3		
October 2	American Legion (S.F.)	Mackay Field; Reno, NV	W 47–7		
October 9	Mare Island Marines	Mackay Field; Reno, NV	W 28–0		
October 16	at California	California Field; Berkeley, CA	L 7–79		
October 30	at Utah	Cummings Field; Salt Lake City, UT	W 14–7		
November 6	Utah Agricultural	Mackay Field; Reno, NV	W 21–0		
November 13	at USC	Bovard Field; Los Angeles, CA	L 7–38		
November 25	at Santa Clara	San Francisco, CA	L 21–24		
December 25	at Hawaii	Alexander Field; Honolulu, Territory of Hawaii	W 14–0	4,000	
January 1, 1921	at Outrigger AC	Honolulu, Territory of Hawaii	T 0–0		
