= 1920 Oregon Webfoots football team =

American college football season

1920 Oregon Webfoots football
- Oregon team at Hayward Field
- Conference: Northwest Conference, Pacific Coast Conference
- Record: 3–2–1 (1–0–1 Northwest, 1–1–1 PCC)
- Head coach: Charles A. Huntington (3rd season)
- Captain: Williams Steers
- Home stadium: Hayward Field

1920 Northwest Conference football standings
	Conf.					Overall
Team	W		L		T	W		L		T
Washington State $	3	–	0	–	0	5	–	1	–	0
Oregon	1	–	0	–	1	3	–	2	–	1
Whitman	2	–	1	–	0	3	–	2	–	0
Idaho	2	–	2	–	0	4	–	2	–	0
Oregon Agricultural	0	–	1	–	1	2	–	2	–	2
Willamette	0	–	1	–	0	3	–	1	–	1
Montana	0	–	3	–	0	4	–	3	–	0
$ – Conference champion

1920 Pacific Coast Conference football standings
	Conf.					Overall
Team	W		L		T	W		L		T
California $	3	–	0	–	0	9	–	0	–	0
Stanford	2	–	1	–	0	4	–	3	–	0
Washington State	1	–	1	–	0	5	–	1	–	0
Oregon	1	–	1	–	1	3	–	2	–	1
Oregon Agricultural	1	–	2	–	1	2	–	2	–	2
Washington	0	–	3	–	0	1	–	5	–	0
$ – Conference champion

The 1920 Oregon Webfoots football team represented the University of Oregon as a member of the Northwest Conference and the Pacific Coast Conference (PCC) during the 1920 college football season. In their third season under head coach Charles A. Huntington, the Webfoots compiled an overall record of 3–2–1, shut out three of six opponents, and were outscored by their opponents 38 to 37. Oregon had a record of 1–1 in Northwest Conference play, placing second, and 1–1–1 against PCC opponents, tying for third place. The team played its home games on campus at Hayward Field in Eugene, Oregon.

== Schedule ==
Date	Opponent	Site	Result	Attendance	Source
October 9	Multnomah Athletic Club*	Hayward Field; Eugene, OR	W 7–0		
October 23	Idaho	Hayward Field; Eugene, OR	W 13–7		
October 30	at Stanford	Stanford Field; Stanford, CA	L 0–10		
November 13	Washington	Hayward Field; Eugene, OR (rivalry)	W 17–0	5,000	
November 20	at Oregon Agricultural	Bell Field; Corvallis, OR (rivalry)	T 0–0		
November 25	at USC*	Tournament Park; Pasadena, CA	L 0–21	20,000	
*Non-conference game
