= 1920 Washington State Cougars football team =

American college football season

1920 Washington State Cougars football

Northwest Conference champion
- Conference: Northwest Conference, Pacific Coast Conference
- Record: 5–1 (3–0 Northwest, 1–1 PCC)
- Head coach: Gus Welch (2nd season)
- Captain: Fred Hamilton
- Home stadium: Rogers Field

1920 Northwest Conference football standings
	Conf.					Overall
Team	W		L		T	W		L		T
Washington State $	3	–	0	–	0	5	–	1	–	0
Oregon	1	–	0	–	1	3	–	2	–	1
Whitman	2	–	1	–	0	3	–	2	–	0
Idaho	2	–	2	–	0	4	–	2	–	0
Oregon Agricultural	0	–	1	–	1	2	–	2	–	2
Willamette	0	–	1	–	0	3	–	1	–	1
Montana	0	–	3	–	0	4	–	3	–	0
$ – Conference champion

1920 Pacific Coast Conference football standings
	Conf.					Overall
Team	W		L		T	W		L		T
California $	3	–	0	–	0	9	–	0	–	0
Stanford	2	–	1	–	0	4	–	3	–	0
Washington State	1	–	1	–	0	5	–	1	–	0
Oregon	1	–	1	–	1	3	–	2	–	1
Oregon Agricultural	1	–	2	–	1	2	–	2	–	2
Washington	0	–	3	–	0	1	–	5	–	0
$ – Conference champion

The 1920 Washington State Cougars football team represented Washington State College—now known as Washington State University—as a member of the Northwest Conference and the Pacific Coast Conference (PCC) during the 1920 college football season. Led by second-year head coach Gus Welch, the Cougars compiled an overall record of 5–1. Washington State had a record of 3–0 in Northwest Conference play, winning the conference title, and 1–1 against PCC opponents, tying for third place. This year marked the team's adoption of the "Cougars" nickname.

== Schedule ==
Date	Opponent	Site	Result	Attendance	Source
October 9	at Gonzaga*	Spokane, WA	W 35–0	3,000	
October 15	at Idaho	MacLean Field; Moscow, ID (rivalry)	W 14–7	5,000	
October 30	Montana	Rogers Field; Pullman, WA	W 31–0	5,000	
November 6	at California	California Field; Berkeley, CA	L 0–49	20,000	
November 13	Oregon Agricultural	Rogers Field; Pullman, WA	W 28–0	3,000	
November 25	at Nebraska*	Nebraska Field; Lincoln, NE	W 21–20	10,000	
*Non-conference game
