= 1920 Montana State Bobcats football team =

American college football season

1920 Montana State Bobcats football
- Conference: Rocky Mountain Conference
- Record: 4–1–1 (0–0–1 RMC)
- Head coach: D. V. Graves (1st season)
- Home stadium: Roundup Stadium

1920 Rocky Mountain Conference football standings
| | Conf. | | | | | Overall |
| Team | W | | L | | T | W | | L | | T |
|---|---|---|---|---|---|---|---|---|---|---|
| Colorado Agricultural $ | 6 | – | 0 | – | 1 | 6 | – | 1 | – | 1 |
| Colorado College | 4 | – | 1 | – | 1 | 5 | – | 1 | – | 1 |
| Colorado | 3 | – | 1 | – | 2 | 4 | – | 1 | – | 2 |
| Utah Agricultural | 2 | – | 1 | – | 1 | 4 | – | 2 | – | 1 |
| Denver | 2 | – | 4 | – | 0 | 2 | – | 4 | – | 0 |
| Utah | 1 | – | 2 | – | 1 | 1 | – | 5 | – | 1 |
| Wyoming | 2 | – | 5 | – | 1 | 4 | – | 5 | – | 1 |
| Colorado Mines | 0 | – | 6 | – | 0 | 0 | – | 6 | – | 0 |
| Montana State | 0 | – | 0 | – | 1 | 4 | – | 1 | – | 1 |
$ – Conference champion

The 1920 Montana State Bobcats football team was an American football team that represented Montana State College (later renamed Montana State University) in the Rocky Mountain Conference (RMC) during the 1920 college football season. In its first season under head coach D. V. Graves, the team compiled a 4–1–1 record (0–0–1 against RMC opponents) and outscored all opponents by a total of 62 to 41.

== Schedule ==
| Date | Opponent | Site | Result | Source |
|---|---|---|---|---|
| October 9 | Montana Wesleyan* | Roundup Stadium; Bozeman, MT | W 17–7 | |
| October 16 | at Montana Mines* | Columbia Gardens; Butte, MT | W 7–6 | |
| October 23 | Utah Agricultural | Roundup Stadium; Bozeman, MT | T 0–0 | |
| October 30 | Gonzaga* | Roundup Stadium; Bozeman, MT | W 3–0 | |
| November 6 | Mount St. Charles* | Roundup Stadium; Bozeman, MT | W 35–0 | |
| November 13 | at Montana* | Dornblaser Field; Missoula, MT (rivalry) | L 0–28 | |
*Non-conference game
