= Altrusa International =

American nonprofit organization

Altrusa International, Inc.
- Formation: April 11, 1917; 109 years ago
- Founder: Dr. Alfred Durham
- Type: Non-profit service club
- Headquarters: One North LaSalle Street
- Location: Chicago, Illinois, U.S.
- Services: Literacy, community service, leadership development
- International President: Christine DeVlieger (2025–2027)
- Subsidiaries: Altrusa International Foundation; ASTRA Clubs
- Website: www.altrusa.org

Altrusa International, Inc. (Altrusa) is an international non-profit organization focused on community service. It was founded in Nashville, Tennessee, in 1917 by Dr. Alfred Durham as a chain of national clubs for business and professional women.

== History ==
Altrusa International was founded in Nashville, Tennessee, in 1917, originally as Altrusa Institute. During that time, a record number of women were going to work during World War I, and there was a need for women's civic organizations. Dr. Alfred Durham, a member of Kiwanis, began organizing clubs throughout Nashville, Louisville, Kentucky, and Dayton, Ohio, before he moved on to Indianapolis, Indiana, where he met Mamie L. Bass. Bass had served as the superintendent of the Women's Division of the United States Employment Services, and was a partner in her brother's architecture firm. She also assisted him in organizing a Rotary chapter in Indianapolis. While she admired Durham's Institute, Bass felt that Altrusa could serve a higher purpose. In June 1918, when Altrusa held its first convention in Indianapolis, Bass's vision became reality. The Altrusa Institute became a classified service organization for women.

Later, the Altrusa Institute was renamed as the National Association of Altrusa Clubs and adopted By-Laws that laid the groundwork for today's Altrusans. Soon after, Bass created the Principles of Altrusa which defined Altrusa as "a builder of women" and an organization based on merit and accomplishment. The Principles were officially adopted in 1921 along with a major club building effort. By 1922, Altrusa had 20 clubs.

In 1935, Altrusa became international when the first club in Mexico was organized. In 1937 its first convention outside the United States took place in Cuernavaca, Mexico. Since that first step over US borders in 1935, Altrusa moved into Puerto Rico, Chile, Ecuador, Mexico, India, Korea, Russia, Ukraine, Ireland, Great Britain, Bermuda, Canada, and New Zealand. In 1946, Altrusa sent its first representative to the United Nations.

By 1950, Altrusa had 266 clubs with 28,600 women executives and professional leaders as members.

In 1957, the organization had clubs in eight countries. Its program for service for 1957–1959, based on a survey of clubs, focused on traffic safety, expanded services for older people, and the need for youth guidance to reduce delinquency.

In 1962, Altrusa International established the Altrusa International Foundation, which is dedicated to improving economic well-being and quality of life through a commitment to community services and literacy. In 1966, the organization began to look to America's youth as the future of Altrusa and established ASTRA service clubs. ASTRA encourages young people, ages 13 to 21, to participate in community service. Expanding on its commitment to youth, Altrusa adopted literacy as an ongoing area of service in 1977.

In 1963, Altrusa had over 500 clubs in ten countries. The 1963–1965 program called for expanded vocational services to youth and older workers, more international relations programs and projects, and increased efforts to conserve human resources at all ages.

The 1980s and 1990s brought changes to Altrusa. With the end of Communism, the former Soviet Union saw its first Altrusa clubs. Increasing its global outlook, Altrusa expanded projects beyond literacy and education by adopting a resolution to promote environmental concerns in 1989.

In 2011, the association launched a new branding and marketing campaign with the purpose of increasing Altrusa's image in the communities, and reaching out to an evolving membership.

== Presidents of Altrusa ==
Altrusa published a retrospective of its early years in 1933, and listed the following women as its first eleven national presidents:

- Mamie L. Bass (1917 to 1918)elev
- Morna Hickam (1918 to 1919)
- Bessie D. Moore (1919 to 1920)
- Mary M. Buehler (1921 to 1924; two terms)
- Anna H. Settle (1922 to 1923)
- Gillette Hayden (1924 to 1925)
- Amanda H. Heppner (1925 to 1927)
- Margaret R. Turner (1927 to 1928)
- Helen Johnston, (1928 to 1930)
- Elizabeth F. Gardner (1930 to 1931)
- Janette B. Briggs (1931 to 1933)

=== Later presidents ===
- Ruth Kramer (1949 to 1951)
- Lena C. Clauve (1951 to 1953)
- Gretchen Vanderschmidt (1953 to 1955)
- Erma B. Christy (1955 to 1957)

== Current status ==
As of October 2017, Altrusa had around 8,000 members in 313 clubs from 13 countries, including Canada, New Zealand, and the United States. It is an official observer to the United Nations, and an NGO with consultative status on the Roster of ECOSOC. At the end of October 2016, a new club was chartered in Bangalore, India. The International President was in attendance to present the charter, initiate the new members and install the board of directors. In July 2017 Altrusa International, Inc. celebrated its centennial year at its biennial convention in Nashville, Tennessee. It had a record attendance with around 700 attendees, almost 10% of the membership.
