= 1920 Utah Utes football team =

American college football season

1920 Utah Utes football
- Conference: Rocky Mountain Conference
- Record: 1–5–1 (1–2–1 RMC)
- Head coach: Thomas M. Fitzpatrick (2nd season)
- Home stadium: Cummings Field

1920 Rocky Mountain Conference football standings
	Conf.					Overall
Team	W		L		T	W		L		T
Colorado Agricultural $	6	–	0	–	1	6	–	1	–	1
Colorado College	4	–	1	–	1	5	–	1	–	1
Colorado	3	–	1	–	2	4	–	1	–	2
Utah Agricultural	2	–	1	–	1	4	–	2	–	1
Denver	2	–	4	–	0	2	–	4	–	0
Utah	1	–	2	–	1	1	–	5	–	1
Wyoming	2	–	5	–	1	4	–	5	–	1
Colorado Mines	0	–	6	–	0	0	–	6	–	0
Montana State	0	–	0	–	1	4	–	1	–	1
$ – Conference champion

The 1920 Utah Utes football team was an American football team that represented the University of Utah as a member of the Rocky Mountain Conference (RMC) during the 1920 college football season. In their second season under head coach Thomas M. Fitzpatrick, the Utes compiled an overall record of 1–5–1 record with a mark of 1–2–1 in conference play and were outscored by a total of 116 to 19.

== Schedule ==
Date	Opponent	Site	Result	Source
October 16	at Colorado College	Washburn Field; Colorado Springs, CO	L 2–20	
October 23	at California*	California Field; Berkeley, CA	L 0–63	
October 30	Nevada*	Cummings Field; Salt Lake City, UT	L 7–14	
November 6	at Colorado	Gamble Field; Boulder, CO (rivalry)	W 7–0	
November 11	vs. Idaho*	State fairgrounds; Boise, ID	L 0–10	
November 20	Wyoming	Cummings Field; Salt Lake City, UT	T 0–0	
November 25	Utah Agricultural	Cummings Field; Salt Lake City, UT (rivalry)	L 3–9	
*Non-conference game
