= 1920 Chico State Wildcats football team =

American college football season

1920 Chico State Wildcats football
- Conference: Independent
- Record: 3–3
- Head coach: Luther Clements (1st season)
- Home stadium: College Field

1920 Western college football independents records
	Conf.			Overall
Team	W	L	T	W		L		T
Nevada		–		7	–	3	–	1
USC		–		6	–	0	–	0
Arizona		–		6	–	1	–	0
Hawaii		–		6	–	2	–	0
New Mexico A&M		–		5	–	1	–	1
Santa Clara		–		5	–	1	–	0
Gonzaga		–		4	–	3	–	0
Chico State		–		3	–	3	–	0
New Mexico		–		3	–	3	–	0
University Farm		–		3	–	4	–	0
Pacific (CA)		–		1	–	2	–	1
Saint Mary's		–		0	–	3	–	0

The 1920 Chico State Wildcats football team represented Chico State Teachers College—now known as California State University, Chico—as an independent during the 1920 college football season. The 1920 Wildcats had no formal head coach for the first three games of the season. Luther Clements was head coach for the last three games. Chico State finished the season with a record of 3–3. The Wildcats were outscored by their opponents 95–117 for the season. They played home games at College Field in Chico, California.

== Schedule ==
Date	Opponent	Site	Result
	Corning High School (CA)	College Field; Chico, CA	W 53–0
	at Sacramento High School	Sacramento, CA	L 0–53
	at Willows High School (CA)	Willows, CA	L 7–37
	Richmond High School	College Field; Chico, CA	W 29–13
	at Richmond High School	Richmond, CA	W 6–0
November 25	Chico High School	College Field; Chico, CA	L 0–14
