= 1920 Utah Agricultural Aggies football team =

American college football season

1920 Utah Agricultural Aggies football
- Conference: Rocky Mountain Conference
- Record: 4–2–1 (2–1–1 RMC)
- Head coach: Dick Romney (2nd season)
- Home stadium: Adams Field

1920 Rocky Mountain Conference football standings
	Conf.					Overall
Team	W		L		T	W		L		T
Colorado Agricultural $	6	–	0	–	1	6	–	1	–	1
Colorado College	4	–	1	–	1	5	–	1	–	1
Colorado	3	–	1	–	2	4	–	1	–	2
Utah Agricultural	2	–	1	–	1	4	–	2	–	1
Denver	2	–	4	–	0	2	–	4	–	0
Utah	1	–	2	–	1	1	–	5	–	1
Wyoming	2	–	5	–	1	4	–	5	–	1
Colorado Mines	0	–	6	–	0	0	–	6	–	0
Montana State	0	–	0	–	1	4	–	1	–	1
$ – Conference champion

The 1920 Utah Agricultural Aggies football team was an American football team that represented Utah Agricultural College (later renamed Utah State University) in the Rocky Mountain Conference (RMC) during the 1920 college football season. In their second season under head coach Dick Romney, the Aggies compiled a 4–2–1 record (2–1–1 against RMC opponents), placed fourth in the conference, and outscored all opponents by a total of 84 to 48.

== Schedule ==
Date	Opponent	Site	Result	Source
October 9	at Ogden Athletic Association	Ogden, UT	W 21–0	
October 16	Colorado Mines	Adams Field; Logan, UT	W 27–3	
October 23	at Montana State	Bozeman, MT	T 0–0	
October 30	Colorado Agricultural	Adams Field; Logan, UT	L 0–21	
November 6	at Nevada	Mackay Field; Reno, NV	L 0–21	
November 13	Montana Mines	Adams Field; Logan, UT	W 27–0	
November 25	at Utah	Cummings Field; Salt Lake City, UT (rivalry)	W 9–3	
