= 1920 New Mexico A&M Aggies football team =

American college football season

1920 New Mexico A&M Aggies football
- Conference: Independent
- Record: 5–1–1
- Head coach: Dutch Bergman (1st season)
- Home stadium: Miller Field

1920 Western college football independents records
	Conf.			Overall
Team	W	L	T	W		L		T
Nevada		–		7	–	3	–	1
USC		–		6	–	0	–	0
Arizona		–		6	–	1	–	0
Hawaii		–		6	–	2	–	0
New Mexico A&M		–		5	–	1	–	1
Santa Clara		–		5	–	1	–	0
Gonzaga		–		4	–	3	–	0
Chico State		–		3	–	3	–	0
New Mexico		–		3	–	3	–	0
University Farm		–		3	–	4	–	0
Pacific (CA)		–		1	–	2	–	1
Saint Mary's		–		0	–	3	–	0

The 1920 New Mexico A&M Aggies football team was an American football team that represented New Mexico College of Agriculture and Mechanical Arts (now known as New Mexico State University) during the 1920 college football season. In their first year under head coach Dutch Bergman, the Aggies compiled a 5–1–1 record and outscored all opponents by a total of 159 to 62. The team played its home games on Miller Field.

== Schedule ==
Date	Opponent	Site	Result	Attendance	Source
October 2	8th Cavalry, Fort Bliss	Miller Field; Las Cruces, NM	W 19–0		
October 9	Quartermaster Corps, Fort Bliss	Miller Field; Las Cruces, NM	W 27–0		
October 16	New Mexico Mines	Miller Field; Las Cruces, NM	W 80–0		
October 23	at New Mexico Military	Roswell, NM	T 7–7		
November 5	at Arizona	Varsity Field; Tucson, AZ	L 0–41	2,500	
November 11	at Texas Mines	El Paso HS Stadium; El Paso, TX (rivalry)	W 12–7		
November 25	New Mexico	Miller Field; Las Cruces, NM (rivalry)	W 14–7		
