= Gus Welch =

American football player and coach

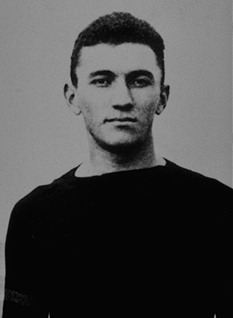
- Welch during his college football days at Carlisle

Profile
- Position: Quarterback

Personal information
- Born: December 18, 1892; Spooner, Wisconsin, U.S.
- Died: January 29, 1970 (aged 77); Bedford, Virginia, U.S.
- Listed height: 5 ft 11 in (1.80 m)
- Listed weight: 152 lb (69 kg)

Career information
- College: Carlisle Indian; Dickinson

Career history

Playing
- 1912–1914: Canton Professionals
- 1915–1917: Canton Bulldogs

Coaching
- 1919–1922: Washington State
- 1923–1928: Randolph Macon
- 1930–1932: Virginia
- 1933–1934: Haskell
- 1937–1938: American

Awards and highlights
- 3x Ohio League champion (1915, 1916, 1917); American Indian Athletic Hall of Fame (1973); Second Team All-American Quarterback (1913); Ranked as 1 of the 3 best quarterbacks in the USA (1913)
- College Football Hall of Fame

Other information
- Military career
- Allegiance: United States
- Branch: U.S. Army
- Service years: 1917–1919
- Rank: Captain
- Unit: American Expeditionary Forces
- Conflicts: World War I

Gustavius A. "Gus" Welch (December 18, 1892 – January 29, 1970) was an American football player, track and field athlete, coach of football and lacrosse, and college athletics administrator.

== Early life ==
Welch was a full-blood Chippewa born in Spooner, Wisconsin. He attended the Carlisle Indian School, located in Carlisle, Pennsylvania and graduated in 1911. Gus was one of Carlisle's first honor students. While at Carlisle, Welch was the quarterback for the school’s football team, which featured Jim Thorpe and was coached by Pop Warner. He was a member of the USA Track and Field team during the 1912 Summer Olympics, although an illness prevented him from competing. After 1912, Welch played professional football for the Canton Bulldogs, coached by Thorpe. In 1917, Welch graduated from the Dickinson School of Law.

== Military ==
In 1917, he entered the American Expeditionary Force during World War I as a Second Lieutenant, 808th Pioneer Infantry, under John J. Pershing. During his time in the military he achieved the rank of captain. He left the service in 1919.

== Coaching career ==
From 1923 to 1929, Welch was the athletic director and head football coach at Randolph Macon College. From 1930 to 1934, he served as the head lacrosse coach at the University of Virginia. From 1935 until 1937, Welch served as the director of athletics and head football coach at Haskell Indian Nations University, located in Lawrence, Kansas. Afterwards he served as the head coach at Georgetown Prep School. From 1937 to 1938, he served as head football coach at American University where he compiled an overall record of two wins, ten losses and one tie.

During World War II he was in charge of Physical Fitness at Georgetown University; and by 1947 taught physical education at Lyndon Hill Junior High School, located in Prince George County, Virginia.

== Camps ==
In 1929, Welch purchased a boys' camp near the Peaks of the Otter in Bedford County, Virginia, which he operated during the next 30 summers as Camp Kewanzee for young people. In 1939, some of his land was condemned by the US Department of the Interior to extend the Blue Ridge Parkway, a seizure Welch fought vigorously. He then purchased a farm near Bedford, Virginia, and continued to work with young athletes. Gus finally served as athletic director at American University in Washington, D.C. prior to his 1970 death.

== Honors ==
In 1973, Welch was named to the American Indian Athletic Hall of Fame and in 1975 to National Football Foundation's College Football Hall of Fame. In the late 1960s, Welch's help was sought by both the Jim Thorpe Project of Carlisle, Pennsylvania, and the Jim Thorpe Athletic Award Committee of Yale, Oklahoma.

== Family ==
In 1923, Welch married Julia Carter, daughter of Charles David Carter, Oklahoma Congressman from Boggy Depot. A Chickasaw, Carter descended from David Carter, a white man captured in Connecticut and raised as an Indian who elected to remain with them as an adult, married an Indian woman, and for a time edited The Phoenix, an Indian newspaper. The Welchs had no children but adopted a niece, Serena, who became the model for the figure portrayed on the canning labels of Pocahontas Foods.

Carter's family was also close to Vinnie Ream, after whom Vinita, Oklahoma is named. Ream became a sculptor of several statues in Washington, D.C., including one of Abraham Lincoln placed in the United States Capitol rotunda.

== Death ==
Welch died on January 29, 1970, of a heart attack, at Bedford Memorial Hospital in Bedford, Virginia.

== Head coaching record ==
=== Football ===
Year	Team	Overall	Conference	Standing	Bowl/playoffs
Washington State Cougars (Northwest Conference / Pacific Coast Conference) (1919–1922)
1919	Washington State	5–2	3–1 / 2–2	1st / T–3rd	
1920	Washington State	5–1	3–0 / 1–1	1st / T–3rd	
1921	Washington State	4–2–1	2–0–1 / 2–1–1	2nd / 2nd	
1922	Washington State	2–5	1–3 / 1–5	6th / 7th	
Washington State:		16–10–1	11–9–1		
Randolph–Macon Yellow Jackets (Independent) (1923–1926)
1923	Randolph–Macon	0–8			
1924	Randolph–Macon	1–6–2			
1925	Randolph–Macon	0–8			
1926	Randolph–Macon	1–7			
Randolph–Macon Yellow Jackets (Virginia Conference) (1927–1928)
1927	Randolph–Macon	2–3	1–2	5th	
1928	Randolph–Macon	0–7–1	0–4–1	8th	
Randolph–Macon:		4–39–3	1–6–1		
Haskell Indians (Independent) (1933–1934)
1933	Haskell	2–6–3			
1934	Haskell	3–6–1			
Haskell:		5–12–4			
American Eagles (Independent) (1937–1938)
1937	American	1–6–1			
1938	American	1–4			
American:		2–10–1			
Total:		27–71–9			
National championship Conference title Conference division title or championship game berth
