= 1920 Colorado Agricultural Aggies football team =

American college football season

1920 Colorado Agricultural Aggies football

RMC champion
- Conference: Rocky Mountain Conference
- Record: 6–1–1 (6–0–1 RMC)
- Head coach: Harry W. Hughes (10th season)
- Home stadium: Colorado Field

1920 Rocky Mountain Conference football standings
	Conf.					Overall
Team	W		L		T	W		L		T
Colorado Agricultural $	6	–	0	–	1	6	–	1	–	1
Colorado College	4	–	1	–	1	5	–	1	–	1
Colorado	3	–	1	–	2	4	–	1	–	2
Utah Agricultural	2	–	1	–	1	4	–	2	–	1
Denver	2	–	4	–	0	2	–	4	–	0
Utah	1	–	2	–	1	1	–	5	–	1
Wyoming	2	–	5	–	1	4	–	5	–	1
Colorado Mines	0	–	6	–	0	0	–	6	–	0
Montana State	0	–	0	–	1	4	–	1	–	1
$ – Conference champion

The 1920 Colorado Agricultural Aggies football team represented Colorado Agricultural College (now known as Colorado State University) in the Rocky Mountain Conference (RMC) during the 1920 college football season. In their tenth season under head coach Harry W. Hughes, the Aggies compiled a 6–1–1 record (6–0–1 against RMC opponents), won the RMC championship, and outscored all opponents by a total of 152 to 14.

Five Colorado Agricultural players received all-conference honors in 1920: fullback Harry Scott, tackle H.L. (Hap) Dotson, halfback Duane Hartshorn, end Charles Bresnahan, and guard Roy Ratekin.

== Schedule ==
Date	Opponent	Site	Result	Source
October 2	at Wyoming	Laramie, WY (rivalry)	W 13–0	
October 9	at Nebraska*	Nebraska Field; Lincoln, NE	L 0–7	
October 16	Wyoming	Colorado Field; Fort Collins, CO	W 42–0	
October 23	Colorado Mines	Colorado Field; Fort Collins, CO	W 27–0	
October 30	at Utah Agricultural	Adams Field; Logan, UT	W 21–0	
November 11	Colorado College	Colorado Field; Fort Collins, CO	W 28–0	
November 20	at Colorado	Gamble Field; Boulder, CO (rivalry)	T 7–7	
November 25	at Denver	Broadway Park; Denver, CO	W 14–0	
*Non-conference game
