= 1920 Gonzaga Blue and White football team =

American college football season

1920 Gonzaga Blue and White football
- Conference: Independent
- Record: 4–3
- Head coach: Gus Dorais (1st season)
- Home stadium: Fairgrounds

1920 Western college football independents records
	Conf.			Overall
Team	W	L	T	W		L		T
Nevada		–		7	–	3	–	1
USC		–		6	–	0	–	0
Arizona		–		6	–	1	–	0
Hawaii		–		6	–	2	–	0
New Mexico A&M		–		5	–	1	–	1
Santa Clara		–		5	–	1	–	0
Gonzaga		–		4	–	3	–	0
Chico State		–		3	–	3	–	0
New Mexico		–		3	–	3	–	0
University Farm		–		3	–	4	–	0
Pacific (CA)		–		1	–	2	–	1
Saint Mary's		–		0	–	3	–	0

The 1920 Gonzaga Blue and White football team was an American football team that represented Gonzaga University during the 1920 college football season. In their first year under head coach Gus Dorais, the Blue and White compiled a 4–3 record and outscored their opponents by a total of 164 to 55.

Gus Dorais was hired as Gonzaga's athletic director in May 1920. He had previously served as the head baseball coach at Notre Dame and as an assistant football coach under Knute Rockne. Rockne and Dorais led the 1919 Notre Dame football team to a perfect 9–0 record. As teammates on the undefeated 1913 Notre Dame football team, Dorais and Rockne were credited with popularizing the forward pass.

== Schedule ==
Date	Opponent	Site	Result	Attendance	Source
October 9	Washington State	Spokane, WA	L 0–35	3,000	
October 23	Bremerton Navy Yard	Spokane, WA	W 63–0		
October 30	at Montana State	Gatton Field; Bozeman, MT	L 0–3		
November 6	at Multnomah Athletic Club	Multnomah Field; Portland, OR	W 20–0		
November 11	Camp Lewis	Fairgrounds; Spokane, WA	W 27–0		
November 20	at Montana Mines	Columbia Gardens; Butte, MT	W 47–7		
November 27	Idaho	Fairgrounds field; Spokane, WA (rivalry)	L 7–10		
