= Roy W. Johnson (coach) =

American basketball, baseball, football player and coach and administrator

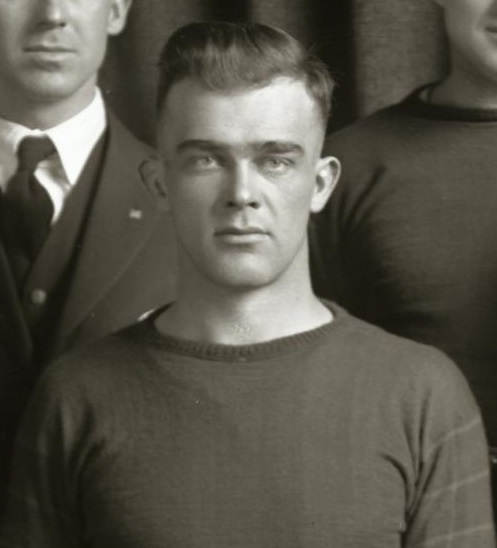
- Johnson, cropped from 1919 Michigan Wolverines football team portrait

Biographical details
- Born: September 6, 1892; Grand Rapids, Michigan, U.S.
- Died: September 20, 1989 (aged 97); New Mexico, U.S.

Playing career

Football
- 1916: Michigan
- 1919: Michigan
- Positions: Center, guard

Coaching career (HC unless noted)

Football
- 1920–1930: New Mexico

Basketball
- 1919–1931: New Mexico
- 1933–1940: New Mexico

Baseball
- 1921–1929: New Mexico

Administrative career (AD unless noted)
- 1920–1949: New Mexico

Head coaching record
- Overall: 41–32–6 (football); 165–146 (basketball); 5–3 (baseball)

Roy William Johnson (September 6, 1892 – September 20, 1989), nicknamed "Old Ironhead," was an American football player, coach of football, basketball, and baseball, and college athletics administrator. He served in various capacities in the athletics program at the University of New Mexico for nearly 40 years. He was the university's athletic director from 1920 to 1949, head football coach from 1920 to 1930, and head basketball coach from 1920 to 1931 and 1933 to 1940. He also coached New Mexico's track and tennis teams. In 1957, the university named the newly built Johnson Gymnasium in his honor.

== Early years in Michigan ==
Johnson was born in Grand Rapids, Michigan, the son of Swedish immigrants. He enrolled at the University of Michigan in the fall of 1915, where he played football under head coach Fielding H. Yost. He played at the tackle position in 1916 and 1919, and started two games at center and one game at guard for the 1919 Michigan Wolverines football team.

Johnson was a middle distance runner for the Michigan track team. He established several records in the quarter mile event and led the Michigan mile relay team to victory at the 1917 Drake Relays. Johnson was also a first baseman on the Michigan baseball team. Johnson became the national light heavyweight intercollegiate champion in the "Collegiate Physical Efficiency Competitions," a decathlon style event emphasizing strength and running, defeating a competitor from Yale in the 1916 finals.

== World War I ==
Johnson's collegiate career was interrupted by military service during World War I. He served in France, where he was exposed to phosgene gas and spent several months rehabilitating in a French Hospital.

== University of New Mexico ==
After graduating from the University of Michigan in 1920, Johnson moved to New Mexico, where he hoped that the dry, warm climate would assist him in overcoming respiratory difficulties dating back to his wartime exposure to phosgene gas. He served as the athletic director at the University of New Mexico from 1920 to 1949. He became "the one-man physical education department" at a university that, in 1920, had only 227 students and no gymnasium or football field. For nearly 40 years, he served in multiple other positions, including head coach of the football, basketball, track and tennis teams, and an instructor of physical education. The Albuquerque Tribune later wrote: "For year after year Roy Johnson was the entire athletic coaching staff at the University. He coached football, basketball, track and tennis in addition to carrying a full teaching load." In addition to coaching and teaching, Johnson was also assigned "the dubious task of building collegiate-level athletics facilities, many times doing the hard labor with his own hands." He oversaw construction of Carlisle Gymnasium in 1928 and Zimmerman Field in 1938, the first football stadium at UNM.

Johnson was the head football coach at the University of New Mexico from 1920 to 1930, compiling a record of 41–32–6. His 1927 team went 8–0–1, surrendering just 28 points. In 1929, he became the first football coach to have his team fly by airplane, for a game with Occidental College at the Rose Bowl, the first night game played by the Lobos. During the early 1930s, he became an innovator in the use of arc lights to allow night games at UNM. In 1931, New Mexico joined the Border Conference as a founding member under the direction of Johnson and University of Arizona coach Pop McKale.

Johnson was also the coach of the New Mexico basketball team from 1920 to 1931 and 1933 to 1940. Basketball had been a varsity sport at UNM since 1899, but the team played only sporadic games. Beginning in 1922, Johnson established a regular schedule of games against other New Mexico colleges and the University of Arizona, and further regional schools were soon added. From 1924 to 1934, his teams compiled an impressive record of 104–38 (.732). Overall, in 18 years as the school's basketball coach, he compiled a record of 165–146 (.531). His win total stood as the school record for over thirty years and is currently third on its all-time list.

For his many contributions, Johnson has been called the "architect of institutional sport and physical education in the American Southwest with particular application to The University of New Mexico." In 1957, the University of New Mexico regents voted to name the university's new gymnasium the Johnson Gymnasium in his honor. Sports Illustrated reported on the naming of the gymnasium as follows:

Not often has a coach received so unique an honor as has Roy Johnson. While still a member of the faculty at the University of New Mexico he has had a modern, $2.5 million gymnasium and swimming pool named after him. But New Mexico's regard for Roy Johnson had been building up since 1920... The athletic program Coach Johnson built with Swedish determination has won him the admiration and affection of his students and co-workers and the nickname Ironhead.

At the time of the gymnasium dedication, The Albuquerque Tribune wrote that his career at New Mexico made him "one of the best known figures of the southwest" and added:

Roy Johnson was a stern taskmaster. He believed in hard work and physical fitness. His athletes often groaned but in after years they thanked Johnson for what he had done for them. Johnson built character as well as muscle in the men he coached.

== Family and later years ==
Johnson and his wife, Clyda, had two sons, Steffen Roy William Johnson (born April 1923) and Edwin F. Johnson, and a daughter, Coral Johnson. At the time of the 1940 United States census, they lived at 1815 Roma Avenue in Albuquerque, New Mexico, a spot that is now on the UNM campus between the University House and the duck pond. Johnson continued to live in New Mexico in his later years and was inducted into the New Mexico Sports Hall of Fame in 1974. He died in New Mexico in 1989 at age 97.

== Head coaching record ==
=== Football ===
Year	Team	Overall	Conference	Standing	Bowl/playoffs
New Mexico Lobos (Independent) (1920–1930)
1920	New Mexico	3–3			
1921	New Mexico	2–2			
1922	New Mexico	3–4			
1923	New Mexico	3–5			
1924	New Mexico	5–1			
1925	New Mexico	2–4–1			
1926	New Mexico	4–2–1			
1927	New Mexico	8–0–1			
1928	New Mexico	5–2–1			
1929	New Mexico	2–4–2			
1930	New Mexico	4–5			
New Mexico:		41–32–6			
Total:		41–32–6			

=== Basketball ===
Record table
Season	Team	Overall	Conference	Standing	Postseason
New Mexico Lobos (Independent) (1920–1931)
1919–20	New Mexico	0–3			
1921–22	New Mexico	0–2			
1922–23	New Mexico	2–7			
1923–24	New Mexico	5–3			
1924–25	New Mexico	12–1			
1925–26	New Mexico	12–2			
1926–27	New Mexico	13–4			
1927–28	New Mexico	12–7			
1928–29	New Mexico	14–9			
1929–30	New Mexico	16–4			
1930–31	New Mexico	9–7			
New Mexico Lobos (Border Conference) (1933–1940)
1933–34	New Mexico	16–4	6–4	3rd	
1934–35	New Mexico	10–10	7–9	3rd	
1935–36	New Mexico	16–10	11–9	4th	
1936–37	New Mexico	12–14	10–10	4th	
1937–38	New Mexico	9–16	6–10	5th	
1938–39	New Mexico	4–21	4–16	7th	
1939–40	New Mexico	3–22	2–14	6th	
New Mexico:		165–146	46–72		
Total:		165–146			

== Other sources ==
- Old Iron Head; a short biography of Roy William Johnson, dean of New Mexico's physical education and athletics (1963), a thesis dissertation by Robert K. Barney
