= 1920 Arizona Wildcats football team =

American college football season

1920 Arizona Wildcats football
- Conference: Independent
- Record: 6–1
- Head coach: Pop McKale (6th season)
- Captain: Alter Louis Slonaker
- Home stadium: Varsity Field

1920 Western college football independents records
| | Conf. | | | Overall |
| Team | W | L | T | W | | L | | T |
|---|---|---|---|---|---|---|---|---|
| Nevada | | – | | 7 | – | 3 | – | 1 |
| USC | | – | | 6 | – | 0 | – | 0 |
| Arizona | | – | | 6 | – | 1 | – | 0 |
| Hawaii | | – | | 6 | – | 2 | – | 0 |
| New Mexico A&M | | – | | 5 | – | 1 | – | 1 |
| Santa Clara | | – | | 5 | – | 1 | – | 0 |
| Gonzaga | | – | | 4 | – | 3 | – | 0 |
| Chico State | | – | | 3 | – | 3 | – | 0 |
| New Mexico | | – | | 3 | – | 3 | – | 0 |
| University Farm | | – | | 3 | – | 4 | – | 0 |
| Pacific (CA) | | – | | 1 | – | 2 | – | 1 |
| Saint Mary's | | – | | 0 | – | 3 | – | 0 |

The 1920 Arizona Wildcats football team represented the University of Arizona as an independent during the 1920 college football season. In their sixth season under head coach Pop McKale, the Wildcats compiled a 6–1 record and outscored their opponents, 381 to 65. The team captain was Alter Louis Slonaker.

== Schedule ==
| Date | Opponent | Site | Result | Source |
|---|---|---|---|---|
| October 9 | Phoenix Indian Training School | Varsity Field; Tucson, AZ | W 51–20 | |
| October 16 | Camp Harry J. Jones | Varsity Field; Tucson, AZ | W 167–0 | |
| October 30 | at Texas Mines | El Paso, TX | W 60–7 | |
| November 5 | New Mexico A&M | Varsity Field; Tucson, AZ | W 41–0 | |
| November 13 | at Pomona | Claremont, CA | L 0–31 | |
| November 20 | New Mexico | Varsity Field; Tucson, AZ (rivalry) | W 28–7 | |
| November 25 | Redlands | Varsity Field; Tucson, AZ | W 34–0 | |
