= Raymond Elliot =

American football coach

Coaching career (HC unless noted)
- 1920: Hawaii

Head coaching record
- Overall: 6–2

Raymond Elliot was an American football coach. He served as the head coach at the University of Hawaii during the 1920 season.

== Head coaching record ==
| Year | Team | Overall | Conference | Standing | Bowl/playoffs |
|---|---|---|---|---|---|
Hawaii Deans (Independent) (1920)
| 1920 | Hawaii | 6–2 | | | |
| Hawaii: | | 6–2 | | | |
| Total: | | 6–2 | | | |
