= Lena Clauve =

- Born: Lena Cecile Clauve; 1895; Wabash, Indiana
- Died: February 6, 1994 (aged 98–99); Albuquerque, New Mexico
- Education: BA Music Education; MA Education
- Alma mater: University of New Mexico; Columbia University
- Occupations: Music Education Professor; Dean of Women
- Years active: 1929-1961
- Organization: University of New Mexico

Lena Cecile Clauve (1895–1993) was an American professor of music and the first Dean of Women at the University of New Mexico (UNM). Clauve was president of Altrusa International from 1951 to 1953 and served as a board member for six years. She was noted for her development and promotion of women's organizations at UNM. In 1987, she received the New Mexico Distinguished Public Service Award from the governor and the Eleanor Roosevelt Humanitarian Award from Altrusa.

== Early life and education ==
Clauve was born in 1895, the daughter of a cabinet maker, and raised in Wabash, Indiana. She attended Manchester College in North Manchester, Indiana, double majoring in Music and Education. When her mother became ill with tuberculosis, Clauve moved her to Albuquerque. Clauve then transferred to the University of New Mexico in 1923 and graduated in 1925. She earned a master's degree from Columbia University in 1929.

== Career ==
After receiving her bachelor's degree in Music Education in 1925, Clauve returned to Indiana and taught music, becoming the supervisor of music education for Wabash schools. In 1927, a group of University of New Mexico women informed the university's president, Dr. James Zimmerman, that UNM was unaccredited for women students by the American Association of University Women, in particular for lacking a Dean of Women. Zimmerman asked Clauve to attend Columbia University for graduate work in order to become UNM's Dean. She earned a master's degree from the Columbia University Teachers College and completed graduate work at the University of Wisconsin. Then Clauve returned to the University of New Mexico in 1929 as a professor in the music department, an active member of the AAUW, and the school's first Dean of Women.

As a music professor, Clauve co-founded the university's chapter of the national professional music fraternity, Sigma Alpha Iota. In 1932, she composed the music for the closing song of a school variety show, which afterwards became the University Of New Mexico's fight song, Hail, New Mexico. Clauve encouraged the building of a Student Union Center and served on the Student Union Board. She helped develop the building of Scholes Hall and the Zimmerman Library on campus.

While working as a music teacher in Wabash, Indiana in 1928, Clauve had joined the local chapter of Altrusa International. She continued her involvement with Altrusa in New Mexico and, in 1939, was elected as governor of the organization's eighth district comprising Wyoming, Colorado and New Mexico. Ten years later, she was named president-elect of the international organization at its biennial meeting in Banff, Canada and served as the presidency from 1951 to 1953.

During her tenure as the school's Dean of Women from 1929 to 1961, Clauve was noted for her development of women's programs and academic societies at the school. Her first act was to establish the Associated Women Students council and advised them in creating their own campus regulations. In 1936, Clauve founded UNM's chapter of the senior women's honorary society, Mortar Board. Then in 1958, Clauve organized the junior women's honorary society Campanas and the sophomore honorary society, Spurs, serving as a charter member and advisor. She created the UNM chapter of the national honorary education fraternity for women, Pi Lambda Theta, and, in 1931, the Epsilon chapter of the philanthropic social organization for women, Phrateres.

Clauve retired in June 1961 after 32 years at UNM.

== Personal life ==
In 1941, Clauve obtained a 99-year lease on property on the UNM campus and had a house built on it. She died in her sleep at her home on February 6, 1994, at the age of 98.

== Honors ==
The Lena C. Clauve Scholarship Award was established by the Maia chapter of Mortar Board in 1961.

In 1967, Alpha Delta Pi gave Clauve their Alumnus of the Year award at the sorority's national convention.

In 1987, Governor Garrey Carruthers awarded Clauve the Governor's New Mexico Distinguished Public Service Award, the state's highest recognition for public service. Her cited work included being the first Dean of Women at UNM, organization of the Department of Music Education, creation of the Sigma Alpha Iota honorary music program and the Pi Lambda Theta honorary education for women, as well as being Director of the Red Cross.

Clauve received the Eleanor Roosevelt Humanitarian Award from Altrusa International at their International Convention in 1987.
