= 1920 USC Trojans football team =

American college football season

1920 USC Trojans football
- Conference: Independent
- Record: 6–0
- Head coach: Gus Henderson (2nd season)
- Captain: Roy Evans
- Home stadium: Bovard Field

1920 Western college football independents records
	Conf.			Overall
Team	W	L	T	W		L		T
Nevada		–		7	–	3	–	1
USC		–		6	–	0	–	0
Arizona		–		6	–	1	–	0
Hawaii		–		6	–	2	–	0
New Mexico A&M		–		5	–	1	–	1
Santa Clara		–		5	–	1	–	0
Gonzaga		–		4	–	3	–	0
Chico State		–		3	–	3	–	0
New Mexico		–		3	–	3	–	0
University Farm		–		3	–	4	–	0
Pacific (CA)		–		1	–	2	–	1
Saint Mary's		–		0	–	3	–	0

The 1920 USC Trojans football team represented the University of Southern California (USC) in the 1920 college football season. In their second year under head coach Gus Henderson, the Trojans compiled a 6–0 record and outscored their opponents by a combined total of 170 to 21.

== Schedule ==
Date	Opponent	Site	Result	Attendance	Source
October 9	Caltech	Bovard Field; Los Angeles, CA	W 46–7	5,000	
October 16	Stanford	Bovard Field; Los Angeles, CA (rivalry)	W 10–0	8,000	
October 23	Occidental	Bovard Field; Los Angeles, CA	W 48–7		
October 30	at Pomona	Alumni Field; Claremont, CA	W 7–0		
November 13	Nevada	Bovard Field; Los Angeles, CA	W 38–7		
November 25	vs. Oregon	Tournament Park; Pasadena, CA	W 21–0	20,000	
