= 1920 Idaho Vandals football team =

American college football season

1920 Idaho Vandals football
- Conference: Northwest Conference
- Record: 4–2 (2–2 Northwest)
- Head coach: Thomas Kelley (1st season)
- Captain: Felix Plastino
- Home stadium: MacLean Field

1920 Northwest Conference football standings
	Conf.					Overall
Team	W		L		T	W		L		T
Washington State $	3	–	0	–	0	5	–	1	–	0
Oregon	1	–	0	–	1	3	–	2	–	1
Whitman	2	–	1	–	0	3	–	2	–	0
Idaho	2	–	2	–	0	4	–	2	–	0
Oregon Agricultural	0	–	1	–	1	2	–	2	–	2
Willamette	0	–	1	–	0	3	–	1	–	1
Montana	0	–	3	–	0	4	–	3	–	0
$ – Conference champion

The 1920 Idaho Vandals football team represented the University of Idaho as a member of the Northwest Conference during the 1920 college football season. Led by first-year head coach Thomas Kelley, the Vandals compiled an overall record of 4–2 with a mark of 2–2 in conference play, placing fourth in the Northwest Conference. The team played one home game on campus, at MacLean Field in Moscow, Idaho, and one in Boise, Idaho, at the state fairgrounds.

Idaho dropped a sixth consecutive game to Washington State in the Battle of the Palouse, falling, 14–7, in the opener in Moscow. Three years later, the Vandals won the first of three consecutive, their only three-peat in the rivalry series.

After coming up six points short at Oregon to start with two losses, Idaho won its last four games.

== Schedule ==
Date	Opponent	Site	Result	Source
October 15	Washington State^{†}	MacLean Field; Moscow, ID (Battle of the Palouse)	L 7–14	
October 23	at Oregon	Hayward Field; Eugene, OR	L 7–13	
October 30	at Whitman	Ankeny Field; Walla Walla, WA	W 21–7	
November 11	vs. Utah*	State fairgrounds; Boise, ID	W 10–0	
November 20	at Montana	Dornblaser Field; Missoula, MT (rivalry)	W 20–7	
November 27	at Gonzaga*	Fairgrounds field; Spokane, WA (rivalry)	W 10–7	
*Non-conference game; ^{†}Homecoming
