= 1920 Wyoming Cowboys football team =

American college football season

1920 Wyoming Cowboys football
- Conference: Rocky Mountain Conference
- Record: 4–5–1 (2–5–1 RMC)
- Head coach: John Corbett (5th season)
- Captain: Milward Simpson

1920 Rocky Mountain Conference football standings
	Conf.					Overall
Team	W		L		T	W		L		T
Colorado Agricultural $	6	–	0	–	1	6	–	1	–	1
Colorado College	4	–	1	–	1	5	–	1	–	1
Colorado	3	–	1	–	2	4	–	1	–	2
Utah Agricultural	2	–	1	–	1	4	–	2	–	1
Denver	2	–	4	–	0	2	–	4	–	0
Utah	1	–	2	–	1	1	–	5	–	1
Wyoming	2	–	5	–	1	4	–	5	–	1
Colorado Mines	0	–	6	–	0	0	–	6	–	0
Montana State	0	–	0	–	1	4	–	1	–	1
$ – Conference champion

The 1920 Wyoming Cowboys football team was an American football team that represented the University of Wyoming as a member of the Rocky Mountain Conference (RMC) during the 1920 college football season. In their fifth season under head coach John Corbett, the Cowboys compiled a 4–5–1 record (2–5–1 against conference opponents), finished seventh in the RMC, and were outscored by a total of 106 to 58. Milward Simpson was the team captain.

== Schedule ==
Date	Opponent	Site	Result	Source
October 2	Colorado Agricultural	Laramie, WY (rivalry)	L 0–13	
October 9	at Denver	Denver, CO	W 10–7	
October 16	at Colorado Agricultural	Fort Collins, CO	L 0–42	
October 23	Colorado	Laramie, WY	L 0–7	
October 30	at Colorado Mines	Golden, CO	W 14–7	
November 2	at Nebraska Wesleyan*	Lincoln, NE	W 14–7	
November 6	at Colorado College	Washburn Field; Colorado Springs, CO	L 17–20	
November 13	Denver	Laramie, WY	L 0–3	
November 20	at Utah	Cummings Field; Salt Lake City, UT	T 0–0	
November 25	at Ogden Athletic Club*	Ogden, UT	W 3–0	
*Non-conference game
