= 1920 Hawaii Deans football team =

University of Hawaiʻi football team

1920 Hawaii Deans football
- Conference: Independent
- Record: 6–2
- Head coach: Raymond Elliot (1st season)
- Captain: Norman King
- Home stadium: Cooke Field; Moiliili Field; Alexander Field

1920 Western college football independents records
	Conf.			Overall
Team	W	L	T	W		L		T
Nevada		–		7	–	3	–	1
USC		–		6	–	0	–	0
Arizona		–		6	–	1	–	0
Hawaii		–		6	–	2	–	0
New Mexico A&M		–		5	–	1	–	1
Santa Clara		–		5	–	1	–	0
Gonzaga		–		4	–	3	–	0
Chico State		–		3	–	3	–	0
New Mexico		–		3	–	3	–	0
University Farm		–		3	–	4	–	0
Pacific (CA)		–		1	–	2	–	1
Saint Mary's		–		0	–	3	–	0

The 1920 Hawaii Deans football team represented the University of Hawaiʻi (now known as the University of Hawaiʻi at Mānoa) as an independent during the 1920 college football season. Led by first-year head coach Raymond Elliot, the Deans compiled an overall record of 6–2. Norman King was the team captain.

== Schedule ==
Date	Opponent	Site	Result	Attendance	Source
November 6	Pearl Harbor Navy	Cooke Field; Honolulu, Territory of Hawaii	W 19–0		
November 13	Luke Field	Cooke Field; Honolulu, Territory of Hawaii	W 47–0		
November 18	Oahu College	Cooke Field; Honolulu, Territory of Hawaii	W 21–0		
November 27	Schofield Barracks	Moiliili Field; Honolulu, Territory of Hawaii	W 41–0		
December 4	Pālama	Moiliili Field; Honolulu, Territory of Hawaii	W 7–0	1,800–2,000	
December 11	Outrigger Canoe Club	Moiliili Field; Honolulu, Territory of Hawaii	L 0–3		
December 18	Waikiki	Moiliili Field; Honolulu, Territory of Hawaii	W 23–14		
December 25	Nevada	Alexander Field; Honolulu, Territory of Hawaii	L 0–14	4,000	
