= Lobo (mascot) =

University of New Mexico mascot

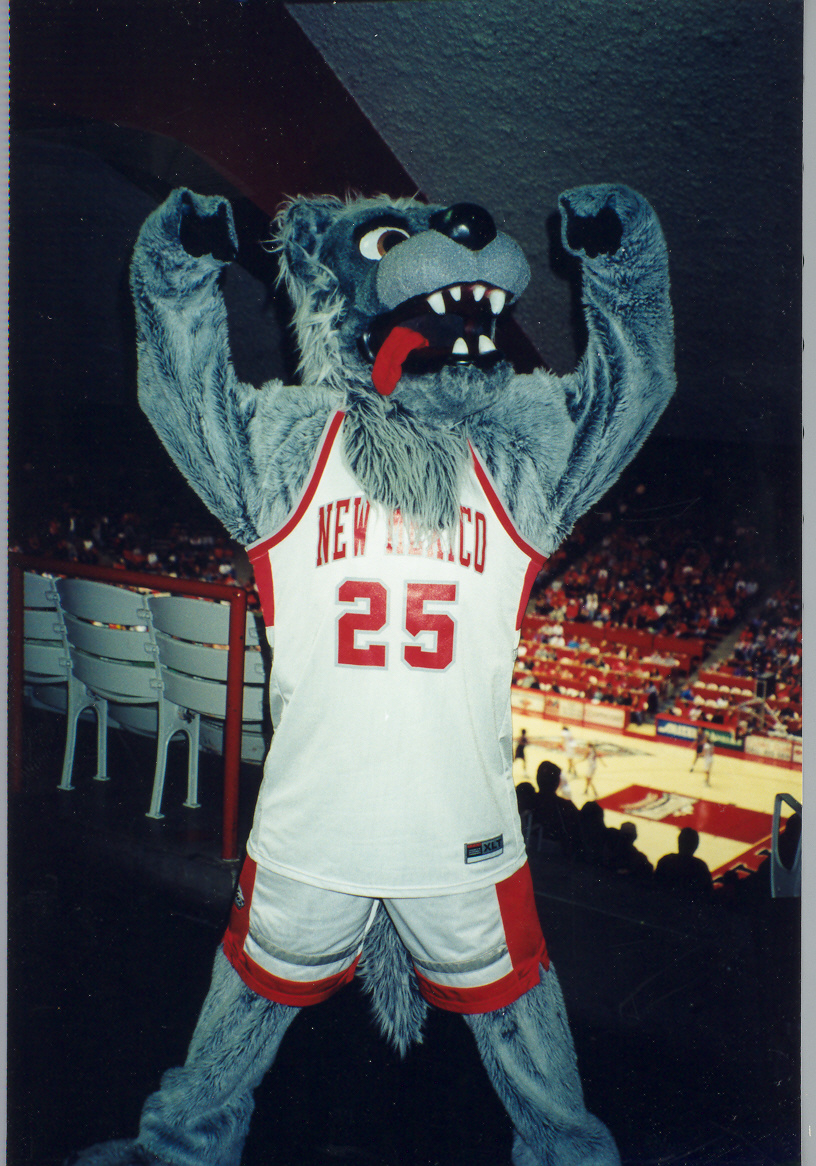
- Lobo Louie at The Pit, early 2000s
- University: University of New Mexico
- Conference: Mountain West
- Description: Male wolf (costume)
- First seen: 1960s
- Related mascot(s): Lobo Lucy

The Lobo is the official mascot of the University of New Mexico (UNM). Lobo Louie and Lobo Lucy are costumed wolf mascots, members of the UNM cheerleading squad, who rouse and entertain fans during Lobo athletic events.

"Lobo" is the Spanish word for "wolf" and was suggested as the school mascot in 1920 by George S. Bryan, editor of the school newspaper and student manager of the football team. "The Lobo is respected for his cunning, feared for his prowess, and is the leader of the pack," wrote Bryan in the October 1, 1920 issue of the newspaper. "All together now; 15 rahs for the LOBOS." The Lobo was adopted as the official mascot of the school, and the campus newspaper later became called The New Mexico Daily Lobo.

For a brief period in the 1920s, a live wolf pup appeared at Lobo football games, but UNM administrators were forced to cease the practice when in the late 1920s a child teased the wolf and was bitten. The school has returned to the idea of a live mascot, but safety has remained a concern. On October 28, 1989, a live wolf was present on the sidelines of a Lobo home football game, and it reportedly nipped a player who rolled out of bounds. In 2004, a live silver wolf that belonged to a UNM professor appeared at the Cherry-Silver spring football scrimmage.

The "Lobo Louie" wolf mascot was created in the 1960s, and "Lobo Lucy" was added in the 1980s. During the tenure of Fran Fraschilla as head basketball coach (1999–2002), a small "Baby Lobo" mascot appeared at men's basketball games, in reality Fraschilla's son. The character was discontinued when Fraschilla was dismissed from the program.

In the 1980s, Lobo fans developed a popular chant, "Everyone's a Lobo, Woof Woof Woof!," together with a hand gesture emulating a wolf. The chant and gesture have since become the signature cheer for Lobo fans.

== Statues ==
Lobo statues
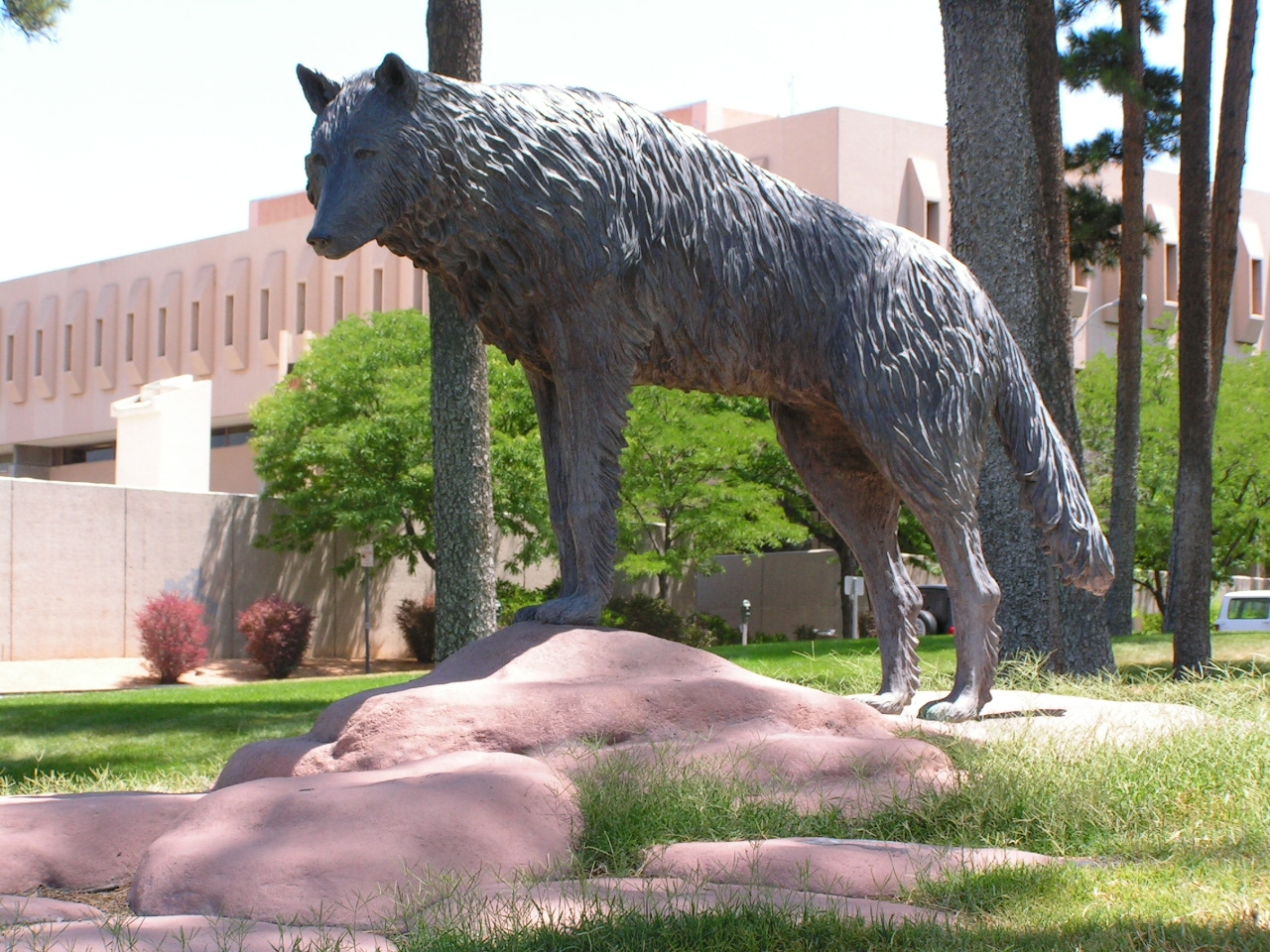

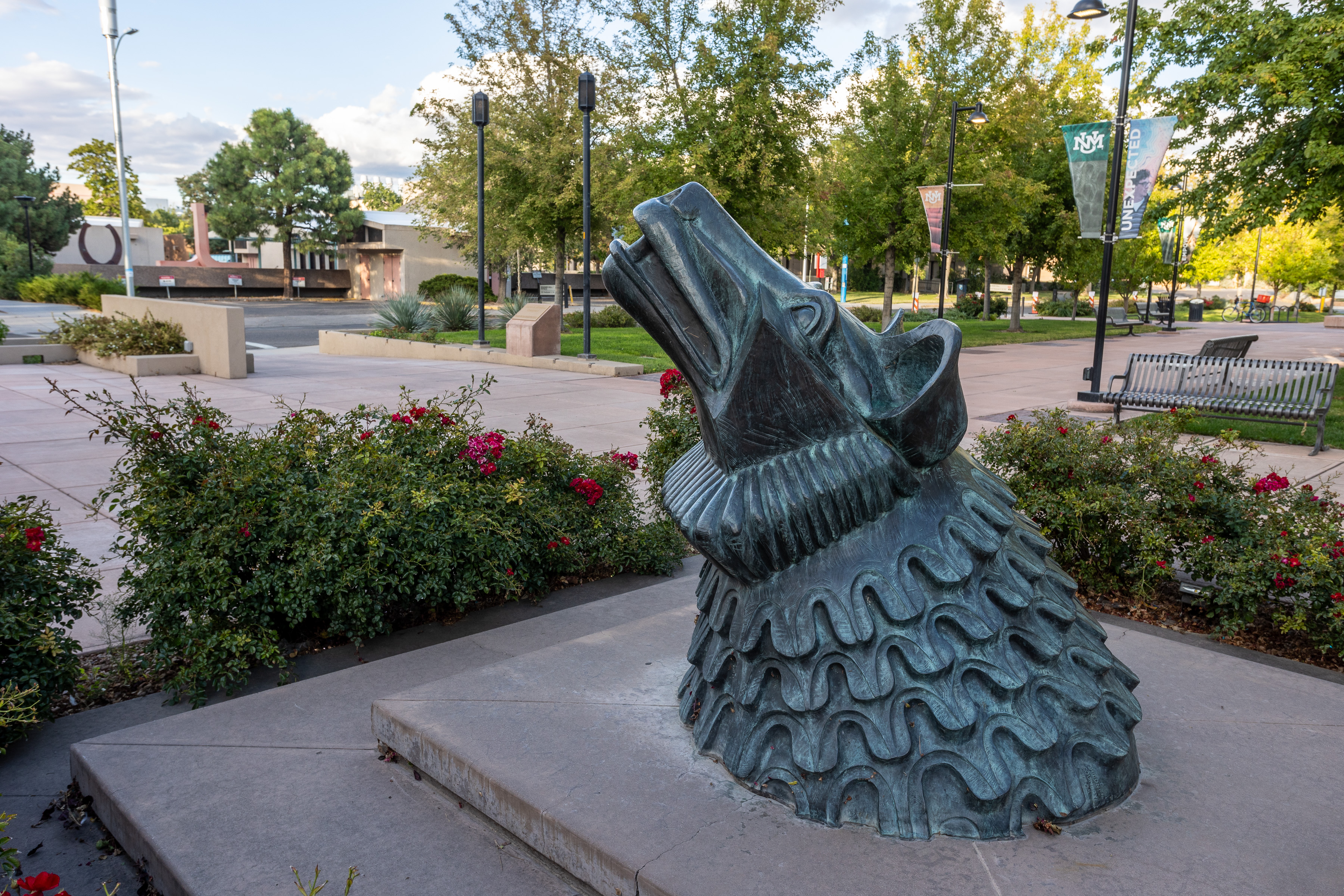
Statue at Hodgin Hall

There are several statues of Lobos on the UNM campus. The most prominent, sculpted by John Tatschl, stands atop a pedestal located near the entrance to campus at Stanford and Central and is dedicated to the UNM students and alumni who gave their lives in World War II. This statue was formerly located in front of Zimmerman Field. Another statue, sculpted by Michelle Middleton, is located in a grove of pine trees overlooking the intersection of Central and University at the southwest corner of campus. A statue of a Lobo head emerging out of the ground is located in front of Hodgin Hall. A number of further Lobo sculptures have been sponsored recently by donors for placement in various other locations, including in front of the President's House, Zimmerman Library, and at The Pit.
