= Hail, New Mexico =

Fight song of the University of New Mexico

"Hail, New Mexico!" is the official fight song of the University of New Mexico. The music was composed in 1931 by UNM music professor Lena Clauve, with lyrics written by UNM English professor George St. Clair. It is performed by the UNM Spirit Marching Band at athletic events and university ceremonies.

== History ==
In 1931, University of New Mexico English professor George St. Clair was in charge of the school's yearbook, The Mirage. He took on a large debt in order to help his students publish it. The University Faculty Club decided to raise the money for St. Clair's debt by putting on a variety show. University President James F. Zimmerman asked the Music Professor and Dean of Women Lena Clauve to compose a tune to close the show. Clauve said that she visited the owner of a local music store and played the notes on an upright piano. After giving the tune to Zimmerman, St. Clair quickly added lyrics. The variety show was a success, St. Clair's debt was erased and the song titled "Hail, New Mexico" became the UNM fight song. It is often played during sporting events, homecoming, bonfire rallies and before UNM Lobos broadcasts.

== Lyrics ==
The song lyrics were written by UNM English professor George St. Clair who would later become Dean Emeritus of the UNM College of Fine Arts.

Hail to thee, New Mexico
Thy loyal sons are we.
Marching down the field we go,
Fighting for thee.
RAH! RAH! RAH!

Now we pledge our faith to thee,
Never shall we fail.
Fighting ever, yielding never.
HAIL! HAIL! HAIL!

== Traditions ==
UNM Head Football Coach Danny Gonzales required players to memorize "Hail, New Mexico!" and would call on individual players during team meetings to stand and sing the song the song.
