= 1920 California Golden Bears football team =

American college football season

1920 California Golden Bears football
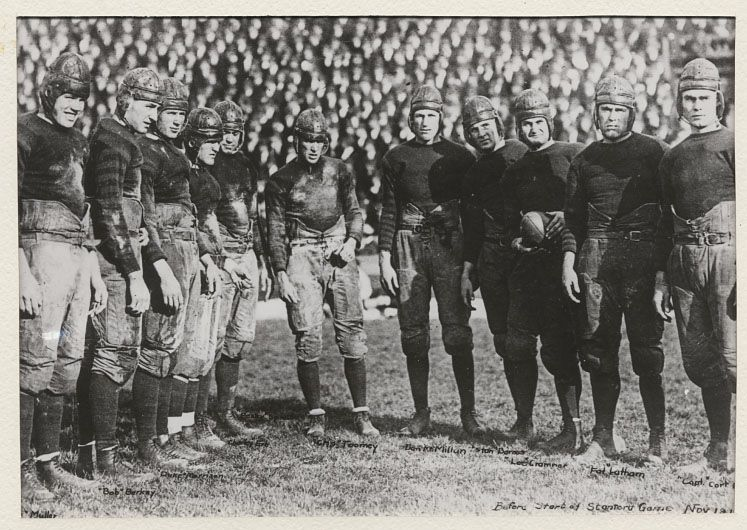

National champion (CFRA, Helms, Houlgate, NCF, Sagarin) Rose Bowl champion PCC champion

Rose Bowl, W 28–0 vs. Ohio State
- Conference: Pacific Coast Conference
- Record: 9–0 (3–0 PCC)
- Head coach: Andy Smith (5th season)
- Offensive scheme: Short-punt
- Captain: Olin C. Majors
- Home stadium: California Field

Uniform
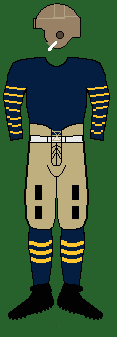

1920 Pacific Coast Conference football standings
	Conf.					Overall
Team	W		L		T	W		L		T
California $	3	–	0	–	0	9	–	0	–	0
Stanford	2	–	1	–	0	4	–	3	–	0
Washington State	1	–	1	–	0	5	–	1	–	0
Oregon	1	–	1	–	1	3	–	2	–	1
Oregon Agricultural	1	–	2	–	1	2	–	2	–	2
Washington	0	–	3	–	0	1	–	5	–	0
$ – Conference champion

The 1920 California Golden Bears football team was an American football team that represented the University of California, Berkeley as a member of the Pacific Coast Conference (PCC) during the 1920 college football season. In their fifth year under head coach Andy Smith, the team compiled a 9–0 record (3–0 against PCC opponents), shut out seven of nine opponents, won the PCC championship, defeated Ohio State in the 1921 Rose Bowl, and outscored its opponents by a total of 510 to 14.

There was no contemporaneous system in 1920 for determining a national champion. However, Cal was retroactively named as the national champion by the College Football Researchers Association, Helms Athletic Foundation, Houlgate System, National Championship Foundation, and Jeff Sagarin.

Olin C. Majors was the team captain. Guard Tim Callahan was a consensus first-team selection on the 1920 All-American football team. Two other players received All-America recognition: end Harold Muller (Newspaper Enterprise Association-1, Walter Camp-3) and tackle Dan McMillan (WC-2).

== Schedule ==
Date	Opponent	Site	Result	Attendance	Source
September 25	Olympic Club*	California Field; Berkeley, CA	W 21–0		
October 2	Mare Island Marines*	California Field; Berkeley, CA	W 88–0		
October 9	Saint Mary's*	California Field; Berkeley, CA	W 127–0		
October 16	Nevada*	California Field; Berkeley, CA	W 79–7		
October 23	Utah*	California Field; Berkeley, CA	W 63–0		
October 30	at Oregon Agricultural	Bell Field; Corvallis, OR	W 17–7	12,000	
November 6	Washington State	California Field; Berkeley, CA	W 49–0		
November 20	Stanford	California Field; Berkeley, CA (Big Game)	W 38–0		
January 1, 1921	vs. Ohio State*	Tournament Park; Pasadena, CA (Rose Bowl)	W 28–0	42,000	
*Non-conference game
