= 1920 Stanford football team =

American college football season

1920 Stanford football
- Conference: Pacific Coast Conference
- Record: 4–3 (2–1 PCC)
- Head coach: Walter D. Powell (1st season)
- Home stadium: Stanford Field

1920 Pacific Coast Conference football standings
	Conf.					Overall
Team	W		L		T	W		L		T
California $	3	–	0	–	0	9	–	0	–	0
Stanford	2	–	1	–	0	4	–	3	–	0
Washington State	1	–	1	–	0	5	–	1	–	0
Oregon	1	–	1	–	1	3	–	2	–	1
Oregon Agricultural	1	–	2	–	1	2	–	2	–	2
Washington	0	–	3	–	0	1	–	5	–	0
$ – Conference champion

The 1920 Stanford football team represented Stanford University as a member of the Pacific Coast Conference (PCC) during the 1920 college football season. Led by Walter D. Powell in his first and only season as head coach, the Stanford compiled an overall record of 4–3 with a mark of 2–1 in conference play, placing second in the PCC. Home games were played on campus at Stanford Field.

On November 6, Stanford defeated Washington, 3–0, in Seattle. It was the final game ever at Denny Field, the predecessor of Husky Stadium, which opened three weeks later.

== Schedule ==
Date	Opponent	Site	Result	Attendance	Source
October 2	Saint Mary's*	Stanford Field; Stanford, CA	W 41–0		
October 9	Olympic Club*	Stanford Field; Stanford, CA	L 7–10		
October 16	at USC*	Bovard Field; Los Angeles, CA (rivalry)	L 0–10	8,000	
October 23	at Santa Clara*	Santa Clara Stadium; Santa Clara, CA	W 21–7	10,000	
October 30	Oregon	Stanford Field; Stanford, CA	W 10–0		
November 6	at Washington	Denny Field; Seattle, WA	W 3–0	9,000	
November 20	California	California Field; Berkeley, CA (Big Game)	L 0–38		
*Non-conference game
