= Denny Field (Washington) =

Former American football venue, University of Washington, Seattle

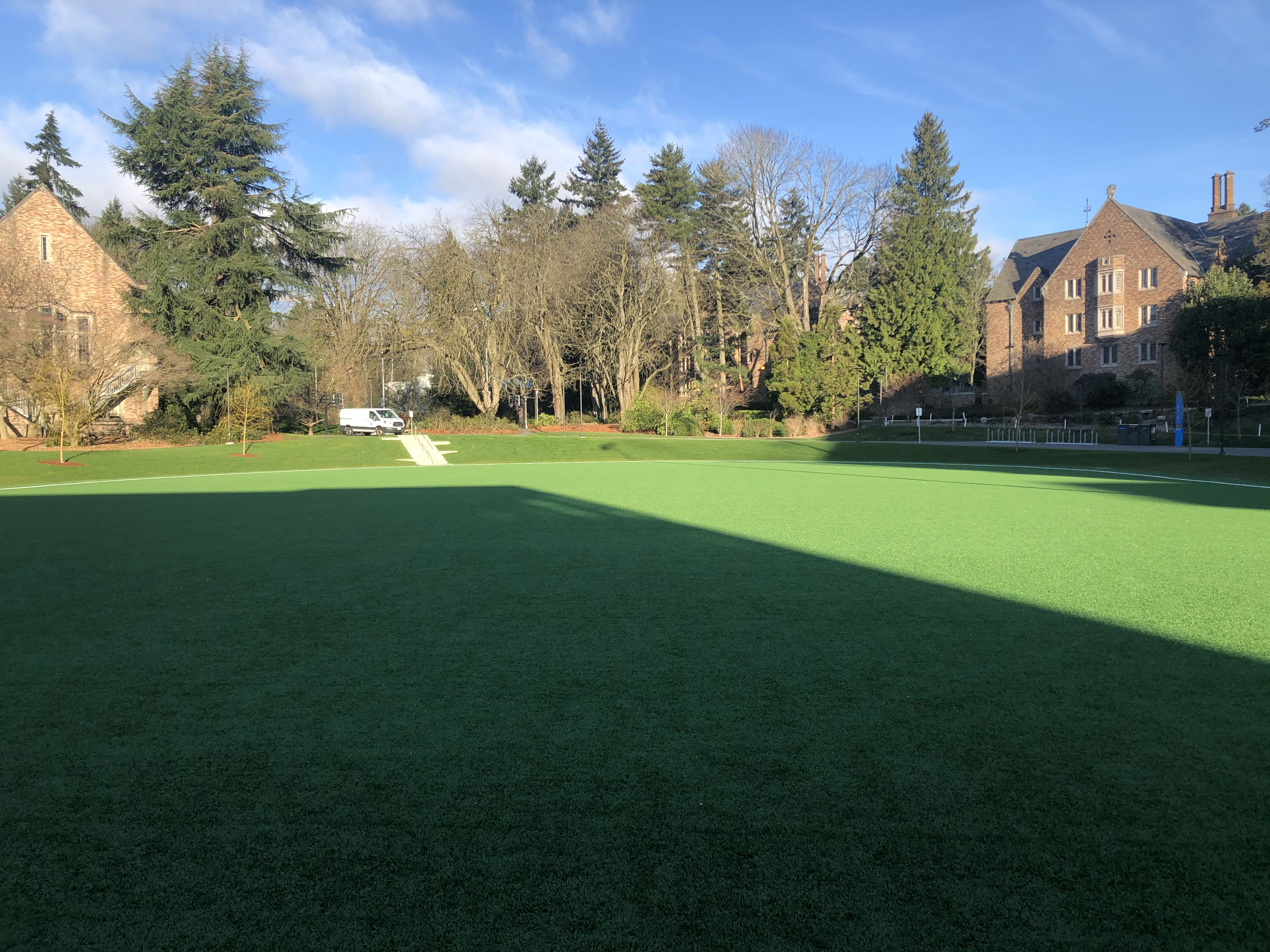
- Denny Field in March 2021

- Location in Washington Location in the United States
- Interactive map of Denny Field
- Former names: University Field
- Address: NE 45th St. and 20th Ave. NE
- Location: University of Washington; Seattle, Washington, U.S.
- Coordinates: 47.66°N 122.306°W
- Owner: University of Washington
- Operator: University of Washington
- Surface: Natural turf

Construction
- Opened: 1895; 131 years ago
- Closed: November 6, 1920; 105 years ago

Tenant
- Washington Sun Dodgers (1895–1920)

Denny Field is located on the campus of the University of Washington in Seattle. It was the home grounds for the university's football team for a quarter-century, from 1895 until 1920. Washington compiled an overall home record of 87 wins, 15 losses, and 13 ties (.813) on the field including an NCAA record 59–0–4 winning streak from 1907 to 1917.

Prior to the 1901 season, university students proposed playing games on campus grounds rather than at the Athletic Park on Capitol Hill.

On Saturday, November 6, 1920, the final game at Denny Field was played, a 3–0 loss to Stanford; the only scoring was a drop-kicked field goal in the second quarter. Three weeks later, the UW Sun Dodgers hosted Dartmouth of New Hampshire in the inaugural game of the venue later known as Husky Stadium; the visitors won 28–7 on November 27.

Denny Field is near the northern edge of campus at an approximate elevation of 190 feet (58 m) above sea level. It is located south of the intersection of NE 45th Street and 20th Avenue NE, by Hutchinson Hall and Hansee Hall.
