= 1920 Lehigh Brown and White football team =

American college football season

1920 Lehigh Brown and White football
- Conference: Independent
- Record: 5–2–2
- Head coach: Tom Keady (9th season)
- Home stadium: Taylor Stadium

1920 Eastern college football independents records
	Conf.			Overall
Team	W	L	T	W		L		T
Boston College		–		8	–	0	–	0
Harvard		–		8	–	0	–	1
Princeton		–		6	–	0	–	1
Penn State		–		7	–	0	–	2
Pittsburgh		–		6	–	0	–	2
Army		–		7	–	2	–	0
Dartmouth		–		7	–	2	–	0
Cornell		–		6	–	2	–	0
Syracuse		–		6	–	2	–	1
Geneva		–		5	–	2	–	1
New Hampshire		–		5	–	2	–	1
Brown		–		6	–	3	–	0
Bucknell		–		6	–	3	–	0
Washington & Jefferson		–		6	–	3	–	1
Penn		–		6	–	4	–	0
Carnegie Tech		–		5	–	3	–	0
Lafayette		–		5	–	3	–	0
Holy Cross		–		5	–	3	–	0
Williams		–		5	–	3	–	0
Yale		–		5	–	3	–	0
Fordham		–		4	–	3	–	0
Franklin & Marshall		–		3	–	2	–	2
Boston University		–		4	–	3	–	1
Columbia		–		4	–	4	–	0
Duquesne		–		3	–	3	–	1
Vermont		–		3	–	5	–	0
NYU		–		2	–	5	–	1
Rhode Island State		–		0	–	4	–	4
Tufts		–		2	–	6	–	0
Rutgers		–		2	–	7	–	0
Buffalo		–		1	–	4	–	0
Colgate		–		1	–	5	–	2
Villanova		–		1	–	5	–	1
Drexel		–		0	–	6	–	0

The 1920 Lehigh Brown and White football team was an American football team that represented Lehigh University as an independent during the 1920 college football season. In its ninth season under head coach Tom Keady, the team compiled a 5–2–2 record and outscored opponents by a total of 172 to 54. Lehigh played home games at Taylor Stadium in Bethlehem, Pennsylvania.

== Schedule ==
Date	Time	Opponent	Site	Result	Attendance	Source
September 25		Lebanon Valley	Taylor Stadium; Bethlehem, PA	W 28–0		
October 2		at West Virginia	Athletic Field; Morgantown, WV	T 7–7		
October 9		Rutgers	Taylor Stadium; Bethlehem, PA	W 9–0	10,000	
October 16		Rochester	Taylor Stadium; Bethlehem, PA	W 41–0		
October 23		at Washington & Jefferson	Washington, PA	L 0–14		
October 30	3:00 p.m.	Carnegie Tech	Taylor Stadium; Bethlehem, PA	W 17–6		
November 6	2:45 p.m.	Muhlenberg	Taylor Stadium; Bethlehem, PA	W 56–0		
November 13		Penn State	Taylor Stadium; Bethlehem, PA	T 7–7	9,000	
November 20		at Lafayette	March Field; Easton, PA (rivalry)	L 7–27	14,000	
All times are in Eastern time
