= 1920 Connecticut Aggies football team =

American college football season

1920 Connecticut Aggies football
- Conference: Athletic League of New England State Colleges
- Record: 1–6–1 (0–2–1 New England)
- Head coach: Ross Swartz (1st season)
- Home stadium: Gardner Dow Athletic Fields

The 1920 Connecticut Aggies football team represented Connecticut Agricultural College, now the University of Connecticut, in the 1920 college football season. The Aggies were led by first-year head coach Ross Swartz, and completed the season with a record of 1–6–1.

== Schedule ==
| Date | Opponent | Site | Result | Source |
|---|---|---|---|---|
| September 25 | at Trinity (CT)* | Trinity Field; Hartford, CT | L 0–14 | |
| October 2 | at Massachusetts | Alumni Field; Amherst, MA (rivalry) | L 0–28 | |
| October 9 | at Worcester Tech* | Worcester, MA | L 6–9 | |
| October 16 | Lowell Textile* | Gardner Dow Athletic Fields; Storrs, CT | L 0–7 | |
| October 23 | New Hampshire | Gardner Dow Athletic Fields; Storrs, CT | L 0–40 | |
| October 30 | at Boston University* | Braves Field; Boston, MA | L 0–28 | |
| November 13 | St. Stephen's (NY)* | Gardner Dow Athletic Fields; Storrs, CT | W 63–0 | |
| November 20 | Rhode Island State | Gardner Dow Athletic Fields; Storrs, CT (rivalry) | T 0–0 | |
*Non-conference game
