= Tom Keady =

American athlete and coach (1882–1964)

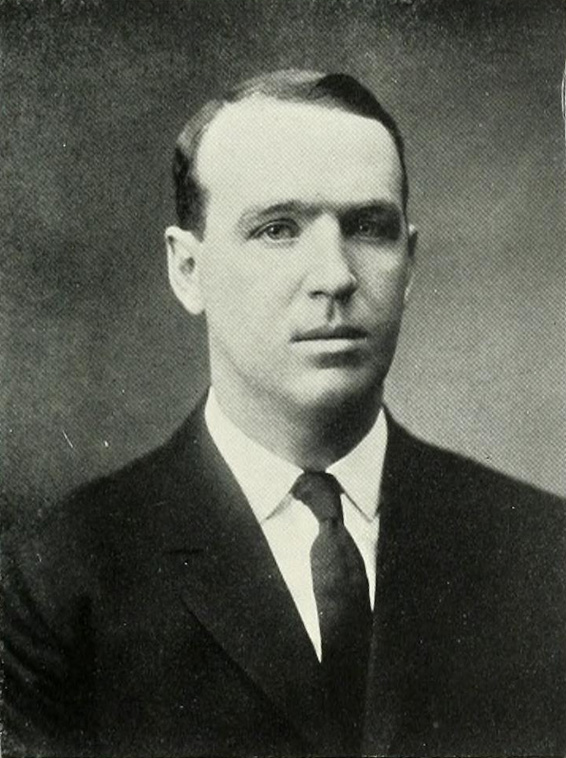
- Keady pictured in The Epitome 1916, Lehigh yearbook

Biographical details
- Born: August 18, 1882; Wakefield, Massachusetts, U.S.
- Died: January 12, 1964 (aged 81); Concord, New Hampshire, U.S.

Playing career

Football
- 1904: Dartmouth

Baseball
- 1902–1905: Dartmouth
- 1907–1908: Haverhill Hustlers
- 1908: Lynn Shoemakers
- 1908–1909: Worcester Busters

Coaching career (HC unless noted)

Football
- 1905–1911: Dartmouth (assistant)
- 1912–1920: Lehigh
- 1921–1924: Vermont
- 1925–1930: Quantico Marines
- 1931–1933: Western Reserve

Basketball
- 1910–1911: Dartmouth
- 1912–1913: Lehigh
- 1921–1922: Vermont
- 1923–1925: Vermont

Baseball
- 1908–1911: Dartmouth
- 1912–1922: Lehigh
- 1923: Fordham (assistant)
- 1924: Vermont

Head coaching record
- Overall: 87–48–6 (football); 73–23 (basketball); 174–131–5 (baseball)

John Thomas Keady (August 18, 1882 – February 12, 1964) was an American football, basketball, and baseball player and coach. He served as the head football coach at Lehigh University from 1912 to 1920, at the University of Vermont from 1921 to 1924, at Marine Corps Base Quantico from 1925 to 1930, and at Western Reserve University from 1931 to 1933, compiling a career college football record of 87–48–6. Keady was also the head basketball coach and the head baseball coach at Dartmouth College, Lehigh, Vermont, and Quantico.

== Early life and playing career ==
Keady was born on August 18, 1882, in Wakefield, Massachusetts. He attended Dartmouth College, where he lettered in football and baseball.

== Coaching career ==
Keady was the 13th head football coach at Lehigh University) in Bethlehem, Pennsylvania, serving for nine seasons, from 1912 to 1920, and compiling a record at Lehigh was 56–23–3. This ranks him second among Lehigh head coaches in winning percentage at .701, behind only Pete Lembo (44–14, .759). Keady was the head football coach at Western Reserve University from 1931 to 1933, compiling a record of 14–9–2 in three seasons.

== Death ==
Keady died at the age of 82 on February 12, 1964, in Concord, New Hampshire.

== Head coaching record ==
=== Football ===
Year	Team	Overall	Conference	Standing	Bowl/playoffs
Lehigh Brown and White (Independent) (1912–1920)
1912	Lehigh	9–2			
1913	Lehigh	5–3			
1914	Lehigh	8–1			
1915	Lehigh	6–4			
1916	Lehigh	6–2–1			
1917	Lehigh	7–2			
1918	Lehigh	4–3			
1919	Lehigh	6–3			
1920	Lehigh	5–2–2			
Lehigh:		56–22–3			
Vermont Green and Gold (Independent) (1921–1924)
1921	Vermont	3–4			
1922	Vermont	6–3			
1923	Vermont	6–3–1			
1924	Vermont	2–7			
Vermont:		17–17–1			
Quantico Marines Devil Dogs (Independent) (1925–1930)
1925	Quantico Marines	6–3–1			
1926	Quantico Marines	10–3			
1927	Quantico Marines	10–0			
1928	Quantico Marines	8–1–1			
1929	Quantico Marines	5–3			
1930	Quantico Marines	6–2–1			
Quantico Marines:		45–12–3			
Western Reserve Red Cats (Ohio Athletic Conference) (1931)
1931	Western Reserve	3–5–1	3–0	2nd	
Western Reserve Red Cats (Independent) (1932)
1932	Western Reserve	7–1			
Western Reserve Red Cats (Big Four Conference) (1933)
1933	Western Reserve	4–3–1	1–1–1	2nd	
Western Reserve:		14–9–2	4–1–1		
Total:		132–60–9			

=== Basketball ===
Record table
Season	Team	Overall	Conference	Standing	Postseason
Dartmouth Big Green () (1910–1911)
1910–11	Dartmouth	5–6			
Dartmouth:		5–6			
Lehigh Brown and White () (1912–1913)
1912–13	Lehigh	12–2			
Lehigh:		12–2			
Vermont Catamounts () (1921–1925)
1921–22	Vermont	15–4			
1922–23	Vermont	12–6			
1923–24	Vermont	15–2			
1924–25	Vermont	14–3			
Vermont:		56–15			
Total:		73–23			
