= 1920 Massachusetts Aggies football team =

American college football season

1920 Massachusetts Aggies football
- Conference: Athletic League of New England State Colleges
- Record: 5–2–1 ( ALNESC)
- Head coach: Harold Gore (2nd season)
- Home stadium: Alumni Field

The 1920 Massachusetts Aggies football team represented Massachusetts Agricultural College in the 1920 college football season. The team was coached by Harold Gore and played its home games at Alumni Field in Amherst, Massachusetts. Massachusetts finished the season with a record of 5–2–1.

== Schedule ==
Date	Opponent	Site	Result	Source
October 2	Connecticut	Alumni Field; Amherst, MA (rivalry)	W 28–0	
October 9	Bates	Alumni Field; Amherst, MA	W 21–7	
October 16	at Worcester Tech	Alumni Field; Worcester, MA	W 21–6	
October 23	at Vermont	Centennial Field; Burlington, VT	W 21–7	
October 30	New Hampshire	Alumni Field; Amherst, MA (rivalry)	L 0–9	
November 6	Rhode Island State	Alumni Field; Amherst, MA	T 7–7	
November 13	at Springfield YMCA	Pratt Field; Springfield, MA	L 7–28	
November 20	Tufts	Alumni Field; Amherst, MA	W 21–0	
