= 1920 Stout Institute football team =

American college football season

1920 Stout Institute football
- Conference: Wisconsin Normal Athletic Conference
- Record: 2–2 (0–0 WNAC)
- Head coach: George F. Miller (2nd season)

1920 Wisconsin Normal Athletic Conference football standings
	Conf.					Overall
Team	W		L		T	W		L		T
Oshkosh Normal $	4	–	0	–	1	6	–	1	–	1
Eau Claire Normal	2	–	0	–	0	4	–	0	–	0
River Falls Normal	2	–	1	–	1	3	–	1	–	3
La Crosse Normal	3	–	2	–	0	4	–	2	–	1
Milwaukee Normal	2	–	2	–	0	3	–	4	–	1
Stevens Point Normal	1	–	1	–	1	3	–	2	–	1
Whitewater Normal	1	–	3	–	0	2	–	4	–	0
Platteville Normal	0	–	3	–	1	3	–	4	–	2
Superior Normal	0	–	3	–	0	1	–	3	–	0
Stout Institute	0	–	0	–	0	2	–	2	–	0
$ – Conference champion

The 1920 Stout Institute football team represented Stout Institute—now known as the University of Wisconsin–Stout—as a member of the Wisconsin Normal Athletic Conference during the 1920 college football season. Led by second-year head coach George F. Miller, Stout Institute compiled an overall record of 2–2 and did not play any games against conference opponents. The team played home games in Menomonie, Wisconsin.

== Schedule ==
Date	Opponent	Site	Result	Source
October 2	Hamline*	Menomonie, WI	L 3–20	
October 9	Macalester*	Menomonie, WI	W 13–0	
October 16	at Carleton*	Northfield, MN	L 7–9	
October 22	Saint Mary's (MN)*	Menomonie, WI	W 16–0	
*Non-conference game
