= 1920 Washington & Jefferson Presidents football team =

American college football season

1920 Washington & Jefferson Presidents football
- Conference: Independent
- Record: 6–3–1
- Head coach: David C. Morrow (6th season)
- Captain: Garbisch

1920 Eastern college football independents records
	Conf.			Overall
Team	W	L	T	W		L		T
Boston College		–		8	–	0	–	0
Harvard		–		8	–	0	–	1
Princeton		–		6	–	0	–	1
Penn State		–		7	–	0	–	2
Pittsburgh		–		6	–	0	–	2
Army		–		7	–	2	–	0
Dartmouth		–		7	–	2	–	0
Cornell		–		6	–	2	–	0
Syracuse		–		6	–	2	–	1
Geneva		–		5	–	2	–	1
New Hampshire		–		5	–	2	–	1
Brown		–		6	–	3	–	0
Bucknell		–		6	–	3	–	0
Washington & Jefferson		–		6	–	3	–	1
Penn		–		6	–	4	–	0
Carnegie Tech		–		5	–	3	–	0
Lafayette		–		5	–	3	–	0
Holy Cross		–		5	–	3	–	0
Williams		–		5	–	3	–	0
Yale		–		5	–	3	–	0
Fordham		–		4	–	3	–	0
Franklin & Marshall		–		3	–	2	–	2
Boston University		–		4	–	3	–	1
Columbia		–		4	–	4	–	0
Duquesne		–		3	–	3	–	1
Vermont		–		3	–	5	–	0
NYU		–		2	–	5	–	1
Rhode Island State		–		0	–	4	–	4
Tufts		–		2	–	6	–	0
Rutgers		–		2	–	7	–	0
Buffalo		–		1	–	4	–	0
Colgate		–		1	–	5	–	2
Villanova		–		1	–	5	–	1
Drexel		–		0	–	6	–	0

The 1920 Washington & Jefferson Presidents football team was an American football team that represented Washington & Jefferson College as an independent during the 1920 college football season. Led by sixth-year head coach David C. Morrow, the team compiled a record of 6–3–1.

== Schedule ==
Date	Opponent	Site	Result	Attendance	Source
September 25	Bethany (WV)	Washington, PA	W 28–0		
October 2	at West Virginia Wesleyan	Wheeling, WV	T 7–7		
October 9	Kalamazoo	Washington, PA	W 67–0		
October 16	Geneva	Washington, PA	W 14–0		
October 23	Lehigh	Washington, PA	W 14–0		
October 30	Westminster (PA)	Washington, PA	W 49–0		
November 6	at Syracuse	Archbold Stadium; Syracuse, NY	L 0–14		
November 13	at Pittsburgh	Forbes Field; Pittsburgh, PA	L 0–7	31,500	
November 20	at Carnegie Tech	Pittsburgh, PA	L 0–6		
November 25	West Virginia	Washington, PA	W 28–0		
