= 1920 Maine Black Bears football team =

American college football season

1920 Maine Black Bears football
- Conference: Maine Intercollegiate Athletic Association
- Record: 3–3–3 (2–0–1 MIAA)
- Head coach: James A. Baldwin (2nd season)
- Captain: Raymond Smith
- Home stadium: Alumni Field

The 1920 Maine Black Bears football team was an American football team that represented the University of Maine during the 1920 college football season. In its second season under head coach James A. Baldwin, the team compiled a 3–3–3 record. Raymond Smith was the team captain.

== Schedule ==
Date	Opponent	Site	Result	Attendance	Source
September 18	Fort McKinley*	Alumni Field; Orono, ME	W 58–0		
September 25	Boston University*	Alumni Field; Orono, ME	T 0–0		
October 2	at Harvard*	Harvard Stadium; Boston, MA	L 0–41	10,000	
October 9	at Brown*	Andrews Field; Providence, RI	L 7–32		
October 16	Rhode Island State*	Alumni Field; Orono, ME	T 7–7		
October 23	Bates	Alumni Field; Orono, ME	W 14–8		
October 30	Colby	Alumni Field; Orono, ME	W 22–0		
November 6	at Bowdoin	Whittier Field; Brunswick, ME	T 7–7		
*Non-conference game
