= 1920 New Hampshire football team =

American college football season

1920 New Hampshire football
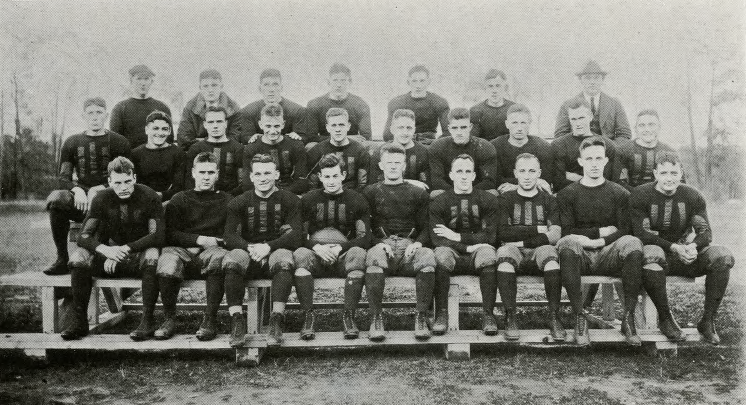
- Conference: Independent
- Record: 5–2–1
- Head coach: Butch Cowell (5th season)
- Captain: Harold I. Leavitt
- Home stadium: College Oval (Note: College Oval (also known as College Field) was New Hampshire's home field through the 1920 season; Memorial Field, dedicated in 1921, was built in the same location.)

1920 Eastern college football independents records
	Conf.			Overall
Team	W	L	T	W		L		T
Boston College		–		8	–	0	–	0
Harvard		–		8	–	0	–	1
Princeton		–		6	–	0	–	1
Penn State		–		7	–	0	–	2
Pittsburgh		–		6	–	0	–	2
Army		–		7	–	2	–	0
Dartmouth		–		7	–	2	–	0
Cornell		–		6	–	2	–	0
Syracuse		–		6	–	2	–	1
Geneva		–		5	–	2	–	1
New Hampshire		–		5	–	2	–	1
Brown		–		6	–	3	–	0
Bucknell		–		6	–	3	–	0
Washington & Jefferson		–		6	–	3	–	1
Penn		–		6	–	4	–	0
Carnegie Tech		–		5	–	3	–	0
Lafayette		–		5	–	3	–	0
Holy Cross		–		5	–	3	–	0
Williams		–		5	–	3	–	0
Yale		–		5	–	3	–	0
Fordham		–		4	–	3	–	0
Franklin & Marshall		–		3	–	2	–	2
Boston University		–		4	–	3	–	1
Columbia		–		4	–	4	–	0
Duquesne		–		3	–	3	–	1
Vermont		–		3	–	5	–	0
NYU		–		2	–	5	–	1
Rhode Island State		–		0	–	4	–	4
Tufts		–		2	–	6	–	0
Rutgers		–		2	–	7	–	0
Buffalo		–		1	–	4	–	0
Colgate		–		1	–	5	–	2
Villanova		–		1	–	5	–	1
Drexel		–		0	–	6	–	0

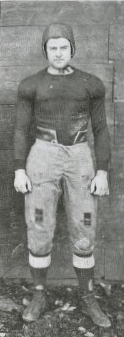
Team captain Harold I. Leavitt c. 1919, in the annual college yearbook

The 1920 New Hampshire football team (Note: The school did not adopt the Wildcats nickname until February 1926; before then, they were generally referred to as "the blue and white".) was an American football team that represented New Hampshire College of Agriculture and the Mechanic Arts (Note: The school was often referred to as New Hampshire College or New Hampshire State College in newspapers of the era.) during the 1920 college football season—the school became the University of New Hampshire in 1923. In its fifth season under head coach William "Butch" Cowell, (Note: This was Cowell's 6th year and 5th season as head coach, as the school did not field a varsity team in 1918 due to World War I.) the team compiled a 5–2–1 record, while outscoring their opponents by a total of 124 to 53.

== Schedule ==
Date	Opponent	Site	Result	Attendance	Source
October 2	Bates	College Oval; Durham, NH	W 14–0		
October 9	at Boston University	Braves Field; Boston, MA	W 7–0	2,000	
October 16	Vermont	College Oval; Durham, NH	L 0–7		
October 23	at Connecticut	Gardner Dow Field; Storrs, CT	W 40–0		
October 30	at Massachusetts	Alumni Field; Amherst, MA (rivalry)	W 9–0		
November 6	Colby^{†}	College Oval; Durham, NH	T 7–7		
November 13	at Maine	Alumni Field; Orono, ME (rivalry)	W 47–7		
November 20	at Holy Cross	Fitton Field; Worcester, MA	L 0–32	5,000	
^{†}Homecoming; Source:

The 1920 game was the first meeting between the New Hampshire and Boston University football programs.

Team captain Harold I. Leavitt would go on to become superintendent of properties at the University of New Hampshire from 1947 until his retirement in 1966. He was an inaugural member of the UNH Wildcats Hall of Fame in 1982.
