= 1920 Rutgers Queensmen football team =

American college football season

1920 Rutgers Queensmen football
- Conference: Independent
- Record: 2–7
- Head coach: George Sanford (8th season)
- Home stadium: Neilson Field

1920 Eastern college football independents records
	Conf.			Overall
Team	W	L	T	W		L		T
Boston College		–		8	–	0	–	0
Harvard		–		8	–	0	–	1
Princeton		–		6	–	0	–	1
Penn State		–		7	–	0	–	2
Pittsburgh		–		6	–	0	–	2
Army		–		7	–	2	–	0
Dartmouth		–		7	–	2	–	0
Cornell		–		6	–	2	–	0
Syracuse		–		6	–	2	–	1
Geneva		–		5	–	2	–	1
New Hampshire		–		5	–	2	–	1
Brown		–		6	–	3	–	0
Bucknell		–		6	–	3	–	0
Washington & Jefferson		–		6	–	3	–	1
Penn		–		6	–	4	–	0
Carnegie Tech		–		5	–	3	–	0
Lafayette		–		5	–	3	–	0
Holy Cross		–		5	–	3	–	0
Williams		–		5	–	3	–	0
Yale		–		5	–	3	–	0
Fordham		–		4	–	3	–	0
Franklin & Marshall		–		3	–	2	–	2
Boston University		–		4	–	3	–	1
Columbia		–		4	–	4	–	0
Duquesne		–		3	–	3	–	1
Vermont		–		3	–	5	–	0
NYU		–		2	–	5	–	1
Rhode Island State		–		0	–	4	–	4
Tufts		–		2	–	6	–	0
Rutgers		–		2	–	7	–	0
Buffalo		–		1	–	4	–	0
Colgate		–		1	–	5	–	2
Villanova		–		1	–	5	–	1
Drexel		–		0	–	6	–	0

The 1920 Rutgers Queensmen football team represented Rutgers University as an independent during the 1920 college football season. In their eighth season under head coach George Sanford, the Queensmen compiled a 2–7 record and were outscored by their opponents, 132 to 32. The team's two victories were against Maryland and Virginia Tech. The losses included games against Nebraska and West Virginia. Sanford was inducted into the College Football Hall of Fame in 1971.

== Schedule ==
Date	Opponent	Site	Result	Attendance	Source
September 25	Ursinus	Neilson Field; New Brunswick, NJ	L 7–14		
October 2	Maryland	Neilson Field; New Brunswick, NJ	W 6–0		
October 9	at Lehigh	Bethlehem, PA	L 0–9	10,000	
October 16	VPI	Neilson Field; New Brunswick, NJ	W 19–6		
October 23	Virginia	Neilson Field; New Brunswick, NJ	L 0–7		
October 30	at Cornell	Schoellkopf Field; Ithaca, NY	L 0–24		
November 2	vs. Nebraska	Polo Grounds; New York, NY	L 0–28	15,000	
November 13	at West Virginia	Athletic Field; Morgantown, WV	L 0–17	5,000	
November 25	at Detroit	Detroit, MI	L 0–27		
