= 1920 Penn State Nittany Lions football team =

American college football season

1920 Penn State Nittany Lions football
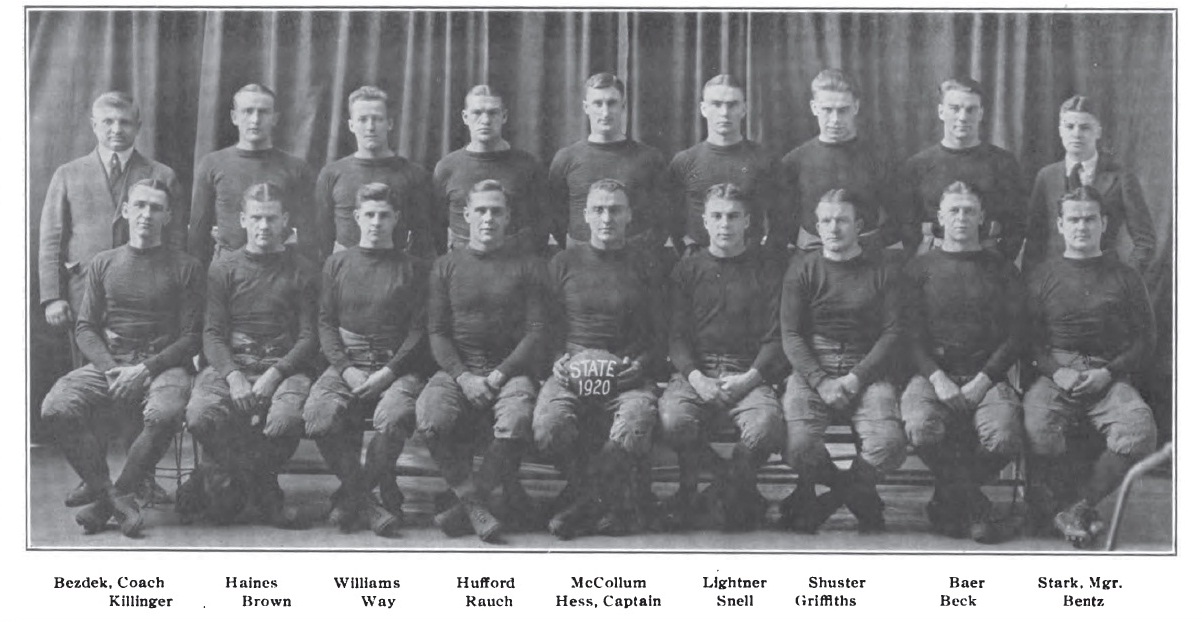
- Conference: Independent
- Record: 7–0–2
- Head coach: Hugo Bezdek (3rd season)
- Captain: Bill Hess
- Home stadium: New Beaver Field

1920 Eastern college football independents records
	Conf.			Overall
Team	W	L	T	W		L		T
Boston College		–		8	–	0	–	0
Harvard		–		8	–	0	–	1
Princeton		–		6	–	0	–	1
Penn State		–		7	–	0	–	2
Pittsburgh		–		6	–	0	–	2
Army		–		7	–	2	–	0
Dartmouth		–		7	–	2	–	0
Cornell		–		6	–	2	–	0
Syracuse		–		6	–	2	–	1
Geneva		–		5	–	2	–	1
New Hampshire		–		5	–	2	–	1
Brown		–		6	–	3	–	0
Bucknell		–		6	–	3	–	0
Washington & Jefferson		–		6	–	3	–	1
Penn		–		6	–	4	–	0
Carnegie Tech		–		5	–	3	–	0
Lafayette		–		5	–	3	–	0
Holy Cross		–		5	–	3	–	0
Williams		–		5	–	3	–	0
Yale		–		5	–	3	–	0
Fordham		–		4	–	3	–	0
Franklin & Marshall		–		3	–	2	–	2
Boston University		–		4	–	3	–	1
Columbia		–		4	–	4	–	0
Duquesne		–		3	–	3	–	1
Vermont		–		3	–	5	–	0
NYU		–		2	–	5	–	1
Rhode Island State		–		0	–	4	–	4
Tufts		–		2	–	6	–	0
Rutgers		–		2	–	7	–	0
Buffalo		–		1	–	4	–	0
Colgate		–		1	–	5	–	2
Villanova		–		1	–	5	–	1
Drexel		–		0	–	6	–	0

The 1920 Penn State Nittany Lions football team represented the Pennsylvania State College as an independent during the 1920 college football season. Led by third-year head coach Hugo Bezdek, the team played its home games in New Beaver Field in State College, Pennsylvania.

The Lions were undefeated, but were tied in their final two games.

== Schedule ==
Date	Opponent	Site	Result	Attendance	Source
September 25	Muhlenberg	New Beaver Field; State College, PA	W 27–7	2,500	
October 2	Gettysburg	New Beaver Field; State College, PA	W 13–0	2,500	
October 9	Dartmouth^{†}	New Beaver Field; State College, PA	W 14–7	6,000	
October 16	NC State	New Beaver Field; State College, PA	W 41–0	3,500	
October 23	Lebanon Valley	New Beaver Field; State College, PA	W 109–7	2,500	
October 30	at Penn	Franklin Field; Philadelphia, PA	W 28–7	30,000	
November 6	Nebraska	New Beaver Field; State College, PA	W 20–0	9,000	
November 13	at Lehigh	Taylor Stadium; Bethlehem, PA	T 7–7	9,000	
November 25	at Pittsburgh	Forbes Field; Pittsburgh, PA (rivalry)	T 0–0	32,500	
^{†}Homecoming
