= Tim Callahan (American football) =

American football player and coach (1895–1976)

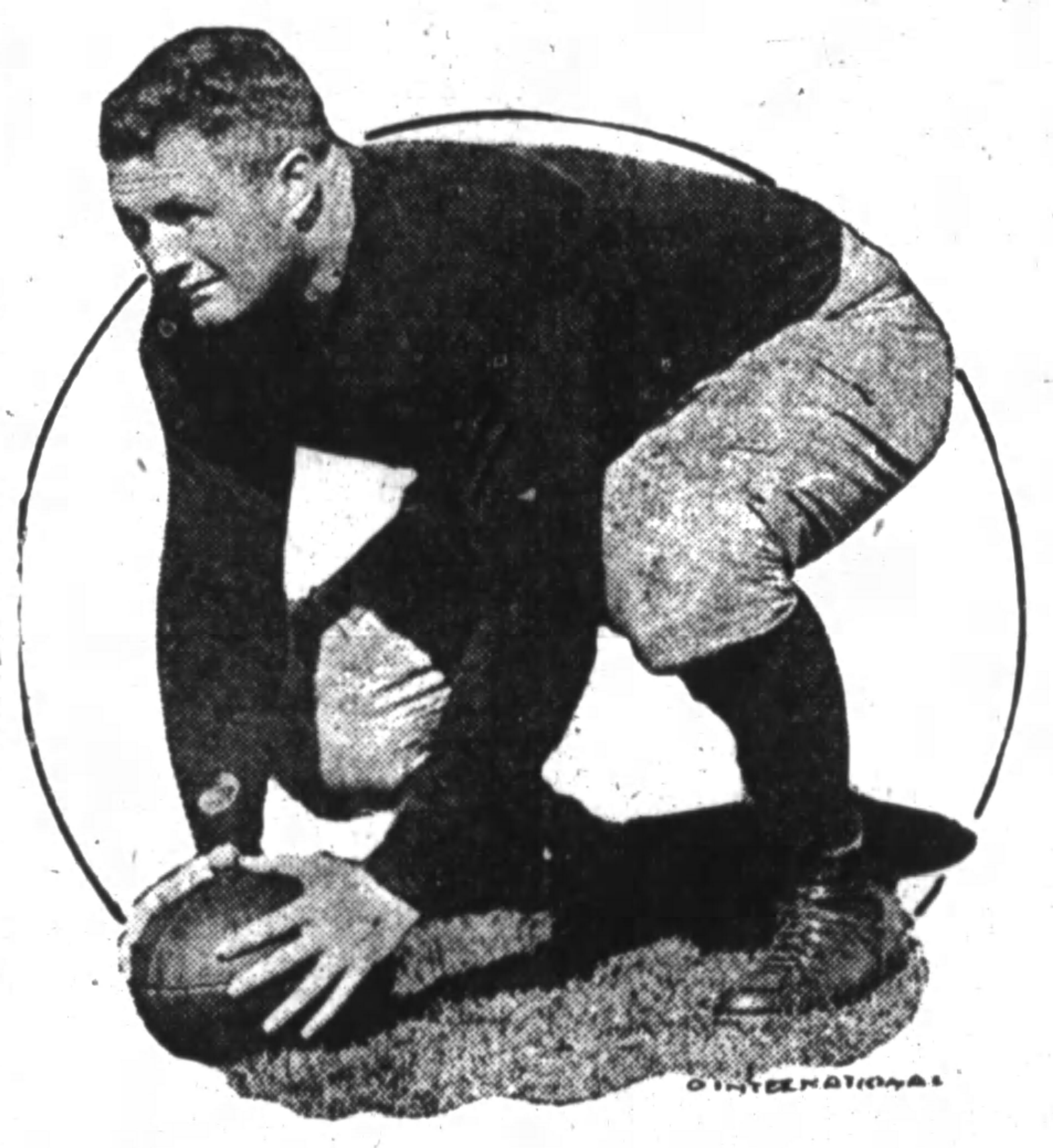

Biographical details
- Born: March 29, 1895; Lawrence, Massachusetts, U.S.
- Died: May 14, 1976 (aged 81)

Playing career
- 1916: Yale
- 1919–1920: Yale
- Position: Guard

Coaching career (HC unless noted)
- 1922–1923: Colorado Mines

Head coaching record
- Overall: 6–7–1

Accomplishments and honors

Awards
- Consensus All-American (1920); 2× Third-team All-American (1918, 1919); First-team All-Service (1917)

John Timothy Callahan (March 29, 1895 – May 14, 1976) was an American football player and coach. He attended preparatory school at the Phillips Academy in Andover, Massachusetts, and then enrolled at Yale University. He played college football at the guard position for the Yale Bulldogs in 1916 and 1919 to 1920, and was a consensus first-team selection on the 1920 College Football All-America Team. His education at Yale was interrupted during World War I by service as a pilot in the Naval Aviation Corps. He was stationed at Newport, Rhode Island, and later in South America, before being discharged in 1919. Callahan was captain of the 1920 Yale Bulldogs football team while his brother Henry "Mike" Callahan was captain of the 1920 Princeton Tigers football team.

== Head coaching record ==
Year	Team	Overall	Conference	Standing	Bowl/playoffs
Colorado Mines Orediggers (Rocky Mountain Conference) (1922–1923)
1922	Colorado Mines	4–2–1	3–2–1	4th	
1923	Colorado Mines	2–5	1–5	T–8th	
Colorado Mines:		6–7–1	4–7–1		
Total:		6–7–1			
