= 1920 Lafayette football team =

American football club

1920 Lafayette football
- Conference: Independent
- Record: 5–3
- Head coach: Jock Sutherland (2nd season)
- Captain: Joseph Lehecka
- Home stadium: March Field

1920 Eastern college football independents records
	Conf.			Overall
Team	W	L	T	W		L		T
Boston College		–		8	–	0	–	0
Harvard		–		8	–	0	–	1
Princeton		–		6	–	0	–	1
Penn State		–		7	–	0	–	2
Pittsburgh		–		6	–	0	–	2
Army		–		7	–	2	–	0
Dartmouth		–		7	–	2	–	0
Cornell		–		6	–	2	–	0
Syracuse		–		6	–	2	–	1
Geneva		–		5	–	2	–	1
New Hampshire		–		5	–	2	–	1
Brown		–		6	–	3	–	0
Bucknell		–		6	–	3	–	0
Washington & Jefferson		–		6	–	3	–	1
Penn		–		6	–	4	–	0
Carnegie Tech		–		5	–	3	–	0
Lafayette		–		5	–	3	–	0
Holy Cross		–		5	–	3	–	0
Williams		–		5	–	3	–	0
Yale		–		5	–	3	–	0
Fordham		–		4	–	3	–	0
Franklin & Marshall		–		3	–	2	–	2
Boston University		–		4	–	3	–	1
Columbia		–		4	–	4	–	0
Duquesne		–		3	–	3	–	1
Vermont		–		3	–	5	–	0
NYU		–		2	–	5	–	1
Rhode Island State		–		0	–	4	–	4
Tufts		–		2	–	6	–	0
Rutgers		–		2	–	7	–	0
Buffalo		–		1	–	4	–	0
Colgate		–		1	–	5	–	2
Villanova		–		1	–	5	–	1
Drexel		–		0	–	6	–	0

The 1920 Lafayette football team was an American football team that represented Lafayette College as an independent during the 1920 college football season. In its second season under head coach Jock Sutherland, the team compiled a 5–3 record. Joseph Lehecka was the team captain. The team played its home games at March Field in Easton, Pennsylvania.

== Schedule ==
Date	Opponent	Site	Result	Attendance	Source
October 2	Muhlenberg	March Field; Easton, PA	W 20–0		
October 9	at Navy	Worden Field; Annapolis, MD	L 7–12		
October 16	at Penn	Franklin Field; Philadelphia, PA	L 0–7		
October 23	Catholic University	March Field; Easton, PA	W 84–0		
October 30	at Pittsburgh	Forbes Field; Pittsburgh, PA	L 0–14	15,000	
November 6	Bucknell	March Field; Easton, PA	W 10–7		
November 13	Villanova	March Field; Easton, PA	W 34–0		
November 20	Lehigh	March Field; Easton, PA (rivalry)	W 27–7	14,000	
