= 1920 Harvard Crimson football team =

American college football season

1920 Harvard Crimson football
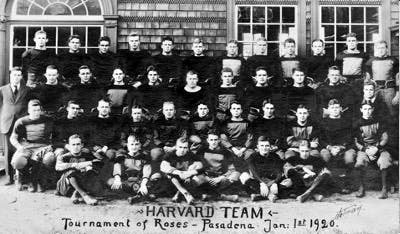
- Harvard team that played the 1920 Rose Bowl

Co-national champion (Boand)
- Conference: Independent
- Record: 8–0–1
- Head coach: Bob Fisher (2nd season)
- Home stadium: Harvard Stadium

1920 Eastern college football independents records
	Conf.			Overall
Team	W	L	T	W		L		T
Boston College		–		8	–	0	–	0
Harvard		–		8	–	0	–	1
Princeton		–		6	–	0	–	1
Penn State		–		7	–	0	–	2
Pittsburgh		–		6	–	0	–	2
Army		–		7	–	2	–	0
Dartmouth		–		7	–	2	–	0
Cornell		–		6	–	2	–	0
Syracuse		–		6	–	2	–	1
Geneva		–		5	–	2	–	1
New Hampshire		–		5	–	2	–	1
Brown		–		6	–	3	–	0
Bucknell		–		6	–	3	–	0
Washington & Jefferson		–		6	–	3	–	1
Penn		–		6	–	4	–	0
Carnegie Tech		–		5	–	3	–	0
Lafayette		–		5	–	3	–	0
Holy Cross		–		5	–	3	–	0
Williams		–		5	–	3	–	0
Yale		–		5	–	3	–	0
Fordham		–		4	–	3	–	0
Franklin & Marshall		–		3	–	2	–	2
Boston University		–		4	–	3	–	1
Columbia		–		4	–	4	–	0
Duquesne		–		3	–	3	–	1
Vermont		–		3	–	5	–	0
NYU		–		2	–	5	–	1
Rhode Island State		–		0	–	4	–	4
Tufts		–		2	–	6	–	0
Rutgers		–		2	–	7	–	0
Buffalo		–		1	–	4	–	0
Colgate		–		1	–	5	–	2
Villanova		–		1	–	5	–	1
Drexel		–		0	–	6	–	0

The 1920 Harvard Crimson football team was an American football team that represented Harvard University as an independent during the 1920 college football season. In its second year under head coach Bob Fisher, the Crimson compiled an 8–0–1 record, shut out seven of nine opponents, and outscored all opponents by a total of 208 to 28.

There was no contemporaneous system in 1920 for determining a national champion. However, Harvard was retroactively named as the co-national champion by the Boand System. The majority of selectors have chosen California (9–0 record) as the national champion for 1920.

Harvard guard Tom Woods was selected as consensus first-team player on the 1920 All-America team. Other notable players on the 1920 Harvard team included halfback George Owen, fullback Arnold Horween, back Frederic Cameron Church Jr., center Charles Frederick Havemeyer, guard James Randolph Tolbert, and tackle Robert Minturn Sedgwick.

== Schedule ==
Date	Time	Opponent	Site	Result	Attendance	Source
September 25		Holy Cross	Harvard Stadium; Boston, MA	W 3–0	10,000	
October 2		Maine	Harvard Stadium; Boston, MA	W 41–0	10,000	
October 9		Valparaiso	Harvard Stadium; Boston, MA	W 21–0	17,000	
October 16		Williams	Harvard Stadium; Boston, MA	W 38–0	18,000	
October 23		Centre	Harvard Stadium; Boston, MA	W 31–14	40,000	
October 30		Virginia	Harvard Stadium; Boston, MA	W 24–0		
November 6		Princeton	Harvard Stadium; Boston, MA (rivalry)	T 14–14	44,000	
November 13	2:00 p.m.	Brown	Harvard Stadium; Boston, MA	W 27–0	30,000–35,000	
November 20		at Yale	Yale Bowl; New Haven, CT (rivalry)	W 9–0	close to 80,000	
All times are in Eastern time

== Roster ==
- Wesley Brocker, G
- Fiske Brown, G
- Charles Buell, QB
- Vinton Chapin, HB
- Frederic Cameron Church Jr., HB
- K. Clarke, E
- Cooper, T
- John Crocker, E
- Eastman, T
- Finley, E
- Roscoe Fitts, HB
- Fitzgerald, QB
- Gaston, E
- Mitchell Gratwick, HB
- Hamilton, FB
- Holmes, G
- Arnold Horween, HB
- Humphrey, HB
- Frank Johnson, QB
- Philip Kunhardt, T
- Benoni Lockwood, T
- Charles Macomber, E
- Morrison, G
- Olmstead, G
- George Owen
- Francis Rouillard, HB
- Robert Minturn Sedgwick, T
- Seldon, E
- Stillman, FB
- Charles Tierney, C
- Wales, QB
- Wharton, HB
- Tom Woods, G
