= 1920 Duquesne Dukes football team =

American college football season

1920 Duquesne Dukes football
- Conference: Independent
- Record: 3–3–1
- Head coach: Jake Stahl (1st season)

1920 Eastern college football independents records
	Conf.			Overall
Team	W	L	T	W		L		T
Boston College		–		8	–	0	–	0
Harvard		–		8	–	0	–	1
Princeton		–		6	–	0	–	1
Penn State		–		7	–	0	–	2
Pittsburgh		–		6	–	0	–	2
Army		–		7	–	2	–	0
Dartmouth		–		7	–	2	–	0
Cornell		–		6	–	2	–	0
Syracuse		–		6	–	2	–	1
Geneva		–		5	–	2	–	1
New Hampshire		–		5	–	2	–	1
Brown		–		6	–	3	–	0
Bucknell		–		6	–	3	–	0
Washington & Jefferson		–		6	–	3	–	1
Penn		–		6	–	4	–	0
Carnegie Tech		–		5	–	3	–	0
Lafayette		–		5	–	3	–	0
Holy Cross		–		5	–	3	–	0
Williams		–		5	–	3	–	0
Yale		–		5	–	3	–	0
Fordham		–		4	–	3	–	0
Franklin & Marshall		–		3	–	2	–	2
Boston University		–		4	–	3	–	1
Columbia		–		4	–	4	–	0
Duquesne		–		3	–	3	–	1
Vermont		–		3	–	5	–	0
NYU		–		2	–	5	–	1
Rhode Island State		–		0	–	4	–	4
Tufts		–		2	–	6	–	0
Rutgers		–		2	–	7	–	0
Buffalo		–		1	–	4	–	0
Colgate		–		1	–	5	–	2
Villanova		–		1	–	5	–	1
Drexel		–		0	–	6	–	0

The 1920 Duquesne Dukes football team represented Duquesne University during the 1920 college football season. The head coach was Jake Stahl, coaching his first season with the Dukes.

== Schedule ==
Date	Opponent	Site	Result	Source
September 25	Marietta	Pittsburgh, PA	L 0–20	
October 2	at Detroit	Mack Park; Detroit, MI	L 0–34	
October 15	Muskingum	Pittsburgh, PA	W 35–0	
October 23	Mount St. Mary's	Pittsburgh, PA	T 0–0	
October 30	at Thiel	Greenville, PA	L 14–19	
November 6	St. Bonaventure	Pittsburgh, PA	W 19–0	
November 20	Dayton	Pittsburgh, PA	W 14–0	
