= 1920 Buffalo Bisons football team =

American college football season

1920 Buffalo Bisons football
- Conference: Independent
- Record: 1–4
- Head coach: Art Powell (5th season)
- Captains: Carl Baisch; Frank McCollum
- Home stadium: University of Buffalo Field

1920 Eastern college football independents records
	Conf.			Overall
Team	W	L	T	W		L		T
Boston College		–		8	–	0	–	0
Harvard		–		8	–	0	–	1
Princeton		–		6	–	0	–	1
Penn State		–		7	–	0	–	2
Pittsburgh		–		6	–	0	–	2
Army		–		7	–	2	–	0
Dartmouth		–		7	–	2	–	0
Cornell		–		6	–	2	–	0
Syracuse		–		6	–	2	–	1
Geneva		–		5	–	2	–	1
New Hampshire		–		5	–	2	–	1
Brown		–		6	–	3	–	0
Bucknell		–		6	–	3	–	0
Washington & Jefferson		–		6	–	3	–	1
Penn		–		6	–	4	–	0
Carnegie Tech		–		5	–	3	–	0
Lafayette		–		5	–	3	–	0
Holy Cross		–		5	–	3	–	0
Williams		–		5	–	3	–	0
Yale		–		5	–	3	–	0
Fordham		–		4	–	3	–	0
Franklin & Marshall		–		3	–	2	–	2
Boston University		–		4	–	3	–	1
Columbia		–		4	–	4	–	0
Duquesne		–		3	–	3	–	1
Vermont		–		3	–	5	–	0
NYU		–		2	–	5	–	1
Rhode Island State		–		0	–	4	–	4
Tufts		–		2	–	6	–	0
Rutgers		–		2	–	7	–	0
Buffalo		–		1	–	4	–	0
Colgate		–		1	–	5	–	2
Villanova		–		1	–	5	–	1
Drexel		–		0	–	6	–	0

The 1920 Buffalo Bisons football team represented the University of Buffalo as an independent during the 1920 college football season. Led by Art Powell in his fifth season as head coach, the team compiled a record of 1–4.

== Schedule ==
Date	Time	Opponent	Site	Result	Source
October 9		Thiel	University of Buffalo Field; Buffalo, NY	L 0–13	
October 16		St. Lawrence	University of Buffalo Field; Buffalo, NY	L 0–20	
October 22		at Alfred	Alfred Field; Alfred, NY	L 3–7	
October 30		Hobart	University of Buffalo Field; Buffalo, NY	L 2–20	
November 13	2:15 p.m.	at Canisius	The Villa; Buffalo, NY	W 12–0	
All times are in Eastern time
