= 1920 NYU Violets football team =

American college football season

1920 NYU Violets football
- Conference: Independent
- Record: 2–5–1
- Head coach: Frank Gargan (1st season)
- Home stadium: Ohio Field

1920 Eastern college football independents records
	Conf.			Overall
Team	W	L	T	W		L		T
Boston College		–		8	–	0	–	0
Harvard		–		8	–	0	–	1
Princeton		–		6	–	0	–	1
Penn State		–		7	–	0	–	2
Pittsburgh		–		6	–	0	–	2
Army		–		7	–	2	–	0
Dartmouth		–		7	–	2	–	0
Cornell		–		6	–	2	–	0
Syracuse		–		6	–	2	–	1
Geneva		–		5	–	2	–	1
New Hampshire		–		5	–	2	–	1
Brown		–		6	–	3	–	0
Bucknell		–		6	–	3	–	0
Washington & Jefferson		–		6	–	3	–	1
Penn		–		6	–	4	–	0
Carnegie Tech		–		5	–	3	–	0
Lafayette		–		5	–	3	–	0
Holy Cross		–		5	–	3	–	0
Williams		–		5	–	3	–	0
Yale		–		5	–	3	–	0
Fordham		–		4	–	3	–	0
Franklin & Marshall		–		3	–	2	–	2
Boston University		–		4	–	3	–	1
Columbia		–		4	–	4	–	0
Duquesne		–		3	–	3	–	1
Vermont		–		3	–	5	–	0
NYU		–		2	–	5	–	1
Rhode Island State		–		0	–	4	–	4
Tufts		–		2	–	6	–	0
Rutgers		–		2	–	7	–	0
Buffalo		–		1	–	4	–	0
Colgate		–		1	–	5	–	2
Villanova		–		1	–	5	–	1
Drexel		–		0	–	6	–	0

The 1920 NYU Violets football team was an American football team that represented New York University as an independent during the 1920 college football season. In their first year under head coach Frank Gargan, the team compiled a 2–5–1 record.

== Schedule ==
Date	Opponent	Site	Result	Attendance	Source
October 2	USS Pennsylvania	Ohio Field; Bronx, NY	W 46–0		
October 9	at Columbia	South Field; New York, NY	L 7–14	12,000–14,000	
October 16	at Wesleyan	Andrus Field; Middletown, CT	T 13–13		
October 23	at Hamilton	Clinton, NY	L 13–14		
November 2	Trinity (CT)	Ohio Field; Bronx, NY	W 31–20		
November 6	Union (NY)	Ohio Field; Bronx, NY	L 9–7		
November 13	Bates	Ohio Field; Bronx, NY	L 18–21		
November 20	at Stevens	Castle Point Field; Hoboken, NJ	L 14–21		
