= 1920 Dartmouth Indians football team =

American college football season

1920 Dartmouth Indians football
- Conference: Independent
- Record: 7–2
- Head coach: Clarence Spears (4th season)
- Captain: James Robertson

1920 Eastern college football independents records
	Conf.			Overall
Team	W	L	T	W		L		T
Boston College		–		8	–	0	–	0
Harvard		–		8	–	0	–	1
Princeton		–		6	–	0	–	1
Penn State		–		7	–	0	–	2
Pittsburgh		–		6	–	0	–	2
Army		–		7	–	2	–	0
Dartmouth		–		7	–	2	–	0
Cornell		–		6	–	2	–	0
Syracuse		–		6	–	2	–	1
Geneva		–		5	–	2	–	1
New Hampshire		–		5	–	2	–	1
Brown		–		6	–	3	–	0
Bucknell		–		6	–	3	–	0
Washington & Jefferson		–		6	–	3	–	1
Penn		–		6	–	4	–	0
Carnegie Tech		–		5	–	3	–	0
Lafayette		–		5	–	3	–	0
Holy Cross		–		5	–	3	–	0
Williams		–		5	–	3	–	0
Yale		–		5	–	3	–	0
Fordham		–		4	–	3	–	0
Franklin & Marshall		–		3	–	2	–	2
Boston University		–		4	–	3	–	1
Columbia		–		4	–	4	–	0
Duquesne		–		3	–	3	–	1
Vermont		–		3	–	5	–	0
NYU		–		2	–	5	–	1
Rhode Island State		–		0	–	4	–	4
Tufts		–		2	–	6	–	0
Rutgers		–		2	–	7	–	0
Buffalo		–		1	–	4	–	0
Colgate		–		1	–	5	–	2
Villanova		–		1	–	5	–	1
Drexel		–		0	–	6	–	0

The 1920 Dartmouth football team was an American football team that represented Dartmouth College as an independent during the 1920 college football season. In its fourth and final season under head coach Clarence Spears, the team compiled a 7–2 record and outscored opponents by a total of 199 to 68. James Robertson was the team captain.

On November 27, 1920, Dartmouth played Washington, 28–7, in the inaugural game at Husky Stadium.

== Schedule ==
Date	Opponent	Site	Result	Attendance	Source
October 2	Norwich	Hanover, NH	W 31–0		
October 9	at Penn State	New Beaver Field; State College, PA	L 7–14	6,000	
October 16	Holy Cross	Hanover, NH	W 27–14		
October 23	Syracuse	Hanover, NH	L 0–10		
October 30	Tufts	Hanover, NH	W 34–7		
November 6	vs. Cornell	Polo Grounds; New York, NY (rivalry)	W 14–3	20,000	
November 13	at Penn	Franklin Field; Philadelphia, PA	W 44–7		
November 20	vs. Brown	Braves Field; Boston, MA	W 14–6	20,000	
November 27	at Washington	Husky Stadium; Seattle, WA	W 28–7	24,500	
