= 1920 Army Cadets football team =

American college football season

1920 Army Cadets football
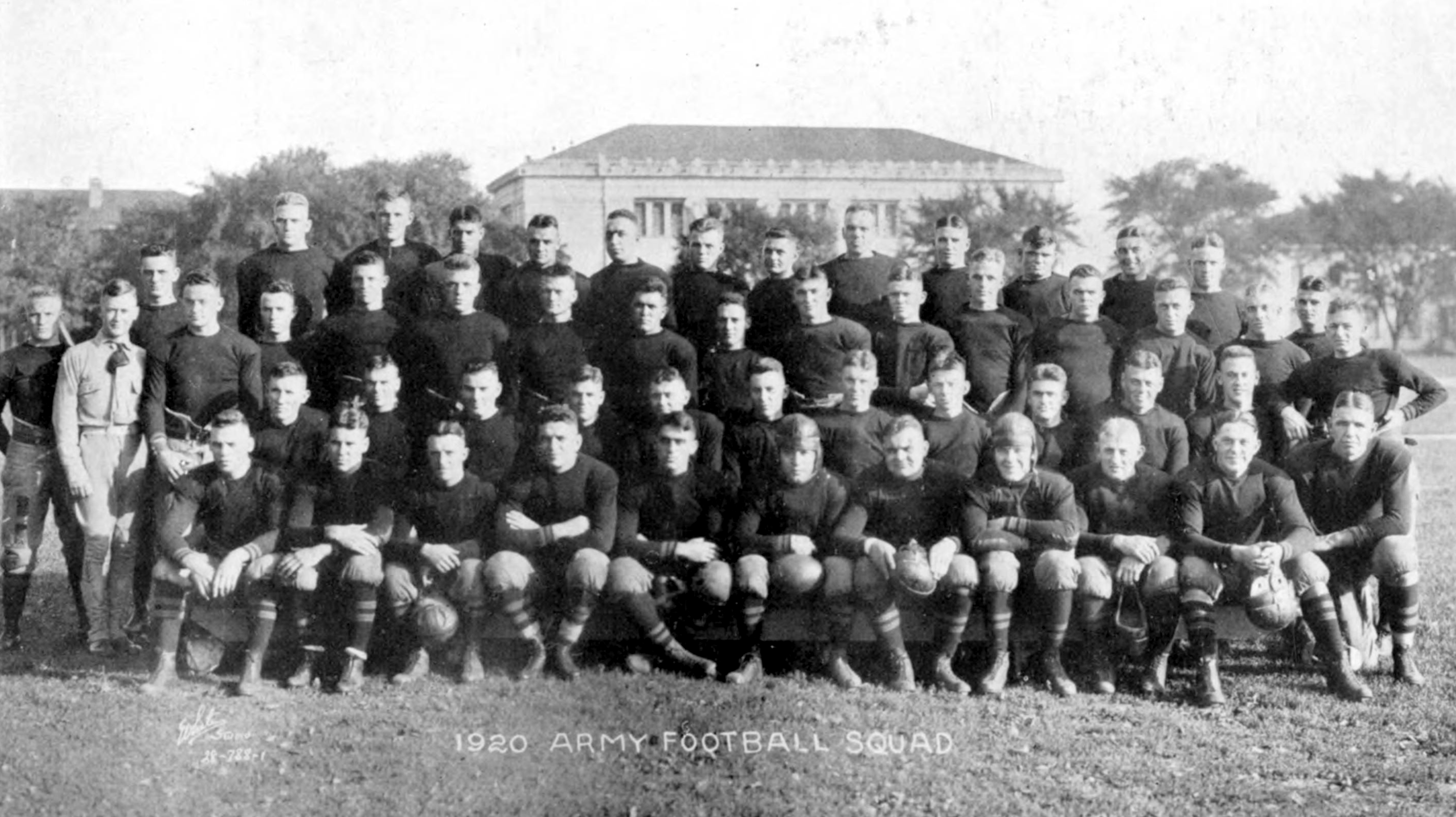
- Conference: Independent
- Record: 7–2
- Head coach: Charles Dudley Daly (6th season)
- Captain: Glenn Wilhide
- Home stadium: The Plain

1920 Eastern college football independents records
	Conf.			Overall
Team	W	L	T	W		L		T
Boston College		–		8	–	0	–	0
Harvard		–		8	–	0	–	1
Princeton		–		6	–	0	–	1
Penn State		–		7	–	0	–	2
Pittsburgh		–		6	–	0	–	2
Army		–		7	–	2	–	0
Dartmouth		–		7	–	2	–	0
Cornell		–		6	–	2	–	0
Syracuse		–		6	–	2	–	1
Geneva		–		5	–	2	–	1
New Hampshire		–		5	–	2	–	1
Brown		–		6	–	3	–	0
Bucknell		–		6	–	3	–	0
Washington & Jefferson		–		6	–	3	–	1
Penn		–		6	–	4	–	0
Carnegie Tech		–		5	–	3	–	0
Lafayette		–		5	–	3	–	0
Holy Cross		–		5	–	3	–	0
Williams		–		5	–	3	–	0
Yale		–		5	–	3	–	0
Fordham		–		4	–	3	–	0
Franklin & Marshall		–		3	–	2	–	2
Boston University		–		4	–	3	–	1
Columbia		–		4	–	4	–	0
Duquesne		–		3	–	3	–	1
Vermont		–		3	–	5	–	0
NYU		–		2	–	5	–	1
Rhode Island State		–		0	–	4	–	4
Tufts		–		2	–	6	–	0
Rutgers		–		2	–	7	–	0
Buffalo		–		1	–	4	–	0
Colgate		–		1	–	5	–	2
Villanova		–		1	–	5	–	1
Drexel		–		0	–	6	–	0

The 1920 Army Cadets football team represented the United States Military Academy as an independent during the 1920 college football season. In their sixth season under head coach Charles Dudley Daly, the Cadets compiled a 7–2 record, shut out five of their nine opponents, and outscored all opponents by a combined total of 314 to 47. In the annual Army–Navy Game, the Cadets lost to the Midshipmen 7–0.

Two players were recognized on the All-America team. Fullback Walter French was selected as a first-team All-American by Football World magazine and as a second-team All-American by Walter Camp and the United Press. Guard Fritz Breidster was selected as a second-team All-American by Walter Eckersall and a third-team player by Walter Camp.

== Schedule ==
Date	Opponent	Site	Result	Attendance	Source
October 2	Union (NY)	The Plain; West Point, NY	W 35–0		
October 2	Marshall	The Plain; West Point, NY	W 38–0		
October 9	Middlebury	The Plain; West Point, NY	W 27–0		
October 16	Springfield	The Plain; West Point, NY	W 26–7		
October 23	Tufts	The Plain; West Point, NY	W 28–6		
October 30	Notre Dame	The Plain; West Point, NY (rivalry)	L 17–27	10,000	
November 6	Lebanon Valley	The Plain; West Point, NY	W 53–0		
November 13	Bowdoin	The Plain; West Point, NY	W 90–0		
November 27	vs. Navy	Polo Grounds; New York, NY (Army–Navy Game)	L 0–7		
