= 1920 Drexel Dragons football team =

American college football season

1920 Drexel Dragons football
- Conference: Independent
- Record: 0–6
- Head coach: William McAvoy (1st season)
- Captain: George Crichton

1920 Eastern college football independents records
	Conf.			Overall
Team	W	L	T	W		L		T
Boston College		–		8	–	0	–	0
Harvard		–		8	–	0	–	1
Princeton		–		6	–	0	–	1
Penn State		–		7	–	0	–	2
Pittsburgh		–		6	–	0	–	2
Army		–		7	–	2	–	0
Dartmouth		–		7	–	2	–	0
Cornell		–		6	–	2	–	0
Syracuse		–		6	–	2	–	1
Geneva		–		5	–	2	–	1
New Hampshire		–		5	–	2	–	1
Brown		–		6	–	3	–	0
Bucknell		–		6	–	3	–	0
Washington & Jefferson		–		6	–	3	–	1
Penn		–		6	–	4	–	0
Carnegie Tech		–		5	–	3	–	0
Lafayette		–		5	–	3	–	0
Holy Cross		–		5	–	3	–	0
Williams		–		5	–	3	–	0
Yale		–		5	–	3	–	0
Fordham		–		4	–	3	–	0
Franklin & Marshall		–		3	–	2	–	2
Boston University		–		4	–	3	–	1
Columbia		–		4	–	4	–	0
Duquesne		–		3	–	3	–	1
Vermont		–		3	–	5	–	0
NYU		–		2	–	5	–	1
Rhode Island State		–		0	–	4	–	4
Tufts		–		2	–	6	–	0
Rutgers		–		2	–	7	–	0
Buffalo		–		1	–	4	–	0
Colgate		–		1	–	5	–	2
Villanova		–		1	–	5	–	1
Drexel		–		0	–	6	–	0

The 1920 Drexel Dragons football team represented Drexel Institute—now known as Drexel University—in the 1920 college football season. Led by William McAvoy in his first season as head coach, the team compiled a record of 0–6.

== Schedule ==
Date	Opponent	Site	Result	Source
October 16	at Albright	Reading, PA	L 0–41	
October 23	at Susquehanna	Meredith Field; Sunbury, PA	L 0–59	
October 30	Western Maryland	Philadelphia, PA	L 13–14	
November 6	at Washington College	Chestertown, MD	L 0–41	
November 13	at Muhlenberg	Allentown, PA	L 0–82	
November 20	Gallaudet	Philadelphia, PA	L 0–13	

== Roster ==
1920 Drexel Dragons football team roster
Players			Coaches
Offense: Pos. / # / Name / Class; FB / / George Chrichton (C)	Defense: Pos. / # / Name / Class	Special teams: Pos. / # / Name / Class	Head coach: William McAvoy (Lafayette); Coordinators/assistant coaches Legend: (C) Team captain; (S) Suspended; (I) Ineligible; Injured; Redshirt
