= 1920 Colgate football team =

American college football season

1920 Colgate football
- Conference: Independent
- Record: 1–5–2
- Head coach: Ellery Huntington Jr. (2nd season)
- Captain: Roy Wooster
- Home stadium: Whitnall Field

1920 Eastern college football independents records
	Conf.			Overall
Team	W	L	T	W		L		T
Boston College		–		8	–	0	–	0
Harvard		–		8	–	0	–	1
Princeton		–		6	–	0	–	1
Penn State		–		7	–	0	–	2
Pittsburgh		–		6	–	0	–	2
Army		–		7	–	2	–	0
Dartmouth		–		7	–	2	–	0
Cornell		–		6	–	2	–	0
Syracuse		–		6	–	2	–	1
Geneva		–		5	–	2	–	1
New Hampshire		–		5	–	2	–	1
Brown		–		6	–	3	–	0
Bucknell		–		6	–	3	–	0
Washington & Jefferson		–		6	–	3	–	1
Penn		–		6	–	4	–	0
Carnegie Tech		–		5	–	3	–	0
Lafayette		–		5	–	3	–	0
Holy Cross		–		5	–	3	–	0
Williams		–		5	–	3	–	0
Yale		–		5	–	3	–	0
Fordham		–		4	–	3	–	0
Franklin & Marshall		–		3	–	2	–	2
Boston University		–		4	–	3	–	1
Columbia		–		4	–	4	–	0
Duquesne		–		3	–	3	–	1
Vermont		–		3	–	5	–	0
NYU		–		2	–	5	–	1
Rhode Island State		–		0	–	4	–	4
Tufts		–		2	–	6	–	0
Rutgers		–		2	–	7	–	0
Buffalo		–		1	–	4	–	0
Colgate		–		1	–	5	–	2
Villanova		–		1	–	5	–	1
Drexel		–		0	–	6	–	0

The 1920 Colgate football team was an American football team that represented Colgate University as an independent during the 1920 college football season. In its second season under head coach Ellery Huntington Jr., the team compiled a 1–5–2 record and was outscored by a total of 119 to 114. D. Belford West was the team captain. The team played its home games on Whitnall Field in Hamilton, New York.

== Schedule ==
Date	Opponent	Site	Result	Attendance	Source
October 2	Susquehanna	Whitnall Field; Hamilton, NY	T 0–0		
October 9	Allegheny	Whitnall Field; Hamilton, NY	T 7–7		
October 16	at Brown	Andrew's Field; Providence, RI	L 0–14		
October 23	at Cornell	Schoellkopf Field; Ithaca, NY (rivalry)	L 6–42	> 10,000	
October 30	at Yale	Yale Bowl; New Haven, CT	L 7–21		
November 6	Rochester	Whitnall Field; Hamilton, NY	L 14–21		
November 13	St. Bonaventure	Whitnall Field; Hamilton, NY	W 80–0		
November 20	at Syracuse	Archbold Stadium; Syracuse, NY (rivalry)	L 0–14	18,000	
