= 1920 Bucknell football team =

American college football season

1920 Bucknell football
- Conference: Independent
- Record: 6–3
- Head coach: Pete Reynolds (2nd season)

1920 Eastern college football independents records
	Conf.			Overall
Team	W	L	T	W		L		T
Boston College		–		8	–	0	–	0
Harvard		–		8	–	0	–	1
Princeton		–		6	–	0	–	1
Penn State		–		7	–	0	–	2
Pittsburgh		–		6	–	0	–	2
Army		–		7	–	2	–	0
Dartmouth		–		7	–	2	–	0
Cornell		–		6	–	2	–	0
Syracuse		–		6	–	2	–	1
Geneva		–		5	–	2	–	1
New Hampshire		–		5	–	2	–	1
Brown		–		6	–	3	–	0
Bucknell		–		6	–	3	–	0
Washington & Jefferson		–		6	–	3	–	1
Penn		–		6	–	4	–	0
Carnegie Tech		–		5	–	3	–	0
Lafayette		–		5	–	3	–	0
Holy Cross		–		5	–	3	–	0
Williams		–		5	–	3	–	0
Yale		–		5	–	3	–	0
Fordham		–		4	–	3	–	0
Franklin & Marshall		–		3	–	2	–	2
Boston University		–		4	–	3	–	1
Columbia		–		4	–	4	–	0
Duquesne		–		3	–	3	–	1
Vermont		–		3	–	5	–	0
NYU		–		2	–	5	–	1
Rhode Island State		–		0	–	4	–	4
Tufts		–		2	–	6	–	0
Rutgers		–		2	–	7	–	0
Buffalo		–		1	–	4	–	0
Colgate		–		1	–	5	–	2
Villanova		–		1	–	5	–	1
Drexel		–		0	–	6	–	0

The 1920 Bucknell football team was an American football team that represented Bucknell University as an independent during the 1920 college football season. In its second season under head coach Pete Reynolds, the team compiled a 6–3 record.

== Schedule ==
Date	Opponent	Site	Result	Attendance	Source
October 2	at Penn	Franklin Field; Philadelphia, PA	L 0–7		
October 9	Ursinus	Tustin Field; Lewisburg, PA	W 48–0		
October 16	at Navy	Worden Field; Annapolis, MD	L 2–7		
October 23	at Muhlenberg	Allentown, PA	W 43–0		
October 30	St. Bonaventure	Tustin Field; Lewisburg, PA	W 51–0		
November 6	at Lafayette	March Field; Easton, PA	L 7–10		
November 13	vs. Gettysburg	Harrisburg, PA	W 45–0		
November 20	Susquehanna	Tustin Field; Lewisburg, PA	W 28–7		
November 25	vs. Dickinson	Williamsport, PA	W 20–6		
