= 1920 Brown Bears football team =

American college football season

1920 Brown Bears football
- Conference: Independent
- Record: 6–3
- Head coach: Edward N. Robinson (19th season)
- Captain: E. G. Armstrong
- Home stadium: Andrews Field

1920 Eastern college football independents records
	Conf.			Overall
Team	W	L	T	W		L		T
Boston College		–		8	–	0	–	0
Harvard		–		8	–	0	–	1
Princeton		–		6	–	0	–	1
Penn State		–		7	–	0	–	2
Pittsburgh		–		6	–	0	–	2
Army		–		7	–	2	–	0
Dartmouth		–		7	–	2	–	0
Cornell		–		6	–	2	–	0
Syracuse		–		6	–	2	–	1
Geneva		–		5	–	2	–	1
New Hampshire		–		5	–	2	–	1
Brown		–		6	–	3	–	0
Bucknell		–		6	–	3	–	0
Washington & Jefferson		–		6	–	3	–	1
Penn		–		6	–	4	–	0
Carnegie Tech		–		5	–	3	–	0
Lafayette		–		5	–	3	–	0
Holy Cross		–		5	–	3	–	0
Williams		–		5	–	3	–	0
Yale		–		5	–	3	–	0
Fordham		–		4	–	3	–	0
Franklin & Marshall		–		3	–	2	–	2
Boston University		–		4	–	3	–	1
Columbia		–		4	–	4	–	0
Duquesne		–		3	–	3	–	1
Vermont		–		3	–	5	–	0
NYU		–		2	–	5	–	1
Rhode Island State		–		0	–	4	–	4
Tufts		–		2	–	6	–	0
Rutgers		–		2	–	7	–	0
Buffalo		–		1	–	4	–	0
Colgate		–		1	–	5	–	2
Villanova		–		1	–	5	–	1
Drexel		–		0	–	6	–	0

The 1920 Brown Bears football team represented Brown University as an independent during the 1920 college football season. Led by 19th-year head coach Edward N. Robinson, Brown compiled a record of 6–3.

== Schedule ==
Date	Time	Opponent	Site	Result	Attendance	Source
September 25		Rhode Island State	Andrews Field; Providence, RI (rivalry)	W 25–0		
October 2		Amherst	Andrews Field; Providence, RI	W 13–0		
October 9		Maine	Andrews Field; Providence, RI	W 32–7		
October 16		Colgate	Andrews Field; Providence, RI	W 14–0		
October 23		Springfield	Andrews Field; Providence, RI	W 14–0		
October 30		Vermont	Andrews Field; Providence, RI	W 35–0		
November 6		at Yale	Yale Bowl; New Haven, CT	L 10–14	40,000	
November 13	2:00 p.m.	at Harvard	Harvard Stadium; Boston, MA	L 0–27	30,000–35,000	
November 20		vs. Dartmouth	Braves Field; Boston, MA	L 6–14	20,000	
All times are in Eastern time
