= 1920 Yale Bulldogs football team =

American college football season

1920 Yale Bulldogs football
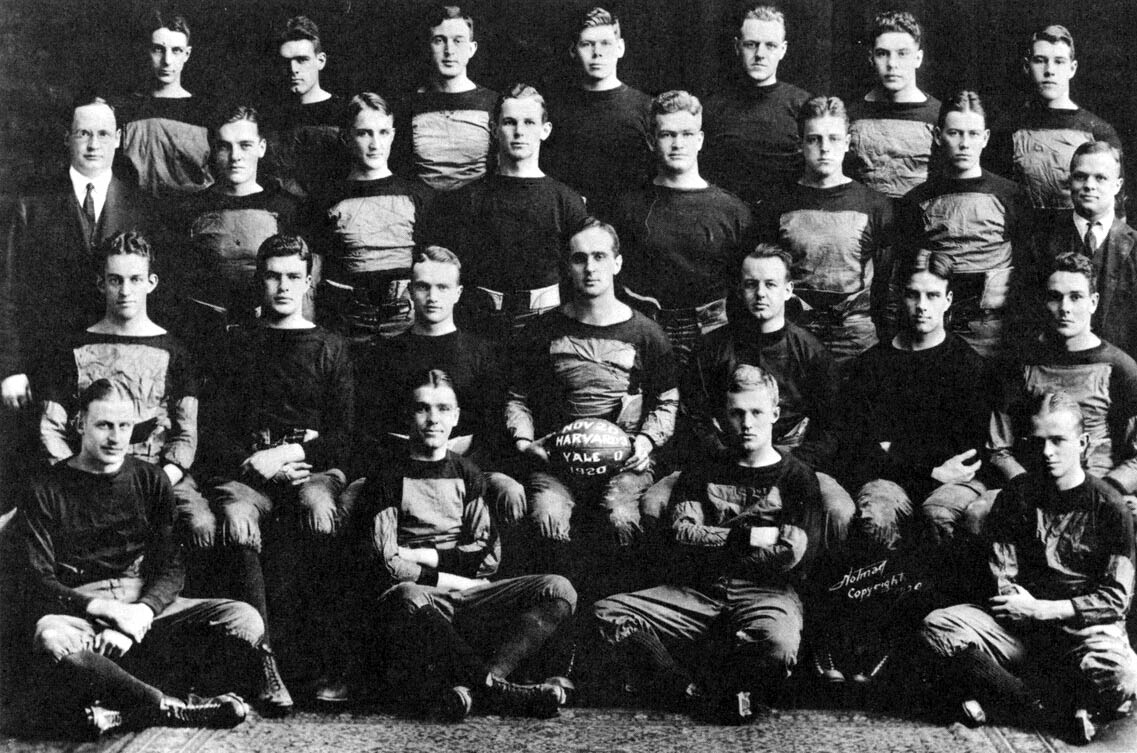
- Conference: Independent
- Record: 5–3
- Head coach: Tad Jones (3rd season)
- Offensive scheme: Single-wing
- Captain: Tim Callahan
- Home stadium: Yale Bowl

1920 Eastern college football independents records
| | Conf. | | | Overall |
| Team | W | L | T | W | | L | | T |
|---|---|---|---|---|---|---|---|---|
| Boston College | | – | | 8 | – | 0 | – | 0 |
| Harvard | | – | | 8 | – | 0 | – | 1 |
| Princeton | | – | | 6 | – | 0 | – | 1 |
| Penn State | | – | | 7 | – | 0 | – | 2 |
| Pittsburgh | | – | | 6 | – | 0 | – | 2 |
| Army | | – | | 7 | – | 2 | – | 0 |
| Dartmouth | | – | | 7 | – | 2 | – | 0 |
| Cornell | | – | | 6 | – | 2 | – | 0 |
| Syracuse | | – | | 6 | – | 2 | – | 1 |
| Geneva | | – | | 5 | – | 2 | – | 1 |
| New Hampshire | | – | | 5 | – | 2 | – | 1 |
| Brown | | – | | 6 | – | 3 | – | 0 |
| Bucknell | | – | | 6 | – | 3 | – | 0 |
| Washington & Jefferson | | – | | 6 | – | 3 | – | 1 |
| Penn | | – | | 6 | – | 4 | – | 0 |
| Carnegie Tech | | – | | 5 | – | 3 | – | 0 |
| Lafayette | | – | | 5 | – | 3 | – | 0 |
| Holy Cross | | – | | 5 | – | 3 | – | 0 |
| Williams | | – | | 5 | – | 3 | – | 0 |
| Yale | | – | | 5 | – | 3 | – | 0 |
| Fordham | | – | | 4 | – | 3 | – | 0 |
| Franklin & Marshall | | – | | 3 | – | 2 | – | 2 |
| Boston University | | – | | 4 | – | 3 | – | 1 |
| Columbia | | – | | 4 | – | 4 | – | 0 |
| Duquesne | | – | | 3 | – | 3 | – | 1 |
| Vermont | | – | | 3 | – | 5 | – | 0 |
| NYU | | – | | 2 | – | 5 | – | 1 |
| Rhode Island State | | – | | 0 | – | 4 | – | 4 |
| Tufts | | – | | 2 | – | 6 | – | 0 |
| Rutgers | | – | | 2 | – | 7 | – | 0 |
| Buffalo | | – | | 1 | – | 4 | – | 0 |
| Colgate | | – | | 1 | – | 5 | – | 2 |
| Villanova | | – | | 1 | – | 5 | – | 1 |
| Drexel | | – | | 0 | – | 6 | – | 0 |

The 1920 Yale Bulldogs football team represented Yale University in the 1920 college football season. The Bulldogs finished with a 5–3 record under third-year head coach Tad Jones. Yale guard Tim Callahan was a consensus selection for the 1920 College Football All-America Team, receiving first team honors from Walter Camp, the United Press, and the International News Service. Yale's other guard, John Acosta, also received first-team All-America honors from Walter Eckersall.

== Schedule ==
| Date | Opponent | Site | Result | Attendance | Source |
|---|---|---|---|---|---|
| October 2 | Carnegie Tech | Yale Bowl; New Haven, CT | W 44–0 | | |
| October 9 | North Carolina | Yale Bowl; New Haven, CT | W 21–0 | | |
| October 16 | Boston College | Yale Bowl; New Haven, CT | L 13–21 | 30,000 | |
| October 23 | West Virginia | Yale Bowl; New Haven, CT | W 24–0 | | |
| October 30 | Colgate | Yale Bowl; New Haven, CT | W 21–7 | | |
| November 6 | Brown | Yale Bowl; New Haven, CT | W 14–10 | 40,000 | |
| November 13 | at Princeton | Palmer Stadium; Princeton, NJ (rivalry) | L 0–20 | 50,000 | |
| November 20 | Harvard | Yale Bowl; New Haven, CT (rivalry) | L 0–9 | close to 80,000 | |
