= 1920 Boston University football team =

American college football season

1920 Boston University football
- Conference: Independent
- Record: 4–3–1
- Head coach: Percy Wendell (1st season)
- Home stadium: Braves Field

1920 Eastern college football independents records
	Conf.			Overall
Team	W	L	T	W		L		T
Boston College		–		8	–	0	–	0
Harvard		–		8	–	0	–	1
Princeton		–		6	–	0	–	1
Penn State		–		7	–	0	–	2
Pittsburgh		–		6	–	0	–	2
Army		–		7	–	2	–	0
Dartmouth		–		7	–	2	–	0
Cornell		–		6	–	2	–	0
Syracuse		–		6	–	2	–	1
Geneva		–		5	–	2	–	1
New Hampshire		–		5	–	2	–	1
Brown		–		6	–	3	–	0
Bucknell		–		6	–	3	–	0
Washington & Jefferson		–		6	–	3	–	1
Penn		–		6	–	4	–	0
Carnegie Tech		–		5	–	3	–	0
Lafayette		–		5	–	3	–	0
Holy Cross		–		5	–	3	–	0
Williams		–		5	–	3	–	0
Yale		–		5	–	3	–	0
Fordham		–		4	–	3	–	0
Franklin & Marshall		–		3	–	2	–	2
Boston University		–		4	–	3	–	1
Columbia		–		4	–	4	–	0
Duquesne		–		3	–	3	–	1
Vermont		–		3	–	5	–	0
NYU		–		2	–	5	–	1
Rhode Island State		–		0	–	4	–	4
Tufts		–		2	–	6	–	0
Rutgers		–		2	–	7	–	0
Buffalo		–		1	–	4	–	0
Colgate		–		1	–	5	–	2
Villanova		–		1	–	5	–	1
Drexel		–		0	–	6	–	0

The 1920 Boston University football team was an American football team that represented Boston University as an independent during the 1920 college football season. The team compiled a 4–3–1 record and outscored opponents by a total of 49 to 48.

In July 1920, Percy Wendell was hired at the school's head football coach. Wendell had been an All-American football fullback at Harvard. He had not been active in football since leaving Harvard. Wendell's arrival led to a new enthusiasm for football among the student body.

Wendell spent only one season at Boston University, departing in 1921 for Williams College.

== Schedule ==
Date	Opponent	Site	Result	Attendance	Source
September 25	at Maine	Orono, ME	T 0–0		
October 2	at Worcester Tech	Alumni Stadium; Worcester, MA	W 7–0		
October 9	New Hampshire	Braves Field; Boston, MA	L 0–7	2,000	
October 16	Middlebury	Braves Field; Boston, MA	L 0–7		
October 23	at Rhode Island State	Kingston, RI	W 7–0		
October 30	Connecticut	Braves Field; Boston, MA	W 28–0		
November 6	at Boston College	Braves Field; Boston, MA (rivalry)	L 0–34		
November 11	Norwich	Braves Field; Boston, MA	W 7–0		
