= 1920 Rhode Island State football team =

American college football season

1920 Rhode Island State football
- Conference: Independent
- Record: 0–4–4
- Head coach: Frank Keaney (1st season)

1920 Eastern college football independents records
	Conf.			Overall
Team	W	L	T	W		L		T
Boston College		–		8	–	0	–	0
Harvard		–		8	–	0	–	1
Princeton		–		6	–	0	–	1
Penn State		–		7	–	0	–	2
Pittsburgh		–		6	–	0	–	2
Army		–		7	–	2	–	0
Dartmouth		–		7	–	2	–	0
Cornell		–		6	–	2	–	0
Syracuse		–		6	–	2	–	1
Geneva		–		5	–	2	–	1
New Hampshire		–		5	–	2	–	1
Brown		–		6	–	3	–	0
Bucknell		–		6	–	3	–	0
Washington & Jefferson		–		6	–	3	–	1
Penn		–		6	–	4	–	0
Carnegie Tech		–		5	–	3	–	0
Lafayette		–		5	–	3	–	0
Holy Cross		–		5	–	3	–	0
Williams		–		5	–	3	–	0
Yale		–		5	–	3	–	0
Fordham		–		4	–	3	–	0
Franklin & Marshall		–		3	–	2	–	2
Boston University		–		4	–	3	–	1
Columbia		–		4	–	4	–	0
Duquesne		–		3	–	3	–	1
Vermont		–		3	–	5	–	0
NYU		–		2	–	5	–	1
Rhode Island State		–		0	–	4	–	4
Tufts		–		2	–	6	–	0
Rutgers		–		2	–	7	–	0
Buffalo		–		1	–	4	–	0
Colgate		–		1	–	5	–	2
Villanova		–		1	–	5	–	1
Drexel		–		0	–	6	–	0

The 1920 Rhode Island football team was an American football team that represented Rhode Island State College (later renamed the University of Rhode Island) as an independent during the 1920 college football season. The team compiled a 0–4–4 record.

Prior to the 1920 season, Rhode Island State hired Frank Keaney as the coach of its athletic teams. Keaney served as Rhode Island State's head football coach through the 1940 season. He was the basketball and baseball coach through the 1948 season. In 1960, he was inducted into the Basketball Hall of Fame.

== Schedule ==
Date	Opponent	Site	Result	Source
September 25	at Brown	Andrews Field; Providence, RI (rivalry)	L 0–25	
October 2	at Wesleyan	Andrus Field; Middletown, CT	L 0–20	
October 16	at Maine	Orono, ME	T 7–7	
October 23	Boston University	Kingston, RI	L 0–7	
October 30	at Union (NY)	Schenectady, NY	T 7–7	
November 6	at Massachusetts	Alumni Field; Amherst, MA	T 7–7	
November 13	Worcester Tech	Kingston, RI	L 0–10	
November 20	at Connecticut	Gardner Dow Field; Storrs, CT (rivalry)	T 0–0	
