= 1920 Columbia Lions football team =

American college football season

1920 Columbia Lions football
- Conference: Independent
- Record: 4–4
- Head coach: Frank "Buck" O'Neill (1st season)
- Captain: John F. Kienninger
- Home stadium: South Field, Polo Grounds

1920 Eastern college football independents records
	Conf.			Overall
Team	W	L	T	W		L		T
Boston College		–		8	–	0	–	0
Harvard		–		8	–	0	–	1
Princeton		–		6	–	0	–	1
Penn State		–		7	–	0	–	2
Pittsburgh		–		6	–	0	–	2
Army		–		7	–	2	–	0
Dartmouth		–		7	–	2	–	0
Cornell		–		6	–	2	–	0
Syracuse		–		6	–	2	–	1
Geneva		–		5	–	2	–	1
New Hampshire		–		5	–	2	–	1
Brown		–		6	–	3	–	0
Bucknell		–		6	–	3	–	0
Washington & Jefferson		–		6	–	3	–	1
Penn		–		6	–	4	–	0
Carnegie Tech		–		5	–	3	–	0
Lafayette		–		5	–	3	–	0
Holy Cross		–		5	–	3	–	0
Williams		–		5	–	3	–	0
Yale		–		5	–	3	–	0
Fordham		–		4	–	3	–	0
Franklin & Marshall		–		3	–	2	–	2
Boston University		–		4	–	3	–	1
Columbia		–		4	–	4	–	0
Duquesne		–		3	–	3	–	1
Vermont		–		3	–	5	–	0
NYU		–		2	–	5	–	1
Rhode Island State		–		0	–	4	–	4
Tufts		–		2	–	6	–	0
Rutgers		–		2	–	7	–	0
Buffalo		–		1	–	4	–	0
Colgate		–		1	–	5	–	2
Villanova		–		1	–	5	–	1
Drexel		–		0	–	6	–	0

The 1920 Columbia Lions football team was an American football team that represented Columbia University as an independent during the 1920 college football season. In his first season, head coach Frank "Buck" O'Neill led the team to a 4–4 record, but the Lions were outscored 141 to 75 by opponents.

The team played most of its games on South Field, part of the university's campus in Morningside Heights in Upper Manhattan.

== Schedule ==
Date	Opponent	Site	Result	Attendance	Source
October 2	Trinity (CT)	South Field; New York, NY	W 21–0	8,000	
October 9	NYU	South Field; New York, NY	W 14–7	12,000–14,000	
October 16	Amherst	South Field; New York, NY	W 20–7	8,000	
October 23	Wesleyan	South Field; New York, NY	L 0–10	9,000	
October 30	Williams	South Field; New York, NY	W 20–14		
November 6	Swarthmore	South Field; New York, NY	L 7–21		
November 13	at Cornell	Schoellkopf Field; Ithaca, NY (rivalry)	L 7–34	15,000	
November 20	Penn	Polo Grounds; New York, NY	L 7–27	28,000	
