= 1920 Penn Quakers football team =

American college football season

1920 Penn Quakers football
- Conference: Independent
- Record: 6–4
- Head coach: John Heisman (1st season)
- Captain: Bob Hopper
- Home stadium: Franklin Field

1920 Eastern college football independents records
	Conf.			Overall
Team	W	L	T	W		L		T
Boston College		–		8	–	0	–	0
Harvard		–		8	–	0	–	1
Princeton		–		6	–	0	–	1
Penn State		–		7	–	0	–	2
Pittsburgh		–		6	–	0	–	2
Army		–		7	–	2	–	0
Dartmouth		–		7	–	2	–	0
Cornell		–		6	–	2	–	0
Syracuse		–		6	–	2	–	1
Geneva		–		5	–	2	–	1
New Hampshire		–		5	–	2	–	1
Brown		–		6	–	3	–	0
Bucknell		–		6	–	3	–	0
Washington & Jefferson		–		6	–	3	–	1
Penn		–		6	–	4	–	0
Carnegie Tech		–		5	–	3	–	0
Lafayette		–		5	–	3	–	0
Holy Cross		–		5	–	3	–	0
Williams		–		5	–	3	–	0
Yale		–		5	–	3	–	0
Fordham		–		4	–	3	–	0
Franklin & Marshall		–		3	–	2	–	2
Boston University		–		4	–	3	–	1
Columbia		–		4	–	4	–	0
Duquesne		–		3	–	3	–	1
Vermont		–		3	–	5	–	0
NYU		–		2	–	5	–	1
Rhode Island State		–		0	–	4	–	4
Tufts		–		2	–	6	–	0
Rutgers		–		2	–	7	–	0
Buffalo		–		1	–	4	–	0
Colgate		–		1	–	5	–	2
Villanova		–		1	–	5	–	1
Drexel		–		0	–	6	–	0

The 1920 Penn Quakers football team was an American football team that represented the University of Pennsylvania as an independent during the 1920 college football season. In their first season under head coach John Heisman, the Quakers compiled a 6–4 record, shut out five of nine opponents, and outscored all opponents by a total of 167 to 133. The team played its home games at Franklin Field in Philadelphia.

== Schedule ==
Date	Opponent	Site	Result	Attendance	Source
September 25	Delaware	Franklin Field; Philadelphia, PA	W 35–0		
October 2	Bucknell	Franklin Field; Philadelphia, PA	W 7–0		
October 9	Swarthmore	Franklin Field; Philadelphia, PA	W 21–0		
October 16	Lafayette	Franklin Field; Philadelphia, PA	W 7–0		
October 23	VMI	Franklin Field; Philadelphia, PA	L 7–27		
October 30	Penn State	Franklin Field; Philadelphia, PA	L 7–28	30,000	
November 6	Pittsburgh	Franklin Field; Philadelphia, PA	L 21–27	25,500	
November 13	Dartmouth	Franklin Field; Philadelphia, PA	L 7–44		
November 20	at Columbia	Polo Grounds; New York, NY	W 27–7	28,000	
November 25	Cornell	Franklin Field; Philadelphia, PA (rivalry)	W 28–0	35,000	
