= 1920 Fordham Maroon football team =

American college football season

1920 Fordham Maroon football
- Conference: Independent
- Record: 4–3
- Head coach: Joseph DuMoe (1st season)
- Captain: Sylvester Fitzpatrick
- Home stadium: Fordham Field

1920 Eastern college football independents records
	Conf.			Overall
Team	W	L	T	W		L		T
Boston College		–		8	–	0	–	0
Harvard		–		8	–	0	–	1
Princeton		–		6	–	0	–	1
Penn State		–		7	–	0	–	2
Pittsburgh		–		6	–	0	–	2
Army		–		7	–	2	–	0
Dartmouth		–		7	–	2	–	0
Cornell		–		6	–	2	–	0
Syracuse		–		6	–	2	–	1
Geneva		–		5	–	2	–	1
New Hampshire		–		5	–	2	–	1
Brown		–		6	–	3	–	0
Bucknell		–		6	–	3	–	0
Washington & Jefferson		–		6	–	3	–	1
Penn		–		6	–	4	–	0
Carnegie Tech		–		5	–	3	–	0
Lafayette		–		5	–	3	–	0
Holy Cross		–		5	–	3	–	0
Williams		–		5	–	3	–	0
Yale		–		5	–	3	–	0
Fordham		–		4	–	3	–	0
Franklin & Marshall		–		3	–	2	–	2
Boston University		–		4	–	3	–	1
Columbia		–		4	–	4	–	0
Duquesne		–		3	–	3	–	1
Vermont		–		3	–	5	–	0
NYU		–		2	–	5	–	1
Rhode Island State		–		0	–	4	–	4
Tufts		–		2	–	6	–	0
Rutgers		–		2	–	7	–	0
Buffalo		–		1	–	4	–	0
Colgate		–		1	–	5	–	2
Villanova		–		1	–	5	–	1
Drexel		–		0	–	6	–	0

The 1920 Fordham Maroon football team was an American football team that represented Fordham University as an independent during the 1920 college football season. In its first season under coach Joseph DuMoe, Fordham compiled a 4–3 record. Fordham's media guide claims three additional victories, two over Fort H. G. Wright and a second victory over Villanova.

== Schedule ==
Date	Time	Opponent	Site	Result	Attendance	Source
October 2		New York Aggies	Fordham Field; Bronx, NY	W 71–0		
October 9	3:00 p.m.	at Boston College	Alumni Field; Chestnut Hill, MA	L 0–20	7,000	
October 16		Villanova	Fordham Field; Bronx, NY	W 12–6		
October 23		Georgetown	Fordham Field; Bronx, NY	L 16–40		
October 30		at Detroit	Navin Field; Detroit, MI	L 0–39		
November 13		George Washington	Fordham Field; Bronx, NY	W 40–0		
November 20		Muhlenberg	Fordham Field; Bronx, NY	W 13–0		
