= 1920 Geneva Covenanters football team =

Football team

1920 Geneva Covenanters football
- Conference: Independent
- Record: 5–2–1
- Head coach: Philip Henry Bridenbaugh (4th season)

1920 Eastern college football independents records
	Conf.			Overall
Team	W	L	T	W		L		T
Boston College		–		8	–	0	–	0
Harvard		–		8	–	0	–	1
Princeton		–		6	–	0	–	1
Penn State		–		7	–	0	–	2
Pittsburgh		–		6	–	0	–	2
Army		–		7	–	2	–	0
Dartmouth		–		7	–	2	–	0
Cornell		–		6	–	2	–	0
Syracuse		–		6	–	2	–	1
Geneva		–		5	–	2	–	1
New Hampshire		–		5	–	2	–	1
Brown		–		6	–	3	–	0
Bucknell		–		6	–	3	–	0
Washington & Jefferson		–		6	–	3	–	1
Penn		–		6	–	4	–	0
Carnegie Tech		–		5	–	3	–	0
Lafayette		–		5	–	3	–	0
Holy Cross		–		5	–	3	–	0
Williams		–		5	–	3	–	0
Yale		–		5	–	3	–	0
Fordham		–		4	–	3	–	0
Franklin & Marshall		–		3	–	2	–	2
Boston University		–		4	–	3	–	1
Columbia		–		4	–	4	–	0
Duquesne		–		3	–	3	–	1
Vermont		–		3	–	5	–	0
NYU		–		2	–	5	–	1
Rhode Island State		–		0	–	4	–	4
Tufts		–		2	–	6	–	0
Rutgers		–		2	–	7	–	0
Buffalo		–		1	–	4	–	0
Colgate		–		1	–	5	–	2
Villanova		–		1	–	5	–	1
Drexel		–		0	–	6	–	0

The 1920 Geneva Covenanters football team was an American football team that represented Geneva College as an independent during the 1920 college football season. Led by fourth-year head coach Philip Henry Bridenbaugh, the team compiled a record of 5–2–1.

== Schedule ==
Date	Time	Opponent	Site	Result	Attendance	Source
October 2		Pittsburgh	Beaver Falls, PA	L 0–47	4,000	
October 9		Muskingum	Beaver Falls, PA	W 34–0		
October 16		at Washington & Jefferson	Washington, PA	L 0–14		
October 23		at Westminster (PA)	New Wilmington, PA	W 7–0	2,500	
October 30	2:45 p.m.	Alfred	Beaver Falls, PA	W 34–0		
November 6		Thiel	Beaver Falls, PA	W 31–0		
November 13		at Grove City	Grove City, PA	T 0–0		
November 20		Allegheny	Beaver Falls, PA	W 19–0		
All times are in Eastern time
