= 1920 Vermont Green and Gold football team =

American college football season

1920 Vermont Green and Gold football
- Conference: Independent
- Record: 3–5
- Head coach: J. Frank Burke (1st season)
- Home stadium: Centennial Field

1920 Eastern college football independents records
	Conf.			Overall
Team	W	L	T	W		L		T
Boston College		–		8	–	0	–	0
Harvard		–		8	–	0	–	1
Princeton		–		6	–	0	–	1
Penn State		–		7	–	0	–	2
Pittsburgh		–		6	–	0	–	2
Army		–		7	–	2	–	0
Dartmouth		–		7	–	2	–	0
Cornell		–		6	–	2	–	0
Syracuse		–		6	–	2	–	1
Geneva		–		5	–	2	–	1
New Hampshire		–		5	–	2	–	1
Brown		–		6	–	3	–	0
Bucknell		–		6	–	3	–	0
Washington & Jefferson		–		6	–	3	–	1
Penn		–		6	–	4	–	0
Carnegie Tech		–		5	–	3	–	0
Lafayette		–		5	–	3	–	0
Holy Cross		–		5	–	3	–	0
Williams		–		5	–	3	–	0
Yale		–		5	–	3	–	0
Fordham		–		4	–	3	–	0
Franklin & Marshall		–		3	–	2	–	2
Boston University		–		4	–	3	–	1
Columbia		–		4	–	4	–	0
Duquesne		–		3	–	3	–	1
Vermont		–		3	–	5	–	0
NYU		–		2	–	5	–	1
Rhode Island State		–		0	–	4	–	4
Tufts		–		2	–	6	–	0
Rutgers		–		2	–	7	–	0
Buffalo		–		1	–	4	–	0
Colgate		–		1	–	5	–	2
Villanova		–		1	–	5	–	1
Drexel		–		0	–	6	–	0

The 1920 Vermont Green and Gold football team was an American football team that represented the University of Vermont as an independent during the 1920 college football season. In their only year under head coach J. Frank Burke, the team compiled a 3–5 record.

== Schedule ==
Date	Opponent	Site	Result	Source
September 25	St. Lawrence	Centennial Field; Burlington, VT	W 10–7	
October 2	at Syracuse	Archbold Stadium; Syracuse, NY	L 0–49	
October 9	Tufts	Centennial Field; Burlington, VT	W 7–0	
October 16	at New Hampshire	College Oval; Durham, NH	W 7–0	
October 23	Massachusetts	Centennial Field; Burlington, VT	L 7–21	
October 30	at Brown	Andrews Field; Providence, RI	L 0–35	
November 6	Norwich	Centennial Field; Burlington, VT	L 7–16	
November 13	at Middlebury	Porter Field; Middlebury, VT	L 0–6	
