= 1920 Holy Cross football team =

American college football season

1920 Holy Cross football
- Conference: Independent
- Record: 5–3
- Head coach: Cleo A. O'Donnell (2nd season)
- Home stadium: Fitton Field

1920 Eastern college football independents records
	Conf.			Overall
Team	W	L	T	W		L		T
Boston College		–		8	–	0	–	0
Harvard		–		8	–	0	–	1
Princeton		–		6	–	0	–	1
Penn State		–		7	–	0	–	2
Pittsburgh		–		6	–	0	–	2
Army		–		7	–	2	–	0
Dartmouth		–		7	–	2	–	0
Cornell		–		6	–	2	–	0
Syracuse		–		6	–	2	–	1
Geneva		–		5	–	2	–	1
New Hampshire		–		5	–	2	–	1
Brown		–		6	–	3	–	0
Bucknell		–		6	–	3	–	0
Washington & Jefferson		–		6	–	3	–	1
Penn		–		6	–	4	–	0
Carnegie Tech		–		5	–	3	–	0
Lafayette		–		5	–	3	–	0
Holy Cross		–		5	–	3	–	0
Williams		–		5	–	3	–	0
Yale		–		5	–	3	–	0
Fordham		–		4	–	3	–	0
Franklin & Marshall		–		3	–	2	–	2
Boston University		–		4	–	3	–	1
Columbia		–		4	–	4	–	0
Duquesne		–		3	–	3	–	1
Vermont		–		3	–	5	–	0
NYU		–		2	–	5	–	1
Rhode Island State		–		0	–	4	–	4
Tufts		–		2	–	6	–	0
Rutgers		–		2	–	7	–	0
Buffalo		–		1	–	4	–	0
Colgate		–		1	–	5	–	2
Villanova		–		1	–	5	–	1
Drexel		–		0	–	6	–	0

The 1920 Holy Cross football team was an American football team that represented the College of the Holy Cross as an independent during the 1920 college football season. In its second season under head coach Cleo A. O'Donnell, the team compiled a 5–3 record. The team played its home games at Fitton Field in Worcester, Massachusetts.

== Schedule ==
Date	Opponent	Site	Result	Attendance	Source
September 25	at Harvard	Harvard Stadium; Boston, MA	L 0–3	10,000	
October 2	U.S. Submarine Base	Fitton Field; Worcester, MA	W 75–0		
October 12	at Springfield	Pratt Field; Springfield, MA	W 17–0	5,000	
October 16	at Dartmouth	Hanover, NH	L 14–27		
October 30	Syracuse	Fitton Field; Worcester, MA	W 3–0	10,000	
November 13	Colby	Fitton Field; Worcester, MA	W 36–0		
November 20	New Hampshire	Fitton Field; Worcester, MA	W 32–0	5,000	
December 4	at Boston College	Braves Field; Boston, MA	L 0–14	40,000	
