= 1920 Syracuse Orangemen football team =

American college football season

1920 Syracuse Orangemen football
- Conference: Independent
- Record: 6–2–1
- Head coach: Chick Meehan (1st season)
- Captain: Doc Alexander
- Home stadium: Archbold Stadium

1920 Eastern college football independents records
	Conf.			Overall
Team	W	L	T	W		L		T
Boston College		–		8	–	0	–	0
Harvard		–		8	–	0	–	1
Princeton		–		6	–	0	–	1
Penn State		–		7	–	0	–	2
Pittsburgh		–		6	–	0	–	2
Army		–		7	–	2	–	0
Dartmouth		–		7	–	2	–	0
Cornell		–		6	–	2	–	0
Syracuse		–		6	–	2	–	1
Geneva		–		5	–	2	–	1
New Hampshire		–		5	–	2	–	1
Brown		–		6	–	3	–	0
Bucknell		–		6	–	3	–	0
Washington & Jefferson		–		6	–	3	–	1
Penn		–		6	–	4	–	0
Carnegie Tech		–		5	–	3	–	0
Lafayette		–		5	–	3	–	0
Holy Cross		–		5	–	3	–	0
Williams		–		5	–	3	–	0
Yale		–		5	–	3	–	0
Fordham		–		4	–	3	–	0
Franklin & Marshall		–		3	–	2	–	2
Boston University		–		4	–	3	–	1
Columbia		–		4	–	4	–	0
Duquesne		–		3	–	3	–	1
Vermont		–		3	–	5	–	0
NYU		–		2	–	5	–	1
Rhode Island State		–		0	–	4	–	4
Tufts		–		2	–	6	–	0
Rutgers		–		2	–	7	–	0
Buffalo		–		1	–	4	–	0
Colgate		–		1	–	5	–	2
Villanova		–		1	–	5	–	1
Drexel		–		0	–	6	–	0

The 1920 Syracuse Orangemen football team represented Syracuse University as an independent during the 1920 college football season. The team was led by first-year head coach Chick Meehan.

== Schedule ==
Date	Opponent	Site	Result	Attendance	Source
September 25	Hobart	Archbold Stadium; Syracuse, NY	W 55–7		
October 2	Vermont	Archbold Stadium; Syracuse, NY	W 49–0		
October 9	Johns Hopkins	Archbold Stadium; Syracuse, NY	W 45–0		
October 16	Pittsburgh	Archbold Stadium; Syracuse, NY (rivalry)	T 7–7	15,000–20,000	
October 23	at Dartmouth	Hanover, NH	W 10–0		
October 30	at Holy Cross	Fitton Field; Worcester, MA	L 0–3	10,000	
November 6	Washington & Jefferson	Archbold Stadium; Syracuse, NY	W 14–0	12,000	
November 13	vs. Maryland	Polo Grounds; New York, NY	L 7–10	3,500	
November 20	Colgate	Archbold Stadium; Syracuse, NY (rivalry)	W 14–0	17,500–18,000	
