= 1920 Cornell Big Red football team =

American college football season

1920 Cornell Big Red football
- Conference: Independent
- Record: 6–2
- Head coach: Gil Dobie (1st season)
- Offensive scheme: Single-wing
- Base defense: 6–3–2
- Captain: Clyde Mayer
- Home stadium: Schoellkopf Field

1920 Eastern college football independents records
	Conf.			Overall
Team	W	L	T	W		L		T
Boston College		–		8	–	0	–	0
Harvard		–		8	–	0	–	1
Princeton		–		6	–	0	–	1
Penn State		–		7	–	0	–	2
Pittsburgh		–		6	–	0	–	2
Army		–		7	–	2	–	0
Dartmouth		–		7	–	2	–	0
Cornell		–		6	–	2	–	0
Syracuse		–		6	–	2	–	1
Geneva		–		5	–	2	–	1
New Hampshire		–		5	–	2	–	1
Brown		–		6	–	3	–	0
Bucknell		–		6	–	3	–	0
Washington & Jefferson		–		6	–	3	–	1
Penn		–		6	–	4	–	0
Carnegie Tech		–		5	–	3	–	0
Lafayette		–		5	–	3	–	0
Holy Cross		–		5	–	3	–	0
Williams		–		5	–	3	–	0
Yale		–		5	–	3	–	0
Fordham		–		4	–	3	–	0
Franklin & Marshall		–		3	–	2	–	2
Boston University		–		4	–	3	–	1
Columbia		–		4	–	4	–	0
Duquesne		–		3	–	3	–	1
Vermont		–		3	–	5	–	0
NYU		–		2	–	5	–	1
Rhode Island State		–		0	–	4	–	4
Tufts		–		2	–	6	–	0
Rutgers		–		2	–	7	–	0
Buffalo		–		1	–	4	–	0
Colgate		–		1	–	5	–	2
Villanova		–		1	–	5	–	1
Drexel		–		0	–	6	–	0

The 1920 Cornell Big Red football team was an American football team that represented Cornell University during the 1920 college football season. In their first season under head coach Gil Dobie, the Big Red compiled a 6–2 record and outscored their opponents by a combined total of 231 to 68.

== Schedule ==
Date	Opponent	Site	Result	Attendance	Source
October 2	Rochester	Schoellkopf Field; Ithaca, NY	W 13–6		
October 9	St. Bonaventure	Schoellkopf Field; Ithaca, NY	W 55–7		
October 16	Union (NY)	Schoellkopf Field; Ithaca, NY	W 60–0		
October 23	Colgate	Schoellkopf Field; Ithaca, NY (rivalry)	W 42–6	> 10,000	
October 30	Rutgers	Schoellkopf Field; Ithaca, NY	W 24–0		
November 6	vs. Dartmouth	Polo Grounds; New York, NY (rivalry)	L 3–14	20,000	
November 13	Columbia	Schoellkopf Field; Ithaca, NY (rivalry)	W 34–7	15,000	
November 25	at Penn	Franklin Field; Philadelphia, PA (rivalry)	L 0–28	35,000	
