= 1920 Williams Ephs football team =

American college football season

1920 Williams Ephs football
- Conference: Independent
- Record: 5–3
- Head coach: Joseph W. Brooks (3rd season)
- Captain: Benny Boynton
- Home stadium: Weston Field

1920 Eastern college football independents records
	Conf.			Overall
Team	W	L	T	W		L		T
Boston College		–		8	–	0	–	0
Harvard		–		8	–	0	–	1
Princeton		–		6	–	0	–	1
Penn State		–		7	–	0	–	2
Pittsburgh		–		6	–	0	–	2
Army		–		7	–	2	–	0
Dartmouth		–		7	–	2	–	0
Cornell		–		6	–	2	–	0
Syracuse		–		6	–	2	–	1
Geneva		–		5	–	2	–	1
New Hampshire		–		5	–	2	–	1
Brown		–		6	–	3	–	0
Bucknell		–		6	–	3	–	0
Washington & Jefferson		–		6	–	3	–	1
Penn		–		6	–	4	–	0
Carnegie Tech		–		5	–	3	–	0
Lafayette		–		5	–	3	–	0
Holy Cross		–		5	–	3	–	0
Williams		–		5	–	3	–	0
Yale		–		5	–	3	–	0
Fordham		–		4	–	3	–	0
Franklin & Marshall		–		3	–	2	–	2
Boston University		–		4	–	3	–	1
Columbia		–		4	–	4	–	0
Duquesne		–		3	–	3	–	1
Vermont		–		3	–	5	–	0
NYU		–		2	–	5	–	1
Rhode Island State		–		0	–	4	–	4
Tufts		–		2	–	6	–	0
Rutgers		–		2	–	7	–	0
Buffalo		–		1	–	4	–	0
Colgate		–		1	–	5	–	2
Villanova		–		1	–	5	–	1
Drexel		–		0	–	6	–	0

The 1920 Williams Ephs football team represented Williams College as an independent during the 1920 college football season. Led by Joseph W. Brooks in his third and final season as head coach, the Ephs compiled a record of 5–3. Benny Boynton led Eastern scorers.

== Schedule ==
Date	Opponent	Site	Result
October 2	RPI	Weston Field; Williamstown, MA	W 63–6
October 9	at Union (NY)	Schenectady, NY	W 35–0
October 16	at Harvard	Harvard Stadium; Boston, MA	L 0–38
October 23	Trinity (CT)	Weston Field; Williamstown, MA	W 62–0
October 30	at Columbia	South Field; New York, NY	L 14–20
November 6	Hamilton	Weston Field; Williamstown, MA	W 82–7
November 13	Wesleyan	Weston Field; Williamstown, MA	W 50–14
November 20	at Amherst	Pratt Field; Amherst, MA (rivalry)	L 7–14
