= 1920 Boston College Eagles football team =

American college football season

1920 Boston College Eagles football
- Conference: Independent
- Record: 8–0
- Head coach: Frank Cavanaugh (2nd season)
- Captain: Luke Urban
- Home stadium: Alumni Field, Braves Field, Fenway Park

1920 Eastern college football independents records
	Conf.			Overall
Team	W	L	T	W		L		T
Boston College		–		8	–	0	–	0
Harvard		–		8	–	0	–	1
Princeton		–		6	–	0	–	1
Penn State		–		7	–	0	–	2
Pittsburgh		–		6	–	0	–	2
Army		–		7	–	2	–	0
Dartmouth		–		7	–	2	–	0
Cornell		–		6	–	2	–	0
Syracuse		–		6	–	2	–	1
Geneva		–		5	–	2	–	1
New Hampshire		–		5	–	2	–	1
Brown		–		6	–	3	–	0
Bucknell		–		6	–	3	–	0
Washington & Jefferson		–		6	–	3	–	1
Penn		–		6	–	4	–	0
Carnegie Tech		–		5	–	3	–	0
Lafayette		–		5	–	3	–	0
Holy Cross		–		5	–	3	–	0
Williams		–		5	–	3	–	0
Yale		–		5	–	3	–	0
Fordham		–		4	–	3	–	0
Franklin & Marshall		–		3	–	2	–	2
Boston University		–		4	–	3	–	1
Columbia		–		4	–	4	–	0
Duquesne		–		3	–	3	–	1
Vermont		–		3	–	5	–	0
NYU		–		2	–	5	–	1
Rhode Island State		–		0	–	4	–	4
Tufts		–		2	–	6	–	0
Rutgers		–		2	–	7	–	0
Buffalo		–		1	–	4	–	0
Colgate		–		1	–	5	–	2
Villanova		–		1	–	5	–	1
Drexel		–		0	–	6	–	0

The 1920 Boston College Eagles football team represented Boston College an independent during the 1920 college football season. Led by second-year head coach Frank Cavanaugh, Boston College compiled a record of 8–0. Cavanaugh hired Wesley Englehorn as an assistant for the year. Luke Urban was the team captain.

== Schedule ==
Date	Time	Opponent	Site	Result	Attendance	Source
October 9	3:00 p.m.	Fordham	Alumni Field; Chestnut Hill, MA	W 20–0	7,000	
October 16		at Yale	Yale Bowl; New Haven, CT	W 21–13	30,000	
October 30		at Springfield	Pratt Field; Springfield, MA	W 12–0		
November 6	2:00 p.m.	Boston University	Braves Field; Boston, MA (rivalry)	W 34–0		
November 13	2:00 p.m.	Tufts	Braves Field; Boston, MA	W 37–0		
November 20	2:00 p.m.	Marietta	Fenway Park; Boston, MA	W 13–3		
November 27		Georgetown	Braves Field; Boston, MA	W 30–0	20,000	
December 4	2:00 p.m.	Holy Cross	Braves Field; Boston, MA (rivalry)	W 14–0	40,000	
All times are in Eastern time
