= 1920 Princeton Tigers football team =

American college football season

1920 Princeton Tigers football

Co-national champion (Boand, Davis)
- Conference: Independent
- Record: 6–0–1
- Head coach: Bill Roper (7th season)
- Offensive scheme: Short punt
- Captain: Henry Callahan
- Home stadium: Palmer Stadium

Uniform
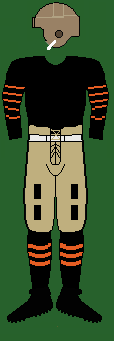

1920 Eastern college football independents records
	Conf.			Overall
Team	W	L	T	W		L		T
Boston College		–		8	–	0	–	0
Harvard		–		8	–	0	–	1
Princeton		–		6	–	0	–	1
Penn State		–		7	–	0	–	2
Pittsburgh		–		6	–	0	–	2
Army		–		7	–	2	–	0
Dartmouth		–		7	–	2	–	0
Cornell		–		6	–	2	–	0
Syracuse		–		6	–	2	–	1
Geneva		–		5	–	2	–	1
New Hampshire		–		5	–	2	–	1
Brown		–		6	–	3	–	0
Bucknell		–		6	–	3	–	0
Washington & Jefferson		–		6	–	3	–	1
Penn		–		6	–	4	–	0
Carnegie Tech		–		5	–	3	–	0
Lafayette		–		5	–	3	–	0
Holy Cross		–		5	–	3	–	0
Williams		–		5	–	3	–	0
Yale		–		5	–	3	–	0
Fordham		–		4	–	3	–	0
Franklin & Marshall		–		3	–	2	–	2
Boston University		–		4	–	3	–	1
Columbia		–		4	–	4	–	0
Duquesne		–		3	–	3	–	1
Vermont		–		3	–	5	–	0
NYU		–		2	–	5	–	1
Rhode Island State		–		0	–	4	–	4
Tufts		–		2	–	6	–	0
Rutgers		–		2	–	7	–	0
Buffalo		–		1	–	4	–	0
Colgate		–		1	–	5	–	2
Villanova		–		1	–	5	–	1
Drexel		–		0	–	6	–	0

The 1920 Princeton Tigers football team was an American football team that represented Princeton University as an independent during the 1920 college football season. They finished with a 6–0–1 record, shut out four of seven opponents, and outscored all opponents by a total of 144 to 23. the sole blemish on the team's record was a 14–14 tie with Harvard in a road game in Boston. Bill Roper was the head coach for the seventh year. Keene Fitzpatrick, Frank Glick, and Jack Winn were assistant coaches. Henry Callahan was the team captain.

There was no contemporaneous system in 1920 for determining a national champion. However, Princeton was retroactively named as the co-national champion by the Boand System and Parke H. Davis. The 1920 California Golden Bears football team were selected as national champion by the majority of selectors.

Two Princeton players, quarterback Donold Lourie and tackle Stan Keck, were selected as consensus first-team players on the 1920 All-America team. Keck was later inducted into the College Football Hall of Fame. Other notable players included fullback Hank Garrity and end Armant Legendre.

== Band ==
The Princeton University Band played its first ever public performance at the Princeton-Maryland football game on October 9, 1920.

== Schedule ==
Date	Opponent	Site	Result	Attendance	Source
October 2	Swarthmore	Palmer Stadium; Princeton, NJ	W 17–6		
October 9	Maryland	Palmer Stadium; Princeton, NJ	W 35–0		
October 16	Washington and Lee	Palmer Stadium; Princeton, NJ	W 34–0		
October 23	Navy	Palmer Stadium; Princeton, NJ	W 14–0		
October 30	West Virginia	Palmer Stadium; Princeton, NJ	W 10–3	7,000	
November 6	at Harvard	Harvard Stadium; Boston, MA (rivalry)	T 14–14	44,000	
November 13	Yale	Palmer Stadium; Princeton, NJ (rivalry)	W 20–0		

== Roster ==
- Henry Callahan, C
- Cleaves, FB
- Davis, E
- Dickinson, G
- Hank Garrity, FB
- Ralph Charles Gilroy, HB
- Halsey, T
- Hooper, T
- Stan Keck, T
- Knox, HB
- Armant Legendre, E
- Donold Lourie, QB
- McMamman, G
- McNemar, T
- McPhee, FB
- Frank Murrey, HB
- Raymond, E
- Spears, G
- Stimson, E
- Thomas, C
- Towers, G
