= 1920 college football season =

American college football season

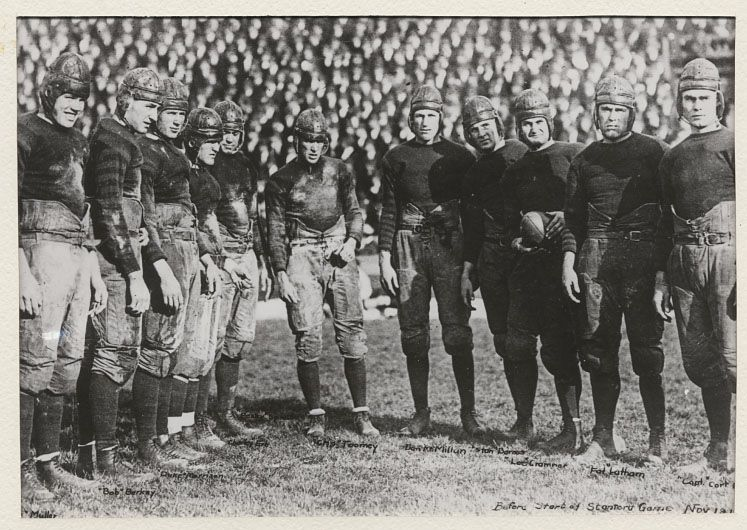
- Cal's "Wonder Team"
- Number of bowls: 2
- Champion(s): California; Princeton

The 1920 college football season had no clear-cut champion, with the Official NCAA Division I Football Records Book listing California, Georgia, Harvard, Notre Dame, and Princeton as national champions. Only California and Princeton claim national championships for the 1920 season. Andy Smith's Pacific Coast Conference champion California "Wonder Team" was the first national champion from the Pacific Coast. Princeton and Harvard were undefeated and with one tie to each other. Notre Dame was led by its first Walter Camp All-American, George Gipp, who died before the year was over.

In the south, fans of either side in Georgia were happy. Georgia and Georgia Tech were both undefeated in Southern play. Georgia Tech lost to Pitt, which was undefeated with two ties. No team scored through Georgia's line, and its backfield was known as the "ten second backfield". (Note: The term "ten second backfield" generally refers to players capable (or thought to be capable) of running a 100-yard dash in 10 seconds—that is, fast runners.) Jimmy Leech of VMI's "Flying Squadron" led the nation in scoring. One writer claimed "he is one of the greatest broken field runners the country has ever seen."

The Southwest Conference saw an undefeated Texas team with the same 9-0 record as the champions cited above. Texas shut out six of the nine teams they faced and scored 282 points while allowing only 13. The final game of the year for Texas against Texas A&M was cited as the real beginning of the storied rivalry between the two schools, which dates back to 1894 and featured 118 contests, in which Texas won 75 and tied 5.

In the Rose Bowl, Cal defeated Ohio State 28–0. Brick Muller completed a 53-yard touchdown pass to Brodie Stephens after receiving a toss from Pesky Sprott, at the time thought impossible.

== Conference and program changes ==
=== Conference establishments ===
- Two new conferences began play in 1920:
  - Minnesota Intercollegiate Athletic Conference – an active NCAA Division III conference

=== Membership changes ===
School	1920 Conference	1921 Conference
Indiana State Normal Fightin' Teachers	Program Re-Established	Independent
Kent State Normal Silver Foxes	Program Established	Independent
Oklahoma Sooners	Southwest	Missouri Valley
Phillips Haymakers	Independent	Southwest
UCLA Bruins	Independent	SCIAC

== Bowl games ==
California defeated Ohio State, 28–0, in the 1921 Rose Bowl. The first and only Fort Worth Classic was held on January 1, 1921, with Centre defeating TCU.

== Conference standings ==
=== Major conference standings ===
1920 Big Ten Conference football standings
	Conf.					Overall
Team	W		L		T	W		L		T
Ohio State $	5	–	0	–	0	7	–	1	–	0
Wisconsin	4	–	1	–	0	6	–	1	–	0
Indiana	3	–	1	–	0	5	–	2	–	0
Illinois	4	–	2	–	0	5	–	2	–	0
Iowa	3	–	2	–	0	5	–	2	–	0
Michigan	2	–	2	–	0	5	–	2	–	0
Northwestern	2	–	3	–	0	3	–	4	–	0
Chicago	2	–	4	–	0	3	–	4	–	0
Purdue	0	–	4	–	0	2	–	5	–	0
Minnesota	0	–	6	–	0	1	–	6	–	0
$ – Conference champion

1920 Missouri Valley Conference football standings
	Conf.					Overall
Team	W		L		T	W		L		T
Oklahoma $	4	–	0	–	1	6	–	0	–	1
Missouri	5	–	1	–	0	7	–	1	–	0
Kansas	3	–	2	–	0	5	–	2	–	1
Iowa State	3	–	2	–	0	4	–	4	–	0
Drake	1	–	3	–	1	4	–	5	–	1
Washington University	1	–	4	–	0	4	–	4	–	0
Grinnell	0	–	2	–	1	3	–	3	–	1
Kansas State	0	–	3	–	1	3	–	3	–	3
$ – Conference champion

1920 Northwest Conference football standings
	Conf.					Overall
Team	W		L		T	W		L		T
Washington State $	3	–	0	–	0	5	–	1	–	0
Oregon	1	–	0	–	1	3	–	2	–	1
Whitman	2	–	1	–	0	3	–	2	–	0
Idaho	2	–	2	–	0	4	–	2	–	0
Oregon Agricultural	0	–	1	–	1	2	–	2	–	2
Willamette	0	–	1	–	0	3	–	1	–	1
Montana	0	–	3	–	0	4	–	3	–	0
$ – Conference champion

1920 Pacific Coast Conference football standings
	Conf.					Overall
Team	W		L		T	W		L		T
California $	3	–	0	–	0	9	–	0	–	0
Stanford	2	–	1	–	0	4	–	3	–	0
Washington State	1	–	1	–	0	5	–	1	–	0
Oregon	1	–	1	–	1	3	–	2	–	1
Oregon Agricultural	1	–	2	–	1	2	–	2	–	2
Washington	0	–	3	–	0	1	–	5	–	0
$ – Conference champion

1920 Rocky Mountain Conference football standings
	Conf.					Overall
Team	W		L		T	W		L		T
Colorado Agricultural $	6	–	0	–	1	6	–	1	–	1
Colorado College	4	–	1	–	1	5	–	1	–	1
Colorado	3	–	1	–	2	4	–	1	–	2
Utah Agricultural	2	–	1	–	1	4	–	2	–	1
Denver	2	–	4	–	0	2	–	4	–	0
Utah	1	–	2	–	1	1	–	5	–	1
Wyoming	2	–	5	–	1	4	–	5	–	1
Colorado Mines	0	–	6	–	0	0	–	6	–	0
Montana State	0	–	0	–	1	4	–	1	–	1
$ – Conference champion

1920 South Atlantic Intercollegiate Athletic Association football standings
	Conf.					Overall
Team	W		L		T	W		L		T
VMI $	5	–	0	–	0	9	–	0	–	0
Maryland	4	–	0	–	0	7	–	2	–	0
Washington and Lee	3	–	0	–	0	5	–	3	–	0
Georgetown	3	–	1	–	0	6	–	4	–	0
Virginia	3	–	1	–	0	5	–	2	–	2
NC State	4	–	2	–	0	7	–	3	–	0
Richmond	2	–	2	–	0	6	–	2	–	0
Davidson	2	–	2	–	0	5	–	5	–	0
VPI	2	–	4	–	0	4	–	6	–	0
Catholic University	1	–	3	–	0	3	–	5	–	0
George Washington	0	–	1	–	0	1	–	6	–	1
St. John's (MD)	0	–	1	–	0	0	–	1	–	0
Johns Hopkins	0	–	2	–	0	0	–	3	–	0
William & Mary	0	–	4	–	0	4	–	5	–	0
North Carolina	0	–	5	–	0	2	–	6	–	0
$ – Conference champion

1920 Southern Intercollegiate Athletic Association football standings
	Conf.					Overall
Team	W		L		T	W		L		T
Georgia +	7	–	0	–	0	8	–	0	–	1
Tulane +	5	–	0	–	0	6	–	2	–	1
Georgia Tech +	4	–	0	–	0	8	–	1	–	0
Alabama	6	–	1	–	0	10	–	1	–	0
Centre	4	–	1	–	0	8	–	2	–	0
Furman	3	–	1	–	0	9	–	1	–	0
South Carolina	3	–	1	–	0	5	–	4	–	0
Tennessee	5	–	2	–	0	7	–	2	–	0
Auburn	4	–	2	–	0	7	–	2	–	0
Mississippi A&M	4	–	2	–	0	5	–	3	–	0
Sewanee	3	–	3	–	1	4	–	3	–	1
Vanderbilt	3	–	3	–	0	4	–	3	–	1
Transylvania	2	–	2	–	0	3	–	4	–	0
Howard (AL)	2	–	3	–	0	3	–	5	–	1
Mississippi College	2	–	4	–	0	3	–	5	–	0
Florida	1	–	2	–	0	6	–	3	–	0
Clemson	2	–	6	–	0	4	–	6	–	1
LSU	1	–	3	–	0	5	–	3	–	1
Chattanooga	1	–	3	–	0	3	–	4	–	1
The Citadel	1	–	4	–	0	2	–	6	–	0
Ole Miss	0	–	2	–	0	4	–	3	–	0
Kentucky	0	–	3	–	1	3	–	4	–	1
Georgetown (KY)	0	–	2	–	0	0	–	3	–	0
Millsaps	0	–	3	–	0	0	–	3	–	0
Mercer	0	–	4	–	0	2	–	6	–	0
Wofford	0	–	4	–	0	0	–	8	–	1
+ – Conference co-champions

1920 Southwest Conference football standings
	Conf.					Overall
Team	W		L		T	W		L		T
Texas $	5	–	0	–	0	9	–	0	–	0
Texas A&M	5	–	1	–	0	6	–	1	–	1
Arkansas	2	–	0	–	1	3	–	2	–	2
Rice	2	–	2	–	1	4	–	2	–	2
Baylor	1	–	2	–	1	4	–	4	–	1
SMU	0	–	4	–	1	3	–	5	–	2
Phillips	0	–	3	–	0	4	–	4	–	2
Oklahoma A&M	0	–	3	–	0	0	–	7	–	1
$ – Conference champion

=== Independents ===
1920 Eastern college football independents records
	Conf.			Overall
Team	W	L	T	W		L		T
Boston College		–		8	–	0	–	0
Harvard		–		8	–	0	–	1
Princeton		–		6	–	0	–	1
Penn State		–		7	–	0	–	2
Pittsburgh		–		6	–	0	–	2
Army		–		7	–	2	–	0
Dartmouth		–		7	–	2	–	0
Cornell		–		6	–	2	–	0
Syracuse		–		6	–	2	–	1
Geneva		–		5	–	2	–	1
New Hampshire		–		5	–	2	–	1
Brown		–		6	–	3	–	0
Bucknell		–		6	–	3	–	0
Washington & Jefferson		–		6	–	3	–	1
Penn		–		6	–	4	–	0
Carnegie Tech		–		5	–	3	–	0
Lafayette		–		5	–	3	–	0
Holy Cross		–		5	–	3	–	0
Williams		–		5	–	3	–	0
Yale		–		5	–	3	–	0
Fordham		–		4	–	3	–	0
Franklin & Marshall		–		3	–	2	–	2
Boston University		–		4	–	3	–	1
Columbia		–		4	–	4	–	0
Duquesne		–		3	–	3	–	1
Vermont		–		3	–	5	–	0
NYU		–		2	–	5	–	1
Rhode Island State		–		0	–	4	–	4
Tufts		–		2	–	6	–	0
Rutgers		–		2	–	7	–	0
Buffalo		–		1	–	4	–	0
Colgate		–		1	–	5	–	2
Villanova		–		1	–	5	–	1
Drexel		–		0	–	6	–	0

1920 Midwestern college football independents records
	Conf.			Overall
Team	W	L	T	W		L		T
Notre Dame		–		9	–	0	–	0
Michigan Mines		–		2	–	0	–	0
Butler		–		7	–	1	–	0
St. Xavier		–		7	–	1	–	0
Detroit		–		8	–	2	–	0
Marquette		–		7	–	2	–	0
Haskell		–		7	–	2	–	1
St. Ignatius (OH)		–		4	–	2	–	0
Iowa State Teachers		–		4	–	2	–	1
South Dakota State		–		4	–	2	–	1
Indiana State		–		3	–	2	–	0
Valparaiso		–		5	–	3	–	0
Nebraska		–		5	–	3	–	1
Central Michigan		–		4	–	3	–	1
Akron		–		4	–	4	–	0
Wabash		–		3	–	4	–	0
Western State Normal (MI)		–		3	–	4	–	0
North Dakota Agricultural		–		2	–	3	–	1
Michigan Agricultural		–		4	–	6	–	0
Earlham		–		2	–	3	–	0
Northern Illinois State		–		3	–	5	–	0
Dayton		–		2	–	4	–	0
Kent State		–		1	–	2	–	0
Saint Louis		–		3	–	6	–	0
Bowling Green		–		1	–	4	–	0
Toledo		–		0	–	3	–	0

1920 Southern college football independents records
	Conf.			Overall
Team	W	L	T	W		L		T
Talladega		–		?	–	0	–	0
Trinity (NC)		–		4	–	0	–	1
Abilene Christian		–		4	–	0	–	1
North Texas State Normal		–		7	–	1	–	0
Presbyterian		–		5	–	1	–	1
Middle Tennessee State Normal		–		4	–	1	–	0
Navy		–		6	–	2	–	0
Spring Hill		–		6	–	2	–	0
Birmingham–Southern		–		6	–	3	–	0
Mississippi Normal		–		4	–	2	–	1
Southwest Texas State		–		4	–	2	–	1
East Tennessee State Normal		–		3	–	2	–	0
West Virginia		–		5	–	4	–	1
Oglethorpe		–		4	–	4	–	1
Delaware		–		3	–	5	–	1
Texas Mines		–		2	–	4	–	0
Marion		–		2	–	5	–	0
Wake Forest		–		2	–	7	–	0
Sam Houston Normal		–		1	–	4	–	2
Western Kentucky State Normal		–		0	–	1	–	0
West Tennessee State Normal		–		0	–	5	–	0
Marshall		–		0	–	8	–	0

1920 Western college football independents records
	Conf.			Overall
Team	W	L	T	W		L		T
Nevada		–		7	–	3	–	1
USC		–		6	–	0	–	0
Arizona		–		6	–	1	–	0
Hawaii		–		6	–	2	–	0
New Mexico A&M		–		5	–	1	–	1
Santa Clara		–		5	–	1	–	0
Gonzaga		–		4	–	3	–	0
Chico State		–		3	–	3	–	0
New Mexico		–		3	–	3	–	0
University Farm		–		3	–	4	–	0
Pacific (CA)		–		1	–	2	–	1
Saint Mary's		–		0	–	3	–	0

=== Minor conferences ===
Conference	Champion(s)	Record
Central Intercollegiate Athletics Association	No champion	—
Inter-Normal Athletic Conference of Wisconsin	Oshkosh Normal	4–0–1
Kansas Collegiate Athletic Conference	Friends (KS)	—
Louisiana Intercollegiate Athletic Association	Unknown	—
Michigan Intercollegiate Athletic Association	Albion	4–0
Minnesota Intercollegiate Athletic Conference	Hamline	2–1–1
Nebraska Intercollegiate Conference	Unknown	—
Ohio Athletic Conference	Wooster	7–0
Oklahoma Intercollegiate Conference	Tulsa	6–0–1
Southern California Intercollegiate Athletic Conference	Pomona	5–0
Southern Intercollegiate Athletic Conference	Morehouse	—

=== Minor conference standings ===
1920 Colored Intercollegiate Athletic Association football standings
	Conf.					Overall
Team	W		L		T	W		L		T
Howard	5	–	0	–	0	7	–	0	–	0
Virginia Union	1	–	1	–	0	6	–	2	–	0
Shaw	2	–	2	–	0	2	–	2	–	1
Hampton	2	–	3	–	0	4	–	3	–	1
Lincoln (PA)	1	–	2	–	0	3	–	2	–	0
Virginia Normal	0	–	3	–	0	3	–	4	–	0

1920 Illinois Intercollegiate Athletic Conference football standings
	Conf.					Overall
Team	W		L		T	W		L		T
Carthage	0	–	4	–	1	1	–	5	–	1

1920 Kansas Collegiate Athletic Conference football standings
	Conf.					Overall
Team	W		L		T	W		L		T
Washburn +	4	–	0	–	2	4	–	2	–	3
Friends +	7	–	1	–	0	7	–	1	–	0
College of Emporia	6	–	1	–	1	6	–	1	–	1
St. Mary's (KS)	4	–	2	–	0	6	–	2	–	0
Baker	4	–	3	–	0	5	–	4	–	0
Bethany (KS)	4	–	3	–	1	4	–	3	–	1
Fairmount	4	–	3	–	2	4	–	3	–	2
Pittsburg Normal	3	–	3	–	0	5	–	4	–	1
Kansas State Normal	2	–	3	–	1	2	–	4	–	2
Hays Normal	2	–	3	–	1	2	–	5	–	1
Southwestern (KS)	2	–	5	–	1	2	–	5	–	2
Ottawa	1	–	6	–	0	1	–	6	–	0
Kansas Wesleyan	0	–	3	–	2	0	–	5	–	3
Sterling	0	–	7	–	1	0	–	7	–	1
+ – Conference co-champions

1920 Michigan Intercollegiate Athletic Association football standings
	Conf.					Overall
Team	W		L		T	W		L		T
Albion $	4	–	0	–	1	4	–	2	–	2
Kalamazoo	3	–	1	–	0	5	–	3	–	1
Hillsdale	2	–	1	–	1	6	–	1	–	1
Michigan State Normal	1	–	2	–	0	6	–	2	–	0
Olivet	1	–	2	–	0	1	–	5	–	0
Alma	0	–	5	–	0	0	–	7	–	0
$ – Conference champion

1920 Minnesota Intercollegiate Athletic Conference football standings
	Conf.					Overall
Team	W		L		T	W		L		T
Carleton	3	–	1	–	0	4	–	1	–	2
Hamline $	2	–	1	–	1	4	–	3	–	1
Macalester	2	–	1	–	1	3	–	2	–	2
St. Olaf	3	–	2	–	0	5	–	2	–	0
St. Thomas (MN)	1	–	3	–	0	2	–	5	–	1
Gustavus Adolphus	0	–	3	–	0	1	–	3	–	0
$ – Conference champion

1920 Missouri Intercollegiate Athletic Association football standings
	Conf.					Overall
Team	W		L		T	W		L		T
Kirksville +	6	–	0	–	0	8	–	0	–	0
William Jewell +	5	–	0	–	2	5	–	1	–	2
Missouri Mines +	4	–	0	–	0	4	–	4	–	0
Missouri Wesleyan *	3	–	1	–	2	4	–	2	–	2
Warrensburg	4	–	3	–	0	5	–	3	–	1
Springfield (MO)	2	–	4	–	0	2	–	6	–	0
Tarkio	1	–	2	–	1	3	–	3	–	1
Missouri Valley	2	–	4	–	0	3	–	4	–	0
Drury †	1	–	3	–	0	1	–	5	–	0
Westminster (MO)	1	–	4	–	1	1	–	4	–	2
Central (MO)	1	–	5	–	0	1	–	6	–	0
Maryville (MO)	0	–	2	–	0	0	–	3	–	0
Cape Girardeau	0	–	2	–	0	0	–	5	–	0
+ – Conference co-champions; * – Missouri Wesleyan forfeited a win over Kirksville † – Drury forfeited wins over William Jewell and Missouri Mines

1920 Nebraska Intercollegiate Conference football standings
	Conf.					Overall
Team	W		L		T	W		L		T
Grand Island	6	–	0	–	1	6	–	0	–	2
Doane	5	–	0	–	1	5	–	1	–	1
Nebraska Wesleyan	4	–	0	–	1	6	–	2	–	2
Omaha	5	–	0	–	0	7	–	1	–	0
Hastings	5	–	2	–	1	5	–	2	–	1
Peru Normal	5	–	4	–	0	5	–	4	–	0
Midland	3	–	6	–	0	3	–	6	–	0
York (NE)	2	–	5	–	0	2	–	5	–	0
Wayne Normal	1	–	3	–	0	1	–	4	–	1
Cotner	1	–	6	–	0	1	–	6	–	0
Kearney Normal	1	–	7	–	0	1	–	7	–	0
Nebraska Central	0	–	6	–	0	0	–	6	–	0
Championship: Grand Island 0, Nebraska Wesleyan 0

1920 Ohio Athletic Conference football standings
	Conf.					Overall
Team	W		L		T	W		L		T
Wooster $	7	–	0	–	0	9	–	0	–	0
Wittenberg	5	–	0	–	0	8	–	0	–	0
Ohio State	2	–	0	–	0	7	–	1	–	0
Denison	5	–	1	–	1	6	–	1	–	1
Oberlin	5	–	2	–	0	5	–	2	–	0
Heidelberg	3	–	2	–	0	7	–	2	–	0
Cincinnati	3	–	2	–	0	4	–	5	–	0
Miami (OH)	3	–	2	–	1	5	–	2	–	1
Mount Union	3	–	3	–	0	6	–	3	–	0
Ohio Wesleyan	3	–	3	–	0	4	–	3	–	0
Ohio Northern	2	–	3	–	0	3	–	4	–	0
Akron	2	–	4	–	0	4	–	4	–	0
Case	2	–	5	–	1	2	–	8	–	1
Ohio	1	–	3	–	0	4	–	3	–	0
Kenyon	1	–	6	–	1	2	–	5	–	1
Western Reserve	1	–	6	–	0	2	–	8	–	0
Hiram	0	–	6	–	0	0	–	9	–	0
$ – Conference champion

1920 South Dakota Intercollegiate Conference football standings
	Conf.					Overall
Team	W		L		T	W		L		T
Yankton $	4	–	0	–	1	5	–	1	–	2
Dakota Wesleyan	3	–	1	–	0	4	–	3	–	0
Huron	2	–	1	–	1	2	–	2	–	1
Northern Normal	1	–	1	–	0	3	–	2	–	0
Sioux Falls	1	–	2	–	0	1	–	3	–	0
South Dakota Mines	0	–	1	–	0	5	–	1	–	0
Columbus (SD)	0	–	5	–	0	1	–	5	–	0
$ – Conference champion

1920 Southern California Conference football standings
	Conf.					Overall
Team	W		L		T	W		L		T
Pomona $	5	–	0	–	0	6	–	1	–	0
Occidental	3	–	2	–	0	4	–	3	–	0
Whittier	3	–	2	–	0	3	–	2	–	0
Caltech	2	–	2	–	1	3	–	3	–	1
Redlands	1	–	3	–	1	2	–	4	–	1
Southern Branch	0	–	5	–	0	0	–	5	–	0
$ – Conference champion

1920 Spokane Intercollegiate Conference football standings
	Conf.					Overall
Team	W		L		T	W		L		T
Spokane University $	6	–	1	–	0	?	–	?	–	?
Cheney Normal	5	–	2	–	0	5	–	2	–	0
Spokane College	2	–	4	–	0	?	–	?	–	?
Whitworth	0	–	6	–	0	?	–	?	–	?
$ – Conference champion

1920 Wisconsin Normal Athletic Conference football standings
	Conf.					Overall
Team	W		L		T	W		L		T
Oshkosh Normal $	4	–	0	–	1	6	–	1	–	1
Eau Claire Normal	2	–	0	–	0	4	–	0	–	0
River Falls Normal	2	–	1	–	1	3	–	1	–	3
La Crosse Normal	3	–	2	–	0	4	–	2	–	1
Milwaukee Normal	2	–	2	–	0	3	–	4	–	1
Stevens Point Normal	1	–	1	–	1	3	–	2	–	1
Whitewater Normal	1	–	3	–	0	2	–	4	–	0
Platteville Normal	0	–	3	–	1	3	–	4	–	2
Superior Normal	0	–	3	–	0	1	–	3	–	0
Stout Institute	0	–	0	–	0	2	–	2	–	0
$ – Conference champion

== Awards and honors ==
=== All-Americans ===
The consensus All-America team included:

Position	Name	Height	Weight (lbs.)	Class	Hometown	Team
QB	Donold Lourie	5'11"	164	Sr.	Peru, Illinois	Princeton
HB	Gaylord Stinchcomb	5'8"	157	Sr.	Sycamore, Ohio	Ohio State
HB	Charley Way	5'8"	144	Sr.	Embreeville, Pennsylvania	Penn State
FB	George Gipp	6'1"	180	Sr.	Laurium, Michigan	Notre Dame
E	Chuck Carney	6'1"	190	Jr.	Chicago, Illinois	Illinois
E	Bill Fincher	6'0"	182	Sr.	Atlanta, Georgia	Georgia Tech
T	Stan Keck	5'11"	206	Jr.	Greensburg, Pennsylvania	Princeton
G	Tim Callahan			Sr.	Lawrence, Massachusetts	Yale
G	Tom Woods			Sr.	Boston, Massachusetts	Harvard
C	Herb Stein	6'1"	186	Jr.	Warren, Ohio	Pittsburgh
G	Iolas Huffman	5'11"	228	Jr.	Chandlersville, Ohio	Ohio State
T	Ralph Scott	6'2"	235	Sr.	Dewey, Wisconsin	Wisconsin
E	Luke Urban	5'8"	165	Sr.	Fall River, Massachusetts	Boston College

=== Statistical leaders ===
- Player scoring most points: Jimmy Leech, VMI, 210
- Player scoring most touchdowns, Jimmy Leech, 26
- Total offense leader: Jimmy Leech, 1771
- Rushing yards leader: Jimmy Leech, 1723
- Rushing avg leader: Buck Flowers, Georgia Tech, 10.2
- Receptions leader: Eddie Anderson, Notre Dame, 17
- Receiving yards leader: Eddie Anderson, 293
