= List of Wake Forest Demon Deacons men's basketball seasons =

This is a list of seasons completed by the Wake Forest Demon Deacons men's college basketball team.

== Seasons ==
Statistics overview
| Season | Coach | Overall | Conference | Standing | Postseason |
|---|---|---|---|---|---|
J.R. Crozier (Independent) (1905–1917)
| 1905–06 | J.R. Crozier | 3–3 | | | |
| 1906–07 | J.R. Crozier | 4–0 | | | |
| 1907–08 | J.R. Crozier | 8–3 | | | |
| 1908–09 | J.R. Crozier | 6–1 | | | |
| 1909–10 | J.R. Crozier | 1–0 | | | |
| 1910–11 | J.R. Crozier | 8–7 | | | |
| 1911–12 | J.R. Crozier | 9–6 | | | |
| 1912–13 | J.R. Crozier | 9–7 | | | |
| 1913–14 | J.R. Crozier | 10–7 | | | |
| 1914–15 | J.R. Crozier | 12–4 | | | |
| 1915–16 | J.R. Crozier | 16–2 | | | |
| 1916–17 | J.R. Crozier | 9–6 | | | |
| J.R. Crozier: | | 95–46 (.674) | | | |
E. T. MacDonnell (Independent) (1917–1918)
| 1917–18 | E. T. MacDonnell | 4–12 | | | |
Irving Carlyle (Independent) (1918–1919)
| 1918–19 | Irving Carlyle | 6–10 | | | |
Bill Holding (Independent) (1919–1920)
| 1919–20 | Bill Holding | 9–4 | | | |
J. L. White Jr. (Independent) (1920–1921)
| 1920–21 | J. L. White Jr. | 7–10 | | | |
Bill Holding (Independent) (1921–1922)
| 1921–22 | Bill Holding | 11–6 | | | |
Phil Utley (Independent) (1922–1923)
| 1922–23 | Phil Utley | 12–5 | | | |
Hank Garrity (Independent) (1923–1925)
| 1923–24 | Hank Garrity | 18–7 | | | |
| 1924–25 | Hank Garrity | 15–7 | | | |
| Hank Garrity: | | 33–14 (.702) | | | |
R.S. Hayes (Independent) (1925–1926)
| 1925–26 | R.S. Hayes | 13–6 | | | |
James Baldwin (Independent) (1926–1928)
| 1926–27 | James Baldwin | 22–3 | | | |
| 1927–28 | James Baldwin | 6–14 | | | |
| James Baldwin: | | 28–17 (.622) | | | |
Pat Miller (Independent) (1928–1930)
| 1928–29 | Pat Miller | 5–9 | | | |
| 1929–30 | Pat Miller | 2–11 | | | |
| Pat Miller: | | 7–20 (.259) | | | |
R. S. Hayes (Independent) (1930–1931)
| 1930–31 | R. S. Hayes | 8–10 | | | |
Fred Emmerson (Independent) (1931–1933)
| 1931–32 | Fred Emmerson | 4–8 | | | |
| 1932–33 | Fred Emmerson | 5–8 | | | |
| Fred Emmerson: | | 9–16 (.360) | | | |
Murray Greason (Independent) (1933–1936)
| 1933–34 | Murray Greason | 5–9 | | | |
| 1934–35 | Murray Greason | 6–10 | | | |
| 1935–36 | Murray Greason | 9–12 | | | |
Murray Greason (Southern Conference) (1936–1953)
| 1936–37 | Murray Greason | 15–6 | 9–4 | 3rd | |
| 1937–38 | Murray Greason | 7–12 | 7–8 | 9th | |
| 1938–39 | Murray Greason | 18–6 | 15–3 | 1st | NCAA Elite Eight |
| 1939–40 | Murray Greason | 13–9 | 10–5 | 4th | |
| 1940–41 | Murray Greason | 9–9 | 7–6 | 8th | |
| 1941–42 | Murray Greason | 16–8 | 13–5 | 3rd | |
| 1942–43 | Murray Greason | 1–10 | 1–10 | 14th | |
| 1943–44 | No team | | | | |
| 1944–45 | Murray Greason | 3–14 | 0–6 | 13th | |
| 1945–46 | Murray Greason | 12–6 | 8–5 | 4th | |
| 1946–47 | Murray Greason | 11–13 | 8–9 | 11th | |
| 1947–48 | Murray Greason | 18–11 | 8–7 | T–8th | |
| 1948–49 | Murray Greason | 11–13 | 7–7 | T–7th | |
| 1949–50 | Murray Greason | 14–16 | 11–8 | 7th | |
| 1950–51 | Murray Greason | 16–14 | 8–9 | T–10th | |
| 1951–52 | Murray Greason | 10–19 | 7–9 | 10th | |
| 1952–53 | Murray Greason | 22–7 | 12–3 | T–2nd | NCAA Sweet Sixteen |
Murray Greason (Atlantic Coast Conference) (1953–1957)
| 1953–54 | Murray Greason | 17–12 | 8–4 | 3rd | |
| 1954–55 | Murray Greason | 17–10 | 8–6 | T–4th | |
| 1955–56 | Murray Greason | 19–9 | 10–4 | 3rd | |
| 1956–57 | Murray Greason | 19–9 | 7–7 | T–4th | |
| Murray Greason: | | 288–204 (.585) | 132–104 (.559) | | |
Bones McKinney (Atlantic Coast Conference) (1957–1965)
| 1957–58 | Bones McKinney | 6–17 | 3–11 | T–7th | |
| 1958–59 | Bones McKinney | 10–14 | 5–9 | T–6th | |
| 1959–60 | Bones McKinney | 21–7 | 12–2 | T–1st | |
| 1960–61 | Bones McKinney | 19–11 | 11–3 | 2nd | NCAA University Division Elite Eight |
| 1961–62 | Bones McKinney | 22–9 | 12–2 | 1st | NCAA University Division Final Four |
| 1962–63 | Bones McKinney | 16–10 | 11–3 | 2nd | |
| 1963–64 | Bones McKinney | 16–11 | 9–5 | 2nd | |
| 1964–65 | Bones McKinney | 12–15 | 6–8 | 5th | |
| Bones McKinney: | | 122–94 (.565) | 69–43 (.616) | | |
Jack Murdock (Atlantic Coast Conference) (1965–1966)
| 1965–66 | Jack Murdock | 8–18 | 4–10 | T–6th | |
Jack McCloskey (Atlantic Coast Conference) (1966–1972)
| 1966–67 | Jack McCloskey | 9–18 | 5–9 | T–5th | |
| 1967–68 | Jack McCloskey | 5–21 | 3–11 | T–7th | |
| 1968–69 | Jack McCloskey | 18–9 | 8–6 | T–3rd | |
| 1969–70 | Jack McCloskey | 14–13 | 6–8 | 5th | |
| 1970–71 | Jack McCloskey | 16–10 | 7–7 | 4th | |
| 1971–72 | Jack McCloskey | 8–18 | 3–9 | 6th | |
| Jack McCloskey: | | 70–89 (.440) | 32–50 (.390) | | |
Carl Tacy (Atlantic Coast Conference) (1972–1985)
| 1972–73 | Carl Tacy | 12–15 | 3–9 | 7th | |
| 1973–74 | Carl Tacy | 13–13 | 3–9 | 6th | |
| 1974–75 | Carl Tacy | 13–13 | 2–10 | T–6th | |
| 1975–76 | Carl Tacy | 17–10 | 5–7 | T–4th | |
| 1976–77 | Carl Tacy | 22–8 | 8–4 | T–2nd | NCAA Division I Elite Eight |
| 1977–78 | Carl Tacy | 19–10 | 6–6 | T–4th | |
| 1978–79 | Carl Tacy | 12–15 | 3–9 | T–6th | |
| 1979–80 | Carl Tacy | 13–14 | 4–10 | 7th | |
| 1980–81 | Carl Tacy | 22–7 | 9–5 | 3rd | NCAA Division I Second Round |
| 1981–82 | Carl Tacy | 21–9 | 9–5 | 3rd | NCAA Division I Second Round |
| 1982–83 | Carl Tacy | 20–12 | 7–7 | 5th | NIT Semifinal |
| 1983–84 | Carl Tacy | 23–9 | 7–7 | T–3rd | NCAA Division I Elite Eight |
| 1984–85 | Carl Tacy | 15–14 | 5–9 | T–6th | NIT First Round |
| Carl Tacy: | | 222–149 (.598) | 71–97 (.423) | | |
Bob Staak (Atlantic Coast Conference) (1985–1989)
| 1985–86 | Bob Staak | 8–21 | 0–14 | 8th | |
| 1986–87 | Bob Staak | 14–15 | 2–12 | 7th | |
| 1987–88 | Bob Staak | 10–18 | 3–11 | 8th | |
| 1988–89 | Bob Staak | 13–15 | 3–11 | 7th | |
| Bob Staak: | | 45–69 (.395) | 8–48 (.143) | | |
Dave Odom (Atlantic Coast Conference) (1989–2001)
| 1989–90 | Dave Odom | 12–16 | 3–11 | 8th | |
| 1990–91 | Dave Odom | 19–11 | 8–6 | T–3rd | NCAA Division I Second Round |
| 1991–92 | Dave Odom | 17–12 | 7–9 | 6th | NCAA Division I First Round |
| 1992–93 | Dave Odom | 21–9 | 10–6 | T–3rd | NCAA Division I Sweet Sixteen |
| 1993–94 | Dave Odom | 21–12 | 9–7 | 3rd | NCAA Division I Second Round |
| 1994–95 | Dave Odom | 26–6 | 12–4 | 1st | NCAA Division I Sweet Sixteen |
| 1995–96 | Dave Odom | 26–6 | 12–4 | 2nd | NCAA Division I Elite Eight |
| 1996–97 | Dave Odom | 24–7 | 11–5 | T–2nd | NCAA Division I Second Round |
| 1997–98 | Dave Odom | 16–14 | 7–9 | T–4th | NIT Second Round |
| 1998–99 | Dave Odom | 17–14 | 7–9 | 4th | NIT Second Round |
| 1999–00 | Dave Odom | 22–14 | 7–9 | 5th | NIT Champion |
| 2000–01 | Dave Odom | 19–11 | 8–8 | T–5th | NCAA Division I First Round |
| Dave Odom: | | 240–132 (.645) | 101–87 (.537) | | |
Skip Prosser (Atlantic Coast Conference) (2001–2007)
| 2001–02 | Skip Prosser | 21–13 | 9–7 | T–3rd | NCAA Division I Second Round |
| 2002–03 | Skip Prosser | 25–6 | 13–3 | 1st | NCAA Division I Second Round |
| 2003–04 | Skip Prosser | 21–10 | 9–7 | T–3rd | NCAA Division I Sweet Sixteen |
| 2004–05 | Skip Prosser | 27–6 | 13–3 | 2nd | NCAA Division I Second Round |
| 2005–06 | Skip Prosser | 17–17 | 3–13 | 12th | NIT First Round |
| 2006–07 | Skip Prosser | 15–16 | 5–11 | T–10th | |
| Skip Prosser: | | 126–68 (.649) | 52–44 (.542) | | |
Dino Gaudio (Atlantic Coast Conference) (2007–2010)
| 2007–08 | Dino Gaudio | 17–13 | 7–9 | T–7th | |
| 2008–09 | Dino Gaudio | 24–7 | 11–5 | T–2nd | NCAA Division I First Round |
| 2009–10 | Dino Gaudio | 20–11 | 9–7 | T–5th | NCAA Division I Second Round |
| Dino Gaudio: | | 61–31 (.663) | 27–21 (.563) | | |
Jeff Bzdelik (Atlantic Coast Conference) (2010–2014)
| 2010–11 | Jeff Bzdelik | 8–24 | 1–15 | 12th | |
| 2011–12 | Jeff Bzdelik | 13–18 | 4–12 | T–12th | |
| 2012–13 | Jeff Bzdelik | 13–18 | 6–12 | T–9th | |
| 2013–14 | Jeff Bzdelik | 17–16 | 6–12 | T–11th | |
| Jeff Bzdelik: | | 51–76 (.402) | 17–51 (.250) | | |
Danny Manning (Atlantic Coast Conference) (2014–2020)
| 2014–15 | Danny Manning | 13–19 | 5–13 | 12th | |
| 2015–16 | Danny Manning | 11–20 | 2–16 | 14th | |
| 2016–17 | Danny Manning | 19–14 | 9–9 | 10th | NCAA Division I First Four |
| 2017–18 | Danny Manning | 11–20 | 4–14 | 14th | |
| 2018–19 | Danny Manning | 11–20 | 4–14 | 13th | |
| 2019–20 | Danny Manning | 13–18 | 6–14 | T–12th | No postseason held |
| Danny Manning: | | 78–111 (.413) | 30–80 (.273) | | |
Steve Forbes (Atlantic Coast Conference) (2020–present)
| 2020–21 | Steve Forbes | 6–16 | 3–15 | 14th | |
| 2021–22 | Steve Forbes | 25–10 | 13–7 | 5th | NIT Quarterfinals |
| 2022–23 | Steve Forbes | 19–14 | 10–10 | T–8th | |
| 2023–24 | Steve Forbes | 21–14 | 11–9 | T–5th | NIT Second Round |
| 2024–25 | Steve Forbes | 21–11 | 13–7 | T–4th | |
| 2025–26 | Steve Forbes | 18–17 | 7–11 | 13th | NIT Second Round |
| Steve Forbes: | | 110–82 (.573) | 57–59 (.491) | | |
| Total: | | 1,661–1,338 | | | |
National champion Postseason invitational champion Conference regular season champion Conference regular season and conference tournament champion Division regular season champion Division regular season and conference tournament champion Conference tournament champion
