= List of George Washington Revolutionaries men's basketball head coaches =

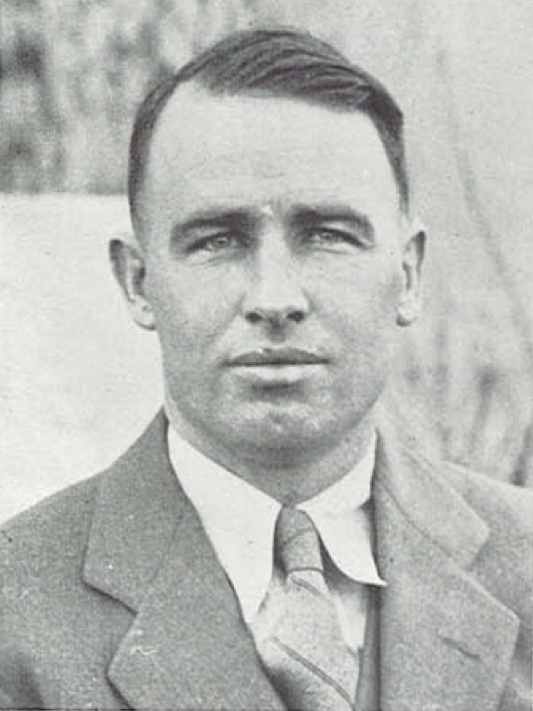
Bill Reinhart, the winningest head coach in Colonials men's basketball history.

The following is a list of George Washington Colonials men's basketball head coaches. There have been 29 head coaches of the Colonials in their 109-season history.

George Washington's current head coach is Chris Caputo. He was hired as the Colonials', now Revolutionaries head coach in April 2022, replacing Jamion Christian, who was fired after the 2021–22 season.

No.	Tenure	Coach	Years	Record	Pct.
1	1906–1908	J. Kramer	2	7–12	.368
2	1912–1914	Slitz Schlosser	2	4–16	.200
3	1914–1915	Nathan Dougherty	1	5–9	.357
4	1915–1917	George Colliflower	2	9–19	.321
5	1917–1918	Bertram Groesbeck and Murphy	1	5–6	.455
6	1920–1923	Bryan Morse	3	16–27	.372
7	1923–1925	Jack Dailey	2	8–14	.364
8	1925–1927	James Lemon	2	13–16	.448
9	1927–1929	Harry W. Crum	2	13–14	.481
10	1929–1930	Joe Mitchell	1	9–7	.563
11	1930–1932; 1934–1935 (Note: Pixlee and Wilson served as co-head coaches for the 1934–35 season. The team finished 14–6; both coaches are credited with wins and losses from this season.)	Jim Pixlee	2	36–15	.706
12	1932–1934	Ted O'Leary	2	26–9	.743
13	1934–1935	Logan Wilson	1	14–6	.700
14	1935–1942; 1949–1966	Bill Reinhart	24	319–237	.574
15	1942–1947 (Note: George Washington did not field a team for the 1943–44 or 1944–45 seasons.)	Otis Zahn	3	45–21	.682
16	1947–1949	George Garber	2	37–15	.712
17	1966–1967	Babe McCarthy	1	6–18	.250
18	1967–1970	Wayne Dobbs	3	31–45	.408
19	1970–1974	Carl Slone	4	54–48	.529
20	1974–1981	Bob Tallent	7	102–84	.548
21	1981–1985	Gerry Gimelstob	4	58–55	.513
22	1985–1990	John Kuester	5	50–94	.347
23	1990–1998	Mike Jarvis	8	152–90	.628
24	1998–2001	Tom Penders	3	49–42	.538
25	2001–2011	Karl Hobbs	10	133–100	.571
26	2011–2016	Mike Lonergan	5	97–70	.581
27	2016–2019	Maurice Joseph	3	44–57	.436
28	2019–2022	Jamion Christian	3	29–50	.367
29	2022–present	Chris Caputo	3	52–46	.531
Totals		29 coaches	112 seasons	1,409–1,236	.533
Records updated through end of 2024–25 season Source
