= 1920 VPI Gobblers football team =

American college football season

1920 VPI Gobblers football
- Conference: South Atlantic Intercollegiate Athletic Association
- Record: 4–6 (2–4 SAIAA)
- Head coach: Stanley Sutton (1st season)
- Captains: George Frizzell Parrish; Henry Redd
- Home stadium: Miles Field

1920 South Atlantic Intercollegiate Athletic Association football standings
	Conf.					Overall
Team	W		L		T	W		L		T
VMI $	5	–	0	–	0	9	–	0	–	0
Maryland	4	–	0	–	0	7	–	2	–	0
Washington and Lee	3	–	0	–	0	5	–	3	–	0
Georgetown	3	–	1	–	0	6	–	4	–	0
Virginia	3	–	1	–	0	5	–	2	–	2
NC State	4	–	2	–	0	7	–	3	–	0
Richmond	2	–	2	–	0	6	–	2	–	0
Davidson	2	–	2	–	0	5	–	5	–	0
VPI	2	–	4	–	0	4	–	6	–	0
Catholic University	1	–	3	–	0	3	–	5	–	0
George Washington	0	–	1	–	0	1	–	6	–	1
St. John's (MD)	0	–	1	–	0	0	–	1	–	0
Johns Hopkins	0	–	2	–	0	0	–	3	–	0
William & Mary	0	–	4	–	0	4	–	5	–	0
North Carolina	0	–	5	–	0	2	–	6	–	0
$ – Conference champion

The 1920 VPI Gobblers football team represented Virginia Polytechnic Institute in the 1920 college football season. The team was led by their head coach Stanley Sutton and finished with a record of four wins and six losses (4–6).

== Schedule ==
Date	Time	Opponent	Site	Result	Attendance	Source
September 25		Hampden–Sydney*	Miles Field; Blacksburg, VA	W 35–0		
October 2		William & Mary	Miles Field; Blacksburg, VA	W 21–0		
October 9		Emory and Henry*	Miles Field; Blacksburg, VA	W 75–6		
October 16	3:00 p.m.	at Rutgers*	Neilson Field; Piscataway, NJ	L 6–19	5,000	
October 23		Maryland	Miles Field; Blacksburg, VA	L 0–7		
October 30		vs. Washington and Lee	Lynchburg, VA	L 0–13	5,000-7,000	
November 6	3:00 p.m.	at Richmond	Boulevard Park; Richmond, VA	W 21–0	3,000	
November 11	3:00 p.m.	vs. NC State	League Park; Norfolk, VA	L 6–14	5,000	
November 20		vs. Centre*	Eclipse Park; Louisville, KY	L 0–28	8,000	
November 25	2:30 p.m.	vs. VMI	Fair Grounds; Roanoke, VA (rivalry)	L 7–24	15,000–20,000	
*Non-conference game; All times are in Eastern time

== Before the season ==
The 1919 VPI Gobblers football team compiled a 5–4 record and were led by Charles A. Bernier in his third season as head coach.

The week before their first game of the season, VPI's captain and star fullback Henry Redd broke his arm.

== Game summaries ==
=== Hampden–Sydney ===
VPI's first game of the season was a victory over Hampden–Sydney at Miles Field.

=== William & Mary ===
William & Mary at VPI

Team	1	2	3	4	Total
W&M	0	0	0	0	0
• VPI	0	0	7	14	21

- Date: October 2
- Location: Miles Field
  Blacksburg, VA
- Referee: Ernest Sampson (St. Albans)

After their victory over Hampden–Sydney, VPI played the College of William & Mary at Miles Field.

The starting lineup for VPI was: Parrish (left end), T. Tilson (left tackle), Resh (left guard), Hardwick (center), Saunders (right guard), Effinger (right tackle), Washington (right end), Lybrook (quarterback), Martin (left halfback), Sutton (right halfback), Shaner (fullback). The substitutes were: Carpenter, Eldridge, Hutchinson, Jones, Moore, Newman, Rice, Shaeffer, Sheppard, Sherertz and Wallace.

The starting lineup for William & Mary was: Shepherd (left end), Close (left tackle), Ferdinand Chandler (left guard), Walter Garber (center), John Bentley (right guard), W. S. Harwood (right tackle), S. B. Badgett (right end), Bake Jones (quarterback), Harvey Hastings (left halfback), Monk White (right halfback), Thomas Jordan (fullback). The substitutes were: Bridges, Earnest Dietz and W. A. Sinton.

=== Emory and Henry ===
The starting lineup for VPI was: Parrish (left end), Effinger (left tackle), T. Tilson (left guard), Hardwick (center), Saunders (right guard), Crisp (right tackle), Wilson (right end), Lybrook (quarterback), Martin (left halfback), Sutton (right halfback), Wallace (fullback). The substitutes were: Givens, Newman, Shaeffer, Shaner and Sherertz.

The starting lineup for Emory and Henry was: Ellis (left end), Dickenson (left tackle), Ball (left guard), Anderson (center), McClung (right guard), Weaver (right tackle), Wolfe (right end), Harmeling (quarterback), Caldwell (left halfback), Perry (right halfback), White (fullback).

=== Rutgers ===
VPI at Rutgers

Team	1	2	3	4	Total
VPI	0	0	0	6	6
• RU	9	0	7	3	19

- Date: October 16
- Location: Neilson Field
  Piscataway, NJ
- Game start: 3:00 p.m.
- Game attendance: 5,000
- Referee: Charles Hann (Harvard)

The starting lineup for VPI was: Parrish (left end), T. Tilson (left tackle), Resh (left guard), Hardwick (center), Effinger (right guard), Crisp (right tackle), Washington (right end), Lybrook (quarterback), Martin (left halfback), Sutton (right halfback), Wallace (fullback). The substitutes were: Jones, Moore, Rice, Shaeffer, Sheppard, Sherertz and Wilson.

The starting lineup for Rutgers was: John Winner (left end), Brook Daisley (left tackle), John Scudder (left guard), Richard Dunham (center), Lawrence Sliker (right guard), William Kingman (right tackle), Herbert Redmond (right end), Francis Maloney (quarterback), William Gardner (left halfback), John Summerhil (right halfback), Garett Voorhees (fullback). The substitutes were: Harold Augustine, Joseph Eckhardt, A. Hilliard, Cornell Kahle, Lentz and Mortimer Redmond.

=== Maryland ===
Maryland at VPI

Team	1	2	3	4	Total
• Maryland	0	0	0	7	7
VPI	0	0	0	0	0

- Date: October 23
- Location: Miles Field
  Blacksburg, VA
- Referee: Jack Gass

The starting lineup for VPI was: Parrish (left end), T. Tilson (left tackle), Effinger (left guard), Hardwick (center), Sherertz (right guard), Crisp (right tackle), Carpenter (right end), Lybrook (quarterback), Sutton (left halfback), Shaeffer (right halfback), W. Tilson (fullback). The substitutes were: Eldridge, Jones, Moore, Rice, Washington and Wilson.

The starting lineup for Maryland was: Geary Eppley (left end), Andy Nisbet (left tackle), John Moore (left guard), Caleb Bailey (center), Jerry Sullivan (right guard), Morrison Clark (right tackle), Cecil Branner (right end), Eddie Semler (quarterback), Herbert Gilbert (left halfback), Alexander McDonald (right halfback), Roy Mackert (fullback). The substitutes were: Lester Bosley, John Groves, Dutch Plassing and Smith.

=== Washington and Lee ===
Washington & Lee vs. VPI

Team	1	2	3	4	Total
• W&L	0	6	7	0	13
VPI	0	0	0	0	0

- Date: October 30
- Location: Lynchburg, VA
- Game attendance: 5,000-7,000
- Referee: Jack Gass

The starting lineup for VPI was: Parrish (left end), T. Tilson (left tackle), Resh (left guard), Hardwick (center), Sherertz (right guard), Crisp (right tackle), Carpenter (right end), Lybrook (quarterback), Sutton (left halfback), Shaeffer (right halfback), Martin (fullback). The substitutes were: Rutherford, Saunders, Wallace, Washington and Wilson.

The starting lineup for Washington and Lee was: Bernard Arbogast (left end), Lindsay Moore (left tackle), John Patterson (left guard), F. M. Paget (center), Beverley Barrow (right guard), Richard Sanford (right tackle), Joseph Herndon (right end), Marcus Cogbill (quarterback), D. M. Tucker (left halfback), Marv Mattox (right halfback), Joseph Silverstein (fullback). The substitutes were: Robert Frew and Homer Henderson.

=== Richmond ===
VPI at Richmond

Team	1	2	3	4	Total
• VPI	14	0	7	0	21
RU	0	0	0	0	0

- Date: November 6
- Location: Boulevard Park
  Richmond, VA
- Game start: 3:00 p.m
- Game attendance: 3,000
- Referee: Robert Kent Gooch

The starting lineup for VPI was: Parrish (left end), T. Tilson (left tackle), Resh (left guard), Hardwick (center), Sherertz (right guard), Crisp (right tackle), Carpenter (right end), Lybrook (quarterback), Sutton (left halfback), Wallace (right halfback), Martin (fullback). The substitutes were: Jones, Saunders, Shaeffer and Wilson.

The starting lineup for Richmond was: W. Richard Broaddus (left end), Harry Carter (left tackle), Albert Klevesahl (left guard), Edward Willingham (center), Robert Price (right guard), Randolph Nuckols (right tackle), Hubel Robins (right end), Waverly Jones (quarterback), E. Hobson Snead (left halfback), William Ziegler (right halfback), Wilkins (fullback). The substitutes were: Ralph Bethel, Russell Booker, Cutchins, Wilbur Mahaney, Howard Spencer and Thurman Towill.

=== NC State ===
NC State vs. VPI

Team	1	2	3	4	Total
• NCSU	0	7	0	7	14
VPI	0	0	6	0	6

- Date: November 11
- Location: Norfolk, VA
- Game attendance: 5,000
- Referee: Jack Gass

The starting lineup for VPI was: Parrish (left end), T. Tilson (left tackle), Resh (left guard), Hardwick (center), Sherertz (right guard), Crisp (right tackle), Carpenter (right end), Lybrook (quarterback), Sutton (left halfback), Wallace (right halfback), Martin (fullback). The substitutes were: Saunders, Shaeffer, Sheppard and Wilson.

The starting lineup for NC State was: William Wearn (left end), Herbert Weathers (left tackle), Averette Floyd (left guard), Arvle Everhart (center), George Murray (right guard), John Ripple (right tackle), Charles Kirkpatrick (right end), J. T. Faucette (quarterback), W. I. Johnson (left halfback), Dick Gurley (right halfback), Nathaniel Pierson (fullback). The substitutes were: Joel Lawrence.

=== Centre ===
Centre vs. VPI

Team	1	2	3	4	Total
VPI	0	0	0	0	0
• Centre	0	14	14	0	28

- Date: November 20
- Location: Eclipse Park
  Louisville, KY
- Game attendance: 8,000
- Referee: John J. Tigert

The starting lineup for VPI was: Parrish (left end), T. Tilson (left tackle), Resh (left guard), Hardwick (center), Sherertz (right guard), Crisp (right tackle), Carpenter (right end), Lybrook (quarterback), Sutton (left halfback), Wallace (right halfback), Martin (fullback). The substitutes were: Jones, Shaeffer and W. Tilson.

The starting lineup for Centre was: Terry Snoddy (left end), Bill James (left tackle), Clayton Ford (left guard), Red Weaver (center), Red Roberts (right guard), Sully Montgomery (right tackle), Jack Converse (right end), Bo McMillin (quarterback), Thomas Bartlett (left halfback), Norris Armstrong (right halfback), John Tanner (fullback). The substitutes were: Allen, W. E. Bedford, Ashby Blevins, Royce Flippin, Green, Harry Lipscomb, George Maver, McCall, Joseph Murphy, Carlton Rice, Stan Robb and Edwin Whitnell.

=== VMI ===
VMI vs. VPI

Team	1	2	3	4	Total
• VMI	0	7	7	10	24
VPI	7	0	0	0	7

- Date: November 25
- Location: Fair Grounds
  Roanoke, VA
- Game start: 2:30 p.m.
- Game attendance: 15,000–20,000
- Referee: Cosgrave (Army)

The starting lineup for VPI was: Parrish (left end), T. Tilson (left tackle), Resh (left guard), Hardwick (center), Saunders (right guard), Crisp (right tackle), Carpenter (right end), Wallace (quarterback), Sutton (left halfback), Shaeffer (right halfback), Sherertz (fullback). The substitutes were: Flory, Jones and Lybrook.

The starting lineup for VMI was: William Drewry (left end), Frank Summers (left tackle), William Harrison (left guard), John Smith (center), Howard Shipley (right guard), Robert Hunt (right tackle), Sam Mason (right end), Walker Stuart (quarterback), Jere Bunting (left halfback), Jimmy Leech (right halfback), William Wilson (fullback). The substitutes were: William Venable.

== Players ==
=== Roster ===
VPI 1920 roster
Dwight Carpenter; Hank Crisp; Bill Effinger; Cornelius Johnson Eldridge; Charles Laurence Flory; Givens; Harry Hardwick; John Dabney Hutchinson; Melvin Rivers Jones; Paul Guthrie Jones; Bill Lybrook; John Martin; Ralph Erskine Moore; Thomas F. Newman; George Parrish (Capt.)	Henry Redd (Capt.); Frank Resh; Guy Rice; Donald Hurt Rutherford; Robert Saunders; Sam Shaeffer; Wally Shaner; Hubert Anderson Sheppard; Bill Sherertz; Harry Sutton; Sumner "Tex" Tilson; William Ransom Tilson; John "Rip" Wallace; Washington; Wilson

=== Monogram Club members ===
Fifteen players received monograms for their participation on the 1920 VPI team.

Player	Hometown	Notes
Dwight Foster Carpenter	Richmond, Virginia	
Hank Crisp	Falkland, North Carolina	
Harry Judson Hardwick	Blacksburg, Virginia	The 22nd head football coach at the United States Naval Academy in Annapolis, Maryland.
William Murray Lybrook	Blacksburg, Virginia	
John A. Martin		
George Parrish (Capt.)	Bristol, Virginia	
Henry Redd (Capt.)	Martinsville, Virginia	Redd was awarded a monogram letter despite not playing in any games this season.
Franklyn Senator Resh	Norfolk, Virginia	
Guy Eldridge Rice	Appomattox, Virginia	
Robert M. Saunders	Blacksburg, Virginia	
Samuel Dennison Shaeffer		
William Shields Sherertz	Roanoke, Virginia	
Harry McMullen Sutton	Suffolk, Virginia	
Sumner Dewey "Tex" Tilson	Childress, Texas	VPI's head football coach for one season, in 1942, compiling a record of 7–2–1.
John Graham "Rip" Wallace	Hampton, Virginia	

== Coaching and training staff ==
- Head coach: Stanley Sutton
- Assistant coaches
  - William L. Younger
  - B. C. Cubbage
- Graduate Manager: Sally Miles
- Manager: Eppa Yeadon Wimbish, Jr.
