= 1920 West Virginia Mountaineers football team =

American college football season

1920 West Virginia Mountaineers football
- Conference: Independent
- Record: 5–4–1
- Head coach: Mont McIntire (4th season)
- Captain: Howard Lentz

1920 Southern college football independents records
	Conf.			Overall
Team	W	L	T	W		L		T
Talladega		–		?	–	0	–	0
Trinity (NC)		–		4	–	0	–	1
Abilene Christian		–		4	–	0	–	1
North Texas State Normal		–		7	–	1	–	0
Presbyterian		–		5	–	1	–	1
Middle Tennessee State Normal		–		4	–	1	–	0
Navy		–		6	–	2	–	0
Spring Hill		–		6	–	2	–	0
Birmingham–Southern		–		6	–	3	–	0
Mississippi Normal		–		4	–	2	–	1
Southwest Texas State		–		4	–	2	–	1
East Tennessee State Normal		–		3	–	2	–	0
West Virginia		–		5	–	4	–	1
Oglethorpe		–		4	–	4	–	1
Delaware		–		3	–	5	–	1
Stetson		–		2	–	4	–	0
Texas Mines		–		2	–	4	–	0
Marion		–		2	–	5	–	0
Wake Forest		–		2	–	7	–	0
Sam Houston Normal		–		1	–	4	–	2
Western Kentucky State Normal		–		0	–	1	–	0
West Tennessee State Normal		–		0	–	5	–	0
Marshall		–		0	–	8	–	0

The 1920 West Virginia Mountaineers football team was an American football team that represented West Virginia University as an independent during the 1920 college football season. In its fourth season under head coach Mont McIntire, the team compiled a 5–4–1 record and outscored opponents by a total of 169 to 113.

== Schedule ==
Date	Opponent	Site	Result	Attendance	Source
September 25	vs. West Virginia Wesleyan	South Side Park; Fairmont, WV	W 14–0	9,000	
October 2	Lehigh	Athletic Field; Morgantown, WV	T 7–7		
October 9	at Pittsburgh	Forbes Field; Pittsburgh, PA (rivalry)	L 13–34	22,000	
October 16	George Washington	Athletic Field; Morgantown, WV	W 81–0		
October 23	at Yale	Yale Bowl; New Haven, CT	L 0–24		
October 30	at Princeton	Palmer Stadium; Princeton, NJ	L 3–10	7,000	
November 6	vs. Washington and Lee	Laidley Field; Charleston, WV	W 14–10		
November 13	Rutgers	Athletic Field; Morgantown, WV	W 17–0	5,000	
November 20	Bethany (WV)	Athletic Field; Morgantown, WV	W 20–0		
November 25	at Washington & Jefferson	College Field; Washington, PA	L 0–28		
