= 1920 Spring Hill Badgers football team =

American college football season

1920 Spring Hill Badgers football
- Conference: Independent
- Record: 6–2
- Head coach: Moon Ducote (2nd season)
- Home stadium: Monroe Park

1920 Southern college football independents records
	Conf.			Overall
Team	W	L	T	W		L		T
Talladega		–		?	–	0	–	0
Trinity (NC)		–		4	–	0	–	1
Abilene Christian		–		4	–	0	–	1
North Texas State Normal		–		7	–	1	–	0
Presbyterian		–		5	–	1	–	1
Middle Tennessee State Normal		–		4	–	1	–	0
Navy		–		6	–	2	–	0
Spring Hill		–		6	–	2	–	0
Birmingham–Southern		–		6	–	3	–	0
Mississippi Normal		–		4	–	2	–	1
Southwest Texas State		–		4	–	2	–	1
East Tennessee State Normal		–		3	–	2	–	0
West Virginia		–		5	–	4	–	1
Oglethorpe		–		4	–	4	–	1
Delaware		–		3	–	5	–	1
Stetson		–		2	–	4	–	0
Texas Mines		–		2	–	4	–	0
Marion		–		2	–	5	–	0
Wake Forest		–		2	–	7	–	0
Sam Houston Normal		–		1	–	4	–	2
Western Kentucky State Normal		–		0	–	1	–	0
West Tennessee State Normal		–		0	–	5	–	0
Marshall		–		0	–	8	–	0

The 1920 Spring Hill Badgers football team represented the Spring Hill College as an independent during the 1920 college football season.

== Schedule ==
Date	Opponent	Site	Result	Source
October 2	Pensacola Naval Air Station	Monroe Park; Mobile, AL	W 37–0	
October 9	at LSU	State Field; Baton Rouge, LA	L 0–40	
October 16	Marion	Monroe Park; Mobile, AL	W 13–7	
October 29	at Birmingham–Southern	Rickwood Field; Birmingham, AL	L 13–20	
November 6	Millsaps	Monroe Park; Mobile, AL	W 62–0	
November 11	Southwestern Louisiana	Monroe Park; Mobile, AL	W 42–7	
November 21	at Jefferson College	Heinemann Park; New Orleans, LA	W 40–0	
November 25	Mississippi College	Monroe Park; Mobile, AL	W 21–20	
