= 1920 Middle Tennessee State Normal football team =

American college football season

1920 Middle Tennessee State Normal football
- Conference: Independent
- Record: 4–1
- Head coach: Alfred B. Miles (6th season)

1920 Southern college football independents records
	Conf.			Overall
Team	W	L	T	W		L		T
Talladega		–		?	–	0	–	0
Trinity (NC)		–		4	–	0	–	1
Abilene Christian		–		4	–	0	–	1
North Texas State Normal		–		7	–	1	–	0
Presbyterian		–		5	–	1	–	1
Middle Tennessee State Normal		–		4	–	1	–	0
Navy		–		6	–	2	–	0
Spring Hill		–		6	–	2	–	0
Birmingham–Southern		–		6	–	3	–	0
Mississippi Normal		–		4	–	2	–	1
Southwest Texas State		–		4	–	2	–	1
East Tennessee State Normal		–		3	–	2	–	0
West Virginia		–		5	–	4	–	1
Oglethorpe		–		4	–	4	–	1
Delaware		–		3	–	5	–	1
Stetson		–		2	–	4	–	0
Texas Mines		–		2	–	4	–	0
Marion		–		2	–	5	–	0
Wake Forest		–		2	–	7	–	0
Sam Houston Normal		–		1	–	4	–	2
Western Kentucky State Normal		–		0	–	1	–	0
West Tennessee State Normal		–		0	–	5	–	0
Marshall		–		0	–	8	–	0

The 1920 Middle Tennessee State Normal football team represented the Middle Tennessee State Normal School (now known as Middle Tennessee State University) during the 1920 college football season. The team finished the season with an overall record of 4–1.

== Schedule ==
Date	Opponent	Site	Result
	Bethel (KY)	Murfreesboro, TN	W 28–0
	Bethel (KY)	Murfreesboro, TN	W 44–0
October 30	at Maryville (TN)	Maryville, TN	W 40–14
	Vanderbilt	Murfreesboro, TN	L 0–34
	at Vanderbilt School of Medicine	Nashville, TN	W 21–6
