= 1920 Texas Mines Miners football team =

American college football season

1920 Texas Mines Miners football
- Conference: Independent
- Record: 2–4
- Head coach: Harry Van Surdam (1st season)

1920 Southern college football independents records
	Conf.			Overall
Team	W	L	T	W		L		T
Talladega		–		?	–	0	–	0
Trinity (NC)		–		4	–	0	–	1
Abilene Christian		–		4	–	0	–	1
North Texas State Normal		–		7	–	1	–	0
Presbyterian		–		5	–	1	–	1
Middle Tennessee State Normal		–		4	–	1	–	0
Navy		–		6	–	2	–	0
Spring Hill		–		6	–	2	–	0
Birmingham–Southern		–		6	–	3	–	0
Mississippi Normal		–		4	–	2	–	1
Southwest Texas State		–		4	–	2	–	1
East Tennessee State Normal		–		3	–	2	–	0
West Virginia		–		5	–	4	–	1
Oglethorpe		–		4	–	4	–	1
Delaware		–		3	–	5	–	1
Stetson		–		2	–	4	–	0
Texas Mines		–		2	–	4	–	0
Marion		–		2	–	5	–	0
Wake Forest		–		2	–	7	–	0
Sam Houston Normal		–		1	–	4	–	2
Western Kentucky State Normal		–		0	–	1	–	0
West Tennessee State Normal		–		0	–	5	–	0
Marshall		–		0	–	8	–	0

The 1920 Texas Mines Miners football team was an American football team that represented the Texas School of Mines (now known as the University of Texas at El Paso) as an independent during the 1920 college football season. The team was coached by Harry Van Surdam who was later inducted into the College Football Hall of Fame. The team compiled a 2–4 record and was outscored by a total of 191 to 48.

== Schedule ==
Date	Opponent	Site	Result	Source
October 30	Arizona	El Paso, TX	L 7–60	
November 6	at New Mexico	University field; Albuquerque, NM	L 0–78	
November 11	New Mexico A&M	El Paso High School Stadium; El Paso, TX (rivalry)	L 7–12	
November 19	at New Mexico Military	Roswell, NM	L 3–41	
November 25	Base Hospital, Fort Bliss	El Paso, TX	W 28–0	
November 30	Aviation Corps, Fort Bliss	El Paso, TX	W 3–0	
