= 1920 VMI Keydets football team =

American college football season

1920 VMI Keydets football
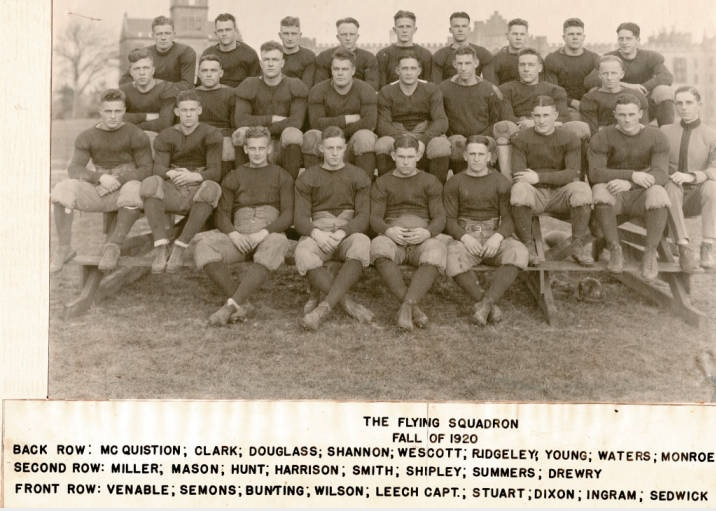

SAIAA champion
- Conference: South Atlantic Intercollegiate Athletic Association
- Record: 9–0 (5–0 SAIAA)
- Head coach: Blandy Clarkson (1st season)

1920 South Atlantic Intercollegiate Athletic Association football standings
	Conf.					Overall
Team	W		L		T	W		L		T
VMI $	5	–	0	–	0	9	–	0	–	0
Maryland	4	–	0	–	0	7	–	2	–	0
Washington and Lee	3	–	0	–	0	5	–	3	–	0
Georgetown	3	–	1	–	0	6	–	4	–	0
Virginia	3	–	1	–	0	5	–	2	–	2
NC State	4	–	2	–	0	7	–	3	–	0
Richmond	2	–	2	–	0	6	–	2	–	0
Davidson	2	–	2	–	0	5	–	5	–	0
VPI	2	–	4	–	0	4	–	6	–	0
Catholic University	1	–	3	–	0	3	–	5	–	0
George Washington	0	–	1	–	0	1	–	6	–	1
St. John's (MD)	0	–	1	–	0	0	–	1	–	0
Johns Hopkins	0	–	2	–	0	0	–	3	–	0
William & Mary	0	–	4	–	0	4	–	5	–	0
North Carolina	0	–	5	–	0	2	–	6	–	0
$ – Conference champion

The 1920 VMI Keydets football team represented the Virginia Military Institute (VMI) in their 30th season of organized football, during the 1920 college football season. Led by first-year head coach Blandy Clarkson, the Keydets went 9–0 and outscored opponents 431 to 20. College Football Hall of Fame inductee Jimmy Leech starred on the team, leading the nation in scoring with 210 points. Leech was selected third-team All-America by Walter Camp. The season included the first instance of the rivalry with The Citadel, which would later become known as the Military Classic of the South. The team was nicknamed "The Flying Squadron."

== Schedule ==
Date	Time	Opponent	Site	Result	Attendance	Source
September 25		Roanoke*	VMI Parade Ground; Lexington, VA	W 54–0		
October 2		Hampden–Sydney*	VMI Parade Ground; Lexington, VA	W 136–0		
October 9		at Virginia	Lambeth Field; Charlottesville, VA	W 22–6		
October 16		vs. The Citadel*	Fairgrounds; Lynchburg, VA (rivalry)	W 35–0		
October 23		at Penn*	Franklin Field; Philadelphia, PA	W 27–7	18,000	
October 30		NC State	VMI Parade Ground; Lexington, VA	W 14–0		
November 6		at North Carolina	Emerson Field; Chapel Hill, NC	W 23–0		
November 13		Catholic University	VMI Parade Ground; Lexington, VA	W 96–0		
November 25	2:30 p.m.	vs. VPI	Fair Grounds; Roanoke, VA (rivalry)	W 24–7	15,000–20,000	
*Non-conference game
