= 1920 Abilene Christian football team =

American college football season

1920 Abilene Christian football
- Conference: Independent
- Record: 4–0–1
- Head coach: Sewell Jones (1st season)
- Captain: Victor Payne

1920 Southern college football independents records
	Conf.			Overall
Team	W	L	T	W		L		T
Talladega		–		?	–	0	–	0
Trinity (NC)		–		4	–	0	–	1
Abilene Christian		–		4	–	0	–	1
North Texas State Normal		–		7	–	1	–	0
Presbyterian		–		5	–	1	–	1
Middle Tennessee State Normal		–		4	–	1	–	0
Navy		–		6	–	2	–	0
Spring Hill		–		6	–	2	–	0
Birmingham–Southern		–		6	–	3	–	0
Mississippi Normal		–		4	–	2	–	1
Southwest Texas State		–		4	–	2	–	1
East Tennessee State Normal		–		3	–	2	–	0
West Virginia		–		5	–	4	–	1
Oglethorpe		–		4	–	4	–	1
Delaware		–		3	–	5	–	1
Stetson		–		2	–	4	–	0
Texas Mines		–		2	–	4	–	0
Marion		–		2	–	5	–	0
Wake Forest		–		2	–	7	–	0
Sam Houston Normal		–		1	–	4	–	2
Western Kentucky State Normal		–		0	–	1	–	0
West Tennessee State Normal		–		0	–	5	–	0
Marshall		–		0	–	8	–	0

The 1920 Abilene Christian football team was an American football team that represented Abilene Christian College—now known as Abilene Christian University–as an independent during the 1920 college football season. Led by Sewell Jones in his first and only season as head coach, the team compiled a record of 4–0–1. Abilene Christian's 81–0 win over Daniel Baker is the biggest margin of victory and third most points scored in a single game in program history.

== Schedule ==
Date	Opponent	Site	Result
October 16	Clarendon	Abilene, TX	W 29–7
October 25	Tarleton Agricultural College	Abilene, TX	T 0–0
October 30	at Howard Payne	Brownwood, TX	W 7–3
November 18	at Tarleton Agricultural College	Stephenville, TX	W 13–0
November 25	Daniel Baker	Abilene, TX	W 81–0
