= 1920 Navy Midshipmen football team =

American college football season

1920 Navy Midshipmen football
- Conference: Independent
- Record: 6–2
- Head coach: Bob Folwell (1st season)
- Captain: Eddie Ewen
- Home stadium: Worden Field

1920 Southern college football independents records
	Conf.			Overall
Team	W	L	T	W		L		T
Talladega		–		?	–	0	–	0
Trinity (NC)		–		4	–	0	–	1
Abilene Christian		–		4	–	0	–	1
North Texas State Normal		–		7	–	1	–	0
Presbyterian		–		5	–	1	–	1
Middle Tennessee State Normal		–		4	–	1	–	0
Navy		–		6	–	2	–	0
Spring Hill		–		6	–	2	–	0
Birmingham–Southern		–		6	–	3	–	0
Mississippi Normal		–		4	–	2	–	1
Southwest Texas State		–		4	–	2	–	1
East Tennessee State Normal		–		3	–	2	–	0
West Virginia		–		5	–	4	–	1
Oglethorpe		–		4	–	4	–	1
Delaware		–		3	–	5	–	1
Stetson		–		2	–	4	–	0
Texas Mines		–		2	–	4	–	0
Marion		–		2	–	5	–	0
Wake Forest		–		2	–	7	–	0
Sam Houston Normal		–		1	–	4	–	2
Western Kentucky State Normal		–		0	–	1	–	0
West Tennessee State Normal		–		0	–	5	–	0
Marshall		–		0	–	8	–	0

The 1920 Navy Midshipmen football team represented the United States Naval Academy during the 1920 college football season. In their first season under head coach Bob Folwell, the Midshipmen compiled a 6–2 record, shut out three opponents, and outscored all opponents by a combined score of 164 to 43.

The annual Army–Navy Game was played on November 27 at the Polo Grounds in New York City; Navy won 7–0.

== Schedule ==
Date	Opponent	Site	Result	Source
October 2	NC State	Worden Field; Annapolis, MD	L 7–14	
October 9	Lafayette	Worden Field; Annapolis, MD	W 12–7	
October 16	Bucknell	Worden Field; Annapolis, MD	W 7–2	
October 23	at Princeton	Palmer Stadium; Princeton, NJ	L 0–14	
October 30	Western Reserve	Worden Field; Annapolis, MD	W 95–0	
November 6	Georgetown	Worden Field; Annapolis, MD	W 21–6	
November 13	South Carolina	Worden Field; Annapolis, MD	W 63–0	
November 27	vs. Army	Polo Grounds; New York, NY (Army–Navy Game)	W 7–0	
