= 1920 William & Mary Indians football team =

American college football season

1920 William & Mary Indians football
- Conference: South Atlantic Intercollegiate Athletic Association
- Record: 4–5 (0–4 SAIAA)
- Head coach: James G. Driver (2nd season)
- Captain: W. K. Close

1920 South Atlantic Intercollegiate Athletic Association football standings
	Conf.					Overall
Team	W		L		T	W		L		T
VMI $	5	–	0	–	0	9	–	0	–	0
Maryland	4	–	0	–	0	7	–	2	–	0
Washington and Lee	3	–	0	–	0	5	–	3	–	0
Georgetown	3	–	1	–	0	6	–	4	–	0
Virginia	3	–	1	–	0	5	–	2	–	2
NC State	4	–	2	–	0	7	–	3	–	0
Richmond	2	–	2	–	0	6	–	2	–	0
Davidson	2	–	2	–	0	5	–	5	–	0
VPI	2	–	4	–	0	4	–	6	–	0
Catholic University	1	–	3	–	0	3	–	5	–	0
George Washington	0	–	1	–	0	1	–	6	–	1
St. John's (MD)	0	–	1	–	0	0	–	1	–	0
Johns Hopkins	0	–	2	–	0	0	–	3	–	0
William & Mary	0	–	4	–	0	4	–	5	–	0
North Carolina	0	–	5	–	0	2	–	6	–	0
$ – Conference champion

The 1920 William & Mary Indians football team represented the College of William & Mary as a member of the South Atlantic Intercollegiate Athletic Association (SAIAA) during the 1920 college football season. Led by James G. Driver is his second and final season as head coach, the Indians compiled an overall record of 4–5 with a mark of 0–4 in conference play.

== Schedule ==
Date	Opponent	Site	Result	Source
September 25	at Virginia	Lambeth Field; Charlottesville, VA	L 0–27	
October 2	at VPI	Miles Field; Blacksburg, VA	L 0–21	
October 9	vs. Gallaudet*	Boulevard Field; Richmond, VA	W 14–7	
October 16	Lynchburg*	Williamsburg, VA	W 36–0	
October 23	Union Theological Seminary*	Williamsburg, VA	W 34–0	
October 30	vs. Richmond	League Park; Norfolk, VA (rivalry)	L 0–13	
November 6	at NC State	Riddick Stadium; Raleigh, NC	L 0–81	
November 20	vs. Randolph–Macon*	Boulevard Field; Richmond, VA	W 34–0	
November 25	vs. Hampden–Sydney*	Newport News, VA	L 7–14	
*Non-conference game
