= Stanley Sutton =

American football coach (1895–1967)

Biographical details
- Born: August 9, 1895; Wilmette, Illinois, U.S.
- Died: October 1967 (aged 72); Newtown, Pennsylvania, U.S.
- Education: Springfield College

Coaching career (HC unless noted)
- 1920: VPI

Head coaching record
- Overall: 4–6

Stanley Bigsby Sutton (August 9, 1895 – October 1967) was an American football coach. He served as the head football coach at Virginia Agricultural and Mechanical College and Polytechnic Institute (VPI)—now known as Virginia Tech—for one season on 1920, compiling a record of 4–6.

== Head coaching record ==
Year	Team	Overall	Conference	Standing	Bowl/playoffs
VPI Gobblers (South Atlantic Intercollegiate Athletic Association) (1920)
1920	VPI	4–6	2–4	9th	
VPI:		4–6	2–4		
Total:		4–6			
