= B. B. O'Mara =

American football player and sports coach (1896–1969)

Biographical details
- Born: September 15, 1896
- Died: May 24, 1969 (aged 72)
- Education: Mississippi (M.D. 1922)

Playing career

Football
- 1918–1919: Ole Miss
- 1920: Mississippi Normal
- 1921: Ole Miss

Coaching career (HC unless noted)

Football
- 1920: Mississippi Normal

Basketball
- 1920–1921: Mississippi Normal

Head coaching record
- Overall: 4–2–1 (football); 2–2 (basketball)

Braxton Bragg "Opp" O'Mara (September 15, 1896 – May 24, 1969) was an American college football player and coach of college football and college basketball. He served as a football player-coach for one season at the University of Southern Mississippi–then known as Mississippi Normal College–in 1920, compiling a record of 4–2–1. His stint as a player at Hattiesburg was sandwiched between two stints as a player at the University of Mississippi (1918–1919, 1921). O'Mara graduated from the University of Mississippi School of Medicine in 1922.

== Head coaching record ==
=== Football ===
Year	Team	Overall	Conference	Standing	Bowl/playoffs
Mississippi Normal Normalites (Independent) (1920)
1920	Mississippi Normal	4–2–1			
Mississippi Normal:		4–2–1			
Total:		4–2–1			
