= 1920 East Tennessee State Normal football team =

American college football season

1920 East Tennessee State Normal football
- Conference: Independent
- Record: 0–2 (3–2 with non-countable games)
- Head coach: William R. Windes (1st season)

1920 Southern college football independents records
	Conf.			Overall
Team	W	L	T	W		L		T
Talladega		–		?	–	0	–	0
Trinity (NC)		–		4	–	0	–	1
Abilene Christian		–		4	–	0	–	1
North Texas State Normal		–		7	–	1	–	0
Presbyterian		–		5	–	1	–	1
Middle Tennessee State Normal		–		4	–	1	–	0
Navy		–		6	–	2	–	0
Spring Hill		–		6	–	2	–	0
Birmingham–Southern		–		6	–	3	–	0
Mississippi Normal		–		4	–	2	–	1
Southwest Texas State		–		4	–	2	–	1
East Tennessee State Normal		–		3	–	2	–	0
West Virginia		–		5	–	4	–	1
Oglethorpe		–		4	–	4	–	1
Delaware		–		3	–	5	–	1
Stetson		–		2	–	4	–	0
Texas Mines		–		2	–	4	–	0
Marion		–		2	–	5	–	0
Wake Forest		–		2	–	7	–	0
Sam Houston Normal		–		1	–	4	–	2
Western Kentucky State Normal		–		0	–	1	–	0
West Tennessee State Normal		–		0	–	5	–	0
Marshall		–		0	–	8	–	0

The 1920 East Tennessee State Normal School football team was an American football team that represented East Tennessee State Normal School—now known as East Tennessee State University (ETSU)—as an independent in the 1920 college football season. It was very first season that the school fielded a football team. The team was coached by William R. Windes, a 1917 graduate of the University of Tennessee who taught agriculture and biology at the school. He was assisted by English professor Willis Beeler "Bull" Bible, brother of Dana X. Bible, and by fellow teacher A. V. McFee. The first team for East Tennessee State consisted of 11 first-string players and 4 substitutes. There is dispute on the final record for this season, however ETSU officially credits the 1920 team with a 0–2 record (with three non-countable wins). The schedule was mix of regional colleges and high schools and started the rivalry against Milligan College. Initially, the school began to consider football as early as 1915, but could not find field a team until 1920 due to funding and finding enough men to play for the team. In 1920, the East Tennessee State Normal School team did not go by one nickname, but rather several nicknames including the "Normalites", "Wolves", or "Huskies".

== Schedule ==
Date	Opponent	Site	Result	Source
November 13	at Carson–Newman	Jefferson City, TN	L 0–55	
	Milligan		L 0–30	
	Greeneville High School		W	
	Washington College		W	
	Johnson City High School		W	
