= 1920 Richmond Spiders football team =

American college football season

1920 Richmond Spiders football
- Conference: South Atlantic Intercollegiate Athletic Association
- Record: 6–2 (2–2 SAIAA)
- Head coach: Frank Dobson (7th season)
- Captain: W. R. Broadus
- Home stadium: Boulevard Field

1920 South Atlantic Intercollegiate Athletic Association football standings
	Conf.					Overall
Team	W		L		T	W		L		T
VMI $	5	–	0	–	0	9	–	0	–	0
Maryland	4	–	0	–	0	7	–	2	–	0
Washington and Lee	3	–	0	–	0	5	–	3	–	0
Georgetown	3	–	1	–	0	6	–	4	–	0
Virginia	3	–	1	–	0	5	–	2	–	2
NC State	4	–	2	–	0	7	–	3	–	0
Richmond	2	–	2	–	0	6	–	2	–	0
Davidson	2	–	2	–	0	5	–	5	–	0
VPI	2	–	4	–	0	4	–	6	–	0
Catholic University	1	–	3	–	0	3	–	5	–	0
George Washington	0	–	1	–	0	1	–	6	–	1
St. John's (MD)	0	–	1	–	0	0	–	1	–	0
Johns Hopkins	0	–	2	–	0	0	–	3	–	0
William & Mary	0	–	4	–	0	4	–	5	–	0
North Carolina	0	–	5	–	0	2	–	6	–	0
$ – Conference champion

The 1920 Richmond Spiders football team was an American football team that represented the University of Richmond as a member of the South Atlantic Intercollegiate Athletic Association (SAIAA) during the 1920 college football season. Led by seventh-year head coach, Frank Dobson, Richmond compiled an overall record of 6–2 with a mark of 2–2 in conference play. Next season's schedule was expected to be its "heaviest."

== Schedule ==
Date	Opponent	Site	Result	Source
October 2	Lynchburg*	Boulevard Field; Richmond, VA	W 27–0	
October 9	at Catholic University	Killion Field; Washington, DC	W 10–7	
October 16	Hampden–Sydney*	Boulevard Field; Richmond, VA	W 28–0	
October 23	Davidson	Boulevard Field; Richmond, VA	L 0–7	
October 30	vs. William & Mary	League Park; Norfolk, VA (rivalry)	W 13–0	
November 6	VPI	Boulevard Field; Richmond, VA	L 0–21	
November 13	Wake Forest*	Boulevard Field; Richmond, VA	W 20–7	
November 25	Randolph–Macon*	Boulevard Field; Richmond, VA	W 62–7	
*Non-conference game
