= 1920 George Washington Hatchetites football team =

American college football season

1920 George Washington Hatchetites football
- Conference: South Atlantic Intercollegiate Athletic Association
- Record: 1–6–1 (0–1 SAIAA)
- Head coach: Bryan Morse (1st season)
- Home stadium: American League Park

1920 South Atlantic Intercollegiate Athletic Association football standings
	Conf.					Overall
Team	W		L		T	W		L		T
VMI $	5	–	0	–	0	9	–	0	–	0
Maryland	4	–	0	–	0	7	–	2	–	0
Washington and Lee	3	–	0	–	0	5	–	3	–	0
Georgetown	3	–	1	–	0	6	–	4	–	0
Virginia	3	–	1	–	0	5	–	2	–	2
NC State	4	–	2	–	0	7	–	3	–	0
Richmond	2	–	2	–	0	6	–	2	–	0
Davidson	2	–	2	–	0	5	–	5	–	0
VPI	2	–	4	–	0	4	–	6	–	0
Catholic University	1	–	3	–	0	3	–	5	–	0
George Washington	0	–	1	–	0	1	–	6	–	1
St. John's (MD)	0	–	1	–	0	0	–	1	–	0
Johns Hopkins	0	–	2	–	0	0	–	3	–	0
William & Mary	0	–	4	–	0	4	–	5	–	0
North Carolina	0	–	5	–	0	2	–	6	–	0
$ – Conference champion

The 1920 George Washington Hatchetites Colonials football team was an American football team that represented George Washington University as a member of the South Atlantic Intercollegiate Athletic Association during the 1920 college football season. In their first season under head coach Bryan Morse, the team compiled a 1–6–1 record.

== Schedule ==
Date	Opponent	Site	Result	Source
October 2	Western Maryland*	Washington, DC	T 7–7	
October 9	Delaware*	Gallaudet College Field; Washington, DC	L 7–14	
October 16	at West Virginia*	Morgantown, WV	L 0–81	
October 23	Villanova*	American League Park; Washington, DC	W 13–7	
October 30	Bethany (WV)*	American League Park; Washington, DC	L 3–27	
November 6	at West Virginia Wesleyan*	Buckhannon, WV	L 7–101	
November 13	at Fordham*	Fordham Field; Bronx, NY	L 0–40	
November 25	Catholic University	Central High School Stadium; Washington, DC	L 0–13	
*Non-conference game
