= 1920 Presbyterian Blue Hose football team =

American college football season

1920 Presbyterian Blue Hose football
- Conference: Independent
- Record: 5–1–1
- Head coach: Walter A. Johnson (5th season)
- Captain: Lonnie McMillian

1920 Southern college football independents records
	Conf.			Overall
Team	W	L	T	W		L		T
Talladega		–		?	–	0	–	0
Trinity (NC)		–		4	–	0	–	1
Abilene Christian		–		4	–	0	–	1
North Texas State Normal		–		7	–	1	–	0
Presbyterian		–		5	–	1	–	1
Middle Tennessee State Normal		–		4	–	1	–	0
Navy		–		6	–	2	–	0
Spring Hill		–		6	–	2	–	0
Birmingham–Southern		–		6	–	3	–	0
Mississippi Normal		–		4	–	2	–	1
Southwest Texas State		–		4	–	2	–	1
East Tennessee State Normal		–		3	–	2	–	0
West Virginia		–		5	–	4	–	1
Oglethorpe		–		4	–	4	–	1
Delaware		–		3	–	5	–	1
Stetson		–		2	–	4	–	0
Texas Mines		–		2	–	4	–	0
Marion		–		2	–	5	–	0
Wake Forest		–		2	–	7	–	0
Sam Houston Normal		–		1	–	4	–	2
Western Kentucky State Normal		–		0	–	1	–	0
West Tennessee State Normal		–		0	–	5	–	0
Marshall		–		0	–	8	–	0

The 1920 Presbyterian Blue Hose football team represented Presbyterian College as an independent during the 1920 college football season. Led by the fifth-year head coach Walter A. Johnson, Presbyterian compiled a record of 5–1–1. The team captain was Lonnie McMillian.

== Schedule ==
Date	Opponent	Site	Result	Source
October 1	at Clemson	Riggs Field; Clemson, SC	T 7–7	
October 16	vs. North Georgia	Dahlonega, GA	W 34–7	
October 21	vs. South Carolina	Fairgrounds; Augusta, GA	L 0–14	
October 30	at Erskine	Greenwood, SC	W 14–0	
November 6	at Wofford	Spartanburg, SC	W 14–0	
November 13	Newberry	Clinton, SC	W 27–0	
November 20	Davidson	Clinton, SC	W 7–0	
