= 1920 Georgetown Blue and Gray football team =

American college football season

1920 Georgetown Blue and Gray football
- Conference: South Atlantic Intercollegiate Athletic Association
- Record: 6–4 (3–1 SAIAA)
- Head coach: Albert Exendine (7th season)
- Captain: Bill Dudack
- Home stadium: American League Park

1920 South Atlantic Intercollegiate Athletic Association football standings
| | Conf. | | | | | Overall |
| Team | W | | L | | T | W | | L | | T |
|---|---|---|---|---|---|---|---|---|---|---|
| VMI $ | 5 | – | 0 | – | 0 | 9 | – | 0 | – | 0 |
| Maryland | 4 | – | 0 | – | 0 | 7 | – | 2 | – | 0 |
| Washington and Lee | 3 | – | 0 | – | 0 | 5 | – | 3 | – | 0 |
| Georgetown | 3 | – | 1 | – | 0 | 6 | – | 4 | – | 0 |
| Virginia | 3 | – | 1 | – | 0 | 5 | – | 2 | – | 2 |
| NC State | 4 | – | 2 | – | 0 | 7 | – | 3 | – | 0 |
| Richmond | 2 | – | 2 | – | 0 | 6 | – | 2 | – | 0 |
| Davidson | 2 | – | 2 | – | 0 | 5 | – | 5 | – | 0 |
| VPI | 2 | – | 4 | – | 0 | 4 | – | 6 | – | 0 |
| Catholic University | 1 | – | 3 | – | 0 | 3 | – | 5 | – | 0 |
| George Washington | 0 | – | 1 | – | 0 | 1 | – | 6 | – | 1 |
| St. John's (MD) | 0 | – | 1 | – | 0 | 0 | – | 1 | – | 0 |
| Johns Hopkins | 0 | – | 2 | – | 0 | 0 | – | 3 | – | 0 |
| William & Mary | 0 | – | 4 | – | 0 | 4 | – | 5 | – | 0 |
| North Carolina | 0 | – | 5 | – | 0 | 2 | – | 6 | – | 0 |
$ – Conference champion

The 1920 Georgetown Blue and Gray football team was an American football team represented Georgetown University in the South Atlantic Intercollegiate Athletic Association (SAIAA) during the 1920 college football season. In its seventh season under head coach Albert Exendine, the team compiled a 6–4 record. Georgetown played their home games at American League Park in Washington, D.C..

== Schedule ==
| Date | Opponent | Site | Result | Attendance | Source |
|---|---|---|---|---|---|
| October 2 | St. John's (MD) | American League Park; Washington, DC | W 80–0 | | |
| October 9 | NC State | American League Park; Washington, DC | W 27–0 | | |
| October 16 | West Virginia Wesleyan* | American League Park; Washington, DC | W 27–7 | | |
| October 23 | at Fordham* | Fordham Field; Bronx, NY | W 40–16 | 10,000 | |
| October 30 | at Johns Hopkins | Homewood Field; Baltimore, MD | W 28–7 | | |
| November 6 | at Navy* | Worden Field; Annapolis, MD | L 6–21 | | |
| November 13 | at Georgia Tech* | Grant Field; Atlanta, GA | L 6–21 | | |
| November 20 | Washington and Lee | American League Park; Washington, DC | L 7–16 | | |
| November 27 | at Boston College* | Braves Field; Boston, MA | L 0–30 | 20,000 | |
| December 4 | Bethany (WV)* | American League Park; Washington, DC | W 14–6 | | |
*Non-conference game
