= 1920 Sam Houston Normal football team =

American college football season

1920 Sam Houston Normal football
- Conference: Independent
- Record: 1–4–2
- Head coach: Mutt Gee (1st season)
- Home stadium: Pritchett Field

1920 Southern college football independents records
	Conf.			Overall
Team	W	L	T	W		L		T
Talladega		–		?	–	0	–	0
Trinity (NC)		–		4	–	0	–	1
Abilene Christian		–		4	–	0	–	1
North Texas State Normal		–		7	–	1	–	0
Presbyterian		–		5	–	1	–	1
Middle Tennessee State Normal		–		4	–	1	–	0
Navy		–		6	–	2	–	0
Spring Hill		–		6	–	2	–	0
Birmingham–Southern		–		6	–	3	–	0
Mississippi Normal		–		4	–	2	–	1
Southwest Texas State		–		4	–	2	–	1
East Tennessee State Normal		–		3	–	2	–	0
West Virginia		–		5	–	4	–	1
Oglethorpe		–		4	–	4	–	1
Delaware		–		3	–	5	–	1
Stetson		–		2	–	4	–	0
Texas Mines		–		2	–	4	–	0
Marion		–		2	–	5	–	0
Wake Forest		–		2	–	7	–	0
Sam Houston Normal		–		1	–	4	–	2
Western Kentucky State Normal		–		0	–	1	–	0
West Tennessee State Normal		–		0	–	5	–	0
Marshall		–		0	–	8	–	0

The 1920 Sam Houston Normal football team represented Sam Houston Normal Institute (now known as Sam Houston State University) as an independent during the 1920 college football season. Led by first-year head coach Mutt Gee, Sam Houston compiled an overall record of 1–4–2.

== Schedule ==
Date	Opponent	Site	Result	Source
October 11	at Rice freshmen	Rice Field; Houston, TX	L 18–37	
October 15	Alexander Institute	Pritchett Field; Huntsville, TX	T 14–14	
October 22	at Southwest Texas State	Evans Field; San Marcos, TX (rivalry)	L 0–32	
November 1	Rice freshmen	Pritchett Field; Huntsville, TX	T 0–0	
November 11	Huntsville American Legion	Pritchett Field; Huntsville, TX	L 0–6	
November 12	at Navasota High School	Boone Field; Navasota, TX	L 0–27	
November 25	East Texas State	Pritchett Field; Huntsville, TX	W 14–7	
