= 1920 West Tennessee State Normal football team =

American college football season

1920 West Tennessee State Normal football
- Conference: Independent
- Record: 0–5
- Head coach: Elmer George (1st season)
- Captain: Fred Grantham
- Home stadium: Russwood Park

1920 Southern college football independents records
	Conf.			Overall
Team	W	L	T	W		L		T
Talladega		–		?	–	0	–	0
Trinity (NC)		–		4	–	0	–	1
Abilene Christian		–		4	–	0	–	1
North Texas State Normal		–		7	–	1	–	0
Presbyterian		–		5	–	1	–	1
Middle Tennessee State Normal		–		4	–	1	–	0
Navy		–		6	–	2	–	0
Spring Hill		–		6	–	2	–	0
Birmingham–Southern		–		6	–	3	–	0
Mississippi Normal		–		4	–	2	–	1
Southwest Texas State		–		4	–	2	–	1
East Tennessee State Normal		–		3	–	2	–	0
West Virginia		–		5	–	4	–	1
Oglethorpe		–		4	–	4	–	1
Delaware		–		3	–	5	–	1
Stetson		–		2	–	4	–	0
Texas Mines		–		2	–	4	–	0
Marion		–		2	–	5	–	0
Wake Forest		–		2	–	7	–	0
Sam Houston Normal		–		1	–	4	–	2
Western Kentucky State Normal		–		0	–	1	–	0
West Tennessee State Normal		–		0	–	5	–	0
Marshall		–		0	–	8	–	0

The 1920 West Tennessee State Normal football team was an American football team that represented West Tennessee State Normal School (now known as the University of Memphis) as an independent during the 1920 college football season. In their first season under head coach Elmer George, West Tennessee State Normal compiled a 0–5 record.

== Schedule ==
Date	Time	Opponent	Site	Result	Attendance	Source
October 11		at Jonesboro Aggies	Kays Field; Jonesboro, AR (rivalry)	L 0–13		
October 23	3:00 p.m.	Union (TN)	Russwood Park; Memphis, TN	L 0–19		
October 30	3:00 p.m.	at Little Rock	Kavanaugh Field; Little Rock, AR	L 0–41		
November 1		at Arkansas Normal	Normal Field; Conway, AR	L 0–35		
November 11		at Paragould High School	Paragould, AR	L 7–35	3,000	
All times are in Central time
