= 1920 Southwest Texas State Bobcats football team =

American college football season

1920 Southwest Texas State Bobcats football
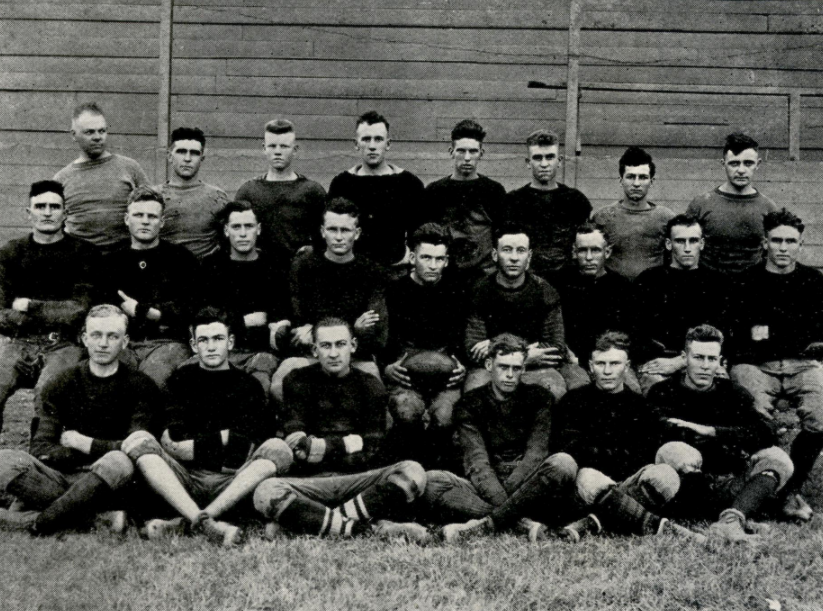
- Conference: Independent
- Record: 5–2–1
- Head coach: Oscar W. Strahan (2nd season)
- Captain: Jesse C. Kellam
- Home stadium: Evans Field

1920 Southern college football independents records
	Conf.			Overall
Team	W	L	T	W		L		T
Talladega		–		?	–	0	–	0
Trinity (NC)		–		4	–	0	–	1
Abilene Christian		–		4	–	0	–	1
North Texas State Normal		–		7	–	1	–	0
Presbyterian		–		5	–	1	–	1
Middle Tennessee State Normal		–		4	–	1	–	0
Navy		–		6	–	2	–	0
Spring Hill		–		6	–	2	–	0
Birmingham–Southern		–		6	–	3	–	0
Mississippi Normal		–		4	–	2	–	1
Southwest Texas State		–		4	–	2	–	1
East Tennessee State Normal		–		3	–	2	–	0
West Virginia		–		5	–	4	–	1
Oglethorpe		–		4	–	4	–	1
Delaware		–		3	–	5	–	1
Stetson		–		2	–	4	–	0
Texas Mines		–		2	–	4	–	0
Marion		–		2	–	5	–	0
Wake Forest		–		2	–	7	–	0
Sam Houston Normal		–		1	–	4	–	2
Western Kentucky State Normal		–		0	–	1	–	0
West Tennessee State Normal		–		0	–	5	–	0
Marshall		–		0	–	8	–	0

The 1920 Southwest Texas State Bobcats football team was an American football team that represented Southwest Texas State Normal School—now known as Texas State University–as an independent during the 1920 college football season. The 1920 Southwest Texas State team adopted the nickname "Bobcats" after the University Star had an editorial campaign to introduce an athletic mascot. Prior to this season the team had no nickname.

Bobcats were led by second-year head coach Oscar W. Strahan and played their home games at Evans Field in San Marcos, Texas. The team's captain was Jesse C. Kellam, who played halfback. Southwest Texas State finished the season with a record of 5–2–1.

== Schedule ==
Date	Opponent	Site	Result	Source
October 1	Meridian	Evans Field; San Marcos, TX	W 78–0	
October 9	at Southwestern (TX)	Georgetown, TX	T 3–3	
October 15	East Texas State	San Marcos, TX	W 48–0	
October 22	at Sam Houston Normal	Evans Field; San Marcos, TX (rivalry)	W 32–0	
October 30	Daniel Baker	Evans Field; San Marcos, TX	W 40–0	
November 11	at San Marcos Baptist Academy	Talbot Field; San Marcos, TX	W 26–13	
November 19	at Rice	Rice Field; Houston, TX	L 0–48	
November 25	at North Texas State Normal	Denton, TX	L 6–13	
