= 1920 Washington and Lee Generals football team =

American college football season

1920 Washington and Lee Generals football
- Conference: South Atlantic Intercollegiate Athletic Association
- Record: 5–3 (3–0 SAIAA)
- Head coach: W. C. Raftery (4th season)
- Home stadium: Wilson Field

1920 South Atlantic Intercollegiate Athletic Association football standings
	Conf.					Overall
Team	W		L		T	W		L		T
VMI $	5	–	0	–	0	9	–	0	–	0
Maryland	4	–	0	–	0	7	–	2	–	0
Washington and Lee	3	–	0	–	0	5	–	3	–	0
Georgetown	3	–	1	–	0	6	–	4	–	0
Virginia	3	–	1	–	0	5	–	2	–	2
NC State	4	–	2	–	0	7	–	3	–	0
Richmond	2	–	2	–	0	6	–	2	–	0
Davidson	2	–	2	–	0	5	–	5	–	0
VPI	2	–	4	–	0	4	–	6	–	0
Catholic University	1	–	3	–	0	3	–	5	–	0
George Washington	0	–	1	–	0	1	–	6	–	1
St. John's (MD)	0	–	1	–	0	0	–	1	–	0
Johns Hopkins	0	–	2	–	0	0	–	3	–	0
William & Mary	0	–	4	–	0	4	–	5	–	0
North Carolina	0	–	5	–	0	2	–	6	–	0
$ – Conference champion

The 1920 Washington and Lee Generals football team was an American football team that represented Washington and Lee University as a member of the South Atlantic Intercollegiate Athletic Association (SAIAA) during the 1920 college football season. In their fourth season under head coach W. C. Raftery, Washington and Lee compiled a 5–3 record.

== Schedule ==
Date	Opponent	Site	Result	Source
October 2	Davidson	Wilson Field; Lexington, VA	W 6–0	
October 9	Wake Forest*	Wilson Field; Lexington, VA	W 27–0	
October 16	at Princeton*	Palmer Stadium; Princeton, NJ	L 0–34	
October 23	Roanoke*	Wilson Field; Lexington, VA	W 49–7	
October 30	vs. VPI	Fair Grounds; Lynchburg, VA	W 13–0	
November 6	vs. West Virginia*	Laidley Field; Charleston, WV	L 10–14	
November 13	at Auburn*	Rickwood Field; Birmingham, AL	L 0–77	
November 20	at Georgetown	American League Park; Washington, DC	W 16–7	
*Non-conference game
