= 1920 Virginia Orange and Blue football team =

American college football season

1920 Virginia Orange and Blue football
- Conference: South Atlantic Intercollegiate Athletic Association
- Record: 5–2–2 (3–1 SAIAA)
- Head coach: W. Rice Warren (2nd season)
- Home stadium: Lambeth Field

1920 South Atlantic Intercollegiate Athletic Association football standings
	Conf.					Overall
Team	W		L		T	W		L		T
VMI $	5	–	0	–	0	9	–	0	–	0
Maryland	4	–	0	–	0	7	–	2	–	0
Washington and Lee	3	–	0	–	0	5	–	3	–	0
Georgetown	3	–	1	–	0	6	–	4	–	0
Virginia	3	–	1	–	0	5	–	2	–	2
NC State	4	–	2	–	0	7	–	3	–	0
Richmond	2	–	2	–	0	6	–	2	–	0
Davidson	2	–	2	–	0	5	–	5	–	0
VPI	2	–	4	–	0	4	–	6	–	0
Catholic University	1	–	3	–	0	3	–	5	–	0
George Washington	0	–	1	–	0	1	–	6	–	1
St. John's (MD)	0	–	1	–	0	0	–	1	–	0
Johns Hopkins	0	–	2	–	0	0	–	3	–	0
William & Mary	0	–	4	–	0	4	–	5	–	0
North Carolina	0	–	5	–	0	2	–	6	–	0
$ – Conference champion

The 1920 Virginia Orange and Blue football team represented the University of Virginia as a member of the South Atlantic Intercollegiate Athletic Association (SAIAA) during the 1920 college football season. Led by second-year head coach W. Rice Warren, who had helmed the team in 1913, the Orange and Blue compiled an overall record of 5–2–2 with a mark of 3–1 in conference play, tying for fourth place in the SAIAA.

== Schedule ==
Date	Opponent	Site	Result	Source
September 25	William & Mary*	Lambeth Field; Charlottesville, VA	W 27–0	
October 2	Randolph–Macon*	Lambeth Field; Charlottesville, VA	W 65–0	
October 9	VMI*	Lambeth Field; Charlottesville, VA	L 6–22	
October 16	at Johns Hopkins	Homewood Field; Baltimore, MD	W 14–0	
October 23	at Rutgers	Neilson Field; New Brunswick, NJ	W 7–0	
October 30	at Harvard*	Harvard Stadium; Boston, MA	L 0–24	
November 6	Georgia*	Lambeth Field; Charlottesville, VA	T 0–0	
November 13	at Vanderbilt*	Dudley Field; Nashville, TN	T 7–7	
November 25	North Carolina	Lambeth Field; Charlottesville, VA (rivalry)	W 14–0	
*Non-conference game
