= 1920 Trinity Blue and White football team =

American college football season

1920 Trinity Blue and White football
- Conference: Independent
- Record: 4–0–1
- Head coach: Floyd J. Egan (1st season)
- Captain: B. B. Jones

1920 Southern college football independents records
| | Conf. | | | Overall |
| Team | W | L | T | W | | L | | T |
|---|---|---|---|---|---|---|---|---|
| Talladega | | – | | ? | – | 0 | – | 0 |
| Trinity (NC) | | – | | 4 | – | 0 | – | 1 |
| Abilene Christian | | – | | 4 | – | 0 | – | 1 |
| North Texas State Normal | | – | | 7 | – | 1 | – | 0 |
| Presbyterian | | – | | 5 | – | 1 | – | 1 |
| Middle Tennessee State Normal | | – | | 4 | – | 1 | – | 0 |
| Navy | | – | | 6 | – | 2 | – | 0 |
| Spring Hill | | – | | 6 | – | 2 | – | 0 |
| Birmingham–Southern | | – | | 6 | – | 3 | – | 0 |
| Mississippi Normal | | – | | 4 | – | 2 | – | 1 |
| Southwest Texas State | | – | | 4 | – | 2 | – | 1 |
| East Tennessee State Normal | | – | | 3 | – | 2 | – | 0 |
| West Virginia | | – | | 5 | – | 4 | – | 1 |
| Oglethorpe | | – | | 4 | – | 4 | – | 1 |
| Delaware | | – | | 3 | – | 5 | – | 1 |
| Stetson | | – | | 2 | – | 4 | – | 0 |
| Texas Mines | | – | | 2 | – | 4 | – | 0 |
| Marion | | – | | 2 | – | 5 | – | 0 |
| Wake Forest | | – | | 2 | – | 7 | – | 0 |
| Sam Houston Normal | | – | | 1 | – | 4 | – | 2 |
| Western Kentucky State Normal | | – | | 0 | – | 1 | – | 0 |
| West Tennessee State Normal | | – | | 0 | – | 5 | – | 0 |
| Marshall | | – | | 0 | – | 8 | – | 0 |

The 1920 Trinity Blue and White football team was an American football team that represented Trinity College (later renamed Duke University) as an independent during the 1920 college football season. In its first and only season under head coach Floyd J. Egan, the team compiled a 4–0–1 record. B. B. Jones was the team captain.

== Schedule ==
| Date | Opponent | Site | Result | Source |
|---|---|---|---|---|
| October 16 | Guilford | Hanes Field; Durham, NC | W 20–7 | |
| October 23 | Emory and Henry | Hanes Field; Durham, NC | W 7–0 | |
| October 30 | Lynchburg | Hanes Field; Durham, NC | W 13–7 | |
| November 13 | Elon | Hanes Field; Durham, NC | W 13–6 | |
| November 25 | Wofford | Hanes Field; Durham, NC | T 0–0 | |
