= 1920 Marion Cadets football team =

American college football season

1920 Marion Cadets football
- Conference: Independent
- Record: 2–5
- Head coach: Wilbur Argo

1920 Southern college football independents records
	Conf.			Overall
Team	W	L	T	W		L		T
Talladega		–		?	–	0	–	0
Trinity (NC)		–		4	–	0	–	1
Abilene Christian		–		4	–	0	–	1
North Texas State Normal		–		7	–	1	–	0
Presbyterian		–		5	–	1	–	1
Middle Tennessee State Normal		–		4	–	1	–	0
Navy		–		6	–	2	–	0
Spring Hill		–		6	–	2	–	0
Birmingham–Southern		–		6	–	3	–	0
Mississippi Normal		–		4	–	2	–	1
Southwest Texas State		–		4	–	2	–	1
East Tennessee State Normal		–		3	–	2	–	0
West Virginia		–		5	–	4	–	1
Oglethorpe		–		4	–	4	–	1
Delaware		–		3	–	5	–	1
Texas Mines		–		2	–	4	–	0
Marion		–		2	–	5	–	0
Wake Forest		–		2	–	7	–	0
Sam Houston Normal		–		1	–	4	–	2
Western Kentucky State Normal		–		0	–	1	–	0
West Tennessee State Normal		–		0	–	5	–	0
Marshall		–		0	–	8	–	0

The 1920 Marion Cadets football team was an American football team that represented the Marion Military Institute as an independent during the 1920 college football season. The Cadets compiled an overall record of 2–5.

== Schedule ==
Date	Opponent	Site	Result	Source
September 23	at Auburn	Drake Field; Auburn, AL	L 0–35	
October 2	at Alabama	University Field; Tuscaloosa, AL	L 0–49	
October 16	at Spring Hill	Monroe Park; Mobile, AL	L 7–13	
October 22	Birmingham–Southern	Selma, AL	L 6–17	
October 29	at Howard (AL)	Eagles Field; Birmingham, AL	L 0–21	
November 5	at Southern Military Academy	Greensboro, AL	W 21–7	
November 15	Southern Military Academy	Marion, AL	W 13–0	
