= 1920 Wake Forest Baptists football team =

American college football season

1920 Wake Forest Baptists football
- Conference: Independent
- Record: 2–7
- Head coach: James L. White (1st season)
- Captain: Harry Rabenhorst

1920 Southern college football independents records
	Conf.			Overall
Team	W	L	T	W		L		T
Talladega		–		?	–	0	–	0
Trinity (NC)		–		4	–	0	–	1
Abilene Christian		–		4	–	0	–	1
North Texas State Normal		–		7	–	1	–	0
Presbyterian		–		5	–	1	–	1
Middle Tennessee State Normal		–		4	–	1	–	0
Navy		–		6	–	2	–	0
Spring Hill		–		6	–	2	–	0
Birmingham–Southern		–		6	–	3	–	0
Mississippi Normal		–		4	–	2	–	1
Southwest Texas State		–		4	–	2	–	1
East Tennessee State Normal		–		3	–	2	–	0
West Virginia		–		5	–	4	–	1
Oglethorpe		–		4	–	4	–	1
Delaware		–		3	–	5	–	1
Stetson		–		2	–	4	–	0
Texas Mines		–		2	–	4	–	0
Marion		–		2	–	5	–	0
Wake Forest		–		2	–	7	–	0
Sam Houston Normal		–		1	–	4	–	2
Western Kentucky State Normal		–		0	–	1	–	0
West Tennessee State Normal		–		0	–	5	–	0
Marshall		–		0	–	8	–	0

The 1920 Wake Forest Baptists football team was an American football team that represented Wake Forest University during the 1920 college football season. In its first season under head coach James L. White, the team compiled a 2–7 record.

== Schedule ==
Date	Opponent	Site	Result	Source
September 25	at Georgia Tech	Grant Field; Atlanta, GA	L 0–44	
October 2	at North Carolina	Emerson Field; Chapel Hill, NC (rivalry)	L 0–6	
October 9	at Washington and Lee	Wilson Field; Lexington, VA	L 0–27	
October 16	at Davidson	Wearn Field; Charlotte, NC	L 7–27	
October 23	at Furman	Manly Field; Greenville, SC	L 0–17	
October 30	Guilford	Wake Forest, NC	W 48–0	
November 6	Elon	Wake Forest, NC	W 29–0	
November 13	at Richmond	Boulevard Field; Richmond, VA	L 7–20	
November 25	NC State	Wake Forest, NC (rivalry)	L 7–49	
