= 1920 NC State Aggies football team =

American college football season

1920 NC State Aggies football
- Conference: South Atlantic Intercollegiate Athletic Association
- Record: 7–3 (4–2 SAIAA)
- Head coach: Bill Fetzer (2nd season)
- Home stadium: Riddick Stadium

1920 South Atlantic Intercollegiate Athletic Association football standings
	Conf.					Overall
Team	W		L		T	W		L		T
VMI $	5	–	0	–	0	9	–	0	–	0
Maryland	4	–	0	–	0	7	–	2	–	0
Washington and Lee	3	–	0	–	0	5	–	3	–	0
Georgetown	3	–	1	–	0	6	–	4	–	0
Virginia	3	–	1	–	0	5	–	2	–	2
NC State	4	–	2	–	0	7	–	3	–	0
Richmond	2	–	2	–	0	6	–	2	–	0
Davidson	2	–	2	–	0	5	–	5	–	0
VPI	2	–	4	–	0	4	–	6	–	0
Catholic University	1	–	3	–	0	3	–	5	–	0
George Washington	0	–	1	–	0	1	–	6	–	1
St. John's (MD)	0	–	1	–	0	0	–	1	–	0
Johns Hopkins	0	–	2	–	0	0	–	3	–	0
William & Mary	0	–	4	–	0	4	–	5	–	0
North Carolina	0	–	5	–	0	2	–	6	–	0
$ – Conference champion

The 1920 North Carolina State Aggies football team was an American football team represented North Carolina State University in the South Atlantic Intercollegiate Athletic Association (SAIAA) during the 1920 college football season. In its second season under head coach Bill Fetzer, the team compiled a 7–3 record.

== Schedule ==
Date	Time	Opponent	Site	Result	Attendance	Source
September 25		Davidson	Riddick Stadium; Raleigh, NC	W 23–0		
October 2		at Navy*	Worden Field; Annapolis, MD	W 14–7		
October 9		at Georgetown	American League Park; Washington, DC	L 0–27		
October 16		at Penn State*	New Beaver Field; University Park, PA	L 0–41	3,500	
October 21		North Carolina	Riddick Stadium; Raleigh, NC (rivalry)	W 13–3	8,000	
October 30		at VMI	VMI Parade Ground; Lexington, VA	L 0–14		
November 6		William & Mary	Riddick Stadium; Raleigh, NC	W 81–0		
November 11	3:00 p.m.	vs. VPI	League Park; Norfolk, VA	W 14–6	5,000	
November 20		Wofford*	Riddick Stadium; Raleigh, NC	W 90–7		
November 25		at Wake Forest*	Wake Forest, NC (rivalry)	W 49–7		
*Non-conference game
