= 1920 Maryland Aggies football team =

American college football season

1920 Maryland Aggies football
- Conference: South Atlantic Intercollegiate Athletic Association
- Record: 7–2 (4–0 SAIAA)
- Head coach: Curley Byrd (10th season)

1920 South Atlantic Intercollegiate Athletic Association football standings
	Conf.					Overall
Team	W		L		T	W		L		T
VMI $	5	–	0	–	0	9	–	0	–	0
Maryland	4	–	0	–	0	7	–	2	–	0
Washington and Lee	3	–	0	–	0	5	–	3	–	0
Georgetown	3	–	1	–	0	6	–	4	–	0
Virginia	3	–	1	–	0	5	–	2	–	2
NC State	4	–	2	–	0	7	–	3	–	0
Richmond	2	–	2	–	0	6	–	2	–	0
Davidson	2	–	2	–	0	5	–	5	–	0
VPI	2	–	4	–	0	4	–	6	–	0
Catholic University	1	–	3	–	0	3	–	5	–	0
George Washington	0	–	1	–	0	1	–	6	–	1
St. John's (MD)	0	–	1	–	0	0	–	1	–	0
Johns Hopkins	0	–	2	–	0	0	–	3	–	0
William & Mary	0	–	4	–	0	4	–	5	–	0
North Carolina	0	–	5	–	0	2	–	6	–	0
$ – Conference champion

The 1920 Maryland Aggies football team was an American football team that represented the University of Maryland in the South Atlantic Intercollegiate Athletic Association (SAIAA) during the 1920 college football season. In their 10th season under head coach Curley Byrd, the Aggies compiled a 7–2 record (4–0 against SAIAA opponents), shut out five of nine opponents, and outscored all opponents by a total of 149 to 55. The team's victories included games against VPI (7–0), North Carolina (10–0), Syracuse (10–7), and Johns Hopkins (24–7). The losses were sustained against Rutgers (6–0) and Princeton (35–0).

== Schedule ==
Date	Opponent	Site	Result	Attendance	Source
September 25	Randolph–Macon*	College Park, MD	W 54–0		
October 2	at Rutgers*	Neilson Field; New Brunswick, NJ	L 0–6		
October 9	at Princeton*	Palmer Stadium; Princeton, NJ	L 0–35		
October 16	Washington College*	College Park, MD	W 27–0		
October 23	at VPI	Miles Field; Blacksburg, VA	W 7–0		
October 30	at North Carolina	Emerson Field; Chapel Hill, NC	W 13–0		
November 6	at Catholic University	Washington, DC	W 14–0		
November 13	at Syracuse*	Syracuse, NY	W 10–7	3,500	
November 25	at Johns Hopkins	Baltimore, MD	W 24–7		
*Non-conference game
