= 1920 Davidson Wildcats football team =

American college football season

1920 Davidson Wildcats football
- Conference: South Atlantic Intercollegiate Athletic Association
- Record: 5–5 (2–2 SAIAA)
- Head coach: H. M. Grey (1st season)
- Home stadium: Sprunt Field

1920 South Atlantic Intercollegiate Athletic Association football standings
	Conf.					Overall
Team	W		L		T	W		L		T
VMI $	5	–	0	–	0	9	–	0	–	0
Maryland	4	–	0	–	0	7	–	2	–	0
Washington and Lee	3	–	0	–	0	5	–	3	–	0
Georgetown	3	–	1	–	0	6	–	4	–	0
Virginia	3	–	1	–	0	5	–	2	–	2
NC State	4	–	2	–	0	7	–	3	–	0
Richmond	2	–	2	–	0	6	–	2	–	0
Davidson	2	–	2	–	0	5	–	5	–	0
VPI	2	–	4	–	0	4	–	6	–	0
Catholic University	1	–	3	–	0	3	–	5	–	0
George Washington	0	–	1	–	0	1	–	6	–	1
St. John's (MD)	0	–	1	–	0	0	–	1	–	0
Johns Hopkins	0	–	2	–	0	0	–	3	–	0
William & Mary	0	–	4	–	0	4	–	5	–	0
North Carolina	0	–	5	–	0	2	–	6	–	0
$ – Conference champion

The 1920 Davidson Wildcats football team was an American football team that represented the Davidson College as a member of the South Atlantic Intercollegiate Athletic Association (SAIAA), during the 1920 college football season. In their first year under head coach H. M. Grey, the team compiled a 5–5 record.

== Schedule ==
Date	Opponent	Site	Result	Source
September 25	at NC State	Riddick Stadium; Raleigh, NC	L 0–23	
October 2	at Washington and Lee	Wilson Field; Lexington, VA	L 0–6	
October 9	at Georgia Tech*	Grant Field; Atlanta, GA	L 0–66	
October 16	vs. Wake Forest*	Wearn Field; Charlotte, NC	W 27–7	
October 23	at Richmond	Boulevard Field; Richmond, VA	W 7–0	
October 30	vs. The Citadel*	Wearn Field; Charlotte, NC	W 27–13	
November 6	South Carolina*	Sprunt Field; Davidson, NC	W 27–0	
November 13	vs. North Carolina	Prince Albert Park; Winston-Salem, NC	W 7–0	
November 19	at Presbyterian*	Clinton, SC	L 7–0	
November 25	at Furman*	Manly Field; Greenville, SC	L 0–7	
*Non-conference game
