= 1920 North Texas State Normal football team =

American college football season

1920 North Texas State Normal football
- Conference: Independent
- Record: 7–1
- Head coach: Theron J. Fouts (1st season)
- Home stadium: Eagle Field

1920 Southern college football independents records
	Conf.			Overall
Team	W	L	T	W		L		T
Talladega		–		?	–	0	–	0
Trinity (NC)		–		4	–	0	–	1
Abilene Christian		–		4	–	0	–	1
North Texas State Normal		–		7	–	1	–	0
Presbyterian		–		5	–	1	–	1
Middle Tennessee State Normal		–		4	–	1	–	0
Navy		–		6	–	2	–	0
Spring Hill		–		6	–	2	–	0
Birmingham–Southern		–		6	–	3	–	0
Mississippi Normal		–		4	–	2	–	1
Southwest Texas State		–		4	–	2	–	1
East Tennessee State Normal		–		3	–	2	–	0
West Virginia		–		5	–	4	–	1
Oglethorpe		–		4	–	4	–	1
Delaware		–		3	–	5	–	1
Stetson		–		2	–	4	–	0
Texas Mines		–		2	–	4	–	0
Marion		–		2	–	5	–	0
Wake Forest		–		2	–	7	–	0
Sam Houston Normal		–		1	–	4	–	2
Western Kentucky State Normal		–		0	–	1	–	0
West Tennessee State Normal		–		0	–	5	–	0
Marshall		–		0	–	8	–	0

The 1920 North Texas State Normal football team was an American football team that represented the North Texas State Normal College (now known as the University of North Texas) during the 1920 college football season as an independent. In their first year under head coach Theron J. Fouts, the team compiled an overall record of 7–1.

== Schedule ==
Date	Opponent	Site	Result	Source
October 1	at Burleson	Greenville, TX	W 48–12	
October 8	at Simmons	Parramore Field; Abilene, TX	W 7–6	
October 15	Oklahoma Baptist	Eagle Field; Denton, TX	W 29–0	
October 22	Meridian College	Eagle Field; Denton, TX	W 41–0	
October 29	Southeastern Oklahoma Normal	Eagle Field; Denton, TX	W 47–0	
November	at Tarleton Agricultural College	Stephenville, TX	L 7–20	
November	Baylor Cubs	Eagle Field; Denton, TX	W 28–0	
November 25	Southwest Texas State	Eagle Field; Denton, TX	W 13–6	
