= 1920 Talladega football team =

American college football season

1920 Talladega football

Black college national co-champion
- Conference: Independent
- Head coach: Jubie Bragg (1st season)
- Home stadium: Silsby Athletic Field

1920 Southern college football independents records
	Conf.			Overall
Team	W	L	T	W		L		T
Talladega		–		?	–	0	–	0
Trinity (NC)		–		4	–	0	–	1
Abilene Christian		–		4	–	0	–	1
North Texas State Normal		–		7	–	1	–	0
Presbyterian		–		5	–	1	–	1
Middle Tennessee State Normal		–		4	–	1	–	0
Navy		–		6	–	2	–	0
Spring Hill		–		6	–	2	–	0
Birmingham–Southern		–		6	–	3	–	0
Mississippi Normal		–		4	–	2	–	1
Southwest Texas State		–		4	–	2	–	1
East Tennessee State Normal		–		3	–	2	–	0
West Virginia		–		5	–	4	–	1
Oglethorpe		–		4	–	4	–	1
Delaware		–		3	–	5	–	1
Stetson		–		2	–	4	–	0
Texas Mines		–		2	–	4	–	0
Marion		–		2	–	5	–	0
Wake Forest		–		2	–	7	–	0
Sam Houston Normal		–		1	–	4	–	2
Western Kentucky State Normal		–		0	–	1	–	0
West Tennessee State Normal		–		0	–	5	–	0
Marshall		–		0	–	8	–	0

The 1920 Talladega football team was an American football team that represented the Talladega College during the 1920 college football season. The team was led by head coach Jubie Bragg.

Talladega concluded an undefeated season on November 25 with a 28–0 victory over the previously unbeaten team from Tuskegee Institute. The Talladega newspaper reported: "A large crowd saw the game. Many negroes from nearby cities were here for the contest." The Birmingham News reported: "It was the good old American game of football with the ambulance kept near to waft away the victimes. The championship for Talladega hung upon this game, and no wonder it had all the thrills of a 'bull fight.'"

The team's key players included right halfback C. Cox, center S. Coles from Talladega, right end "Nap" Rivers from Mobile, and quarterback "Skeats" Gordon from Cave Springs, Georgia.

As a historically black college, Talladega was unable to play games against white colleges and competed with other historically black colleges. In 1920, the Pittsburgh Courier, an African-American weekly newspaper, began selecting national champions from the black college football teams. The Courier selected Talladega and Howard as the co-champions for the 1920 season. Another source in January 1921 rated Talladega, Howard, and West Virginia Collegiate Institute as the top three "colored" football teams during the 1920 season.

== Schedule ==
Date	Opponent	Site	Result	Attendance	Source
October 16	Miles Memorial	Talladega, AL	W 33–0		
October 22	Clark	Talladega, AL	W 80–0		
October 30	at Atlanta	Atlanta, GA	W 7–2		
November 3	Florida A&M	Silsby Athletic Field; Talladega, AL	W		
November 25	Tuskegee	Silsby Athletic Field; Talladega, AL	W 28–0		
