= 1920 Delaware Fightin' Blue Hens football team =

American college football season

1920 Delaware Fightin' Blue Hens football
- Conference: Independent
- Record: 3–5–1
- Head coach: Burton Shipley (2nd season)
- Home stadium: Frazer Field

1920 Southern college football independents records
	Conf.			Overall
Team	W	L	T	W		L		T
Talladega		–		?	–	0	–	0
Trinity (NC)		–		4	–	0	–	1
Abilene Christian		–		4	–	0	–	1
North Texas State Normal		–		7	–	1	–	0
Presbyterian		–		5	–	1	–	1
Middle Tennessee State Normal		–		4	–	1	–	0
Navy		–		6	–	2	–	0
Spring Hill		–		6	–	2	–	0
Birmingham–Southern		–		6	–	3	–	0
Mississippi Normal		–		4	–	2	–	1
Southwest Texas State		–		4	–	2	–	1
East Tennessee State Normal		–		3	–	2	–	0
West Virginia		–		5	–	4	–	1
Oglethorpe		–		4	–	4	–	1
Delaware		–		3	–	5	–	1
Stetson		–		2	–	4	–	0
Texas Mines		–		2	–	4	–	0
Marion		–		2	–	5	–	0
Wake Forest		–		2	–	7	–	0
Sam Houston Normal		–		1	–	4	–	2
Western Kentucky State Normal		–		0	–	1	–	0
West Tennessee State Normal		–		0	–	5	–	0
Marshall		–		0	–	8	–	0

The 1920 Delaware Fightin' Blue Hens football team was an American football team that represented Delaware College (later renamed the University of Delaware) in the 1920 college football season. In their second and final season under head coach Burton Shipley, the Blue Hens compiled a 3–5–1 record and were outscored by a total of 201 to 55. The team played its home games at Frazer Field in Newark, Delaware.

== Schedule ==
Date	Opponent	Site	Result	Attendance	Source
September 25	at Penn	Franklin Field; Philadelphia, PA	L 0–35		
October 1	Ursinus	Frazer Field; Newark, DE	W 14–0		
October 9	at George Washington	Gallaudet College Field; Washington, DC	W 14–7		
October 16	St. John's (MD)	Frazer Field; Newark, DE	W 20–0		
October 23	Haverford	Frazer Field; Newark, DE	L 0–14		
November 6	at Stevens	Hoboken, NJ	L 0–48		
November 13	at Swarthmore	Swarthmore, PA	L 0–62		
November 20	Dickinson	Newark, DE	L 7–35		
November 25	at Pennsylvania Military	Chester, PA	T 0–0		
