= 1920 North Carolina Tar Heels football team =

American college football season

1920 North Carolina Tar Heels football
- Conference: South Atlantic Intercollegiate Athletic Association
- Record: 2–6 (0–5 SAIAA)
- Head coach: Myron Fuller (1st season)
- Captain: Beemer Harrell
- Home stadium: Emerson Field

1920 South Atlantic Intercollegiate Athletic Association football standings
	Conf.					Overall
Team	W		L		T	W		L		T
VMI $	5	–	0	–	0	9	–	0	–	0
Maryland	4	–	0	–	0	7	–	2	–	0
Washington and Lee	3	–	0	–	0	5	–	3	–	0
Georgetown	3	–	1	–	0	6	–	4	–	0
Virginia	3	–	1	–	0	5	–	2	–	2
NC State	4	–	2	–	0	7	–	3	–	0
Richmond	2	–	2	–	0	6	–	2	–	0
Davidson	2	–	2	–	0	5	–	5	–	0
VPI	2	–	4	–	0	4	–	6	–	0
Catholic University	1	–	3	–	0	3	–	5	–	0
George Washington	0	–	1	–	0	1	–	6	–	1
St. John's (MD)	0	–	1	–	0	0	–	1	–	0
Johns Hopkins	0	–	2	–	0	0	–	3	–	0
William & Mary	0	–	4	–	0	4	–	5	–	0
North Carolina	0	–	5	–	0	2	–	6	–	0
$ – Conference champion

The 1920 North Carolina Tar Heels football team was an American football team that represented the University of North Carolina (now known as the University of North Carolina at Chapel Hill) as a member of the South Atlantic Intercollegiate Athletic Association (SAIAA) during the 1920 college football season. In their first season under head coach Myron Fuller, North Carolina compiled a 2–6 record.

== Schedule ==
Date	Time	Opponent	Site	Result	Attendance	Source
October 2	3:00 p.m.	Wake Forest*	Emerson Field; Chapel Hill, NC (rivalry)	W 6–0	2,000	
October 9	3:00 p.m.	at Yale*	Yale Bowl; New Haven, CT	L 0–21		
October 16		South Carolina*	Emerson Field; Chapel Hill, NC (rivalry)	W 7–0		
October 21	3:30 p.m.	at NC State	Riddick Field; Raleigh, NC (rivalry)	L 3–13	8,000	
October 30		Maryland	Emerson Field; Chapel Hill, NC	L 0–13		
November 6		VMI	Emerson Field; Chapel Hill, NC	L 0–23		
November 13	3:00 p.m.	vs. Davidson	Prince Albert Park; Winston-Salem, NC	L 0–7		
November 25	2:00 p.m.	at Virginia	Lambeth Field; Charlottesville, VA (rivalry)	L 0–14	6,000	
*Non-conference game; All times are in Eastern time
