= 1920 Marshall Thundering Herd football team =

American college football season

1920 Marshall Thundering Herd football
- Conference: Independent
- Record: 0–8
- Head coach: Herbert Cramer (1st season)
- Captain: Frank Crist
- Home stadium: Central Field

1920 Southern college football independents records
| | Conf. | | | Overall |
| Team | W | L | T | W | | L | | T |
|---|---|---|---|---|---|---|---|---|
| Talladega | | – | | ? | – | 0 | – | 0 |
| Trinity (NC) | | – | | 4 | – | 0 | – | 1 |
| Abilene Christian | | – | | 4 | – | 0 | – | 1 |
| North Texas State Normal | | – | | 7 | – | 1 | – | 0 |
| Presbyterian | | – | | 5 | – | 1 | – | 1 |
| Middle Tennessee State Normal | | – | | 4 | – | 1 | – | 0 |
| Navy | | – | | 6 | – | 2 | – | 0 |
| Spring Hill | | – | | 6 | – | 2 | – | 0 |
| Birmingham–Southern | | – | | 6 | – | 3 | – | 0 |
| Mississippi Normal | | – | | 4 | – | 2 | – | 1 |
| Southwest Texas State | | – | | 4 | – | 2 | – | 1 |
| East Tennessee State Normal | | – | | 3 | – | 2 | – | 0 |
| West Virginia | | – | | 5 | – | 4 | – | 1 |
| Oglethorpe | | – | | 4 | – | 4 | – | 1 |
| Delaware | | – | | 3 | – | 5 | – | 1 |
| Stetson | | – | | 2 | – | 4 | – | 0 |
| Texas Mines | | – | | 2 | – | 4 | – | 0 |
| Marion | | – | | 2 | – | 5 | – | 0 |
| Wake Forest | | – | | 2 | – | 7 | – | 0 |
| Sam Houston Normal | | – | | 1 | – | 4 | – | 2 |
| Western Kentucky State Normal | | – | | 0 | – | 1 | – | 0 |
| West Tennessee State Normal | | – | | 0 | – | 5 | – | 0 |
| Marshall | | – | | 0 | – | 8 | – | 0 |

The 1920 Marshall Thundering Herd football team represented Marshall College (now Marshall University) as an independent during the 1920 college football season. Marshall posted a winless 0–8 record, being outscored by its opposition 0–247. Home games were played on a campus field called "Central Field" which is presently Campus Commons.

== Schedule ==
| Date | Opponent | Site | Result |
|---|---|---|---|
| October 2 | at Army | The Plain; West Point, NY | L 0–38 |
| October 9 | Wesleyan | Central Field; Huntington, WV | L 0–13 |
| October 16 | at Ohio | Athens, OH (rivalry) | L 0–55 |
| October 23 | Davis & Elkins | Central Field; Huntington, WV | L 0–16 |
| November 6 | Ironton YMCA | Central Field; Huntington, WV | L 0–13 |
| November 13 | Rio Grande | Central Field; Huntington, WV | L 0–28 |
| November 20 | Muskingum | Central Field; Huntington, WV | L 0–37 |
| November 25 | Morris Harvey^{†} | Central Field; Huntington, WV | L 0–47 |
^{†}Homecoming
