= Sewell Jones =

American football coach

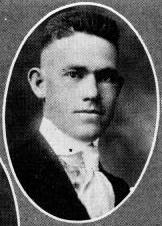
- Jones pictured in Prickly Pear 1921, Abilene Christian yearbook

Biographical details
- Born: February 21, 1897; Roswell, New Mexico, U.S.
- Died: March 6, 1981 (aged 84); Los Angeles County, California, U.S.
- Education: David Lipscomb University; Vanderbilt University; Abilene Christian College

Coaching career (HC unless noted)
- 1920: Abilene Christian

Head coaching record
- Overall: 4–0–1

Bryan Sewell Watson Jones (February 21, 1897 – March 6, 1981) was an American football coach. He was the second head football coach at Abilene Christian University in Abilene, Texas and he held that position for the 1920 season. His coaching record at Abilene Christian was 4–0–1.

== Head coaching record ==
Year	Team	Overall	Conference	Standing	Bowl/playoffs
Abilene Christian (Independent) (1920)
1920	Abilene Christian	4–0–1			
Abilene Christian:		4–0–1			
Total:		4–0–1			
