= 1920 Oglethorpe Stormy Petrels football team =

American college football season

1920 Oglethorpe Stormy Petrels football
- Conference: Independent
- Record: 4–4–1
- Head coach: Jogger Elcock (1st season)
- Captain: Johnny Knox
- Home stadium: Oglethorpe University Field

1920 Southern college football independents records
	Conf.			Overall
Team	W	L	T	W		L		T
Talladega		–		?	–	0	–	0
Trinity (NC)		–		4	–	0	–	1
Abilene Christian		–		4	–	0	–	1
North Texas State Normal		–		7	–	1	–	0
Presbyterian		–		5	–	1	–	1
Middle Tennessee State Normal		–		4	–	1	–	0
Navy		–		6	–	2	–	0
Spring Hill		–		6	–	2	–	0
Birmingham–Southern		–		6	–	3	–	0
Mississippi Normal		–		4	–	2	–	1
Southwest Texas State		–		4	–	2	–	1
East Tennessee State Normal		–		3	–	2	–	0
West Virginia		–		5	–	4	–	1
Oglethorpe		–		4	–	4	–	1
Delaware		–		3	–	5	–	1
Stetson		–		2	–	4	–	0
Texas Mines		–		2	–	4	–	0
Marion		–		2	–	5	–	0
Wake Forest		–		2	–	7	–	0
Sam Houston Normal		–		1	–	4	–	2
Western Kentucky State Normal		–		0	–	1	–	0
West Tennessee State Normal		–		0	–	5	–	0
Marshall		–		0	–	8	–	0

The 1920 Oglethorpe Stormy Petrels football team represented Oglethorpe University in the sport of American football during the 1920 college football season. This was one of the first of Oglethorpe's seasons with a grown up program; they joined the Southern Intercollegiate Athletic Association after the season. Oglethorpe proved itself against some of the toughest opponents. Despite a loss to Georgia Tech, Oglethorpe was still able to boast that it was the only team to hold Tech from scoring on their touchdown line and were able to make a stop. Other impressive games were wins over Florida and Mercer.

The season marked the first under Jogger Elcock, who retained Kirby Malone as an assistant coach from the previous year. Johnny Knox was the team captain.

== Schedule ==
Date	Opponent	Site	Result	Attendance	Source
September 25	North Georgia	Atlanta, GA	W 63–0		
October 2	at Georgia Tech	Grant Field; Atlanta, GA	L 0–55	6,000	
October 9	at Chattanooga	Chamberlain Field; Chattanooga, TN	T 14–14		
October 15	Sewanee	Ponce de Leon Park; Atlanta, GA	L 14–21		
October 23	Georgia	Ponce de Leon Park; Atlanta, GA	L 3–27		
October 29	Wofford	Ponce de Leon Park; Atlanta, GA	W 14–0		
November 6	at Furman	Manly Field; Greenville, SC	L 42–3		
November 13	at Mercer	Central City Park; Macon, GA	W 42–0		
November 25	vs. Florida	Memorial Stadium; Columbus, GA	W 21–0		
