= 1920 Mississippi Normal Normalites football team =

American college football season

1920 Mississippi Normal Normalites football
- Conference: Independent
- Record: 4–2–1
- Head coach: B. B. O'Mara (1st season)
- Home stadium: Kamper Park

1920 Southern college football independents records
	Conf.			Overall
Team	W	L	T	W		L		T
Talladega		–		?	–	0	–	0
Trinity (NC)		–		4	–	0	–	1
Abilene Christian		–		4	–	0	–	1
North Texas State Normal		–		7	–	1	–	0
Presbyterian		–		5	–	1	–	1
Middle Tennessee State Normal		–		4	–	1	–	0
Navy		–		6	–	2	–	0
Spring Hill		–		6	–	2	–	0
Birmingham–Southern		–		6	–	3	–	0
Mississippi Normal		–		4	–	2	–	1
Southwest Texas State		–		4	–	2	–	1
East Tennessee State Normal		–		3	–	2	–	0
West Virginia		–		5	–	4	–	1
Oglethorpe		–		4	–	4	–	1
Delaware		–		3	–	5	–	1
Stetson		–		2	–	4	–	0
Texas Mines		–		2	–	4	–	0
Marion		–		2	–	5	–	0
Wake Forest		–		2	–	7	–	0
Sam Houston Normal		–		1	–	4	–	2
Western Kentucky State Normal		–		0	–	1	–	0
West Tennessee State Normal		–		0	–	5	–	0
Marshall		–		0	–	8	–	0

The 1920 Mississippi Normal Normalites football team was an American football team that represented Mississippi Normal College (now known as the University of Southern Mississippi) as an independent during the 1920 college football season. In their first year under head coach B. B. O'Mara, the team compiled a 4–2–1 record.

== Schedule ==
Date	Opponent	Site	Result	Source
October 2	Perkinston High School	Kamper Park; Hattiesburg, MS	W 64–0	
October 9	Ole Miss	Kamper Park; Hattiesburg, MS	L 0–54	
October 16	Millsaps	Kamper Park; Hattiesburg, MS	T 7–7	
October 23	at Spring Hill High School	Mobile, AL	W 12–2	
November 11	Tulane freshmen	Kamper Park; Hattiesburg, MS	L 0–19	
November 20	Mississippi Industrial Training	Kamper Park; Hattiesburg, MS	W 27–0	
November 25	Gulf Coast Military Academy	Kamper Park; Hattiesburg, MS	W 40–0	
