= 1920 Birmingham–Southern Panthers football team =

American college football season

1920 Birmingham–Southern Panthers football
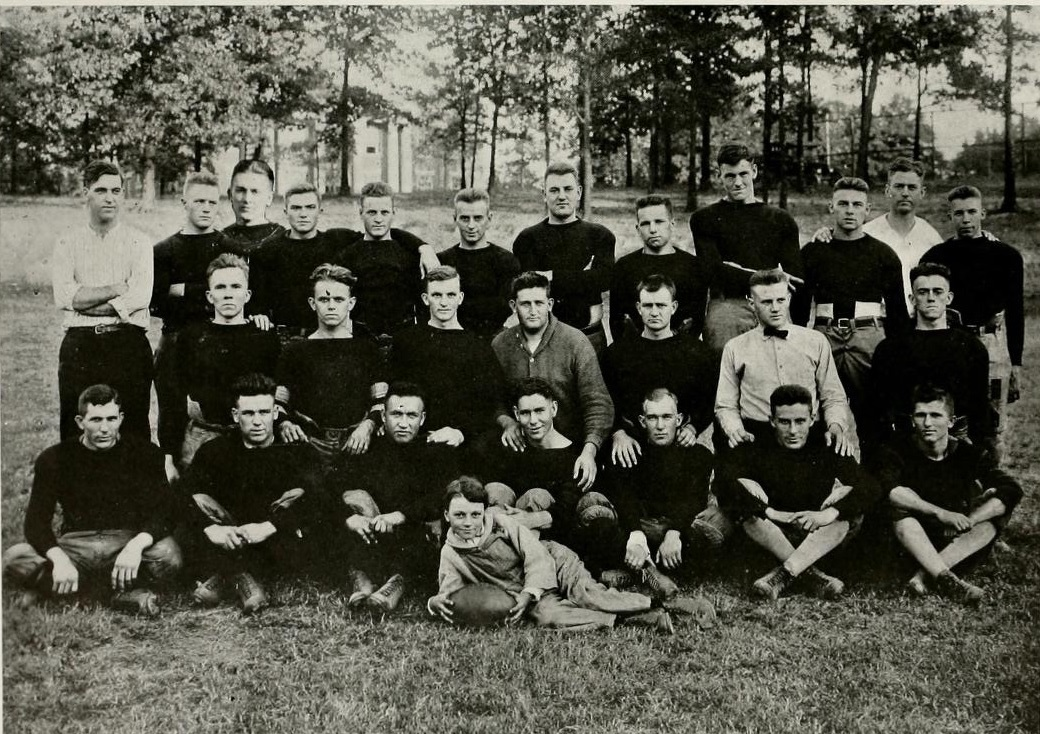
- Conference: Independent
- Record: 6–3
- Head coach: Charles H. Brown (2nd season)
- Home stadium: Munger Field

1920 Southern college football independents records
	Conf.			Overall
Team	W	L	T	W		L		T
Talladega		–		?	–	0	–	0
Trinity (NC)		–		4	–	0	–	1
Abilene Christian		–		4	–	0	–	1
North Texas State Normal		–		7	–	1	–	0
Presbyterian		–		5	–	1	–	1
Middle Tennessee State Normal		–		4	–	1	–	0
Navy		–		6	–	2	–	0
Spring Hill		–		6	–	2	–	0
Birmingham–Southern		–		6	–	3	–	0
Mississippi Normal		–		4	–	2	–	1
Southwest Texas State		–		4	–	2	–	1
East Tennessee State Normal		–		3	–	2	–	0
West Virginia		–		5	–	4	–	1
Oglethorpe		–		4	–	4	–	1
Delaware		–		3	–	5	–	1
Stetson		–		2	–	4	–	0
Texas Mines		–		2	–	4	–	0
Marion		–		2	–	5	–	0
Wake Forest		–		2	–	7	–	0
Sam Houston Normal		–		1	–	4	–	2
Western Kentucky State Normal		–		0	–	1	–	0
West Tennessee State Normal		–		0	–	5	–	0
Marshall		–		0	–	8	–	0

The 1920 Birmingham–Southern Panthers football team was an American football team that represented Birmingham–Southern College as an independent during the 1920 college football season. In their second season under head coach Charles H. Brown, the team compiled a 6–3 record.

== Schedule ==
Date	Opponent	Site	Result	Source
September 25	Hamilton (AL)	Munger Field; Birmingham, AL	W 47–0	
October 2	at Vanderbilt	Dudley Field; Nashville, TN	L 0–54	
October 9	at Alabama	Denny Field; Tuscaloosa, AL	L 0–45	
October 16	Ole Miss	Rickwood Field; Birmingham, AL	W 27–6	
October 22	at Marion	Selma, AL	W 17–6	
October 29	Spring Hill	Rickwood Field; Birmingham, AL	W 20–13	
November 6	vs. Auburn	Gunter Park; Montgomery, AL	L 0–49	
November 12	Chattanooga	Munger Field; Birmingham, AL	W 27–0	
November 20	at Howard (AL)	Rickwood Field; Birmingham, AL	W 14–7	
