= Bryan Morse =

American journalist

Biographical details
- Born: August 21, 1885; Washington, D.C., U.S.
- Died: January 23, 1939 (aged 53); Washington, D.C., U.S.

Playing career

Football
- 1907–1908: Clarkson
- 1909: George Washington

Coaching career (HC unless noted)

Football
- 1920: George Washington

Basketball
- 1920–1923: George Washington

Track
- 1914–1920: George Washington

Head coaching record
- Overall: 1–6–1 (football); 16–27 (basketball)

Bryan Woodward Morse (August 21, 1885 – January 23, 1939) was an American football, basketball, and track coach at George Washington University in Washington, D.C. He was later a sportswriter and hunting and finishing columnist for The Washington Herald. Morse died on January 23, 1939, in Washington, D.C.

== Head coaching record ==
=== Football ===
Year	Team	Overall	Conference	Standing	Bowl/playoffs
George Washington Hatchetites (South Atlantic Intercollegiate Athletic Association) (1920)
1920	George Washington	1–6–1	0–1	T–11th	
George Washington:		1–6–1	0–1		
Total:		1–6–1			
