= Phil Utley =

American sports coach (1889–1950)

Biographical details
- Born: October 23, 1889
- Died: June 16, 1950 (aged 60); Los Angeles, California, U.S.

Playing career

Football
- 1909–1912: Wake Forest

Basketball
- 1909–1913: Wake Forest

Baseball
- 1910–1913: Wake Forest
- 1913–1914: Rome Romans
- Positions: Quarterback, end (football); Guard (basketball); First baseman (baseball); Hurder, shot putter (track)

Coaching career (HC unless noted)

Football
- 1913: Carson–Newman
- 1921: Lenoir

Basketball
- 1921–1922: Lenoir
- 1922–1923: Wake Forest

Baseball
- 1922: Lenoir
- 1923: Wake Forest

Administrative career (AD unless noted)
- 1922–1923: Wake Forest

Head coaching record
- Overall: 9–5 (football); 20–17 (basketball); 18–17 (baseball)

Philemon McGee Utley (October 23, 1889 – June 16, 1950) was an American football, basketball, baseball, and track coach. He served as the head football coach at Carson–Newman University in 1913 and Lenoir College—now known as Lenoir–Rhyne University—in 1921, compiling a career college football coaching record of 9–5. He coached the Wake Forest University men's basketball team in 1922–23 and the Demon Deacons baseball team in 1923. Utley also coached track at Wake Forest and served as the school athletic director in 1922–23.

A native of Raleigh, North Carolina, Utley attended Wake Forest from 1909 to 1913, where he played football as a quarterback and end, basketball as a guard, and baseball as a first baseman. He was also a hurdler and shot putter in track. Utley died unexpectedly on June 16, 1950, in Los Angeles, California.
