= Jimmy Leech =

American football player (1897–1951)

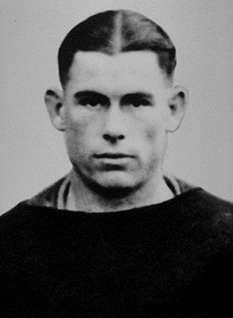
- Leech c. 1920

Profile
- Position: Halfback

Personal information
- Born: April 13, 1897; Collierville, Virginia
- Died: August 16, 1951 (aged 54); Hamden, Connecticut, U.S.
- Listed height: 5 ft 8 in (1.73 m)
- Listed weight: 155 lb (70 kg)

Career information
- College: VMI (1917–1920)

Awards and highlights
- SAIAA champion (1920); Third-team All-American (1920)
- College Football Hall of Fame (Class of 1956)

Jimmy Leech (April 13, 1897 – August 16, 1951) was an American college football player. He was elected to the College Football Hall of Fame in 1956. Leech starred on the undefeated 1920 VMI Keydets football team, leading the nation in scoring. He is considered one of the greatest to ever play for the school.

== VMI ==
He was a prominent running back for the VMI Keydets football team of the Virginia Military Institute.

=== 1920 ===
In 1920, Leech was selected third-team All-American by Walter Camp. On the All-Southern team's neglecting of Leech, one writer asks "Is Virginia in the South? If so, any judge that fails to put Jimmy Leach (sic), of V. M. I., on an All-Southern eleven is worse than crazy. Leach was a better football player than Flowers, of Georgia Tech, or McMillan, of Centre. He was easily the greatest back in the South, unsurpassed anywhere. He could kick, pass, crash through a line, or circle an end. In the nine game he played he scored 210 points, including twenty-six touchdowns. He carried the ball for 1,723 yards and hurled forward passes for 48 yards. He made seven runs from fifty to eighty-five yards, several against Pennsylvania. He is one of the greatest broken field runners the country has ever seen."

== See also ==
- List of NCAA major college football yearly scoring leaders
