= James L. White (coach) =

American college football player, baseball and basketball coach (1893–1949)

- Cavalier football player James White at Virginia's Lambeth Field in 1916

Biographical details
- Born: January 12, 1893; Memphis, Tennessee, U.S.
- Died: December 10, 1949 (aged 56)

Playing career

Football
- 1913–1916: Virginia

Basketball
- 1915–1917: Virginia

Baseball
- 1914–1917: Virginia
- Position: End

Coaching career (HC unless noted)

Football
- 1919: Virginia (assistant)
- 1920–1921: Wake Forest

Basketball
- 1920–1921: Wake Forest
- 1923–1925: Florida

Baseball
- 1917: Virginia
- 1920: Virginia
- 1921: Wake Forest
- 1925: Florida

Administrative career (AD unless noted)
- 1920–1921: Wake Forest
- 1923–1925: Florida

Head coaching record
- Overall: 4–15 (football); 14–27 (basketball); 31–21–4 (baseball)

James Livingston White Jr. (January 12, 1893 – December 10, 1949) was an American college baseball, basketball and football head coach for three different Southern universities, the University of Virginia, Wake Forest College and the University of Florida, in the 1910s and 1920s. He also served as the athletic director for Wake Forest and Florida.

== Early life and education ==
White was born in Memphis, Tennessee in 1893. UVA sources claim he spent time in Macon, Georgia. He attended the University of Virginia in Charlottesville, Virginia, where he played for the Virginia football team from 1913 to 1916, the Virginia baseball team from 1914 to 1917. and the Virginia basketball team from 1915 to 1917. The 1914 and 1915 Virginia teams claim regional titles. He graduated from Virginia with a bachelor's degree. During the First World War, he played for the 1917 Camp Gordon football team.

== Coaching career ==
White coached the University of Virginia baseball team while he was an undergraduate in 1917, and again in 1920. In two seasons as his alma mater's head baseball coach, he compiled a win–loss–tie record of 13–9–1.

In the fall of 1920, White became the athletic director for Wake Forest College, then located in Wake County, North Carolina. He also served as the head coach of the Wake Forest Fighting Baptists football team in 1920 and 1921, the Fighting Baptists basketball team from 1920 to 1921, and the Fighting Baptists baseball team in 1921. He compiled win–loss records of 4–15 in football, 7–10 in men's basketball, and 15–5–3 in baseball. He resigned in December 1921.

In 1923, White accepted the athletic director position at the University of Florida in Gainesville, Florida. While at Florida, he also coached the Florida Gators basketball team from 1923 to 1925, the Gators track and field team in 1924, and the Gators baseball team in 1925. During his stints as coach, he led the Gators basketball team to a 7–17 record in two seasons, and the Gators baseball team to 3–6 in a single season.

== Cavalier football tradition ==
White's son, James L. White, III, also played college football for the Virginia Cavaliers from 1939 to 1941, and graduated from the University of Virginia in 1942.

White died December 10, 1949; he was 56 years old.

== Head coaching record ==
=== Football ===
Year	Team	Overall	Conference	Standing	Bowl/playoffs
Wake Forest Baptists (Independent) (1920–1921)
1920	Wake Forest	2–7			
1921	Wake Forest	2–8			
Wake Forest:		4–15			
Total:		4–15			

=== Basketball ===
Record table
Season	Team	Overall	Conference	Standing	Postseason
Wake Forest Baptists (Independent) (1920–1921)
1920–21	Wake Forest	7–10			
Wake Forest:		7–10			
Florida Gators (Southern Conference) (1923–1925)
1923–24	Florida	5–10			
1924–25	Florida	2–7			
Florida:		7–17			
Total:		14–27			

=== Baseball ===
Record table
Season	Team	Overall	Conference	Standing	Postseason
Virginia Cavaliers (Independent) (1917–1920)
1917	Virginia	2–2			
1920	Virginia	11–7–1			
Virginia:		13–9–1			
Wake Forest Baptists (Independent) (1921)
1921	Wake Forest	15–5–3			
Wake Forest:		15–5–3			
Florida Gators (Southern Conference) (1925)
1925	Florida	3–6			
Florida:		3–6			
Total:		31–21–4			
