= Sheldon Fitts =

American football player (1899–1985)

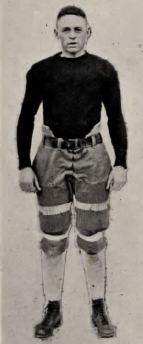
- Fitts, c. 1920

No. 31 – Georgia Bulldogs
- Positions: Quarterback, halfback

Personal information
- Born: November 1, 1899; Jemison, Alabama, U.S.
- Died: October 26, 1985 (aged 85); Marion, Alabama, U.S.

Career information
- High school: Georgia Military College
- College: Georgia (1920)

Awards and highlights
- SIAA Championship (1920)

Sheldon Fitts (November 1, 1899 – October 26, 1985) was an American college football player and lawyer.

== Biography ==
Fitts was born in 1899 in Jemison, Alabama. He prepped at Georgia Military College in Milledgeville. Fitts had a half-sister, author Mary Ward Brown.

Fitts played as a quarterback and halfback for the Georgia Bulldogs of the University of Georgia, a member of the "ten second backfield" (Note: The term "ten second backfield" generally refers to players capable (or thought to be capable) of running a 100-yard dash in 10 seconds—that is, fast runners.) of 1920. Fitts caught the pass to beat Furman and starred in the 56–0 win over Florida.

While at Georgia, Fitts was also a member of the Sigma Chi fraternity, and played as a center fielder on the Bulldogs baseball team. He was awarded varsity letters in both football and baseball. Georgia lists Fitts as only earning a football letter for the 1920 season, with contemporary newspaper reports from the 1921 season noting that he was unable to play due to a knee injury. While he was reported to have returned to the team in October 1922, there are no contemporary accounts of him playing again for Georgia.

Fitts went on to become an attorney. At the time of his death in 1985, he was a resident of Marion, Alabama. He was survived by a son, Sheldon Jr., and predeceased by his wife, Frances, who died in 1984.
