= 1920 LSU Tigers football team =

American college football season

1920 LSU Tigers football
- Conference: Southern Intercollegiate Athletic Association
- Record: 5–3–1 (1–3 SIAA)
- Head coach: Branch Bocock (1st season)
- Captain: Roy L. Benoit
- Home stadium: State Field

1920 Southern Intercollegiate Athletic Association football standings
	Conf.					Overall
Team	W		L		T	W		L		T
Georgia +	7	–	0	–	0	8	–	0	–	1
Tulane +	5	–	0	–	0	6	–	2	–	1
Georgia Tech +	4	–	0	–	0	8	–	1	–	0
Alabama	6	–	1	–	0	10	–	1	–	0
Centre	4	–	1	–	0	8	–	2	–	0
Furman	3	–	1	–	0	9	–	1	–	0
South Carolina	3	–	1	–	0	5	–	4	–	0
Tennessee	5	–	2	–	0	7	–	2	–	0
Auburn	4	–	2	–	0	7	–	2	–	0
Mississippi A&M	4	–	2	–	0	5	–	3	–	0
Sewanee	3	–	3	–	1	4	–	3	–	1
Vanderbilt	3	–	3	–	0	4	–	3	–	1
Transylvania	2	–	2	–	0	3	–	4	–	0
Howard (AL)	2	–	3	–	0	3	–	5	–	1
Mississippi College	2	–	4	–	0	3	–	5	–	0
Florida	1	–	2	–	0	6	–	3	–	0
Clemson	2	–	6	–	0	4	–	6	–	1
LSU	1	–	3	–	0	5	–	3	–	1
Chattanooga	1	–	3	–	0	3	–	4	–	1
The Citadel	1	–	4	–	0	2	–	6	–	0
Ole Miss	0	–	2	–	0	4	–	3	–	0
Kentucky	0	–	3	–	1	3	–	4	–	1
Georgetown (KY)	0	–	2	–	0	0	–	3	–	0
Millsaps	0	–	3	–	0	0	–	3	–	0
Mercer	0	–	4	–	0	2	–	6	–	0
Wofford	0	–	4	–	0	0	–	8	–	1
+ – Conference co-champions

The 1920 LSU Tigers football team represented the University of Louisiana (now known as Louisiana State University or LSU) as a member of the Southern Intercollegiate Athletic Association (SIAA) during the 1920 college football season. Led by first-year head coach Branch Bocock, the Tigers compiled an overall record of 5–3–1, with a mark of 1–3 in conference play, and finished tied for 18th in the SIAA. LSU played home games at State Field in Baton Rouge, Louisiana.

== Schedule ==
Date	Opponent	Site	Result	Source
October 2	Jefferson (LA)*	State Field; Baton Rouge, LA	W 81–0	
October 2	Louisiana Normal*	State Field; Baton Rouge, LA	W 34–0	
October 9	Spring Hill*	State Field; Baton Rouge, LA	W 40–0	
October 15	at Texas A&M*	Kyle Field; College Station, TX (rivalry)	T 0–0	
October 23	Mississippi A&M	State Field; Baton Rouge, LA (rivalry)	L 7–12	
October 30	Mississippi College	State Field; Baton Rouge, LA	W 41–9	
November 6	vs. Arkansas*	Fair Grounds; Shreveport, LA (rivalry)	W 3–0	
November 13	Alabama	Denny Field; Tuscaloosa, AL (rivalry)	L 0–21	
November 25	Tulane	State Field; Baton Rouge, LA (rivalry)	L 0–21	
*Non-conference game
