= Dave Collings =

American football player

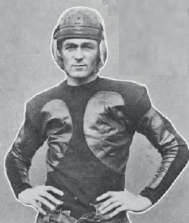
- Collings, c. 1922

No. 5 – Georgia Bulldogs
- Position: Halfback / Punter

Personal information
- Born: November 4, 1901; Atlanta, Georgia, U.S.
- Died: December 8, 1982 (aged 81)

Career information
- High school: Boys High School (Atlanta)
- College: Georgia (1919–1922)

Awards and highlights
- SIAA Championship (1920, 1921)

David Ayres Collings Jr. (Note: His middle name appears in some sources as "Ayers".) (November 4, 1901 – December 8, 1982) was an American college football player. He played four seasons with the Georgia Bulldogs, 1919–1922.

== Biography ==
Collings was born in Atlanta in 1901. He attended Boys High School there, and played on the football team.

Collings was a four-year letterman, 1919–1922, for the Georgia Bulldogs. He was primarily a halfback and punter, and was part of the team's "ten second backfield" (Note: The term "ten second backfield" generally refers to players capable (or thought to be capable) of running a 100-yard dash in 10 seconds—that is, fast runners.) in 1920. He made a 40-yard drop kick against South Carolina that season, and in the 7–0 defeat of Furman, a punting duel between Collings and Milton McManaway featured throughout. In 1922, Collings started the game against Vanderbilt at quarterback. In recounting his senior season, Georgia's yearbook listed him as an end and quarterback, and noted that he "rounded out his four years as a varsity back in a bright red cloak of glory." He was a member of Chi Phi fraternity.

In 1924, sportswriter Morgan Blake included Collings as one of the two halfbacks in his selection of the greatest football players from Atlanta.

As of November 1933, Collings was a district manager for The Coca-Cola Company, and he was still employed by the company as of February 1942. He apparently spent several years in the late 1930s living in Dallas. Collings died in December 1982.
