= 1920 Mississippi College Collegians football team =

American college football season

1920 Mississippi College Collegians football
- Conference: Southern Intercollegiate Athletic Association
- Record: 3–5 (2–4 SIAA)
- Head coach: Stanley L. Robinson (1st season)
- Home stadium: Provine Field

1920 Southern Intercollegiate Athletic Association football standings
| | Conf. | | | | | Overall |
| Team | W | | L | | T | W | | L | | T |
|---|---|---|---|---|---|---|---|---|---|---|
| Georgia + | 7 | – | 0 | – | 0 | 8 | – | 0 | – | 1 |
| Tulane + | 5 | – | 0 | – | 0 | 6 | – | 2 | – | 1 |
| Georgia Tech + | 4 | – | 0 | – | 0 | 8 | – | 1 | – | 0 |
| Alabama | 6 | – | 1 | – | 0 | 10 | – | 1 | – | 0 |
| Centre | 4 | – | 1 | – | 0 | 8 | – | 2 | – | 0 |
| Furman | 3 | – | 1 | – | 0 | 9 | – | 1 | – | 0 |
| South Carolina | 3 | – | 1 | – | 0 | 5 | – | 4 | – | 0 |
| Tennessee | 5 | – | 2 | – | 0 | 7 | – | 2 | – | 0 |
| Auburn | 4 | – | 2 | – | 0 | 7 | – | 2 | – | 0 |
| Mississippi A&M | 4 | – | 2 | – | 0 | 5 | – | 3 | – | 0 |
| Sewanee | 3 | – | 3 | – | 1 | 4 | – | 3 | – | 1 |
| Vanderbilt | 3 | – | 3 | – | 0 | 4 | – | 3 | – | 1 |
| Transylvania | 2 | – | 2 | – | 0 | 3 | – | 4 | – | 0 |
| Howard (AL) | 2 | – | 3 | – | 0 | 3 | – | 5 | – | 1 |
| Mississippi College | 2 | – | 4 | – | 0 | 3 | – | 5 | – | 0 |
| Florida | 1 | – | 2 | – | 0 | 6 | – | 3 | – | 0 |
| Clemson | 2 | – | 6 | – | 0 | 4 | – | 6 | – | 1 |
| LSU | 1 | – | 3 | – | 0 | 5 | – | 3 | – | 1 |
| Chattanooga | 1 | – | 3 | – | 0 | 3 | – | 4 | – | 1 |
| The Citadel | 1 | – | 4 | – | 0 | 2 | – | 6 | – | 0 |
| Ole Miss | 0 | – | 2 | – | 0 | 4 | – | 3 | – | 0 |
| Kentucky | 0 | – | 3 | – | 1 | 3 | – | 4 | – | 1 |
| Georgetown (KY) | 0 | – | 2 | – | 0 | 0 | – | 3 | – | 0 |
| Millsaps | 0 | – | 3 | – | 0 | 0 | – | 3 | – | 0 |
| Mercer | 0 | – | 4 | – | 0 | 2 | – | 6 | – | 0 |
| Wofford | 0 | – | 4 | – | 0 | 0 | – | 8 | – | 1 |
+ – Conference co-champions

The 1920 Mississippi College Collegians football team was an American football team that represented Mississippi College as a member of the Southern Intercollegiate Athletic Association (SIAA) during the 1920 college football season. In their first year under head coach Stanley L. Robinson, the team compiled a 3–5 record.

Mississippi College was scheduled to play Ole Miss on Thanksgiving at Jackson. After the Rebels canceled, the Collegians scheduled a road game at Spring Hill as a replacement contest.

== Schedule ==
| Date | Opponent | Site | Result | Source |
|---|---|---|---|---|
| October 2 | at Mississippi A&M | Scott Field; Starkville, MS | L 0–27 | |
| October 9 | at Tulane | Tulane Stadium; New Orleans, LA | L 0–29 | |
| October 16 | at Alabama | Denny Field; Tuscaloosa, AL | L 0–57 | |
| October 23 | Ouachita Baptist* | Provine Field; Clinton, MS | W 6–0 | |
| October 30 | at LSU | State Field; Baton Rouge, LA | L 9–41 | |
| November 5 | at Howard (AL) | Rickwood Field; Birmingham, AL | W 21–7 | |
| November 11 | vs. Millsaps | Mississippi State Fair; Jackson, MS (rivalry) | W 60–0 | |
| November 25 | at Spring Hill* | Monroe Park; Mobile, AL | L 20–21 | |
*Non-conference game
