= 1920 Southern Intercollegiate Athletic Association football season =

- League: NCAA
- Sport: College football
- Duration: September 23, 1920 through January 1, 1921
- Teams: 25

Regular Season
- Season champions: Georgia Tech; Georgia; Tulane

Football seasons
- ← 1919 1921 →

1920 Southern Intercollegiate Athletic Association football standings
	Conf.					Overall
Team	W		L		T	W		L		T
Georgia +	7	–	0	–	0	8	–	0	–	1
Tulane +	5	–	0	–	0	6	–	2	–	1
Georgia Tech +	4	–	0	–	0	8	–	1	–	0
Alabama	6	–	1	–	0	10	–	1	–	0
Centre	4	–	1	–	0	8	–	2	–	0
Furman	3	–	1	–	0	9	–	1	–	0
South Carolina	3	–	1	–	0	5	–	4	–	0
Tennessee	5	–	2	–	0	7	–	2	–	0
Auburn	4	–	2	–	0	7	–	2	–	0
Mississippi A&M	4	–	2	–	0	5	–	3	–	0
Sewanee	3	–	3	–	1	4	–	3	–	1
Vanderbilt	3	–	3	–	0	4	–	3	–	1
Transylvania	2	–	2	–	0	3	–	4	–	0
Howard (AL)	2	–	3	–	0	3	–	5	–	1
Mississippi College	2	–	4	–	0	3	–	5	–	0
Florida	1	–	2	–	0	6	–	3	–	0
Clemson	2	–	6	–	0	4	–	6	–	1
LSU	1	–	3	–	0	5	–	3	–	1
Chattanooga	1	–	3	–	0	3	–	4	–	1
The Citadel	1	–	4	–	0	2	–	6	–	0
Ole Miss	0	–	2	–	0	4	–	3	–	0
Kentucky	0	–	3	–	1	3	–	4	–	1
Georgetown (KY)	0	–	2	–	0	0	–	3	–	0
Millsaps	0	–	3	–	0	0	–	3	–	0
Mercer	0	–	4	–	0	2	–	6	–	0
Wofford	0	–	4	–	0	0	–	8	–	1
+ – Conference co-champions

The 1920 Southern Intercollegiate Athletic Association football season was the college football games played by the member schools of the Southern Intercollegiate Athletic Association as part of the 1920 college football season. The season began on September 23 with conference member Auburn hosting the Marion Military Institute.

Georgia and Georgia Tech both claim conference championships with undefeated records, as would Tulane. Clyde Berryman retroactively selected Georgia as a national champion.

== Regular season ==
Index to colors and formatting
Non-conference matchup; SIAA member won
Non-conference matchup; SIAA member lost
Non-conference matchup; tie
Conference matchup

SIAA teams in bold.

=== Week One ===
Date	Visiting team	Home team	Site	Result	Attendance	Reference
September 23	Marion	**Auburn**	Drake Field • Auburn, Alabama	**W** 27–0		
September 24	Erskine	**Clemson**	Riggs Field • Calhoun, South Carolina	**W** 26–0		
September 24	**Howard**	Morgan		**T** 0–0		
September 25	Southern Military Academy	**Alabama**	Denny Field • Tuscaloosa, Alabama	**W** 59–0		
September 25	Elon	**Furman**	Manly Field • Greenville, South Carolina	**W** 33–0		
September 25	Wake Forest	**Georgia Tech**	Grant Field • Atlanta	**W** 44–0		
September 25	Emory & Henry	**Tennessee**	Waite Field • Knoxville, Tennessee	**W** 45–0		

=== Week Two ===
Date	Visiting team	Home team	Site	Result	Attendance	Reference
October 1	Jefferson	LSU	State Field • Baton Rouge, Louisiana	**W** 81–0		
October 1	Presbyterian	Clemson	Riggs Field • Calhoun, South Carolina	**T** 7–7		
October 2	Marion	Alabama	Denny Field • Tuscaloosa, Alabama	**W** 49–0		
October 2	**Howard**	Auburn	Drake Field • Auburn, Alabama	**AUB** 88–0		
October 2	Newberry	Clemson	Riggs Field • Calhoun, South Carolina	**W** 26–6		
October 2	Erskine	Furman	Manly Field • Greenville, South Carolina	**W** 41–0		
October 2	**The Citadel**	Georgia	Sanford Field • Athens, Georgia	**UGA** 40–0		
October 2	Oglethorpe	Georgia Tech	Grant Field • Atlanta	**W** 55–0		
October 2	Rhodes	Kentucky	Stoll Field • Lexington, Kentucky	**W** 62–0		
October 2	Northwestern St.	LSU	State Field • Baton Rouge, Louisiana	**W** 34–0		
October 2	Lanier	Mercer	Macon, Georgia	**W** 59–0		
October 2	**Mississippi College**	Mississippi A&M	Scott Field • Starkville, Mississippi	**MSA&M** 27–0		
October 2	**Wofford**	South Carolina	Columbia, South Carolina	**SCAR** 10–0		
October 2	Bryson	Sewanee	McGee Field • Sewanee, Tennessee	**W** 7–0		
October 2	Maryville	Tennessee	Waite Field • Knoxville, Tennessee	**W** 34–0		
October 2	Louisiana-Lafayette	Tulane	Second Tulane Stadium • New Orleans	**W** 6–0		
October 2	Birmingham–Southern	Vanderbilt	Dudley Field • Nashville, Tennessee	**W** 54–0		
October 2	Tusculum	Chattanooga	Knoxville, Tennessee	**W** 21–0		

=== Week Three ===
Date	Visiting team	Home team	Site	Result	Attendance	Reference
October 9	Birmingham–Southern	**Alabama**	Denny Field • Tuscaloosa, Alabama	**W** 45–0		
October 9	Fort Benning	**Auburn**	Drake Field • Auburn, Alabama	**W** 14–2		
October 9	**Howard**	Centre	Cheek Field • Danville, Kentucky	**L** 120–0		
October 9	**Wofford**	**Clemson**	Riggs Field • Calhoun, South Carolina	**CLEM** 13–7		
October 9	**Furman**	**The Citadel**	College Park Stadium • Charleston, South Carolina	**FUR** 21–6		
October 9	**Georgia**	**South Carolina**	Columbia, South Carolina	**UGA** 37–0		
October 9	Davidson	**Georgia Tech**	Grant Field • Atlanta	**W** 66–0		
October 9	Newberry	**Florida**	Fleming Field • Gainesville, Florida	**W** 21–0		
October 9	Maryville	**Kentucky**	Stoll Field • Lexington, Kentucky	**W** 31–0		
October 9	**Mississippi College**	**Tulane**	Second Tulane Stadium • New Orleans	**TUL** 29–0		
October 9	**Chattanooga**	Oglethorpe		**T** 14–14		
October 9	Spring Hill	**LSU**	State Field • Baton Rouge, Louisiana	**W** 40–0		
October 9	**Mercer**	Stetson	DeLand, Florida	**W** 19–6		
October 9	**Georgetown**	**Sewanee**	McGee Field • Sewanee, Tennessee	**SEW** 54–0		
October 9	**Vanderbilt**	**Tennessee**	Waite Field • Knoxville, Tennessee	**VAN** 20–0		

=== Week Four ===
Date	Visiting team	Home team	Site	Result	Attendance	Reference
October 13	**Georgia**	**Furman**	Manly Field • Greenville, South Carolina	**UGA** 7–0		
October 15	**Auburn**	**Clemson**	Riggs Field • Calhoun, South Carolina	**AUB** 21–0		
October 15	**Wofford**	Newberry	• Newberry, South Carolina	**L** 9–7		
October 16	**Mississippi College**	**Alabama**	Denny Field • Tuscaloosa, Alabama	**ALA** 57–0		
October 16	**Ole Miss**	Birmingham–Southern	Birmingham, Alabama	**L** 27–6		
October 16	**Georgia Tech**	**Vanderbilt**	Dudley Field • Nashville, Tennessee	**GT** 44–0		
October 16	Centre	**Transylvania**	• Lexington, Kentucky	**L** 55–0		
October 16	**Mercer**	**Howard**		**HOW** 33–13		
October 16	**Sewanee**	Oglethorpe	Brookhaven, Georgia	**W** 21–13		
October 16	Texas A&M	**LSU**	State Field • Baton Rouge, Louisiana	**T** 0–0		
October 16	**Tennessee**	**Chattanooga**	Chamberlain Field • Chattanooga, Tennessee	**TENN** 35–0		
October 16	**South Carolina**	North Carolina	Chapel Hill, North Carolina	**L** 7-0		
October 16	Southern Military Academy	**Mississippi A&M**	Scott Field • Starkville, Mississippi	**W** 14–13		
October 16	**Kentucky**	Miami	Oxford, Ohio	**L** 14–0		
October 16	**Tulane**	Rice	Rice Field • Houston, Texas	**T** 0–0		
October 16	**The Citadel**	VMI	Lynchburg, Virginia	**L** 35–0		

=== Week Five ===
Date	Visiting team	Home team	Site	Result	Attendance	Reference
October 23	Presbyterian	**South Carolina**	Augusta, Georgia	**W** 14–0		
October 23	**Howard**	**Alabama**	Denny Field • Tuscaloosa, Alabama	**ALA** 33–0		
October 23	**Vanderbilt**	**Auburn**	Rickwood Field • Birmingham, Alabama	**AUB** 56–6		
October 23	**Mercer**	**Chattanooga**	Chamberlain Field • Chattanooga, Tennessee	**CHAT** 20–0		
October 23	**Wofford**	**The Citadel**	College Park Stadium • Charleston, South Carolina	**CIT** 19–0		
October 23	Florida Southern	**Florida**	Fleming Field • Gainesville, Florida	**W** 13–0		
October 23	Wake Forest	**Furman**	Manly Field • Greenville, South Carolina	**W** 17–0		
October 23	**Georgia**	Oglethorpe	Brookhaven, Georgia	**W** 27–3		
October 23	**Mississippi A&M**	**LSU**	State Field • Baton Rouge, Louisiana	**MSA&M** 12–7		
October 23	Ouachita	**Mississippi College**	Clinton, Mississippi	**W** 6–0		
October 23	**Georgia Tech**	Pittsburgh	Forbes Field • Pittsburgh, Pennsylvania	**L** 10–3		
October 23	**Kentucky**	**Sewanee**	McGee Field • Sewanee, Tennessee	**T** 6–6		
October 23	**Clemson**	**Tennessee**	Waite Field • Knoxville, Tennessee	**TENN** 26–0		
October 23	**Tulane**	**Ole Miss**	Hemingway Stadium • Oxford, Mississippi	**TUL** 32–0		

=== Week Six ===
Date	Visiting team	Home team	Site	Result	Attendance	Reference
October 28	**Clemson**	**South Carolina**	Columbia, South Carolina	**SCAR** 3–0		
October 29	Marion	**Howard**		**W** 21–6		
October 29	**Mercer**	**Florida**	Valdosta, Georgia	**FLA** 30–0		
October 29	**Furman**	Newberry	Newberry, South Carolina	**W** 42–0		
October 29	**Wofford**	Oglethorpe	Brookhaven, Georgia	**L** 14–0		
October 30	Carson-Newman	**Chattanooga**	Chamberlain Field • Chattanooga, Tennessee	**W** 83–0		
October 30	**Auburn**	**Georgia**	McClung Stadium • Columbus, Georgia	**UGA** 7–0		
October 30	Centre	**Georgia Tech**	Grant Field • Atlanta	**W** 24–0		
October 30	**Sewanee**	**Alabama**	Rickwood Field • Birmingham, Alabama	**ALA** 21–0		
October 30	**Tulane**	Michigan	Ferry Field • Ann Arbor, Michigan	**L** 21–0		
October 30	**Mississippi College**	**LSU**	State Field • Baton Rouge, Louisiana	**LSU** 41–9		
October 30	**Tennessee**	**Mississippi A&M**	Scott Field • Starkville, Mississippi	**MSA&M** 13–7		
October 30	**Kentucky**	**Vanderbilt**	Dudley Field • Nashville, Tennessee	**VAN** 20–0		
October 30	**The Citadel**	Davidson	Charlotte, North Carolina	**L** 27–13		

=== Week Seven ===
Date	Visiting team	Home team	Site	Result	Attendance	Reference
November 6	**Vanderbilt**	**Alabama**	Rickwood Field • Birmingham, Alabama	**ALA** 14–7		
November 6	Birmingham–Southern	**Auburn**	Montgomery, Alabama	**W** 49–0		
November 6	Newberry	**The Citadel**	College Park Stadium • Charleston, South Carolina	**W** 35–10		
November 6	**Clemson**	**Georgia Tech**	Grant Field • Atlanta	**GT** 7–0		
November 6	**Georgia**	Virginia	Charlottesville, Virginia	**T** 0–0		
November 6	Oglethorpe	**Furman**	Manly Field • Greenville, South Carolina	**W** 42–3		
November 6	Gordon	**Mercer**	Macon, Georgia	**L** 14–0		
November 6	Cincinnati	**Kentucky**	Stoll Field • Lexington, Kentucky	**W** 7–6		
November 6	Arkansas	**LSU**	Shreveport, Louisiana	**W** 3–0		
November 6	**Howard**	**Mississippi College**	Clinton, Mississippi	**MSCOLL** 21–7		
November 6	**Ole Miss**	**Mississippi A&M**	Greenwood, Mississippi	**MSA&M** 20–0		
November 6	**Wofford**	Presbyterian	Clinton, South Carolina	**L** 13–0		
November 6	**Chattanooga**	**Sewanee**	McGee Field • Sewanee, Tennessee	**SEW** 33–0		
November 6	**Tulane**	**Florida**	Plant Field • Tampa, Florida	**TUL** 14–0		
November 6	**Transylvania**	**Tennessee**	Waite Field • Knoxville, Tennessee	**TENN** 49–0		
November 6	**South Carolina**	Davidson	Davidson, North Carolina	**L** 27-0		

=== Week Eight ===
Date	Visiting team	Home team	Site	Result	Attendance	Reference
November 11	**Clemson**	**The Citadel**	County Fairgrounds • Orangeburg, South Carolina	**CLEM** 26–0		
November 11	**Florida**	Stetson	Palatka, Florida	**W** 26–0		
November 12	**Chattanooga**	Birmingham–Southern	Birmingham, Alabama	**L** 27–0		
November 13	**Millsaps**	**Mississippi College**	Clinton, Mississippi	**MSCOLL** 60–0		
November 13	Centre	**Kentucky**	Stoll Field • Lexington, Kentucky	**L** 49–0		
November 13	**South Carolina**	Navy	Annapolis, Maryland	**L** 63–0		
November 13	Washington & Lee	**Auburn**	Rickwood Field • Birmingham, Alabama	**W** 77–0		
November 13	**Furman**	**Wofford**	Spartanburg, South Carolina	**FUR** 69–0		
November 13	Georgetown	**Georgia Tech**	Grant Field • Atlanta	**W** 35–6		
November 13	**Florida**	**Georgia**	Sanford Field • Athens, Georgia	**UGA** 56–0		
November 13	**Millsaps**	**Mississippi College**	Clinton, Mississippi	**MSCOLL** 56–0		
November 13	**LSU**	**Alabama**	Denny Field • Tuscaloosa, Alabama	**ALA** 21–0		
November 13	Oglethorpe	**Mercer**	Macon, Georgia	**L** 42–0		
November 13	**Tennessee**	**Sewanee**	McGee Field • Sewanee, Tennessee	**TENN** 20–0		
November 13	**Mississippi A&M**	**Tulane**	Second Tulane Stadium • New Orleans	**TUL** 6–0		
November 13	Middle Tennessee State	**Vanderbilt**	Dudley Field • Nashville, Tennessee	**W** 34–0		

=== Week Nine ===
Date	Visiting team	Home team	Site	Result	Attendance	Reference
November 20	Birmingham–Southern	**Howard**		**L** 14–7		
November 20	Newberry	**South Carolina**	Columbia, South Carolina	**W** 48-0		
November 20	Stetson	**Florida**	Fleming Field • Gainesville, Florida	**W** 21–0		
November 20	**Clemson**	**Furman**	Manly Field • Greenville, South Carolina	**FUR** 14–0		
November 20	**Alabama**	**Georgia**	Ponce de Leon Park • Atlanta	**UGA** 21–14		
November 20	Virginia	**Vanderbilt**	Dudley Field • Nashville, Tennessee	**T** 7–7		
November 20	Wake Forest Freshmen	**Mercer**	Macon, Georgia	**L** 14–0		
November 20	**Wofford**	NC State	Raleigh, North Carolina	**L** 90-7		

=== Week Ten ===
Date	Visiting team	Home team	Site	Result	Attendance	Reference
November 25	**Georgetown**	Centre	Cheek Field • Danville, Kentucky	**L** 103–0		
November 25	**Wofford**	Duke	Durham, North Carolina	**T** 0–0		
November 25	**Florida**	Oglethorpe	Columbus, Georgia	**L** 21–0		
November 25	**Auburn**	**Georgia Tech**	Grant Field • Atlanta	**GT** 34–0		
November 25	**Clemson**	**Georgia**	Athens, Georgia	**UGA** 55–0		
November 25	**Mississippi A&M**	**Alabama**	Rickwood Field • Birmingham, Alabama	**ALA** 24–7		
November 25	Davidson	**Furman**	Manly Field • Greenville, South Carolina	**W** 7–0		
November 25	**South Carolina**	**The Citadel**	College Park Stadium •Charleston, South Carolina	**SCAR** 7–6		
November 25	**Tulane**	**LSU**	State Field • Baton Rouge, Louisiana	**TUL** 21–0		
November 25	**Kentucky**	**Tennessee**	Waite Field • Knoxville, Tennessee	**TENN** 14–7		
November 27	**Alabama**	Case	Cleveland, Ohio	**W** 40–0		
November 27	**Mercer**	Erskine	Due West, South Carolina	**L** 20–6		
November 27	**Sewanee**	**Vanderbilt**	Dudley Field • Nashville, Tennessee	**VAN** 21–3		
November 28	**Millsaps**	**Howard**		**HOW** 42–0		

=== Week Eleven ===
Date	Visiting team	Home team	Site	Result	Attendance	Reference
December 4	Detroit Mercy	**Tulane**	Second Tulane Stadium • New Orleans	**L** 7–0		

== Awards and honors ==
=== All-Americans ===
- E – Bill Fincher, Georgia Tech (WC-1, LP-1 [as T])
- G – Dummy Lebey, Georgia Tech (LP-2)
- QB – Bo McMillin, Centre (FW; INS-3; WC-2; UP-2; WE-1; NEA-1; LP-2 [hb])
- HB – Buck Flowers, Georgia Tech (UP-3 [hb]; INS-3)

=== All-Southern team ===
The following includes the composite All-Southern eleven formed by the selection of 27 coaches and sporting writers culled by the Atlanta Constitution and Atlanta Journal.

Position	Name	First-team selectors	Team
QB	Bo McMillin	C	Centre
HB	Red Barron	C	Georgia Tech
HB	Buck Flowers	C	Georgia Tech
FB	Riggs Stephenson	C	Alabama
E	Owen Reynolds	C	Georgia
T	Bill Fincher	C	Georgia Tech
G	Fatty Warren	C	Auburn
C	Bum Day	C	Georgia
G	Noah Caton	C	Auburn
T	Artie Pew	C	Georgia
E	John Staton	C	Georgia Tech
