= 1920 Howard Bulldogs football team =

American college football season

1920 Howard Bulldogs football
- Conference: Southern Intercollegiate Athletic Association
- Record: 3–5–1 (2–3 SIAA)
- Head coach: Robert C. Marshall (1st season)
- Home stadium: Eagles Field; Rickwood Field

1920 Southern Intercollegiate Athletic Association football standings
| | Conf. | | | | | Overall |
| Team | W | | L | | T | W | | L | | T |
|---|---|---|---|---|---|---|---|---|---|---|
| Georgia + | 7 | – | 0 | – | 0 | 8 | – | 0 | – | 1 |
| Tulane + | 5 | – | 0 | – | 0 | 6 | – | 2 | – | 1 |
| Georgia Tech + | 4 | – | 0 | – | 0 | 8 | – | 1 | – | 0 |
| Alabama | 6 | – | 1 | – | 0 | 10 | – | 1 | – | 0 |
| Centre | 4 | – | 1 | – | 0 | 8 | – | 2 | – | 0 |
| Furman | 3 | – | 1 | – | 0 | 9 | – | 1 | – | 0 |
| South Carolina | 3 | – | 1 | – | 0 | 5 | – | 4 | – | 0 |
| Tennessee | 5 | – | 2 | – | 0 | 7 | – | 2 | – | 0 |
| Auburn | 4 | – | 2 | – | 0 | 7 | – | 2 | – | 0 |
| Mississippi A&M | 4 | – | 2 | – | 0 | 5 | – | 3 | – | 0 |
| Sewanee | 3 | – | 3 | – | 1 | 4 | – | 3 | – | 1 |
| Vanderbilt | 3 | – | 3 | – | 0 | 4 | – | 3 | – | 1 |
| Transylvania | 2 | – | 2 | – | 0 | 3 | – | 4 | – | 0 |
| Howard (AL) | 2 | – | 3 | – | 0 | 3 | – | 5 | – | 1 |
| Mississippi College | 2 | – | 4 | – | 0 | 3 | – | 5 | – | 0 |
| Florida | 1 | – | 2 | – | 0 | 6 | – | 3 | – | 0 |
| Clemson | 2 | – | 6 | – | 0 | 4 | – | 6 | – | 1 |
| LSU | 1 | – | 3 | – | 0 | 5 | – | 3 | – | 1 |
| Chattanooga | 1 | – | 3 | – | 0 | 3 | – | 4 | – | 1 |
| The Citadel | 1 | – | 4 | – | 0 | 2 | – | 6 | – | 0 |
| Ole Miss | 0 | – | 2 | – | 0 | 4 | – | 3 | – | 0 |
| Kentucky | 0 | – | 3 | – | 1 | 3 | – | 4 | – | 1 |
| Georgetown (KY) | 0 | – | 2 | – | 0 | 0 | – | 3 | – | 0 |
| Millsaps | 0 | – | 3 | – | 0 | 0 | – | 3 | – | 0 |
| Mercer | 0 | – | 4 | – | 0 | 2 | – | 6 | – | 0 |
| Wofford | 0 | – | 4 | – | 0 | 0 | – | 8 | – | 1 |
+ – Conference co-champions

The 1920 Howard Bulldogs football team was an American football team that represented Howard College (now known as the Samford University) as a member of the Southern Intercollegiate Athletic Association (SIAA) during the 1920 college football season. In their first year under head coach Robert C. Marshall, the team compiled a 3–5–1 record.

== Schedule ==
| Date | Opponent | Site | Result | Source |
|---|---|---|---|---|
| September 24 | Morgan School (TN)* | Eagles Field; Birmingham, AL | T 0–0 | |
| October 2 | at Auburn | Drake Field; Auburn, AL | L 0–88 | |
| October 9 | at Centre | Cheek Field; Danville, KY | L 0–120 | |
| October 16 | at Mercer | Central City Park; Macon, GA | W 33–13 | |
| October 23 | at Alabama | Denny Field; Tuscaloosa, AL | L 0–33 | |
| October 29 | Marion* | Eagles Field; Birmingham, AL | W 21–0 | |
| November 5 | Mississippi College | Rickwood Field; Birmingham, AL | L 7–21 | |
| November 20 | Birmingham–Southern*^{†} | Rickwood Field; Birmingham, AL | L 7–14 | |
| November 25 | at Millsaps | Jackson, MS | W 42–0 | |
*Non-conference game; ^{†}Homecoming
