= 1920 Mississippi A&M Aggies football team =

American college football season

1920 Mississippi A&M Aggies football
- Conference: Southern Intercollegiate Athletic Association
- Record: 5–3 (4–2 SIAA)
- Head coach: Ferdinand Holtkamp (1st season)
- Home stadium: Scott Field

1920 Southern Intercollegiate Athletic Association football standings
| | Conf. | | | | | Overall |
| Team | W | | L | | T | W | | L | | T |
|---|---|---|---|---|---|---|---|---|---|---|
| Georgia + | 7 | – | 0 | – | 0 | 8 | – | 0 | – | 1 |
| Tulane + | 5 | – | 0 | – | 0 | 6 | – | 2 | – | 1 |
| Georgia Tech + | 4 | – | 0 | – | 0 | 8 | – | 1 | – | 0 |
| Alabama | 6 | – | 1 | – | 0 | 10 | – | 1 | – | 0 |
| Centre | 4 | – | 1 | – | 0 | 8 | – | 2 | – | 0 |
| Furman | 3 | – | 1 | – | 0 | 9 | – | 1 | – | 0 |
| South Carolina | 3 | – | 1 | – | 0 | 5 | – | 4 | – | 0 |
| Tennessee | 5 | – | 2 | – | 0 | 7 | – | 2 | – | 0 |
| Auburn | 4 | – | 2 | – | 0 | 7 | – | 2 | – | 0 |
| Mississippi A&M | 4 | – | 2 | – | 0 | 5 | – | 3 | – | 0 |
| Sewanee | 3 | – | 3 | – | 1 | 4 | – | 3 | – | 1 |
| Vanderbilt | 3 | – | 3 | – | 0 | 4 | – | 3 | – | 1 |
| Transylvania | 2 | – | 2 | – | 0 | 3 | – | 4 | – | 0 |
| Howard (AL) | 2 | – | 3 | – | 0 | 3 | – | 5 | – | 1 |
| Mississippi College | 2 | – | 4 | – | 0 | 3 | – | 5 | – | 0 |
| Florida | 1 | – | 2 | – | 0 | 6 | – | 3 | – | 0 |
| Clemson | 2 | – | 6 | – | 0 | 4 | – | 6 | – | 1 |
| LSU | 1 | – | 3 | – | 0 | 5 | – | 3 | – | 1 |
| Chattanooga | 1 | – | 3 | – | 0 | 3 | – | 4 | – | 1 |
| The Citadel | 1 | – | 4 | – | 0 | 2 | – | 6 | – | 0 |
| Ole Miss | 0 | – | 2 | – | 0 | 4 | – | 3 | – | 0 |
| Kentucky | 0 | – | 3 | – | 1 | 3 | – | 4 | – | 1 |
| Georgetown (KY) | 0 | – | 2 | – | 0 | 0 | – | 3 | – | 0 |
| Millsaps | 0 | – | 3 | – | 0 | 0 | – | 3 | – | 0 |
| Mercer | 0 | – | 4 | – | 0 | 2 | – | 6 | – | 0 |
| Wofford | 0 | – | 4 | – | 0 | 0 | – | 8 | – | 1 |
+ – Conference co-champions

The 1920 Mississippi A&M Aggies football team was an American football team that represented the Agricultural and Mechanical College of the State of Mississippi (now known as Mississippi State University) as a member of the Southern Intercollegiate Athletic Association (SIAA) during the 1920 college football season. In their first season under head coach Ferdinand Holtkamp, Mississippi A&M compiled a 5–3 record.

== Schedule ==
| Date | Opponent | Site | Result | Source |
|---|---|---|---|---|
| October 2 | Mississippi College | Scott Field; Starkville, MS | W 27–0 | |
| October 9 | at Indiana* | Jordan Field; Bloomington, IN | L 0–24 | |
| October 16 | Southern Military Academy* | Scott Field; Starkville, MS | W 33–0 | |
| October 23 | at LSU | State Field; Baton Rouge, LA (rivalry) | W 12–7 | |
| October 30 | Tennessee | Scott Field; Starkville, MS | W 13–7 | |
| November 6 | vs. Ole Miss | Greenwood, MS (rivalry) | W 20–0 | |
| November 13 | at Tulane | Second Tulane Stadium; New Orleans, LA | L 0–6 | |
| November 25 | at Alabama | Rickwood Field; Birmingham, AL (rivalry) | L 7–24 | |
*Non-conference game
