= 1920 Tulane Green Wave football team =

American college football season

1920 Tulane Green Wave football
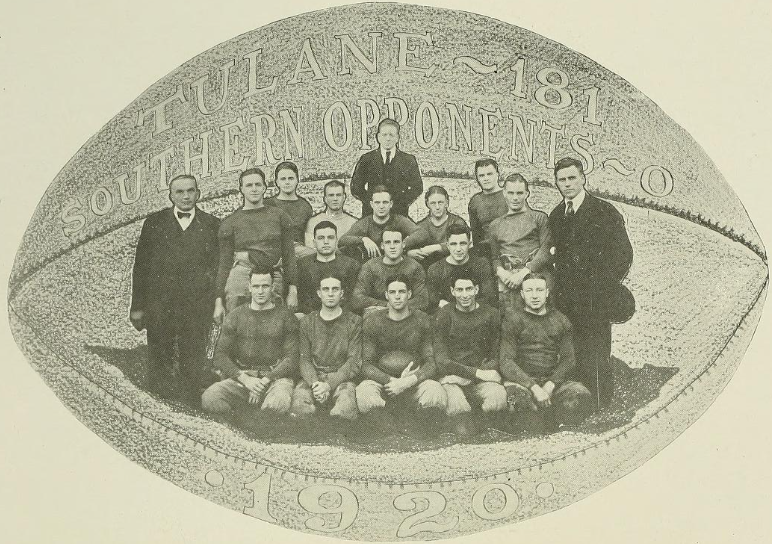

SIAA co-champion
- Conference: Southern Intercollegiate Athletic Association
- Record: 6–2–1 (5–0 SIAA)
- Head coach: Clark Shaughnessy (6th season)
- Offensive scheme: Single wing
- Captain: Johnny Wight
- Home stadium: Second Tulane Stadium

1920 Southern Intercollegiate Athletic Association football standings
	Conf.					Overall
Team	W		L		T	W		L		T
Georgia +	7	–	0	–	0	8	–	0	–	1
Tulane +	5	–	0	–	0	6	–	2	–	1
Georgia Tech +	4	–	0	–	0	8	–	1	–	0
Alabama	6	–	1	–	0	10	–	1	–	0
Centre	4	–	1	–	0	8	–	2	–	0
Furman	3	–	1	–	0	9	–	1	–	0
South Carolina	3	–	1	–	0	5	–	4	–	0
Tennessee	5	–	2	–	0	7	–	2	–	0
Auburn	4	–	2	–	0	7	–	2	–	0
Mississippi A&M	4	–	2	–	0	5	–	3	–	0
Sewanee	3	–	3	–	1	4	–	3	–	1
Vanderbilt	3	–	3	–	0	4	–	3	–	1
Transylvania	2	–	2	–	0	3	–	4	–	0
Howard (AL)	2	–	3	–	0	3	–	5	–	1
Mississippi College	2	–	4	–	0	3	–	5	–	0
Florida	1	–	2	–	0	6	–	3	–	0
Clemson	2	–	6	–	0	4	–	6	–	1
LSU	1	–	3	–	0	5	–	3	–	1
Chattanooga	1	–	3	–	0	3	–	4	–	1
The Citadel	1	–	4	–	0	2	–	6	–	0
Ole Miss	0	–	2	–	0	4	–	3	–	0
Kentucky	0	–	3	–	1	3	–	4	–	1
Georgetown (KY)	0	–	2	–	0	0	–	3	–	0
Millsaps	0	–	3	–	0	0	–	3	–	0
Mercer	0	–	4	–	0	2	–	6	–	0
Wofford	0	–	4	–	0	0	–	8	–	1
+ – Conference co-champions

The 1920 Tulane Green Wave football team was an American football team that represented Tulane University as a member of the Southern Intercollegiate Athletic Association (SIAA) during the 1920 SIAA football season. In its sixth year under head coach Clark Shaughnessy, Tulane compiled a 6–2–1 record (5–0 in conference games), finished in a three-way tie for the SIAA championship, shut out seven of nine opponents, and outscored all opponents by a total of 181 to 28.

The team's two losses came in nonconference games, losing to Michigan (0–21) in Ann Arbor and Detroit (0–7) in New Orleans. The highlight of the season was a 21–0 victory over LSU on Thanksgiving Day. Hundreds of enthusiastic Tulane students and supporters were taken to Baton Rouge on a special train "said to be the longest ever assembled in the state."

End Dick White was the only Tulane player to receive honors on the 1920 All-Southern team. Right end Johnny Wight was the team captain.

The 1920 team was the first to be called the "Green Wave", named after a song titled "The Rolling Green Wave".

The team played its home games at Tulane Stadium in New Orleans.

== Before the season ==
In the prior year of 1919, coach Clark Shaughnessy guided Tulane to a then-school record of seven consecutive wins, and had transformed Tulane into a competitor among Southern collegiate teams.

Though he was famous for later using the T formation, at Tulane Shaughnessy employed the single wing. Shaughnessy also introduced to Tulane the Minnesota shift, an innovation created by his former coach Henry L. Williams.

Germany Schulz was hired to take over duties as athletic director.

== Schedule ==
Date	Opponent	Site	Result	Attendance	Source
October 2	Southwestern Louisiana*	Tulane Stadium; New Orleans, LA	W 79–0		
October 9	Mississippi College	Tulane Stadium; New Orleans, LA	W 29–0		
October 16	Rice*	Heinemann Park; New Orleans, LA	T 0–0		
October 23	Ole Miss	Tulane Stadium; New Orleans, LA (rivalry)	W 32–0		
October 30	at Michigan*	Ferry Field; Ann Arbor, MI	L 21–0	13,000	
November 6	vs. Florida	Plant Field; Tampa, FL	W 14–0		
November 13	Mississippi A&M	Tulane Stadium; New Orleans, LA	W 6–0		
November 25	at LSU	State Field; Baton Rouge, LA (Battle for the Rag)	W 21–0		
December 4	Detroit*	Tulane Stadium; New Orleans, LA	L 7–0		
*Non-conference game

== Game summaries ==
=== Southwestern Louisiana ===
The season opened with a 79–0 victory over Southwestern Louisiana. One full quarter was played by the substitutes.

=== Mississippi College ===
The Mississippi College Choctaws and Goat Hale fell to Tulane 29–0.

=== Rice ===
Rice at Tulane

Team	1	2	3	4	Total
Rice	0	0	0	0	0
Tulane	0	0	0	0	0

- Date: October 16
- Location: Heinemann Park
  New Orleans, LA

The Rice Owls fought Tulane to a scoreless tie in a game shifted to Heinemann Park.

On Oct. 20, 1920, Earl Sparling, the editor of the Tulane Hullabaloo, wrote a football song which was printed in the newspaper. The song was titled "The Rolling Green Wave." Although the name was not immediately adopted, it began to receive acceptance.

=== Ole Miss ===
Tulane beat Ole Miss, 32–0. Coach Shaughnessy introduced a new shift in the first half, and the players had trouble implementing it. By the second period, Tulane played conventional football instead.

=== Michigan ===
The season's first loss was 21–0 to the Michigan Wolverines in Ann Arbor, succumbing to the northern foes by the second half.

=== Florida ===
Tulane at Florida

Team	1	2	3	4	Total
• Tulane	0	0	7	7	14
Florida	0	0	0	0	0

- Date: November 6
- Location: Plant Field
  Tampa, FL
- Referee: Ham Dowling

In Tampa, Tulane beat the Florida Gators 14–0. Florida's Tootie Perry played one of the best games seen in Tampa. Dwyer went over right tackle for the first touchdown. After B. Brown cut loose for a 30-yard run, Richcoon scored the last.

The starting lineup was Beaulau (left end), Unsworth (left tackle), Fitz (left guard), Reed (center), Killinger (right guard), Payne (right tackle), Wight (right end), Richeson (quarterback), Dwyer (left halfback), Brown (right halfback), McGraw (fullback).

=== Mississippi A&M ===
Mississippi A&M at Tulane

Team	1	2	3	4	Total
Miss. A&M	0	0	0	0	0
• Tulane	0	6	0	0	6

- Date: November 13
- Location: Tulane Stadium
  New Orleans, LA
- Referee: C. W. Streit

In what the yearbook called "the critical game of the season," Tulane won 6–0 over the Mississippi Aggies. Both teams were previously unbeaten. The feature of the contest twas Johnny Wight's punt returns, which set up the game's only score.

The starting lineup was Weigan (left end), Payne (left tackle), Fit (left guard), Reed (Center), Bellieu (left guard), Palermo (right tackle), Wight (right end), Richeson (quarterback), Dwyer (left halfback), Brown (right halfback), Smith (fullback).

=== LSU ===
Tulane triumphed 21–0 over rival LSU. The starting lineup was Wiegand (left end), Payne (left tackle), Fitz (left guard), Reed (center), Unsworth (right guard), Beallieu (right tackle), Wight (right end), Richeson (quarterback), Dwyer (left halfback), Brown (right halfback), Smith (fullback).

=== Detroit ===
Detroit at Tulane

Team	1	2	3	4	Total
• Detroit	7	0	0	0	7
Tulane	0	0	0	0	0

- Date: December 4
- Location: New Orleans, LA
- Referee: Walter Eckersall

On a muddy field, the Detroit Titans beat Tulane 7–0. Detroit opened up with passes early, leading to Lauer's off tackle touchdown. The starting lineup was Smith (left end), Payne (left tackle), Unsworth (left guard), Reed (center), Palermo (right guard), Fitz (right tackle), Wight (right end), Richeson (quarterback), Brown (left halfback), Dwyer (right halfback), Beaullieu (fullback).

== Players ==
=== Line ===
Player	Position	Games started	Hometown	Prep school	Height	Weight	Age
Gaston Beaullieu	end						
Fits Fitz	guard						
Killinger	guard						
Palermo	tackle						
Virgil Payne	tackle						
Eddie Reed	center		New Orleans, Louisiana	Spring Hill College			
Bennie Smith	end and fullback						
Johnny Unsworth	tackle						
Bob Wiegand	end						
Dicky Wight	end						
Johnny Wight	right end						

=== Backfield ===
Player	Position	Games started	Hometown	Prep school	Height	Weight	Age
Bennie Brown	right halfback						
Bill Dwyer	halfback						
Paul Maloney	quarter and fullback						
Forres McGraw	fullback						
Pinkie Nagle	halfback						
Harold Quinn	quarter and fullback						
Lyle Richeson	quarterback						
