= 1920 Alabama Crimson Tide football team =

American college football season

1920 Alabama Crimson Tide football
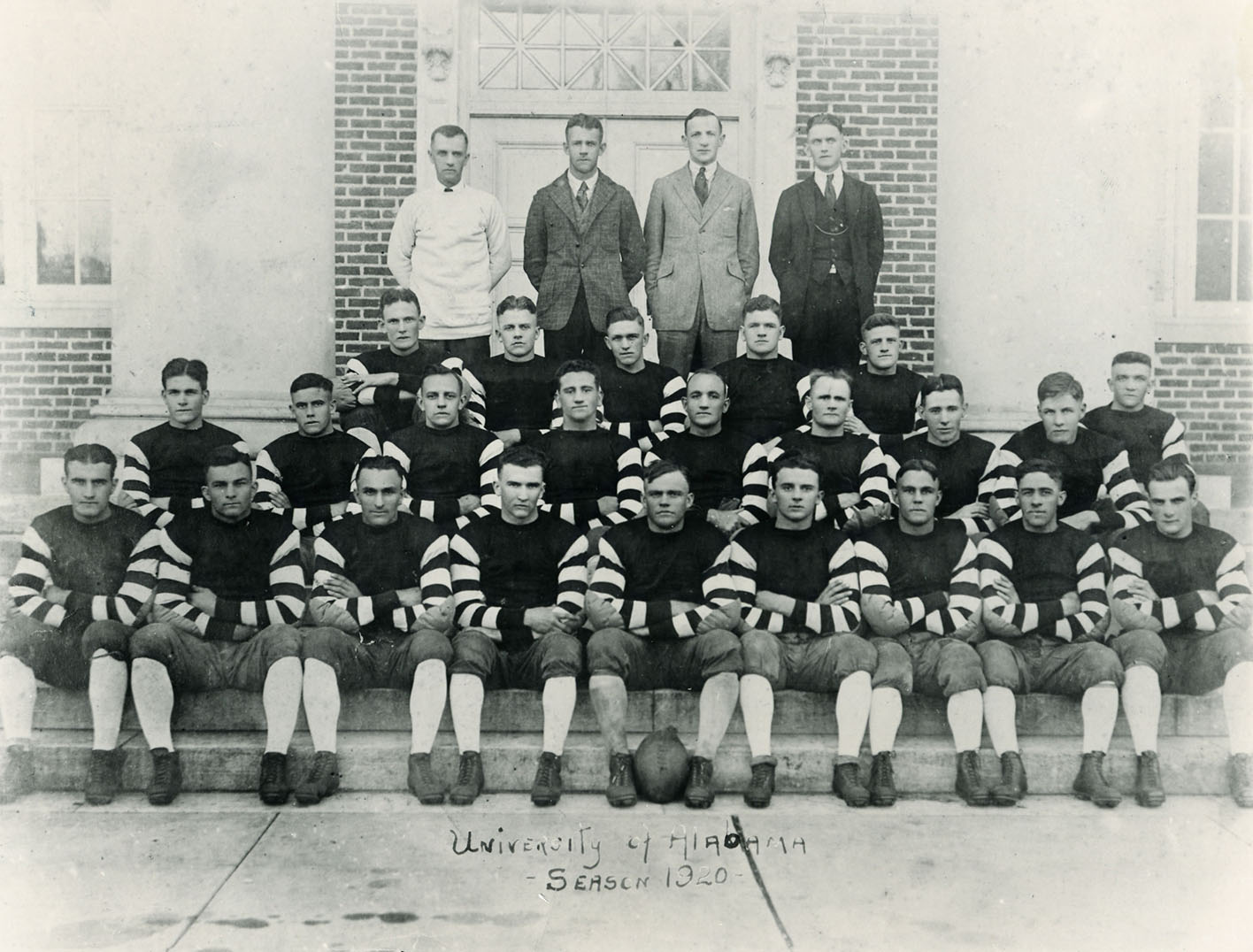
- Conference: Southern Intercollegiate Athletic Association
- Record: 10–1 (6–1 SIAA)
- Head coach: Xen C. Scott (2nd season)
- Captain: Sidney Johnston
- Home stadium: University/Denny Field; Rickwood Field

1920 Southern Intercollegiate Athletic Association football standings
	Conf.					Overall
Team	W		L		T	W		L		T
Georgia +	7	–	0	–	0	8	–	0	–	1
Tulane +	5	–	0	–	0	6	–	2	–	1
Georgia Tech +	4	–	0	–	0	8	–	1	–	0
Alabama	6	–	1	–	0	10	–	1	–	0
Centre	4	–	1	–	0	8	–	2	–	0
Furman	3	–	1	–	0	9	–	1	–	0
South Carolina	3	–	1	–	0	5	–	4	–	0
Tennessee	5	–	2	–	0	7	–	2	–	0
Auburn	4	–	2	–	0	7	–	2	–	0
Mississippi A&M	4	–	2	–	0	5	–	3	–	0
Sewanee	3	–	3	–	1	4	–	3	–	1
Vanderbilt	3	–	3	–	0	4	–	3	–	1
Transylvania	2	–	2	–	0	3	–	4	–	0
Howard (AL)	2	–	3	–	0	3	–	5	–	1
Mississippi College	2	–	4	–	0	3	–	5	–	0
Florida	1	–	2	–	0	6	–	3	–	0
Clemson	2	–	6	–	0	4	–	6	–	1
LSU	1	–	3	–	0	5	–	3	–	1
Chattanooga	1	–	3	–	0	3	–	4	–	1
The Citadel	1	–	4	–	0	2	–	6	–	0
Ole Miss	0	–	2	–	0	4	–	3	–	0
Kentucky	0	–	3	–	1	3	–	4	–	1
Georgetown (KY)	0	–	2	–	0	0	–	3	–	0
Millsaps	0	–	3	–	0	0	–	3	–	0
Mercer	0	–	4	–	0	2	–	6	–	0
Wofford	0	–	4	–	0	0	–	8	–	1
+ – Conference co-champions

The 1920 Alabama Crimson Tide football team (variously "Alabama", "UA" or "Bama") represented the University of Alabama in the 1920 Southern Intercollegiate Athletic Association football season. It was the Crimson Tide's 27th overall and 24th season as a member of the Southern Intercollegiate Athletic Association (SIAA). The team was led by head coach Xen C. Scott, in his second year, and played their home games at University/Denny Field in Tuscaloosa and at Rickwood Field in Birmingham, Alabama. They finished the season with a record of ten wins and one loss (10–1 overall, 6–1 in the SIAA). This marked the first ten win season in the history of Alabama football. Starting with Scott, every Alabama coach has won ten games in a season at least once, with the exception of Jennings B. Whitworth.

Alabama opened the season with six consecutive shutout victories over the Southern Military Academy, Marion, Birmingham–Southern, Mississippi College, Howard, and Sewanee. In their seventh game against Vanderbilt Alabama allowed its first touchdown of the season, but won 14–7 after the Commodores threw an interception on a fourth and goal from the three-yard line in the fourth quarter.

After their shutout victory over LSU on what was the first homecoming game played at Alabama, the Crimson Tide lost their only game of the season at Atlanta against Georgia. The Bulldogs did not score on offense but won 21–14 after touchdowns were scored on a fumble return, a blocked punt return and a blocked field goal return. The loss snapped Alabama's then school-record 11-game winning streak. Alabama won their final two games against Mississippi A&M and in Cleveland at Case and finished the season 10–1.

== Schedule ==
Date	Opponent	Site	Result	Attendance	Source
September 25	Southern Military Academy*	University Field; Tuscaloosa, AL	W 59–0		
October 2	Marion*	University Field; Tuscaloosa, AL	W 49–0		
October 9	Birmingham–Southern*	Denny Field; Tuscaloosa, AL	W 45–0		
October 16	Mississippi College	Denny Field; Tuscaloosa, AL	W 57–0		
October 23	Howard (AL)	Denny Field; Tuscaloosa, AL	W 33–0		
October 30	Sewanee	Rickwood Field; Birmingham, AL	W 21–0	6,000	
November 6	Vanderbilt	Rickwood Field; Birmingham, AL	W 14–7		
November 11	LSU^{†}	Denny Field; Tuscaloosa, AL (rivalry)	W 21–0		
November 20	at Georgia	Ponce de Leon Park; Atlanta, GA (rivalry)	L 14–21	12,000	
November 25	Mississippi A&M	Rickwood Field; Birmingham, AL (rivalry)	W 24–7		
November 27	at Case*	Van Horn Field; Cleveland, OH	W 40–0	1,000	
*Non-conference game; ^{†}Homecoming

== Before the season ==
After an 8–1 campaign in Scott's first season as head coach at Alabama, the Crimson Tide were viewed as a potential championship team by the media as they entered the 1920 season. During the week of September 12, Alabama held its first scrimmages of the season. At that time, Scott noted his team was much "heavier" that in the previous year and he also divided the squad into initial first and second teams. The "A" squad was coached by Scott and the "B" squad was coached by athletic director Charles A. Bernier. Prior to their opening game against the Southern Military Academy on September 23, Scott announced his starting lineup for the 1920 season. Additionally at that time, right guard Sidney Johnston was selected as season captain by his teammates.

== Game summaries ==
=== Southern Military Academy ===
Team	1	2	3	4	Total
SMA	0	0	0	0	0
• Alabama	7	13	20	19	59

- Date: September 25
- Location: University Field
  Tuscaloosa, AL

Alabama opened the 1920 season at Tuscaloosa with a 59–0 shutout over the Southern Military Academy (SMA) in the only game ever played between the schools. After a slow start that saw Alabama only up by a touchdown after the first quarter, the Crimson Tide scored an additional eight touchdowns and won the game going away. Mullie Lenoir scored five and both Luke Sewell and Riggs Stephenson scored a pair of touchdowns in the victory. Defensively, the Crimson Tide did not allow SMA a single first down in the game.

=== Marion ===
Team	1	2	3	4	Total
Marion	0	0	0	0	0
• Alabama	0	14	14	21	49

- Date: October 2
- Location: University Field
  Tuscaloosa, AL

Against Marion, Alabama defeated the Cadets 49–0 at Tuscaloosa for their second consecutive shutout to open the season. The Crimson Tide opened the game trying to utilize the forward pass, but were unsuccessful and held scoreless in the first quarter. They then returned to the running game for the duration of the game and scored 49 unanswered points in the victory. Touchdowns were scored by Mullie Lenoir three times, Ira Nichols twice and Al Clemens and J. T. O'Connor both scored once.

=== Birmingham–Southern ===
Team	1	2	3	4	Total
BSC	0	0	0	0	0
• Alabama	7	21	14	3	45

- Date: October 9
- Location: Denny Field
  Tuscaloosa, AL
- Referee: Randolph (Virginia)

Prior to the start of their game against Birmingham–Southern, University Field was officially rededicated as Denny Field in honor of then University president George H. Denny. Against the Panthers, the Crimson Tide won their third consecutive shutout, this time by a score of 45–0. Touchdowns were scored in the game twice by Mullie Lenoir and Ira Nichols and one by both J. T. O'Connor and Riggs Stephenson.

The starting lineup was Al Clemens (left end), T. L. Brown (left tackle), Sidney Johnston (left guard), Tram Sessions (center), Ben Hunt (right guard), Ernest Cooper (right tackle), Tom Newton (right end), Luke Sewell (quarterback), Mullie Lenoir (left halfback), Jack Hovater (right halfback), Riggs Stephenson (fullback).

=== Mississippi College ===
Against the Mississippi College Choctaws, the Crimson Tide won their fourth consecutive shutout, this time by a score of 57–0 at Tuscaloosa. In the game Mullie Lenoir and Riggs Stephenson each scored three touchdowns and Ira Nichols scored two.

=== Howard (AL) ===
Although both Sidney Johnston and Riggs Stephenson were out for their game against Howard (now known as Samford University), Alabama defeated the Bulldogs 33–0 at Tuscaloosa. In the game touchdowns were scored by Mullie Lenoir four times and by J. T. O'Connor once. Throughout the game, Alabama struggled to establish the passing game and fumbled the ball on several occasions.

=== Sewanee ===
Team	1	2	3	4	Total
Sewanee	0	0	0	0	0
• Alabama	0	7	7	7	21

- Date: October 30
- Location: Rickwood Field
  Birmingham, AL

In what was the most anticipated game of the season to that point, Alabama defeated the Sewanee Tigers 21–0 at Rickwood Field. In the first quarter, Alabama stopped a Sewanee scoring opportunity when J. T. O'Connor intercepted a Tigers' pass in the endzone. With the game scoreless, the Crimson Tide then took a 7–0 lead in the second quarter after Riggs Stephenson scored on a 12-yard run. In the third, Luke Sewell threw a long touchdown pass of 45-yards to Mullie Lenoir that extended their lead to 14–0. In the final period, Stephenson had a 60-yard interception return for a touchdown called back on a penalty, but then made the final score 21–0 with a long touchdown run on the drive that ensued.

In the game, Stephenson gained 286 and Lenoir gained 212 total yards. Alabama was also heavily penalized throughout the game that resulted in touchdown runs of 65 and 35-yards by Lenoir being nullified.

=== Vanderbilt ===
Team	1	2	3	4	Total
Vanderbilt	0	7	0	0	7
• Alabama	0	14	0	0	14

- Date: November 6
- Location: Rickwood Field
  Birmingham, AL

As they entered their game against Alabama, Vanderbilt had played seven consecutive, undefeated teams. Played at Birmingham, the University called a holiday and the entire school made the trip to Rickwood and saw Alabama defeat the Commodores 14–7 for their first victory over Vanderbilt in school history.

After a scoreless first, Alabama took a 14–0 second quarter lead on touchdown runs of four-yards by Riggs Stephenson and one-yard by Mullie Lenoir. Vanderbilt then responded with a short Doc Kuhn touchdown pass to Jess Neely that made the final score 14–7.

=== LSU ===
Team	1	2	3	4	Total
LSU	0	0	0	0	0
• Alabama	0	7	0	14	21

- Date: November 11
- Location: Denny Field
  Tuscaloosa, AL

On homecoming in Tuscaloosa, Alabama shutout the LSU Tigers 21–0 and extended their record to 8–0. After a scoreless first quarter, Alabama took a 7–0 lead in the second on an eight-yard J. T. O'Connor touchdown run. The score remained the same through the fourth quarter when the Crimson Tide score a pair of late touchdowns that made the final score 21–0. The first came on a 40-yard Walter Hovater pass to Mullie Lenoir and the second on a 12-yard O'Connor run. This also marked the first time the football team played a homecoming game at the University of Alabama.

=== Georgia ===
Team	1	2	3	4	Total
Alabama	0	7	7	0	14
• Georgia	14	0	0	7	21

- Date: November 20
- Location: Ponce de Leon Park
  Atlanta, GA
- Game attendance: 12,000

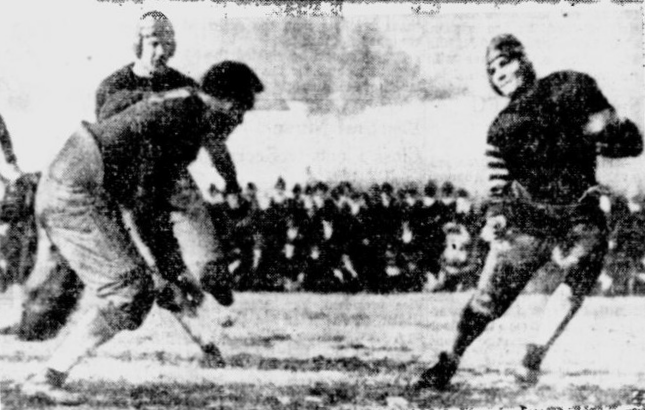
Georgia's Artie Pew is attempting to tackle Alabama's Riggs Stephenson.

After their road win over LSU, Alabama traveled to Atlanta where they lost their only game of the season to the Georgia Bulldogs 21–14. The game was unusual in that the Bulldogs did not score a single point on offense but rather scored touchdowns on a fumble return, a blocked punt return and a blocked field goal return. Georgia took a 14–0 lead in the first five minutes of play after they capitalized on a pair of Alabama mistakes. On the second offensive play of the game, Mullie Lenoir fumbled the ball and the Bulldogs' Paige Bennett returned it 45-yards for a touchdown and 7–0 lead. On the possession that followed, the Bulldogs' Hugh Whelchel blocked the J. T. O'Connor punt, Artie Pew recovered the ball and returned it 25-yards for a touchdown and extended the Georgia lead to 14–0.

Alabama tied the game 14–14 as they entered the fourth quarter after touchdowns were scored by Lenoir on a short run in the second and by Al Clemens on a Riggs Stephenson pass in the third quarter. With the game still tied late in the fourth, Alabama was to attempt a potential, game-winning 18-yard field goal. However, Buck Cheves blocked the attempt for the Bulldogs and returned it 82-yards for the game-winning touchdown.

=== Mississippi A&M ===
Team	1	2	3	4	Total
Mississippi A&M	0	0	7	0	7
• Alabama	0	14	3	7	24

- Date: November 25
- Location: Rickwood Field
  Birmingham, AL

In their final home game of the season, Alabama defeated the Mississippi A&M (now known as Mississippi State University) Aggies 24–7 on Thanksgiving at Rickwood Field. After a scoreless first, Alabama took a 14–0 halftime lead with a pair of second quarter touchdowns. The first came on a one-yard Ben Hunt run and the second on a six-yard Mullie Lenoir run. After P. M. Hough cut the lead in half for the Aggies with his one-yard touchdown run in the third, the Crimson Tide closed with ten unanswered points that made the final score 24–7. J. T. O'Connor scored first with his 25-yard field goal in the third and then Riggs Stephenson closed the game with an eight-yard touchdown run.

=== Case ===
Team	1	2	3	4	Total
• Alabama	7	7	7	19	40
Case	0	0	0	0	0

- Date: November 27
- Location: Van Horn Field
  Cleveland, OH
- Game attendance: 1,000

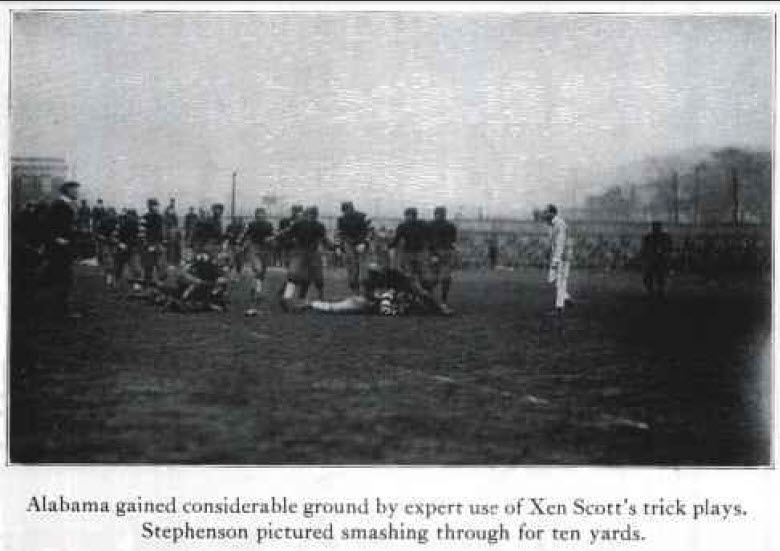
Case defense having difficulty stopping Riggs Stephenson while home in Cleveland.

On November 9, officials from both Case and Alabama agreed to play on the Saturday after Thanksgiving to close the 1920 season in what was the first time the Crimson Tide played a game in the North. The game came together as coach Scott previously coached at Case, worked for The Plain Dealer and wanted to showcase his team back in his Cleveland home. Played only two days after their win over Mississippi A&M, the Crimson Tide shutout the Scientists 40–0 in the only game between the schools, and captured the first ten-win season in school history.

Alabama brought only 17 players to Cleveland for the game that included two who were from the city and Riggs Stephenson who was expected to sign with baseball's Cleveland Indians. Mullie Lenoir scored first for Alabama on a 12-yard run in the first quarter for a 7–0 lead. In the second, Stephenson threw a 30-yard touchdown pass to Al Clemens that made the halftime score 14–0. After they extended their lead to 21–0 on a short Lenoir run in the third, the Crimson Tide closed the game with three fourth quarter touchdowns that made the final score 40–0. Stephenson was involved with all three scored with a pair scored by himself on short runs and the third on a second pass to Clemens.

== Personnel ==
=== Varsity letter winners ===
==== Line ====
Player	Hometown	Position	Games started	Prep school	Height	Weight	Age
T. L. Brown	Jasper, Alabama	Tackle					
C. T. Burkhart	Hanceville, Alabama	End					
Anthony Ray Florette	Cleveland, Ohio	End					
E. P. Hood	Birmingham, Alabama	Tackle					
Ben Hunt	Scottsboro, Alabama	Guard					
Sidney Johnston	Athens, Alabama	Guard					
William Milner Kelly	Birmingham, Alabama	End					
William Gabriel Montgomery	Birmingham, Alabama	Tackle					
Tom Newton	Birmingham, Alabama	End					
Manchester Paget	El Paso, Texas	Guard					
Harry Rowe	Elba, Alabama	Guard					
Tram Sessions	Birmingham, Alabama	Center					

==== Backfield ====
Player	Hometown	Position	Games started	Prep school	Height	Weight	Age
Charles Bartlett	Marlin, Texas	Halfback					
J. H. Emmett	Albertville, Alabama	Halfback					
Jack Hovater	Russellville, Alabama	Back				190	
Lelias E. Kirby	Albertville, Alabama	Halfback					
Mullie Lenoir	Marlin, Texas	Halfback				144	
Poc Little	Birmingham, Alabama	Fullback					
J. T. O'Connor	St. Louis, Missouri	Back					
Max Rosenfeld	Birmingham, Alabama	Quarterback			5'8"	175	
Luke Sewell	Titus, Alabama	Quarterback			5'9"	160	
Riggs Stephenson	Akron, Alabama	Fullback			5'10"	185	

=== Coaching staff ===
Name	Position	Seasons at Alabama	Alma mater
Xen C. Scott	Head coach	2	Western Reserve
Charles A. Bernier	Assistant coach	1	Hampden–Sydney
