= 1920 Kentucky Wildcats football team =

American college football season

1920 Kentucky Wildcats football
- Conference: Southern Intercollegiate Athletic Association
- Record: 3–4–1 (0–3–1 SIAA)
- Head coach: William Juneau (1st season)
- Captain: Eger V. Murphree
- Home stadium: Stoll Field

1920 Southern Intercollegiate Athletic Association football standings
	Conf.					Overall
Team	W		L		T	W		L		T
Georgia +	7	–	0	–	0	8	–	0	–	1
Tulane +	5	–	0	–	0	6	–	2	–	1
Georgia Tech +	4	–	0	–	0	8	–	1	–	0
Alabama	6	–	1	–	0	10	–	1	–	0
Centre	4	–	1	–	0	8	–	2	–	0
Furman	3	–	1	–	0	9	–	1	–	0
South Carolina	3	–	1	–	0	5	–	4	–	0
Tennessee	5	–	2	–	0	7	–	2	–	0
Auburn	4	–	2	–	0	7	–	2	–	0
Mississippi A&M	4	–	2	–	0	5	–	3	–	0
Sewanee	3	–	3	–	1	4	–	3	–	1
Vanderbilt	3	–	3	–	0	4	–	3	–	1
Transylvania	2	–	2	–	0	3	–	4	–	0
Howard (AL)	2	–	3	–	0	3	–	5	–	1
Mississippi College	2	–	4	–	0	3	–	5	–	0
Florida	1	–	2	–	0	6	–	3	–	0
Clemson	2	–	6	–	0	4	–	6	–	1
LSU	1	–	3	–	0	5	–	3	–	1
Chattanooga	1	–	3	–	0	3	–	4	–	1
The Citadel	1	–	4	–	0	2	–	6	–	0
Ole Miss	0	–	2	–	0	4	–	3	–	0
Kentucky	0	–	3	–	1	3	–	4	–	1
Georgetown (KY)	0	–	2	–	0	0	–	3	–	0
Millsaps	0	–	3	–	0	0	–	3	–	0
Mercer	0	–	4	–	0	2	–	6	–	0
Wofford	0	–	4	–	0	0	–	8	–	1
+ – Conference co-champions

The 1920 Kentucky Wildcats football team represented the University of Kentucky as a member of the Southern Intercollegiate Athletic Association (SIAA) during the 1920 college football season. Led by first-year head coach William Juneau, the Wildcats compiled an overall record of 3–4–1 with a mark of 0–3–1 in SIAA play.

== Schedule ==
Date	Opponent	Site	Result	Source
October 2	Southwestern Presbyterian*	Stoll Field; Lexington, KY	W 61–0	
October 9	Maryville (TN)*	Stoll Field; Lexington, KY	W 31–0	
October 16	at Miami (OH)*	Miami Field; Oxford, OH	L 0–14	
October 23	Sewanee	Stoll Field; Lexington, KY	T 6–6	
October 30	at Vanderbilt	Dudley Field; Nashville, TN (rivalry)	L 0–20	
November 6	Cincinnati*	Stoll Field; Lexington, KY	W 7–6	
November 13	Centre	Stoll Field; Lexington, KY (rivalry)	L 0–49	
November 25	at Tennessee	Waite Field; Knoxville, TN (rivalry)	L 7–14	
*Non-conference game
