= 1920 Mercer Baptists football team =

American college football season

1920 Mercer Baptists football
- Conference: Southern Intercollegiate Athletic Association
- Record: 2–6 (0–4 SIAA)
- Head coach: Josh Cody (1st season)
- Home stadium: Central City Park

1920 Southern Intercollegiate Athletic Association football standings
	Conf.					Overall
Team	W		L		T	W		L		T
Georgia +	7	–	0	–	0	8	–	0	–	1
Tulane +	5	–	0	–	0	6	–	2	–	1
Georgia Tech +	4	–	0	–	0	8	–	1	–	0
Alabama	6	–	1	–	0	10	–	1	–	0
Centre	4	–	1	–	0	8	–	2	–	0
Furman	3	–	1	–	0	9	–	1	–	0
South Carolina	3	–	1	–	0	5	–	4	–	0
Tennessee	5	–	2	–	0	7	–	2	–	0
Auburn	4	–	2	–	0	7	–	2	–	0
Mississippi A&M	4	–	2	–	0	5	–	3	–	0
Sewanee	3	–	3	–	1	4	–	3	–	1
Vanderbilt	3	–	3	–	0	4	–	3	–	1
Transylvania	2	–	2	–	0	3	–	4	–	0
Howard (AL)	2	–	3	–	0	3	–	5	–	1
Mississippi College	2	–	4	–	0	3	–	5	–	0
Florida	1	–	2	–	0	6	–	3	–	0
Clemson	2	–	6	–	0	4	–	6	–	1
LSU	1	–	3	–	0	5	–	3	–	1
Chattanooga	1	–	3	–	0	3	–	4	–	1
The Citadel	1	–	4	–	0	2	–	6	–	0
Ole Miss	0	–	2	–	0	4	–	3	–	0
Kentucky	0	–	3	–	1	3	–	4	–	1
Georgetown (KY)	0	–	2	–	0	0	–	3	–	0
Millsaps	0	–	3	–	0	0	–	3	–	0
Mercer	0	–	4	–	0	2	–	6	–	0
Wofford	0	–	4	–	0	0	–	8	–	1
+ – Conference co-champions

The 1920 Mercer Baptists football team was an American football team that represented Mercer University as a member of the Southern Intercollegiate Athletic Association (SIAA) during the 1920 college football season. In their first season under head coach Josh Cody, Mercer compiled a 2–7 record.

== Schedule ==
Date	Opponent	Site	Result	Source
October 1	Gordon Institute*	Central City Park; Macon, GA	L 0–14	
October 9	at Lanier*	Ponce de Leon Park; Atlanta, GA	W 59–0	
October 16	Howard (AL)	Central City Park; Macon, GA	L 13–33	
October 23	at Chattanooga	Chamberlain Field; Chattanooga, TN	L 0–20	
October 29	vs. Florida	Valdosta, GA	L 0–30	
November 5	at Stetson*	Deland, FL	W 19–6	
November 13	Oglethorpe	Central City Park; Macon, GA	L 0–42	
November 25	Erskine*	Central City Park; Macon, GA	L 6–20	
*Non-conference game
