= 1920 Auburn Tigers football team =

American college football season

1920 Auburn Tigers football
- Conference: Southern Intercollegiate Athletic Association
- Record: 7–2 (3–2 SIAA)
- Head coach: Mike Donahue (16th season)
- Base defense: 7–2–2
- Captain: Emmett Sizemore
- Home stadium: Drake Field; Rickwood Field

1920 Southern Intercollegiate Athletic Association football standings
	Conf.					Overall
Team	W		L		T	W		L		T
Georgia +	7	–	0	–	0	8	–	0	–	1
Tulane +	5	–	0	–	0	6	–	2	–	1
Georgia Tech +	4	–	0	–	0	8	–	1	–	0
Alabama	6	–	1	–	0	10	–	1	–	0
Centre	4	–	1	–	0	8	–	2	–	0
Furman	3	–	1	–	0	9	–	1	–	0
South Carolina	3	–	1	–	0	5	–	4	–	0
Tennessee	5	–	2	–	0	7	–	2	–	0
Auburn	4	–	2	–	0	7	–	2	–	0
Mississippi A&M	4	–	2	–	0	5	–	3	–	0
Sewanee	3	–	3	–	1	4	–	3	–	1
Vanderbilt	3	–	3	–	0	4	–	3	–	1
Transylvania	2	–	2	–	0	3	–	4	–	0
Howard (AL)	2	–	3	–	0	3	–	5	–	1
Mississippi College	2	–	4	–	0	3	–	5	–	0
Florida	1	–	2	–	0	6	–	3	–	0
Clemson	2	–	6	–	0	4	–	6	–	1
LSU	1	–	3	–	0	5	–	3	–	1
Chattanooga	1	–	3	–	0	3	–	4	–	1
The Citadel	1	–	4	–	0	2	–	6	–	0
Ole Miss	0	–	2	–	0	4	–	3	–	0
Kentucky	0	–	3	–	1	3	–	4	–	1
Georgetown (KY)	0	–	2	–	0	0	–	3	–	0
Millsaps	0	–	3	–	0	0	–	3	–	0
Mercer	0	–	4	–	0	2	–	6	–	0
Wofford	0	–	4	–	0	0	–	8	–	1
+ – Conference co-champions

The 1920 Auburn Tigers football team represented Auburn University in the 1920 Southern Intercollegiate Athletic Association football season. It was the Tigers' 29th overall season and they competed as a member of the Southern Intercollegiate Athletic Association (SIAA). The team was led by head coach Mike Donahue, in his 16th year, and played their home games at Drake Field in Auburn, Alabama. They finished with a record of seven wins and two losses (7–2 overall, 3–2 in the SIAA). Auburn outscored their opponents by a margin of 332–49, a then school record for points, but were held scoreless in their two losses by the conference co-champions.

== Schedule ==
Date	Opponent	Site	Result	Attendance	Source
September 23	Marion*	Drake Field; Auburn, AL	W 35–0		
October 2	Howard (AL)	Drake Field; Auburn, AL	W 88–0		
October 9	Fort Benning*	Drake Field; Auburn, AL	W 14–2		
October 15	at Clemson	Riggs Field; Clemson, SC	W 21–0		
October 23	Vanderbilt	Rickwood Field; Birmingham, AL	W 56–6	8,000–11,000	
October 30	vs. Georgia	Memorial Stadium; Columbus, AL (rivalry)	L 0–7	7,000	
November 6	vs. Birmingham–Southern*	Gunter Park; Montgomery, AL	W 49–0		
November 13	Washington and Lee*	Rickwood Field; Birmingham, AL	W 77–0		
November 25	at Georgia Tech	Grant Field; Atlanta, GA	L 0–34	20,000	
*Non-conference game
