= Ferdinand Holtkamp =

American football player and sports coach (1889–1944)

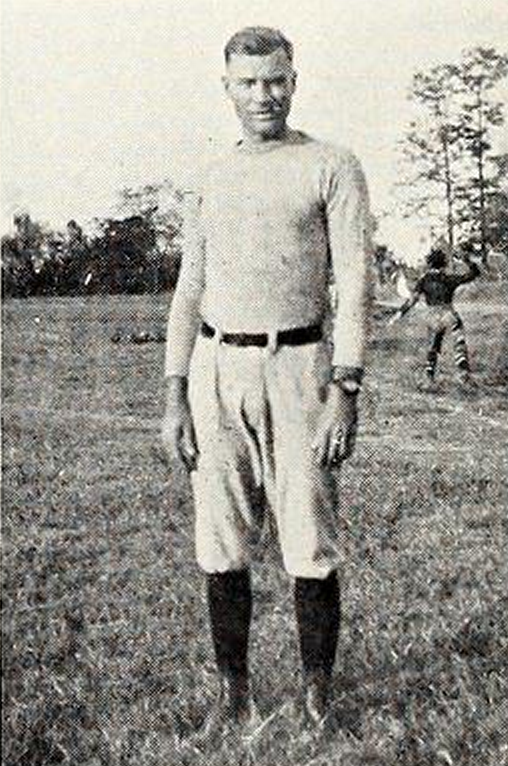
- Holtkamp pictured in Reveille 1922, Mississippi State yearbook

Biographical details
- Born: c. 1889
- Died: 1944 (aged 55); Pearl Harbor, Hawaii, U.S.

Playing career

Football
- 1916–1919: Ohio State
- Position: Center

Coaching career (HC unless noted)

Football
- 1920–1921: Mississippi A&M
- 1922–1925: Western Reserve

Basketball
- 1922–1925: Western Reserve

Head coaching record
- Overall: 25–26–3 (football); 21–25 (basketball)

Ferdinand G. "Fritz" Holtkamp (c. 1889 – 1944) was an American college football and college basketball coach] He served as the head football coach at Mississippi Agricultural & Mechanical College—now known as Mississippi State University—from 1920 to 1921 and Western Reserve University—now a part of Case Western Reserve University—from 1922 to 1925, compiling a career college football coaching record of 25–26–3. During his two-season tenure at Mississippi A&M, Holtkamp compiled a record of 9–7–1) Holtkamp was also the head basketball coach at Western Reserve from 1922 to 1925.

Holtkamp played college football at Ohio State University as a center from 1916 to 1919. He died in 1944 at the age of 55 at Pearl Harbor following a long illness. He had been employed at the naval base as a civilian in construction.

== Head coaching record ==
=== Football ===
Year	Team	Overall	Conference	Standing	Bowl/playoffs
Mississippi A&M Aggies (Southern Intercollegiate Athletic Association) (1920–1921)
1920	Mississippi A&M	5–3	4–2		
1921	Mississippi A&M	4–4–1	2–3–1		
Mississippi A&M:		9–7–1	6–5–1		
Western Reserve Pioneers (Ohio Athletic Conference) (1922–1925)
1922	Western Reserve	3–7	3–6	T–11th	
1923	Western Reserve	5–4	5–4	7th	
1924	Western Reserve	5–2–2	3–2–2	T–7th	
1925	Western Reserve	3–6	2–5	17th	
Western Reserve:		16–19–2	13–17–2		
Total:		25–26–3			
