= 1920 Georgia Bulldogs football team =

American college football season

1920 Georgia Bulldogs football
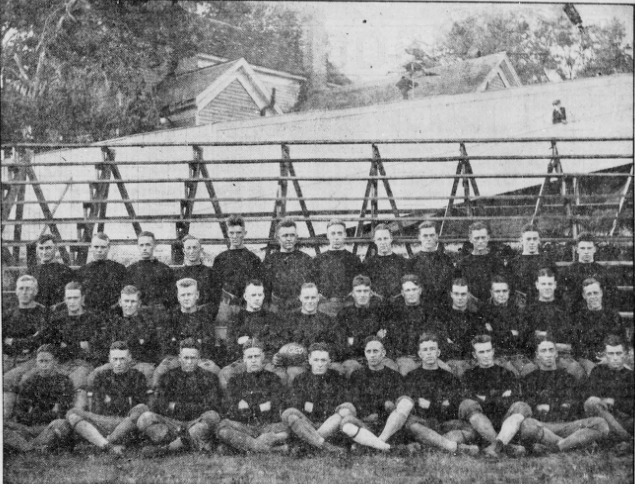

National champion (Berryman) SIAA co-champion
- Conference: Southern Intercollegiate Athletic Association
- Record: 8–0–1 (7–0 SIAA)
- Head coach: Herman Stegeman (1st season)
- Captain: Bum Day
- Home stadium: Sanford Field

Uniform
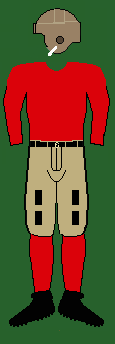

1920 Southern Intercollegiate Athletic Association football standings
	Conf.					Overall
Team	W		L		T	W		L		T
Georgia +	7	–	0	–	0	8	–	0	–	1
Tulane +	5	–	0	–	0	6	–	2	–	1
Georgia Tech +	4	–	0	–	0	8	–	1	–	0
Alabama	6	–	1	–	0	10	–	1	–	0
Centre	4	–	1	–	0	8	–	2	–	0
Furman	3	–	1	–	0	9	–	1	–	0
South Carolina	3	–	1	–	0	5	–	4	–	0
Tennessee	5	–	2	–	0	7	–	2	–	0
Auburn	4	–	2	–	0	7	–	2	–	0
Mississippi A&M	4	–	2	–	0	5	–	3	–	0
Sewanee	3	–	3	–	1	4	–	3	–	1
Vanderbilt	3	–	3	–	0	4	–	3	–	1
Transylvania	2	–	2	–	0	3	–	4	–	0
Howard (AL)	2	–	3	–	0	3	–	5	–	1
Mississippi College	2	–	4	–	0	3	–	5	–	0
Florida	1	–	2	–	0	6	–	3	–	0
Clemson	2	–	6	–	0	4	–	6	–	1
LSU	1	–	3	–	0	5	–	3	–	1
Chattanooga	1	–	3	–	0	3	–	4	–	1
The Citadel	1	–	4	–	0	2	–	6	–	0
Ole Miss	0	–	2	–	0	4	–	3	–	0
Kentucky	0	–	3	–	1	3	–	4	–	1
Georgetown (KY)	0	–	2	–	0	0	–	3	–	0
Millsaps	0	–	3	–	0	0	–	3	–	0
Mercer	0	–	4	–	0	2	–	6	–	0
Wofford	0	–	4	–	0	0	–	8	–	1
+ – Conference co-champions

The 1920 Georgia Bulldogs football team represented the University of Georgia during the 1920 Southern Intercollegiate Athletic Association football season. The Bulldogs had an 8–0–1 record, outscored opponents 250–17, and were also co-champion of the Southern Intercollegiate Athletic Association, with in-state rival Georgia Tech as well as Tulane, which were also undefeated in conference play.

This was the Georgia Bulldogs' first season under the guidance of head coach Herman Stegeman and the team's second undefeated season in its history (first since 1896 under Pop Warner). The Bulldogs were retroactively awarded a national championship by Clyde Berryman.

Georgia fielded a strong line during the early 1920s, this season returning All-Southerns in end Owen Reynolds, tackle Artie Pew, and center and captain Bum Day; as well as guard Hugh Whelchel and a young Joe Bennett. This season, the Bulldogs line was complemented with a strong backfield, led by quarterback Buck Cheves and known as the "ten second backfield." (Note: The term "ten second backfield" generally refers to players capable (or thought to be capable) of running a 100-yard dash in 10 seconds—that is, fast runners.)

Georgia upset rival Auburn. The Bulldogs also gave Furman their only loss, and did the same to Alabama in the year's biggest win. The highlight of the Alabama game, Cheves' 87-yard touchdown after a fumble recovery, ranked fourth in The 50 Greatest Plays In Georgia Bulldogs Football History.

== Schedule ==
Date	Opponent	Site	Result	Attendance
October 2	The Citadel	Sanford Field; Athens, GA	W 40–0	
October 9	at South Carolina	Columbia, SC (rivalry)	W 37–0	
October 13	at Furman	Manly Field; Greenville, SC	W 7–0	
October 23	at Oglethorpe*	Atlanta, GA	W 27–3	
October 30	vs. Auburn	A. J. McClung Memorial Stadium; Columbus, GA (rivalry)	W 7–0	7,000
November 6	at Virginia*	Lambeth Field; Charlottesville, VA	T 0–0	5,000
November 13	Florida	Sanford Field; Athens, GA (rivalry)	W 56–0	
November 20	vs. Alabama	Ponce de Leon Park; Atlanta, GA (rivalry)	W 21–14	11,000
November 25	Clemson	Sanford Field; Athens, GA (rivalry)	W 55–0	5,000
*Non-conference game

== Before the season ==
The Bulldogs were led by first-year head coach Herman Stegeman, who attended the University of Chicago and learned football from the legendary Amos Alonzo Stagg. During the end of World War I, the United States Army stationed Stegeman in Athens to create physical training courses for the UGA Reserve Officers' Training Corps program. Last season, Stegeman was hired by head coach Alex Cunningham as an assistant. Cunningham then went into the Army, and Stegeman was promoted to head coach. Stegeman was assisted by backfield coach and Warner disciple Jimmy DeHart.

== Game summaries ==
=== Week 1: The Citadel ===
The Bulldogs opened the season with a 40–0 defeat of The Citadel. Citadel made one first down. The first score was a 60-yard run by Hartley.

=== Week 2: at South Carolina ===
Week 2: Georgia at South Carolina

Team	1	2	3	4	Total
• Georgia	10	13	14	0	37
S. Carolina	0	0	0	0	0

- Date: October 6
- Location: Columbia, SC

In the second week of play, Georgia easily defeated the South Carolina Gamecocks 37–0, "principally through the ability of Hartley and Cheves to advance the ball by long runs". Hartley returned the second-half kickoff back 95 yards for a touchdown, and had another 75-yard touchdown run two minutes later.

The starting lineup was: Reynolds (left end), J. Bennett (left tackle), Anthony (left guard), Day (center), Murray (right guard), Pew (right tackle), Owens (right end), Cheves (quarterback), Echols (left halfback), Hartley (right halfback), Collings (fullback).

=== Week 3: at Furman ===
Week 3: Georgia at Furman

Team	1	2	3	4	Total
• Georgia	0	0	0	7	7
Furman	0	0	0	0	0

- Date: October 13
- Location: Manly Field
  Greenville, SC
- Game attendance: 2,500

A close-fought game with coach Billy Laval's Speedy Speer-led Furman Purple Hurricane brought the Bulldogs a 7–0 win and Furman's only loss on the year. Georgia scored thanks to a pass from Buck Cheves to Sheldon Fitts. A punting duel with Milton McManaway and Dave Collings featured throughout.

=== Week 4: at Oglethorpe ===
Georgia beat the Oglethorpe Stormy Petrels 27–3. Oglethorpe's captain Knox scored the season's first points on the Bulldogs.

=== Week 5: Auburn ===
Week 5: Auburn at Georgia

Team	1	2	3	4	Total
Auburn	0	0	0	0	0
• Georgia	7	0	0	0	7

- Date: October 30
- Location: McClung Stadium
  Columbus, GA
- Game attendance: 7,000
- Referee: Jogger Elcock

The Bulldogs upset the Auburn Tigers 7–0, getting revenge for last year's loss. The only touchdown of the game was a 20-yard pass from Buck Cheves to Dick Hartley. Frank Stubbs starred for Auburn. Artie Pew was ejected for slugging, and thus missed his chance to go out with an Auburn victory.

The starting lineup was: Reynolds (left end), Pew (left tackle), Whelchel (left guard), Day (center), Vandiver (right guard), J. Bennett (right tackle), P. Bennett (right end), Cheves (quarterback), Hartley (left halfback), Collings (right halfback), Echols (fullback).

=== Week 6: at Virginia ===
Week 6: Georgia at Virginia

Team	1	2	3	4	Total
Georgia	0	0	0	0	0
Virginia	0	0	0	0	0

- Date: November 6
- Location: Lambeth Field
  Charlottesville, VA
- Game attendance: 5,000

The aerial attack of the Virginia Orange and Blue met a staunch Georgia defense as the two teams fought to a scoreless tie in Charlottesville. Owen Reynolds and Paige Bennett starred for Georgia.

The starting lineup was: Reynolds (left end), Pew (left tackle), Whelchel (left guard), Day (center), Vandiver (right guard), Anthony (right tackle), P. Bennett (right end), Cheves (quarterback), Collins (left halfback), Hartley (right halfback), Tanner (fullback).

=== Week 7: Florida ===
Week 7: Florida at Georgia

Team	1	2	3	4	Total
Florida	0	0	0	0	0
• Georgia	7	28	14	7	56

- Date: November 13
- Location: Sanford Field
  Athens, GA
- Referee: W. R. Tichenor

Georgia rolled up a large 56–0 score on the Florida Gators. Florida put up a hard fight until Georgia got its first touchdown across, pouring it on from there. Quarterback Sheldon Fitts was the star of the contest. Fitts and Bohren scored two touchdowns. Paige Bennett, Hartley, Echols, and Collings had one each. Owen Reynolds starred again.

The starting lineup was: Reynolds (left end), J. Bennett (left tackle), Whelchel (left guard), Day (center), Vandiver (right guard), Pew (right tackle), P. Bennett (right end), Pitts (quarterback), Collins (left halfback), Hartley (right halfback), Echols (fullback).

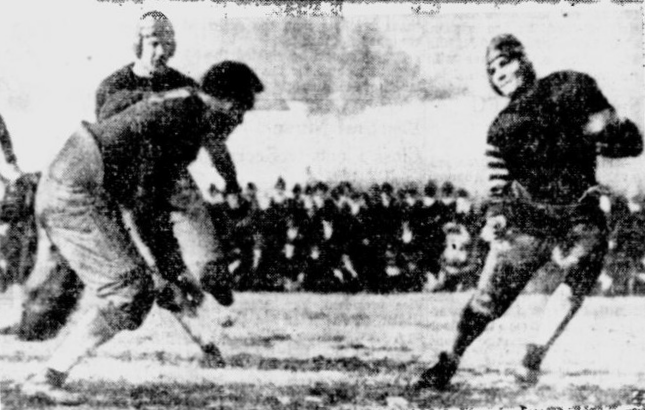
Photo from the Alabama game. Artie Pew is attempting to tackle Riggs Stephenson. Behind Pew is Puss Whelchel.

=== Week 8: Alabama ===
Week 8: Alabama at Georgia

Team	1	2	3	4	Total
Alabama	0	7	7	0	14
• Georgia	14	0	0	7	21

- Date: November 20
- Location: Poncey
  Atlanta, GA
- Game attendance: 11,000
- Referee: W. R. Tichenor

The key win for the conference title was the 21–14 victory over the Alabama Crimson Tide. None of Georgia's touchdowns were scored by the offense.

Paige Bennett recovered a Mullie Lenoir fumble and ran 40 yards for a touchdown. Artie Pew kicked goal. On the next possession, Hugh Whelchel blocked a Riggs Stephenson punt, and Pew picked up the ball running 24 yards to score, kicking his own goal. On the next drive, Lenoir scored. In the third quarter, Al Clemens caught a tipped ball, and ran down the sidelines with a wall of blockers for the tying score. Late in the final period, Georgia's O'Connor tried a drop kick which was blocked by Whelchel. Buck Cheves recovered the ball and ran 87 yards for the touchdown Again Pew converted goal. The recovery by Cheves ranked fourth in The 50 Greatest Plays In Georgia Bulldogs Football History.

The starting lineup was: Reynolds (left end), J. Bennett (left tackle), Vandiver (left guard), Day (center), Whelchel (right guard), Pew (right tackle), P. Bennett (Right end), Pitts (quarterback), Collins (left halfback), Hartley (right halfback), Echols (fullback).

=== Week 9: Clemson ===
Week 9: Clemson at Georgia

Team	1	2	3	4	Total
Clemson	0	0	0	0	0
• Georgia	14	6	21	14	55

- Date: November 25
- Location: Sanford Field
  Athens, GA
- Game attendance: 5,000

Cheves and Hartley starred again in a 55–0 romp over Clemson to end the season. Dave Collings was the star of the contest scoring two touchdowns. The starting lineup was Reynolds (left end), J. Bennett (left tackle), Whelchel (left guard), Day (center), Anthony (right guard), Pew (right tackle), P. Bennett (Right end), Cheves (quarterback), Hartley (left halfback), Collings (right halfback), Echols (fullback).

== After the season ==
Owen Reynolds was elected captain for next year. Reynolds, Pew, and Day were all composite All-Southern selections. Whelchel also made several selections, and Joe Bennett made one.

Rooters on either side of Georgia were happy as both the Bulldogs and Georgia Tech claimed SIAA titles. The Bulldogs were retroactively named the national champion for 1920 under the Berryman QPRS methodology.

== Personnel ==
=== Roster ===
==== Line ====
Number	Player	Position	Games started	Hometown	Prep school	Height	Weight	Age
	Thurston Anthony	Tackle						
11	Joe Bennett	Tackle		Statesboro, Georgia			180	19
13	Paige Bennett	End						
1	Bum Day	Center		Nashville, Georgia	Porter Military Academy	5'10"	190	22
	W. Mercer Murray	Guard		Fort Valley, Georgia	Georgia Military Academy	5'11"	170	19
3	Owen Reynolds	End		Douglasville, Georgia		6'3"	170	
9	Artie Pew	Tackle		Damascus, Georgia			195	22
	Jim Taylor	Tackle		Hazlehurst, Georgia				
4	Nemo Vandiver	Guard						
45	Hugh Whelchel	Guard		Dahlonega, Georgia			200	20

==== Backfield ====
Number	Player	Position	Games started	Hometown	Prep school	Height	Weight	Age
19	Buck Cheves	Quarterback		Richwood, Georgia	Georgia Military College		145	21–22
5	Dave Collings	Halfback		Atlanta, Georgia	Boys High School (Atlanta)			18–19
29	Roy Echols	Fullback			Darlington Academy			
31	Sheldon Fitts	Halfback		Jemison, Alabama	Georgia Military College			20–21
23	Dick Hartley	Halfback		Fort Valley, Georgia	Georgia Military Academy			19–20
	Goat Tanner	Halfback						

==== Unlisted ====
Player
Paul Anderson
Dan Bennett
Joe Blackmon
Bill Campbell

=== Scoring leaders ===
The following is an incomplete list of statistics and scores, largely dependent on newspaper summaries.

Player	Touchdowns	Extra points	Field goals	Points
Dick Hartley	11	0	0	66
Sheldon Fitts	7	0	0	42
Artie Pew	2	28	0	40
Buck Cheves	5	0	0	30
Dave Collings	3	0	1	21
Bohran	3	0	0	18
Joe Bennett	2	3	0	15
Paige Bennett	1	0	0	6
Bum Day	1	0	0	6
Roy Echols	1	0	0	6
Total	36	31	1	250
