= 1920 The Citadel Bulldogs football team =

American college football season

1920 The Citadel Bulldogs football
- Conference: Southern Intercollegiate Athletic Association
- Record: 2–6 (1–4 SIAA)
- Head coach: Harry J. O'Brien (4th season)
- Home stadium: College Park Stadium

1920 Southern Intercollegiate Athletic Association football standings
	Conf.					Overall
Team	W		L		T	W		L		T
Georgia +	7	–	0	–	0	8	–	0	–	1
Tulane +	5	–	0	–	0	6	–	2	–	1
Georgia Tech +	4	–	0	–	0	8	–	1	–	0
Alabama	6	–	1	–	0	10	–	1	–	0
Centre	4	–	1	–	0	8	–	2	–	0
Furman	3	–	1	–	0	9	–	1	–	0
South Carolina	3	–	1	–	0	5	–	4	–	0
Tennessee	5	–	2	–	0	7	–	2	–	0
Auburn	4	–	2	–	0	7	–	2	–	0
Mississippi A&M	4	–	2	–	0	5	–	3	–	0
Sewanee	3	–	3	–	1	4	–	3	–	1
Vanderbilt	3	–	3	–	0	4	–	3	–	1
Transylvania	2	–	2	–	0	3	–	4	–	0
Howard (AL)	2	–	3	–	0	3	–	5	–	1
Mississippi College	2	–	4	–	0	3	–	5	–	0
Florida	1	–	2	–	0	6	–	3	–	0
Clemson	2	–	6	–	0	4	–	6	–	1
LSU	1	–	3	–	0	5	–	3	–	1
Chattanooga	1	–	3	–	0	3	–	4	–	1
The Citadel	1	–	4	–	0	2	–	6	–	0
Ole Miss	0	–	2	–	0	4	–	3	–	0
Kentucky	0	–	3	–	1	3	–	4	–	1
Georgetown (KY)	0	–	2	–	0	0	–	3	–	0
Millsaps	0	–	3	–	0	0	–	3	–	0
Mercer	0	–	4	–	0	2	–	6	–	0
Wofford	0	–	4	–	0	0	–	8	–	1
+ – Conference co-champions

The 1920 The Citadel Bulldogs football team represented The Citadel, The Military College of South Carolina in the 1920 college football season. Harry J. O'Brien returned to lead the Bulldogs after a one-year absence. His second tenure as head coach would last two seasons. The Bulldogs played as members of the Southern Intercollegiate Athletic Association and played home games at College Park Stadium in Hampton Park.

== Schedule ==
Date	Opponent	Site	Result	Source
October 2	at Georgia	Sanford Field; Athens, GA	L 0–40	
October 9	Furman	College Park Stadium; Charleston, SC (rivalry)	L 6–21	
October 16	vs. VMI*	Fairgrounds; Lynchburg, VA (rivalry)	L 0–35	
October 23	Wofford	College Park Stadium; Charleston, SC (rivalry)	W 19–0	
October 30	vs. Davidson*	Wearn Field; Charlotte, NC	L 13–27	
November 6	Newberry*	College Park Stadium; Charleston, SC	W 35–10	
November 11	vs. Clemson	County Fairgrounds; Orangeburg, SC	L 0–26	
November 25	South Carolina	College Park Stadium; Charleston, SC	L 6–7	
*Non-conference game
