= 1920 Centre Praying Colonels football team =

American college football season

1920 Centre Praying Colonels football
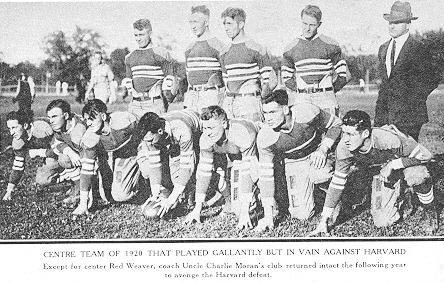

Fort Worth Classic, W 63–7 vs. TCU
- Conference: Southern Intercollegiate Athletic Association
- Record: 8–2 (4–1 SIAA)
- Head coach: Charley Moran (4th season)
- Offensive scheme: Single-wing
- Home stadium: Cheek Field

Uniform
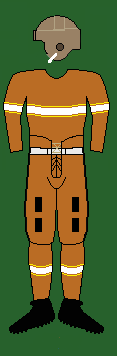

1920 Southern Intercollegiate Athletic Association football standings
| | Conf. | | | | | Overall |
| Team | W | | L | | T | W | | L | | T |
|---|---|---|---|---|---|---|---|---|---|---|
| Georgia + | 7 | – | 0 | – | 0 | 8 | – | 0 | – | 1 |
| Tulane + | 5 | – | 0 | – | 0 | 6 | – | 2 | – | 1 |
| Georgia Tech + | 4 | – | 0 | – | 0 | 8 | – | 1 | – | 0 |
| Alabama | 6 | – | 1 | – | 0 | 10 | – | 1 | – | 0 |
| Centre | 4 | – | 1 | – | 0 | 8 | – | 2 | – | 0 |
| Furman | 3 | – | 1 | – | 0 | 9 | – | 1 | – | 0 |
| South Carolina | 3 | – | 1 | – | 0 | 5 | – | 4 | – | 0 |
| Tennessee | 5 | – | 2 | – | 0 | 7 | – | 2 | – | 0 |
| Auburn | 4 | – | 2 | – | 0 | 7 | – | 2 | – | 0 |
| Mississippi A&M | 4 | – | 2 | – | 0 | 5 | – | 3 | – | 0 |
| Sewanee | 3 | – | 3 | – | 1 | 4 | – | 3 | – | 1 |
| Vanderbilt | 3 | – | 3 | – | 0 | 4 | – | 3 | – | 1 |
| Transylvania | 2 | – | 2 | – | 0 | 3 | – | 4 | – | 0 |
| Howard (AL) | 2 | – | 3 | – | 0 | 3 | – | 5 | – | 1 |
| Mississippi College | 2 | – | 4 | – | 0 | 3 | – | 5 | – | 0 |
| Florida | 1 | – | 2 | – | 0 | 6 | – | 3 | – | 0 |
| Clemson | 2 | – | 6 | – | 0 | 4 | – | 6 | – | 1 |
| LSU | 1 | – | 3 | – | 0 | 5 | – | 3 | – | 1 |
| Chattanooga | 1 | – | 3 | – | 0 | 3 | – | 4 | – | 1 |
| The Citadel | 1 | – | 4 | – | 0 | 2 | – | 6 | – | 0 |
| Ole Miss | 0 | – | 2 | – | 0 | 4 | – | 3 | – | 0 |
| Kentucky | 0 | – | 3 | – | 1 | 3 | – | 4 | – | 1 |
| Georgetown (KY) | 0 | – | 2 | – | 0 | 0 | – | 3 | – | 0 |
| Millsaps | 0 | – | 3 | – | 0 | 0 | – | 3 | – | 0 |
| Mercer | 0 | – | 4 | – | 0 | 2 | – | 6 | – | 0 |
| Wofford | 0 | – | 4 | – | 0 | 0 | – | 8 | – | 1 |
+ – Conference co-champions

The 1920 Centre Praying Colonels football team represented Centre College in the 1920 college football season. The Praying Colonels scored 546 points while allowing 62 points and capped off their season by defeating TCU, 63–7 in the Fort Worth Classic.

== Schedule ==
| Date | Opponent | Site | Result | Attendance | Source |
|---|---|---|---|---|---|
| October 2 | Morris Harvey* | Cheek Field; Danville, KY | W 66–0 | | |
| October 9 | Howard (AL) | Cheek Field; Danville, KY | W 120–0 | | |
| October 16 | Transylvania | Cheek Field; Danville, KY | W 55–0 | | |
| October 23 | at Harvard* | Harvard Stadium; Boston, MA | L 14–31 | 40,000 | |
| October 30 | at Georgia Tech | Grant Field; Atlanta, GA | L 0–24 | | |
| November 6 | at DePauw* | Washington Park; Indianapolis, IN | W 34–0 | | |
| November 13 | at Kentucky | Stoll Field; Lexington, KY (rivalry) | W 49–0 | | |
| November 20 | vs. VPI* | Eclipse Park; Louisville, KY | W 28–0 | | |
| November 25 | Georgetown (KY) | Cheek Field; Danville, KY | W 103–0 | | |
| January 1, 1921 | at TCU* | Panther Park; Fort Worth, TX (Fort Worth Classic) | W 63–7 | 7,000 | |
*Non-conference game

== Season ==
Centre opened the season with three straight wins by a combined score of 241–0, beating Morris Harvey, 66–0; the Howard Bulldogs, 120–0; and Transylvania, 55–0.

A prequel to the 1921 Centre vs. Harvard football game followed; Harvard had not lost a game since 1918 and defeated visiting Centre 31–14, finishing with a record of 8–0–1. With the Harvard game tied 7–7, it was 4th down and 6 at the 30-yard line. Instead of punting, McMillin "defied every "don't" in the football book" and tossed a touchdown pass.

A loss at Georgia Tech followed, 24–0; Georgia Tech finished its season 8–1, having outscored its opponents 312–16. One writer recalled he heard a story that Tech tackle Bill Fincher sought to knock Bo McMillin out of the game, taking with him brass-knuckles or "something equally diabolical."

Centre then defeated DePauw, 34–0, in Indianapolis;Kentucky, 49–0, at Lexington; VPI, 28–0, in Louisville; and the Georgetown Tigers, 103–0.

== Postseason ==
Centre then traveled to Fort Worth, Texas for a bowl game, the Fort Worth Classic, against undefeated TCU. TCU entered the game with a record of 9–0, including wins at Arkansas (19–2) and at Baylor (21–9). Texas Christian had attained its perfect record while outscoring its opponents 163–46. Centre won the game handily. Accounts of the final score vary; some sources say Centre won 63-7 and other sources give the final score as 77–7.

Centre finished the season with a record of 8–2. McMillan was named to the 1920 College Football All-America Team.
