= 1920 Ole Miss Rebels football team =

American college football season

1920 Ole Miss Rebels football
- Conference: Southern Intercollegiate Athletic Association
- Record: 4–3 (0–2 SIAA)
- Head coach: R. L. Sullivan (2nd season)
- Home stadium: Hemingway Stadium

1920 Southern Intercollegiate Athletic Association football standings
	Conf.					Overall
Team	W		L		T	W		L		T
Georgia +	7	–	0	–	0	8	–	0	–	1
Tulane +	5	–	0	–	0	6	–	2	–	1
Georgia Tech +	4	–	0	–	0	8	–	1	–	0
Alabama	6	–	1	–	0	10	–	1	–	0
Centre	4	–	1	–	0	8	–	2	–	0
Furman	3	–	1	–	0	9	–	1	–	0
South Carolina	3	–	1	–	0	5	–	4	–	0
Tennessee	5	–	2	–	0	7	–	2	–	0
Auburn	4	–	2	–	0	7	–	2	–	0
Mississippi A&M	4	–	2	–	0	5	–	3	–	0
Sewanee	3	–	3	–	1	4	–	3	–	1
Vanderbilt	3	–	3	–	0	4	–	3	–	1
Transylvania	2	–	2	–	0	3	–	4	–	0
Howard (AL)	2	–	3	–	0	3	–	5	–	1
Mississippi College	2	–	4	–	0	3	–	5	–	0
Florida	1	–	2	–	0	6	–	3	–	0
Clemson	2	–	6	–	0	4	–	6	–	1
LSU	1	–	3	–	0	5	–	3	–	1
Chattanooga	1	–	3	–	0	3	–	4	–	1
The Citadel	1	–	4	–	0	2	–	6	–	0
Ole Miss	0	–	2	–	0	4	–	3	–	0
Kentucky	0	–	3	–	1	3	–	4	–	1
Georgetown (KY)	0	–	2	–	0	0	–	3	–	0
Millsaps	0	–	3	–	0	0	–	3	–	0
Mercer	0	–	4	–	0	2	–	6	–	0
Wofford	0	–	4	–	0	0	–	8	–	1
+ – Conference co-champions

The 1920 Ole Miss Rebels football team represented the University of Mississippi (Ole Miss) as a member of the Southern Intercollegiate Athletic Association (SIAA) during the 1920 college football season. Led by second-year head coach R. L. Sullivan, the Rebels compiled an overall record of 4–3, with a mark of 0–2 in conference play. Ole Miss played home games at Hemingway Stadium in Oxford, Mississippi.

== Schedule ==
Date	Opponent	Site	Result	Source
October 2	Jonesboro Aggies*	Hemingway Stadium; Oxford, MS	W 33–0	
October 9	at Mississippi Normal*	Kamper Park; Hattiesburg, MS	W 54–0	
October 16	at Birmingham–Southern*	Rickwood Field; Birmingham, AL	L 6–27	
October 23	at Tulane	Tulane Stadium; New Orleans, LA (rivalry)	L 0–32	
October 29	Union (TN)*	Hemingway Stadium; Oxford, MS	W 87–0	
November 6	vs. Mississippi A&M	Greenwood, MS (Egg Bowl)	L 0–20	
November 12	Southwestern Presbyterian*	Hemingway Stadium; Oxford, MS	W 38–6	
November 20	vs. Tennessee	Memphis, TN	Canceled	
November 25	vs. Mississippi College	Fair Grounds; Jackson, MS	Canceled	
*Non-conference game
