= 1920 Chattanooga Moccasins football team =

American college football season

1920 Chattanooga Moccasins football
- Conference: Southern Intercollegiate Athletic Association
- Record: 3–4–1 (1–3 SIAA)
- Head coach: Silas Williams (2nd season)
- Captain: Bill Redd
- Home stadium: Chamberlain Field

1920 Southern Intercollegiate Athletic Association football standings
	Conf.					Overall
Team	W		L		T	W		L		T
Georgia +	7	–	0	–	0	8	–	0	–	1
Tulane +	5	–	0	–	0	6	–	2	–	1
Georgia Tech +	4	–	0	–	0	8	–	1	–	0
Alabama	6	–	1	–	0	10	–	1	–	0
Centre	4	–	1	–	0	8	–	2	–	0
Furman	3	–	1	–	0	9	–	1	–	0
South Carolina	3	–	1	–	0	5	–	4	–	0
Tennessee	5	–	2	–	0	7	–	2	–	0
Auburn	4	–	2	–	0	7	–	2	–	0
Mississippi A&M	4	–	2	–	0	5	–	3	–	0
Sewanee	3	–	3	–	1	4	–	3	–	1
Vanderbilt	3	–	3	–	0	4	–	3	–	1
Transylvania	2	–	2	–	0	3	–	4	–	0
Howard (AL)	2	–	3	–	0	3	–	5	–	1
Mississippi College	2	–	4	–	0	3	–	5	–	0
Florida	1	–	2	–	0	6	–	3	–	0
Clemson	2	–	6	–	0	4	–	6	–	1
LSU	1	–	3	–	0	5	–	3	–	1
Chattanooga	1	–	3	–	0	3	–	4	–	1
The Citadel	1	–	4	–	0	2	–	6	–	0
Ole Miss	0	–	2	–	0	4	–	3	–	0
Kentucky	0	–	3	–	1	3	–	4	–	1
Georgetown (KY)	0	–	2	–	0	0	–	3	–	0
Millsaps	0	–	3	–	0	0	–	3	–	0
Mercer	0	–	4	–	0	2	–	6	–	0
Wofford	0	–	4	–	0	0	–	8	–	1
+ – Conference co-champions

The 1920 Chattanooga Moccasins football team represented the University of Chattanooga (now known as the University of Tennessee at Chattanooga) as a member of the Southern Intercollegiate Athletic Association during the 1920 college football season. In their second season under head coach Silas Williams, the Moccasins completed its 8-game schedule with a record of 3 wins, 4 losses, and 1 tie.

== Schedule ==
Date	Opponent	Site	Result	Source
October 2	vs. Tusculum*	Knoxville, TN	W 21–0	
October 9	Oglethorpe*	Chamberlain Field; Chattanooga, TN	T 14–14	
October 17	Tennessee	Chamberlain Field; Chattanooga, TN	L 35–0	
October 24	Mercer	Chamberlain Field; Chattanooga, TN	W 20–0	
October 31	Carson–Newman*	Chamberlain Field; Chattanooga, TN	W 83–0	
November 6	at Sewanee	Hardee Field; Sewanee, TN	L 0–33	
November 12	at Birmingham–Southern*	Munger Bowl; Birmingham, AL	L 0–27	
November 25	at Transylvania	Stoll Field; Lexington, KY	L 7–33	
*Non-conference game
