= 1920 Sewanee Tigers football team =

American college football season

1920 Sewanee Tigers football
- Conference: Southern Intercollegiate Athletic Association
- Record: 4–3–1 (3–3–1 SIAA)
- Head coach: Earl Abell (2nd season)
- Captain: Bill Coughlan
- Home stadium: Hardee Field

1920 Southern Intercollegiate Athletic Association football standings
	Conf.					Overall
Team	W		L		T	W		L		T
Georgia +	7	–	0	–	0	8	–	0	–	1
Tulane +	5	–	0	–	0	6	–	2	–	1
Georgia Tech +	4	–	0	–	0	8	–	1	–	0
Alabama	6	–	1	–	0	10	–	1	–	0
Centre	4	–	1	–	0	8	–	2	–	0
Furman	3	–	1	–	0	9	–	1	–	0
South Carolina	3	–	1	–	0	5	–	4	–	0
Tennessee	5	–	2	–	0	7	–	2	–	0
Auburn	4	–	2	–	0	7	–	2	–	0
Mississippi A&M	4	–	2	–	0	5	–	3	–	0
Sewanee	3	–	3	–	1	4	–	3	–	1
Vanderbilt	3	–	3	–	0	4	–	3	–	1
Transylvania	2	–	2	–	0	3	–	4	–	0
Howard (AL)	2	–	3	–	0	3	–	5	–	1
Mississippi College	2	–	4	–	0	3	–	5	–	0
Florida	1	–	2	–	0	6	–	3	–	0
Clemson	2	–	6	–	0	4	–	6	–	1
LSU	1	–	3	–	0	5	–	3	–	1
Chattanooga	1	–	3	–	0	3	–	4	–	1
The Citadel	1	–	4	–	0	2	–	6	–	0
Ole Miss	0	–	2	–	0	4	–	3	–	0
Kentucky	0	–	3	–	1	3	–	4	–	1
Georgetown (KY)	0	–	2	–	0	0	–	3	–	0
Millsaps	0	–	3	–	0	0	–	3	–	0
Mercer	0	–	4	–	0	2	–	6	–	0
Wofford	0	–	4	–	0	0	–	8	–	1
+ – Conference co-champions

The 1920 Sewanee Tigers football team represented Sewanee: The University of the South during the 1920 college football season as a member of the Southern Intercollegiate Athletic Association (SIAA). The Tigers were led by head coach Earl Abell in his second season and finished with a record of four wins, three losses, and one tie (4–3–1 overall, 3–3–1 in the SIAA).

== Schedule ==
Date	Opponent	Site	Result	Attendance	Source
October 2	Bryson College*	Hardee Field; Sewanee, TN	W 7–0		
October 9	Georgetown (KY)	Hardee Field; Sewanee, TN	W 54–0		
October 15	at Oglethorpe	Ponce de Leon Park; Atlanta, GA	W 21–13		
October 23	at Kentucky	Stoll Field; Lexington, KY	T 6–6		
October 30	at Alabama	Rickwood Field; Birmingham, AL	L 0–21	6,000	
November 6	Chattanooga	Hardee Field; Sewanee, TN	W 33–0		
November 13	vs. Tennessee	Chamberlain Field; Chattanooga, TN	L 0–20		
November 25	at Vanderbilt	Dudley Field; Nashville, TN (rivalry)	L 3–21		
*Non-conference game
