= 1920 Clemson Tigers football team =

American college football season

1920 Clemson Tigers football
- Conference: Southern Intercollegiate Athletic Association
- Record: 4–6–1 (2–6 SIAA)
- Head coach: Edward Donahue (4th season)
- Captain: Boo Armstrong
- Home stadium: Riggs Field

1920 Southern Intercollegiate Athletic Association football standings
	Conf.					Overall
Team	W		L		T	W		L		T
Georgia +	7	–	0	–	0	8	–	0	–	1
Tulane +	5	–	0	–	0	6	–	2	–	1
Georgia Tech +	4	–	0	–	0	8	–	1	–	0
Alabama	6	–	1	–	0	10	–	1	–	0
Centre	4	–	1	–	0	8	–	2	–	0
Furman	3	–	1	–	0	9	–	1	–	0
South Carolina	3	–	1	–	0	5	–	4	–	0
Tennessee	5	–	2	–	0	7	–	2	–	0
Auburn	4	–	2	–	0	7	–	2	–	0
Mississippi A&M	4	–	2	–	0	5	–	3	–	0
Sewanee	3	–	3	–	1	4	–	3	–	1
Vanderbilt	3	–	3	–	0	4	–	3	–	1
Transylvania	2	–	2	–	0	3	–	4	–	0
Howard (AL)	2	–	3	–	0	3	–	5	–	1
Mississippi College	2	–	4	–	0	3	–	5	–	0
Florida	1	–	2	–	0	6	–	3	–	0
Clemson	2	–	6	–	0	4	–	6	–	1
LSU	1	–	3	–	0	5	–	3	–	1
Chattanooga	1	–	3	–	0	3	–	4	–	1
The Citadel	1	–	4	–	0	2	–	6	–	0
Ole Miss	0	–	2	–	0	4	–	3	–	0
Kentucky	0	–	3	–	1	3	–	4	–	1
Georgetown (KY)	0	–	2	–	0	0	–	3	–	0
Millsaps	0	–	3	–	0	0	–	3	–	0
Mercer	0	–	4	–	0	2	–	6	–	0
Wofford	0	–	4	–	0	0	–	8	–	1
+ – Conference co-champions

The 1920 Clemson Tigers football team represented Clemson Agricultural College—now known as Clemson University—as a member of the Southern Intercollegiate Athletic Association (SIAA) during the 1920 college football season. Led by Edward Donahue in his fourth and final season as head coach, the Tigers compiled an overall record of 4–6–1 with a mark of 2–6 in SIAA play. Boo Armstrong was the team captain.

== Schedule ==
Date	Opponent	Site	Result	Attendance	Source
September 24	Erskine*	Riggs Field; Calhoun, SC	W 26–0		
October 1	Presbyterian*	Riggs Field; Calhoun, SC	T 7–7		
October 2	Newberry*	Riggs Field; Calhoun, SC	W 26–6		
October 9	Wofford	Riggs Field; Calhoun, SC	W 13–7		
October 15	Auburn	Riggs Field; Calhoun, SC (rivalry)	L 0–21		
October 23	at Tennessee	Waite Field; Knoxville, TN	L 0–26		
October 28	at South Carolina^{†}	State Fairgrounds; Columbia, SC (rivalry)	L 0–3		
November 6	at Georgia Tech	Grant Field; Atlanta, GA (rivalry)	L 0–7		
November 11	vs. The Citadel	County Fairgrounds; Orangeburg, SC	W 26–0		
November 20	at Furman	Manly Field; Greenville, SC	L 0–14		
November 25	at Georgia	Sanford Field; Athens, GA (rivalry)	L 0–55	5,000	
*Non-conference game; ^{†}Homecoming

== Bibliography ==
- Bourret, Tim. "2010 Clemson Football Media Guide" (PDF). Clemson University. p. 202. Archived from the original (PDF) on November 12, 2012.
