= 1920 Tennessee Volunteers football team =

American college football season

1920 Tennessee Volunteers football
- Conference: Southern Intercollegiate Athletic Association
- Record: 7–2 (5–2 SIAA)
- Head coach: John R. Bender (3rd season)
- Captain: Buck Hatcher
- Home stadium: Waite Field

1920 Southern Intercollegiate Athletic Association football standings
	Conf.					Overall
Team	W		L		T	W		L		T
Georgia +	7	–	0	–	0	8	–	0	–	1
Tulane +	5	–	0	–	0	6	–	2	–	1
Georgia Tech +	4	–	0	–	0	8	–	1	–	0
Alabama	6	–	1	–	0	10	–	1	–	0
Centre	4	–	1	–	0	8	–	2	–	0
Furman	3	–	1	–	0	9	–	1	–	0
South Carolina	3	–	1	–	0	5	–	4	–	0
Tennessee	5	–	2	–	0	7	–	2	–	0
Auburn	4	–	2	–	0	7	–	2	–	0
Mississippi A&M	4	–	2	–	0	5	–	3	–	0
Sewanee	3	–	3	–	1	4	–	3	–	1
Vanderbilt	3	–	3	–	0	4	–	3	–	1
Transylvania	2	–	2	–	0	3	–	4	–	0
Howard (AL)	2	–	3	–	0	3	–	5	–	1
Mississippi College	2	–	4	–	0	3	–	5	–	0
Florida	1	–	2	–	0	6	–	3	–	0
Clemson	2	–	6	–	0	4	–	6	–	1
LSU	1	–	3	–	0	5	–	3	–	1
Chattanooga	1	–	3	–	0	3	–	4	–	1
The Citadel	1	–	4	–	0	2	–	6	–	0
Ole Miss	0	–	2	–	0	4	–	3	–	0
Kentucky	0	–	3	–	1	3	–	4	–	1
Georgetown (KY)	0	–	2	–	0	0	–	3	–	0
Millsaps	0	–	3	–	0	0	–	3	–	0
Mercer	0	–	4	–	0	2	–	6	–	0
Wofford	0	–	4	–	0	0	–	8	–	1
+ – Conference co-champions

The 1920 Tennessee Volunteers football team (variously "Tennessee", "UT" or the "Vols") represented the University of Tennessee in the 1920 Southern Intercollegiate Athletic Association football season. Playing as a member of the Southern Intercollegiate Athletic Association (SIAA), the team was led by head coach John R. Bender, in his third year, and played their home games at Waite Field in Knoxville, Tennessee. They finished the season 7–2 overall and 5–2 in the SIAA. The Volunteers offense scored 243 points while the defense allowed 40 points.

== Schedule ==
Date	Opponent	Site	Result	Source
September 25	Emory and Henry*	Waite Field; Knoxville, TN	W 45–0	
October 2	Maryville (TN)*	Waite Field; Knoxville, TN	W 47–0	
October 9	Vanderbilt	Waite Field; Knoxville, TN (rivalry)	L 0–20	
October 16	at Chattanooga	Chamberlain Field; Chattanooga, TN	W 35–0	
October 23	Clemson	Waite Field; Knoxville, TN	W 26–0	
October 30	at Mississippi A&M	Scott Field; Starkville, MS	L 7–13	
November 6	Transylvania	Waite Field; Knoxville, TN	W 49–0	
November 13	vs. Sewanee	Chamberlain Field; Chattanooga, TN	W 20–0	
November 20	vs. Ole Miss	Memphis, TN	Canceled	
November 25	Kentucky	Waite Field; Knoxville, TN	W 14–7	
*Non-conference game
