= Jack Hovater =

American football player (1897–1965)

Profile
- Positions: Halfback, quarterback, tackle

Personal information
- Born: August 31, 1897; Russellville, Alabama, U.S.
- Died: April 9, 1965 (aged 67); Dothan, Alabama, U.S.
- Listed weight: 190 lb (86 kg)

Career information
- College: Alabama (1916–1917; 1919–1922)

Awards and highlights
- All-Southern (1919; 1922)

Jack Hovater (August 31, 1897 – April 9, 1965) was an American college football player and high school football coach. He was also once president of the Alabama State League. Hovater was a prominent running back and tackle for the Alabama Crimson Tide; twice selected All-Southern and captain of the 1917 team. He played with two other Hovater brothers on the 1916 team. He and Ike Boone were ends on the 1919 team.

Hovater later coach football and taught at Dothan High School in Dothan, Alabama. He died on April 9, 1965, at his home in Dothan.
