= 1920 Florida Gators football team =

American college football season

1920 Florida Gators football
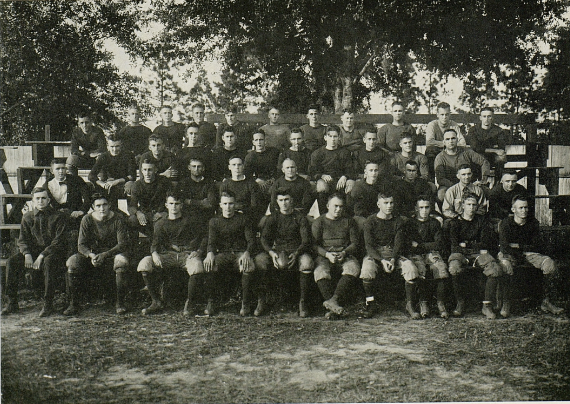
- Conference: Southern Intercollegiate Athletic Association
- Record: 6–3 (1–2 SIAA)
- Head coach: William G. Kline (1st season)
- Captain: Paul Baker
- Home stadium: Fleming Field

1920 Southern Intercollegiate Athletic Association football standings
	Conf.					Overall
Team	W		L		T	W		L		T
Georgia +	7	–	0	–	0	8	–	0	–	1
Tulane +	5	–	0	–	0	6	–	2	–	1
Georgia Tech +	4	–	0	–	0	8	–	1	–	0
Alabama	6	–	1	–	0	10	–	1	–	0
Centre	4	–	1	–	0	8	–	2	–	0
Furman	3	–	1	–	0	9	–	1	–	0
South Carolina	3	–	1	–	0	5	–	4	–	0
Tennessee	5	–	2	–	0	7	–	2	–	0
Auburn	4	–	2	–	0	7	–	2	–	0
Mississippi A&M	4	–	2	–	0	5	–	3	–	0
Sewanee	3	–	3	–	1	4	–	3	–	1
Vanderbilt	3	–	3	–	0	4	–	3	–	1
Transylvania	2	–	2	–	0	3	–	4	–	0
Howard (AL)	2	–	3	–	0	3	–	5	–	1
Mississippi College	2	–	4	–	0	3	–	5	–	0
Florida	1	–	2	–	0	6	–	3	–	0
Clemson	2	–	6	–	0	4	–	6	–	1
LSU	1	–	3	–	0	5	–	3	–	1
Chattanooga	1	–	3	–	0	3	–	4	–	1
The Citadel	1	–	4	–	0	2	–	6	–	0
Ole Miss	0	–	2	–	0	4	–	3	–	0
Kentucky	0	–	3	–	1	3	–	4	–	1
Georgetown (KY)	0	–	2	–	0	0	–	3	–	0
Millsaps	0	–	3	–	0	0	–	3	–	0
Mercer	0	–	4	–	0	2	–	6	–	0
Wofford	0	–	4	–	0	0	–	8	–	1
+ – Conference co-champions

The 1920 Florida Gators football team represented the University of Florida during the 1920 college football season. The season was law professor William G. Kline's first of three as the head coach of the Florida Gators football team. Kline's 1920 Florida Gators compiled a marginally better 6–3 overall record than the 1919 Gators, but a lesser 1–2 conference record against Southern Intercollegiate Athletic Association (SIAA) competition.

While the Gators improved their series records against traditional in-state opponents like Southern College and Stetson, they also suffered a shutout defeat by Tulane and lost their fourth consecutive game to the Georgia Bulldogs.

== Before the season ==
Kline was a former halfback for the Illinois Fighting Illini, and had previously coached the Nebraska Cornhuskers.

== Schedule ==
Date	Opponent	Site	Result	Attendance	Source
October 9	Newberry*	Fleming Field; Gainesville, FL	W 21–0		
October 16	Southern College*	Fleming Field; Gainesville, FL	W 13–0		
October 23	Rollins*		W 1–0 (forfeit)		
October 29	vs. Mercer	Valdosta, GA	W 30–0		
November 6	vs. Tulane	Plant Field; Tampa, FL	L 0–14		
November 11	vs. Stetson*	Palatka, FL	W 26–0	3,000+	
November 13	at Georgia	Sanford Field; Athens, GA (rivalry)	L 0–56		
November 20	Stetson*	Fleming Field; Gainesville, FL	W 21–0		
November 25	at Oglethorpe*	Memorial Stadium; Columbus, GA	L 0–21		
*Non-conference game

== Game summaries ==
=== Newberry ===
In the season's opening week, the Gators beat Newberry, 21 to 0. The substitutes were sent in by the end.

=== Southern College ===
Week 2: Southern College at Florida

Team	1	2	3	4	Total
Southern	0	0	0	0	0
• Florida	0	0	7	6	13

- Date: October 23
- Location: Fleming Field, Gainesville, FL

The Gators got revenge on Southern College for the previous year's loss with a 13–0 win. C. Anderson scored first, in the third quarter. Tully Hoyt Carlton scored the second after a series of forward passes from C. Anderson to Carlton. After the second score, Carlton failed to make the extra point for the only time all season.

=== Rollins ===
Florida defeated Rollins by forfeit, who did not show up for the game.

=== Mercer ===
Florida easily defeated Mercer. "Carlton was the outstanding hero of the game. He ran through the entire Mercer aggregation several times for long gains and scored three of Florida's touchdowns.

Florida's starting lineup against Mercer: Swanson (left end), Baker (left tackle), Norton (left guard), Perry (center), Meisch (right guard), Vandergrift (right tackle) Driggers (right end), B. Anderson (quarterback), C. Anderson (left halfback), Carlton (right halfback), Stanley (fullback).

=== Tulane ===
Week 5: Tulane at Florida

Team	1	2	3	4	Total
• Tulane	0	0	0	14	14
Florida	0	0	0	0	0

- Date: November 6
- Location: Plant Field, Tampa, FL
- Referee: Ham Dowling

The Gators were beaten 14 to 0 by Tulane after the Gators had outplayed them for two periods. Despite the loss, Tootie Perry played one of the best games seen in Tampa.

The starting lineup was Swanson (left end), Baker (left tackle), Meisch (left guard), Wilsky (center), Perry (right guard), Vandergrif (right tackle), Briggers (right end), B. Anderson (quarterback), C. Anderson (left halfback), C. (right halfback), Merren (fullback).

=== Stetson ===
Florida beat Stetson, 26 to 0, in a game played in Palatka, Florida. The first team played lightly through the first quarter, and then substitutes were used. The field was soggy and hard to play on. The only thrill of the game came when Crom Anderson ran 90 yards for a touchdown.

=== Georgia ===
Week 7: Florida at Georgia

Team	1	2	3	4	Total
Florida	0	0	0	0	0
• Georgia	7	28	14	7	56

- Date: November 13
- Location: Sanford Field
  Athens, GA
- Referee: W. R. Tichenor

Southern Intercollegiate Athletic Association (SIAA) champion Georgia's "ten second backfield" (Note: The term "ten second backfield" generally refers to players capable (or thought to be capable) of running a 100-yard dash in 10 seconds—that is, fast runners.) and powerful line rolled up a large, 56–0, score on the Gators. Florida put up a hard fight until Georgia got its first touchdown across, pouring it on from there. Georgia running back Sheldon Fitts was the star of the contest.

Wilsky and Carlton were recovering from injuries suffered in the Tulane game, and during the game Meisch and Vandegrift were carried off. Jim Merrin played best for the Gators.

Florida's starting lineup against Georgia: Swanson (left end), Baker (left tackle), Otto (left guard), Perry (center), Hodges (right guard), Vandergrift (right tackle) Coleman (right end), B. Anderson (quarterback), Pomeroy (left halfback), C. Anderson (right halfback), Merrin (fullback).

=== Stetson ===
Florida defeated the Stetson Hatters by three touchdowns using mostly straight football. "The only spectacular play of the game was when C. Anderson ran 80 yards for a touchdown, but unfortunately Florida was offside."

Florida's starting lineup against Stetson: Coleman (left end), Baker (left tackle), Meisch (left guard), Wilsky (center), Perry (right guard), Dimberline (right tackle) Hughes (right end), B. Anderson (quarterback), C. Anderson (left halfback), Carlton (right halfback), Robinson (fullback).

=== Oglethorpe ===
Week 9: Florida at Oglethorpe

Team	1	2	3	4	Total
Florida	0	0	0	0	0
• Oglethorpe	7	7	7	0	21

- Date: November 25
- Location: Memorial Stadium
  Columbus, GA
- Sources

The Gators made thirteen first downs to Oglethorpe's three, yet lost 21 to 0. Oglethorpe made its first two touchdowns off fumbles.

Florida's starting lineup against Oglethorpe: Swanson (left end), Baker (left tackle), Perry (left guard), Wilsky (center), Norton (right guard), Hodges (right tackle) Hughes (right end), Carlton (quarterback), Pomeroy (left halfback), C. Anderson (right halfback), Robinson (fullback).

== Players ==
=== Line ===
Player	Position	Games started	Hometown	Prep school	Height	Weight	Age
Paul Baker	tackle						
Roy Driggers	end						
Herbie Ford	tackle						
Lanky Hodges	tackle						
Ed Meisch	guard						
Snowball Norton	guard						
Conch Otto	guard						
Tootie Perry	guard						
Bob Swanson	end						
Vandy Vandegrift	tackle						
Count Wilsky	center						

=== Backfield ===
Player	Position	Games started	Hometown	Prep school	Height	Weight	Age
B. Anderson	quarterback						
Crom A. Anderson	halfback						
Tully Hoyt Carlton	halfback						
Jim Merrin	fullback						

== Bibliography ==
- McCarthy, Kevin M. (2000). Fightin' Gators: A History of University of Florida Football. Mount Pleasant, South Carolina: Arcadia Publishing. ISBN 978-0-7385-0559-6.
- Scott, Franklin W. (1918). Semi-Centennial Alumni Record of the University of Illinois. Chicago, Illinois: R.H. Donnelley & Sons Company.
- University of Florida (1921). The Seminole. Vol. 12.
