= 1920 South Carolina Gamecocks football team =

American college football season

1920 South Carolina Gamecocks football
- Conference: Southern Intercollegiate Athletic Association
- Record: 5–4 (3–1 SIAA)
- Head coach: Sol Metzger (1st season)
- Captain: Edward Smith
- Home stadium: University Field

1920 Southern Intercollegiate Athletic Association football standings
	Conf.					Overall
Team	W		L		T	W		L		T
Georgia +	7	–	0	–	0	8	–	0	–	1
Tulane +	5	–	0	–	0	6	–	2	–	1
Georgia Tech +	4	–	0	–	0	8	–	1	–	0
Alabama	6	–	1	–	0	10	–	1	–	0
Centre	4	–	1	–	0	8	–	2	–	0
Furman	3	–	1	–	0	9	–	1	–	0
South Carolina	3	–	1	–	0	5	–	4	–	0
Tennessee	5	–	2	–	0	7	–	2	–	0
Auburn	4	–	2	–	0	7	–	2	–	0
Mississippi A&M	4	–	2	–	0	5	–	3	–	0
Sewanee	3	–	3	–	1	4	–	3	–	1
Vanderbilt	3	–	3	–	0	4	–	3	–	1
Transylvania	2	–	2	–	0	3	–	4	–	0
Howard (AL)	2	–	3	–	0	3	–	5	–	1
Mississippi College	2	–	4	–	0	3	–	5	–	0
Florida	1	–	2	–	0	6	–	3	–	0
Clemson	2	–	6	–	0	4	–	6	–	1
LSU	1	–	3	–	0	5	–	3	–	1
Chattanooga	1	–	3	–	0	3	–	4	–	1
The Citadel	1	–	4	–	0	2	–	6	–	0
Ole Miss	0	–	2	–	0	4	–	3	–	0
Kentucky	0	–	3	–	1	3	–	4	–	1
Georgetown (KY)	0	–	2	–	0	0	–	3	–	0
Millsaps	0	–	3	–	0	0	–	3	–	0
Mercer	0	–	4	–	0	2	–	6	–	0
Wofford	0	–	4	–	0	0	–	8	–	1
+ – Conference co-champions

The 1920 South Carolina Gamecocks football team represented the University of South Carolina during the 1920 Southern Intercollegiate Athletic Association football season. Led by first-year head coach Sol Metzger, the Gamecocks compiled an overall record of 5–4 with a mark of 3–1 in SIAA play.

== Schedule ==
Date	Opponent	Site	Result	Source
October 2	Wofford	University Field; Columbia, SC	W 10–0	
October 9	Georgia	University Field; Columbia, SC	L 0–37	
October 16	at North Carolina*	Emerson Field; Chapel Hill, NC	L 0–7	
October 21	vs. Presbyterian*	Fairgrounds; Augusta, GA	W 14–0	
October 28	Clemson	State Fairgrounds; Columbia, SC	W 3–0	
November 6	at Davidson	Sprunt Athletic Field; Davidson, NC	L 0–27	
November 13	at Navy*	Worden Field; Annapolis, MD	L 0–63	
November 20	Newberry*	University Field; Columbia, SC	W 48–0	
November 25	at The Citadel	College Park Stadium; Charleston, SC	W 7–6	
*Non-conference game
