= 1920 Furman Purple Hurricane football team =

American college football season

1920 Furman Purple Hurricane football

State champion
- Conference: Southern Intercollegiate Athletic Association
- Record: 9–1 (3–1 SIAA)
- Head coach: Billy Laval (6th season)
- Home stadium: Manly Field

1920 Southern Intercollegiate Athletic Association football standings
	Conf.					Overall
Team	W		L		T	W		L		T
Georgia +	7	–	0	–	0	8	–	0	–	1
Tulane +	5	–	0	–	0	6	–	2	–	1
Georgia Tech +	4	–	0	–	0	8	–	1	–	0
Alabama	6	–	1	–	0	10	–	1	–	0
Centre	4	–	1	–	0	8	–	2	–	0
Furman	3	–	1	–	0	9	–	1	–	0
South Carolina	3	–	1	–	0	5	–	4	–	0
Tennessee	5	–	2	–	0	7	–	2	–	0
Auburn	4	–	2	–	0	7	–	2	–	0
Mississippi A&M	4	–	2	–	0	5	–	3	–	0
Sewanee	3	–	3	–	1	4	–	3	–	1
Vanderbilt	3	–	3	–	0	4	–	3	–	1
Transylvania	2	–	2	–	0	3	–	4	–	0
Howard (AL)	2	–	3	–	0	3	–	5	–	1
Mississippi College	2	–	4	–	0	3	–	5	–	0
Florida	1	–	2	–	0	6	–	3	–	0
Clemson	2	–	6	–	0	4	–	6	–	1
LSU	1	–	3	–	0	5	–	3	–	1
Chattanooga	1	–	3	–	0	3	–	4	–	1
The Citadel	1	–	4	–	0	2	–	6	–	0
Ole Miss	0	–	2	–	0	4	–	3	–	0
Kentucky	0	–	3	–	1	3	–	4	–	1
Georgetown (KY)	0	–	2	–	0	0	–	3	–	0
Millsaps	0	–	3	–	0	0	–	3	–	0
Mercer	0	–	4	–	0	2	–	6	–	0
Wofford	0	–	4	–	0	0	–	8	–	1
+ – Conference co-champions

The 1920 Furman Purple Hurricane football team represented the Furman University during the 1920 Southern Intercollegiate Athletic Association football season. Led by sixth-year head coach Billy Laval, the Purple Hurricane compiled an overall record of 9–1 with a mark of 3–1 in SIAA play.

== Schedule ==
Date	Opponent	Site	Result	Source
September 25	Elon*	Manly Field; Greenville, SC	W 33–0	
October 2	Erskine*	Manly Field; Greenville, SC	W 41–0	
October 9	at The Citadel	College Park Stadium; Charleston, SC (rivalry)	W 21–6	
October 16	Georgia	Manly Field; Greenville, SC	L 7–0	
October 23	Wake Forest*	Manly Field; Greenville, SC	W 17–0	
October 29	at Newberry*	Newberry, SC	W 42–0	
November 6	Oglethorpe*	Manly Field; Greenville, SC	W 42–3	
November 11	Clemson	Manly Field; Greenville, SC	W 14–0	
November 13	at Wofford	Spartanburg, SC (rivalry)	W 69–0	
November 25	Davidson*	Manly Field; Greenville, SC	W 7–0	
*Non-conference game
