= Denny Field (Alabama) =

Stadium in Tuscaloosa, Alabama

- Interactive map of Denny Field
- Former names: University Field (1915–1920)
- Location: 10th Street at 7th Avenue; Tuscaloosa, Alabama 35487
- Coordinates: 33°12′26″N 87°32′46″W
- Owner: University of Alabama
- Operator: University of Alabama
- Surface: Natural grass

Construction
- Opened: 1915
- Closed: 1928

Tenant
- Alabama Crimson Tide (1915–1929)

Denny Field was located in Tuscaloosa, Alabama, and served as the home field for the University of Alabama football team from 1915 through the 1928 seasons, excluding 1918 when a team was not fielded due to World War I. The field was located at the intersection of 10th Street and 7th Avenue at the southern edge of the University of Alabama campus. At present, its former location is the site of portions of the new sorority row along Judy Bonner Drive and a parking lot.

The venue opened in 1915, and was originally named University Field. It was rededicated as Denny Field on October 9, 1920, prior to the third game of the 1920 season against Birmingham–Southern. Named in honor of former Alabama president George H. Denny, at that time official Denny Field signage was unveiled and it was noted that the name was selected due to Dr. Denny's continued support of the growth of the athletic program at Alabama.

During its tenure as the team's home field, Alabama amassed an overall record of 43 wins to only 2 losses. It was replaced by Denny Stadium, in 1929. The stadium is now known as Bryant–Denny Stadium after the state legislature added longtime head coach and alumnus Paul "Bear" Bryant to the stadium's name in 1975.
