= State Field =

Former stadium of LSU

- Interactive map of State Field
- Location: Baton Rouge, Louisiana
- Coordinates: 30°27′16.06″N 91°11′20.07″W
- Owner: Louisiana State University
- Operator: Louisiana State University
- Surface: Grass

Construction
- Opened: 1893
- Closed: 1924

Tenants
- LSU Tigers football (NCAA) (1893–1924); LSU Tigers baseball (1893–1924); LSU Tigers basketball (1908–1924)

State Field was the home stadium of the Louisiana State University Tigers football team prior to 1924. The field was built on the old downtown campus of LSU. It was located east of the Pentagon Barracks and at the site of the current Louisiana State Capitol Building. Prior to construction of State Field, football games were played on an area called the parade grounds which was located south of the Pentagon Barracks and west of Hill Memorial Library and George Peabody Hall. The field, known on the campus simply as the "athletic field", was later moved to a site with bleachers that was north of the campus' experimental garden, and next to the old armory building. The field was also used for LSU's baseball and basketball teams. From 1894 to 1910 State Field was located on the Old Parade Grounds south of the Pentagon barracks. The football team's record during that time was 39–9–1. From 1911 to 1916, the field was located in the field and bleachers north of the Pentagon Barracks. The football record during this time frame was 21–3–1. The final incarnation of State Field was located next to the Armory from 1917 to November 15, 1924. The record at this final field was 23–8.

== LSU football ==
LSU's first home game was played at State Field on December 3, 1894, against the University of Mississippi (Ole Miss). The contest resulted in a 26–6 loss to Ole Miss. LSU's last home game at State Field was on November 15, 1924, against Northwestern State. LSU won this game by a score of 40–0. LSU moved to the newly opened Tiger Stadium the next week in a game against Tulane on November 27, 1924. During the 31 years that State Field was used as LSU's home field, 105 home games were played there. LSU's record at State Field was 83–20–2. During most of State Field's existence, it was used only for smaller games. Larger games were played at a baseball park in New Orleans that could accommodate around 5,000 spectators. A good crowd at State Field was only about 1,000 fans. In 1911, State Field got upgraded by the addition of a wooden grandstand that would hold 250 fans. Most of the fans attending home games at State Field at the time were still accustomed to standing room only. In 1917, State Field was moved across the street to where the current Louisiana State Capitol building is located. A wooden grandstand that held 7,000 spectators was installed that year. The seating was built using funds donated by a fan, H.V. Moseley.

== LSU baseball ==
On May 13, 1893, LSU played its first baseball game versus Tulane University. The game resulted in a victory for LSU. From 1893 to 1924 LSU baseball played 388 games at State Field with LSU having a 192-184-12 record.

== LSU basketball ==
The LSU basketball team played at State Field.

== Gallery ==
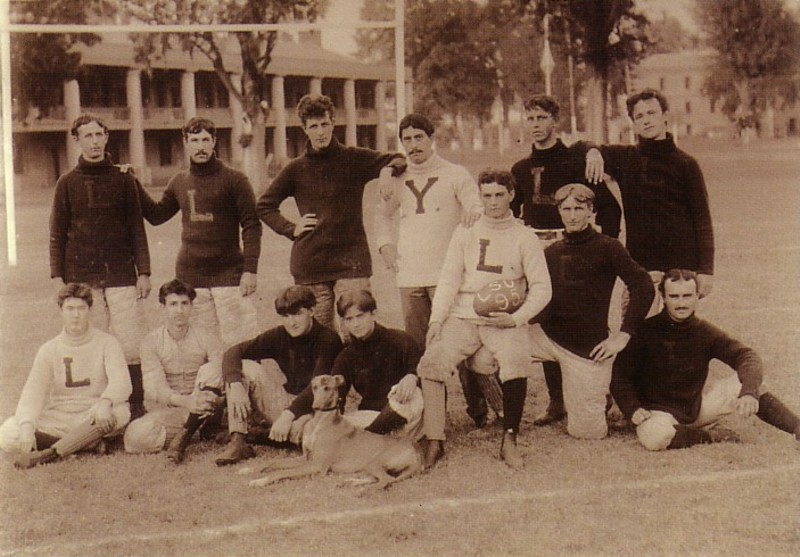
1895 LSU Football team played at State Field

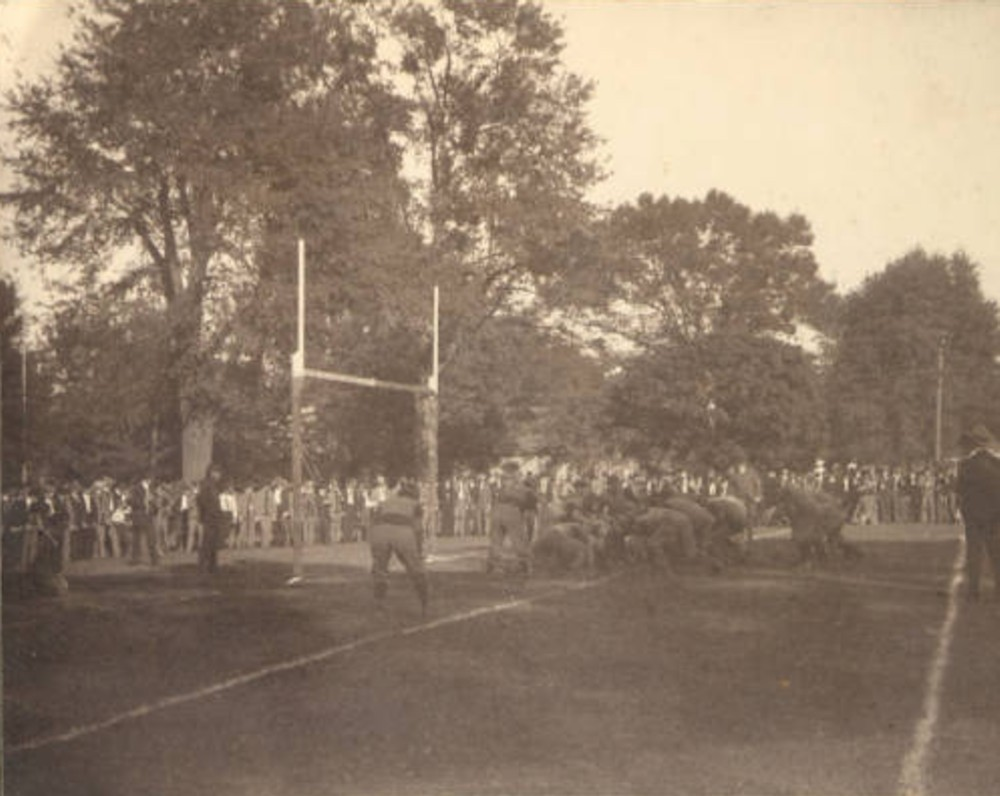
Players on goal line in 1902 LSU vs. Auburn game at State Field

1900 LSU Baseball team played at State Field

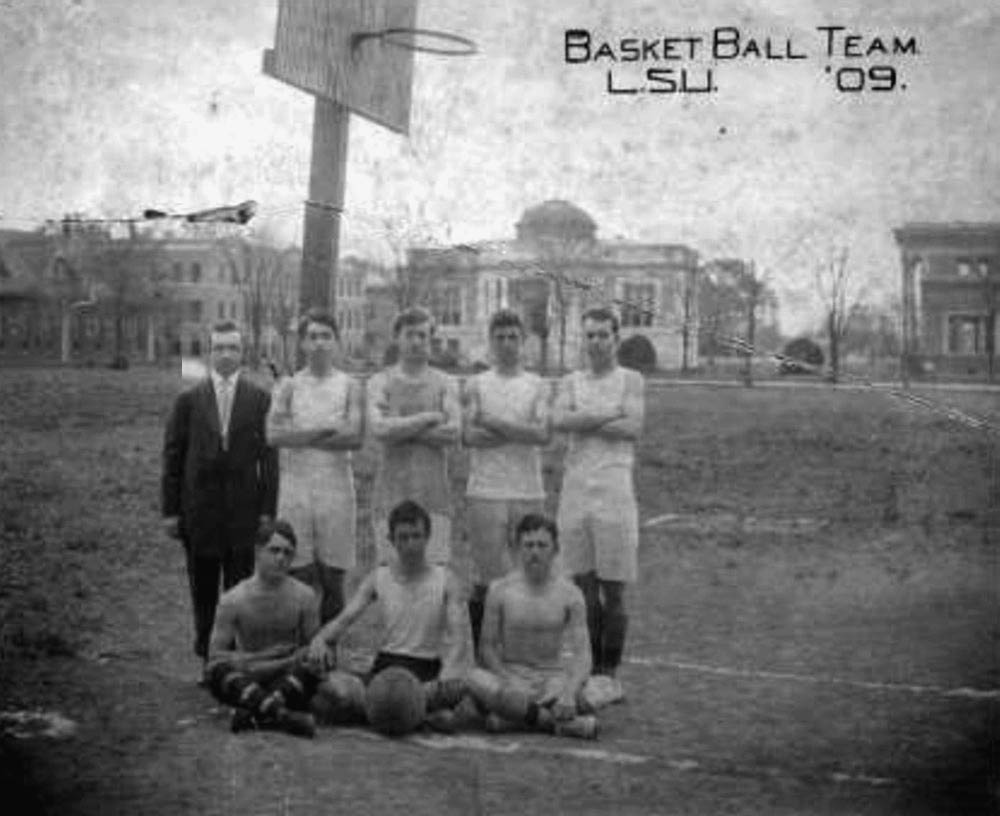
1909 LSU Basketball team at State Field

== See also ==
- LSU Tigers and Lady Tigers
