= 1920 College Football All-Southern Team =

American all-star college football team

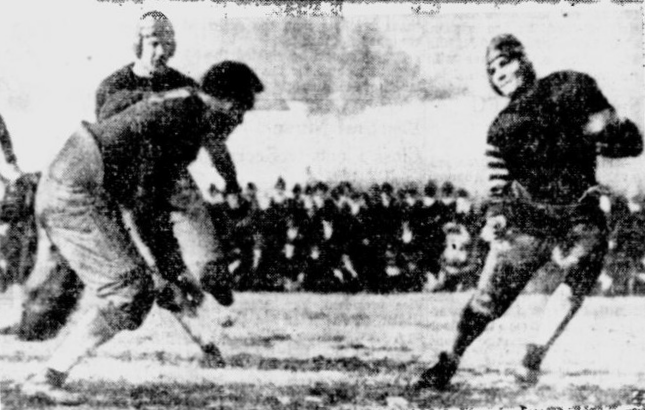
Georgia v. Alabama. Artie Pew is attempting to tackle Riggs Stephenson. Behind Pew is Puss Whelchel.

The 1920 College Football All-Southern Team consists of American football players selected to the College Football All-Southern Teams selected by various organizations for the 1920 Southern Intercollegiate Athletic Association football season.

Georgia and Georgia Tech both had claims to the SIAA championship.

== Composite eleven ==
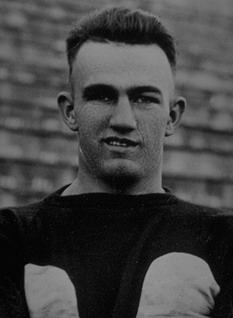
Bill Fincher of Georgia Tech was a near unanimous selection.

The composite All-Southern eleven formed by the selection of 27 coaches and sporting writers culled by the Atlanta Constitution and Atlanta Journal included:

- Red Barron, halfback for Georgia Tech, also an All-Southern baseball player who played pro ball with the Boston Braves. He later coached high school football.
- Noah Caton, center for Auburn, died just two years later due to complications from an appendicitis operation.
- Bum Day, center for Georgia, in 1918 as a player for Georgia Tech was the first Southern player selected first-team All-American by Walter Camp.
- Bill Fincher, tackle for Georgia Tech, a unanimous selection and this year the third Southern player selected first-team All-American by Walter Camp, inducted into the College Football Hall of Fame in 1974. He also kicked.
- Buck Flowers, halfback for Georgia Tech, inducted into the College Football Hall of Fame in 1955. He was selected for the Associated Press Southeast Area All-Time football team 1869–1919 era. He also kicked.
- Bo McMillin, quarterback for Centre, the second Southern player selected first-team All-American by Walter Camp, inducted into the College Football Hall of Fame in 1951.
- Artie Pew, tackle for Georgia, member of teams which over two years (1920 and 1921) did not lose to a single southern opponent. He also kicked. Pew was also a basketball player.
- Owen Reynolds, end for Georgia, played for the New York Giants in the inaugural season of 1925.
- John Staton, end for Georgia Tech, later a Coca-Cola executive.
- Riggs Stephenson, fullback for Alabama, later played professional baseball for the Cleveland Indians and Chicago Cubs.
- Fatty Warren, guard for Auburn. He also kicked.

== Composite overview ==
Bill Fincher received the most votes with 26.

Name	Position	School	First-team selections
Bill Fincher	End/Tackle	Georgia Tech	26
Red Barron	Halfback	Georgia Tech	25
Bo McMillin	Quarterback	Centre	23
Buck Flowers	Halfback	Georgia Tech	23
Bum Day	Center	Georgia	18
Owen Reynolds	End	Georgia	18
Artie Pew	Tackle	Georgia	17
Riggs Stephenson	Fullback	Alabama	17
Fatty Warren	Guard	Auburn	11
John Staton	End	Georgia Tech	7
Noah Caton	Guard	Auburn	7
Puss Whelchel	Guard	Georgia	7
Terry Snoddy	End	Centre	6
Yen Lightsey	Guard	Clemson	6
Georgie Ratterman	End	Georgia Tech	5
Al Clemens	End	Alabama	5
Emmett Sizemore	Guard	Auburn	5
Dummy Lebey	Guard	Georgia Tech	4
Tram Sessions	Guard	Alabama	4
Buck Hatcher	Tackle	Tennessee	4
Bill James	Tackle	Centre	3
Noisy Grisham	Guard	Auburn	3
Sully Montgomery	Tackle	Centre	2
Albert Staton	Tackle	Georgia Tech	2
Speedy Speer	Quarterback	Furman	1+
Frank Stubbs	Quarterback	Auburn	1+
Buck Cheves	Quarterback	Georgia	1+
Ed Sherling	Fullback	Auburn	1+
Judy Harlan	Fullback	Georgia Tech	1+
Oscar Davis	Guard	Georgia Tech	1
Manning Jeter	Guard	Furman	1
James Pearce	Guard	Auburn	1
Joe Bennett	Guard	Georgia	1
Gink Hendrick	Guard	Vanderbilt	1
Red Weaver	Center	Centre	1

== All-Southerns of 1920 ==
=== Ends ===
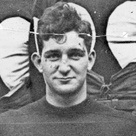
John Staton of Georgia Tech.

- Owen Reynolds, Georgia (C, FA, CM, S, JD, D, MB, BD, ED, BH, ZN, BAH, JLR, CW, HG, CEB, BP, UT)
- John Staton, Georgia Tech (C, MB, KS)
- Terry Snoddy, Centre (C, WGF, BH, SM, ZN, HLL, JLR, CR)
- Georgie Ratterman, Georgia Tech (C, FA, CM, BD, WGF)
- Al Clemens, Alabama (C, X, ED, CW, CEB)
- John Shirey, Auburn (X, D, BAH)
- Dicky White, Tulane (KS, HLL)
- M. C. Billingsley, Mississippi A&M (UT)

=== Tackles ===
- Bill Fincher*†, Georgia Tech (College Football Hall of Fame) (C, FA, CM, X, S, JD, D, MB, BD, ED, WGF, BH, SM, ZN, KS, HLL, BAH, JLR, CR, CW, HG, CEB, BP)
- Artie Pew, Georgia (C, FA, CB, S, JD, MB, BD, ED, WGF, HLL [as g], BAH [as g], JLR, CW, HG, CEB, BP)
- Buck Hatcher, Tennessee (C, KS, HLL, UT)
- Bill James, Centre (C, CM [as g], BD [as g], ZN)
- Sully Montgomery, Centre (C, SM, JLR, CR)
- Al Staton, Georgia Tech (C, S [as e], JD [as e], BAH, BP [as e])

=== Guards ===
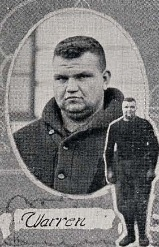
Fatty Warren of Auburn.

- Fatty Warren, Auburn (C, CM, X, JD, D [as t], BD, BH, SM, JLR, CR, S)
- Puss Whelchel, Georgia (C, X, D, BH, ZN, HG, BP)
- Yen Lightsey, Clemson (C, X [as t], S, JD, BD, BH [as t], UT)
- Emmett Sizemore, Auburn (C, KS, HLL)
- Dummy Lebey, Georgia Tech (C, FA, BAH)
- Tram Sessions, Alabama (C, MB, WGF, ZN)
- Noisy Grisham, Auburn (C, ED, CW, BP)
- Oscar Davis, Georgia Tech (C)
- Manning Jeter, Furman (C, S)
- James Pearce, Auburn (C)
- Joe Bennett, Georgia (C)
- Gink Hendrick, Vanderbilt (C, FA, SM [as e], KS, CR [as e], UT [as t])
- Sidney Johnston, Alabama (D, CEB, UT)

=== Centers ===
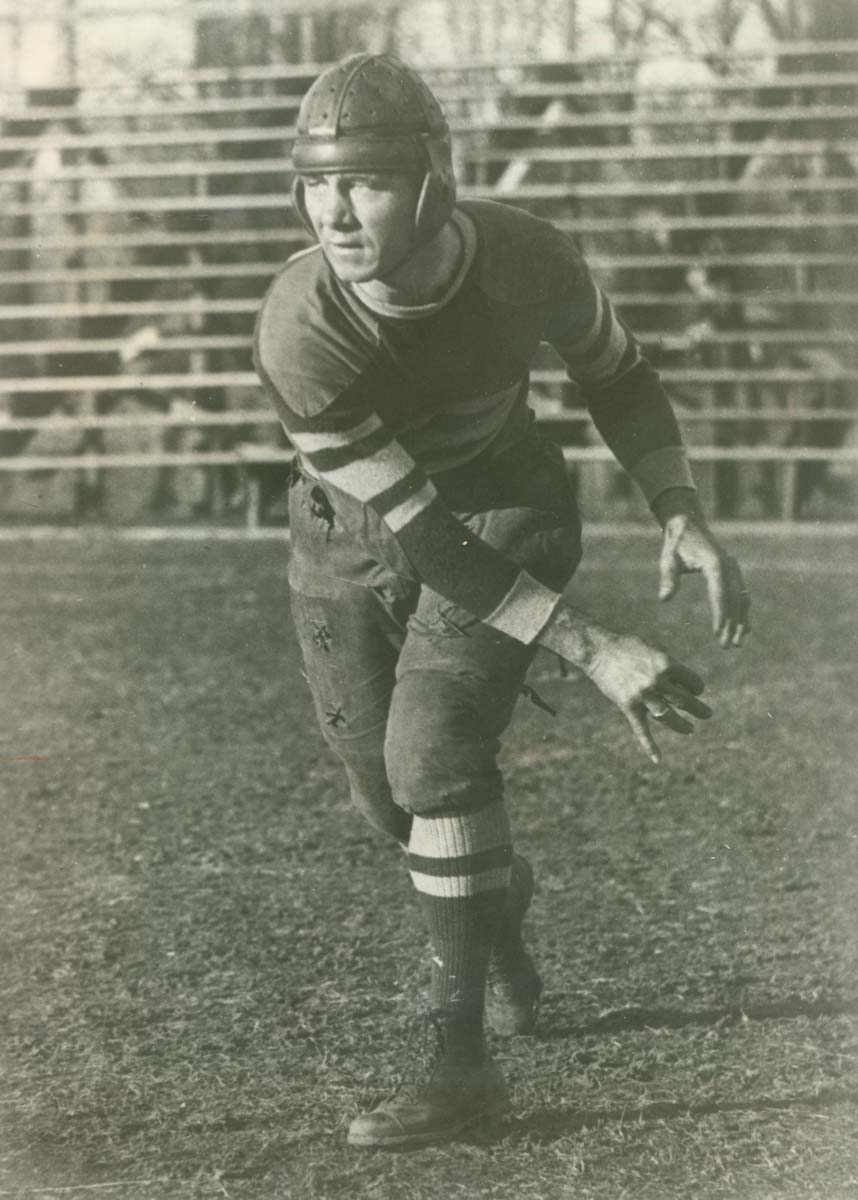
Bo McMillin of Centre College.

- Bum Day, Georgia (C, FA, CM, S, JD, MB, WGF, BH, SM-as guard, KS, HLL, CR-as guard, CW, HG, CEB)
- Noah Caton, Auburn (C [as g], X, D, MB [as g], ED, WGF [as g], ZN, BAH, CW [as g], HG [as g], CEB [as g], BP, S [as g])
- Red Weaver, Centre, (C, BD, SM, CR, UT)

=== Quarterbacks ===
- Bo McMillin, Centre (College Football Hall of Fame) (C, FA, CM, X, S, JD, MB, BD, ED, WGF, BH, SM, ZN, KS, HLL, JLR, CR, CW, HG, CEB, BP, UT)
- Speedy Speer, Furman (C)
- Frank Stubbs, Auburn (C, D)
- Buck Cheves, Georgia (C)

=== Halfbacks ===
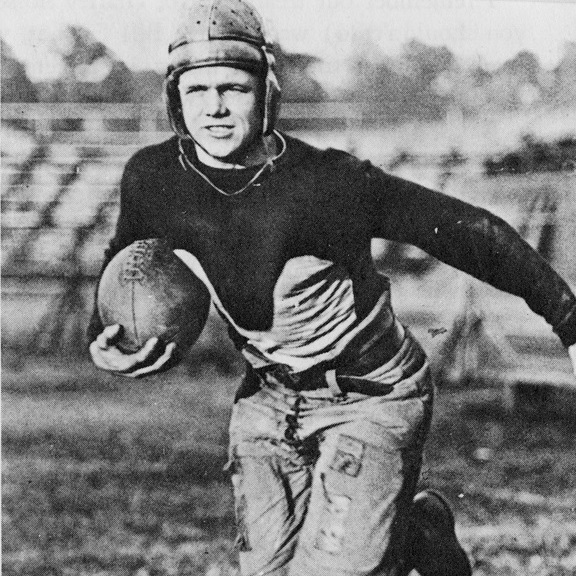
Buck Flowers of Georgia Tech.

- Red Barron, Georgia Tech (C, FA, CM, X, S, JD, D, MB, ED, WGF, BH, SM, KS, HLL, BAH, JLR, CR, CW, HG, CEB, BP, UT)
- Buck Flowers, Georgia Tech (College Football Hall of Fame) (C, FA, CM, MB, BD, ED, WGF, BH, SM, ZN, KS, HLL, BAH [as qb], JLR, CR, CW, HG, CEB, BP, UT [as fb], S)
- Mullie Lenoir, Alabama (X, SM [as fb], CR [as fb])
- Reuben Blair, Tennessee (UT)

=== Fullbacks ===
- Riggs Stephenson, Alabama (C, X, S [as hb], JD, D [as hb], BD [as hb], WGF, BH, ZN [as hb], KS, HLL, BAH [as hb], JLR, HG [as e], S)
- Ed Sherling, Auburn (C, FA, CM, S, JD [as hb], D, BD, ZN, BAH, BP)
- Judy Harlan, Georgia Tech (C, MB, ED, CW, HG, CEB)

== Key ==
Bold = Composite selection

* = Consensus All-American

† = Unanimous selection

C = composite All-SIAA selection of 27 coaches and sporting writers culled by the Atlanta Constitution and Atlanta Journal.

FA = selected by Frank Anderson, coach at Oglethorpe University.

CM = selected by Charley Moran, coach at Centre College.

X = selected by Xen C. Scott, coach at the University of Alabama.

S = selected by H. J. Stegeman, coach at University of Georgia.

JD = selected by James DeHart, assistant coach at University of Georgia.

D = selected by Mike Donahue, coach at Auburn University.

MB = selected by Morgan Blake, sports editor for the Atlanta Journal.

BD = selected by Bruce Dudley, sports editor for the Louisville Herald.

ED = selected by Ed Danforth, sports editor for the Atlanta Georgian.

WGF = selected by W. G. Foster, sports editor for the Chattanooga Times, along with S. J. McAllister, coach and official.

BH = selected by Blinkey Horn, sports editor for the Nashville Tennessean.

SM = selected by Sam H. McMeekin of the Louisville Courier-Journal.

ZN = selected by Zipp Newman, sports editor for the Birmingham News.

KS = selected by the Knoxville Sentinel.

HLL = selected by H. L. Lesbon of the Knoxville Journal and Tribune.

BAH = selected by the Birmingham Age-Herald.

JLR = selected by J. L. Ray of the Nashville Banner.

CR = selected by Charles Rinehart, sports editor for the Louisville Courier-Journal.

CW = selected by Cliff Wheatley, sports editor for the Atlanta Constitution.

HG = selected by Homer George.

CEB = selected by C. E. Baker of the Macon Telegraph.

BP = selected by Boozer Pitts, assistant at Auburn.

UT = selected by University of Tennessee student publication "Pigskin Number."

== See also ==
- 1920 College Football All-America Team
