= Georgia–Vanderbilt football rivalry =

American college football rivalry

- Georgia Bulldogs Vanderbilt Commodores
- First meeting: November 7, 1893; Vanderbilt, 35–0
- Latest meeting: October 3, 2026; Georgia, 38–14
- Next meeting: 2028

Statistics
- Total meetings: 84
- All-time series: Georgia leads, 62–20–2
- Largest victory: Georgia, 62–0 (2021)
- Longest win streak: Georgia, 11 (1974–1984, 1995–2005)
- Current win streak: Georgia 7, (2017–present)

Locations of Georgia and Vanderbilt

The Georgia–Vanderbilt football rivalry is an American college football rivalry between the Georgia Bulldogs and Vanderbilt Commodores. Both universities are founding members of the Southeastern Conference (SEC), with a total of 84 meetings. This rivalry is both Georgia and Vanderbilt's fourth longest football rivalry. Georgia leads the series 62–20–2.

== Notable games ==
=== 1893: First game ===
In the first meeting between the two rivals in 1893, Vanderbilt played a "scientific game" and outweighed Georgia, winning 35–0.

=== 1895: Vandy wins on a fumble ===
Georgia's Pomeroy fumbled and Vanderbilt's Elliott recovered the fumble and scored a touchdown. Georgia protested that Pomeroy was down, and coach Pop Warner took his team from the field in protest.

=== 1898: Georgia's first win ===
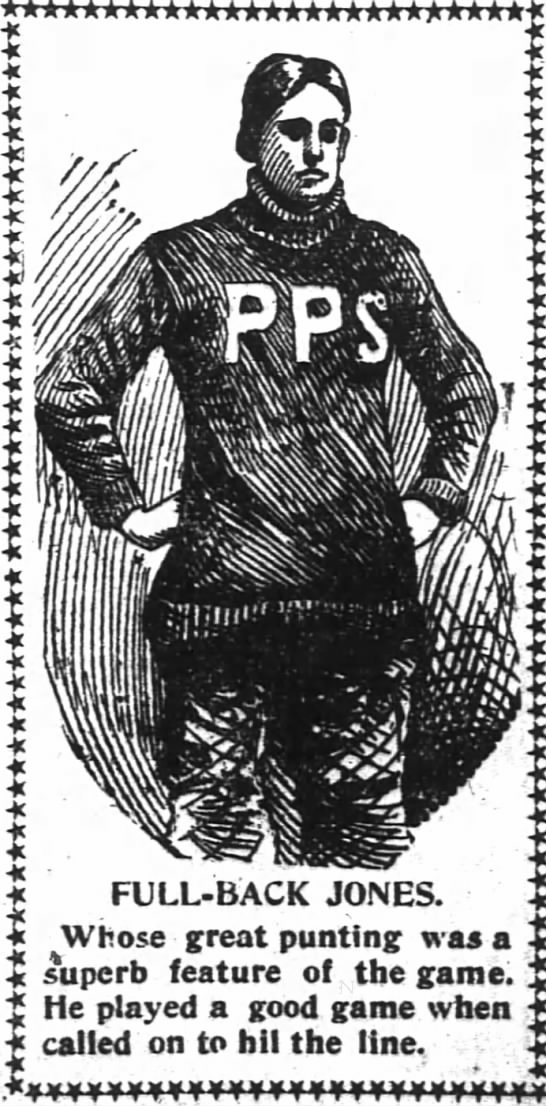
Kit Jones of Georgia, a renowned punter.

Prior to the game, the bets were 2 to 1 that Georgia would not score. In front of 2,000 fans at Piedmont Park in Atlanta, the Bulldogs beat the Commodores for the first ever time, 4 to 0. The score came on a run by Georgia back F. K. McCutcheon. At one point Vanderbilt disputed a John Edgerton fumble, and threatened to leave the field until Georgia's captain Walden said he would withdraw his men from the game if the decision were reversed. Georgia quarterback Kid Huff saved a touchdown when he tackled and forced a fumble from the big Wallace Crutchfield of Vanderbilt. The punting of Georgia fullback Kit Jones featured throughout.

=== 1901: Frank Kyle stars ===
Vanderbilt's largest victory in the history of the rivalry was in 1901, 47–0, when Frank Kyle ran for 238 yards.

=== 1903: Coach arrested ===
Vanderbilt won easily 33–0, utilizing end runs, but a fight between Georgia player Harold Ketron and Vanderbilt coach J. R. Henry resulted in Henry being arrested.

=== 1911: McGugin vs. Cunningham ===
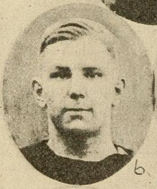
Lew Hardage

The SIAA champion Vanderbilt Commodores defeated the Georgia Bulldogs 17–0 under a "cold, leaden sky" with splashes of rain. Coaching the Bulldogs was Dan McGugin product Alex Cunningham. Ammie Sikes scored once and Ray Morrison scored twice, once after Lew Hardage set up a drive with a 45-yard run.

=== 1912: Vanderbilt wins at Poncy ===
The SIAA champion 1912 Vanderbilt Commodores easily defeated the Georgia Bulldogs 46–0 in the rain. The game was played on the infield and part of the right outfield of Ponce de Leon Park. According to Vanderbilt University Quarterly, the score would have been higher but for the water and mud. Georgia Hall of Fame star Bob McWhorter was held in check; his best run went for 12 yards.

As reported by the Atlanta Constitution: First Collins would circle one end for 10 to 30 yards, then right back around the other flank would dash Hardage for a similar gain. While the Georgia players knew full well who would carry the ball, they could not get through Vanderbilt's interference, and if they did it was only to allow the elusive Hardage or Collins to step through their arms or dodge them completely."

=== 1921: Onside Kick from Scrimmage ties SIAA Championship ===
The Georgia Bulldogs won the SIAA championship in the prior year of 1920. The toughest Southern opponent left for either school, both with undefeated conference records, the Georgia-Vanderbilt game would decide the SIAA title. Georgia was the favorite to win this first meeting of the two schools since 1912, in part because the Bulldogs may have outplayed Harvard and defeated Auburn earlier in 1921. Georgia had the greatest line in the South, featuring four All-Southern linemen by the names of Puss Whelchel, Bum Day, Owen Reynolds, and Artie Pew. Not one team all year scored on Georgia through its line. Vanderbilt at this point was 6–1 against Georgia all time, the score all time was 184 to 4 in the Commodores' favor.

The first score came after a punt from the Commodores was returned by Georgia some 15 yards to around Vanderbilt's 30-yard line. The Bulldogs would complete an 18-yard pass from Hartley to halfback Jim Tom Reynolds, to Vanderbilt's 12-yard line. Three punches at the line were stopped for short gains. Hartley gained five yards and Vanderbilt was penalized for offsides. Three line bucks netted three yards. Jim Reynolds, gaining a yard or so, went over for the touchdown with a counter on the following series. It was such a close call that it brought forth considerable argument. Pew kicked goal. The half ended with Georgia gaining 113 yards on offense to Vanderbilt's 9.

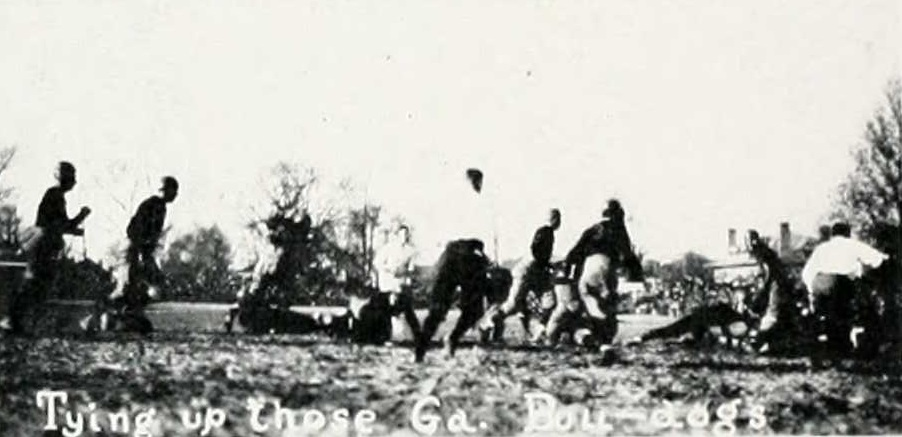
Snapshot from the game.

Soon after the start of the fourth quarter, Jess Neely intercepted a pass, weaving for a return of 25 yards to Georgia's 40-yard line before being brought down by Jim Reynolds. Two long pass attempts failed, and Thomas Ryan lined up to punt. Rupert Smith snuck in behind Ryan, and rushed to recover the 25-yard onside kick, jumping up to get the ball off the bounce among a hoard of Bulldogs, after they had let it bounce, including the outstretched arms of the Bulldogs' Hartley, and raced for a 15-yard touchdown. Rupert added his own extra point and the game ended as a tie, 7–7. Georgia would go on to beat both Alabama and Clemson handily in the following weeks, while the next week Vanderbilt handled Sewanee in the mud, giving both Vanderbilt and Georgia an equal right to the claim of a 1921 SIAA title. A freshman Lynn Bomar's play at the linebacker position was especially noted, "Georgia would have trampled Vanderbilt to atoms but for Lynn Bomar," observed Nashville Tennessean sportswriter Blinkey Horn. It was said he stopped five Georgia touchdowns that day. One source credits this as the first successful onside kick in the history of football.

=== 1923: "Dixie's top team" licked by Commodores ===
On November 17, the Vanderbilt Commodores beat the Georgia Bulldogs at Dudley Field by a lopsided score of 35 to 7. Fred Russell would say this was when "the Gold and Black hit the season's peak." Morgan Blake, sportswriter in the Atlanta Journal, wrote "No southern team has given the Georgia Bulldogs such a licking in a decade." Georgia was labeled "Dixie's top team;" its only loss coming against traditional powerhouse Yale. Georgia's defense had previously shut out all its Southern Conference opponents, with no southern team crossing the Bulldogs' 20 or 25 yard line. Vanderbilt halfback Gil Reese would star in this game, including two punt returns for touchdowns and two more touchdowns on the ground. Reese ran for over 200 yards for the second week in a row, with 232 yards on his five largest plays and over 300 total yards. Former Vanderbilt coach Wallace Wade, who was at the game scouting Georgia, said the Commodores that day were "the smartest I ever saw."

=== 1924: Georgia wins, Lynn Bomar injured ===
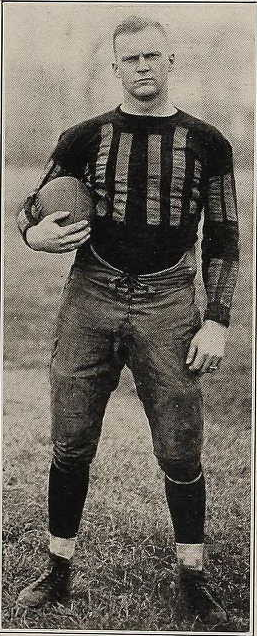
Hall of famer Lynn Bomar suffered a career ending injury against Georgia.

1924 brought the first victory for Georgia over Vanderbilt in twenty-seven "long years," having failed to win the last seven matches. The Commodores did well in the first quarter, but never threatened again after that. Georgia had 12 first downs to Vandy's 7, and the Bulldogs gained 284 yards to the Commodores' 128. The furthest the Commodores penetrated was to Georgia's 31-yard line. Thrice the Bulldogs got to within Vanderbilt's 10-yard line, but all three times the Vanderbilt defense stiffened and prevented a score. Bulldog quarterback "Scrappy" Moore made the 32-yard drop-kick which broke the scoreless tie in the fourth quarter. It was the last field goal kicked by a Bulldog until seventeen years later when Frank Sinkwich did so against Florida with a broken jaw in 1941.

1923 consensus All-American Lynn Bomar suffered an injury this day which would tragically end his career with Vanderbilt football. A kick to the chin from a cleat gave him a severe brain hemorrhage, leaving him with half of his body paralyzed for two days. It was figured he would never play football again. "Not a player on the team could talk of Bomar's injury without tears coming to his eyes." The next year, he would defy the odds and play professional football in the inaugural season for the New York Giants, leaving after 1926 from a different injury.

=== 1925: Georgia upsets Vanderbilt ===
Georgia upset Vanderbilt 26–7, completing 9 of 16 passes with three for touchdowns.

=== 1926: Spears beats Georgia by a point ===
In "one of the most exciting games played on Dudley Field" and "one of the most hectic games ever played" the crowd saw "a succession of climaxes that left the spectators trembling with exhaustion". With two minutes left, Vanderbilt blocked Georgia's punt. Bull Brown blocked Georgia's safety man on a run, and a pass from Bill Spears to Peck Owen got a touchdown. Spears calmly kicked the extra point for the win.

=== 1931: Smith beats Vanderbilt ===
"In a closely fought battle," Vernon Smith rushed Vanderbilt quarterback Tommy Henderson, who always played without a helmet, and made him step out of bounds for a safety. In the third quarter it was still 2-0, and Georgia went for it on fourth down at the 8-yard line. Austin Downes tossed a pass and Smith leaped above several Vanderbilt players to catch the touchdown. Smith also intercepted a pass deep in Georgia territory to end a Vanderbilt drive.

=== 1932: ===
The 1932 Vanderbilt Commodores defeated Georgia 12 to 6. Georgia scored when Joe Grant fumbled a punt, but recovered and ran down the sideline for 71 yards. Vanderbilt engineered the winning drive with 5 minutes left, led by Dixie Roberts and Tommy Henderson.

=== 1973: Vanderbilt stuns Georgia ===
In Steve Sloan's first year as head coach, Vanderbilt kicker Hawkins Golden made four field goals, with two in the last five minutes, and Lonnie Sadler rushed for 109 yards, in an 18–14 upset of Vince Dooley coached Georgia.

=== 1985: Commodores Settle For Tie ===
Vanderbilt tied 16th ranked Georgia 13 to 13.

=== 1991: Vanderbilt upsets Georgia ===
In 1991, Vanderbilt upset No. 18 Georgia 27–25. A key play occurred when Corey Harris picked up a fumble and ran for a touchdown in the third quarter.

=== 2006: Vanderbilt Upsets Georgia On Homecoming ===
The unranked Commodores scored a 33-yard field goal from Bryant Hahnfeldt with 10 seconds to play, which upset the 16th ranked Bulldogs 24–22.

=== 2011: SEC investigation after Georgia win ===
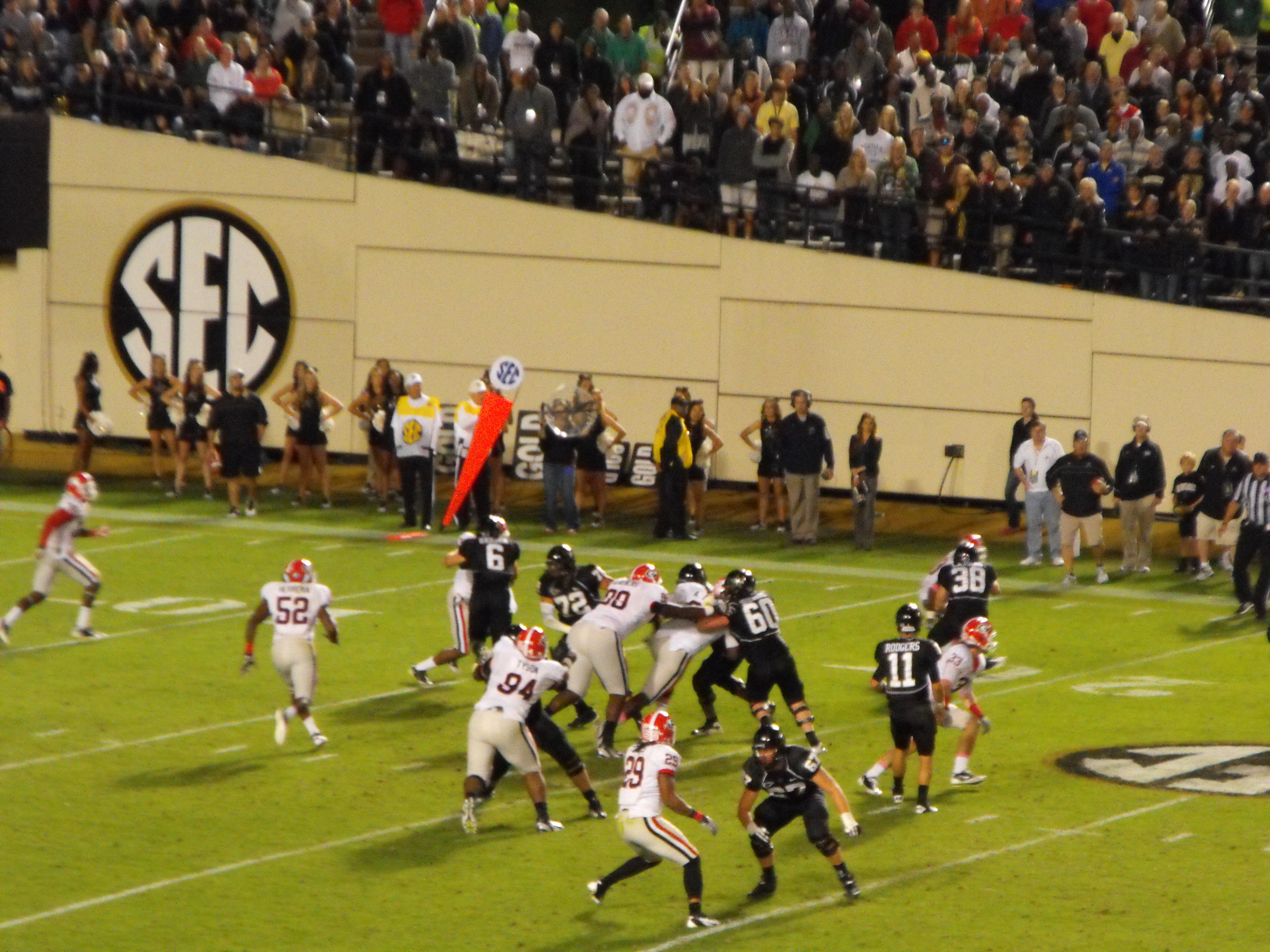
The 2011 game.

Georgia held off Vanderbilt 33 to 28. Aaron Murray threw for a career-high 326 yards and three touchdowns, and Blair Walsh kicked four field goals. Bacarri Rambo deflected the game's final pass with one second left. There was a post game confrontation between coach James Franklin and assistant Todd Grantham causing an SEC investigation.

=== 2013: Franklin upsets Georgia ===
In 2013, under coach James Franklin, Vanderbilt upset #15 Georgia 31 to 27, after trailing 27 to 14 and with an injured quarterback.

=== 2016: Blasingame edges Georgia ===
Vanderbilt defeated Georgia 17–16 on a 2-yard run by Khari Blasingame.

=== 2021: Georgia blows out Vanderbilt ===
The worst defeat in the history of the rivalry was 62–0 in 2021. National champion Georgia scored 35 points in the first quarter alone, and held Vanderbilt to 77 yards all game.

== Game results ==
Series record sources: College Football Data Warehouse.

Georgia victories	Vanderbilt victories	Tie games

No.	Date	Location	Winning team		Losing team	
1	November 7, 1893	Nashville, TN	Vanderbilt	35	Georgia	0
2	November 23, 1895	Nashville, TN	Vanderbilt	6	Georgia	0
3	October 29, 1898	Atlanta, GA	Georgia	4	Vanderbilt	0
4	October 19, 1901	Nashville, TN	Vanderbilt	47	Georgia	0
5	October 31, 1903	Athens, GA	Vanderbilt	33	Georgia	0
6	November 4, 1911	Nashville, TN	Vanderbilt	17	Georgia	0
7	October 19, 1912	Atlanta, GA	Vanderbilt	46	Georgia	0
8	November 13, 1921	Nashville, TN	Tie	7	Tie	7
9	November 18, 1922	Athens, GA	Vanderbilt	12	Georgia	0
10	November 17, 1923	Nashville, TN	Vanderbilt	35	Georgia	7
11	October 25, 1924	Nashville, TN	Georgia	3	Vanderbilt	0
12	October 24, 1925	Athens, GA	Georgia	26	Vanderbilt	7
13	October 23, 1926	Nashville, TN	Vanderbilt	14	Georgia	13
14	October 24, 1931	Athens, GA	Georgia	9	Vanderbilt	0
15	October 22, 1932	Athens, GA	Vanderbilt	12	Georgia	6
16	September 20, 1952	Nashville, TN	Georgia	19	Vanderbilt	7
17	October 16, 1954	Athens, GA	Georgia	16	Vanderbilt	14
18	September 24, 1955	Athens, GA	Georgia	14	Vanderbilt	13
19	September 22, 1956	Nashville, TN	Vanderbilt	14	Georgia	0
20	September 28, 1957	Athens, GA	Vanderbilt	9	Georgia	6
21	September 27, 1958	Nashville, TN	Vanderbilt	21	Georgia	14
22	September 26, 1959	Athens, GA	#17 Georgia	21	Vanderbilt	6
23	September 24, 1960	Nashville, TN	Georgia	18	Vanderbilt	7
24	September 30, 1961	Athens, GA	Vanderbilt	21	Georgia	0
25	September 29, 1962	Nashville, TN	Georgia	10	Vanderbilt	0
26	September 28, 1963	Athens, GA	Georgia	20	Vanderbilt	0
27	September 26, 1964	Nashville, TN	Georgia	7	Vanderbilt	0
28	September 25, 1965	Athens, GA	Georgia	24	Vanderbilt	10
29	October 19, 1968	Athens, GA	#10 Georgia	32	Vanderbilt	6
30	October 18, 1969	Nashville, TN	#14 Georgia	40	Vanderbilt	8
31	October 17, 1970	Athens, GA	Georgia	37	Vanderbilt	3
32	October 16, 1971	Nashville, TN	#8 Georgia	24	Vanderbilt	0
33	October 21, 1972	Athens, GA	Georgia	28	Vanderbilt	3
34	October 20, 1973	Nashville, TN	Vanderbilt	18	Georgia	14
35	October 19, 1974	Athens, GA	Georgia	38	Vanderbilt	31
36	October 18, 1975	Nashville, TN	Georgia	47	Vanderbilt	3
37	October 16, 1976	Athens, GA	#11 Georgia	45	Vanderbilt	0
38	October 15, 1977	Nashville, TN	Georgia	24	Vanderbilt	13
39	October 21, 1978	Athens, GA	#18 Georgia	31	Vanderbilt	10
40	October 20, 1979	Nashville, TN	Georgia	31	Vanderbilt	10
41	October 18, 1980	Athens, GA	#6 Georgia	41	Vanderbilt	0
42	October 17, 1981	Nashville, TN	#9 Georgia	53	Vanderbilt	21
43	October 16, 1982	Athens, GA	#4 Georgia	27	Vanderbilt	13

No.	Date	Location	Winning team		Losing team	
44	October 15, 1983	Nashville, TN	#8 Georgia	20	Vanderbilt	13
45	October 20, 1984	Athens, GA	#14 Georgia	62	Vanderbilt	35
46	October 19, 1985	Nashville, TN	Tie	13	Tie	13
47	October 18, 1986	Athens, GA	Georgia	38	Vanderbilt	16
48	October 17, 1987	Nashville, TN	#18 Georgia	52	Vanderbilt	24
49	October 8, 1988	Athens, GA	#15 Georgia	41	Vanderbilt	22
50	October 21, 1989	Nashville, TN	Georgia	35	Vanderbilt	16
51	October 20, 1990	Athens, GA	Georgia	39	Vanderbilt	28
52	October 19, 1991	Nashville, TN	Vanderbilt	27	#17 Georgia	25
53	October 17, 1992	Athens, GA	#10 Georgia	30	Vanderbilt	20
54	October 16, 1993	Nashville, TN	Georgia	41	Vanderbilt	3
55	October 15, 1994	Athens, GA	Vanderbilt	43	Georgia	30
56	October 14, 1995	Nashville, TN	Georgia	17	Vanderbilt	6
57	October 19, 1996	Athens, GA	Georgia	13	Vanderbilt	2
58	October 18, 1997	Nashville, TN	#19 Georgia	34	Vanderbilt	13
59	October 17, 1998	Athens, GA	#13 Georgia	31	Vanderbilt	6
60	October 16, 1999	Nashville, TN	#14 Georgia	27	Vanderbilt	17
61	October 14, 2000	Athens, GA	#14 Georgia	29	Vanderbilt	19
62	October 13, 2001	Nashville, TN	#19 Georgia	30	Vanderbilt	14
63	October 19, 2002	Athens, GA	#5 Georgia	48	Vanderbilt	17
64	October 18, 2003	Nashville, TN	#4 Georgia	27	Vanderbilt	8
65	October 16, 2004	Athens, GA	#12 Georgia	33	Vanderbilt	3
66	October 15, 2005	Nashville, TN	#5 Georgia	34	Vanderbilt	17
67	October 14, 2006	Athens, GA	Vanderbilt	24	#16 Georgia	22
68	October 13, 2007	Nashville, TN	#24 Georgia	20	Vanderbilt	17
69	October 18, 2008	Athens, GA	#10 Georgia	24	#22 Vanderbilt	14
70	October 17, 2009	Nashville, TN	Georgia	34	Vanderbilt	10
71	October 16, 2010	Athens, GA	Georgia	43	Vanderbilt	0
72	October 15, 2011	Nashville, TN	Georgia	33	Vanderbilt	28
73	September 22, 2012	Athens, GA	#5 Georgia	48	Vanderbilt	3
74	October 19, 2013	Nashville, TN	Vanderbilt	31	#15 Georgia	27
75	October 4, 2014	Athens, GA	#13 Georgia	44	Vanderbilt	17
76	September 12, 2015	Nashville, TN	#10 Georgia	31	Vanderbilt	14
77	October 15, 2016	Athens, GA	Vanderbilt	17	Georgia	16
78	October 7, 2017	Nashville, TN	#5 Georgia	45	Vanderbilt	14
79	October 6, 2018	Athens, GA	#2 Georgia	41	Vanderbilt	13
80	August 31, 2019	Nashville, TN	#3 Georgia	30	Vanderbilt	6
81	September 25, 2021	Nashville, TN	#2 Georgia	62	Vanderbilt	0
82	October 15, 2022	Athens, GA	#1 Georgia	55	Vanderbilt	0
83	October 14, 2023	Nashville, TN	#1 Georgia	37	Vanderbilt	20
84	October 3, 2026	Athens, GA	#2 Georgia	38	Vanderbilt	14
Series: Georgia leads 62–20–2

== See also ==
- List of NCAA college football rivalry games
