= Auburn–Georgia Tech football rivalry =

American college football rivalry

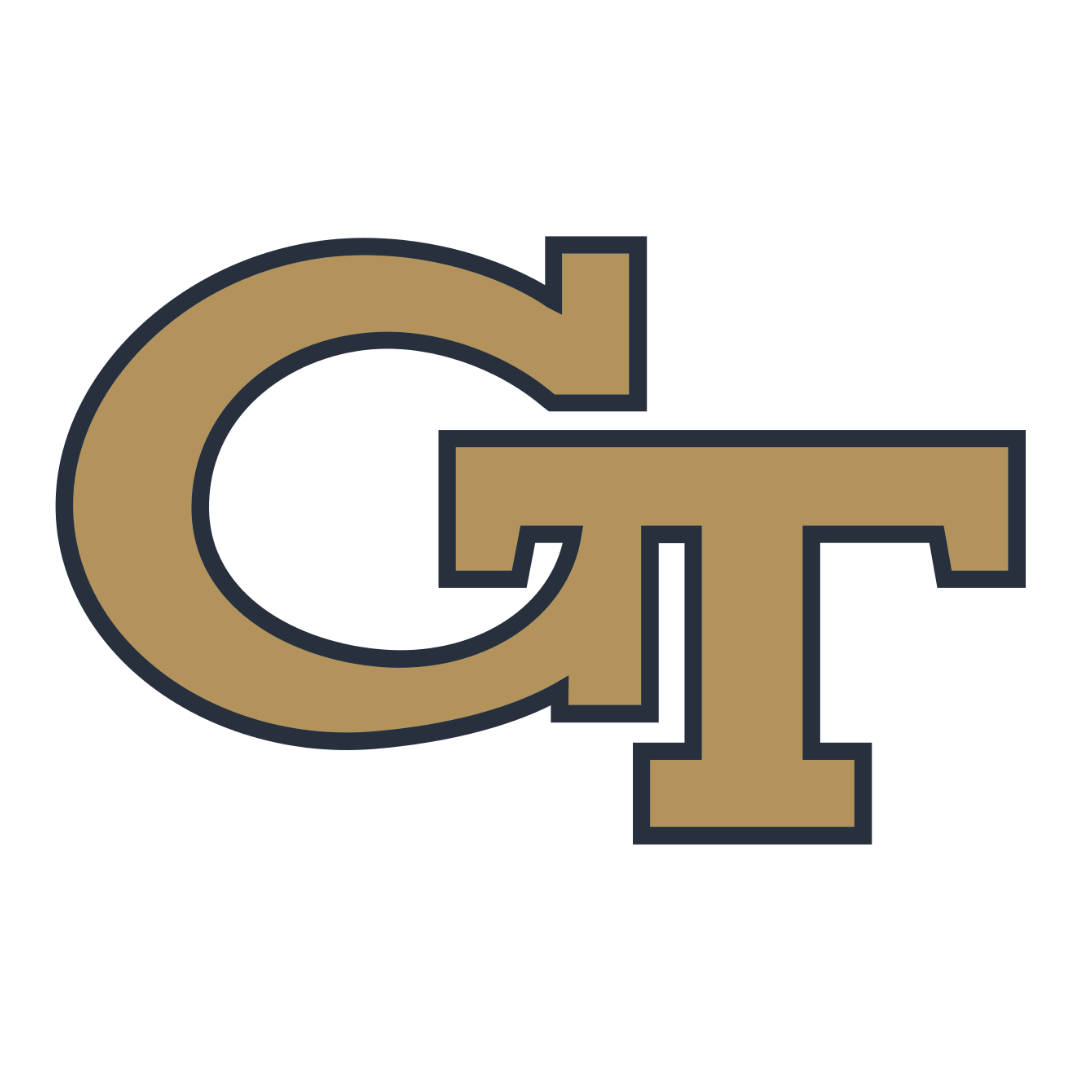
- Auburn Tigers Georgia Tech Yellow Jackets
- First meeting: November 25, 1892; Auburn, 26–0
- Latest meeting: September 3, 2005; Georgia Tech, 23–14
- Next meeting: TBD

Statistics
- Total meetings: 92
- All-time series: Auburn leads, 47–41–4 (.533)
- Largest victory: Auburn, 94–0 (1894)
- Longest win streak: Georgia Tech, 13 (1941–1954)
- Current win streak: Georgia Tech, 2 (2003–present)

Locations of Auburn and Georgia Tech

The Auburn–Georgia Tech football rivalry is an American college football rivalry between the Auburn Tigers and Georgia Tech Yellow Jackets. Auburn leads the series 47–41–4.

== Series history ==
The first game took place on November 25, 1892, in Atlanta, Georgia. They played in the SIAA until it was defunct in 1922, before joining the Southeastern Conference. Georgia Tech left the SEC in 1963, playing as an independent until joining the Atlantic Coast Conference in 1980. Despite no longer being conference opponents, they played annually until 1987. The rivalry was renewed for a home and home series played in 2003 and 2005. There are no future games currently scheduled.

In 1904, Auburn hired Mike Donahue and Tech hired former Auburn coach John Heisman. From 1915 to 1922, the game was pivotal in deciding the SIAA champion.

Sources: 2011 Auburn Football Media Guide

== Notable games ==
=== 1896: The First Wreck Tech Parade ===
Georgia Tech traveled to Auburn for the first time and lost to Auburn 45–0. The night prior to the game, Auburn students greased the railroad tracks coming into Auburn. As a result, the train carrying the Georgia Tech team slid past the Auburn station and traveled 5 miles halfway toward Loachapoka. The Georgia Tech team had to walk the 5 miles back to Auburn. Auburn commemorated this event with the Wreck Tech Pajama Parade prior to playing Georgia Tech.

=== 1908: SIAA champion Auburn defeats Tech ===
Auburn beat Georgia Tech 44–0. Lew Hardage had a 108-yard kickoff return for a touchdown.

=== 1917: Tech's championship team wins easy ===
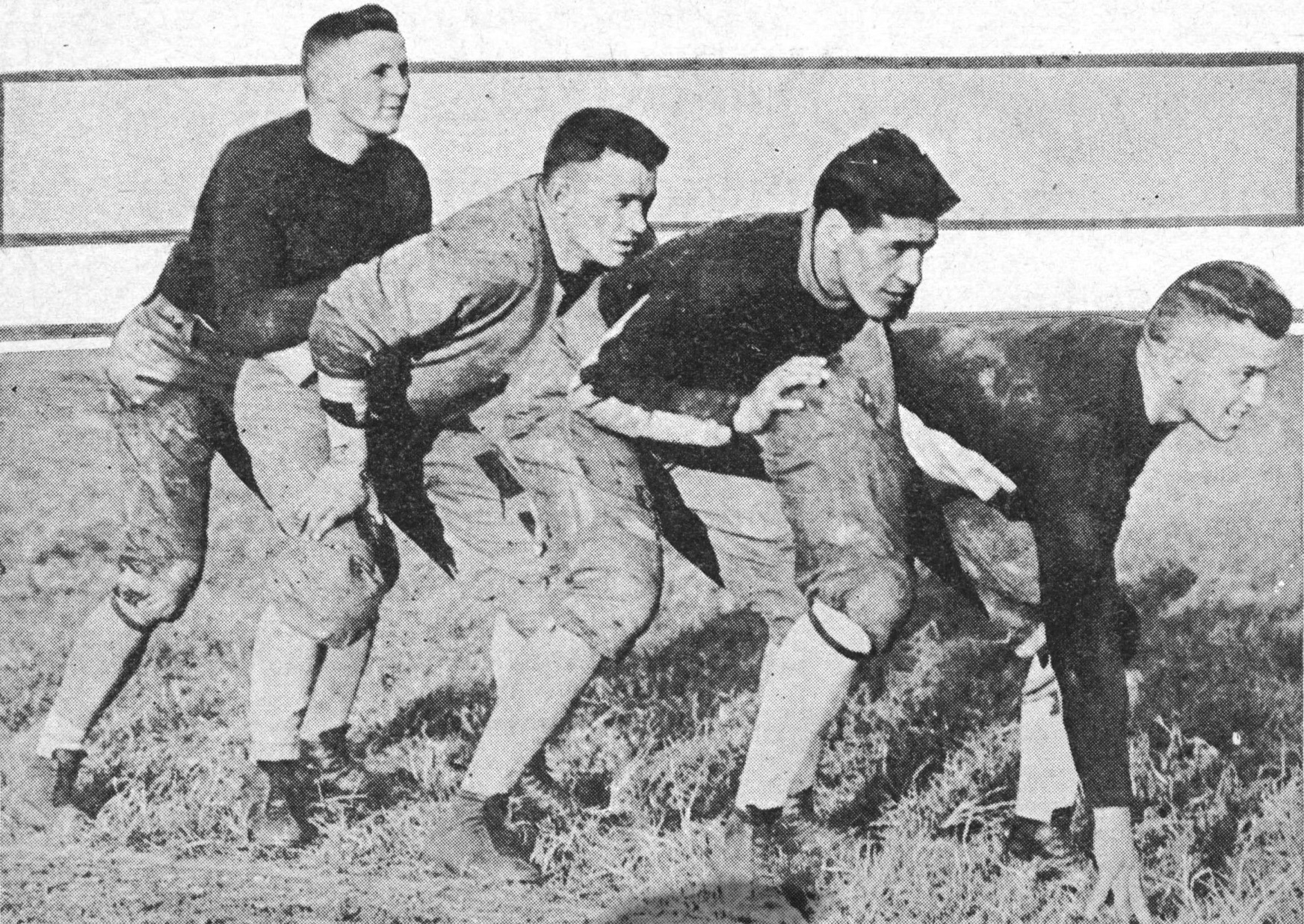
Tech's great backfield.

The 1917 Georgia Tech Golden Tornado were the south's first national champion and for many years considered the greatest team the region ever produced. Heisman considered the 1917 team the best one he ever coached, It finished the season with 68–7 victory over Auburn. Auburn was usually considered second best in the south; the team had lost only to a strong Davidson squad, and held undefeated Big Ten champion Ohio State led by Chic Harley to a scoreless tie the week before the Tech game. Ohio State was favored in the betting booth 4 or 5 to 1. Heisman and his players were at the game, rooting on the Tigers. Moon Ducote starred for Auburn.

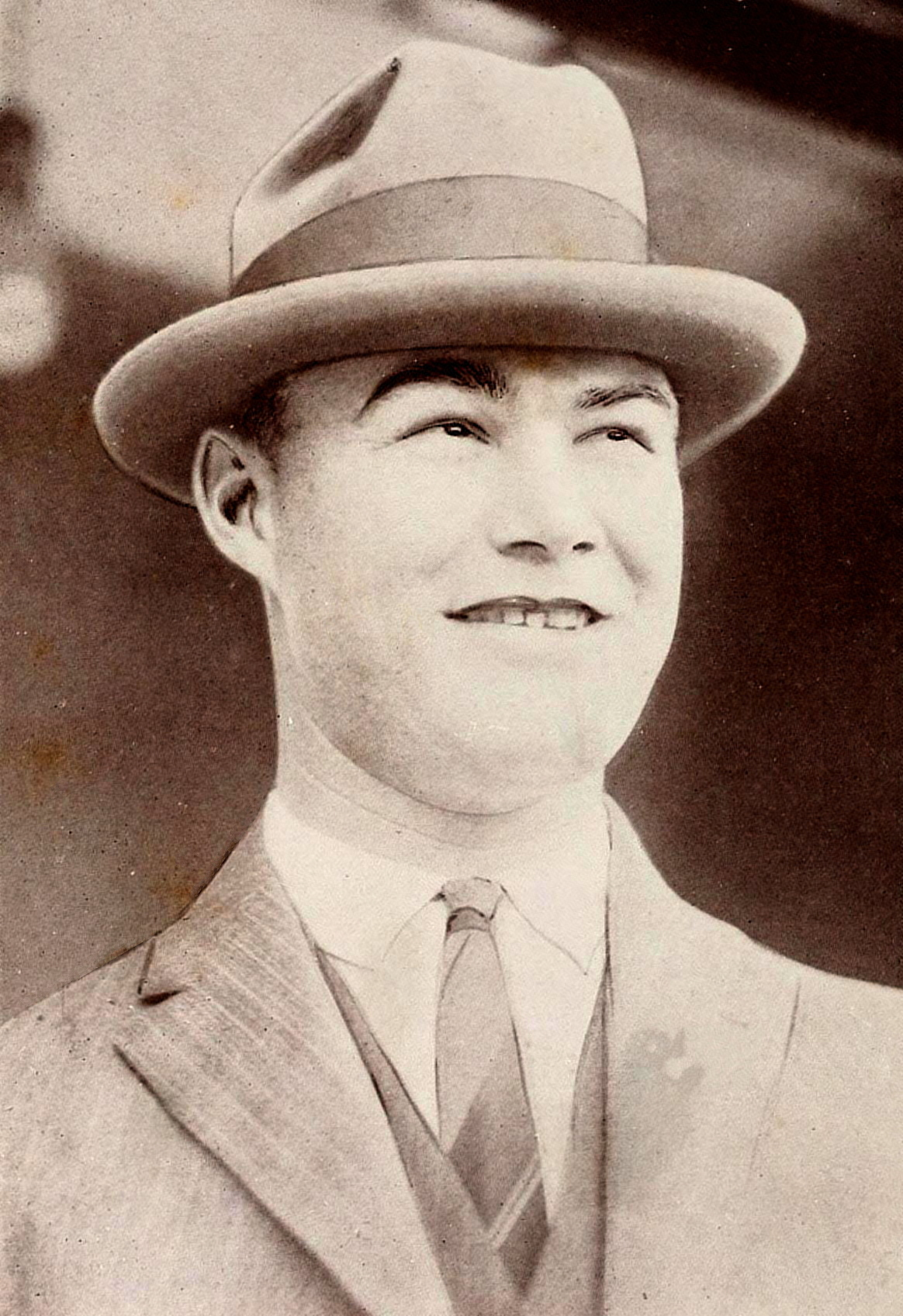
Moon Ducote.

In the game with Auburn, Tech piled up 472 yards on the ground in 84 rushes, and got 145 yards through the air. Joe Guyon racked up four touchdowns. Everett Strupper had a 65-yard touchdown run that drew the following praise from the Atlanta Journal:

"It was not the length of the run that featured it was the brilliance of it. After getting through the first line, Stroop was tackled squarely by two secondary men, and yet he squirmed and jerked loosed from them, only to face the safety man and another Tiger, coming at him from different angles. Without checking his speed Everett knifed the two men completely, running between them and dashing on to a touchdown."

In the second quarter Ducote broke through the line for what seemed like a sure touchdown with the help of the blocking from Pete Bonner and William Donahue. Guyon dove at him and missed, and then raced him down from behind with a showcase of tremendous speed, bringing Ducote down at the 26-yard line. The only Auburn score came when Ducote circled around end for 17 yards and lateraled to Donahue, who ran down the sideline for a 6-yard touchdown. Auburn was considered a strong team despite the large score; Ducote and Bonner were the only players not from Georgia Tech to be selected unanimous All-Southern. Tech's Walker Carpenter and Strupper were the first two players from the Deep South ever selected All-American.

=== 1919: Warren waddles for a TD ===
Auburn's Fatty Warren "waddled" for a 40-yard touchdown off a blocked punt, netting the conference championship and giving Tech its first loss to an SIAA school in five years, since Auburn won in 1914.

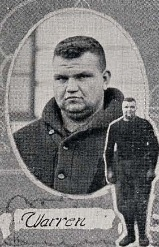
Fatty Warren.

It was John Heisman's last game at Georgia Tech. Zelda Sayre sent All-Southern tackle Pete Bonner a telegram after the defeat of Georgia Tech, it read:

"Shooting a seven, aren’t we awfully proud of the boys, give them my love—knew we could."

She signed it "Zelder Sayre." One account of Bonner's play that day reads, "The Jackets were unable to gain through the Auburn line because of Pete Bonner, giant tackle, who seemed to have a knack of being just where he should have for the best interests of his team."

=== 1920: Please omit Flowers ===
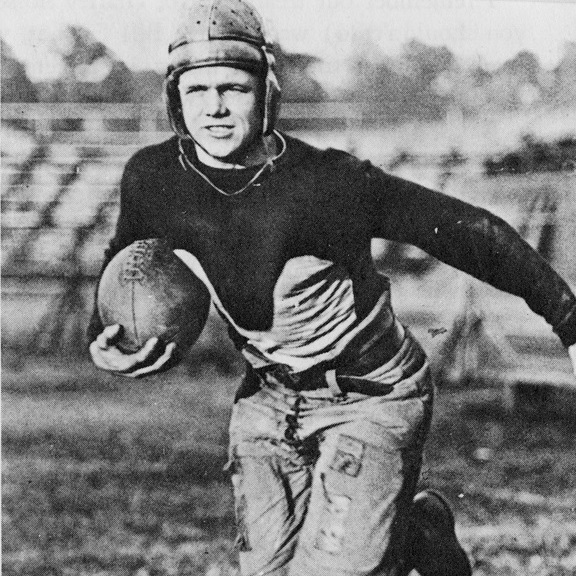
Buck Flowers.

Auburn had a powerful eleven which beat Vanderbilt 56 to 6 to counter Tech's 44 to 0. Some Auburn fans predicted a victory over Tech and the Southern title. On November 25, 1920, Georgia Tech defeated Auburn at Grant Field by a score of 34 to 0 for a share of the SIAA title. Buck Flowers, in his last game, scored three touchdowns, including punt returns of 82 and 65 yards and a 33-yard run from scrimmage, and also passed for a fourth touchdown. Flowers also kicked a punt that went 65 yards in the air against Auburn. Sportswriter Morgan Blake had this to say of Flowers' play against Auburn: "The Auburn Tiger came up with claws sharpened. As he writhed in death agony when the battle was over, he made one request, 'Please omit Flowers'".

The Atlanta Journal wrote that Flowers was "flitting like a phantom, an undulating, rippling, chromatic phantom, over the whitewashed lines". The yearbook remarked Bill Fincher "began his great work on the sand lots of Tech Hi here in Atlanta years ago and ended it up by smearing "Fatty" Warren of the Auburn Tigers all over the flats of Grant Field on Turkey Day last."

=== 1922 ===
The 1922 team is considered one of Auburn's greatest football teams, and they had lost only to undefeated Army. Still Tech held the Tigers without a first down in the second and third periods. Ed Sherling scored Auburn's touchdown on a 16-yard rush.

=== 1987: Tillman, Tillman, Tillman ===
Trailing 10–7 with 4:01 remaining, Auburn took over on its own 9-yard line, needing a touchdown to win the game. Quarterback Jeff Burger led a 14-play drive that he capped off with a four-yard pass to Lawyer Tillman. Aundray Bruce led Auburn's defensive effort with a forced fumble, a recovered fumble, three QB sacks and three interceptions, one that he returned 45 yards for a touchdown.

=== 2003: Grand Reopening ===
It would be 16 years before the Tigers and Yellow Jackets would meet again. Auburn was ranked as high as #3 in the preseason polls. After losing 23–0 at home week one to USC, they fell to #17. Georgia Tech on the other hand was also 0–1. They had lost at BYU 24–13. This game was the first in the expanded Bobby Dodd Stadium. Capacity had been lifted from 43,719 to 55,000. In front of a sold out crowd, Tech’s defense held Auburn to zero touchdowns and 226 yards of offense. Auburn QB Jason Campbell was sacked eight times. Reggie Ball was the first true freshman Quarterback ever to start an opener for Georgia Tech. In his first home start, Ball was 9–21 for 149 yards. The score was 10–3 at halftime. Late in the third quarter, Ball sealed the victory with a 26 yard touchdown pass to Mark Logan. Tech won 17–3. This was the Yellow Jackets first win against Auburn since 1978. After the game, Tech fans rushed the field and tore down the goalposts.

== Game results ==
Auburn victories	Georgia Tech victories	Tie games

No.	Date	Location	Winning team		Losing team	
1	November 25, 1892	Atlanta, GA	Auburn	26	Georgia Tech	0
2	December 7, 1893	Atlanta, GA	Tie	0	Tie	0
3	November 17, 1894	Atlanta, GA	Auburn	94	Georgia Tech	0
4	November 7, 1896	Auburn, AL	Auburn	45	Georgia Tech	0
5	November 5, 1898	Auburn, AL	Auburn	29	Georgia Tech	6
6	October 14, 1899	Auburn, AL	Auburn	63	Georgia Tech	0
7	October 11, 1902	Atlanta, GA	Auburn	18	Georgia Tech	6
8	November 14, 1903	Atlanta, GA	Auburn	10	Georgia Tech	5
9	October 29, 1904	Auburn, AL	Auburn	12	Georgia Tech	0
10	November 3, 1906	Atlanta, GA	Georgia Tech	11	Auburn	0
11	October 26, 1907	Atlanta, GA	Auburn	12	Georgia Tech	6
12	November 7, 1908	Atlanta, GA	Auburn	44	Georgia Tech	0
13	November 6, 1909	Atlanta, GA	Auburn	8	Georgia Tech	0
14	November 5, 1910	Atlanta, GA	Auburn	16	Georgia Tech	0
15	November 4, 1911	Atlanta, GA	Auburn	11	Georgia Tech	6
16	November 2, 1912	Atlanta, GA	Auburn	27	Georgia Tech	7
17	November 8, 1913	Atlanta, GA	Auburn	20	Georgia Tech	0
18	November 7, 1914	Atlanta, GA	Auburn	14	Georgia Tech	0
19	November 25, 1915	Atlanta, GA	Georgia Tech	7	Auburn	0
20	November 30, 1916	Atlanta, GA	Georgia Tech	33	Auburn	7
21	November 29, 1917	Atlanta, GA	Georgia Tech	68	Auburn	7
22	November 28, 1918	Atlanta, GA	Georgia Tech	7	Auburn	0
23	November 27, 1919	Atlanta, GA	Auburn	14	Georgia Tech	7
24	November 25, 1920	Atlanta, GA	Georgia Tech	34	Auburn	0
25	November 24, 1921	Atlanta, GA	Georgia Tech	14	Auburn	0
26	November 30, 1922	Atlanta, GA	Georgia Tech	14	Auburn	6
27	November 29, 1923	Atlanta, GA	Tie	0	Tie	0
28	November 27, 1924	Atlanta, GA	Georgia Tech	7	Auburn	0
29	November 26, 1925	Atlanta, GA	Tie	7	Tie	7
30	November 25, 1926	Atlanta, GA	Georgia Tech	20	Auburn	7
31	November 24, 1927	Atlanta, GA	Georgia Tech	18	Auburn	0
32	November 29, 1928	Atlanta, GA	Georgia Tech	51	Auburn	0
33	November 28, 1929	Atlanta, GA	Georgia Tech	19	Auburn	6
34	October 18, 1930	Atlanta, GA	Georgia Tech	14	Auburn	12
35	October 17, 1931	Atlanta, GA	Auburn	13	Georgia Tech	0
36	October 15, 1932	Atlanta, GA	Auburn	6	Georgia Tech	0
37	October 14, 1933	Atlanta, GA	Georgia Tech	16	Auburn	6
38	November 10, 1934	Atlanta, GA	Auburn	18	Georgia Tech	6
39	November 9, 1935	Atlanta, GA	Auburn	33	Georgia Tech	7
40	November 7, 1936	Atlanta, GA	#20 Auburn	13	Georgia Tech	12
41	October 23, 1937	Atlanta, GA	#20 Auburn	21	Georgia Tech	0
42	October 22, 1938	Atlanta, GA	Georgia Tech	7	Auburn	6
43	October 28, 1939	Atlanta, GA	Georgia Tech	7	Auburn	6
44	October 26, 1940	Atlanta, GA	Auburn	16	Georgia Tech	7
45	October 25, 1941	Atlanta, GA	Georgia Tech	28	Auburn	14
46	September 26, 1942	Atlanta, GA	Georgia Tech	15	Auburn	0
47	October 14, 1944	Atlanta, GA	#10 Georgia Tech	27	Auburn	0

No.	Date	Location	Winning team		Losing team	
48	October 27, 1945	Atlanta, GA	Georgia Tech	20	Auburn	7
49	October 26, 1946	Atlanta, GA	#15 Georgia Tech	27	Auburn	6
50	October 18, 1947	Atlanta, GA	#5 Georgia Tech	27	Auburn	7
51	October 16, 1948	Atlanta, GA	#7 Georgia Tech	27	Auburn	0
52	October 15, 1949	Atlanta, GA	Georgia Tech	35	Auburn	21
53	October 21, 1950	Atlanta, GA	Georgia Tech	20	Auburn	0
54	October 20, 1951	Atlanta, GA	#5 Georgia Tech	27	Auburn	7
55	October 18, 1952	Atlanta, GA	#4 Georgia Tech	33	Auburn	0
56	October 17, 1953	Atlanta, GA	#6 Georgia Tech	36	#19 Auburn	6
57	October 16, 1954	Atlanta, GA	#19 Georgia Tech	28	Auburn	7
58	October 15, 1955	Atlanta, GA	#17 Auburn	14	#5 Georgia Tech	12
59	October 20, 1956	Atlanta, GA	#3 Georgia Tech	28	Auburn	7
60	October 19, 1957	Atlanta, GA	#9 Auburn	3	Georgia Tech	0
61	October 18, 1958	Atlanta, GA	Tie	7	Tie	7
62	October 17, 1959	Atlanta, GA	#11 Auburn	7	#4 Georgia Tech	6
63	October 15, 1960	Birmingham, AL	Auburn	9	#19 Georgia Tech	7
64	October 21, 1961	Atlanta, GA	#8 Georgia Tech	7	Auburn	6
65	October 20, 1962	Birmingham, AL	Auburn	17	Georgia Tech	14
66	October 19, 1963	Atlanta, GA	Auburn	29	#8 Georgia Tech	21
67	October 17, 1964	Birmingham, AL	Georgia Tech	7	Auburn	3
68	October 16, 1965	Atlanta, GA	Georgia Tech	23	Auburn	14
69	October 15, 1966	Birmingham, AL	#7 Georgia Tech	17	Auburn	3
70	October 21, 1967	Atlanta, GA	Auburn	28	Georgia Tech	10
71	October 19, 1968	Birmingham, AL	Georgia Tech	21	Auburn	20
72	October 18, 1969	Atlanta, GA	#15 Auburn	28	Georgia Tech	10
73	October 17, 1970	Auburn, AL	#8 Auburn	31	#16 Georgia Tech	7
74	October 16, 1971	Atlanta, GA	#5 Auburn	31	Georgia Tech	14
75	October 21, 1972	Auburn, AL	#14 Auburn	24	Georgia Tech	14
76	October 20, 1973	Atlanta, GA	Auburn	24	Georgia Tech	10
77	October 19, 1974	Auburn, AL	#5 Auburn	31	Georgia Tech	22
78	October 18, 1975	Atlanta, GA	Auburn	31	Georgia Tech	27
79	October 16, 1976	Auburn, AL	Georgia Tech	28	Auburn	10
80	October 15, 1977	Atlanta, GA	Georgia Tech	38	Auburn	10
81	October 21, 1978	Auburn, AL	Georgia Tech	24	Auburn	10
82	October 20, 1979	Atlanta, GA	#14 Auburn	31	Georgia Tech	27
83	October 18, 1980	Auburn, AL	Auburn	38	Georgia Tech	14
84	October 17, 1981	Atlanta, GA	Auburn	31	Georgia Tech	7
85	October 16, 1982	Auburn, AL	Auburn	24	Georgia Tech	0
86	October 15, 1983	Atlanta, GA	#5 Auburn	31	Georgia Tech	13
87	October 20, 1984	Auburn, AL	#13 Auburn	48	Georgia Tech	34
88	October 19, 1985	Atlanta, GA	#8 Auburn	17	Georgia Tech	14
89	October 18, 1986	Auburn, AL	#7 Auburn	31	Georgia Tech	10
90	October 17, 1987	Atlanta, GA	#5 Auburn	20	Georgia Tech	10
91	September 6, 2003	Atlanta, GA	Georgia Tech	17	#17 Auburn	3
92	September 3, 2005	Auburn, AL	Georgia Tech	23	#16 Auburn	14
Series: Auburn leads 47–41–4

== See also ==
- List of NCAA college football rivalry games
