= 1919 College Football All-Southern Team =

American all-star college football team

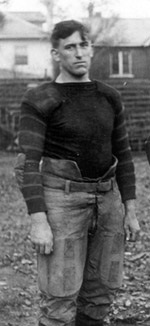
Josh Cody of Vanderbilt was a near unanimous selection.

The 1919 College Football All-Southern Team consists of American football players selected to the College Football All-Southern Teams selected by various organizations for the 1919 Southern Intercollegiate Athletic Association football season.

Auburn won the SIAA championship. Even though Centre went undefeated, there were questions over professionalism.

== Composite eleven ==
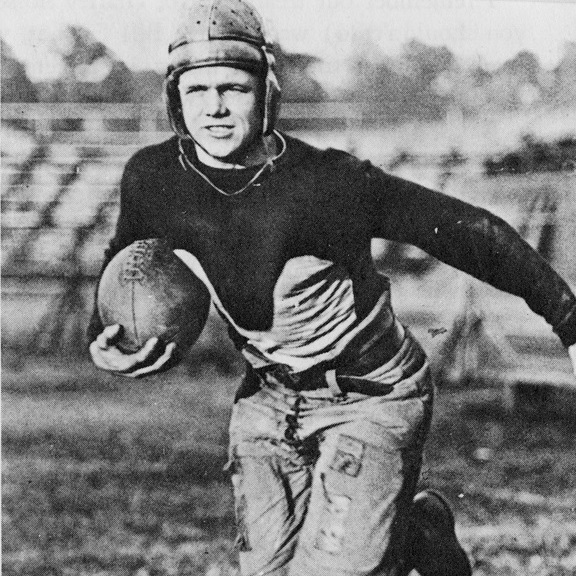
Buck Flowers of Georgia Tech.

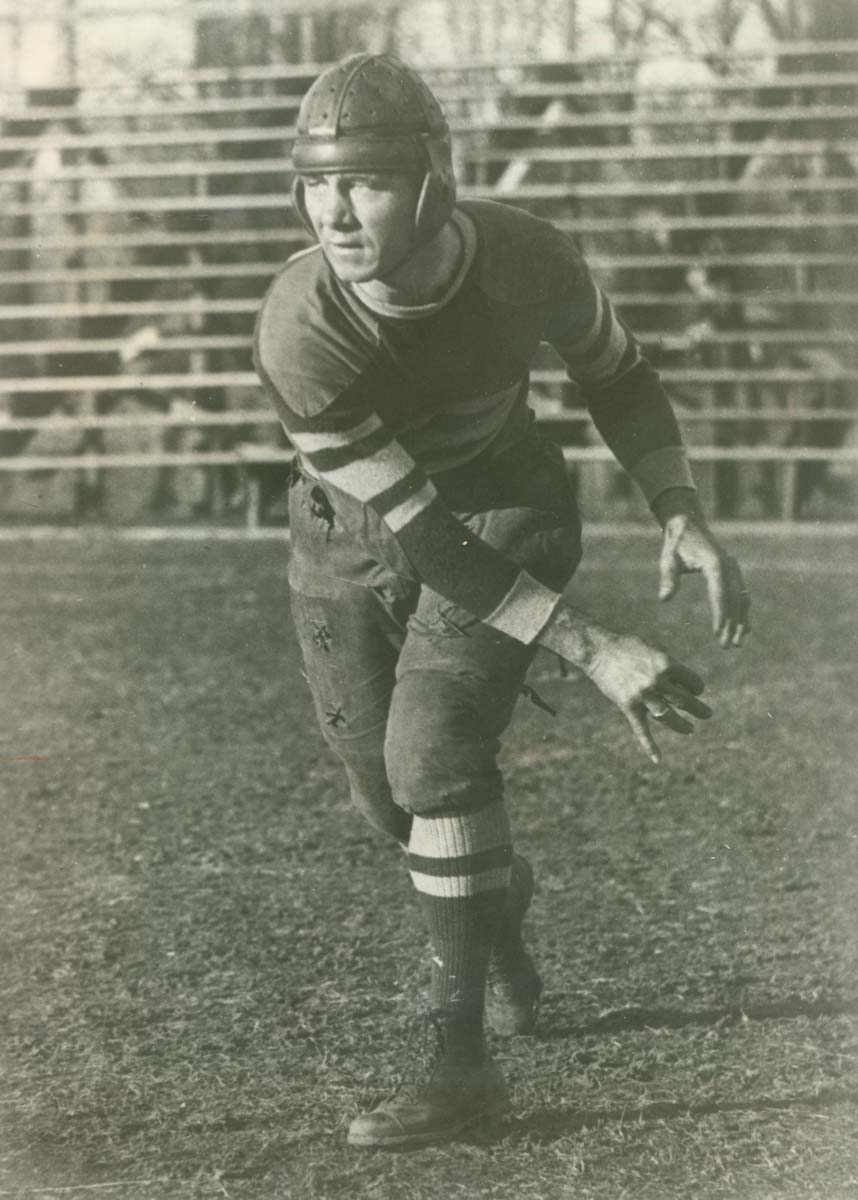
Bo McMillin of Centre College.

The composite eleven posted by H. J. Stegeman, coach at the University of Georgia, for Spalding's Football Guide included:

- Alf Adams, end for Vanderbilt, also a basketball star and later an attorney.
- Pete Bonner, guard for Auburn, selected for various all-time Auburn teams.
- Josh Cody, tackle for Vanderbilt, inducted into the College Football Hall of Fame in 1970, only three-time All-American in Vanderbilt football history. He was selected for the Associated Press Southeast Area All-Time football team 1869-1919 era. Third-team Camp All-American. Later a prominent football coach at many institutions.
- Bum Day, center for Georgia, in 1918 as a player for Georgia Tech was the first Southern player selected first-team All-American by Walter Camp.
- Bill Fincher, end/tackle for Georgia Tech, a unanimous selection and this year the third Southern player selected first-team All-American by Walter Camp, inducted into the College Football Hall of Fame in 1974. He also kicked.
- Buck Flowers, halfback for Georgia Tech, inducted into the College Football Hall of Fame in 1955. He was selected for the Associated Press Southeast Area All-Time football team 1869-1919 era. He also kicked.
- Judy Harlan, fullback for Georgia Tech, came into his own upon returning to Tech for the 1919 season, "the line plunger almost unfailingly good for "must" yardage to keep a drive rolling."
- Mullie Lenoir, halfback for Alabama, later coach of the Bluefield Rams.
- Bo McMillin, quarterback for Centre, the second Southern player selected first-team All-American by Walter Camp, inducted into the College Football Hall of Fame in 1951.
- Artie Pew, tackle for Georgia, member of teams which over two years (1920 and 1921) did not lose to a single southern opponent. He also kicked. Pew was also a basketball player.
- Fatty Warren, guard for Auburn. He also kicked.

== All-Southerns of 1919 ==
=== Ends ===
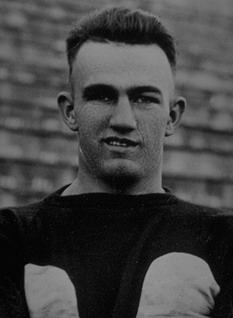
Bill Fincher of Georgia Tech.

- Alf Adams, Vanderbilt (S, NYS, MB, NT-2, JLR, ST, ZN, LR, FA, MJ)
- Bill Fincher, Georgia Tech (College Football Hall of Fame) (S, NT-2 [as t], ST, WGF, BD)
- Al Staton, Georgia Tech (H, MB, ZN, LR, FA, BR, MJ)
- Terry Snoddy, Centre (NYS, CR)
- Tom Zerfoss, Vanderbilt (CR, NT-1, JLR)
- Jack Hovater, Alabama (NT-2, WGF, X)
- Rodney Ollinger, Auburn (NT-1, D)
- Owen Reynolds, Georgia (H)
- John A. Wight, Tulane (X)
- W. R. Bower, Mississippi A & M (D)
- Oliver Daves, Washington and Lee (BR)
- Monk Mattox, Washington and Lee (BD)

=== Tackles ===
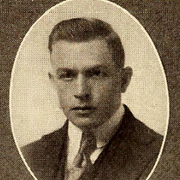
Pete Bonner of Auburn.

- Josh Cody, Vanderbilt (College Football Hall of Fame) (S, NYS, H, CR, MB, NT-1, JLR, ST, D, WGF, ZN, LR, FA, BR, MJ, BD)
- Pete Bonner, Auburn (S, H, MB, NT-1, JLR, ST, D, WGF, ZN, FA, MJ, CR [as g], LR [as g], BR [as g])
- Artie Pew, Georgia (S [as g], X)
- Sully Montgomery, Centre (NYS, CR, BD [as g])
- Turner Bethel, Washington and Lee (LR, BR)
- Babe Carpenter, Mississippi A & M (NT-2, X)
- Bill James, Centre (BD)

=== Guards ===
- Fatty Warren, Auburn (S, MB, FA)
- Dummy Lebey, Georgia Tech (H, D, LR, FA)
- Ike Rogers, Alabama (CR, ST, MJ)
- Tom Lipscomb, Vanderbilt (NT-1, JLR, ZN)
- Yen Lightsey, Clemson (H, D)
- Ham Dowling, Georgia Tech (MB, NT-2, ST)
- Howard Van Antwerp, Centre (NYS)
- Tom Dutton, LSU (JLR, X [as c])
- R. N. Henley, Mississippi A&M (NT-2, X)
- Tram Sessions, Alabama (NT-1)
- Ralph Lee Jones, Alabama (ZN)
- Daddy Potts, Clemson (BR)

=== Centers ===
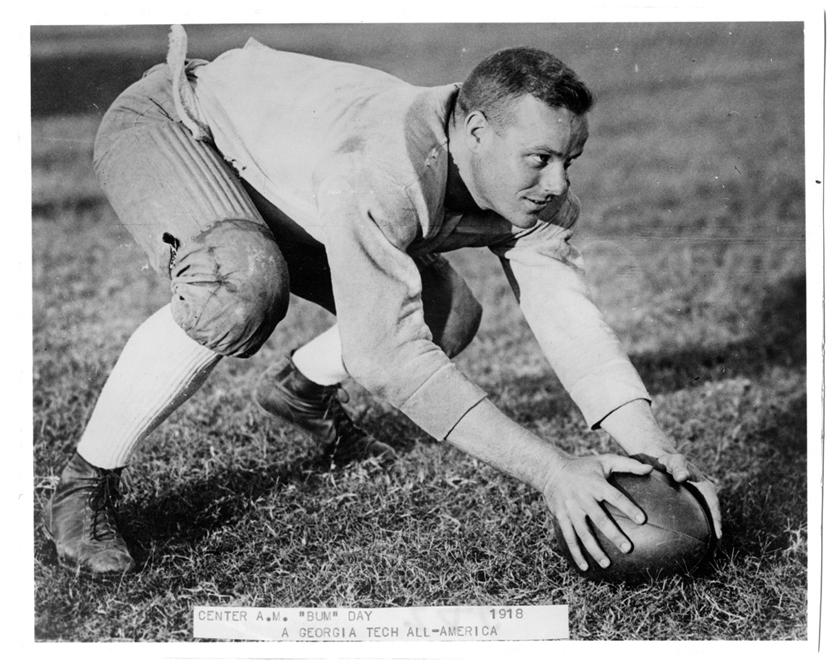
Bum Day of Georgia while at Georgia Tech.

- Bum Day, Georgia (S, MB, NT-1, JLR, FA, BR, MJ, BD [as g])
- Pup Phillips, Georgia Tech (H, ST, WGF, LR, X [as g], MJ [as g])
- Red Weaver*, Centre (NYS, CR, BD)
- Tram Sessions, Alabama (NYS [as g], ZN)
- Noah Caton, Auburn (D)
- Dad Amis, Georgia Tech (NT-2)

=== Quarterbacks ===
- Bo McMillin*, Centre (College Football Hall of Fame) (S, NYS, CR, ZN, LR [as hb], MJ)
- Jim Mattox, Washington and Lee (LR, BR)
- Speedy Speer, Furman (MB, FA)
- Charles Scott, Auburn (NT-2, JLR)
- Stumpy Banks, Clemson (H)
- Swayne Latham, Vanderbilt (ST)
- Marshall Guill, Georgia Tech (D)

=== Halfbacks ===
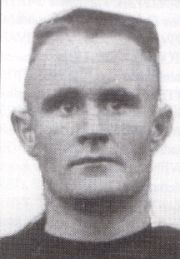
Mullie Lenoir

- Buck Flowers, Georgia Tech (College Football Hall of Fame) (S, CR, H, MB, NT-1 [as qb], JLR, ST, D, ZN, LR, FA, BR, X [as qb], MJ, BD)
- Mullie Lenoir, Alabama (S, NYS, MB, NT-2, FA, X)
- Riggs Stephenson, Alabama (CR, NT-1, JLR, ST [as fb], ZN, X, MJ)
- Norris Armstrong, Centre (NYS)
- Red Barron, Georgia Tech (H)
- Grailey Berryhill, Vanderbilt (NT-1)
- Willis McCabe, Tennessee (ST)
- Red Howard, Auburn (D)
- Sam Raines, Washington & Lee (BR)
- Bill Coughlan, Sewanee (NT-2)

=== Fullbacks ===
- Judy Harlan, Georgia Tech (S, H, MB, JLR, D, LR, FA, BR, X, MJ, BD [as hb])
- Red Roberts, Centre (NYS, CR, ZN, BD)
- Russell, Mississippi A&M (NT-2)

== Key ==
Bold = Composite selection

* = Consensus All-American

S = composite eleven posted by H. J. Stegeman, coach at University of Georgia, for Spalding's Football Guide.

NYS = All-SIAA consensus of various Southern newspapers, published in the New York Sun.

CR = selected by Charles A. Reinhart, sporting editor for the Louisville Courier-Journal.

H = selected by John Heisman, coach at the Georgia Institute of Technology.

MB = selected by Morgan Blake, sporting editor Atlanta Journal.

NT = selected by the writers of the Nashville Tennessean.

JLR = selected by J. L. Ray, sporting editor for the Tennessean.

ST = selected by Stuart Towe, of the Knoxville Journal and Tribune.

D = selected by Mike Donahue, coach at Auburn University.

WGF = selected by W. G. Foster, sporting editor for the Chattanooga Times.

ZN = selected by Zipp Newman of the Birmingham News.

LR = selected by Les Raislinas of the Atlanta Constitution.

FA = selected by Frank Anderson, coach at Oglethorpe University.

BR = selected by Bill Raftery, coach at Washington and Lee University.

X = selected by Xen C. Scott, coach at University of Alabama.

MJ = selected by the Montgomery Journal.

BD = selected by Bruce Dudley, sporting editor of the Louisville Herald.

== See also ==
- 1919 College Football All-America Team
