= Emmett Sizemore =

American football player

Profile
- Position: Guard

Career information
- College: Auburn (1919–1920)

Awards and highlights
- All-Southern (1920)

Emmett Sizemore was a college football player. He was a guard for coach Mike Donahue's Auburn Tigers football team, playing opposite Fatty Warren. He was later a district extension supervisor.
