= Artie Pew =

American football and basketball player (1898–1959)

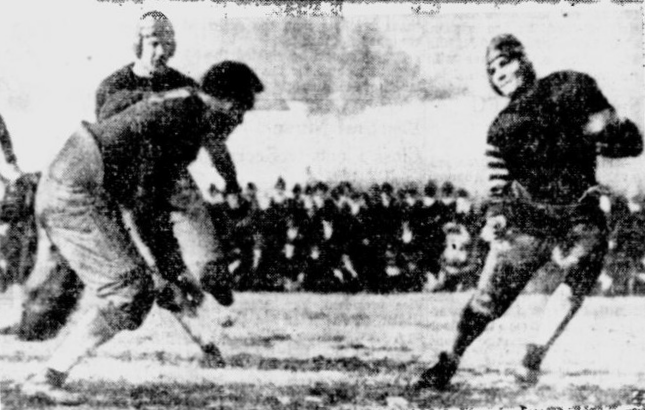
- Artie Pew is attempting to tackle Riggs Stephenson. Behind Pew is Puss Whelchel.

No. 9
- Position: Tackle

Personal information
- Born: March 26, 1898; Damascus, Georgia, U.S.
- Died: December 1, 1959 (aged 61); Paris, France
- Listed weight: 195 lb (88 kg)

Career information
- College: Georgia (1918–1921)

Awards and highlights
- SIAA championship (1920, 1921); All-Southern (1919, 1920, 1921); Georgia Bulldogs Hall of Heroes; SIAA championship (basketball) (1918)

Arthur "Artie" Pew Jr. (March 26, 1898 – December 1, 1959) was a college football and basketball player.

== Early life ==
Pew was born on March 26, 1898, in Damascus, Georgia, to Arthur Pew Sr. and Bessie Harvey.

== University of Georgia ==
=== Football ===
Pew was an All-Southern tackle for the Georgia Bulldogs of the University of Georgia. Pew was a member of teams which over two years did not lose to a single southern opponent. The line was strong, with 4 All-Southerns: Pew along with Bum Day, Puss Whelchel, and Owen Reynolds. Joe Bennett was there as well, and Jim Taylor was on the bench. Pew graduated early, and had expected to leave football a year before his eligibility was up. He changed his mind when a referee banished him unjustly in the Auburn game: "Just for that I'll be back next year," he told his Auburn aggressor, "and we will fight it out on the same field." He was also an outstanding placekicker. Pew was captain of the 1919 team. He made an all-time Georgia Bulldogs football team picked in 1935. He was nominated though not selected for an Associated Press All-Time Southeast 1869-1919 era team.

=== Basketball ===
Pew was also a member of the school's basketball team. During his time there the Bulldogs won a basketball game by the largest margin of victory in school history, 122 to 2 over S.E. Christian. The same team beat Mercer by 65. That year the team's only loss was to North Carolina led by former Georgia coach Howell Peacock.
