= Dummy Lebey =

American football player (1896–1959)

Profile
- Position: Guard

Personal information
- Born: July 16, 1896; Savannah, Georgia, U.S.
- Died: December 27, 1959 (aged 63); Fulton County, Georgia, U.S.

Career information
- College: Georgia Tech (1919–1920)

Awards and highlights
- SIAA championship (1920); All-Southern (1919, 1920); 2nd-team All-American (1920); Tech All-Era Team (John Heisman Era)

Christian David "Dummy" Lebey (July 16, 1896 – December 27, 1959) was a college football player.

== Georgia Tech ==
Lebey was a prominent guard for John Heisman and William Alexander's Georgia Tech Yellow Jackets of the Georgia Institute of Technology. After school, he convinced Buck Flowers to enter the real estate loan business.

=== 1920 ===
In 1920 he was selected second-team All-American by Lawrence Perry, "acknowledged authority on college sports," for the Consolidated Press.

=== 1922 ===
Lebey was alternate captain behind Red Barron.
