= Noah Caton =

American football player and track athlete (1897–1922)

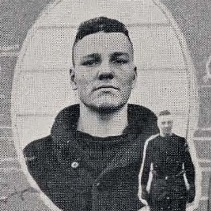
- Caton in the Glomerata c. 1919

Profile
- Position: Center/Guard

Personal information
- Born: February 17, 1897; River Falls, Alabama, U.S.
- Died: April 12, 1922 (aged 25); Birmingham, Alabama, U.S.

Career information
- College: Howard (1915); Auburn (1916; 1919–1921)

Awards and highlights
- SIAA championship (1919); All-Southern (1919, 1920, 1921)

Noah Winston Caton (February 17, 1897 – April 12, 1922) was an American football player and track star for the Auburn Tigers of Auburn University. Caton was thrice selected All-Southern. He was a member of Kappa Sigma fraternity. His older brother Eugene was also a prominent Auburn football player.

== Early life ==
Noah Winston Caton was born on February 17, 1897, in River Falls, Alabama, to Noah Dent Caton and Elizabeth Rousseau. He spent a year at Howard College. He also served in the United States Marines during the First World War.

== Auburn University ==
Caton was a prominent center for Mike Donahue's Auburn Tigers football teams which compiled a record of 20–6 (.769) over three seasons; including the SIAA champion 1919 Auburn Tigers football team and the 1920 Auburn Tigers football team, one of Auburn's greatest teams, which scored 42.5 points per game despite being shut out twice, and set a school record with 332 points in nine games. Caton and "Coach" Warren anchored the line for Auburn in 1920. Caton was captain of the team his senior year. Caton was selected All-Southern three years. He graduated from the school of engineering with an M. E. degree in 1921.

Auburn's yearbook The Glomerata says this of Caton: "a combination of center and tackle that is hard to beat. He has fought against pivot men of all calibres and none of them have been able to put anything over his sector."

== Death ==
Caton died in a Birmingham hospital early in life due to appendicitis. An operation had happened too late and he survived just a week after it. He was in an unconscious condition for 48 hours before relatives gave up hope of recovery. By his side as he died, as well as family, was coach Mike Donahue.
