= Speedy Speer =

American football player and coach (1895–1976)

James H. Speer
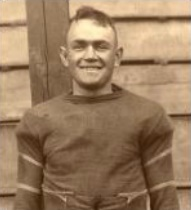
- Speer while playing for Furman

Profile
- Position: Halfback/Quarterback

Personal information
- Born: March 5, 1895; Winston-Salem, North Carolina
- Died: September 2, 1976 (aged 81); Greenville, South Carolina

Career information
- College: Furman (1916–1921)

Awards and highlights
- All-Southern (1919, 1920); South Carolina Athletics Hall of Fame; Furman Athletic Hall of Fame

James Harrel "Speedy" Speer (March 5, 1895 – September 2, 1976) was a college football player for the Furman Paladins of Furman University and a high school football coach. He was elected to the South Carolina Athletics Hall of Fame in 1974, and the Furman Athletics Hall of Fame in 1981.

== Furman ==
Citizens of Greenville raised the money for his college tuition, making him the first player ever recruited to Furman University. Speer also played basketball, baseball, and track. He was captain of the football team for two years, the basketball team two years, and the baseball team one year. Contemporary opinion held Speer as the greatest athlete in school history.

=== Football ===
Speer was a running back, playing quarterback and halfback on Billy Laval's Furman Purple Hurricane.

==== 1919 ====
Speer was selected All-Southern quarterback by Atlanta Journal sporting editor Morgan Blake in 1919.

==== 1920 ====
Before the season, he and coach Laval spent time at the University of Illinois learning strategy. From the halfback position, he helped lead the 1920 team to a 9–1 record, outscoring opponents 286–16 and losing only to SIAA champion Georgia. Teammates included quarterback Milton McManaway and lineman Manning Jeter.

=== Baseball ===
Speer batted .400 in each of his three seasons on the baseball team.

== High school football ==
Speer coached at Greenville High School for 21 years, taking his team all the way to the state final in 1938 and 1944. In 1942 his South Carolina team won the Shrine Bowl of the Carolinas.
