= Tram Sessions =

American football player (1898–1984)

Profile
- Position: Center

Personal information
- Born: November 11, 1898; Birmingham, Alabama, U.S.
- Died: January 24, 1984 (aged 85); Birmingham, Alabama, U.S.

Career information
- College: Alabama (1917; 1919–1920)

Awards and highlights
- All-Southern (1917, 1919, 1920)

Tram Sessions (November 11, 1898 – January 24, 1984) was an American football center for the Alabama Crimson Tide of the University of Alabama. Sessions was selected All-Southern thrice. Sessions was the first secretary-treasurer of the Alabama Sports Hall of Fame.

Sessions represented Jefferson County, Alabama in the Alabama State House of Representatives from the 1940s to the 1960s. He sponsored a house resolution which called for a renewal of the long-suspended Alabama–Auburn rivalry, but it was voted down by the Alabama State Senate by a 21–9 vote. Despite the setback, the football rivalry was renewed within the next five years.
