= Yen Lightsey =

American football player

L. M. Lightsey
Profile
- Position: Tackle/Guard

Personal information
- Listed weight: 185 lb (84 kg)

Career information
- College: Clemson (1917–1920)

Awards and highlights
- All-Southern (1919, 1920); Clemson Athletic Hall of Fame

L. M. "Yen" Lightsey was a college football player.

== Clemson ==
Yen Lightsey was a prominent tackle and guard for the Clemson Tigers of Clemson University, selected All-Southern in 1919 and 1920. He was inducted into the Clemson Athletic Hall of Fame in 1976. Lightsey was named to an All-Clemson team from 1869 to 1935 chosen by the Capitol City Newspaper Sportswriters.
