= Buck Hatcher =

American football player (1896–1987)

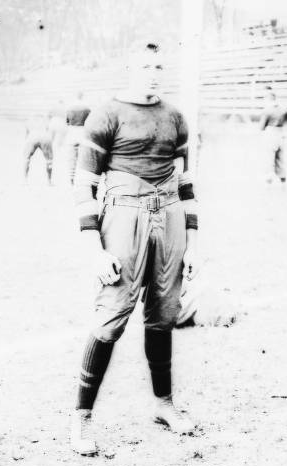
- Hatcher c. 1920

Tennessee Volunteers
- Positions: Tackle, punter, quarterback

Personal information
- Born: May 11, 1896; Fayetteville, Tennessee, U.S.
- Died: November 5, 1987 (aged 91); Fayetteville, Tennessee, U.S.

Career information
- College: Tennessee (1915–1916; 1919–1920)

Awards and highlights
- SIAA championship (1916); All-Southern (1920)

Adolphus Henry "Buck" Hatcher (May 11, 1896 – November 7, 1987) was an American college football player.

== University of Tennessee ==
Hatcher was a prominent tackle for the Tennessee Volunteers football teams of the University of Tennessee from 1915 to 1916 and 1919 to 1920 . He once kicked a 52-yard field goal against Sewanee. At Tennessee, he was a member of Sigma Alpha Epsilon.

=== 1916 ===
Tennessee upset Vanderbilt 10 to 6 in 1916. Hatcher played at quarterback; his also punting contributed significantly, outpunting Tom Zerfoss by 15 yards consistently. The New York Herald ranked Hatcher as the season's premier punter. Tennessee finished undefeated and ranked with Georgia Tech as Southern Intercollegiate Athletic Association (SIAA) co-champions.

=== 1919 ===
A steady rain hindered the 1919 Tennessee–Vanderbilt contest which ended as a 3 to 3 tie. Josh Cody scored on a 30-yard drop kick, and Hatcher later made a 25-yard drop kick.

=== 1920 ===
Hatcher was captain and selected All-Southern in 1920. He booted a 50-yard field goal against Sewanee.
