= Albert Staton =

American football and basketball player (1899–1980)

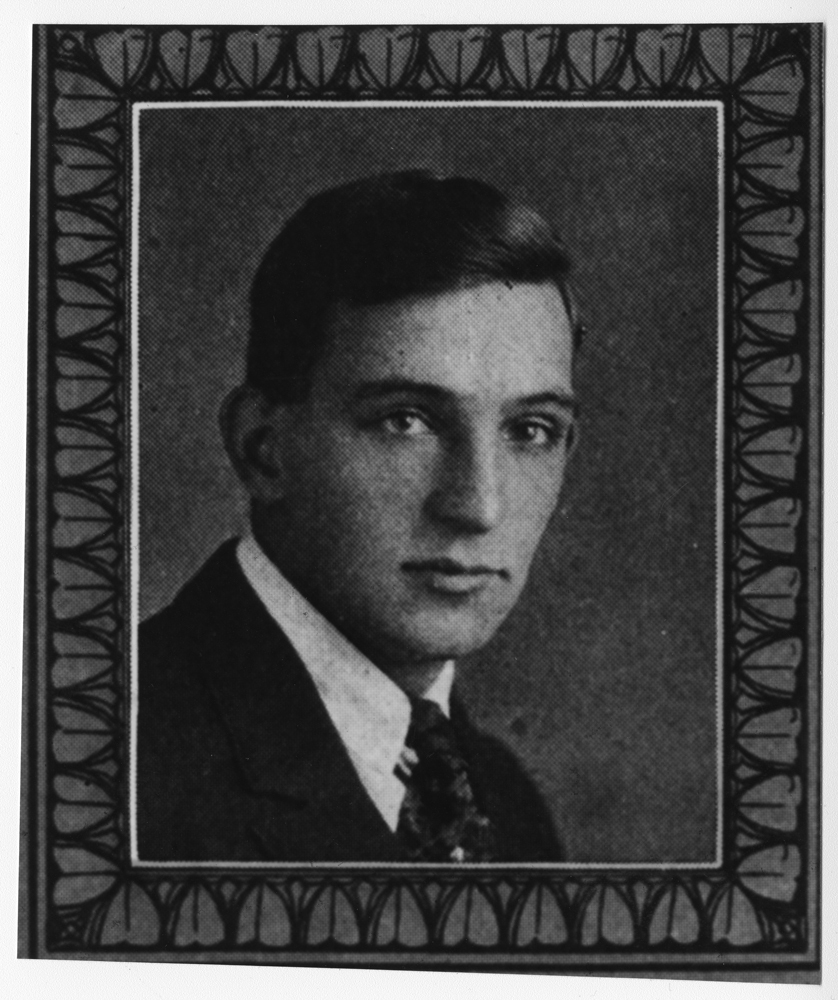
- Staton c. 1920

Profile
- Position: End

Personal information
- Born: December 4, 1899; Attalla, Alabama, U.S.
- Died: January 15, 1980 (aged 80); Medellin, Colombia, U.S.
- Listed weight: 182 lb (83 kg)

Career information
- High school: Boys
- College: Georgia Tech (1918–1922)

Awards and highlights
- SIAA championship (1918, 1920, 1921); SoCon championship (1922); All-Southern (1919, 1920, 1921, 1922); Tech Athletics Hall of Fame; Tech All-Era Team (John Heisman Era)

Albert Hammond Staton (December 4, 1899 – January 15, 1980) was a college football and basketball player for the Georgia Tech Yellow Jackets of the Georgia Institute of Technology, and a Coca-Cola executive in Colombia.

== Early life ==
Albert Staton was born on December 4, 1899, in Attalla, Alabama, the son of John Curtis Staton and Bivien Hammond Staton. He attended Boys High School in Atlanta, Georgia.

== Georgia Tech ==
Staton graduated with a mechanical engineering degree from Georgia Tech. He was a prominent end for the Georgia Tech football team. He was selected All-Southern every year he played, and picked for its All-Era Team. Albert played with his brother John.

In 1921, Staton was captain of the basketball team.

Staton was elected into the Georgia Tech Athletics Hall of Fame in 1963.

Al Staton was the first chief executive officer of the Alumni Association and editor of its magazine. He could also sing, a baritone.

== Coca-Cola ==
He worked for the Coca-Cola company in Colombia, founding the company Panamerican Beverages. He joined the company in 1924.

== World War II ==
During World War II, he served in the Army Air Corps.
