= Manning Jeter =

American football player and official

Furman Paladins
- Position: Guard

Career information
- College: Furman (1920)

Awards and highlights
- All-Southern (1920)

Manning Jeter was a college football player and official. He played for coach Billy Laval at Furman as a guard, selected All-Southern by Herman Stegeman in 1920.
