= John Staton =

American football player (1902–1990)

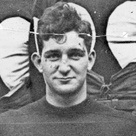
- Staton cropped from 1922 team picture.

Georgia Tech Yellow Jackets
- Position: End
- Class: 1924

Personal information
- Born: June 9, 1902; Atlanta, Georgia, US
- Died: September 16, 1990 (aged 88); Atlanta, Georgia, US

Career information
- High school: Boys
- College: Georgia Tech (1920–1923)

Awards and highlights
- SIAA championship (1920, 1921); SoCon championship (1922); All-Southern (1920, 1922, 1923); Georgia Tech Athletics Hall of Fame

John Curtis Staton (June 9, 1902 – September 16, 1990) was a college football player and Coca-Cola executive.

== Early life ==
John Curtis Staton was born June 9, 1902, in Atlanta, the son of John Curtis Staton and Bivien Hammond Staton. He attended Boys High School.

== Georgia Tech ==
Staton was an All-Southern end for William Alexander's Georgia Tech Yellow Jackets of the Georgia Institute of Technology. He played with his brother Albert Staton, and also played basketball, track, and swimming. John was elected to the Georgia Tech Athletics Hall of Fame in 1965. He was a member of Kappa Sigma fraternity.

== Coca-Cola ==
Staton then joined Coca-Cola in 1924, becoming vice president before retiring in 1968. It was said it was him who designed the company's first cooler and developed its first fountain dispenser. Prior to being vice president he was export manager, and his career included time spent in several other countries including Canada, Australia, New Zealand, Brazil and Mexico.
