= Frank Stubbs (American football) =

American football quarterback

Profile
- Position: Quarterback

Career information
- College: Auburn (1918–1920)

Awards and highlights
- All-Southern (1920)

Frank Stubbs was a college football player. He was a prominent quarterback for coach Mike Donahue's Auburn Tigers from 1918 to 1920. Stubbs was the feature of the loss to Georgia in 1920, including a 59-yard punt return with which Auburn failed to score. He once dated Zelda Sayre.
