= Buck Flowers =

American football player (1899–1983)

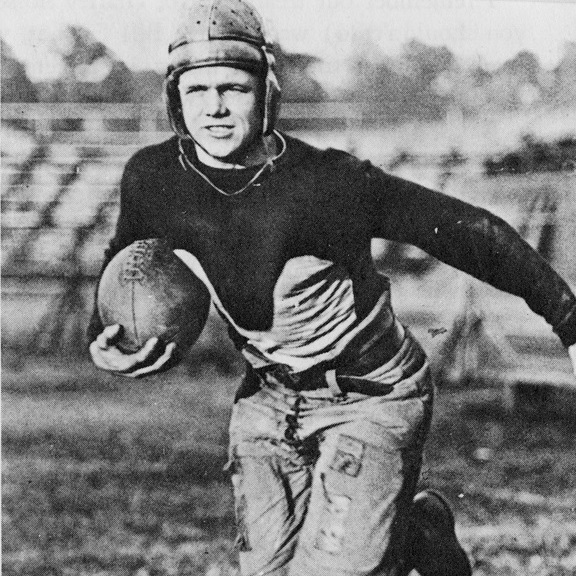
- Flowers in 1920

Georgia Tech Yellow Jackets
- Position: Halfback
- Class: 1920

Personal information
- Born: March 26, 1899; Sumter, South Carolina, U.S.
- Died: April 8, 1983 (aged 84); Birmingham, Alabama, U.S.
- Listed height: 5 ft 7 in (1.70 m)
- Listed weight: 155 lb (70 kg)

Career information
- High school: Sumter
- College: Davidson (1917); Georgia Tech (1918–1920)

Awards and highlights
- 2× SIAA champion (1918, 1920); Second-team All-American (1918); Third-team All-American (1920); 3× All-Southern (1917, 1919, 1920); AP Southeast All-Time team (1869–1919 era); Tech All-Era Team (William Alexander Era)
- College Football Hall of Fame (Class of 1955)

Allen Ralph "Buck" Flowers, Jr. (March 26, 1899 – April 8, 1983) was an American college football player who was a halfback for the Davidson Wildcats football team of Davidson College in 1917 and for the Georgia Tech Golden Tornado football team of the Georgia School of Technology in 1918, 1919 and 1920.

A triple threat, Flowers also handled punting and drop kicks. Coach William Alexander said Flowers was the best punter Tech ever had and the best back he ever coached, calling him "pound for pound, my greatest player". As a safety on defense, no player ever got past Flowers for a touchdown.

In 1955, he became the first Georgia Tech football player to be inducted into the College Football Hall of Fame. Flowers was also selected as a halfback on an Associated Press Southeast Area All-Time football team 1869–1919 era.

== Early life ==
Flowers was born in Sumter, South Carolina, in 1899, the son of Allen Ralph Flowers, Sr. and M. Bettie (Cain) Flowers. He attended Sumter High School. As a senior in 1916, Flowers played for a Sumter team that lost only one game. He later recalled, "I only weighed 115 pounds when I was in high school. I did all of the kicking but didn't run very much because I was so small". He is considered the greatest athlete to come out of Sumter, at least before Freddie Solomon.

== College football ==
=== Davidson College ===
==== 1917 ====
Flowers enrolled at Davidson College in Davidson, North Carolina on a scholarship arranged by his Presbyterian minister. At just 17 years of age he played for the Davidson Wildcats football team. In 1917 Flowers participated in one of the great upsets in Southern football history as the Wildcats bested the Auburn Tigers 21–7. In the victory over Auburn, Flowers returned a punt 65 yards for a touchdown, caught a pass for a second touchdown, set up a third touchdown with an 85-yard return to Auburn's two-yard line, and kicked all three extra points for the Wildcats. He also prevented Auburn from scoring with a tackle at the goal line. Flowers also had a 68-yard run against Navy in 1917.

Davidson scored the most on the 1917 Georgia Tech Golden Tornado, for many years considered the greatest football team the South ever produced, in a 32–10 loss. Flowers made a field goal that game. Some would call Davidson the second best southern team that year. One description of Flowers's play reads: "Against the previously impenetrable Tech defense of 1917 Buck was the Houdini-like escape artist – the will-o'-the-wisp of twisting, tantalizing runs, one of which set the stage for the Davidson touchdown and another of which brought them within range for a Flowers drop-kick of three points. Tech's renowned backfield of Albert Hill, Everett Strupper, Joe Guyon, and freshman Judy Harlan, had all but Harlan make the composite All-Southern team. The spot remaining went to Flowers.

=== Georgia Tech ===
In 1918, Flowers enrolled at Georgia Tech where he played for the 1918, 1919, and 1920 teams coached by John Heisman and Bill Alexander. In his first season of 1918, Flowers had grown to a weight of 150 pounds and was a backup halfback until Heisman discovered Flowers' ability as an open-field runner on punt returns: "Heisman's eyes bulged. And bulged again. On the first punt, Buck ran through the entire first team. Same thing again..and again. Heisman had uncovered one of the greatest broken-field runners." Tech went on to win the Southern Intercollegiate Athletic Association (SIAA) in 1918.

=== 1919 ===
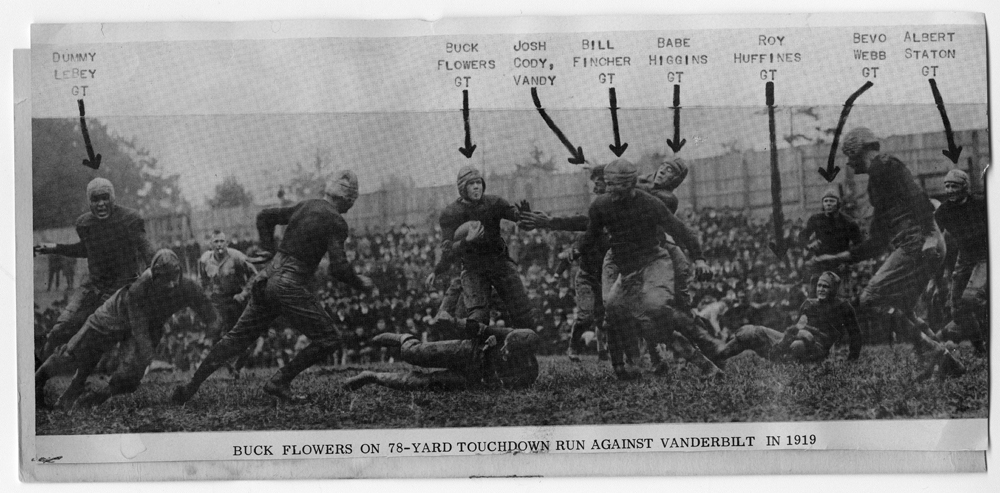
Flowers' touchdown vs. Vanderbilt, 1919.

Heisman resigned after the 1919 season. In a 28–0 victory over Clemson, Flowers had a 26-yard touchdown run around left end. Flowers "sidestepped, ducked, twisted and turned until he had again crossed the field almost to the opposite side and then stiff-arming the last man in his way, crossed the goal for a touchdown." A 15-yard pass from Flowers to Bill Fincher netted the third touchdown. Flowers had a 78-yard touchdown against Vanderbilt in the mud.

==== 1920 ====
Flowers was captain of the 1920 team that compiled an 8–1 record, suffered its only loss to Glenn "Pop" Warner's Pittsburgh, outscored opponents 280 to 16, and tied for first place with Georgia and Tulane in the SIAA. Records conflict as to Flowers' rushing totals during the 1920 season. According to one account, which acknowledged it was based on incomplete records, Flowers rushed 80 times for 819 yards (10.2 yards per carry) and had 290 punt return yards (16.5 yards per return) in six games. According to another account, published by the United Press in 1958, Flowers rushed for 1,425 yards in 1920. Flowers also handled punting for Georgia Tech and led the country with an average of 49.4 yards per punt in 1920. His longest punts were 82 yards against Georgetown and 85 yards against Davidson. Flowers also had an 80-yard touchdown run against Georgetown.

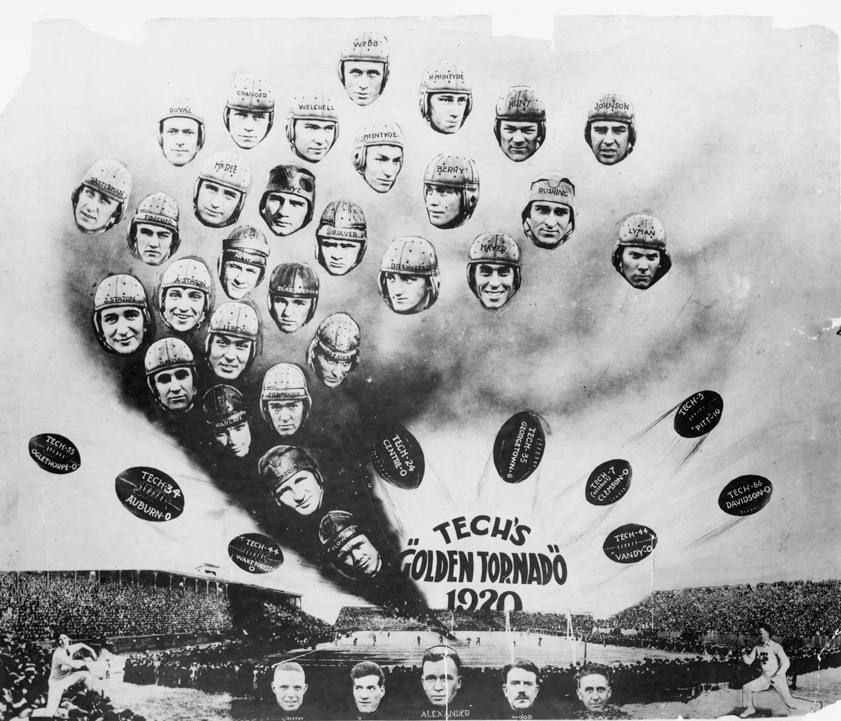
"The Golden Tornado"

Georgia Tech dominated in a week 4 win over Vanderbilt. The 44 to 0 victory was one of the largest at Old Dudley Field. (Note: The worst loss there for Vandy since North Carolina won 48 to 0 in 1900.) It was the first game of the year to have direct implications for the Southern championship, and cited by some as the most interesting southern contest of the week. Georgia Tech outplayed Vanderbilt and had the ball for three-fourths of the game. Many Commodores left with injuries. Vanderbilt's ends were easily skirted by the Tech backs Flowers, Red Barron, and Ferst. Captain Flowers made a drop kick from 44 yards out. Ferst came in for Flowers, when Georgia Tech started to use substitutes in the middle of the second quarter. In the loss to Pitt, Flowers drew praise for his spirited tackling of Pitt's larger backs.

The Auburn Tiger came up with claws sharpened. As he writhed in death agony when the battle was over, he made one request, "Please omit Flowers".

— Sportswriter Morgan Blake,

Flowers appeared in his final college football game on November 25, 1920, as Georgia Tech defeated Auburn at Grant Field in Atlanta by a score of 34 to 0. Flowers scored three touchdowns in the game, including punt returns of 82 and 65 yards and a 33-yard run from scrimmage, and also passed for a fourth touchdown. Flowers also kicked a punt that went 65 yards in the air against Auburn. Sportswriter Morgan Blake had this to say of Flowers' play against Auburn: "The Auburn Tiger came up with claws sharpened. As he writhed in death agony when the battle was over, he made one request, 'Please omit Flowers'".

The Atlanta Journal wrote that Flowers was "flitting like a phantom, an undulating, rippling, chromatic phantom, over the whitewashed lines". After the 1920 season, Flowers was selected as a third-team All-American by the United Press and the International News Service.

== Later life ==
After retiring from football, Flowers had a career in banking and insurance. In 1930, he was living in Atlanta and was the manager of a bank's loan department. In his later years, Flowers lived in Birmingham, Alabama. As of 1958, he was employed as the southeastern region mortgage supervisor for Metropolitan Life Insurance Company.

In 1955, he became the first Georgia Tech football player to be inducted into the College Football Hall of Fame. At the induction ceremony at Rutgers University, Flowers was joined by approximately a dozen teammates from the 1920 Georgia Tech team. Flowers gave credit to his teammates and called his induction into the Hall of Fame his "greatest honor".

Flowers died in 1983 at Birmingham, Alabama, at age 84. He was survived by a daughter.
