= Fatty Warren =

American football player (1898–1946)

Profile
- Position: Guard

Personal information
- Born: September 21, 1898; Coal City, St. Clair County, Alabama
- Died: 1946 (aged 47–48)
- Listed weight: 230 lb (104 kg)

Career information
- College: Auburn (1918–1920)

Awards and highlights
- SIAA championship (1919); All-Southern (1919, 1920)

Chester Clyde "Fatty" Warren (September 21, 1898 – 1946) was a college football player.

== Early life ==
Warren was born September 21, 1898, in Coal City, Alabama, near Pell City in St. Clair County, Alabama, the son of George Washington Warren and Mary Frances Savage.

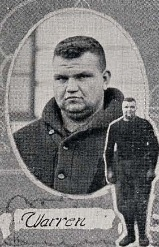
Warren c. 1919

== Auburn University ==
He was a prominent guard for Mike Donahue's Auburn Tigers of Auburn University from 1918 to 1920.

=== 1919 ===
Warren was a prominent member of the Southern Intercollegiate Athletic Association (SIAA) champion 1919 team. Warren "waddled" for a 40-yard touchdown off a blocked punt in the victory over Georgia Tech, the game which netted the championship and gave Tech its first loss to an SIAA school in five years, since Auburn won in 1914. It was John Heisman's last game at Georgia Tech. Zelda Sayre sent All-Southern tackle Pete Bonner a telegram after the defeat of Georgia Tech for the SIAA championship, it read:

"Shooting a seven, aren’t we awfully proud of the boys, give them my love—knew we could."

She signed it "Zelder Sayre."

=== 1920 ===
Noah Caton and Warren anchored the line for Auburn on the 1920 team, one of Auburn's greatest teams, which scored 42.5 points per game despite being shut out twice, and set a school record with 332 points in nine games. Warren also kicked the extra points. He was selected All-Southern.
