= Mullie Lenoir =

American football player and coach (1897–1979)

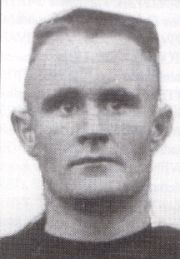
- Lenoir at Alabama

Biographical details
- Born: January 19, 1897; Marlin, Texas, U.S.
- Died: May 11, 1979 (aged 82); Hamilton County, Tennessee, U.S.

Playing career
- 1917: Alabama
- 1919–1920: Alabama
- Position: Halfback

Coaching career (HC unless noted)
- 1925–1928: Georgetown (freshmen)
- 1929–1940: Bluefield

Head coaching record
- Overall: 79–18–2

Accomplishments and honors

Championships
- 4 Southeastern Junior College (1929–1931, 1933)

Awards
- 2x All-Southern (1919, 1920)

Bertram Earl "Mullie" Lenoir (January 19, 1897 – May 11, 1979) was an American college football player and coach. Lenoir was an All-Southern running back for the Alabama Crimson Tide of the University of Alabama, and coached both the Georgetown Tigers and Bluefield Rams.

== Playing career ==
Lenoir was in the Alabama backfield with Riggs Stephenson, coached by Xen C. Scott. The 1919 team lost only to Vanderbilt and officially shares a title with Auburn. Auburn's only loss was also to Vandy, but the game was closer. Lenoir scored three touchdowns in the Birmingham-Southern game that year, the first ever meeting between the two schools, and four touchdowns against Sewanee. He weighed 144 pounds.

== Coaching career ==
Lenoir was the newly elected from coach of the Georgetown Tigers freshman team in 1925. He coached there three years.

From 1929 to 1940, Lenoir was coach of the Bluefield Rams football team. During his span the Rams had a win–loss–tie record of 79–18–2, including a 9–0 1933 campaign.
