= Blinkey Horn =

US sports-writer (1885–1937)

- Born: Claude Sheetz Horn; August 28, 1885; Tennessee, U.S.
- Died: May 20, 1937 (aged 51); Nashville, Tennessee, U.S.
- Occupation: Sportswriter

Claude Sheetz "Blinkey" Horn (August 28, 1885 – May 20, 1937) was an early 20th-century American sportswriter, known most for his work in the Nashville Tennessean. He was a charter member of the Tennessee Sports Hall of Fame in 1966. He was later inducted into the Tennessee Sports Writers Hall of Fame.

== Nashville Tennessean ==
He started at the Tennessean in 1912, held several positions such as police reporter, and in 1919 succeeded John H. Nye as sports editor.

=== Basketball ===
He developed the concept of a state high school basketball tournament and prompted the newspaper to sponsor the state tournament from 1921 until 1929.

== Baseball ==
He was considered an authority on baseball, who could readily pluck names and stats from memory. Horn referred to the right field of Sulphur Dell as the "right center dump" for the unusual hill and its accompanying smell of the nearby city dump.

== Football ==
While passersby stopped to watch, Michigan coach Fielding Yost once diagrammed a play for Horn on the sidewalk using groceries.

== Death ==
On May 20, 1937, Horn died unexpectedly of a heart attack.
