= Owen Reynolds =

American football player (1900–1984)

No. 17
- Positions: End, tackle

Personal information
- Born: January 12, 1900; Douglasville, Georgia, U.S.
- Died: March 11, 1984 (aged 84)
- Listed height: 6 ft 3 in (1.91 m)
- Listed weight: 212 lb (96 kg)

Career information
- High school: Douglas Academy (Douglasville, Georgia)
- College: Georgia

Career history
- Georgia Bulldogs (1916–17, 1919–21); New York Giants (1925); Brooklyn Lions (1926)

Awards and highlights
- SIAA champion (1920, 1921); 3× All-Southern (1919, 1920, 1921)
- Stats at Pro Football Reference

Owen Gaston Reynolds (January 12, 1900 – March 11, 1984) was an American football player in the National Football League (NFL). Reynolds played college football for the Georgia Bulldogs of the University of Georgia, receiving All-Southern honors in 1919, 1920, and 1921. In the 1920 season, he was only knocked off his feet once. Virginia used three men to knock him down. He was captain of the 1921 team. He was nominated though not selected for an Associated Press All-Time Southeast 1869-1919 era team. In 1925 he played for the New York Giants in their inaugural season, making him the first Bulldog to play in the NFL.
