= Pete Bonner =

American football player (1894–1972)

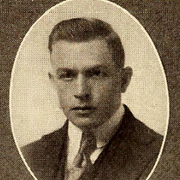
- Bonner pictured in the Glomerata 1917, Auburn yearbook

Profile
- Position: Guard/Tackle

Personal information
- Born: September 24, 1894; Clay County, Alabama
- Died: December 1, 1972 (aged 78); Ashland, Alabama
- Listed height: 6 ft 2 in (1.88 m)
- Listed weight: 183 lb (83 kg)

Career information
- College: Auburn (1916–1919)

Awards and highlights
- SIAA championship (1919); All-Southern (1917, 1919)

Madison LeRoy "Pete" Bonner (September 24, 1894 – December 1, 1972) was a college football player.

== Auburn University ==
Bonner was a prominent tackle for Mike Donahue's Auburn Tigers of Auburn University from 1916 to 1919. He was a member of an All-time Auburn Tigers football team selected in 1935, as well as coach Donahue's all-time Auburn team. He was nominated though not selected for an Associated Press All-Time Southeast 1869-1919 era team. Pete's brother T. H. Bonner also played for Auburn.

=== 1917 ===
Bonner was an All-Southern tackle in 1917.

=== 1919 ===
He led the team to the SIAA championship of 1919 with an 8–1 record. His brother Thomas Herbert "Herb" Bonner also attended Auburn and played on the football team.

Zelda Sayre sent him a telegram after the defeat of Georgia Tech for the SIAA championship, it read:

"Shooting a seven, aren’t we awfully proud of the boys, give them my love—knew we could."

She signed it "Zelder Sayre." One account of Bonner's play that day reads, "The Jackets were unable to gain through the Auburn line because of Pete Bonner, giant tackle, who seemed to have a knack of being just where he should have for the best interests of his team."

== Death ==
He died at the age of 78 in 1972.
