= Bum Day =

American football player (1898–1988)

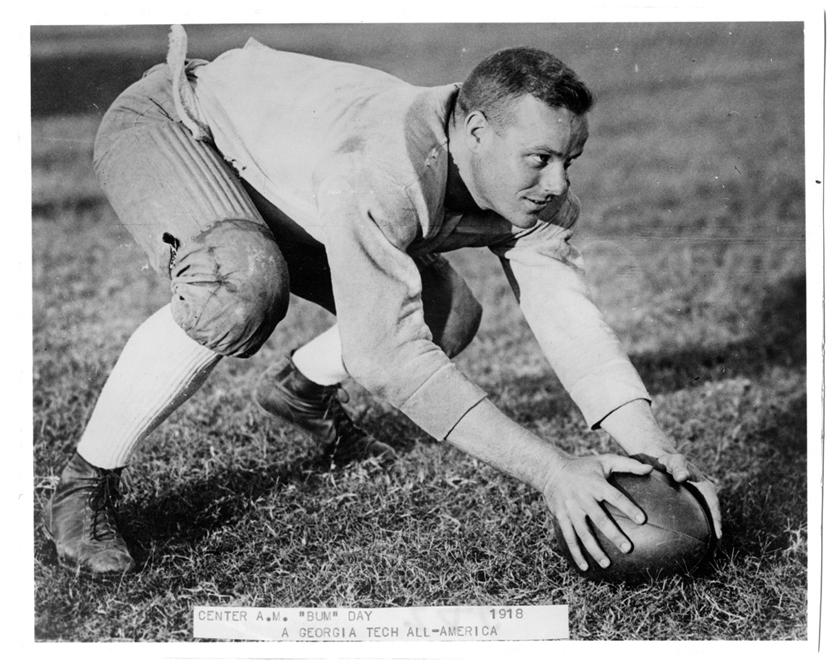
- Day with Tech in 1918

No. 1 – Georgia Bulldogs
- Position: Center

Personal information
- Born: August 3, 1898; Nashville, Georgia, U.S.
- Died: January 30, 1988 (aged 89); Ogden, Utah, U.S.
- Listed height: 5 ft 10 in (1.78 m)
- Listed weight: 190 lb (86 kg)

Career information
- High school: Porter Military Academy
- College: Gordon (1916–1917); Georgia Tech (1918); Georgia (1919–1921)

Awards and highlights
- SIAA championship (1918, 1920, 1921); Consensus All-American (1918); 1st Walter Camp All-American from the South; All-Southern (1919, 1920, 1921); Georgia Tech Sports Hall of Fame (1984)

Ashel Monroe "Bum" Day (August 3, 1898 – January 30, 1988), was an American college football player who was a center for both the Georgia Tech Yellow Jackets of the Georgia Institute of Technology and the Georgia Bulldogs of the University of Georgia. He was the first Southern player ever selected first-team All-America by Walter Camp, who had historically selected college players from Harvard, Yale, Princeton and other Northeastern colleges.

== Gordon ==
He was captain of the 1917 Gordon College football team.

== Georgia Tech ==
As the University of Georgia did not have a football team, Day enrolled at Georgia Tech in Atlanta, where he played center for coach John Heisman's Georgia Tech Golden Tornado in 1918. He was a key two-way lineman during the team's 1918 season when the Yellow Jackets finished first in the Southern Intercollegiate Athletic Association (SIAA) with a win–loss record of 6–1. Day was recognized as a consensus first-team All-American following the 1918 season, when he was a first-team selection by Walter Camp. Day's selection by Walter Camp as a first-team All-American was a historic first; he was the first Southerner to be chosen for Camp's annual All-America first team, which had been historically loaded with college players from Harvard, Yale, Princeton and other Northeastern colleges. Day was inducted into the Georgia Tech Sports Hall of Fame in 1984.

== University of Georgia ==
Day did not complete his college football career at Georgia Tech, however. He later enrolled at the University of Georgia in Athens, where he played for coach Herman Stegeman's Georgia Bulldogs football team in 1920 and 1921. He played in every minute of 1921. At Georgia his jersey number was 1. Day was recognized as a first-team All-Southern selection by the Atlanta Constitution and several other major newspapers following his 1920 and 1921 seasons playing for the Georgia Bulldogs. He made an all-time Georgia Bulldogs football team picked in 1935. He was nominated, though not selected, for an Associated Press All-Time Southeast 1869–1919 era team.

Buck Cheves said "I never saw a better center than Bum Day...He would snap the ball and then make the tackle on kicks".

== See also ==
- Georgia Bulldogs
- Georgia Tech Yellow Jackets
- List of Georgia Institute of Technology alumni
- List of University of Georgia people
