= Riggs Stephenson =

American baseball player (1898–1985)

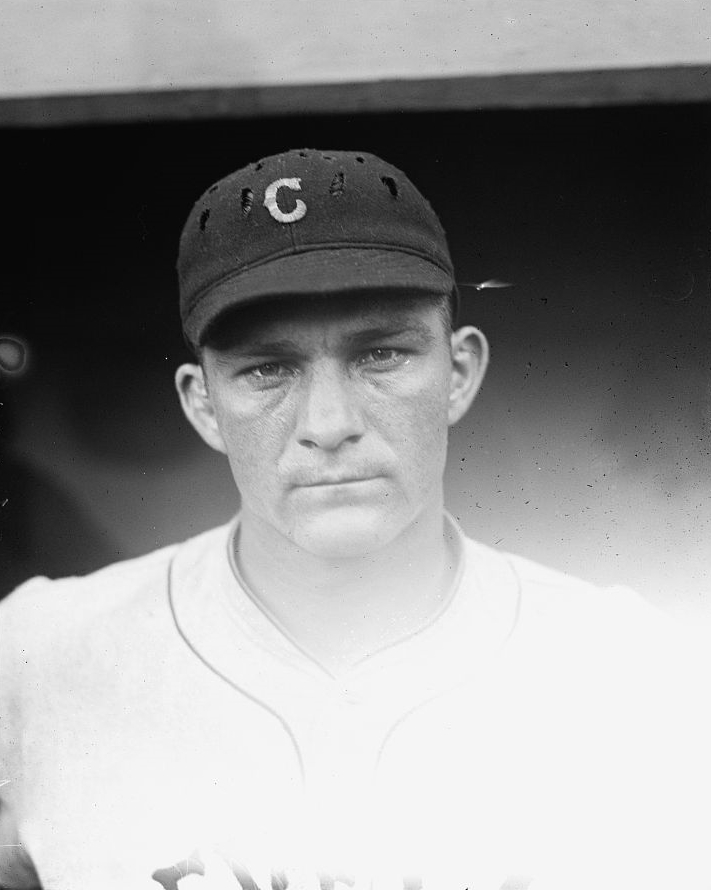
- Stephenson in 1924
- Left fielder
- Born: January 5, 1898; Akron, Alabama, U.S.
- Died: November 15, 1985 (aged 87); Tuscaloosa, Alabama, U.S.
- Batted: Right Threw: Right

MLB debut
- April 13, 1921, for the Cleveland Indians

Last MLB appearance
- September 24, 1934, for the Chicago Cubs

MLB statistics
- Batting average: .336
- Home runs: 63
- Runs batted in: 773
- Stats at Baseball Reference

Teams
- Cleveland Indians (1921–1925); Chicago Cubs (1926–1934)

Career highlights and awards
- Chicago Cubs Hall of Fame

Jackson Riggs Stephenson (January 5, 1898 – November 15, 1985) was an American left fielder in Major League Baseball. Nicknamed Old Hoss, Stephenson played for the Cleveland Indians from 1921 to 1925 and the rest of his career from 1926 to 1934 with the Chicago Cubs. Benefiting from the offensive surge of the late 1920s and early 1930s, he retired with a career batting average of .336, although he was only a full-time player from 1927 to 1929 and in 1932, with injuries and platooning limiting his role for the rest of his career.

== Early years ==
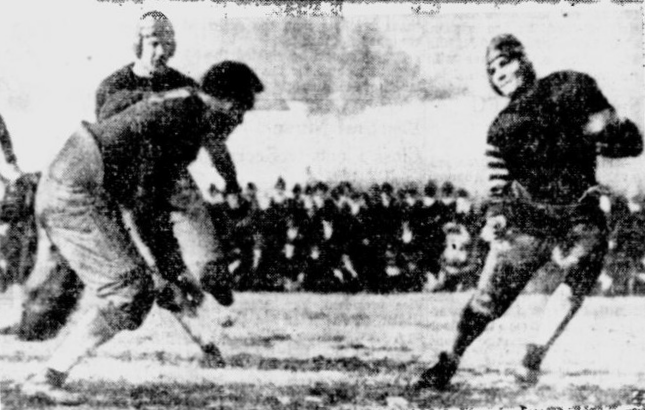
Artie Pew is attempting to tackle Stephenson. Behind Pew is Puss Whelchel.

Born in Akron, Alabama, Stephenson originally played baseball and football at the University of Alabama before he started his professional baseball career. A natural athlete who excelled in both sports, Stephenson had a good reputation at the university. Former University of Alabama president George H. Denny described Riggs as "the embodiment of cleanliness, manliness, and courage." He was an All-Southern fullback in 1919 and 1920. He was nominated though not selected for an Associated Press All-Time Southeast 1869–1919 era team. Stephenson sustained a shoulder injury in a football game in 1920 when he dropped back and was tackled by a pair of linebackers. His injury to his right shoulder was so bad that he had to end his football career as a quarterback, and as a result it greatly affected his throwing abilities. His throwing problems made it difficult for him to turn double plays, but his hitting compensated for those fielding woes. Stephenson quit school at Alabama and immediately made the jump to professional baseball, where he signed with the defending World Series champions Cleveland Indians at the age of 23..

== With the Indians ==
Stephenson made his major league debut on April 13, 1921, and continued to play limitedly during the remainder of the season. His weak arm and throwing difficulties weakened his fielding abilities at second base, as seen by the 17 errors he committed in the 54 games he played at the position that season. However, Riggs' hitting compensated for his fielding woes; he hit 17 doubles among his 68 hits during his 65-game season that year. Stephenson batted .330, reaching a mark that he would frequently surpass during the rest of his professional career.

The following season, Stephenson made the transition towards playing third base in the middle of the season. In 34 games at third base, 25 at second base and three in the outfield, he committed 11 errors, a sharp improvement from the previous season. He continued to shine at the plate, batting .339 in 86 games, with 24 doubles and 47 runs scored. In 1923, Stephenson was moved back to second base and only committed thirteen errors and had a .970 fielding percentage in 66 games. He batted .319 for the season, finishing with 96 hits, 20 doubles and a .357 on-base percentage. On September 14, Frank Brower hit a line drive directly to Boston Red Sox first baseman George Burns, and Rube Lutzke and Stephenson were tagged out to complete Burns' unassisted triple play, only the fourth in major league history.

Stephenson had limited playing time again in 1924, only playing in 71 games. However, he batted a career-best .371 with 89 hits and a .439 on-base percentage. He was sent to the outfield the following year, and played only 19 games before being sent back down the minor leagues by the Indians in order to make him a full-time outfielder. During 1925, Riggs was optioned to the Kansas City AA team, which then traded him to Indianapolis (AA) for Johnny Hodapp. In 1926, Cubs manager Joe McCarthy was able to acquire Stephenson to produce "one of the hardest hitting outfields of all time".

== With the Cubs ==
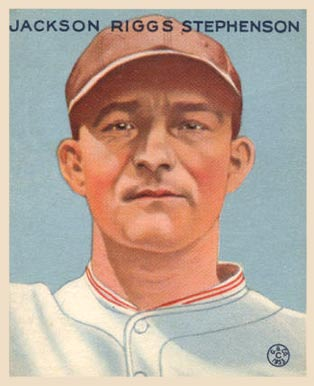
Goudey baseball card, 1933

Stephenson again played limitedly with the Cubs, but spent the whole season at left field. In 1926, he batted .338 with 95 hits in just 82 games. The following season, his seventh in the majors, was the first complete season of his career. Riggs had a remarkable season, playing in 152 games while batting .344 with a .415 on-base percentage. His batting average was fourth-highest in the National League, and he led the league in doubles with 46. He finished fifth in the league in hits and seventh in the league for scoring 101 runs. Riggs also placed 20th in the NL Most Valuable Player Award voting. He also earned the nickname "Old Hoss" because of his reliability as a hitter that season. Stephenson followed up with another solid performance in 1928, batting .324 with 90 runs batted in and 166 hits.

1929 was a career year for Stephenson. He batted .362 on the year and had a .445 on-base percentage, both fifth highest in the league. He finished with seventeen home runs, 110 RBIs and 179 hits. He also placed 23rd in the league's MVP Award voting this time around. Stephenson teamed up with fellow Cubs outfielders and future Hall of Famers Kiki Cuyler and Hack Wilson to be the only outfield trio in NL history to drive in over 100 runs each on the season. Stephenson was most useful in the 1929 World Series. Despite the Cubs' loss in five games to Connie Mack and the Philadelphia Athletics, Stephenson collected six hits, including a double in Game 3 and knocked in one and scored three runs. Stephenson followed up with another solid, but shortened season in 1930. In 109 games, he collected 125 hits and had a career-high .367 batting average. Eighty games into the following season, on July 27, Stephenson broke his ankle in a game against the Philadelphia Phillies at Wrigley Field. Danny Taylor, along with Cuyler and Wilson, saw significant playing time for the Cubs in left field in 1930 and 1931.

Stephenson came back in 1932 and collected the most at bats of his career (583) and hit .324 with a team leading 85 RBIs. He hit a career-best 49 doubles, which gave him the third-highest total in the league. He also finished fifth in the NL MVP Award voting. The 1932 Cubs won the pennant over the Pittsburgh Pirates in four games, but were then swept by the New York Yankees in the World Series that featured the Babe's "called shot home run". Stephenson collected eight hits, drove in four runs and batted a team-high .444 in the series. Stephenson's playing time slowly declined. He played only 97 games the following season, but maintained a solid .329 average with 114 hits.

1934 was Stephenson's final year in the major leagues. He spent most of his time as a pinch hitter, but only batted a career-low .216 in 74 at bats. The Cubs released him on October 30. Stephenson subsequently enjoyed a somewhat illustrious minor league career.

== Later years and legacy ==
Stephenson spent the next five years playing and managing in the minor leagues, but called it quits for good in 1939. After baseball, he went back to Alabama, and he opened up a successful car dealership in Tuscaloosa and a lumber yard in Akron. He was inducted into the Alabama Sports Hall of Fame in 1971. He died at the age of 87 at his Tuscaloosa home after suffering a long illness.

Stephenson has one of the highest lifetime batting averages of eligible 20th-century players not in the Baseball Hall of Fame, although his relatively short career (1310 games, 4508 at bats) was barely long enough to qualify for official recognition among the career leaders; other than Shoeless Joe Jackson, every other 20th-century player with a .325 batting average exceeded 6000 at bats. Stephenson's .336 career batting average, 22nd highest in major league history, is also tied with that of Bill Madlock's for the highest in Cubs team history. Stephenson hit over .300 (12 times total) in all but two of his seasons in the big leagues. Stephenson received a total of only eight votes in his four years on the Hall of Fame ballot in the late 1950s and early 1960s. He was on the Veterans Committee ballot again in recent years, but failed to pick up any votes.

== Career ==
Career Statistics:
Hitting

G	AB	R	H	2B	3B	HR	RBI	SB	CS	BB	SO	AVG	OBP	SLG	OPS	FLD
1310	4508	714	1515	321	54	63	773	53	43	494	247	.336	.407	.473	.880	.969

== See also ==
- List of Major League Baseball annual doubles leaders
