= Center (gridiron football) =

Position in American and Canadian football

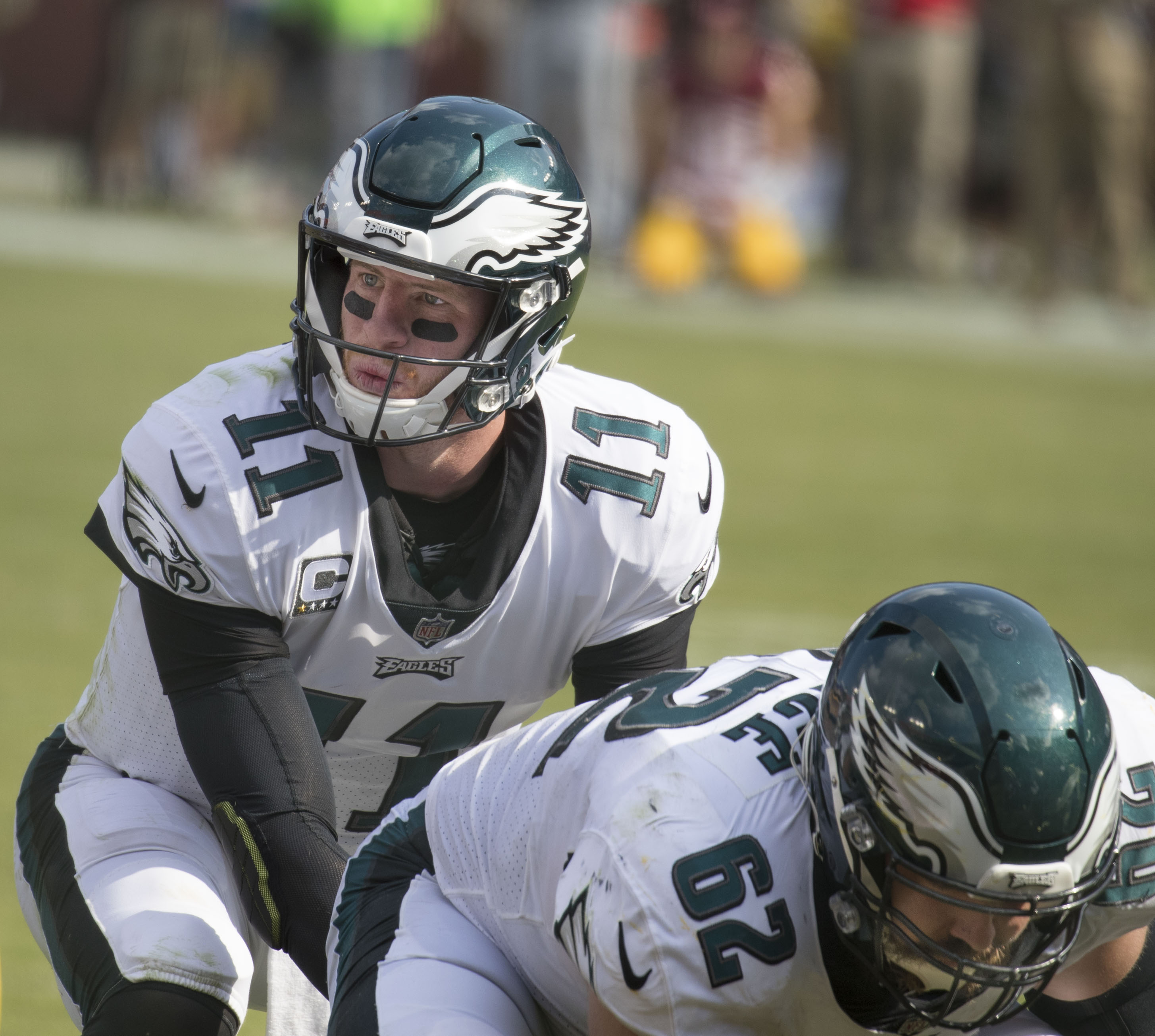
Jason Kelce (No. 62) prepares to snap the football to Philadelphia Eagles quarterback Carson Wentz in a 2017 game

Center or centre (C) is a position in gridiron football. The center is the innermost lineman of the offensive line on a football team's offense who passes (or "snaps") the ball between his legs to the quarterback at the start of each play.

During the period of the one-platoon system, centers frequently played defensively as "middle guards", off the opposing center on the opposite side of the line as with a modern nose tackle. Others played off the defensive line of scrimmage as linebackers.

== Roles ==
The positioning of a center in an offensive formation

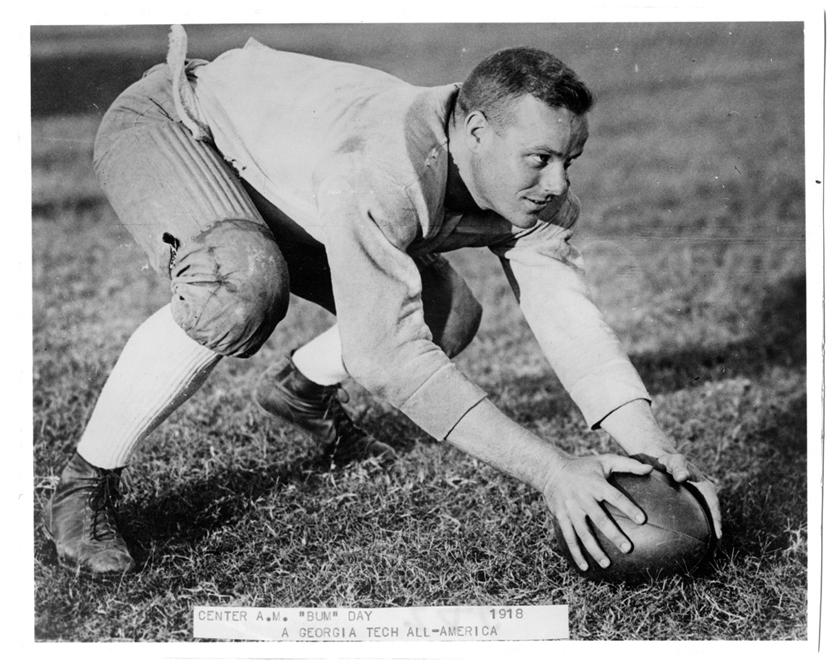
Center Bum Day

The center's first role is to pass the football to the quarterback. This exchange is called a snap. Most offensive schemes make adjustments based on how the defensive line and linebackers align themselves in relation to the offensive line, and what gaps they line up in. Because the center has an ideal view of the defensive formation before the snap, they typically make the first line call. This call is typically based on the position of the defensive linemen or linebackers in their gaps (0i-1i), most subsequent adjustments are dependent on this call. In some cases, the center may call an adjustment for the entire offensive line. This was taken to an extreme by the Indianapolis Colts in the early 21st century, with center Jeff Saturday having equal say with quarterback Peyton Manning in play calling, including audibles.

After the snap, the center performs blocking assignments. The blocking assignments vary by offense but typically consist of the following:

=== Run blocking ===
Run blocking assignments will vary based on the current play and the defensive formation when the ball is snapped. Typically, these assignments consist of the following:

- Blocking middle or backside linebackers in certain formations, then moving up to secondary levels if no linebacker is present.
- Assisting guards in their blocking assignments. This may be a center-guard double-team where the center and guard are assigned to the same target (usually a defensive tackle) to get extra push or drive. Assistance may also be just a quick hit or "chip" to throw the defensive player off balance and help the guard to execute their block, while the center moves up to higher-level targets.
- Backside blocking of defensive tackles for pulling guards. In some offensive schemes, certain plays will involve "pulling" an offensive lineman to block for the ball carrier. If a guard needs to pull for a block, the center will typically block the defensive tackle in order to fill the guard's void.

=== Pass blocking ===
- Pass blocking is similar to run blocking for a center. The center will initially help guards based on the position of the defensive linemen. In the case of a blitz, the center may need to pick up a rushing linebacker, safety or corner. A good center also needs to stay vigilant during pass blocking to protect against defensive stunts and twists.

The importance of centers for a football team has increased, due to the re-emergence of 3–4 defenses. According to Baltimore Ravens general manager Ozzie Newsome, "you need to have somebody who can neutralize that nose tackle. If you don't, everything can get screwed up. Your running game won't be effective and you'll also have somebody in your quarterback's face on every play."

Due to their central location on the offensive line, centers rarely have to block edge rushers, instead usually facing heavier interior defensive lineman. Additionally, centers require increased balance to quickly spring up from the snapping position. Because of these factors, the position lends more to sturdiness than wingspan and agility, causing centers to skew shorter in both height and arm length than other positions on the line.

== During the play ==
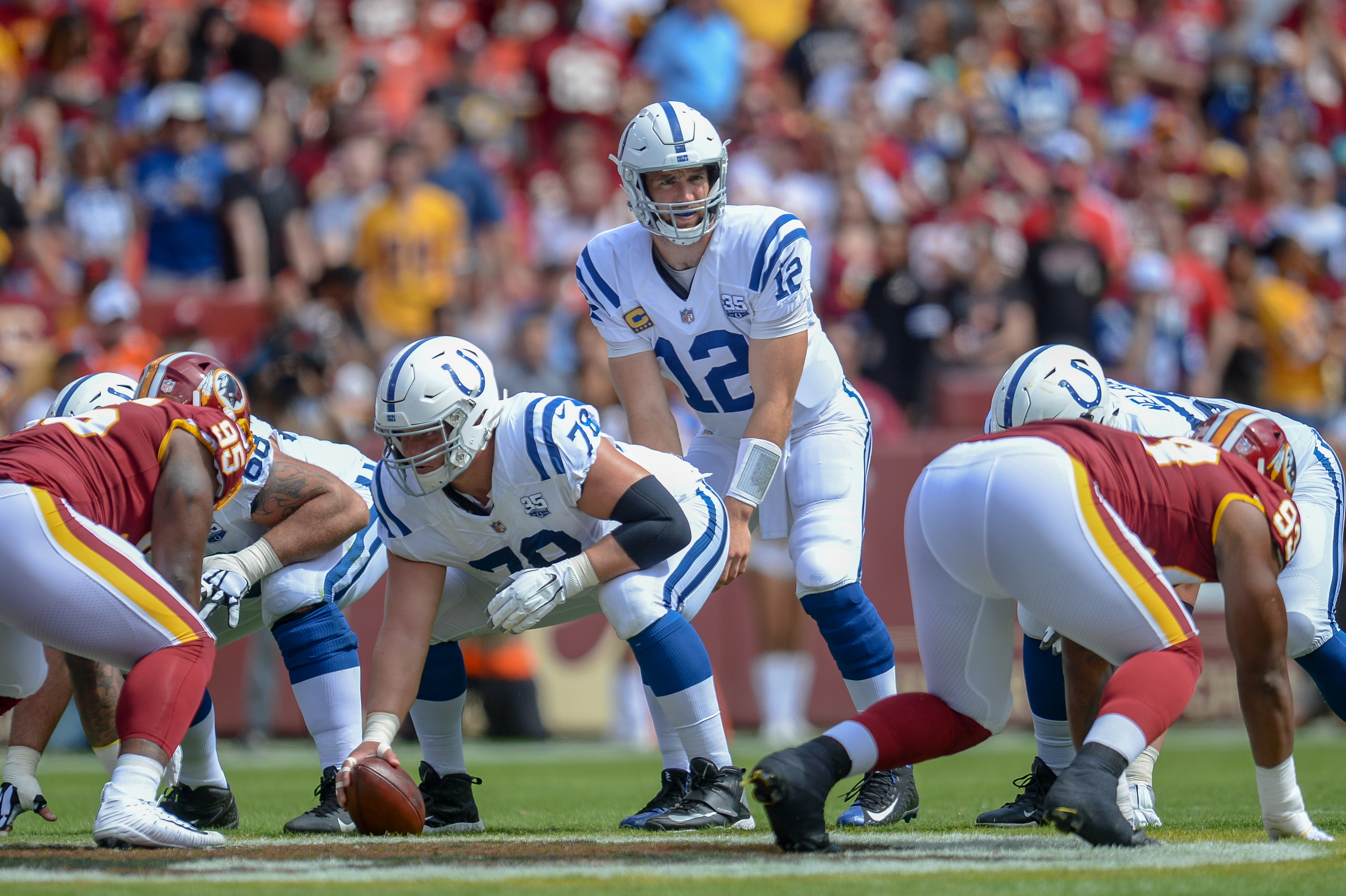
Center Ryan Kelly prepares to snap to Andrew Luck

On most plays, the center will snap the ball directly into the quarterback's hands. The quarterback usually uses a call, usually "Set, Hike!", which starts the play. But the quarterback can use any call for the center. In a shotgun formation, the center snaps the ball to the quarterback lined up several yards behind them. In punt and field goal formations, the center also snaps the ball several yards behind them to the punter or holder on the field goal unit. Because bad snaps can ruin special teams plays and cause turnovers, most teams have a center who is specifically trained for snapping the ball in punt and field goal formations. This player is referred to as the team's long snapper. Also, the center does not have to snap the ball to the quarterback, holder, or punter. They are allowed to snap the ball to anyone behind them. Because of this, some plays involve snaps directly to running backs instead of the player generally expected to receive the snap, hoping to fool the defense. In slang, the player receiving the snap is said to be "under center" if they receive the ball directly from the center (not in shotgun). This phrase is typically applied to quarterbacks but has been used in reference to other positions as well. Once the snap happens, the play is allowed to start.

== Special teams ==
On special teams formations, the snapping is done by a specialized center called a long snapper.

== Drawing penalties ==
Although the quarterback commands the ball, it is the center's snap that renders the ball in play; the defensive line may not cross the line of scrimmage until the center snaps the football. An astute center can help draw an opposing team offside prior to the snap or potentially trick the other team into a penalty by quickly snapping the ball while the opposing team attempts to substitute players.

Under college and high school rules, the center, as a long snapper, may not be contacted until 1 second after the snap has been initiated. This will result in "roughing the center".

Additionally, a snap must be a continuous motion. If a center halts the snap motion, this draws the penalty of "illegal snap".

If an offensive player moves before the center snaps, then that is a "false start" resulting in a 5-yard penalty.
