= Morgan Blake =

American journalist (1889–1953)

- Born: William Morgan Blake; February 1889; Fayetteville, Tennessee, U.S.
- Died: July 26, 1953 (aged 64); Atlanta, Georgia, U.S.
- Education: Vanderbilt University
- Occupation: Sportswriter

William Morgan Blake (February, 1889 – July 26, 1953) was an early 20th-century American sportswriter in the South who in his 24 years on the job covered seven Rose Bowl games. He also taught the south's largest Sunday School class.

== Early years ==
A law graduate and member of Phi Kappa Psi from Vanderbilt University in 1911, he began newspaper work on the Nashville Tennessean. He then switched to the Nashville Banner as a political writer, until eventually becoming a sports editor of the Atlanta Journal in 1916. He was converted by Billy Sunday in 1922.

== Sportswriter ==
Blake ranked Don Hutson led Alabama as the best football team he ever saw. He is one proposed originator of the "Golden Tornado" nickname for Georgia Tech. He is also one for the Georgia Bulldogs. He wrote a story about school nicknames for football teams and proposed:

The Georgia Bulldogs would sound good because there is a certain dignity about a bulldog, as well as ferocity.

Blake was known for his coverage of golfer Bobby Jones. He retired in 1951.

== Agoga's Men's Bible Class ==
Teaching at the Agoga Men's Bible Class at the Baptist Tabernacle of Atlanta, his class frequently reached 2,000 and was rated as the largest in the south. He also wrote religious news columns.

== Bibliography ==
- A Sports Editor Finds Christ. Hale Publishing Company. 1952.
