= 1920 Vanderbilt Commodores football team =

American college football season

1920 Vanderbilt Commodores football
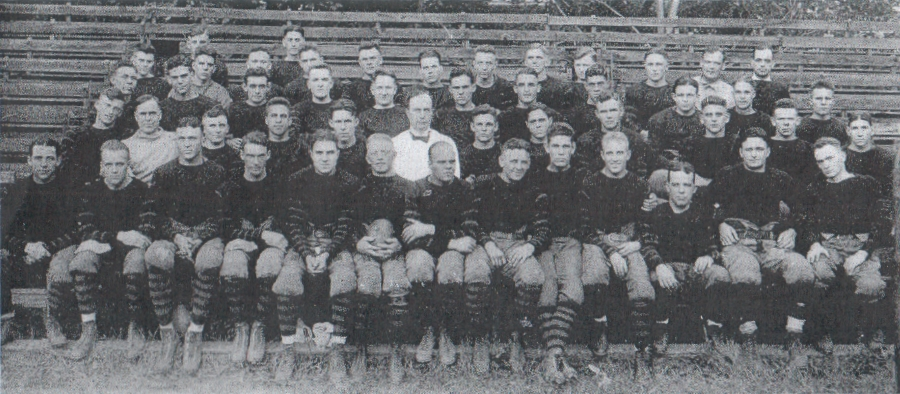
- Conference: Southern Intercollegiate Athletic Association
- Record: 4–3–1 (3–3 SIAA)
- Head coach: Dan McGugin (16th season)
- Offensive scheme: Short punt
- Captain: Red Floyd
- Home stadium: Dudley Field

Uniform
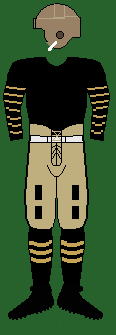

1920 Southern Intercollegiate Athletic Association football standings
	Conf.					Overall
Team	W		L		T	W		L		T
Georgia +	7	–	0	–	0	8	–	0	–	1
Tulane +	5	–	0	–	0	6	–	2	–	1
Georgia Tech +	4	–	0	–	0	8	–	1	–	0
Alabama	6	–	1	–	0	10	–	1	–	0
Centre	4	–	1	–	0	8	–	2	–	0
Furman	3	–	1	–	0	9	–	1	–	0
South Carolina	3	–	1	–	0	5	–	4	–	0
Tennessee	5	–	2	–	0	7	–	2	–	0
Auburn	4	–	2	–	0	7	–	2	–	0
Mississippi A&M	4	–	2	–	0	5	–	3	–	0
Sewanee	3	–	3	–	1	4	–	3	–	1
Vanderbilt	3	–	3	–	0	4	–	3	–	1
Transylvania	2	–	2	–	0	3	–	4	–	0
Howard (AL)	2	–	3	–	0	3	–	5	–	1
Mississippi College	2	–	4	–	0	3	–	5	–	0
Florida	1	–	2	–	0	6	–	3	–	0
Clemson	2	–	6	–	0	4	–	6	–	1
LSU	1	–	3	–	0	5	–	3	–	1
Chattanooga	1	–	3	–	0	3	–	4	–	1
The Citadel	1	–	4	–	0	2	–	6	–	0
Ole Miss	0	–	2	–	0	4	–	3	–	0
Kentucky	0	–	3	–	1	3	–	4	–	1
Georgetown (KY)	0	–	2	–	0	0	–	3	–	0
Millsaps	0	–	3	–	0	0	–	3	–	0
Mercer	0	–	4	–	0	2	–	6	–	0
Wofford	0	–	4	–	0	0	–	8	–	1
+ – Conference co-champions

The 1920 Vanderbilt Commodores football team represented Vanderbilt University during the 1920 college football season. The team's head coach was Dan McGugin, who served his 16th season in that capacity. Members of the Southern Intercollegiate Athletic Association (SIAA), the Commodores played five home games in Nashville, Tennessee, and finished the season with a record 4–3–1 and 3–3 in the SIAA. The Commodores outscored their opponents, 134–124.

Fred Russell's Fifty Years of Vanderbilt Football gives the year of 1920 the title "One of Most Difficult Schedules," including losses to SIAA champion Georgia Tech, Auburn, and Alabama. The games against Tech and Auburn were not close; losses of 44–0 and 56–6 respectively. The season also featured a tie with Virginia, a regional Southern powerhouse, which lost only to national champion Harvard and South Atlantic Intercollegiate Athletic Association (SAIAA) champion VMI.

== Schedule ==
Date	Opponent	Site	Result	Attendance	Source
October 2	Birmingham–Southern*	Dudley Field; Nashville, TN	W 54–0		
October 9	at Tennessee	Waite Field; Knoxville, TN (rivalry)	W 20–0	5,000	
October 16	Georgia Tech	Dudley Field; Nashville, TN (rivalry)	L 0–44		
October 23	at Auburn	Rickwood Field; Birmingham, AL	L 6–56	8,000–11,000	
October 30	Kentucky	Dudley Field; Nashville, TN (rivalry)	W 20–0		
November 6	at Alabama	Rickwood Field; Birmingham, AL	L 7–14		
November 13	Virginia*	Dudley Field; Nashville, TN	T 7–7		
November 25	Sewanee	Dudley Field; Nashville, TN (rivalry)	W 20–3		
*Non-conference game

== Before the season ==
On September 14, 1920, candidates for the Commodores' football team reported to Curry Field. There were expected to be some fifty men in uniform by week's end, though the university did not open until the 27th. The tackling dummy would be sent out by the end of the week. Former All-Southern end and captain of the 1913 Vanderbilt team Enoch Brown assisted Coach McGugin.

Practice indicated Vanderbilt should have a decent backfield in the upcoming season. However, the line was expected to take a significant downturn, given the loss of All-Southern tackles Josh Cody and Tom Lipscomb. Cody coached Mercer in 1920. Ends Alfred T. Adams and Tom Zerfoss also ranked among the best in the South and had played their last football at Vandy. In all, Vanderbilt expected to lose seven players to graduation following the 1919 season, and therefore to have a 1920 squad built of many new faces. However, Vanderbilt still returned seventeen lettermen.

== Game summaries ==
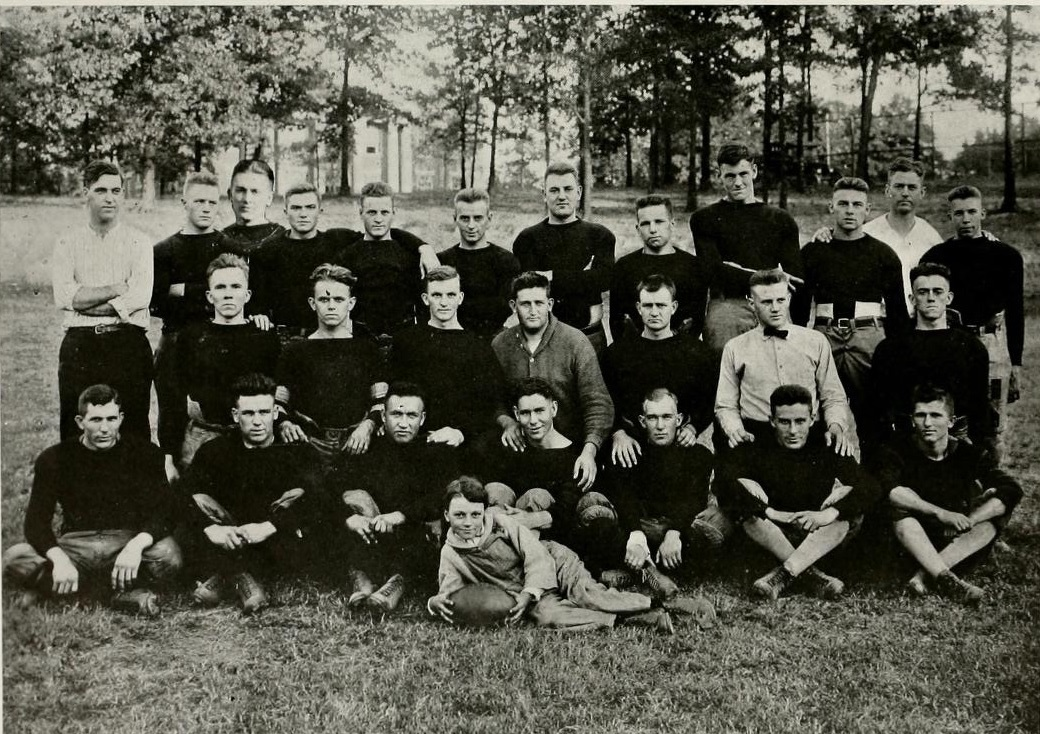
The Panthers football team.

=== Week 1: Birmingham–Southern ===
Week 1: Birmingham–Southern @ Vanderbilt

Team	1	2	3	4	Total
B'ham Southern	0	0	0	0	0
• Vanderbilt	21	26	0	7	54

- Date: October 2
- Location: Curry Field
  Nashville, Tennessee
- Referee: Dick Hager

The season opened at Curry Field on October 2 with a 54–0 victory over the Birmingham–Southern Panthers. The Panthers were coached by former Vanderbilt letterman Charles H. Brown, The Panthers entered the game without veteran lineman Bob Rowe due to a broken collarbone. Center Dave Evans was also likely to sit out.

The Commodores racked up 47 points in the first half on the backs of "Berryhill, Kuhn, Latham & Co." The first touchdown was a 60-yard punt return from Grailey Berryhill. Later, Kuhn added three touchdowns. Birmingham–Southern's lone chance to score was off an interception in the third quarter which got them to Vanderbilt's 10-yard line. The Commodores used substitutes throughout the second half.

Captain and halfback of the Birmingham–Southern team, Eddie Lewis, outpunted the Vanderbilt Commodores with punts averaging easily 50 yards; and punted well against good competition all season. Halfback "Greek" Griffin of the Panthers had played in his first game and had a fine outing.

The starting lineup against Birmingham–Southern: Neil (left end), Buckner (left tackle), Hendrick (left guard), Hill (center), Bailey (right guard), Nellar (right tackle), I. Baker (right end), Latham (quarterback), Berryhill (left halfback), Mixon (right halfback), Wade (fullback).

=== Week 2: at Tennessee ===
Week 2: Vanderbilt @ Tennessee

Team	1	2	3	4	Total
• Vanderbilt	7	0	0	13	20
Tennessee	0	0	0	0	0

- Date: October 9
- Location: Waite Field
  Knoxville, Tennessee
- Game attendance: 5,000
- Referee: Ed Finlay

Going into the game at Knoxville against the Tennessee Volunteers, it was thought the Commodores had quality and depth in its backfield, and thus should focus on the development of their linemen. Commodore scouts said the Volunteers had "the best backfield in point of actual power that has graced the hill at Knoxville in many years." The Commodores were to expect a "hard game against the university rivals." Tennessee had beaten Maryville 47–0 just the week before. The Volunteers were led by John R. Bender in his third year as head coach.

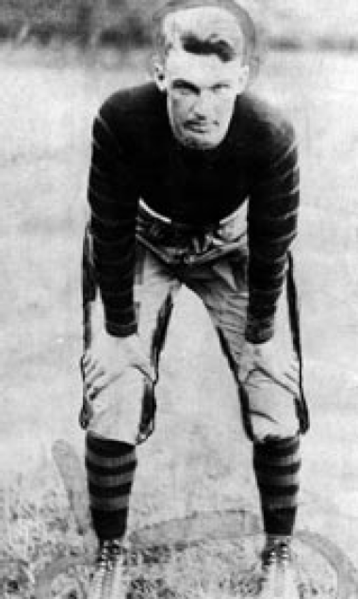
Jess Neely.

The Commodores went on to upset the Volunteers by a score of 20 to 0. All three of Vandy's touchdowns were owed to passes from Jess Neely to Gink Hendrick. A long pass from Neely in the first quarter hit Hendrick, who ran the extra 25 yards needed for the score. Hendrick ran to the 4-yard line on a pass from Neely in the second quarter. The first half came to a close with the ball in Vanderbilt's possession at Tennessee's one-foot line.

Hendrick yet again caught another touchdown, this time a 30-yard pass from Neely, in the fourth quarter. With five minutes left to play Tennessee opened up the passing game and Hendrick intercepted a pass, returning it 45 yards for the touchdown. Scotty Neill also had fine punts, of 45 to 60 yards.

Jimmy Stahlman of the Nashville Banner wrote of the game:

"There is a little white cross in a big military cemetery in France upon whose arms outstretched to the four winds of the earth there hangs a wreath of laurel tonight."

"Above the roar of the football-mad multitude on old Waite Field this afternoon as the last rays of a setting sun filtered through the heavy clouds of dust raised in the final scrimmage, there arose the shadow of Irby Rice Curry, clad not in the khaki in which he met his death, nor shrouded in the Stars and Stripes which covered his beloved remains as the guard of honor fired the last salute and his earthly body was laid away in the precious soil of the country he died to save from the ruthless Hun — clad not in those garments of his final glory, but wearing the old black sweater with its stripes of purest gold, headgear partly stripped from his head, a smile parting his lips as the final whistle blew and a hoarse whisper as he quoted from the Book of Books:"

"Vengeance Is Mine, I Will Repay."

"There on old Waite Field, four years from the time he fought back the attack of Bender's Volunteers, there came the vision of 'Rabbit,' immortal hero of a lost cause. There was the vision caught by every Vanderbilt man who saw McGugin's Commodores of 1920 sweep over the hard-fighting Tennessee eleven in a most decisive victory that wiped all stains away and put upon the shield of black another star of gold that marked in a well-earned victory."

"Above the call of the cheering crowds there came the voice of 'Rabbit' to this men. They heard the call and they followed his unconquerable spirit to a victory that was surprising even to the victors, and crushing in its decisiveness to those who wore the Orange and White of State's great old university."

"A big 20 and a bigger goose-egg tell the tale in brief."

The starting lineup for the Tennessee game was the following: Neill (left end), Hendrick (left tackle), Buckner (left guard), Hill (center), Bailey (right guard), McCullough (right tackle), Baker (right end), Latham (quarterback), Floyd (left halfback), Neely (right halfback), Wade (fullback).

=== Week 3: Georgia Tech ===
Week 3: Georgia Tech @ Vanderbilt

Team	1	2	3	4	Total
• Georgia Tech	14	9	7	14	44
Vanderbilt	0	0	0	0	0

- Date: October 16
- Location: Curry Field
  Nashville, Tennessee
- Referee: Ed Finlay

The third week of play brought one of the worst losses ever suffered at Dudley Field, to William Alexander's Georgia Tech Golden Tornado 44–0. It was the worst since North Carolina won 48 to 0 in 1900. Coach Alexander employed previous coach John Heisman's "jump shift." Georgia Tech entered into the meat of its schedule after three dominating wins. Upcoming engagements with Vanderbilt, Pittsburgh, and Centre were to determine the season's outcome. Pittsburgh and Centre, but Glenn "Pop" Warner's Pittsburgh especially, were the biggest opponents. Vanderbilt was seen as the warm up act to these two, for it was far superior to any of Tech's prior games. The first game of the year to have direct implications for the Southern championship, it was cited by some as the most interesting southern contest of the week. Georgia Tech's Golden Tornado were clear favorites, emboldened by the supposed weakness of Vandy's line. One plus for Vanderbilt was the return of Frank Goar, the team's best punter.

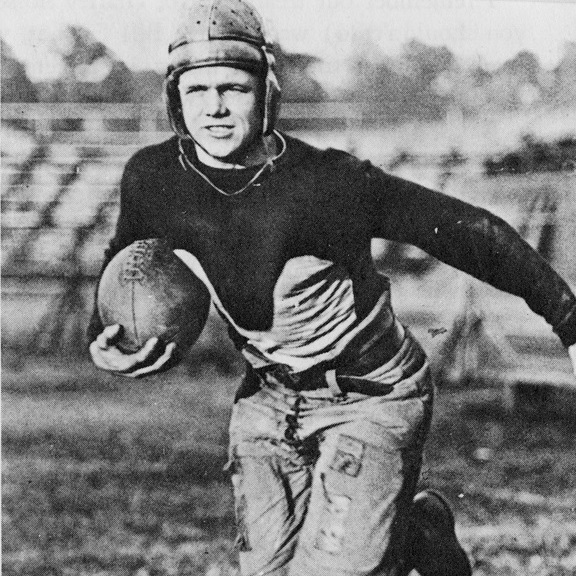
Georgia Tech captain Buck Flowers (pictured).

Georgia Tech outplayed Vanderbilt and had the ball for three-fourths of the game. Many Commodores left with injuries. Vanderbilt's ends were easily skirted by the Tech backs Red Barron, Buck Flowers, and Frank Ferst. In the first period, Captain Flowers made a drop kick from 44 yards out. Ferst came in for Buck Flowers, when Georgia Tech started to use substitutes in the middle of the second quarter.

The third quarter saw Vanderbilt's one exciting drive offensively. "With Godchaux, Kuhn, and Raeburn subbing in the backfield, the Commodores opened a series of forward passes and runs that netted about 50 yards before Flowers intercepted a long pass on his own 10-yard line and raced 50 yards before being pushed out of bounds by a Vandy tackler". Fumbles would cost Vanderbilt, one by Grailey Berryhill leading to Tech's third touchdown. In the fourth quarter a fight broke out, involving Gink Hendrick, some Tech players, and spectators. Hendrick claimed to be protecting Jess Neely from some player for Georgia Tech. No ejections could be made since too many players were involved. Tech lost some 133 yards from penalties during the contest.

The starting lineup for Vanderbilt against Georgia Tech: Neill (left end), Ryan (left tackle), Hendrick (left guard), Hill (center), Bailey (right guard), Holmes (right tackle), Baker (right end), Latham (quarterback), Berryhill (left halfback), Neely (right halfback), Wade (fullback).

=== Week 4: at Auburn ===
Week 4: Vanderbilt @ Auburn

Team	1	2	3	4	Total
Vanderbilt	0	6	0	0	6
• Auburn	7	14	14	21	56

- Date: October 23
- Location: Rickwood Field
  Birmingham, Alabama
- Game attendance: 8,000–11,000
- Referee: Bradley Walker

In the "Frightful Fortnight" of Vanderbilt football, the next week the Commodores were defeated 56-6 by one of Auburn's greatest teams. It was then and for long afterwards the second worst defeat in school history; the worst since the 83–0 loss to Georgia Tech in 1917. Auburn took advantage of a Vanderbilt team not on par with those of previous years and avenge its only loss of last year: 7–6 to Vanderbilt at Curry Field. Auburn made 23 first downs to Vanderbilt's one. The Auburn Plainsmen were coached by Mike Donahue.

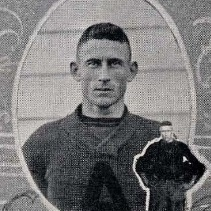
John Shirey (pictured)

The Commodores managed just one first down, and never had the ball beyond their 40-yard line. Jess Neely was one of few stars for Vanderbilt. He blocked well, and tossed Vanderbilt's only score to Gink Hendrick, who stood in the end zone. Frank Godchaux seemed to often get the tackle for Vanderbilt. The Plainsmen meanwhile gained on Vanderbilt constantly. Fullback Edward Sherling gained more on Vanderbilt than any other Auburn back in history, "ripping off five, ten, and fifteen yards at a time." Not even Moon Ducote, "surely Auburn's greatest individual star", ran for as much. Shirling scored four touchdowns. End John Shirey "blocked his tackle, ran into Vandy secondary defense, intercepted forward passes, knocked the man falling back cold in his tracks" and from the backfield reeled off runs of 75 and 65 yards. He scored two touchdowns. Both Shirey and Sherling as halfbacks were selected on the All-Southern team, as well as a 1935 "Auburn All-Time All-Star Team." The back Jackson got another touchdown, and quarterback Frank Stubbs and halfback Red Howard played inspired football. Auburn was captained by its guard Emmett Sizemore.

Starting lineup for Vanderbilt against Auburn: Wilson (left end), Ryan (left tackle), Bailey (left guard), Sharp (center), Hendrix (right guard), McCullough (right tackle), Neill (right end), Latham (quarterback), Neely (left halfback), Floyd (right halfback), Wade (fullback).

=== Week 5: Kentucky ===
Week 5: Kentucky @ Vanderbilt

Team	1	2	3	4	Total
Kentucky	0	0	0	0	0
• Vanderbilt	7	13	0	0	20

- Date: October 30
- Location: Curry Field
  Nashville, Tennessee
- Referee: Bradley Walker

The fifth week of play saw the Commodores beat the Kentucky Wildcats by a score of 20–0. The Wildcats came in as determined in years to score on the Commodores for the first time in their history. The Wildcats made just two first downs all game, one in each half. Vanderbilt rushed for 250 yards in the first quarter, and just less than that in the fourth. Commodore quarterback Swayne Latham played a swell game, but was subbed often in favor of Doc Kuhn so he could rest up for the upcoming game with Alabama. Vanderbilt showed marked improvement in all facets of its blocking.

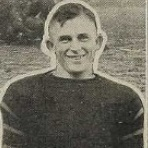
Grailey Berryhill

The first scoring drive for Vandy started when Latham went around left end for 35 yards. Captain and halfback Red Floyd went around right end for 25 more. Latham ran at center, but the played was called back 15 yards for holding, which put the ball at the 28-yard line. Floyd ran around left end until tackled by Wildcat halfback Fuller inside the 5-yard line. Vanderbilt then fumbled the football but recovered it at the 10-yard line. Latham ran through center for 5 yards. Latham tried again but failed to gain. Floyd gained three yards off left tackle. A Wildcat penalty brought the ball to the 1-yard line. Fullback Pink Wade got the touchdown.

An onside kick by Goar was once recovered by Berryhill, gaining 25 yards. Neely gained just a yard through the line. A pass was incomplete, but Kentucky was flagged 10 yards for interference. Berryhill rushed for 1 yard via right end. Latham got through the line for 10 yards and a first down 2 yards short of the goal. Latham, Latham again, and Wade gained minimally, making it 4th down and goal at the 1-yard line. Latham then got in the end zone for the touchdown. He failed to kick goal. Latham kicked to Lavin who returned the ball 10 yards. Fuller gained a yard around end, and two more through the middle. From its own 25-yard line, Kentucky punted to Berryhill, who ran 70 yards for the touchdown down the right side of the field. Latham kicked goal. The Commodores failed to score in the second half.

Starting lineup for Vanderbilt against Kentucky: Goar (left end), Ryan (left tackle), Baker (left guard), Sharp (center), Bailey (right guard), McCullough (right tackle), Conyers (right end), Latham (quarterback), Neely (left halfback), Floyd (right halfback), Wade (fullback).

=== Week 6: at Alabama ===
Week 6: Vanderbilt @ Alabama

Team	1	2	3	4	Total
Vanderbilt	0	7	0	0	7
• Alabama	0	14	0	0	14

- Date: November 6
- Location: Rickwood Field
  Birmingham, Alabama
- Referee: Ed Finlay

In a "thriller from the start," Alabama beat Vanderbilt for the first time on November 6, 1920 by a score of 14-7. Going into the game, Alabama was favored to win. Nearly two full teams, and two full backfields, were prepared by Dan McGugin for the contest, in order to keep his lighter Commodores fresh. A forward pass from Doc Kuhn to Jess Neely got the one Commodore touchdown. "Doc Kuhn subbing for the injured Latham was the brilliant star of the day. Doc was practically unstoppable by the Alabamians and time after time threatened to lead the team to victory," reported the Atlanta Constitution. The week was marked by passing throughout the South.

On November 9, L. Theo Bellmont announced the Vanderbilt Commodores would play the Texas Longhorns next year.

Starting lineup for Vanderbilt against Alabama: Neil (left end), Reybourne (left tackle), Baker (left guard), Sharp (center), Bailey (right guard), McCullough (right tackle), Conyers (right end), Latham (quarterback), Neely (left halfback), Godchaux (right halfback), Wade (fullback).

=== Week 7: Virginia ===
Week 7: Virginia @ Vanderbilt

Team	1	2	3	4	Total
Virginia	0	7	0	0	7
Vanderbilt	7	0	0	0	7

- Date: November 13
- Location: Curry Field
  Nashville, Tennessee
- Referee: Paul Magoffin

"Expecting one of the greatest football games of the year," Vanderbilt had a hard schedule of practices before the coming game with the Virginia Orange and Blue. Vanderbilt had won last year, but Virginia had a better squad this time around. The Orange and Blue entered the game as probable favorites to win, but only slightly. Virginia quarterback Witt sat out the game with an injured knee. The contest ended in a 7–7 tie, which "completely upset predictions." Vanderbilt outplayed Virginia for three quarters.

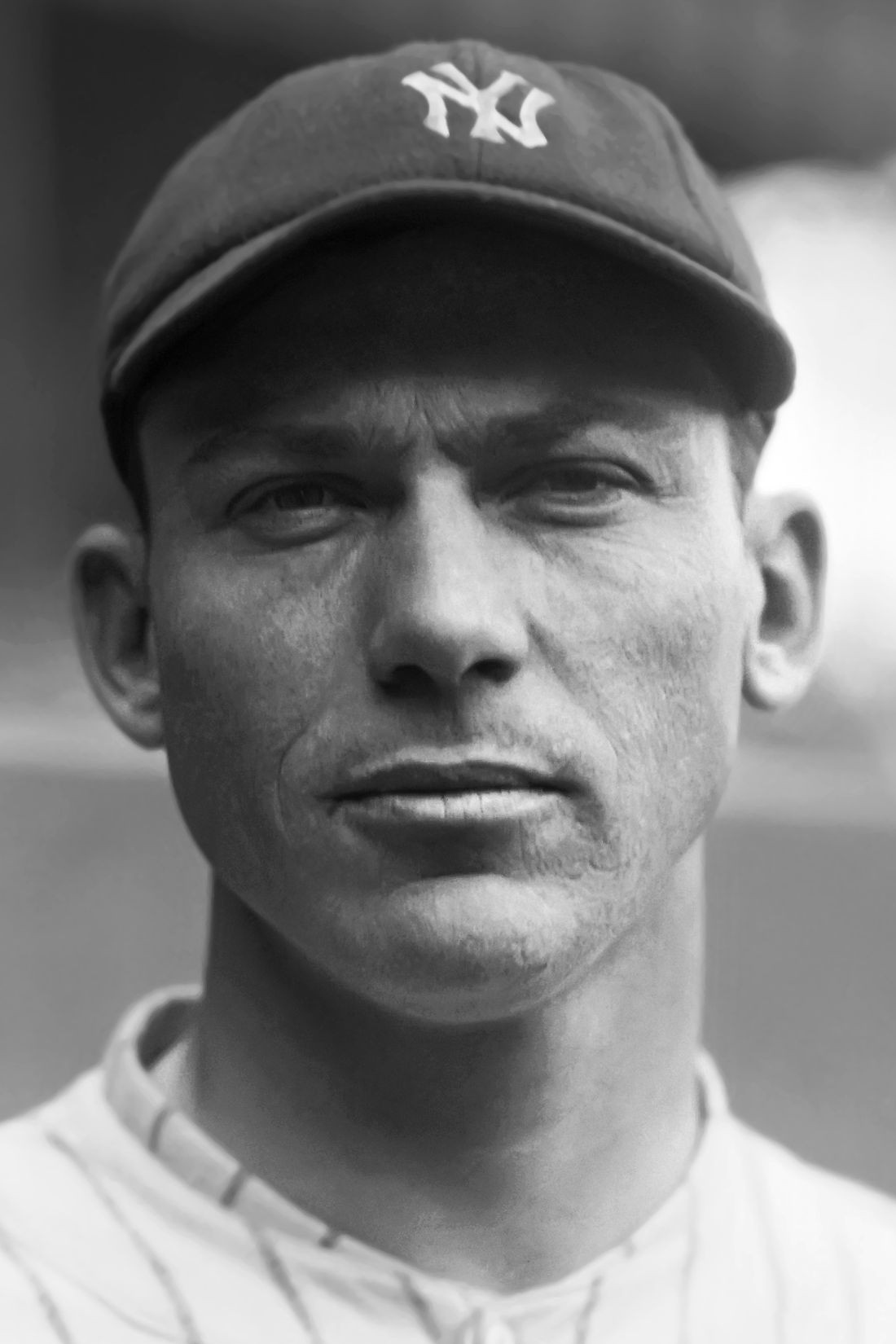
Gink Hendrick with the Yankees

Very near the start of the game Vanderbilt came out with a swift offensive attack. Again a pass from Jess Neely to Gink Hendrick got a touchdown, Hendrick receiving the pass in play and running across the goal line. Virginia's score came in the second quarter, when back Rinehart sprinted for a 40-yard touchdown off tackle.

With two minutes left in the game, Virginia was at Vanderbilt's 5-yard line with a 4th down and 1 to go. Virginia elected to pass. A newspaper account recalls the play, "There leaped a streak of Gold and Black. It was Swayne Latham, crippled and confined to the sideline for the early part of the game, who intercepted the ball and broke around right end. Commodores mowed down a path as he fought his way into the clear. On he raced up the sideline, 50, 60, 70, 80 yards to Virginia's 15, where his injured ankle could no longer outdistance Virginia's defense. A tackler threw him to earth. The official called the play back. Both teams were off-side. The greatest run of the season went for naught. There was time for one more play. Rinehart was stopped short of the goal, at the 4-yard line, by Godchaux, Floyd, Goar, and Baker." Offensive standouts for Vanderbilt were captain Red Floyd and Doc Kuhn.

Starting lineup for Vanderbilt against Virginia: Neill (left end), Ryan (left tackle), Hendrick (left guard), Sharp (center), Baker (right guard), McCullough (right tackle), Conyers (right end), Kuhn (quarterback), Neely (left halfback), Berryhill (right halfback), Wade (fullback).

=== Week 8: Sewanee ===
Week 8: Sewanee @ Vanderbilt

Team	1	2	3	4	Total
Sewanee	3	0	0	0	3
• Vanderbilt	0	0	7	14	21

- Date: November 25
- Location: Curry Field
  Nashville, Tennessee
- Referee: Horatio B. Hackett

In the 30th annual Thanksgiving matchup between Vanderbilt and the Sewanee Tigers, then the oldest annual intercollegiate football contest in the South, Vanderbilt won 21-3. Both teams had practiced hard for the upcoming contest, with practice from the Tigers in the snow and by the Commodores at night. Reports from the Vanderbilt camp alluded to its plans to utilize the forward pass.

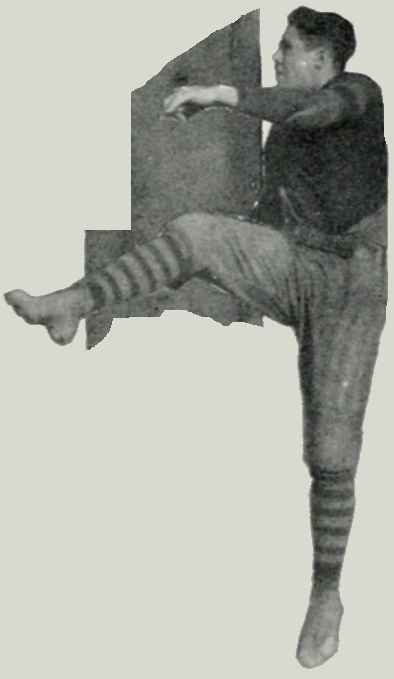
Frank Godchaux.

Sewanee controlled the first half, leading 3-0 at halftime. Appealing to the forward pass and onside kicks, Vanderbilt started a comeback in the second half which ended in a 21-3 victory. It was one of the largest crowds ever at Curry Field. The Tigers were coached by Earl Abell. Sewanee's Skidmore kicked a 30-yard field goal from a quite difficult angle in the first quarter. Vanderbilt was thoroughly surprised, having been outrushed by Sewanee and down at the half, perhaps from overconfidence. Vanderbilt captain Red Floyd gave an inspired speech to his men during halftime.

After the half, Scotty Neill punted the ball to the 4-yard line from the 35-yard line, picked up and run into the end zone by the Commodores' Berryhill to score on a "bewildering" onside kick. Frank Godchaux, subbing for Red Floyd, hit Hendrick on a 30-yard touchdown pass, and later Baker returned an interception 30 yards for the touchdown. It was Red Floyd's best game. Both teams were better on offense than defense.

The starting lineup against Sewanee: Neil (left end), Ryan (left tackle), Hendrick (left guard) Hill (center), Baker (right guard), Bailey (right tackle), Conyers (right end), Kuhn (quarterback), Neely (left halfback), Floyd (right halfback), Wade (fullback).

== After the season ==
Vanderbilt opponents gained less on punt returns than against any other team in the south, due to the covering of Percy Conyers and Jess Neely. Gink Hendrick was All-Southern.

On the night of November 29, Grailey Berryhill was elected captain of the next year's team.

== Personnel ==
=== Coaching staff ===
- Dan McGugin (Michigan '03), head coach
- J. Owsley Manier (Vanderbilt '07), assistant coach
- Enoch Brown (Vanderbilt '13), assistant coach
- E. F. "Mike" Rooney, manager

=== Varsity letterwinners ===
==== Line ====
Number	Player	Position	Games started	Hometown	Prep school	Height	Weight	Age
	Ike Baker	Guard		Navasota, Texas				
	Allen Buckner	Tackle		Owensboro, Kentucky	Kentucky Military Institute			
	Percy Conyers	End		Halls, Tennessee	Union Academy			
	Burnett Doty	Guard		Memphis, Tennessee	Central H.S.			
	James Early	Center		Nashville, Tennessee				
	Wallace Haggard	Tackle		Dayton, Tennessee	McCallie H.S.			
	Hank Heller	Tackle		Cleveland	East H.S.			
	Gink Hendrick	Guard		Mason, Tennessee	Fitzgerald and Clarke School			
	Horace Hill	Center		Nashville, Tennessee	Duncan Preparatory School			
	Ducky Holmes	Guard		Whitehaven, Tennessee	McTyeire School			
	Frank Katzenstine	Guard		Birmingham, Alabama	Birmingham–Southern College			
	Tot McCullough	End		Lewisburg, Tennessee				
	Garland Morrow	End		Nashville, Tennessee	Hume-Fogg H.S.			
	Bill Moss	Center		Jackson, Tennessee	Union University			
	Scotty Neill	End		Birmingham, Alabama	Birmingham–Southern College			
	Eugene Polytinsky	Tackle		Hartselle, Alabama	Columbia Military Academy			
	Charlie Rayburn	Guard		Ada, Oklahoma	University of Oklahoma			
	Tom Ryan	End		Houston	Central H.S.			
	Alfred Sharp	Center		Nashville, Tennessee	Hume-Fogg H.S.			
	Freshman Williams	End		Arlington, Tennessee	Memphis University School			
	Mizell Wilson	End		Nashville, Tennessee	Montgomery Bell Academy			
	B. Palmer Woodson	End		Temple, Texas				

==== Backfield ====
Number	Player	Position	Games started	Hometown	Prep school	Height	Weight	Age
	Alvin Bell	Quarterback		Little Rock, Arkansas	Little Rock H.S.			
	Grailey Berryhill	Halfback		McKenzie, Tennessee	McTyeire School			
	Robert Paul Creson	Halfback		Memphis, Tennessee	Memphis H.S.			
	Red Floyd	Halfback		Murfreesboro, Tennessee	Middle Tennessee State Normal			
	Frank Godchaux	Halfback		New Orleans	Woodberry Forest School (VA)			
	Doc Kuhn	Quarterback	2	Nashville, Tennessee	Montgomery Bell Academy			
	Swayne Latham	Quarterback	6	Memphis, Tennessee	Central H.S.			
	Hugh Mixon	Halfback		Marianna, Arkansas	Polytechnic H.S. (CA)			
	Jess Neely	Halfback		Smyrna, Tennessee	Branham and Hughes Military Academy			
	Julian Thomas	Fullback		Memphis, Tennessee	McFerrin School			
	Pink Wade	Fullback		Nashville, Tennessee	Hume-Fogg H.S.			

=== Scoring leaders ===
Player	Touchdowns	Extra points	Field goals	Points
Gink Hendrick	6	0	0	36
Grailey Berryhill	3	0	0	18
Doc Kuhn	3	0	0	18
Swayne Latham	1	9	0	15
Pink Wade	2	0	0	12
Julian Thomas	1	1	0	7
Ike Baker	1	0	0	6
Alvin Bell	1	0	0	6
Frank Godchaux	1	0	0	6
Jess Neely	1	0	0	6
Scotty Neill	0	3	0	3
Robert Paul Creson	0	1	0	1
Total	20	14	0	134

=== Depth chart ===
The following chart provides a visual depiction of Vanderbilt's lineup during the 1920 season with games started at the position reflected in parentheses. The chart mimics a short punt formation while on offense, with the quarterback under center.

LE
Scotty Neill (6)
Frank Goar (1)
Mizell Wilson (1)
B. Palmer Woodson (0)

LT	LG	C	RG	RT
Tom Ryan (5)	Gink Hendrick (4)	Horace Hill (4)	Fats Bailey (5)	Tot McCullough (5)
Allen Buckner (1)	Ike Baker (2)	Alfred Sharp (4)	Ike Baker (2)	Fats Bailey (1)
Wallace Haggard (1)	Fats Bailey (1)	James Early (0)	Gink Hendrick (1)	Hank Heller (1)
Oklahoma Rayburn (1)	Allen Buckner (1)	Bill Moss (0)	Frank Katzenstine (0)	Ducky Holmes (1)
	Burnett Doty (0)		Ralph McGill (0)	Eugene Polytinsky (0)

RE
Percy Conyers (5)
Ike Baker (2)
Scotty Neill (1)
Garland Morrow (0)
Freshman Williams (0)

QB
Swayne Latham (6)
Doc Kuhn (2)
Pep Bell (0)

LHB	RHB
Jess Neely (5)	Red Floyd (3)
Grailey Berryhill (2)	Jess Neely (2)
Red Floyd (1)	Grailey Berryhill (1)
Red Rountree (0)	Frank Godchaux (1)
Robert Paul Creson (0)	Hugh Mixon (1)

FB
Pink Wade (8)
Julian Thomas (0)

-
