= List of SIAA football champions =

SIAA football champions (defunct)
- Conference Football Champions
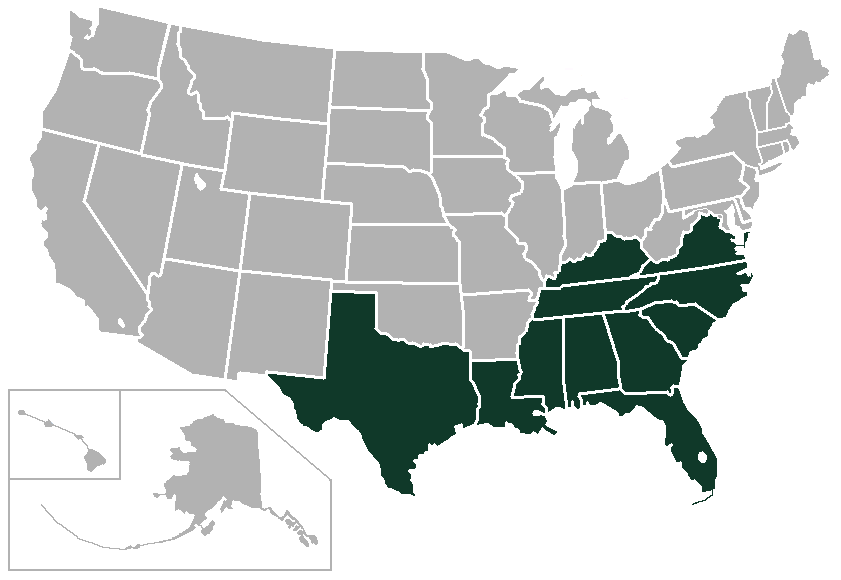
- SIAA map
- Sport: College football
- Conference: Southern Intercollegiate Athletic Association
- Played: 1894–1942

The list of SIAA football champions includes the teams that have won the college football championship of the Southern Intercollegiate Athletic Association since its creation. Twenty-seven of the current Division I FBS (formerly Division I-A) football programs were members of this conference at some point, as were at least 19 other schools. Every member of the current Southeastern Conference except Arkansas and Missouri, as well as six of the fifteen current members of the Atlantic Coast Conference, formerly held membership in the SIAA.

== Champions by year ==
Championships of the SIAA were not officially awarded by the SIAA itself and were instead more mythical in nature, being a combination of which school(s) were recognized as the consensus champion(s) (by newspapers, coaches, and so forth) and what seasons the schools themselves choose to claim. In the 27 years before 1922, when many schools left the SIAA to form the Southern Conference, Vanderbilt claimed 11 SIAA titles. Auburn and Georgia Tech share second place with 7 SIAA titles each.

=== 1896 to 1921 ===
Year	Championship team(s)	Conference record	Notes
1896	Georgia; LSU	3–0; 4–0	Georgia was coached by Glenn "Pop" Warner and led by Richard Von Albade Gammon, who died from injuries sustained against Virginia the following year. Cow Nalley was also on the team, Georgia's only five-year letterman. The 1896 LSU team was the first to use the nickname "Tigers".
1897	Vanderbilt	3–0	Vanderbilt shut out all opponents and won its first SIAA title. Phil Connell, Howard Boogher, and Lucius E. Burch played for Vanderbilt. A game against Virginia was scheduled for the championship of the South, and ended in a scoreless tie.
1898	Sewanee	3–0	Only rival Vanderbilt's Walter H. Simmons scored on Sewanee.
1899	Sewanee	11–0	Led by captain Diddy Seibels and known as the "Iron Men," Sewanee was undefeated and shutout Texas, Texas A&M, Tulane, LSU and Ole Miss over a 6-day span. Only Auburn, coached by John Heisman, scored points on Sewanee.
1900	Clemson	3–0	Clemson's first outright SIAA title. Heisman's first undefeated and untied season as a head coach. The 64–0 win over Davidson on opening day was then the largest score ever made in the South.
1901	Vanderbilt	5–0–1	Vanderbilt defeated the best University of Nashville team in the school's history to close the season and secure the title.
1902	Clemson; LSU	5–0; 5–1	Clemson's only loss was to rival South Carolina, in a controversial game ending in riots and banning the contest until 1909. Despite losing to Vanderbilt, LSU also claims a title.
1903	Clemson; Cumberland	4–0–1; 4–1–1	Clemson was the favorite as champions, but played in a postseason "SIAA championship" and tied Cumberland. Heisman pushed hard for Cumberland to claim a title.
1904	Auburn; Vanderbilt	4–0; 4–0	Mike Donahue's first year coaching at Auburn, and Dan McGugin's first year coaching at Vanderbilt. McGugin remains the only coach in NCAA history to win his first three games by 60 points.
1905	Vanderbilt	6–0	Vanderbilt's only blemish was an 18–0 loss to Michigan.
1906	Clemson; Vanderbilt	4–0–1; 6–0	Clemson had one of the south's best defenses, allowing no touchdowns. Some writers selected Vanderbilt as the entire All-Southern eleven. Vanderbilt beat Carlisle 4–0.
1907	Vanderbilt	4–0	Vanderbilt tied Navy, and defeated a powerful Sewanee on a double pass which Grantland Rice called his "greatest thrill" in his years of watching sport.
1908	Auburn; LSU	5–1; 3–0	Though the school does not recognize it, LSU was retroactively awarded a national championship by the National Championship Foundation. Doc Fenton led the nation in scoring. The season was clouded by accusations of professionalism from rival Tulane. As a result, most sportswriters did not include LSU for consideration as conference champions. Auburn was most popular among those who listed an alternative SIAA champion.
1909	Sewanee	5–0	Sewanee was led by first-year head coach Harris Cope and handed Vanderbilt its first loss to a southern team in 6 years. Rice called Aubrey Lanier "the noblest Tiger of them all."
1910	Auburn; Central; Vanderbilt	4–0; 3–0; 5–0	Auburn's leading scorer was Bill Streit. Vanderbilt tied Yale, the first time Yale had been held scoreless at home, and the South's first great showing against an Eastern power. Central also claimed a title, since Vanderbilt did not play them.
1911	Vanderbilt	5–0	Edwin Pope's Football's Greatest Coaches notes: "A lightning-swift backfield of Lew Hardage, Wilson Collins, Ammie Sikes, and Ray Morrison pushed Vandy through 1911 with only a 9–8 loss to Michigan." The Atlanta Constitution voted it the best backfield in the South.
1912	Vanderbilt	4–0–1	Vanderbilt tied Auburn and suffered its only loss to national champion Harvard.
1913	Auburn	8–0	Led by Kirk Newell, Auburn won a national championship according to the Billingsley Report adjusted for margin of victory.
1914	Auburn; Tennessee	7–0; 5–0–1	Auburn's defense was led by Bull Kearley and did not allow a point. Tennessee beat rival Vanderbilt for the first time and won its first championship of any kind. The 1914 Vols were retroactively awarded a national championship by 1st-N-Goal, though this remains largely unrecognized.
1915	Vanderbilt	4–0	Seven out of eight newspapers voted the SIAA championship to the Commodores. The Atlanta Constitution declared it a tie between Vanderbilt and Heisman-coached Georgia Tech, which was then independent.
1916	Georgia Tech; Tennessee	5–0; 6–0–1	Tech beat Cumberland 222–0. Because of World War I, Tennessee did not field another varsity squad until 1919. The New York Herald ranked Buck Hatcher as the season's premier punter. Graham Vowell was the season's only unanimous All-Southern selection.
1917	Georgia Tech	4–0	Georgia Tech won its first national championship. Tech had a powerful backfield of Joe Guyon, Everett Strupper, Judy Harlan, and Al Hill.
1918	Georgia Tech	3–0	Georgia Tech had a 33-game unbeaten streak until falling to national champion Pittsburgh. Tech scored over 100 points three times.
1919	Auburn	5–1	Auburn gave Georgia Tech its first SIAA loss in 5 years.
1920	Georgia; Georgia Tech; Tulane	8–0; 5–0; 4–0	Georgia, led by its "ten second backfield" (Note: The term "ten second backfield" generally refers to players capable (or thought to be capable) of running a 100-yard dash in 10 seconds—that is, fast runners.) and strong line, was selected for a national championship by Clyde Berryman. Tech's only loss was a controversial one to Pop Warner's Pittsburgh. Florent Gibson of the Pittsburgh Post rated Tech as the best team in the country. Tech also handed Centre its first loss to a southern team since 1916. Tulane's team was led by Clark Shaughnessy and was the first called the "Green Wave".
1921	Centre; Georgia; Georgia Tech; Vanderbilt	5–0; 6–0–1; 5–0; 5–0–1	Red Barron rushed for 1,459 yards, a Georgia Tech record at the time. Tech's only loss was to Penn State at the Polo Grounds. Vanderbilt tied Georgia at the end of the game on an onside kick from scrimmage. Vanderbilt was selected for a national championship by Clyde Berryman.

=== 1922 to 1941 ===
The SIAA continued to exist for another 19 years. In this period the Chattanooga Mocs managed the most titles, coming away with four. At the SIAA annual convention in 1930, nine of the association's members announced the formation of the Dixie Conference to facilitate scheduling of games among the group. The charter members were Birmingham-Southern College, Howard College (now Samford University), Southwestern of Memphis (now Rhodes College), Centre College, University of Chattanooga, Spring Hill College and Mercer University; Loyola University New Orleans joined the Dixie two years later.

At the time of formation, conference president Dean G. W. Meade of Birmingham-Southern stated, "We are still members of the S. I. A. A. and will continue to be so." However, at the SIAA convention the following year, Birmingham-Southern, Howard and Spring Hill resigned from the association. University officials at Chattanooga announced their resignation from the SIAA in 1932, explaining that they "saw no purpose in remaining in the unwieldy association after successful launching of the Dixie Conference two years ago".

Two years prior to the SIAA, the Dixie Conference approved the use of scholarships in 1936.

Year	Championship team(s)	Conference record	Notes
1922	Furman	3–0	Furman was coached by Billy Laval, and beat Florida.
1923	Furman	5–0	Furman won all its games until losing by one point to Clemson.
1924	Centre; Oglethorpe	1–0; 5–0	Adrian Maurer was captain of Oglethorpe. Centre defeated Alabama and 3 other SoCon members for the unofficial championship of the south.
1925	Oglethorpe	8–1	
1926	Centenary	5–0	Centenary was led by first-year coach Homer H. Norton.
1927	Centenary; Chattanooga; Furman; Miss. College	3–0; 5–0; 3–0; 6–0	Centenary posted a 10–0 record. Chattanooga was coached by Frank Thomas and assisted by Scrappy Moore. It was Furman's last season under Laval.
1928	Chattanooga	8–1	
1929	Chattanooga	7–0	
1930	Presbyterian	6–0	
1931	Chattanooga	8–0	Scrappy Moore's first season as head coach at Chattanooga. The team played Alabama in a postseason charity game, and lost 39 to 0.
1932	Western Kentucky	6–0	
1933	Murray State	7–0	
1934	Furman	4–0	
1935	Middle Tennessee State	5–0	Middle Tennessee State was coached by Johnny Floyd.
1936	Middle Tennessee State	5–0	
1937	Murray State	6–0–1	
1938	West Tennessee State	7–0	West Tennessee State (now Memphis) was coached by Allyn McKeen.
1939	Northwestern State	7–0	School says 1939 LIC champions
1940	Rollins	6–0	Rollins was coached by Jack McDowall
1941	Presbyterian	5–0	

== Books ==
- Langum, David J (2010). From Maverick to Mainstream: Cumberland School of Law, 1847-1997. ISBN 9780820336183.
- Pope, Edwin (1955). Football's Greatest Coaches – via archive.org.
- Scott, Richard (2008). SEC Football: 75 Years of Pride and Passion. Minneapolis: Voyageur.
- Traughber, Bill (2011). Vanderbilt Football: Tales of Commodore Gridiron History. The History Press. ISBN 978-1-60949-423-0.
- Umphlett, Wiley Lee (1992). Creating the Big Game: John W. Heisman and the Invention of American Football. Greenwood Publishing Group. ISBN 9780313284045.
- Woodruff, Fuzzy (1928). A History of Southern Football 1890–1928. Vol. 1.
