= Kentucky–Vanderbilt football rivalry =

American college football rivalry

- Kentucky Wildcats Vanderbilt Commodores
- First meeting: October 10, 1896; Vanderbilt, 6–0
- Latest meeting: October 24, 2026; Kentucky, 34–17
- Next meeting: 2028

Statistics
- Total meetings: 99
- All-time series: Kentucky, 49–45–4
- Largest victory: Kentucky, 53–2 (1978)
- Longest win streak: Vanderbilt, 9 (1896–1918)
- Current win streak: Kentucky, 1 (2026–present)

Locations of Kentucky and Vanderbilt

The Kentucky–Vanderbilt football rivalry is an American college football rivalry between the Kentucky Wildcats football team of the University of Kentucky and Vanderbilt Commodores football team of Vanderbilt University. The rivalry between these two schools, located about 181 miles (291 km) apart, dates to their first meeting in 1896. They are founding members of the Southeastern Conference (SEC), and were both members of the SEC's Eastern Division with a total of 99 meetings. This rivalry is Kentucky's second longest behind Tennessee, and Vanderbilt's third behind Ole Miss and Tennessee. Kentucky leads the series 49–45–4.

41 of the 99 games have been decided by 7 points or less. Kentucky has shut out Vanderbilt 6 times, while Vanderbilt has shut out Kentucky 15 times, 10 of which were from 1896 to 1920. The rivalry is one of the most evenly matched in the SEC.

== Notable games ==
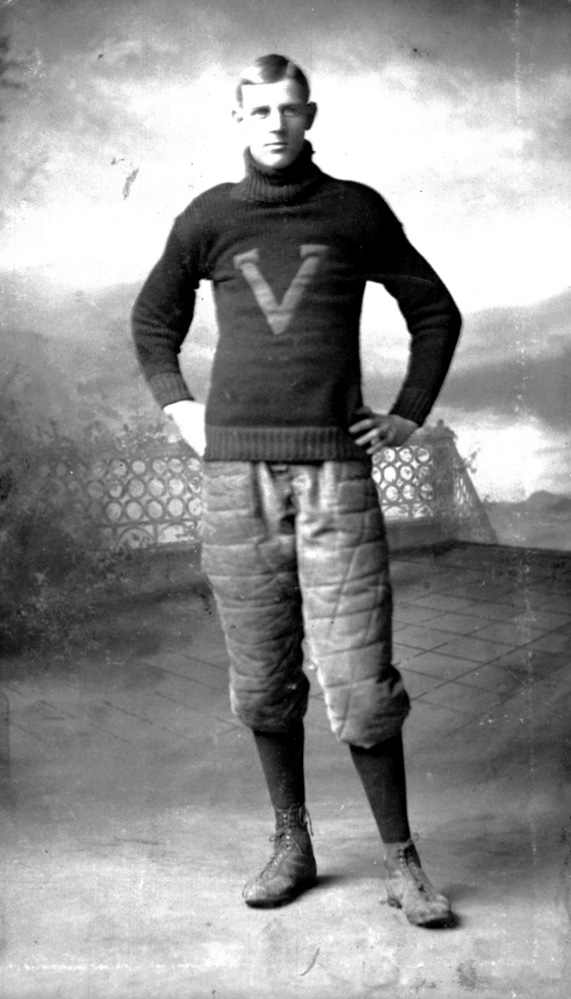
John Tigert played for Vanderbilt, and coached Kentucky.

=== 1896: First game ===
The first game between Vanderbilt and Kentucky (then known as Kentucky State) was played in Nashville on October 10, 1896. Vanderbilt won the first game, 6–0, with Vanderbilt's captain and fullback, Phil Connell, making a touchdown and kicking the goal after touchdown.

=== 1897: Vanderbilt's biggest win ===
On the same day Richard Von Albade Gammon was injured in the Georgia–Virginia contest, Southern Intercollegiate Athletic Conference (SIAA) champion Vanderbilt beat Kentucky by 50–0, Kentucky's worst defeat in the history of the rivalry.

=== 1901: Tigert's first game ===
John J. Tigert playing in his first ever game, and John Edgerton, helped SIAA champion Vanderbilt defeat Kentucky in 1901 by a score of 22–0. Vanderbilt was much faster, and its starting quarterback Fred Hume weighed just 122 pounds.

=== 1906: McGugin dominates Kentucky ===
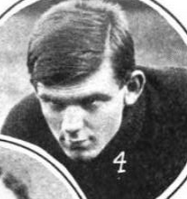
Bob Blake completed the first touchdown pass in the history of the rivalry.

Vanderbilt Hall of Fame coach Dan McGugin faced Kentucky for the first time with the SIAA champion 1906 team, one of the South's greatest, defeating Kentucky 28–0, gaining 630 yards while Kentucky did not manage a first down.

=== 1907: Vanderbilt wins easy, tosses touchdown pass ===
SIAA champion Vanderbilt beat Kentucky 40–0 in 1907. The forward pass was just made legal in 1906, and Vanderbilt executed a triple pass trick play from Sam Costen, lateraling to Honus Craig, lateraling to Bob Blake who circled behind, who passed the ball deep to his brother Vaughn Blake, who sprinted to the goal, netting a 75-yard touchdown. (Note: Tigert and Blake were Vanderbilt's first Rhodes Scholars.)

=== 1911: Vandy beats Kentucky, Curlin kicks two field goals ===
The SIAA champion 1911 Vanderbilt Commodores defeated Kentucky 18–0. The first score came on a touchdown pass from Rabbi Robins to Enoch Brown. Ray Morrison ran in the second touchdown. Zach Curlin drop kicked two field goals.

=== 1916: Dedication of Stoll Field, Curry vs. Rodes ===
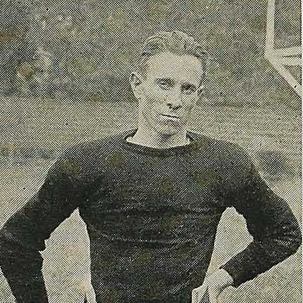
Rabbit Curry

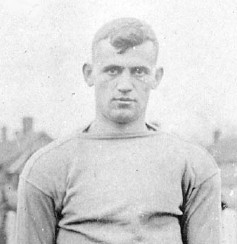
Doc Rodes

In 1916, the dedication for Stoll Field was celebrated during the Kentucky-Vanderbilt game. Vanderbilt won 45–0, giving Kentucky its only loss on the season. Kentucky was coached by Vanderbilt alum Tigert, and Rabbit Curry outplayed Doc Rodes, rushing for two touchdowns, one for 84 yards. Despite this, Vanderbilt coach Dan McGugin stated "If you would give me Doc Rodes, I would say he was a greater player than Curry." At season's end, Curry and Rodes were both selected All-Southern, and Curry was selected third-team All-American.

=== 1917: Hard-fought game ===
In 1917, Vanderbilt defeated Kentucky 5–0 in a hard-fought game, scoring with a field goal and a safety.

=== 1918: Vandy wins War football ===
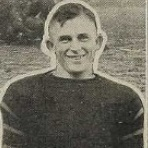
Grailey Berryhill

With players out due to World War I, Vanderbilt defeated Kentucky 33–0, recovering fumbled snaps, blocking punts, catching forward passes, and seeing the running of Grailey Berryhill.

=== 1919: Scoreless tie ===
Vanderbilt dominated the series in the early years of competition. Between 1896 and 1938, the programs played 17 games. Vanderbilt won 16 of those games, the only exception being a scoreless tie in 1919.

=== 1920: Kentucky still held scoreless ===
Vanderbilt defeated Kentucky 20–0. Touchdown runs were had by Pink Wade and Swayne Latham, after Grailey Berryhill recovered an onside kick. Berryhill had a 70-yard punt return for a touchdown down the right sideline.

=== 1921: Vanderbilt wins, Kentucky scores ===
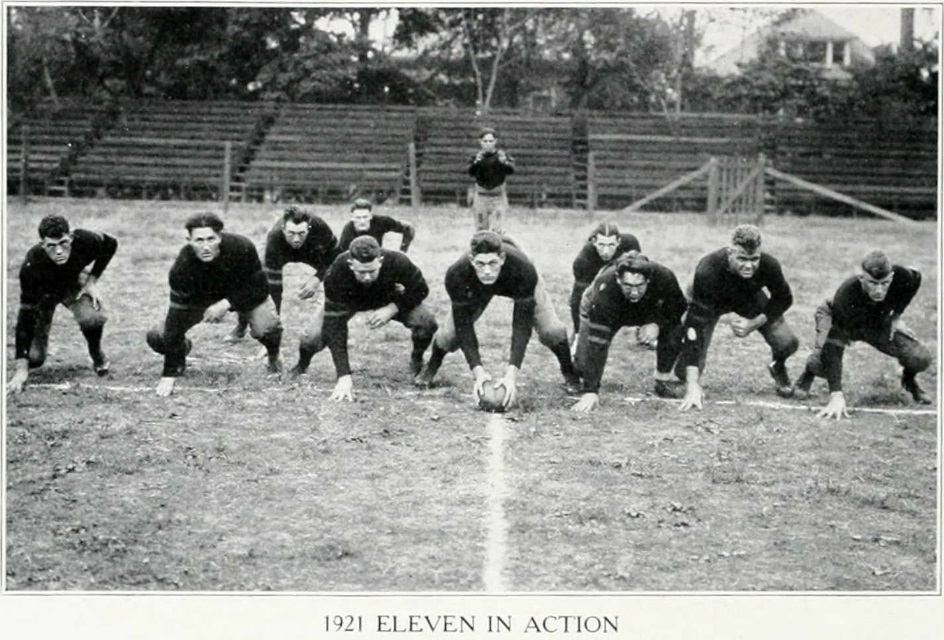
1921 Vanderbilt team, in a short punt formation.

In 1921, after being shut out by SIAA co-champion Vanderbilt in 11 consecutive games, Kentucky scored two touchdowns but lost by a 21–14 score. The Lexington Herald reported, "That Nashville is intensely interested in the outcome of the game is evidenced by the fact that a special wire, giving the game play by play, will be installed at the field and connected with the Nashville papers". A sportswriter called it "the hardest-fought battle that has been staged on the Kentucky gridiron in many a day". According to Bruce Dudley, the Commodores were outplayed by the Wildcats for three quarters. Kentucky completed 10 out of 20 passes, including passes between quarterback Bobby Lavin and Fuller.

Frank Godchaux and Rupe Smith scored Vanderbilt's touchdowns, with Smith scoring twice. Birkett Pribble scored for Kentucky. Godchaux scored after Pribble fumbled on the 10-yard line. Lavin scored Kentucky's final touchdown, after a Jess Neely punt was blocked.

=== 1922: Freddie Meiers runs on Kentucky ===
The SoCon champion 1922 Vanderbilt Commodores defeated Kentucky 9–0. Freddie Meiers was the star of the game, running in a touchdown. Hek Wakefield also drop kicked a field goal.

=== 1927: Spears beats Kentucky ===
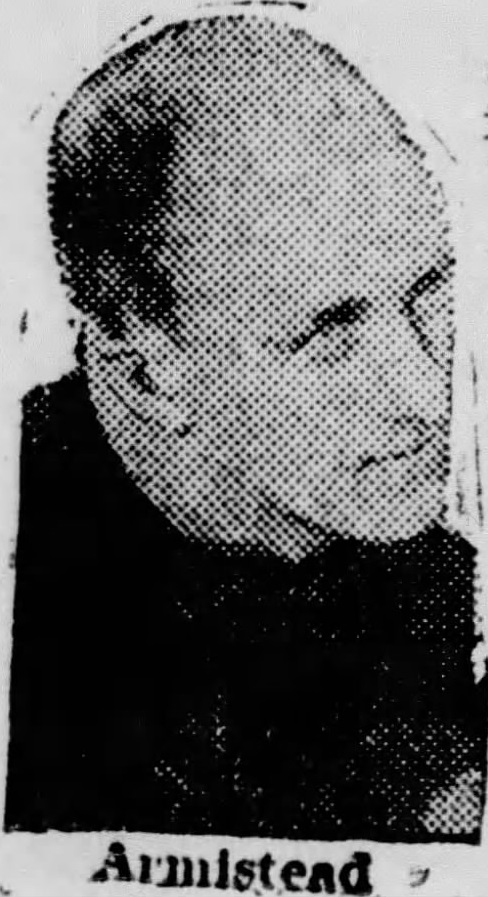
Jimmy Armistead

Vanderbilt beat Kentucky 34–6 as Bill Spears completed 9 out of 15 passes.

=== 1928: Vanderbilt wins a close game ===
In 1928, Vanderbilt beat Kentucky 14–7, with touchdowns by Jimmy Armistead and Bill Schwartz, after a 55-yard kickoff return from Armistead. A 35-yard Covington pass to Carey Spicer got Kentucky's touchdown.

=== 1937: Vanderbilt wins in the rain ===
Vanderbilt won in the rain 12–0.

=== 1938: Vandy beats Kirwan ===
Ab Kirwan's first game against Vanderbilt saw Vanderbilt win 14–7.

=== 1939: Kentucky's first victory ===
Kentucky won its first game in the series in 1939, defeating Vanderbilt by a 21–13 score before a crowd of 10,000 in Nashville. The Wildcats were led by the passing and running of sophomore Ermal Allen. Kentucky quarterback Joe Shepherd also intercepted a Vanderbilt pass and returned it 70 yards for a touchdown.

=== 1947: Bear Bryant upsets Vandy ===
1947 Kentucky football media guide.

Both teams were ranked, and the 1947 Kentucky Wildcats, coached by Bear Bryant, upset the Commodores 14–0.

=== 1969: Watson Brown stars ===
Watson Brown passed for three touchdowns, and returned a punt 62 yards for another, leading Vanderbilt to a 42–6 victory over Kentucky.

=== 1978: Kentucky blows out Vandy ===
The 1978 Kentucky Wildcats under Fran Curci gave Vanderbilt the worst defeat in the history of the rivalry, 53–2. Curci led Kentucky to a six-game winning streak over Vanderbilt from 1976 to 1981, the school's longest in the history of the rivalry.

=== 2000: Vandy "No longer doormat" ===
The 2000 Vanderbilt Commodores beat Kentucky 24–20, its first SEC victory in 9 games going back to last season. Greg Zolman threw for three touchdowns.

=== 2003: Vanderbilt ends SEC win drought ===
Vanderbilt had not won an SEC game in 3 years, since defeating Kentucky in 2000. Jay Cutler threw four touchdown passes and Vanderbilt won 28–17.

=== 2022: Vanderbilt ends another SEC win drought in a thriller ===
Vanderbilt won its first conference game since 2019, clinched by an 8-yard touchdown pass to Will Sheppard with 32 seconds left.

== Game results ==
Series record sources: College Football Data Warehouse.

Kentucky victories	Vanderbilt victories	Tie games

No.	Date	Location	Winner	Score
1	October 10, 1896	Nashville, TN	Vanderbilt	6–0
2	October 30, 1897	Nashville, TN	Vanderbilt	50–0
3	October 5, 1901	Nashville, TN	Vanderbilt	22–0
4	October 6, 1906	Nashville, TN	Vanderbilt	28–0
5	October 5, 1907	Nashville, TN	Vanderbilt	40–0
6	November 11, 1911	Nashville, TN	Vanderbilt	18–0
7	October 14, 1916	Lexington, KY	Vanderbilt	45–0
8	October 20, 1917	Lexington, KY	Vanderbilt	5–0
9	November 2, 1918	Nashville, TN	Vanderbilt	33–0
10	November 1, 1919	Lexington, KY	Tie	0–0
11	October 30, 1920	Nashville, TN	Vanderbilt	20–0
12	October 15, 1921	Lexington, KY	Vanderbilt	21–14
13	November 11, 1922	Nashville, TN	Vanderbilt	9–0
14	October 29, 1927	Nashville, TN	Vanderbilt	34–6
15	November 3, 1928	Nashville, TN	Vanderbilt	14–7
16	September 25, 1937	Nashville, TN	Vanderbilt	12–0
17	October 8, 1938	Lexington, TN	Vanderbilt	14–7
18	October 7, 1939	Nashville, TN	Kentucky	21–13
19	October 12, 1940	Nashville, TN	Tie	7–7
20	October 11, 1941	Lexington, KY	Vanderbilt	39–15
21	October 10, 1942	Lexington, KY	Vanderbilt	7–6
22	October 20, 1945	Nashville, TN	Vanderbilt	19–6
23	October 19, 1946	Lexington, KY	Kentucky	10–7
24	October 18, 1947	Nashville, TN	#20 Kentucky	14–0
25	October 16, 1948	Lexington, KY	Vanderbilt	26–7
26	November 7, 1953	Nashville, TN	#14 Kentucky	40–14
27	November 6, 1954	Lexington, KY	Kentucky	19–7
28	November 5, 1955	Nashville, TN	Vanderbilt	34–0
29	November 10, 1956	Lexington, KY	Kentucky	7–6
30	November 9, 1957	Nashville, TN	Vanderbilt	12–7
31	November 8, 1958	Lexington, KY	Tie	0–0
32	November 7, 1959	Nashville, TN	Vanderbilt	11–6
33	November 5, 1960	Lexington, KY	Kentucky	27–0
34	November 11, 1961	Nashville, TN	Kentucky	16–3
35	November 10, 1962	Lexington, KY	Kentucky	7–0
36	November 9, 1963	Nashville, TN	Tie	0–0
37	November 7, 1964	Lexington, TN	Kentucky	22–21
38	November 6, 1965	Nashville, TN	#10 Kentucky	34–0
39	November 5, 1966	Lexington, KY	Kentucky	14–10
40	November 11, 1967	Nashville, TN	Kentucky	12–7
41	November 9, 1968	Lexington, KY	Vanderbilt	6–0
42	November 8, 1969	Nashville, TN	Vanderbilt	42–6
43	November 7, 1970	Lexington, KY	Vanderbilt	18–17
44	November 6, 1971	Nashville, TN	Kentucky	14–7
45	November 11, 1972	Lexington, KY	Kentucky	14–13
46	November 10, 1973	Nashville, TN	Kentucky	27–17
47	November 9, 1974	Lexington, KY	Kentucky	38–12
48	November 8, 1975	Nashville, TN	Vanderbilt	13–3
49	November 6, 1976	Lexington, KY	Kentucky	14–0
50	November 5, 1977	Nashville, TN	#7 Kentucky	28–6
51	November 11, 1978	Lexington, KY	Kentucky	53–2

No.	Date	Location	Winner	Score
52	November 10, 1979	Nashville, TN	Kentucky	29–10
53	November 8, 1980	Lexington, KY	Kentucky	31–10
54	November 7, 1981	Nashville, TN	Kentucky	17–10
55	November 6, 1982	Lexington, KY	Vanderbilt	23–10
56	November 5, 1983	Nashville, TN	Kentucky	17–8
57	November 10, 1984	Lexington, KY	Kentucky	27–18
58	November 9, 1985	Nashville, TN	Vanderbilt	31–24
59	November 8, 1986	Lexington, KY	Kentucky	34–22
60	November 7, 1987	Nashville, TN	Vanderbilt	38–29
61	November 5, 1988	Lexington, KY	Kentucky	14–13
62	November 11, 1989	Nashville, TN	Kentucky	15–11
63	November 10, 1990	Lexington, KY	Kentucky	28–21
64	November 9, 1991	Nashville, TN	Vanderbilt	17–7
65	November 7, 1992	Lexington, KY	Vanderbilt	20–7
66	November 6, 1993	Nashville, TN	Vanderbilt	12–7
67	November 5, 1994	Lexington, KY	Vanderbilt	24–6
68	November 4, 1995	Nashville, TN	Vanderbilt	14–10
69	November 16, 1996	Lexington, KY	Kentucky	25–0
70	November 15, 1997	Nashville, TN	Kentucky	21–10
71	November 14, 1998	Lexington, KY	Kentucky	55–17
72	November 13, 1999	Nashville, TN	Kentucky	19–17
73	November 11, 2000	Lexington, KY	Vanderbilt	24–20
74	November 10, 2001	Nashville, TN	Kentucky	56–30
75	November 16, 2002	Lexington, KY	Kentucky	41–21
76	November 15, 2003	Nashville, TN	Vanderbilt	28–17
77	November 13, 2004	Lexington, KY	Kentucky	14–13
78	November 12, 2005	Nashville, TN	Kentucky	48–43
79	November 11, 2006	Lexington, KY	Kentucky	38–26
80	November 10, 2007	Nashville, TN	#24 Kentucky	27–20
81	November 15, 2008	Lexington, KY	Vanderbilt	31–24
82	November 14, 2009	Nashville, TN	Kentucky	24–13
83	November 13, 2010	Lexington, KY	Kentucky	38–20
84	November 12, 2011	Nashville, TN	Vanderbilt	38–8
85	November 3, 2012	Lexington, KY	Vanderbilt	40–0
86	November 16, 2013	Nashville, TN	Vanderbilt	22–6
87	September 27, 2014	Lexington, KY	Kentucky	17–7
88	November 14, 2015	Nashville, TN	Vanderbilt	21–17
89	October 8, 2016	Lexington, KY	Kentucky	20–13
90	November 11, 2017	Nashville, TN	Kentucky	44–21
91	October 20, 2018	Lexington, KY	#14 Kentucky	14–7
92	November 16, 2019	Nashville, TN	Kentucky	38–14
93	November 14, 2020	Lexington, KY	Kentucky	38–35
94	November 13, 2021	Nashville, TN	Kentucky*	34–17
95	November 12, 2022	Lexington, KY	Vanderbilt	24–21
96	September 23, 2023	Nashville, TN	Kentucky	45–28
97	October 12, 2024	Lexington, KY	Vanderbilt	20–13
98	November 22, 2025	Nashville, TN	#14 Vanderbilt	45–17
99	October 24, 2026	Lexington, KY	#12 Kentucky	34–17
Series: Kentucky leads 49–45–4
*Kentucky vacated all 2021 wins in August 2024.

== See also ==
- List of NCAA college football rivalry games
