= Johnny Floyd =

American sports player and coach (1891–1965)

- Floyd pictured in Midlander 1939, Middle Tennessee yearbook

Biographical details
- Born: July 14, 1891; Murfreesboro, Tennessee, U.S.
- Died: July 20, 1965 (aged 74); Shelbyville, Tennessee, U.S.

Playing career

Football
- 1915–1916: Vanderbilt
- 1919–1920: Vanderbilt

Basketball
- 1919–1920: Vanderbilt
- Positions: Halfback (football); Guard (basketball)

Coaching career (HC unless noted)

Football
- 1917: Middle Tennessee State Normal
- 1927–1928: Vanderbilt (assistant)
- 1929: Auburn (line)
- 1929: Auburn
- 1930–1931: The Citadel
- 1935–1938: Middle Tennessee State Teachers
- c. 1941: Rice (assistant)

Basketball
- 1927–1929: Vanderbilt
- 1935–1939: Middle Tennessee State Teachers

Baseball
- 1929: Auburn
- 1936–1939: Middle Tennessee State Teachers

Administrative career (AD unless noted)
- 1930–1931: The Citadel

Head coaching record
- Overall: 39–21–4 (football); 22–53 (basketball)

Accomplishments and honors

Championships
- Football; 2 SIAA (1935–1936)

John Cullom "Red" Floyd (July 14, 1891 – July 20, 1965) was an American college football and college basketball player and coach. He played football at Vanderbilt University with such greats as Irby "Rabbit" Curry and Josh Cody, captaining the 1920 Vanderbilt Commodores football team. He served as the head football coach at Middle Tennessee State University (1917, 1935–1938), Auburn University (1929), and The Citadel (1930–1931), compiling a career college football record of 39–21–4. Floyd was also the head basketball coach at Vanderbilt University from 1927 to 1929 and at Middle Tennessee from 1935 to 1939, tallying a career college basketball mark of 22–53.

== Coaching career ==
In 1917, Floyd entered his first stint as a head coach at Middle Tennessee, and had a record of 7–0. Jess Neely was a member of the 1917 team. He was head coach of the Auburn Tigers baseball team during the 1929 season. That fall, he coached Auburn's football team, and compiled an 0–4 record. From 1930 to 1931, he coached at The Citadel, and compiled a 9–9–3 record. In August 1935, Floyd was appointed head football coach at Middle Tennessee, succeeding E. M. Waller.

== Death ==
Floyd died on July 20, 1965, at Bedford County General Hospital in Shelbyville, Tennessee.

== Head coaching record ==
=== Football ===
Year	Team	Overall	Conference	Standing	Bowl/playoffs
Middle Tennessee State Normal (Independent) (1917)
1917	Middle Tennessee State Normal	7–0			
Auburn Tigers (Southern Conference) (1929)
1929	Auburn	0–4 (Note: George Bohler coached the first five games of the season.)	0–4	23rd	
Auburn:		0–4	0–4		
The Citadel Bulldogs (Southern Intercollegiate Athletic Association) (1930–1931)
1930	The Citadel	4–5–2	3–1–1	9th	
1931	The Citadel	5–4–1	4–1	6th	
The Citadel:		9–9–3	7–2–1		
Middle Tennessee State Teachers Blue Raiders (Southern Intercollegiate Athletic Association) (1935–1938)
1935	Middle Tennessee State Teachers	8–0	5–0	1st	
1936	Middle Tennessee State Teachers	7–1	4–0	T–1st	
1937	Middle Tennessee State Teachers	6–1–1	2–1–1	T–10th	
1938	Middle Tennessee State Teachers	2–6	1–5	26th	
Middle Tennessee State Normal/Teachers:		30–8–1	12–6–1		
Total:		39–21–4			
National championship Conference title Conference division title or championship game berth

== See also ==
- List of college football head coaches with non-consecutive tenure
