= Frank Godchaux Sr. =

Frank Godchaux
- Born: November 29, 1879; Abbeville, Louisiana, U.S.
- Died: July 3, 1965 (aged 85); Jefferson Parish, Louisiana, U.S.
- Burial place: Graceland Cemetery; Abbeville, LA
- Occupation: President of Louisiana Rice Milling Company
- Spouse: Agnes Jackson Putnam Godchaux
- Children: Frank Area Godchaux, Jr.
- Parents: Gustave Godchaux (father); Katherine Area Godchaux (mother)
- Football career

Profile
- Position: Quarterback

Career information
- College: LSU (1897); Vanderbilt (1899–1900)

Frank Area Godchaux Sr. (November 29, 1879 – July 3, 1965) was a president of the Louisiana Rice Milling Company, a $10,000,000 corporation. He was a letterman and quarterback for the Vanderbilt Commodores on the 1899 team, transferring from LSU in 1897. He and his son Frank Godchaux Jr were the first father-son Vandy lettermen. Godchaux Sr. was the only child of pioneering merchant Gustave Godchaux, whose parents came from France to Louisiana.

== See also ==
- Detailed and extensive document of the cattle farms of Frank A. Godchaux Jr. and Sr. in Vermilion Parish.
