= Howard Boogher =

American football player, attorney, and businessman (1876–1933)

- Born: January 2, 1876; St. Louis, Missouri, U.S.
- Died: March 7, 1933
- Football career

Profile
- Position: End

Career information
- College: Vanderbilt (1897)

Awards and highlights
- SIAA championship (1897); 1912 All-time Vandy team

Howard Murray Boogher (January 2, 1876 – March 7, 1933) was a college football player, attorney, and once president of the Boogher, Force & Goodbar Hat Company. Boogher was captain of the Southern Intercollegiate Athletic Association champion 1897 Vanderbilt Commodores football team. He and Phil Connell dove to recover the ball after the victory in the school's rivalry game with Sewanee in 1897.
