= Sewanee–Vanderbilt football rivalry =

American college football rivalry

- Sewanee Tigers Vanderbilt Commodores
- Sport: Football
- First meeting: November 7, 1891; Vanderbilt 22, Sewanee 0
- Latest meeting: November 11, 1944; Vanderbilt 28, Sewanee 7
- Next meeting: Series defunct after Sewanee downgraded to D-III School

Statistics
- Total meetings: 52
- All-time series: Vanderbilt, 40–8–4
- Largest victory: Vanderbilt, 68–4 (1905)
- Longest win streak: Vanderbilt, 14 (1925–1941)
- Current win streak: Vanderbilt, 1 (1944)
- Locations in Tennessee

The Sewanee–Vanderbilt football rivalry was an American college football rivalry between the Sewanee Tigers and Vanderbilt Commodores. They were both founding members of the Southern Intercollegiate Athletic Association (SIAA), the Southern Conference, and the Southeastern Conference (SEC). Both teams' histories feature some powerhouses of early Southern football, e.g. 1899 Sewanee Tigers football team and 1906 Vanderbilt Commodores football team. It was the oldest of Vanderbilt's rivalries; dating back to 1891 when Vanderbilt played its second ever football game and Sewanee played its first. Vanderbilt leads the series 40–8–4. It used to be claimed as the oldest rivalry in the south, older than the "South's Oldest Rivalry" between North Carolina and Virginia. Usually played towards the end of the season on Veterans Day, the two teams have not met again since 1944.

The two universities are in the same state of Tennessee and are over 90 miles away from each other. A newspaper account of the rivalry reads: "Both schools look upon the game as the big feature of their schedule each year, no matter what other games are included, and it is always the biggest drawing card on either schedule." "Goodbye Sewanee goodbye" was even a song sung by Vanderbilt students.

== Game results ==
Sewanee victories	Vanderbilt victories	Tie games

No.	Date	Location	Winner	Score
1	November 7, 1891	Sewanee, TN	Vanderbilt	22–0
2	November 26, 1891	Nashville, TN	Vanderbilt	26–4
3	October 15, 1892	Sewanee, TN	Sewanee	22–4
4	November 12, 1892	Nashville, TN	Sewanee	28–14
5	October 28, 1893	Sewanee, TN	Vanderbilt	10–8
6	November 30, 1893	Nashville, TN	Vanderbilt	10–0
7	November 29, 1894	Nashville, TN	Vanderbilt	12–0
8	November 28, 1895	Nashville, TN	Vanderbilt	18–6
9	November 26, 1896	Sewanee, TN	Vanderbilt	10–4
10	November 25, 1897	Nashville, TN	Vanderbilt	10–0
11	November 24, 1898	Nashville, TN	Sewanee	19–4
12	November 17, 1900	Nashville, TN	Sewanee	11–10
13	November 16, 1901	Nashville, TN	Tie	0–0
14	November 27, 1902	Nashville, TN	Sewanee	11–5
15	November 26, 1903	Nashville, TN	Vanderbilt	10–5
16	November 24, 1904	Nashville, TN	Vanderbilt	27–0
17	November 30, 1905	Nashville, TN	Vanderbilt	68–4
18	November 29, 1906	Nashville, TN	Vanderbilt	20–0
19	November 28, 1907	Nashville, TN	Vanderbilt	17–12
20	November 26, 1908	Nashville, TN	Tie	6–6
21	November 25, 1909	Nashville, TN	Sewanee	16–5
22	November 24, 1910	Nashville, TN	Vanderbilt	23–6
23	November 30, 1911	Nashville, TN	Vanderbilt	31–0
24	November 28, 1912	Nashville, TN	Vanderbilt	16–0
25	November 27, 1913	Nashville, TN	Vanderbilt	63–13
26	November 26, 1914	Nashville, TN	Sewanee	14–13
27	November 25, 1915	Nashville, TN	Vanderbilt	27–3

No.	Date	Location	Winner	Score
28	November 30, 1916	Nashville, TN	Tie	0–0
29	November 29, 1917	Nashville, TN	Vanderbilt	13–6
30	November 28, 1918	Nashville, TN	Vanderbilt	40–0
31	November 27, 1919	Nashville, TN	Vanderbilt	33–21
32	November 25, 1920	Nashville, TN	Vanderbilt	21–3
33	November 24, 1921	Nashville, TN	Vanderbilt	9–0
34	November 30, 1922	Nashville, TN	Vanderbilt	26–0
35	November 29, 1923	Nashville, TN	Vanderbilt	7–0
36	November 27, 1924	Nashville, TN	Sewanee	16–0
37	November 26, 1925	Nashville, TN	Vanderbilt	19–7
38	November 25, 1926	Nashville, TN	Vanderbilt	13–0
39	November 24, 1927	Nashville, TN	Vanderbilt	26–6
40	November 29, 1928	Nashville, TN	Vanderbilt	13–0
41	November 28, 1929	Nashville, TN	Vanderbilt	26–6
42	November 11, 1933	Nashville, TN	Vanderbilt	27–14
43	November 10, 1934	Nashville, TN	Vanderbilt	19–0
44	November 9, 1935	Nashville, TN	Vanderbilt	46–0
45	November 7, 1936	Nashville, TN	Vanderbilt	14–0
46	November 6, 1937	Nashville, TN	Vanderbilt	41–0
47	November 5, 1938	Nashville, TN	Vanderbilt	14–0
48	November 11, 1939	Nashville, TN	Vanderbilt	25–7
49	November 9, 1940	Nashville, TN	Vanderbilt	20–0
50	November 8, 1941	Nashville, TN	Vanderbilt	20–0
51	October 7, 1944	Nashville, TN	Tie	0–0
52	November 11, 1944	Nashville, TN	Vanderbilt	28–7
Series: Vanderbilt leads 40–8–4

== Notable games ==
=== 1891: Sewanee's first game; Vanderbilt's second ===
Sewanee's first ever football game, and Vanderbilt's second, was the first instance of this rivalry at McGee Field on November 7, 1891. Vanderbilt won 22 to 0. McGee Field is the oldest stadium in the south still in use, and the fourth oldest in the nation.

=== 1893: Vanderbilt wins by extra points ===
"In one of the most hotly contested games of football ever seen on a Tennessee field" each team scored two touchdowns, but Vanderbilt made their extra points and won 10 to 8.

=== 1897: Vanderbilt gives Sewanee Hell ===
Vanderbilt beat Sewanee 10–0. A shocking event occurred in 1897 at the Thanksgiving Day match with Sewanee on the original Dudley Field. The word "hell" had been used in the line of a popular cheer on campus by Vanderbilt students and spread into events as football. This caused uproar with the university administration and the city of Nashville.

Both teams began passing the ball around to limber up. Throughout this preliminary, the students of both colleges gave their respective yells and sang their several songs written for the occasion. There was one yell by the Vanderbilt students which was very offensive to decent people. It starts off "Hippity Huz, Hippity Huz; What in the hell is the matter with us." It had become so popular at Vanderbilt that it was in the minds and caused them to be oblivious to the fact that it was not exactly proper to shock refined ladies by such utterances.

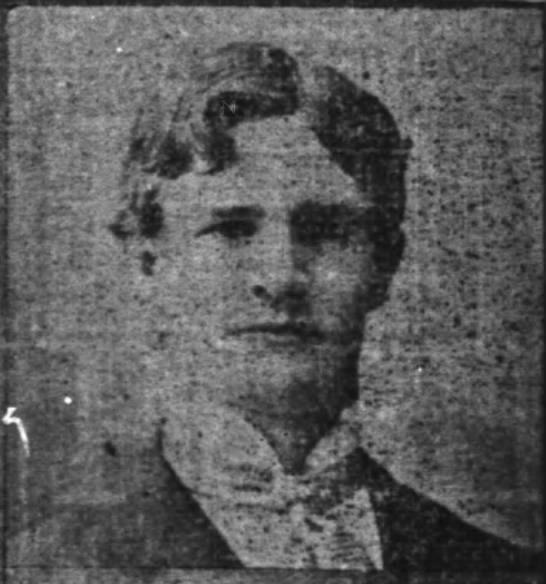
Phil Connell

Phil Connell and captain Howard Boogher dove to recover the ball after the victory, giving Vanderbilt its first conference title.

=== 1899: Sewanee's greatest team; no game with Vanderbilt ===
Sewanee manager Luke Lea, after a disagreement with Vanderbilt over gate receipts resulting in the 1899 game being cancelled, sought a way to make up for the lost revenue. In response, Lea put together an improbable schedule of playing five big name opponents in six days. Playing so many games in a short period minimized costs while maximizing revenue. During this road trip, Sewanee outscored its opponents for a combined 91–0, including Texas, Texas A&M, LSU, and Ole Miss. Sewanee obliterated each one, traveling by train for some 2,500 miles. This feat, barring fundamental changes in modern-day football, can never be equaled. Contemporary sources called the road trip the most remarkable ever made by an American college team.

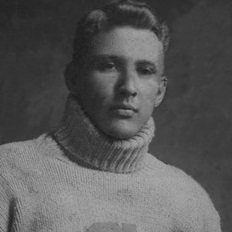
Henry D. Phillips

=== 1900: Sewanee edges Vanderbilt ===
Vanderbilt made two touchdowns and Sewanee one, but Vanderbilt failed to make its extra points.

=== 1902: Sewanee drubs Vandy ===
Sewanee defeated Vanderbilt in a surprising 11 to 5 upset. John Edgerton's touchdown was the first Vanderbilt had scored on Sewanee since 1897. Captain Henry D. Phillips made Sewanee's touchdown.

=== 1903: Vanderbilt upsets Sewanee ===
1903 met difficulty in determining an SIAA champion. Clemson's John Heisman pushed strongly for Cumberland to share the SIAA title with Clemson, but also originally scheduled a game with the Vanderbilt-Sewanee winner to decide the conference. Cumberland's strongest victory was its win over Vanderbilt.

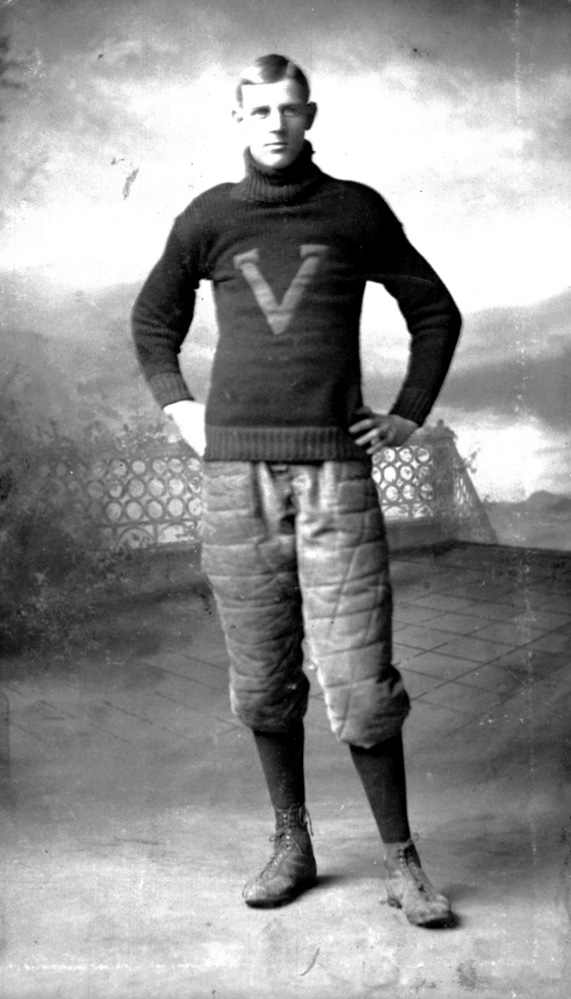
John Tigert

John J. Tigert, later a prominent educator, got Vanderbilt's first touchdown, and thus was the first person to score on the Tigers all season.

=== 1905: Vanderbilt drubs Sewanee ===
Vanderbilt crushed a strong Sewanee squad 68–4. One publication claims "The first scouting done in the South was in 1905, when Dan McGugin and Captain Innis Brown, of Vanderbilt went to Atlanta to see Sewanee play Georgia Tech." John Scarbrough made Sewanee's only points on a 35-yard field goal. On the dedication of Harris Stadium, one writer noted "The University of the South has numbered among its athletes some of the greatest. Anyone who played against giant Henry Phillips in 1901–1903 felt that he was nothing less than the best as guard and fullback. Anyone who ever saw a punt from the foot of J. W. Scarbrough." Honus Craig once ran 60 yards for a touchdown.

=== 1907: Grantland Rice's Greatest Thrill ===
In the second year of the legal forward pass Vanderbilt won the SIAA championship on a double-pass play. Sewanee led 12 to 11 with twelve minutes to play. At McGugin's signal, the Commodores went into a freakish formation in which Stein Stone remained at center but all other players shifted to his left. Quarterback Hugh Potts took the snap and lateraled the ball to Vaughn Blake, who lateraled it across to Bob Blake, who had lined up deep in punt formation, as Stone ran down the field. Blake then connected with Stone on a 35-yard pass down inside the 5-yard line. Honus Craig ran in it to win the game. It was cited by Grantland Rice as the greatest thrill he ever witnessed in his years of watching sports.

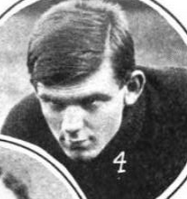
Bob Blake

Vanderbilt coach Dan McGugin in Spalding's Football Guide's summation of the season in the SIAA wrote "The standing. First, Vanderbilt; second, Sewanee, a might good second;" and that Aubrey Lanier "came near winning the Vanderbilt game by his brilliant dashes after receiving punts." Innis Brown recalled that Sewanee was likely the South's best team that year.

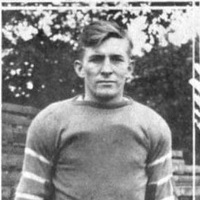
Lee Tolley

=== 1909: Sewanee's last SIAA title ===
Sewanee beat Vanderbilt 16–5, giving Vanderbilt its first loss to a Southern team in six years. and netting the SIAA championship for Sewanee. "Moise, for Sewanee, played the game of his life."

=== 1914: Tolley leads Tigers over Vanderbilt ===
Sewanee quarterback Lee Tolley was awarded a gold football charm to commemorate the 14 to 13 victory. One account reads "For brilliance and beauty of execution, (Tolley's play) has had few equals, if any, in the South, and the Tiger leader retires from the game as the premier quarterback in the S.I.A.A., beyond a doubt." His performance included a 75-yard punt return for a touchdown.

=== 1921: Vanderbilt's muddiest game ===
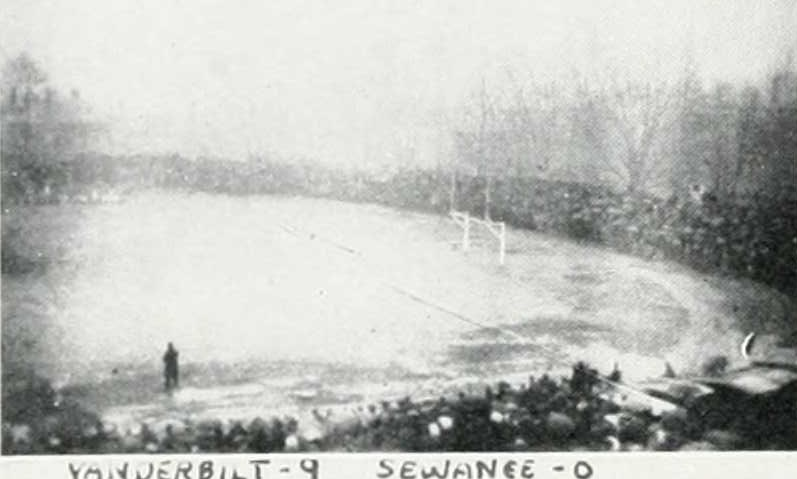
A soaked Curry Field.

The Commodores closed the season with a 9 to 0 win over Sewanee in the "muddiest game" in its history. The Commodores were supposedly knee-deep in mud and water, with players unrecognizable. The two teams were considered a fairly even match before the game. Sewanee felt confident its line gave them a chance to win, but also a bit nervous about Vanderbilt's passing attack. In a game for bragging rights and the Southern Intercollegiate Athletic Association title, Lynn Bomar would be injured.

The game went scoreless until the fourth quarter, when Sewanee fumbled the snap on a punt and the punter was smothered by Jess Neely, Frank Godchaux, and Pink Wade for a safety. Later in the fourth, Hek Wakefield would punt the ball 54 yards from his own 38 yard-line, and Elam recovered a fumble by Sewanee's Powers. Wakefield ran in the game's only touchdown off-tackle from about 5 yards out. Wakefield kicked goal. Sewanee had more first downs than Vanderbilt, six to Vandy's two, but suffered four successive fumbles.

=== 1923: Alf Williams Greatest Thrill ===
Sports enthusiast Alf Williams claimed the 1923 team game was his greatest thrill. Again the game was drenched in rain, with hay on the field to soak it up. A touchdown pass from Doc Kuhn to Gil Reese won the game.

=== 1924: Sewanee's last and greatest victory ===
Sewanee won for the first time in a decade by the score of 16–0. The student newspaper The Sewanee Purple labeled it "The Greatest Victory for Sewanee in Its Thirty-one Years of Football History." Vanderbilt coach Dan McGugin stated "Sewanee played a brilliant, sustained game. It was her day all the way." Michigan coach Fielding Yost said of the game, "It was one of those days when everything you try goes wrong and everything the other fellow tries goes right. Sewanee played great football." Gil Reese was relatively controlled and Bob Rives' line play was adequately challenged. Gil Reese and Fatty Lawrence starred for the Commodores. Sewanee's backfield of captain Harris, Gibbons, Barker, and Mahoney "clicked to perfection" and its line received much praise as well. It's the last time Sewanee has beaten Vanderbilt.

== See also ==
- List of NCAA college football rivalry games
