= Percy Conyers =

American physician and former football player (1898–1966)

No. 18
- Position: End

Personal information
- Born: January 23, 1898; Halls, Tennessee, U.S.
- Died: October 15, 1966 (aged 68); Dyersburg, Tennessee, U.S.
- Listed height: 5 ft 8 in (1.73 m)
- Listed weight: 150 lb (68 kg)

Career information
- High school: Union Academy
- College: Vanderbilt (1917, 1920–1922)

Awards and highlights
- SIAA championship (1921); SoCon Championship (1922)

Percy Alford Conyers (January 23, 1898 – October 15, 1966) was a physician in Dyersburg, Tennessee. As a youth he was a college football player for coach Dan McGugin's Vanderbilt Commodores. After the 1920 season, Vanderbilt opponents gained less on punt returns than against any other team in the south, due to the covering of Conyers and Jess Neely. Conyers was one of the team's smallest players.
