= Phil Connell =

American football player and businessman (1874–1932)

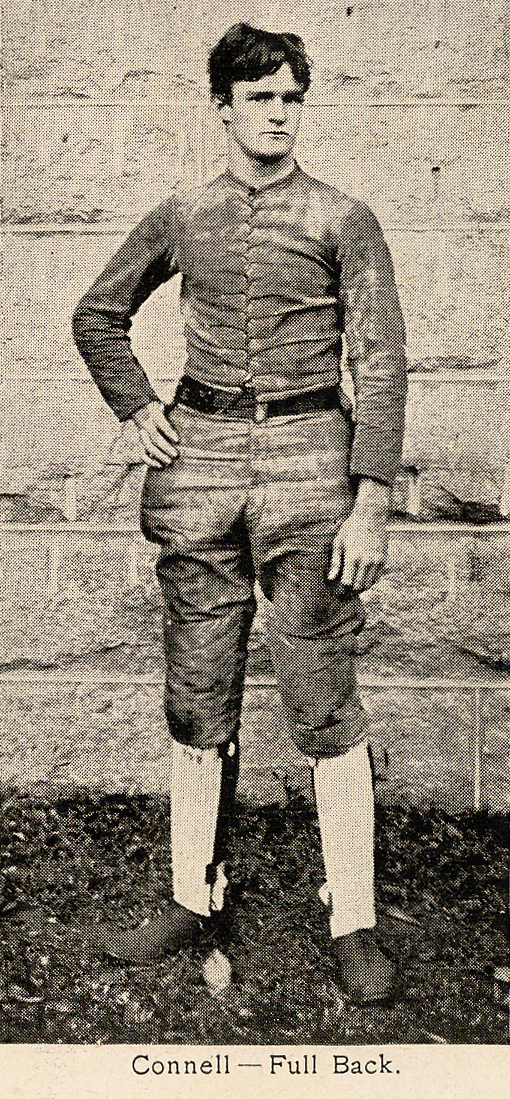
- Born: William Phillip Connell; August 24, 1874; Nashville, Tennessee, U.S.
- Died: February 13, 1932 (aged 57); Mexico
- Occupation: business man
- Football career

Profile
- Position: Fullback/Halfback
- Class: 1896

Career information
- College: Vanderbilt (1892–1897)

Awards and highlights
- SIAA championship (1897); All-time Vanderbilt first team (1912); All-Southern sub (1895)

William Phillip Connell (August 24, 1874 – February 13, 1932) was an American college football player and later a prominent business man of Baton Rouge, Louisiana.

== Vanderbilt University ==
He was a running back for the Vanderbilt Commodores football team of Vanderbilt University. Considered one of the sport's early greats, he was picked for an all-time Vanderbilt team in 1912. Connell was captain of the 1895 and 1896 teams.

=== 1892 ===
The oldest team in the memory of Grantland Rice was the 1892 team. Rice claimed Connell then would be a good player in any era.

=== 1894 ===
Connel featured in Vanderbilt's first ever defeat of Ole Miss in 1894, giving the school its only loss of the season by the score of 40 to 0.

=== 1895 ===
Connell was selected as a substitute for the All-Southern team.

=== 1897 ===
He and captain Howard Boogher dove to recover the ball after the victory in the school's rivalry game with Sewanee in 1897. Vanderbilt allowed no points on the season and split a claim to the championship of the south when it held Virginia to a scoreless tie. Caspar Whitney said he was the South's finest football player.

Connell won Bachelor of Ugliness.
