= Swayne Latham =

American football player (1898–1988)

Profile
- Position: Quarterback/Kicker

Personal information
- Born: January 24, 1898; Memphis, Tennessee, U.S.
- Died: February 8, 1988 (aged 90); Memphis, Tennessee, U.S.
- Listed height: 5 ft 8 in (1.73 m)
- Listed weight: 140 lb (64 kg)

Career information
- High school: Central
- College: Vanderbilt (1919–1920)

Awards and highlights
- All-Southern (1919)

Swayne Latham (January 24, 1898 – February 8, 1988) was a college football player. He was then manager of the Memphis and Little Rock offices of B. F. Goodrich Rubber Co.

== Vanderbilt University ==
He was a prominent quarterback for Dan McGugin's Vanderbilt Commodores football teams of Vanderbilt University.

=== 1919 ===
In 1919, Latham was selected All-Southern by Stuart Towe, of the Knoxville Journal and Tribune.

=== 1920 ===
Fred Russell's Fifty Years of Vanderbilt Football gives the year of 1920 the title "One of Most Difficult Schedules." It recalls the Virginia game which ended in a tie. With two minutes left in the game, Virginia was at Vanderbilt's 5-yard line with a 4th down and 1 to go. A newspaper account recalls the play, "There leaped a streak of Gold and Black. It was Swayne Latham, crippled and confined to the sideline for the early part of the game, who intercepted the ball and broke around right end. Commodores mowed down a path as he fought his way into the clear. On he raced up the sideline, 50, 60, 70, 80 yards to Virginia's 15, where his injured ankle could no longer outdistance Virginia's defense. A tackler threw him to earth. The official called the play back. Both teams were off-side. The greatest run of the season went for naught."

== Personal life ==
He married Nathalie Davant on October 18, 1922.
