= Frank Godchaux =

American football and baseball player (1901–1978)

Frank Godchaux, Jr.
Profile
- Position: Halfback

Personal information
- Born: December 27, 1901; Abbeville, Louisiana, U.S.
- Died: November 4, 1978 (aged 76); Riverside, California, U.S.
- Listed weight: 153 lb (69 kg)

Career information
- High school: Woodberry Forest School
- College: Vanderbilt (1919–1921)

Awards and highlights
- SIAA championship (1921); SIAA championship (baseball) (1921)

Frank Area Godchaux Jr. (December 27, 1901 – November 4, 1978) was an American football and baseball player and golfer for the Vanderbilt Commodores of Vanderbilt University.

== Early life ==
Frank Area Godchaux Jr. was born on December 27, 1901, in Abbeville, Louisiana, to Frank Godchaux Sr. His father was a letterman and quarterback for the Commodores on the 1899 team, transferring from LSU in 1897, and once President of the Louisiana Rice Milling Company, a $10,000,000 corporation.

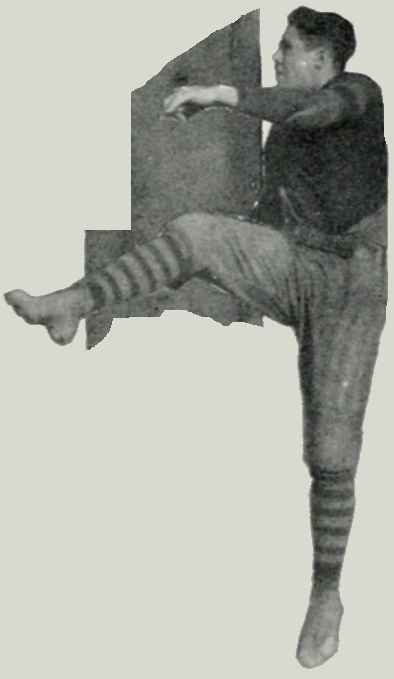
Godchaux c. 1921

== Vanderbilt University ==
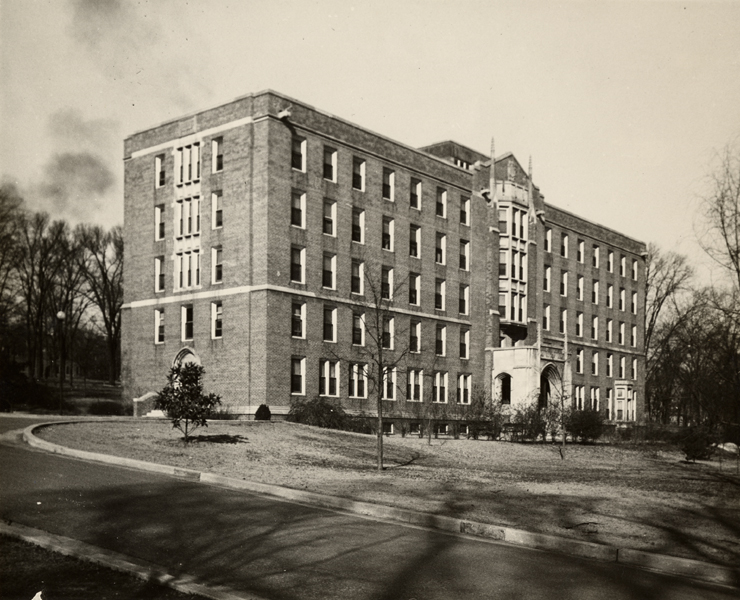
Godchaux Hall

Godchaux Hall at Vanderbilt University was named for his wife, Mary Ragland Godchaux. A Gothic building constructed in 1925 as a home for the School of Nursing, it now houses faculty and administrative offices, the Center for Nursing Research, and the Helene Fuld Multimedia Center. It was named for Mary Ragland in 1971.

=== 1921 ===
He was a member of the 1921 Southern Intercollegiate Athletic Association (SIAA) champion football and baseball teams.

==== Football ====
Godchaux was a prominent running back for Dan McGugin's Vanderbilt Commodores football teams. On the 1921 football team Godchaux was its second leading scorer behind Rupert Smith. Godchaux was the first son to follow in his father's footsteps as a Vanderbilt football player.

==== Baseball ====
On the 1921 baseball team, Frank Jr. was a catcher.

== See also ==
- Detailed and extensive document of the cattle farms of Frank A. Godchaux Jr. and Sr. in Vermilion Parish.
