= Grailey Berryhill =

American politician

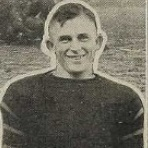
- Berryhill in football uniform, c. 1919

Member of the Tennessee House of Representatives from Tennessee
- In office 1967–1973

Personal details
- Born: August 17, 1896 McKenzie, Tennessee, U.S.
- Died: January 10, 1976 (aged 79) Jackson, Tennessee, U.S.
- Party: Republican
- Education: Vanderbilt University (MD)
- Occupation: Physician

Grailyn Hewitt "Grailey" Berryhill (August 17, 1896 – January 10, 1976) was an American football player, physician, and politician. He was a star running back for Dan McGugin's Vanderbilt Commodores of Vanderbilt University. He scored six touchdowns in the 76 to 0 win over Tennessee in 1918, and was captain-elect for 1921. Berryhill received one of the school's highest honors that a student could achieve, the "Bachelor of Ugliness". He was also a three-term member of the Tennessee General Assembly.

== Early years ==
Grailey Berryhill was born on August 17, 1896, in McKenzie, Tennessee, to Adam Douglas Berryhill and Harriett Costen.

== Vanderbilt ==
When Berryhill did not return to the 1921 Vanderbilt Commodores football team, sports writer Ferguson "Fuzzy" Woodruff wrote "While prospects seem fair to middling in most of the big southern colleges, there are two notable exceptions. Dan McGugin expects nothing of Vanderbilt this year. Dan has lost Berryhill, his only reliable backfield man, through the matrimonial route."

Berryhill graduated with an MD from Vanderbilt University in 1921.
