= Southern Intercollegiate Athletic Association =

Defunct American college athletic conference

- Association: NCAA
- Founded: 1892; 134 years ago
- Folded: 1942; 84 years ago
- No. of teams: 72 (total)
- Region: Southern United States; Deep South

Locations
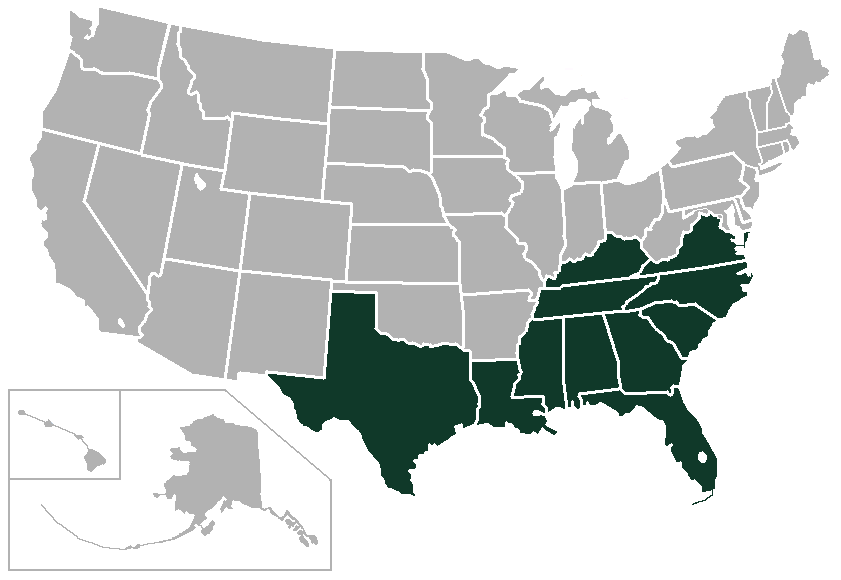

The Southern Intercollegiate Athletic Association (SIAA) was one of the first collegiate athletic conferences in the United States. Twenty-seven of the current Division I FBS (formerly Division I-A) football programs were members of this conference at some point, as were at least 19 other schools. Every member of the current Southeastern Conference except Arkansas, Missouri and Oklahoma, as well as six of the eighteen current members of the Atlantic Coast Conference formerly held membership in the SIAA.

== History ==
=== The first attempt (1892–1893) ===
During the week of Thanksgiving, 1892, southern football promoters organized a series of football games at Brisbane Park in Atlanta, Georgia, in an effort to crown a "Southern champion", calling it the "first championship series of football games ever held in the south". The idea soon grew into a plan to hold a yearly football championship around Thanksgiving determined by games played between the champions of five southern states. The organization overseeing the championship would be called the Southern Inter-Collegiate Athletic Association, which was originally planned to be formalized during the first football championship series taking place the week of November 21, 1892. It was envisioned to include two members from each of the five states: Alabama and Auburn from Alabama, Georgia and Georgia Tech from Georgia, North Carolina and Trinity (Duke) from North Carolina, Sewanee and Vanderbilt from Tennessee, and Virginia and Washington and Lee from Virginia. Charles Baskerville (North Carolina), Dr. George Petrie (Virginia), and Frank Spain (Georgia Tech) were the prominent promoters of the plan. However, the formation of the SIAA did not materialize during the championship series in Atlanta.

On December 28, 1892, members of the Virginia's athletic association organized a meeting of southern college athletic programs at Richmond's Exchange Hotel, with the purpose of organizing southern collegiate athletics, especially regular athletic championships in baseball, football, tennis, and track. Colleges present at the meeting were Alabama, Johns Hopkins, North Carolina, Saint John's (of Maryland), Sewanee, Tennessee, Virginia, and Wake Forest. Presiding over the first meeting was Dr. F. P. Venable, of North Carolina, and secretary was J. B. Robertson, of Virginia; Robertson was later elected as president, with W. S. Symington, of Johns Hopkins, elected as vice president, and W. H. Graham, of Sewanee, elected as secretary and treasurer.

The league was split into two "circuits", with the "Northern" one comprising Maryland, Virginia, and North Carolina, and the "Southern" one comprising Tennessee and Alabama; the champion of each circuit would play each other for the championship of the SIAA each year, with yearly championship matches scheduled for Thanksgiving for football and May 13 for baseball. Interestingly, whichever team won the championship in baseball had the privilege of naming the next session's president, while the winner of each year's football championship was to name the next vice president.

The original division of the teams had Virginia, North Carolina, Wake Forest, Johns Hopkins, and St. John's College in the Northern Division, and Tennessee, Sewanee, and Alabama in the Southern Division. In mid-February, a special session was held to add Vanderbilt to the Southern Division, resulting in a 5-team Northern Division and a 4-team Southern Division.

The league also took on the usual matters of interest in terms of purifying and organizing athletics at the time, including banning former professional players. The overall goal was generally to "encourage and stimulate athletics among colleges of the South."

After just one season of baseball, the Association was embroiled by controversy. Virginia had a straightforward claim to champion of the Northern Division; though Virginia and Johns Hopkins had been scheduled to meet in a game for champion of the Northern Division, Johns Hopkins forfeited the game after faculty forbade the team from leaving campus on May 3, the day the final division game had been scheduled for. The champion of the Southern Division was not so easily decided. On May 11, 1893, after a full season of SIAA baseball play, an arbitration committee set out to determine whether Vanderbilt, Alabama, or Sewanee had topped the Southern Division, as the teams had a split record with no clear winner. This was made more difficult due to an eligibility controversy between Vanderbilt and Alabama, with Vanderbilt claiming that two Alabama baseball players were ineligible due to professionalism rules. Owing to this, Vanderbilt claimed Alabama should forfeit two wins to Vanderbilt, despite losing one of the games 2–1.

Eventually, the arbitrators decided in favor of Vanderbilt, leaving a contest between Vanderbilt and Sewanee to determine champion of the Southern Division. Despite this, there was some discontent within the organization; Secretary Wilders, of Sewanee, opined at length about the decision, describing his distaste about the "secret" nature of the arbitrators. He closed his column by noting that Vanderbilt and Sewanee need not face off in a championship game, as Sewanee had a better record against member teams (2–1 as opposed to 2–2). William Dudley, representative of Vanderbilt, fired back a long retort of his own, accusing Wilders of not understanding the rules of the SIAA's constitution. The game to determine champion of the Southern Division was never played.

A month later sounded the beginning of the end for the first SIAA, when Vanderbilt withdrew from the Association, preceded by Tennessee. Another month later, the SIAA formally folded. Football analysts of the time wrote that the failure was because the association was composed of colleges scattered too far apart. Though the hopes were high that Virginia, North Carolina, and Johns Hopkins would form a new association in September, this appears to have never come to fruition.

=== The SIAA (1894–1942) ===
The SIAA was founded on December 21, 1894, by Dr. William Dudley, a chemistry professor at Vanderbilt, at the Kimball House in Atlanta. Dudley was a member of the Vanderbilt Athletic Association, formed in 1886 with Dr. W. M. Baskerville as president. Most students at Vanderbilt were members. The early sports played on the Vanderbilt campus were baseball, bicycling, and track and field events. Dudley was primarily responsible for the formation of the Southern Intercollegiate Athletic Association. The first advance in the direction of its formation was in March 1888 when the Vanderbilt Athletic Association endeavored to secure track and field meets at Vanderbilt from Southwestern Presbyterian University, Sewanee, and Tennessee. Sewanee's opposition stopped it from occurring.

The original members were Alabama, Auburn, Georgia, Johns Hopkins, North Carolina, Sewanee, Vanderbilt, and Virginia. Virginia and North Carolina soon dropped out, even before the inaugural 1895 season.

Central (Eastern Kentucky), Clemson, Cumberland, Kentucky, LSU, Mercer, Mississippi A&M (Mississippi State), Southwestern Presbyterian University, Texas, Tulane, and the University of Nashville joined the following year in 1895 as invited charter members. The conference was originally formed for "the development and purification of college athletics throughout the South". They crafted a constitution, created an executive committee, elected officers, and set rules for:

- annual conventions
- officiating
- limiting players to five years of eligibility
- banning professional athletes
- requiring athletes to attend the school they represent
- banning instructors and professors from playing
- suspensions of individuals and schools
- expenses

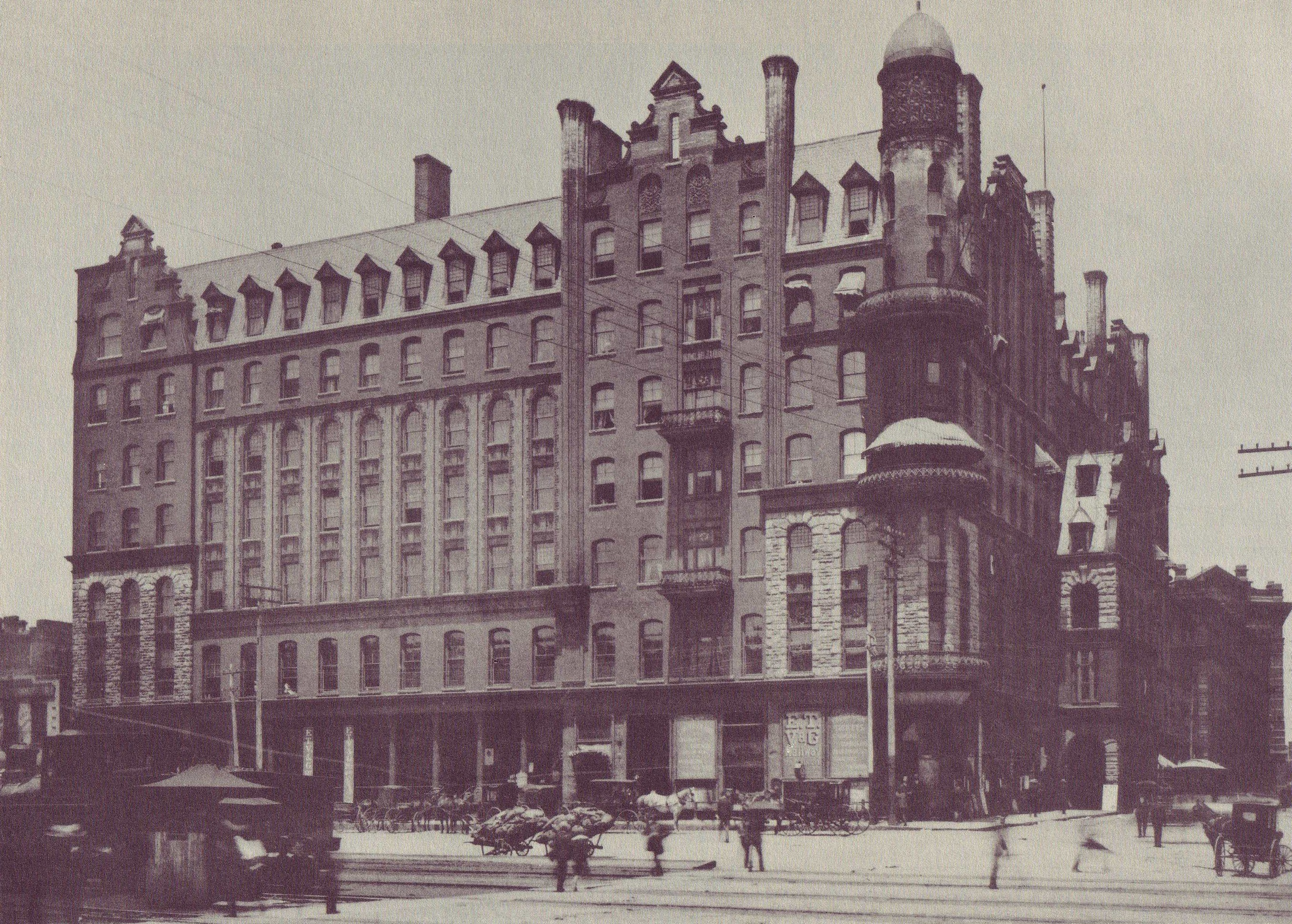
Kimball House

The league did not, however, sponsor much in the way of championship competition for its member schools. It did hold an annual track and field competition for a trophy, and it also held some basketball tournaments over the years, but apparently some member schools did not compete in the tournament during some years, and sometimes non-member southern schools were even allowed to compete in it as well. In 1903, a single-game football playoff occurred, but it seems to have been coordinated more so by the two competing schools (Clemson and Cumberland) than the conference itself. Several other efforts over the years by individual schools (rather than by the SIAA) to hold a conference title game fell through. Most SIAA titles claimed by schools in various sports were actually more mythical in nature than officially sanctioned by the league. Indeed, some schools centrally located in the conference played far more conference games than others on the periphery, making it difficult to form a fair comparison to determine just which team was truly the best, especially once the league began to constantly expand its membership.

In 1915, a disagreement arose within the conference regarding the eligibility of freshman athletes, the so-called "one-year rule." Generally, the larger universities opposed the eligibility of freshman players, while the smaller schools favored it. As a result, some of the large universities formed the Southern Intercollegiate Conference (now the Southern Conference), which used the one-year rule, while still maintaining membership within the SIAA.

At the conference's annual meeting on December 10, 1920, the SIAA rejected proposals to ban freshman athletes and abolish paid summer baseball. In protest, some schools that had voted in favor of the propositions immediately announced they would seek to form a new conference. On February 25, 1921, Alabama, Auburn, Clemson, Georgia, Georgia Tech, Kentucky, Mississippi State, and Tennessee left the SIAA to form the Southern Conference, along with non-SIAA members Maryland, North Carolina, North Carolina State, Virginia, Virginia Tech, and Washington and Lee. In 1922, the Southern Conference underwent an expansion and added six more members, all at the expense of the SIAA: Florida, Louisiana State, Mississippi, South Carolina, Tulane, and Vanderbilt.

With the departure of most of the major colleges, the SIAA became a de facto small college conference in 1923. In the 1920s and 1930s, the SIAA increased its membership with the addition of many additional small universities. The conference eventually disbanded in 1942 with the onset of American involvement in World War II. League archives were kept at Vanderbilt, the league's founding school, but the building housing the archives was eventually gutted with fire, taking countless irreplaceable items pertaining to the SIAA's history with it.

In 1947 there was an attempt, led by Western Kentucky, to revive the SIAA. Western Kentucky hosted an SIAA basketball tournament that turned out to be little more than an invitational tournament because former SIAA members declined to participate.

== Membership list ==
Original charter members from the 1894 SIAA are denoted in boldface; this list is the same as the members from the 1892–1893 SIAA with the replacement of Wake Forest, Tennessee, and St. John's from the 1892 league with Auburn and Georgia. Invited charter members are denoted with an asterisk. In the era in which the SIAA operated, teams tended to join in December; therefore, the first year of conference play in a given sport was often the following calendar year.

Conference affiliations reflect those for the 2016–17 school year.

School	City	State	Tenure	Conference left for	Current conference
**Alabama**	Tuscaloosa	Alabama	1892–1893, 1895–1917, 1919–1921	Southern Conference	Southeastern Conference
**Auburn**	Auburn	Alabama	1895–1921	Southern Conference	Southeastern Conference
Centenary	Shreveport	Louisiana	1925–1941		Southern Collegiate Athletic Conference (NCAA Division III)
Central University of Kentucky	Richmond	Kentucky	1896–1897, 1899–1900		Merged with Centre College in 1901
Centre	Danville	Kentucky	1910–1917, 1919–1941		Southern Athletic Association (NCAA Division III)
Chattanooga	Chattanooga	Tennessee	1914–1916, 1919–1932	Dixie Conference	Southern Conference
The Citadel	Charleston	South Carolina	1908–1935	Southern Conference	Southern Conference
Clemson	Clemson	South Carolina	1896–1921	Southern Conference	Atlantic Coast Conference
Cumberland*	Lebanon	Tennessee	1896–1907, 1909		Mid-South Conference (NAIA)
Delta State	Cleveland	Mississippi	1936–1941		Gulf South Conference (NCAA Division II)
Emory & Henry	Emory	Virginia	1936–1941		South Atlantic Conference (NCAA Division II)
Erskine	Due West	South Carolina	1925–1941		Conference Carolinas (Gulf South Conference for football) (NCAA Division II)
Florida	Gainesville	Florida	1912–1917, 1919–1921	Southern Conference	Southeastern Conference
Furman	Greenville	South Carolina	1902–1904, 1906–1910, 1914–1929, 1932–1935	Southern Conference	Southern Conference
Georgetown (Kentucky)	Georgetown	Kentucky	1915–1916, 1919–1941		Mid-South Conference (NAIA)
**Georgia**	Athens	Georgia	1895–1916, 1919–1921	Southern Conference	Southeastern Conference
Georgia Tech	Atlanta	Georgia	1897–1900, 1902–1913, 1916–1921	Southern Conference	Atlantic Coast Conference
Howard College (Samford)	Homewood	Alabama	1907–1912, 1914–1917, 1919–1931	Dixie Conference	Southern Conference
Jacksonville State	Jacksonville	Alabama	1939–1940		Conference USA
**Johns Hopkins**		Maryland	1892–1893, Part of 1894		Centennial Conference (NCAA Division III)
Kentucky*	Lexington	Kentucky	1896–1904, 1911–1916, 1919–1921	Southern Conference	Southeastern Conference
Kentucky Wesleyan	Owensboro	Kentucky	1925–1930		Great Midwest Athletic Conference (NCAA Division II)
Louisiana Christian	Pineville	Louisiana	1922–1941		Red River Athletic Conference (Sooner Athletic Conference for football) (NAIA)
Louisiana State*	Baton Rouge	Louisiana	1896–1917, 1919–1921	Southern Conference	Southeastern Conference
Louisiana Tech	Ruston	Louisiana	1925–1942	Louisiana Intercollegiate Conference	Conference USA (Sun Belt in 2026)
Louisville	Louisville	Kentucky	1914–1941		Atlantic Coast Conference
Loyola University New Orleans	New Orleans	Louisiana	1925, 1930–1937		Southern States Athletic Conference (NAIA)
Memphis State (Memphis)	Memphis	Tennessee	1935–1942	Independent	American Athletic Conference
Mercer*	Macon	Georgia	1896–1937		Southern Conference
Miami (Florida)	Coral Gables	Florida	1929–1942	Independent	Atlantic Coast Conference
Middle Tennessee	Murfreesboro	Tennessee	1931–1942		Conference USA
Millsaps	Jackson	Mississippi	1908–1909, 1913–1938		Southern Athletic Association (NCAA Division III)
Mississippi	Oxford	Mississippi	1898–1921	Southern Conference	Southeastern Conference
Mississippi College	Clinton	Mississippi	1910–1917, 1919–1941		Gulf South Conference (NCAA Division II)
Mississippi A&M* (Mississippi State)	Starkville	Mississippi	1896–1921	Southern Conference	Southeastern Conference
Morehead State	Morehead	Kentucky	1934–1942		Ohio Valley Conference (Pioneer Football League for football)
Murray State	Murray	Kentucky	1931–1942		Missouri Valley Conference (Missouri Valley Football Conference for football)
Nashville*	Nashville	Tennessee	1896–1900, 1902–1908		University closed in 1909
Newberry	Newberry	South Carolina	1922–1942		South Atlantic Conference (NCAA Division II)
**North Carolina**	Chapel Hill	North Carolina	1892–1893, Part of 1894, 1899–1902	South Atlantic Intercollegiate Athletic Association	Atlantic Coast Conference
Northwestern State	Natchitoches	Louisiana	1928–1941		Southland Conference
Oglethorpe	Atlanta	Georgia	1919–1929, 1937–1941		Southern Athletic Association (NCAA Division III)
Presbyterian	Clinton	South Carolina	1921–1942		Big South Conference (Pioneer Football League for football)
Rollins	Winter Park	Florida	1925–1942		Sunshine State Conference (NCAA Division II)
St. John's (of Maryland)	Annapolis	Maryland	1892–1893		
**University of the South** (Sewanee)	Sewanee	Tennessee	1892–1893, 1895–1900, 1902–1924	Southern Conference	Southern Athletic Association (NCAA Division III)
South Carolina	Columbia	South Carolina	1915–1921	Southern Conference	Southeastern Conference
Southern (Florida)	Lakeland	Florida	1925–1930		Sunshine State Conference (NCAA Division II)
Southern Mississippi	Hattiesburg	Mississippi	1928–1941		Sun Belt Conference
Southern University (Birmingham-Southern)	Birmingham	Alabama	1901–1912; 1930–1931	Dixie Conference	College closed in 2024
Southwestern Presbyterian* (Rhodes)	Memphis	Tennessee	1896–1900, 1902–1903		Southern Athletic Association (NCAA Division III)
Southwestern Louisiana (Louisiana–Lafayette)	Lafayette	Louisiana	1925–1942		Sun Belt Conference
Spring Hill	Mobile	Alabama	1927–1931	Dixie Conference	Southern Intercollegiate Athletic Conference (NCAA Division II)
Stetson	DeLand	Florida	1925–1931, 1933–1940		ASUN Conference (Pioneer Football League for football)
Tampa	Tampa	Florida	1936–1942		Sunshine State Conference (NCAA Division II)
Tennessee	Knoxville	Tennessee	1892–1893, 1897–1916, 1919–1921	Southern Conference	Southeastern Conference
Tennessee Tech	Cookeville	Tennessee	1933–1942	Independent	Ohio Valley Conference (Southern Conference in 2026)
Texas*	Austin	Texas	1896–1903	Southwest Intercollegiate Athletic Conference	Southeastern Conference
Texas A&M	College Station	Texas	1903–1908, 1912–1914	Southwest Intercollegiate Athletic Conference	Southeastern Conference
Transylvania	Lexington	Kentucky	1914–1916, 1919–1924, 1926–1941		Heartland Collegiate Athletic Conference (NCAA Division III)
Trinity College (Duke)	Durham	North Carolina	1903–1912		Atlantic Coast Conference
Troy State (Troy)	Troy	Alabama	1936–1942	no team (WWII)	Sun Belt Conference
Tulane*	New Orleans	Louisiana	1896–1906, 1911–1917, 1919–1921	Southern Conference	American Athletic Conference
Union (Kentucky)	Barbourville	Kentucky	1933–1941		Appalachian Athletic Conference (NAIA)
Union (Tennessee)	Jackson	Tennessee	1925–1942		Gulf South Conference (NCAA Division II)
**Vanderbilt**	Nashville	Tennessee	1892–1893, 1895–1924	Southern Conference	Southeastern Conference
**Virginia**	Charlottesville	Virginia	1892–1893, Part of 1894		Atlantic Coast Conference
Wake Forest	Winston-Salem	North Carolina	1892–1893		Atlantic Coast Conference
Western Kentucky	Bowling Green	Kentucky	1926–1942		Conference USA
Wofford	Spartanburg	South Carolina	1903–1942		Southern Conference

== Conference champions ==
- List of SIAA football champions
- List of SIAA basketball champions
- List of SIAA baseball champions
