= 1920 Georgia Tech Golden Tornado football team =

American college football season

1920 Georgia Tech Golden Tornado football
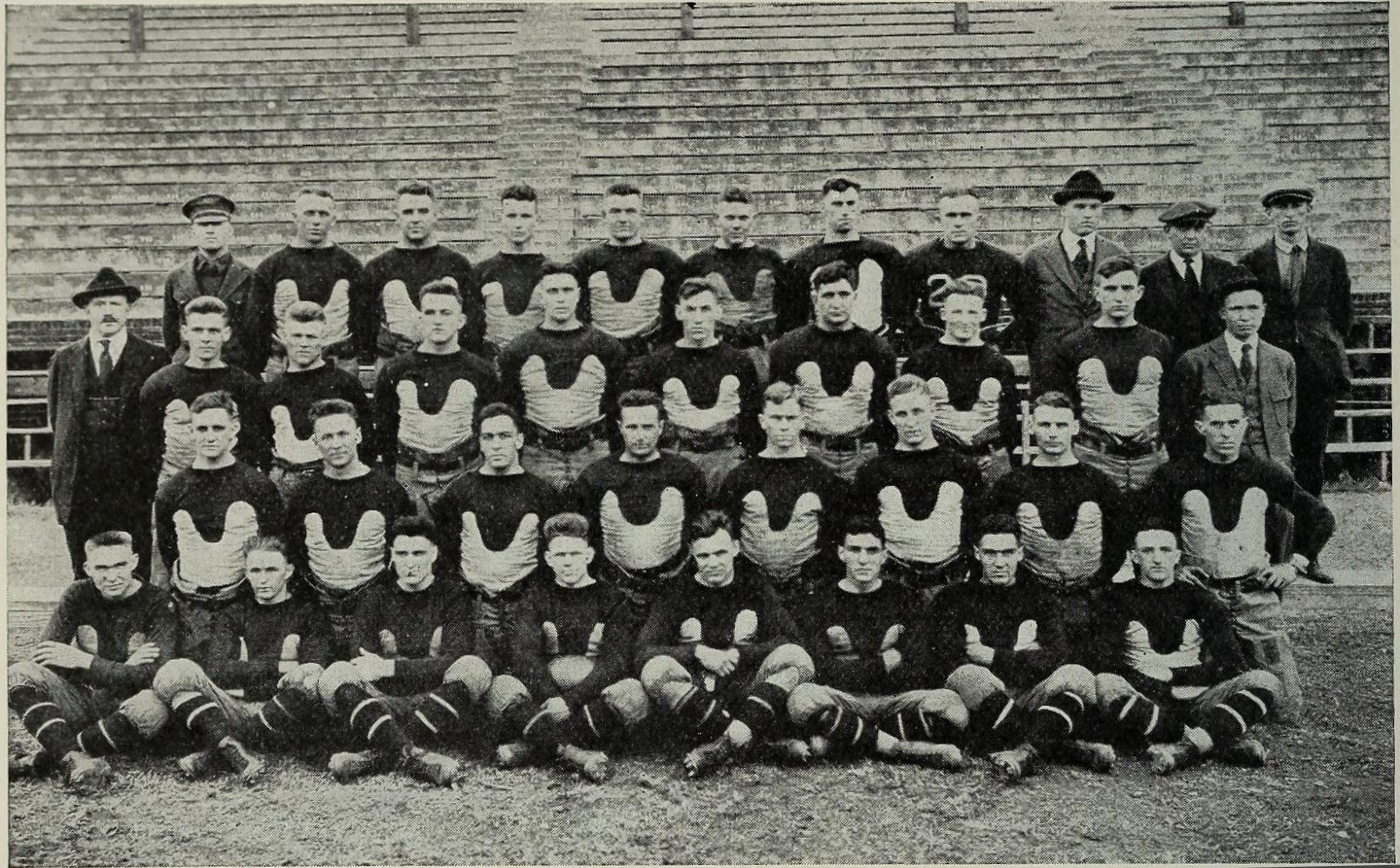
- Conference: Southern Intercollegiate Athletic Association
- Record: 8–1 (4–0 SIAA)
- Head coach: William Alexander (1st season)
- Offensive scheme: Jump shift
- Captain: Buck Flowers
- Home stadium: Grant Field

Uniform
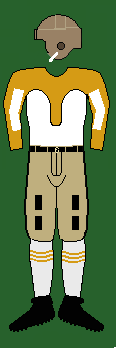

1920 Southern Intercollegiate Athletic Association football standings
	Conf.					Overall
Team	W		L		T	W		L		T
Georgia +	7	–	0	–	0	8	–	0	–	1
Tulane +	5	–	0	–	0	6	–	2	–	1
Georgia Tech +	4	–	0	–	0	8	–	1	–	0
Alabama	6	–	1	–	0	10	–	1	–	0
Centre	4	–	1	–	0	8	–	2	–	0
Furman	3	–	1	–	0	9	–	1	–	0
South Carolina	3	–	1	–	0	5	–	4	–	0
Tennessee	5	–	2	–	0	7	–	2	–	0
Auburn	4	–	2	–	0	7	–	2	–	0
Mississippi A&M	4	–	2	–	0	5	–	3	–	0
Sewanee	3	–	3	–	1	4	–	3	–	1
Vanderbilt	3	–	3	–	0	4	–	3	–	1
Transylvania	2	–	2	–	0	3	–	4	–	0
Howard (AL)	2	–	3	–	0	3	–	5	–	1
Mississippi College	2	–	4	–	0	3	–	5	–	0
Florida	1	–	2	–	0	6	–	3	–	0
Clemson	2	–	6	–	0	4	–	6	–	1
LSU	1	–	3	–	0	5	–	3	–	1
Chattanooga	1	–	3	–	0	3	–	4	–	1
The Citadel	1	–	4	–	0	2	–	6	–	0
Ole Miss	0	–	2	–	0	4	–	3	–	0
Kentucky	0	–	3	–	1	3	–	4	–	1
Georgetown (KY)	0	–	2	–	0	0	–	3	–	0
Millsaps	0	–	3	–	0	0	–	3	–	0
Mercer	0	–	4	–	0	2	–	6	–	0
Wofford	0	–	4	–	0	0	–	8	–	1
+ – Conference co-champions

The 1920 Georgia Tech Golden Tornado football team (Note: Although Georgia Tech's teams are officially known as the "Yellow Jackets", northern writers called the team the "Golden Tornado" in 1917; the name was commonly used until 1928, and for many years afterwards, as an alternate nickname. It may have been coined by Morgan Blake.) represented the Georgia Tech Golden Tornado of the Georgia Institute of Technology during the 1920 Southern Intercollegiate Athletic Association football season. The Tornado was coached by William Alexander in his first year as head coach. The team compiled a record of 8–1 (4–0 SIAA), outscored opponents 312 to 16, and tied for first place with Georgia and Tulane in the Southern Intercollegiate Athletic Association (SIAA).

Georgia Tech played its home games at Grant Field. Its only loss was a controversial one to Pop Warner's Pittsburgh Panthers at Forbes Field. Florent Gibson of the Pittsburgh Post rated Tech as the best team in the country. Tech also handed Centre College its first loss to a southern team since 1916.

Several players received postseason honors. Tackle Bill Fincher made Walter Camp's first-team All-American, then just the fourth Southern player to do so. Captain and senior halfback Buck Flowers made some third-team All-America selections, and led the country with an average of 49.4 yards per punt.

== Before the season ==
After last season, former coach John Heisman resigned and left Atlanta. (Note: It was ostensibly to prevent any social embarrassment to his former wife after their divorce, who chose to remain in the city.) New head coach William Alexander retained Heisman's scheme, using the pre-snap movement of his "jump shift" offense. One report reads: "Since Coach Alex has taken charge there is a change in the team. The youngest coach in major football, he is probably the most popular, and bids fair to prove himself the peer of them all. Not only is Coach the idol of members of the team, but of the student body as well." Former Tech running back and Chippewa Indian Joe Guyon assisted Alexander.

In 1920, football used a one-platoon system in which players played both offense, defense, and special teams. The team's most prominent players were in the backfield, including senior captain and halfback Buck Flowers, a small back who also handled drop kicks and punting. As a safety on defense, no player ever got past him for a touchdown. Halfback Red Barron running behind fullback Judy Harlan was also renowned for its power. (Note: Future Tech fullback Sam Murray was asked about a certain strong runner in the 1930s, "He's good. But if I were playing again, I would have one wish – never to see bearing down upon me a more fearsome picture of power than Judy Harlan blocking for Red Barron.") Most prominent in the line was tackle Bill Fincher, who also was the team's placekicker. Fincher had a glass eye which he would covertly pull out after feigning an injury, turn to his opponents and say: "So that's how you want to play!"

== Schedule ==
Date	Time	Opponent	Site	Result	Attendance
September 25		Wake Forest*	Grant Field; Atlanta, GA	W 44–0	
October 2		Oglethorpe*	Grant Field; Atlanta, GA	W 55–0	6,000
October 9		Davidson*	Grant Field; Atlanta, GA	W 66–0	
October 16		at Vanderbilt	Dudley Field; Nashville, TN (rivalry)	W 44–0	
October 23		at Pittsburgh*	Forbes Field; Pittsburgh, PA	L 3-10	37,000
October 30		Centre*	Grant Field; Atlanta, GA	W 24–0	15,000
November 6		Clemson	Grant Field; Atlanta, GA (rivalry)	W 7–0	
November 13		Georgetown	Grant Field; Atlanta, GA	W 35–6	
November 25	2:00 p.m.	Auburn	Grant Field; Atlanta, GA (rivalry)	W 34–0	20,000
*Non-conference game

== Game summaries ==
=== Week 1: Wake Forest ===
The first game of the year saw Georgia Tech pitted against the Wake Forest Demon Deacons. Tech won 44 to 0. Judy Harlan scored the year's first touchdown. Wake Forest failed to net a single first down. Harlan and Red Barron scored two touchdowns each and quarterbacks Jack McDonough and Pinkey Hunt one each. Captain Flowers gained consistently, and also drop-kicked a 26-yard field goal.

=== Week 2: Oglethorpe ===
Week 2: Oglethorpe @ Georgia Tech

Team	1	2	3	4	Total
Oglethorpe	0	0	0	0	0
• Ga. Tech	7	14	21	13	55

- Date: October 2
- Location: Grant Field
  Atlanta
- Game attendance: 6,000
- Referee: W. R. Tichenor

In the second week of play, Georgia Tech defeated Jogger Elcock's Oglethorpe Stormy Petrels 55 to 0. Buck Flowers had a 68-yard touchdown run. He got his start on a "criss-cross" play near his own 32-yard line, and ran for the touchdown crossing the field laterally many times showing an assortment of moves.

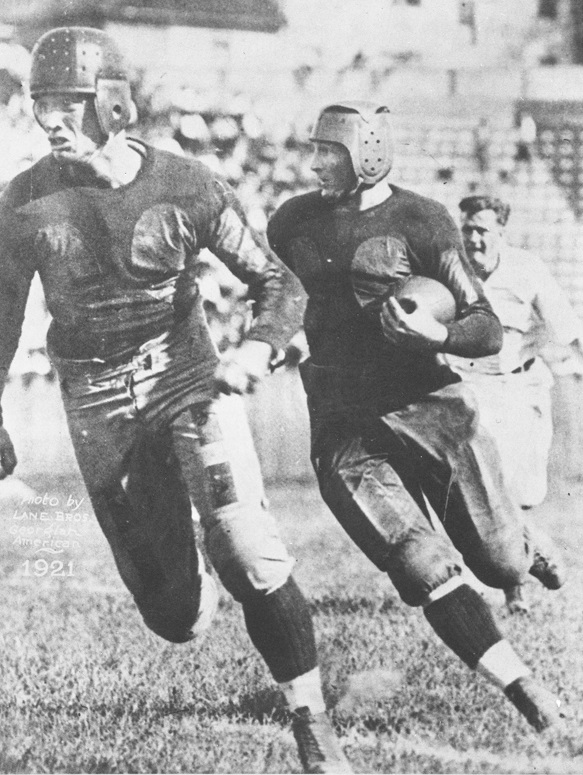
Harlan running interference for Barron.

The starting lineup was: J. Staton (left end), Fincher (left tackle), Lebey (left guard), Amis (center), O. Davis (right guard), A. Staton (right tackle), Ratterman (right end), McDonough (quarterback), Flowers (left halfback), Barron (right halfback), Harlan (fullback)

=== Week 3: Davidson ===
Week 3: Davidson @ Georgia Tech

Team	1	2	3	4	Total
Davidson	0	0	0	0	0
• Ga. Tech	7	28	28	3	66

- Date: October 9
- Location: Grant Field
  Atlanta
- Referee: Stricker Coles

On October 9, Georgia Tech defeated the Davidson Wildcats 66 to 0. Red Barron scored four touchdowns, including an interception return of 76 yards. He also ran in a touchdown from 25 yards out after catching a forward pass from fullback Judy Harlan. Tech attempted six passes the whole game, completing 3 for 114 yards. One of Flowers' punts went 85 yards, the longest in school history.

The starting lineup was: J. Staton (left end), Fincher (left tackle), Lebey (left guard), Amis (center), O. Davis (right guard), A. Staton (right tackle), Ratterman (right end), McDonough (quarterback), Flowers (left halfback), Barron (right halfback), Harlan (fullback)

=== Week 4: at Vanderbilt ===
Week 4: Georgia Tech @ Vanderbilt

Team	1	2	3	4	Total
• Ga. Tech	14	9	7	14	44
Vanderbilt	0	0	0	0	0

- Date: October 16
- Location: Curry Field
  Nashville, Tennessee
- Referee: Ed Finlay

Georgia Tech dominated in a week 4 win over the Vanderbilt Commodores. The 44 to 0 victory was one of the largest at Old Dudley Field. (Note: The worst loss there for Vanderbilt since North Carolina won 48 to 0 in 1900.)

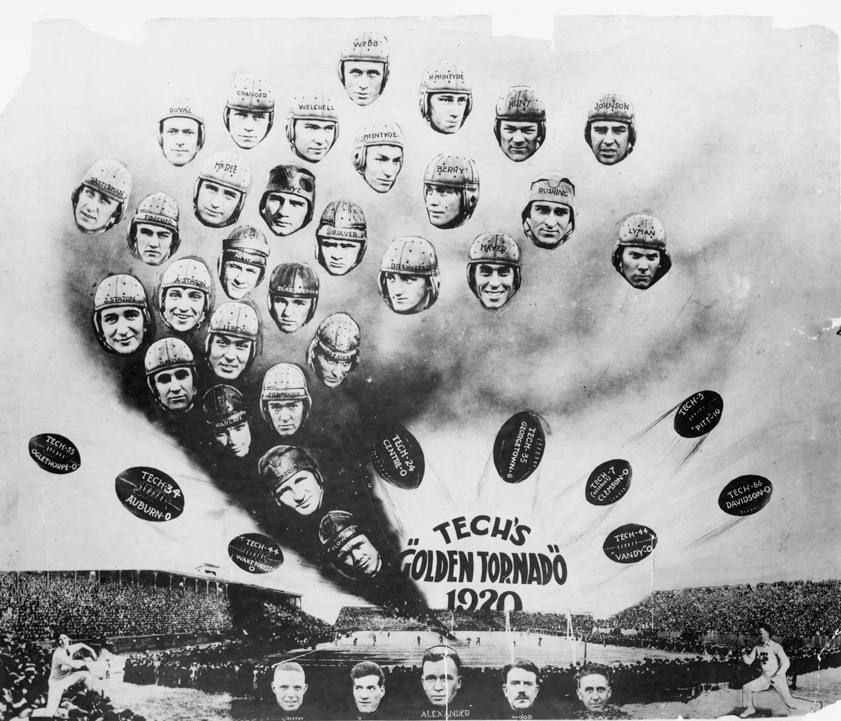
"The Golden Tornado"

Georgia Tech had entered into the main part of its schedule after three dominating wins. Upcoming engagements with Vanderbilt, Pittsburgh, and Centre were said to determine the season's outcome. Pittsburgh and Centre–but Pittsburgh especially, were the biggest opponents. Vanderbilt was seen as the warm up act to these two, for it was far superior to any of Tech's prior games. The first game of the year to have direct implications for the Southern championship, it was cited by some as the most interesting southern contest of the week.

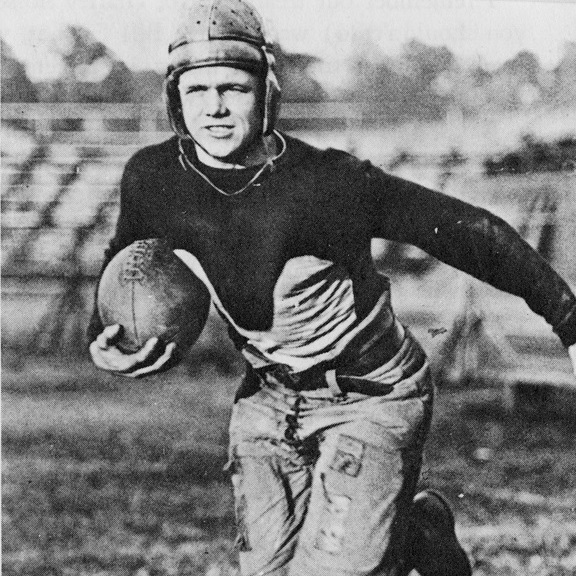
Captain Flowers

The Golden Tornado was the clear favorite. Georgia Tech outplayed Vanderbilt and had the ball for three-fourths of the game. Several of Vanderbilt's players left with injuries. Its ends were easily skirted by the Tech backs Buck Flowers, Red Barron, and Frank Ferst. Tech's first touchdown came when Barron ripped off a 55-yard run. Captain Flowers once made a drop kick from 44 yards out. Ferst came in for Flowers in the middle of the second quarter when Georgia Tech started to use substitutes.

The third quarter saw Vanderbilt's one exciting offensive drive. "With Godchaux, Kuhn, and Raeburn subbing in the backfield, the Commodores opened a series of forward passes and runs that netted about 50 yards before Flowers intercepted a long pass on his own 10-yard line and raced 50 yards before being pushed out of bounds by a Vandy tackler". Fumbles cost Vanderbilt; one by Grailey Berryhill lead to Tech's third touchdown. In the fourth quarter, a fight broke out involving Gink Hendrick, some Tech players, and spectators. (Note: Hendrick claimed to be protecting Jess Neely from some player for Georgia Tech. No ejections could be made since too many players were involved.) Tech lost some 133 yards from penalties during the contest.

The starting lineup was: J. Staton (left end), A. Staton (left tackle), O. Davis (left guard), Amis (center), Lebey (right guard), Fincher (right tackle), Ratterman (right end), McDonough (quarterback), Flowers (left halfback), Barron (right halfback), Harlan (fullback).

=== Week 5: at Pittsburgh ===
Week 5: Georgia Tech @ Pittsburgh

Team	1	2	3	4	Total
Ga. Tech	0	3	0	0	3
• Pitt	0	0	0	10	10

- Date: October 23
- Location: Forbes Field
  Pittsburgh
- Game attendance: 37,000
- Referee: C. J. McCarty (Germantown)

The Golden Tornado suffered its only loss at the hands of Pop Warner's Pittsburgh Panthers at Forbes Field by a score of 10 to 3. The game was controversial and Pitt was considered lucky to have won, such that after the game Pitt's own players and coaches led the praise for Tech. (Note: Tech's shift was penalized for some 165 yards that day.) Tech halfback Red Barron played with a broken jaw suffered during the Vanderbilt game. Coach Warner called Barron the greatest halfback ever to perform on Forbes Field. Pitt fullback Orville "Tiny" Hewitt injured Tech quarterback Jack McDonough's ankle, and Frank Ferst had to take his place for the rest of the season.

In the first quarter, Pitt back Tom Davies was injured. Buck Flowers made the only points of the half with a 20-yard drop-kick. Flowers' performance against Pitt caused Grantland Rice to call him one of the best broken field runners in the country. His tackling on defense also drew praise.

At the beginning of the fourth quarter, Hewitt plunged over for a touchdown. By then Davies had returned and added the extra point. He later also added a 30-yard field goal. Due to concern's over Tech players' eligibility, Pitt refused to schedule another game with Georgia Tech.

The starting lineup was: J. Staton (left end), Fincher (left tackle), Lebey (left guard), Amis (center), O. Davis (right guard), A. Staton (right tackle), Ratterman (right end), McDonough (quarterback), Flowers (left halfback), Barron (right halfback), Harlan (fullback).

=== Week 6: Centre ===
Week 6: Centre @ Georgia Tech

Team	1	2	3	4	Total
Centre	0	0	0	0	0
• Ga. Tech	3	7	7	7	24

- Date: October 30
- Location: Grant Field
  Atlanta
- Game attendance: 15,000+
- Referee: Ed Hamilton

Arguably the highlight of the year was the defeat of the Centre Praying Colonels by a score of 24 to 0. It was Centre's first loss to a southern team since 1916. (Note: Also, both schools had just recently fought against the North. Centre the week before played valiantly against Harvard, a foreshadowing of next year's game.) A story goes that tackle Bill Fincher sought to knock Centre quarterback "Bo" McMillin out of the game, taking with him brass-knuckles or "something equally diabolical." Before the game, Fincher said "You're a great player Bo...I feel awful sorry about it because you are not going to be in there very long—about three minutes."

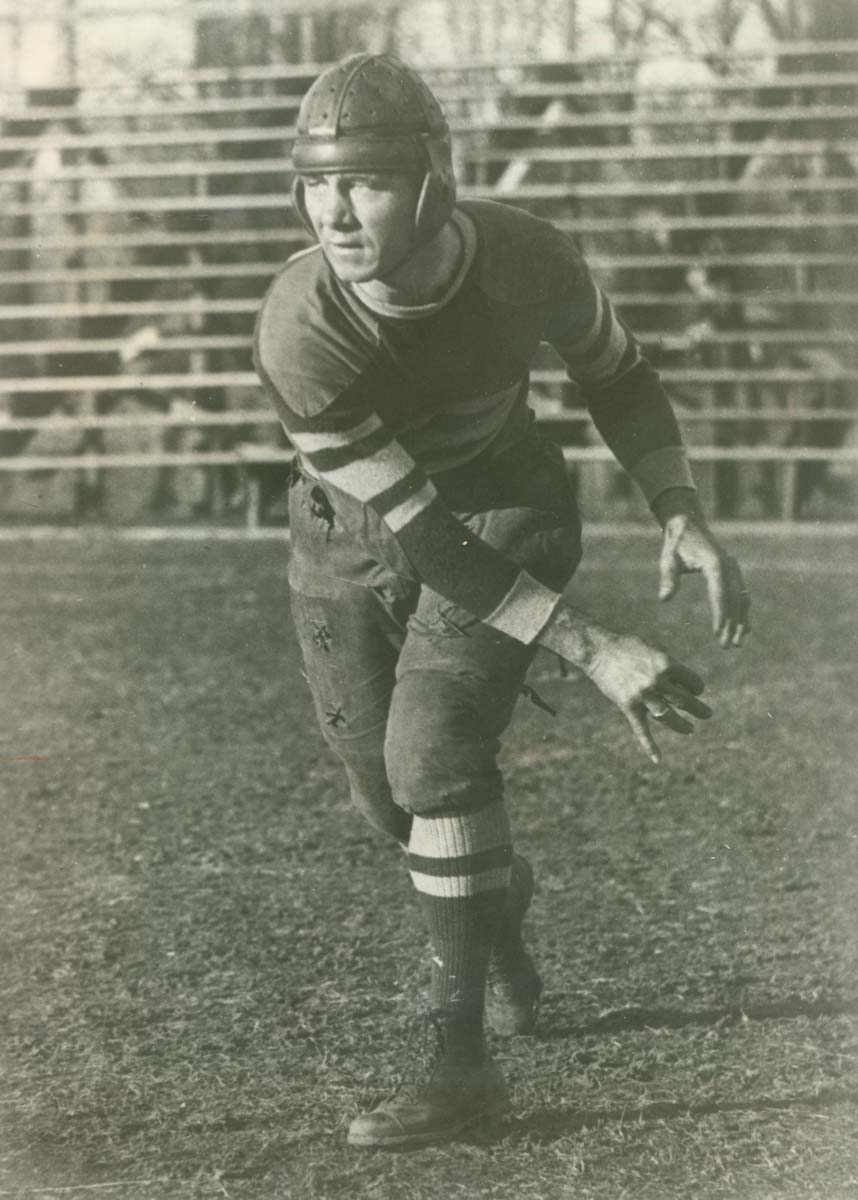
Tech gave Bo McMillin (pictured) his first and only loss to a southern team.

Red Barron starred in the game, including a 57-yard touchdown run: "twisting and dodging through the desperate Centre secondary." In the third quarter, Ferst ran 55 yards for a score.

One writer claimed: "even the great "Bo" McMillin was powerless against the Tech players." The Atlanta Constitution reported: "McMillin's forward passes outdid anything of the kind seen here in many years, but Tech seemed to know where they were going."

The starting lineup was: J. Staton (left end), Fincher (left tackle), Lebey (left guard), Amis (center), O. Davis (right guard), A. Staton (right tackle), Ratterman (right end), Ferst (quarterback), Flowers (left halfback), Barron (right halfback), Harlan (fullback).

=== Week 7: Clemson ===
Week 7: Clemson @ Georgia Tech

Team	1	2	3	4	Total
Clemson	0	0	0	0	0
• Ga. Tech	0	0	0	7	7

- Date: November 6
- Location: Grant Field
  Atlanta
- Referee: Paul Magoffin

Coach Alexander rested his starters for the game against the Clemson Tigers and played substitutes throughout: "to teach the gamblers and point-makers a lesson." Sub quarterback Pinkey Hunt scored the lone touchdown in the final quarter.

End Georgie Ratterman was under treatment by a stomach specialist as the result of trouble supposedly caused by over-exertion during his confinement in a German prison during World War I. It was not known if he could still play.

The starting lineup was: Mayer (left end), McCree (left tackle), Webb (left guard), Johnson (center), Berry (right guard), Lyman (right tackle), Gringer (right end), Glaver (quarterback), Brewster (left halfback), Scarboro (right halfback), Rushing (fullback)

=== Week 8: Georgetown ===
Week 8: Georgetown @ Georgia Tech

Team	1	2	3	4	Total
Georgetown	0	0	0	6	6
• Ga. Tech	7	0	21	7	35

- Date: November 13
- Location: Grant Field
  Atlanta
- Referee: Mike Thompson

In the eighth week of play, the Golden Tornado faced the Georgetown Blue and Gray coached by former Carlisle great Albert Exendine, and won 35 to 6. Exendine countered claims of Tech running up the score, saying his safety men were not playing their best. "The sportsmanship displayed by the Golden Tornado was all that could be desired", said Exendine. The outstanding feature of the game was Flowers' 80-yard, off-tackle touchdown run, still one of the longest in school history. One of Flowers' punts went 82 yards. Ed Hamilton was umpire.

The starting lineup was: J. Staton (left end), Fincher (left tackle), Lebey (left guard), Amis (center), O. Davis (right guard), Johnson (right tackle), A. Staton (right end), Ferst (quarterback), Flowers (left halfback), Barron (right halfback), Harlan (fullback)

=== Week 9: Auburn ===
Week 9: Auburn @ Georgia Tech

Team	1	2	3	4	Total
Auburn	0	0	0	0	0
• Ga. Tech	0	6	7	21	34

- Date: November 25
- Location: Grant Field
  Atlanta
- Game start: 2:00 p. m.
- Game attendance: 20,000
- Referee: Mike Thompson

On November 25, Georgia Tech defeated the Auburn Tigers at Grant Field by a score of 34 to 0 for a share of the SIAA title. The Tigers had a powerful eleven, which beat Vanderbilt 56 to 6 to counter Tech's 44 to 0 win, and set a school record with 332 points in nine games. Some Auburn fans before the game predicted a victory over Tech and the conference title.

Flowers scored three touchdowns in the game, including punt returns of 82 and 65 yards and a 33-yard run from scrimmage, and also passed for a fourth touchdown. Flowers also kicked a punt that went 65 yards in the air against Auburn. Sportswriter Morgan Blake said about Flowers' play against Auburn: "The Auburn Tiger came up with claws sharpened. As he writhed in death agony when the battle was over, he made one request, 'Please omit Flowers'."

The Atlanta Journal wrote that Flowers was: "flitting like a phantom, an undulating, rippling, chromatic phantom, over the whitewashed lines." The yearbook remarked Bill Fincher: "began his great work on the sand lots of Tech Hi here in Atlanta years ago and ended it up by smearing "Fatty" Warren of the Auburn Tigers all over the flats of Grant Field on Turkey Day last."

The starting lineup was: J. Staton (left end), Fincher (left tackle), Lebey (left guard), Amis (center), Davis (right guard), A. Staton (right tackle), Ratterman (right end), Ferst (quarterback), Flowers (left halfback), Barron (right halfback), Harlan (fullback).

== Postseason ==
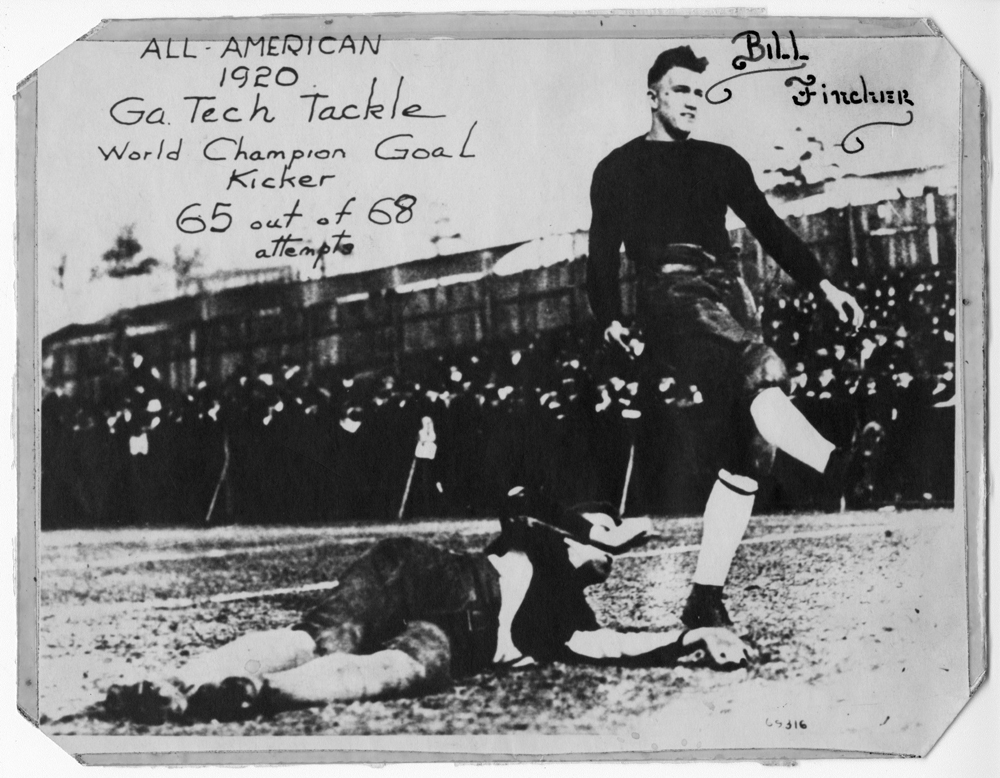
Fincher kicking from placement.

=== Awards and honors ===
Nine of the eleven starters made some writer's All-Southern team. (Note: All except for center Dad Amis and quarterback Jack McDonough.) Bill Fincher was selected first-team All-American by Walter Camp. He was just the fourth southern player to receive this honor. (Note: Fuzzy Woodruff commenting on the All-Southern composite selection of the Atlanta Constitution and Atlanta Journal next season states "This composite pick has now been recognized as the south's official football hall of fame. No southern player can receive a higher honor unless he happens to be named on Walter Camp's All-American.") Fincher made 31 PAT attempts on the year, and closed his career with a record 122 of 136.

Captain Flowers was selected as a third-team All-American by the United Press and the International News Service. Records conflict as to his rushing totals during the 1920 season. According to one account, which acknowledged it was based on incomplete records, Flowers rushed 80 times for 819 yards (10.2 yards per carry), and had 290 punt return yards (16.5 yards per return), in six games. According to another account, published by the United Press in 1958, Flowers rushed for 1,425 yards in 1920. He also led the country with an average of 49.4 yards per punt; and had a school record for number of drop kicked field goals. Coach Alexander said Flowers was the best punter Tech ever had and the best back he ever coached, calling him "pound for pound, my greatest player".

=== Championships ===
Rooters on either side of Georgia were happy as both Georgia and Tech claimed SIAA titles. Florent Gibson of the Pittsburgh Post rated Tech as the best team in the country.

== Personnel ==
=== Depth chart ===
The following chart provides a visual depiction of Tech's lineup during the 1920 season with games started at the position reflected in parentheses. The chart mimics the offense after the jump shift has taken place.

LE
John Staton (7)
R. P. Mayer (1)

LT	LG	C	RG	RT
Bill Fincher (6)	Dummy Lebey (6)	Dad Amis (7)	Oscar Davis (6)	Albert Staton (5)
J. P. McCrea (1)	Oscar Davis (1)	Charles Johnson (1)	W. G. Berry (1)	Charles Johnson (1)
Albert Staton (1)	B. P. Webb (1)	Claire Frye (0)	Dummy Lebey (1)	W. P. Lyman (1)
Jesse Fincher (0)				Bill Fincher (1)

RE
Georgie Ratterman (6)
H. W. Granger (1)
Albert Staton (1)

QB
Jack McDonough (4)
Frank Ferst (3)
Bill Glaver (1)
Pinkey Hunt (0)

RHB
Red Barron (7)
Dewey Scarboro (1)

FB
Judy Harlan (7)
O. W. Rushing (1)
H. Welchel (0)

LHB
Buck Flowers (7)
Jimmy Brewster (1)
Oats (0)

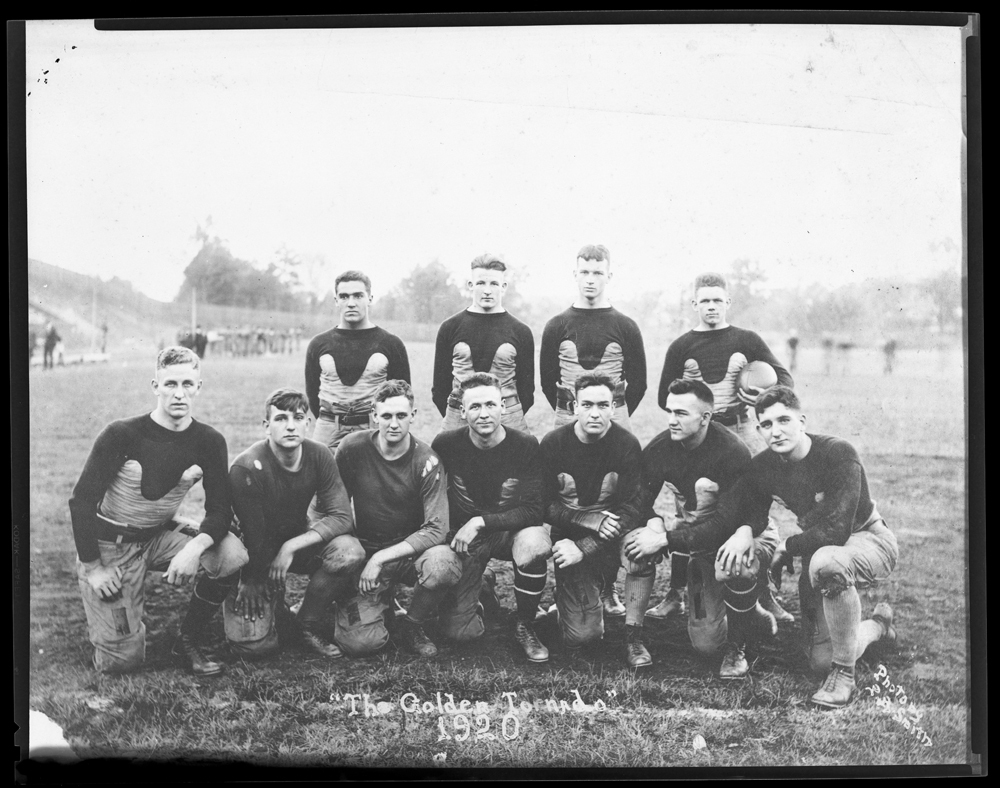
Starters

=== Starters ===
==== Line ====
Player	Position	Games started	Hometown	Prep school	Height	Weight	Age
John Staton	End	7	Atlanta				18
Bill Fincher	Tackle, End	7	Spring Place, Georgia	Tech High School	6'0"	188	20
Dummy Lebey	Guard	7	Savannah, Georgia				
Dad Amis	Center	7					25
Oscar Davis	Guard	7				182	
Al Staton	Tackle	7	Atlanta, Georgia	Boys High School		182	20
Georgie Ratterman	End	6	Nashville, Tennessee	Spring Hill College			22

==== Backfield ====
Player	Position	Games started	Hometown	Prep school	Height	Weight	Age
Jack McDonough	Quarterback	6	Savannah, Georgia				
Buck Flowers	Halfback	8	Sumter, South Carolina	Sumter High School	5'7"	155	21
Red Barron	Halfback	8	Clarkesville, Georgia		5'11"	180	20
Judy Harlan	Fullback	8	Ottumwa, Iowa	Tech High School	5'11"	178	23

=== Substitutes ===
==== Line ====
Player	Position	Games started	Hometown	Prep school	Height	Weight	Age
W. G. Berry	Guard	1					
Jesse Fincher	Tackle						
Claire Frye	Center		Oklahoma City, Oklahoma			160	
H. W. Granger	End	1					
Charles Johnson	Center	1	Atlanta, Georgia		6'0"	184	23
W. P. Lyman	Tackle	1					
R. P. Mayer	End	1					
J. P. McCrea	Tackle	1					
B. P. Webb	Guard	1					

==== Backfield ====
Player	Position	Games started	Hometown	Prep school	Height	Weight	Age
Jimmy Brewster	Halfback	1	Newnan, Georgia		5'7"	155	18
Frank Ferst	Quarterback	2					
Bill Glaver	Quarterback	1					
Pinkey Hunt	Quarterback						
Oats	Halfback						
O. W. Rushing	Fullback	1					
Dewey Scarboro	Halfback	1	Moultrie, Georgia	Moultrie High School	5'6"	145	21
H. Welchel	Fullback						

=== Scoring leaders ===
The following is an incomplete list of statistics and scores, largely dependent on newspaper summaries.

Player	Touchdowns	Extra points	Field goals	Points
Judy Harlan	12	0	0	72
Buck Flowers	8	2	4	62
Red Barron	10	0	0	60
Bill Fincher	0	31	0	31
Jack McDonough	5	0	0	30
Frank Ferst	2	0	0	12
Pinkey Hunt	2	0	0	12
Bill Glaver	1	0	0	6
Kenyon	1	0	0	6
Dummy Lebey	1	0	0	6
Patterman	1	0	0	6
W. P. Lyman	0	3	0	3
Dewey Scarboro	0	0	1	3
Al Staton	0	3	0	3
Total	43	39	5	312

=== Coaching staff ===
- Head coach: William Alexander
- Backfield coach: Joe Guyon
- Line coach: Fay Wood
- Reserve coach: Kid Clay
- Freshman coach: George C. Griffin
- Manager: F. L. Asbury Jr.

== See also ==
- 1920 Southern Intercollegiate Athletic Association football season
- 1920 College Football All-Southern Team
- 1920 College Football All-America Team
