= 1920 Pittsburgh Panthers football team =

American college football season

1920 Pittsburgh Panthers football
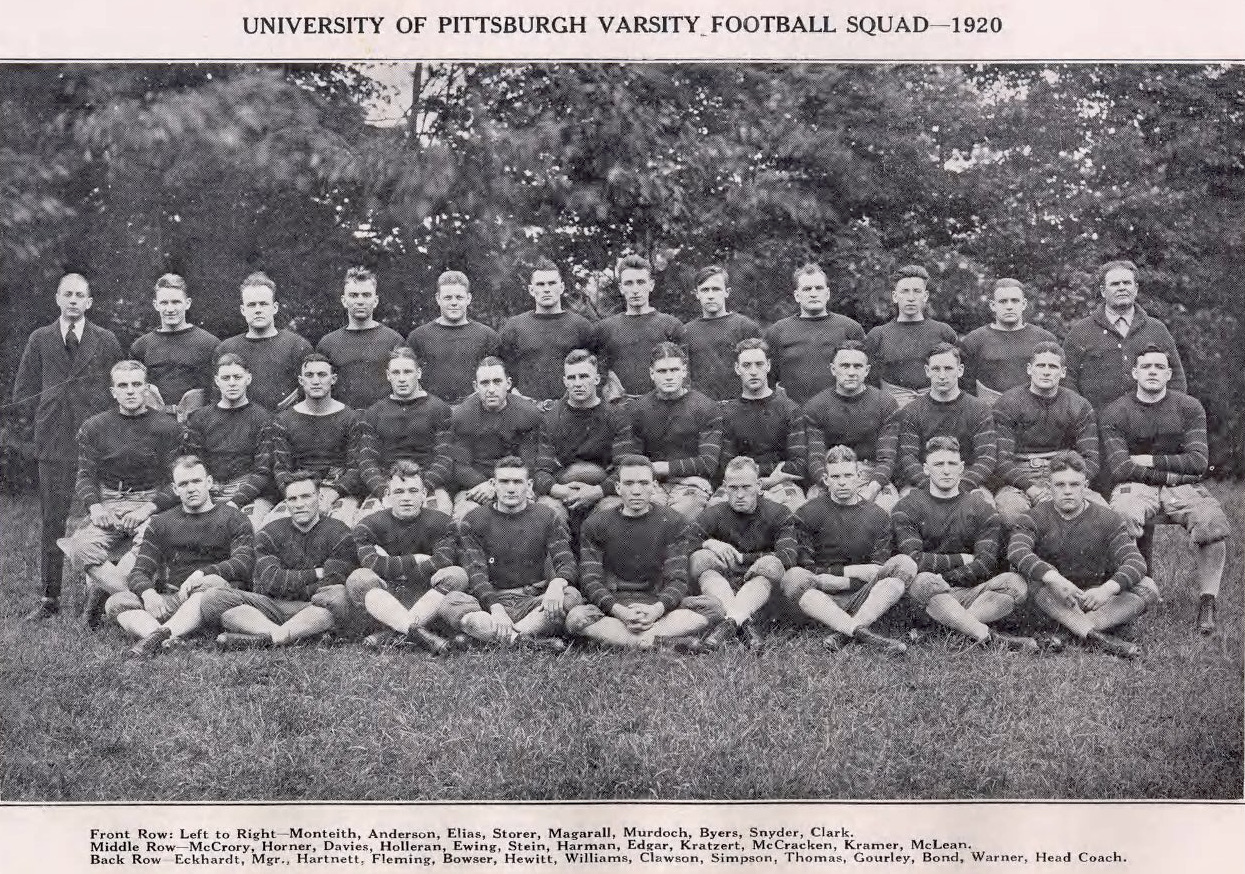
- Conference: Independent
- Record: 6–0–2
- Head coach: Pop Warner (6th season)
- Offensive scheme: Double wing
- Captain: Herb Stein
- Home stadium: Forbes Field

1920 Eastern college football independents records
	Conf.			Overall
Team	W	L	T	W		L		T
Boston College		–		8	–	0	–	0
Harvard		–		8	–	0	–	1
Princeton		–		6	–	0	–	1
Penn State		–		7	–	0	–	2
Pittsburgh		–		6	–	0	–	2
Army		–		7	–	2	–	0
Dartmouth		–		7	–	2	–	0
Cornell		–		6	–	2	–	0
Syracuse		–		6	–	2	–	1
Geneva		–		5	–	2	–	1
New Hampshire		–		5	–	2	–	1
Brown		–		6	–	3	–	0
Bucknell		–		6	–	3	–	0
Washington & Jefferson		–		6	–	3	–	1
Penn		–		6	–	4	–	0
Carnegie Tech		–		5	–	3	–	0
Lafayette		–		5	–	3	–	0
Holy Cross		–		5	–	3	–	0
Williams		–		5	–	3	–	0
Yale		–		5	–	3	–	0
Fordham		–		4	–	3	–	0
Franklin & Marshall		–		3	–	2	–	2
Boston University		–		4	–	3	–	1
Columbia		–		4	–	4	–	0
Duquesne		–		3	–	3	–	1
Vermont		–		3	–	5	–	0
NYU		–		2	–	5	–	1
Rhode Island State		–		0	–	4	–	4
Tufts		–		2	–	6	–	0
Rutgers		–		2	–	7	–	0
Buffalo		–		1	–	4	–	0
Colgate		–		1	–	5	–	2
Villanova		–		1	–	5	–	1
Drexel		–		0	–	6	–	0

The 1920 Pittsburgh Panthers football team was an American football team that represented the University of Pittsburgh as an independent during the 1920 college football season. In its sixth season under head coach Pop Warner, the team compiled a 6–0–2 record and outscored all opponents by a total of 146 to 44. The team played its home games at Forbes Field in Pittsburgh. "Perhaps due to the resurrection of sports after the war period, Pitt enjoyed an athletic year that was quite indicative of its pre-war strength, which so practically dominated college sport activities in this section for many years. The season of 1920-21 boasted of representative Pitt teams in every branch of sport - football, basketball, baseball, track, swimming and tennis. Aviation, which made its initial bow at the University last year, progressed in fine manner – the team having been entered in the big intercollegiate meet.

== Schedule ==
Date	Opponent	Site	Result	Attendance	Source
October 2	at Geneva	Beaver Falls, PA	W 47–0	4,000	
October 9	West Virginia	Forbes Field; Pittsburgh, PA (rivalry)	W 34–13	22,000	
October 16	at Syracuse	Archbold Stadium; Syracuse, NY	T 7–7	15,000	
October 23	Georgia Tech	Forbes Field; Pittsburgh, PA	W 10–3	27,000	
October 30	Lafayette	Forbes Field; Pittsburgh, PA	W 14–0	15,000	
November 6	at Penn	Franklin Field; Philadelphia, PA	W 27–21	25,500	
November 13	Washington & Jefferson	Forbes Field; Pittsburgh, PA	W 7–0	31,500	
November 25	Penn State	Forbes Field; Pittsburgh, PA (rivalry)	T 0–0	32,500	

== Preseason ==
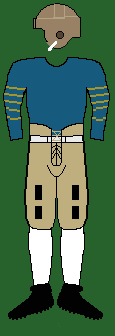
20spittuniform

In spite of the 6–2–1 record of 1919, the outlook for the 1920 campaign was much better for Coach Warner. Twelve of the twenty-two lettermen were still in school and the freshmen team contributed twenty-six lads for possible varsity duty. "The squad next fall will be composed largely of men who went through this year's campaign, either on the varsity or freshmen team. There will be more experience in the Panther outfit next season than there was at anytime this season."

At the annual football banquet Herb Stein, star center, was elected Captain for the 1920 season. A week later Karl E. Davis appointed Robert G. Eckhardt as student football manager for the 1920 season. Mr. Eckhardt was a junior in the School of Economics. His brother was a well-known middle distance runner at Pitt.

On December 11 The Pittsburg Press reported:

The announcement today by the University of Pittsburgh athletic authorities that a decision had been reached to have nothing further to do with Carnegie Tech in a sporting way was hardly unexpected. There has been considerable bitterness between the two schools for a long time, and this was increased greatly on the occasion of the recent football game between the Panther and the Plaid at Forbes Field, at which a riot was precipitated by a Tech students who resented the attempt of Pitt men to lower a Tech flag, which had surreptitiously been raised to the top of the Forbes Field flagstaff. However, the chances are that even this incident would have passed without any official action by Pitt, had not it been for an address delivered by Director Hamerschlag, of Tech, at Meadville, not long ago, in which he cast aspersions upon Pitt's eligibility code, and the amateur standing of the Panther athletes. While there is no mention of this address in Pitt's statement, it is known that it caused a great deal of adverse comment on the part of followers of Pitt, and it doubtless had more to do with the break than anything else.

Karl E. Davis announced the eight game 1920 football schedule on December 22. The schedule mirrored the 1919 slate except Lehigh and Carnegie Tech were absent. Lafayette replaced Tech but there was no replacement found for Lehigh.

On September 7, 1920 Coach Warner and forty Panther football prospects arrived at Camp Hamilton for two and a half weeks of preseason training. Student Manager Eckhardt and his assistants "got everything in shipshape for the coming of Coach Warner and his lads. The foxy mentor has asked that his squad be specially equipped this season in the matter of trousers and shoes, and the Panthers will have something novel in those lines. The men have all been provided with shoes in advance, in order to insure a perfect fit." New additions to the staff were Tom Kendrick, former varsity lineman, who handled first aid, and Dr. "Hube" Wagner (captain of the 1913 team), the medical supervisor. Former players - end Pat Herron, last year's captain Jimmie DeHart, guard Dale Seis and tackle Claude Thornhill - were on hand to assist Coach Warner. Leon W. Kelly, a star on the 1916 freshmen team, returned to school after his stint in the army and was welcomed to Camp Hamilton on September 14. "He scales better than 180 pounds, is aggressive, experienced and 'seasoned,' and is likely to win himself a regular job."

Coach Warner, a man of few words, issued a statement to The Pittsburgh Post:

I only know that we are in for a hard year. Our opponents are certain to be strong. Many of them do not have the one-year residence rule and a student is eligible for the varsity football team as soon as he matriculates. Often such men plug big holes. We can't do that at Pitt. Our only new men are those who come to us from the Freshmen team of the preceding season. I do not know what the outcome of the season will be, but I believe the boys will do as they have always done for me – fight their hardest and do their best. I can't ask for anything more.

Walter Camp and the Rules Committee made one change of note: "Hereafter, if a touchdown is made, whether directly behind the goalposts or at the extreme corner of the field, the side making the touchdown may bring the ball out in front of the goal such distance as it thinks desirable, and from that point make the try for goal."

== Coaching staff ==
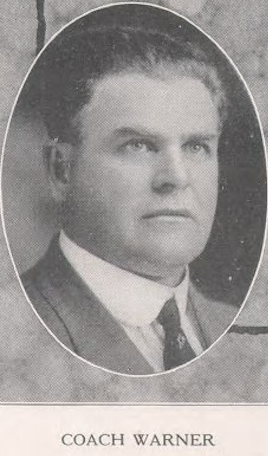
Pop Warner

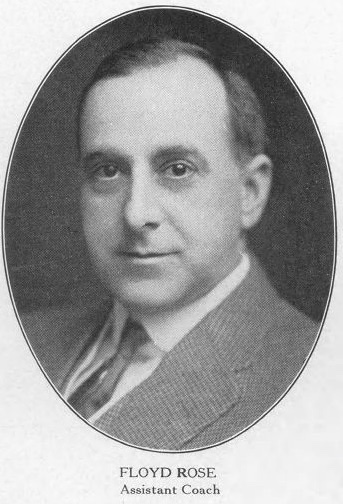
Floyd Rose

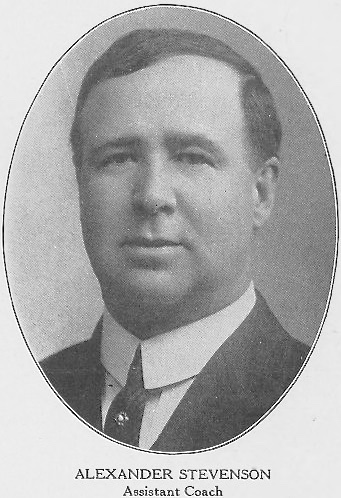
Alexander Stevenson

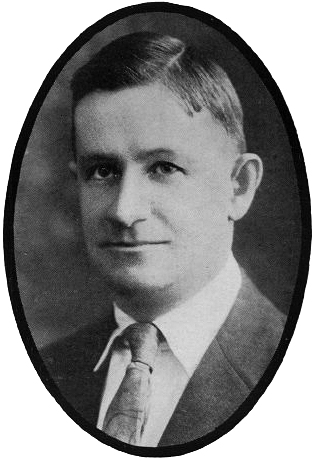
Andrew Kerr

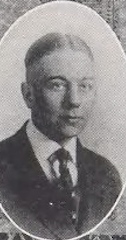
Robert G. Eckhardt

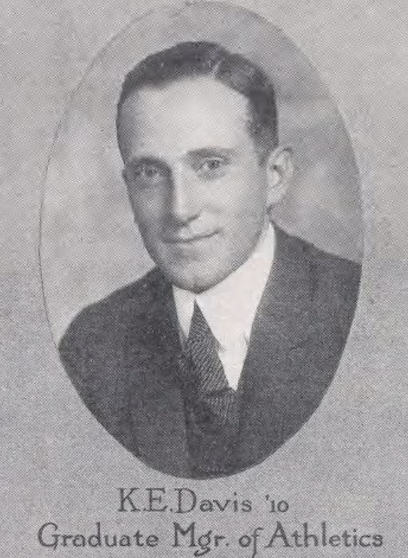
Karl E. Davis

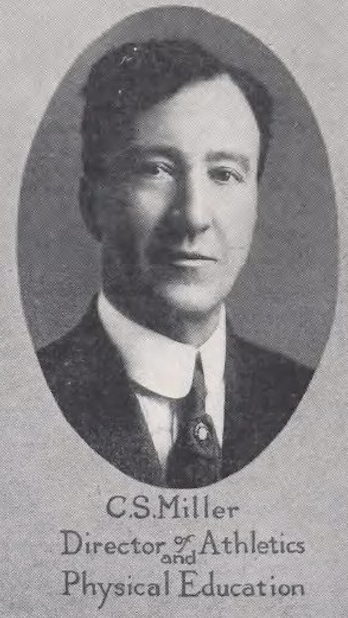
Charles S. Miller

1920 Pittsburgh Panthers football staff
Coaching staff: Pop Warner – Head coach; Floyd Rose – Assistant coach; Alexander Stevenson – Assistant coach; Andrew Kerr – Freshman coach	Support staff: Robert G. Eckhardt – Student football manager; Karl E. Davis – Graduate manager of athletics; Charles S. Miller – Director of athletics

== Roster ==
1920 Pittsburgh Panthers football roster
Player	Position	Games	Height	Weight	Class	Prep school	Degree	Nickname	Age
John Anderson*	halfback	8	5' 9"	170	1923	Ben Avon H. S.	English	Andy	24
James Bond*	guard	8	5' 9"	195	1921	Central H. S.	Pre-Med	Dinty	23
Charles Bowser*	center	7	5' 11"	170	1924	Johnstown H. S.	Economics	Bows	21
Ben Breman	tackle	1	5' 8"	165	1921	Peabody H. S.	Dental School	Bif	22
Franklin E. Byers*	halfback	4	5' 11"	160	1923	Turtle Creek H. S.	Economics	Red	19
John Clark*	guard	4	5' 10"	193	1923	Allegheny H. S.	School of Mines	Clarky	19
Jack Clawson	end	1	6' 1"	170	1923	The Kiski School		Jack	23
Thomas Davies*	halfback	8	5' 8"	150	1922	The Kiski School	Economics	Hop	21
A. Willis Edgar, Jr.*	end	8	6' 2"	177	1924	The Kiski School		Bill	22
Fred Ewing	end	2	5' 9"	170	1922	The Kiski School	Dental School	Freddie	23
W. Cullen Gourley*	tackle	8	5' 10"	190	1922	Punxsutawney H. S.	Economics	Fats	19
Harvey Harman*	tackle	4	6'	200	1922	Peabody H. S.	Economics	Harv	19
Mike Hartnett	halfback	3	5' 11"	160	1923	Johnstown H. S.	Economics	Mike	20
Adolph Herskowitz	tackle	3	5' 11"	164	1921	Wilkinsburg H. S.	Dental School	Add	24
Orville Hewitt*	fullback	7	5' 10"	210	1923	Wilkinsburg H. S.		Orv	22
Tom Holleran*	quarterback	6	5' 7"	165	1923	The Kiski School	Dental School	Googs	22
W. W. Horner	quarterback	1	5' 8"	161	1921	New Castle H. S.	Dental School	Bill	23
Leon Kelly*	tackle	5	5' 10"	180	1922	Mansfield Normal	Economics	Dick	23
William Kramer	end	1	6' 1"	175	1924	Oil City H.S.		Bill	22
Oscar Kratzert	guard	1	5' 11"	190	1921	Woodlawn H.S.	Dental School	Kratz	23
John Laughran	halfback	3	5' 11"	155	1922	Braddock H. S.	Economics	Speedo	22
G. Herbert McCracken*	halfback	8	5' 9"	157	1921	Sewickley H. S.	Economics	Herb	21
John McCrory*	end	8	5' 11"	166	1921	Wilkinsburg H. S.	Dental School	Skyrocket	22
John McLean*	guard	8	5' 11"	188	1923	Homestead H.S.	Dental School	Mac	22
Henry Magarrall	center	3	5' 11"	165	1923	Westinghouse H. S.	Pharmacy	Maggy	21
Louis Markowitz	guard	4	5' 7"	193	1921	McKees Rocks H. S.	Dental School	Marx	21
R. M. Monteith	halfback	1	5' 8"	169	1924	Johnstown H. S.		Monty	21
W. F. Murdoch	halfback	1	5' 8"	160	1924	Peabody H. S.		Frank	22
Jacob B. Sacklowski*(Sack)	tackle	8	6' 2"	190	1923	Fifth Avenue H. S.	Economics	Sack	19
Richard M. Simpson	tackle	3	5' 11"	179	1923	Huntingdon H. S.	College	Dick	20
Herb Stein*	center	8	5' 11"	180	1923	The Kiski School	Bachelor of Science	Herbie	221
Charles Storer	end	1	5' 6"	155	1924	Elizabeth H. S.		Chuck	19
W. J. Thomas*	guard	1	5' 10"	210	1921	Lock Haven Normal	Economics	Dode	24
Frank W. Williams*	end	5	6' 1"	180	1924	The Kiski School	Engineering	Pie	20
Robert G. Eckhardt	manager				1921	Peabody H. S.	Economics		
* Letterman

== Game summaries ==
=== At Geneva ===
Week 1: Pitt at Geneva

Team	1	2	3	4	Total
• Pitt	13	14	7	13	47
Geneva	0	0	0	0	0

- Date: October 2, 1920
- Location: High School Field
  Beaver Falls, PA
- Game start: 3:00 p.m.
- Game attendance: 4,000
- Referee: James C. Holderness (Lehigh)

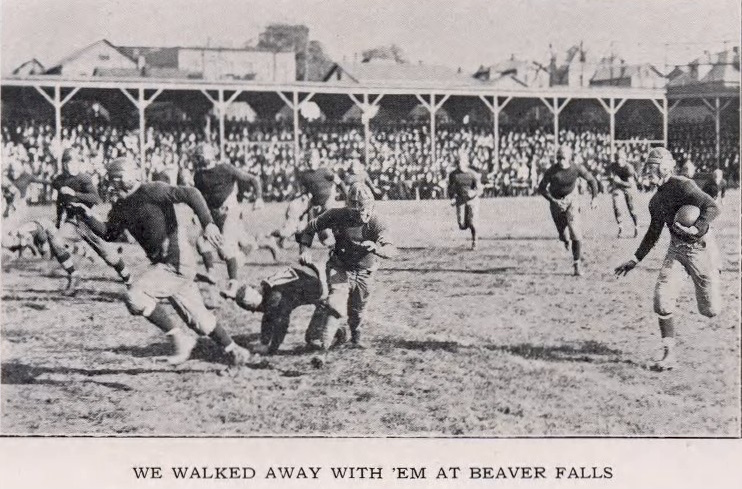
Photo from October 2, 1920 Geneva vs. Pitt game

For the second season in a row, the Panthers opened their season on the road at Beaver Falls, PA, home of the Geneva Covenanters. Geneva was led by fourth year coach Philip Henry Bridenbaugh. The 1920 Covenanters played all eight of their games at home and earned a 5–2–1 record, losing only to Pitt and Wash. & Jeff. "Graduate Manager M. R. Glover, of the Covenantors, has been advertising this game extensively throughout western Pennsylvania, especially in the Beaver valley, and a crowd that will tax the capacity of the park is anticipated. A preliminary game will be played by the Beaver Falls and Salem, O. high schools and the Pitt – Geneva game will follow. This is considered a big event in the Beaver valley." The Gazette Times reported: "The men are feeling fit and for the greater part are in the best condition for the Pitt game."

On game day, Harry Keck of The Gazette Times noted: "The Panther squad will leave for Beaver Falls in a body at 10:25 this morning, arriving before noon. It will be accompanied by the Pitt student band and a small batch of rooters. Three of the players counted upon to start for the Panthers will not be available. They are Harman, star tackle, who has an injured ankle; Anderson, halfback, who still is nursing hurts received in camp; and Dode Thomas, who is laid up with a cold."

The Gazette Times reported: "Glenn Warner's University of Pittsburgh eleven, minus his guidance, this afternoon inaugurated its 1920 football season by trimming Geneva College on the High School Field here, 47 to 0. The points were scored through the medium of seven touchdowns and five resultant goals."

"The work of Herb McCracken stood out above that of his fellows in the few minutes he was in the game as he broke away from a scrimmage and ran 58 yards through a broken field for the first touchdown. Nobody knows how Herb stayed in the game for he was taken out during the intermission between the first and second quarter when it was found that he was unconscious and had been playing since the first play of the game without knowing what he was doing. He didn't even know he had scored a touchdown until he was told about it."

In addition to McCracken, Tom Davies scored two touchdowns and Mike Hartnett, John Anderson, Orville Hewitt and J. Franklin Byers each tallied one. The goals from touchdowns were scored by committee also; Tom Davies made two with Tom Holleran, James Bond and Oscar Kratzert each kicking one. "Every one of the players on the squad was given a chance to get into the game by Floyd Rose, Warner's right-hand man, who was in charge in the absence of Pop, who went to Morgantown to scout West Virginia University in its game with Lehigh. Geneva did not make a first down and never had a chance on either offense or defense."

The Pitt lineup for the game against Geneva was Bill Edgar (left end), Louis Markowitz (left tackle), James Bond (left guard), Herb Stein (center), John McLean (right guard), William Gourley (right tackle), Tom Holleran (quarterback), Tom Davies (left halfback), Herb McCracken (right halfback) and Orville Hewitt (fullback). Substitutes appearing in the game for Pitt were Anderson, Bremen, Bowser, Byers, Clark, Clawson, Hartnett, Herkowitz, Horner, Kelly, Kramer, Laughran, Murdoch, Magarrall, Montieth, McCrory, Sacklowski, Simpson, Storer and Williams. The game was played in two 15-minute quarters and two 12-minute quarters.

=== West Virginia ===
Week 2: West Virginia at Pitt

Team	1	2	3	4	Total
West Virginia	6	0	7	0	13
• Pitt	14	7	7	6	34

- Date: October 9, 1920
- Location: Forbes Field
  Pittsburgh, PA
- Game start: 3:00 p.m.
- Game attendance: 22,000
- Game weather: Sunny
- Referee: Nathan A. Tufts (Brown)

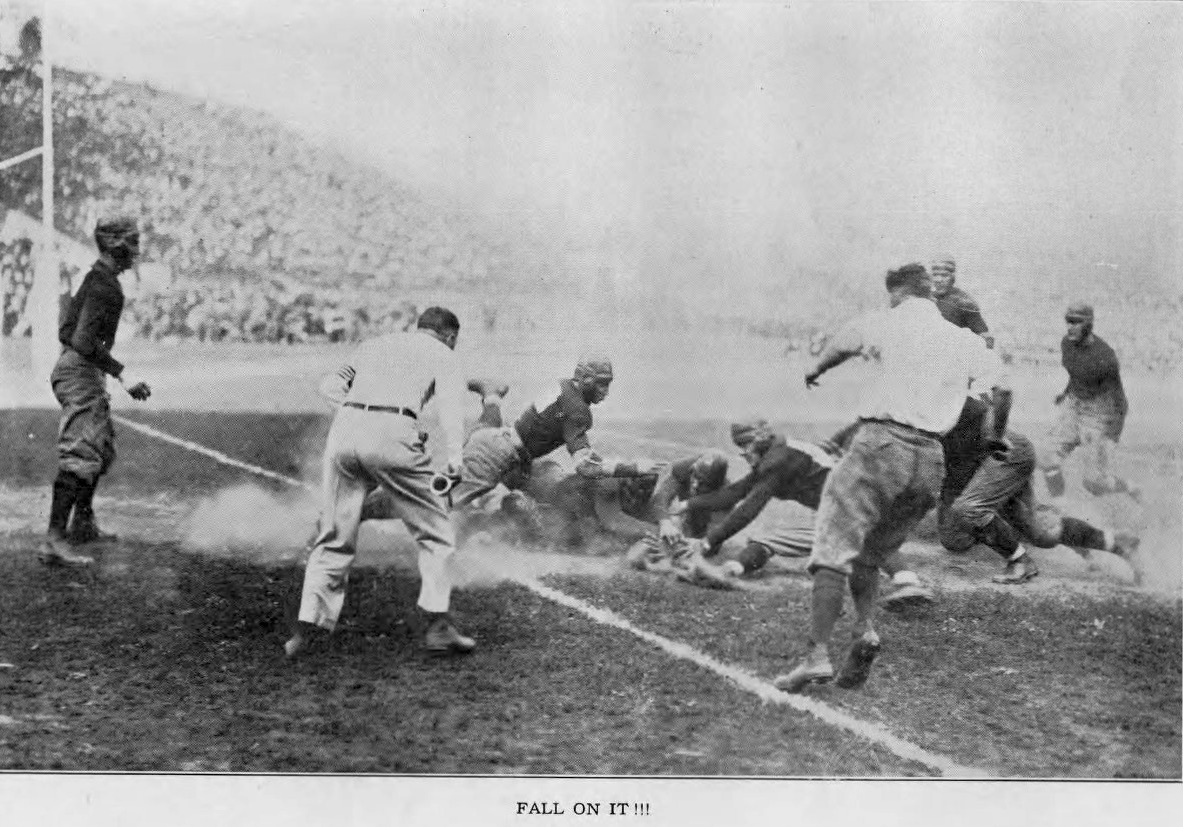
1920 Pitt football game photo

The Panthers home opener of the 1920 season was against the West Virginia Mountaineers. Pitt led the all-time series 9–5–1. The Mountaineers won 5 of the first 6 meetings. In 1904 the Panthers won 53–0 and proceeded to win seven of the next eight meetings with the one exception being a tie game in 1909. The Panthers out scored the Mountaineers 146 to 9 over that period. Mountaineer coach Mont McIntire, in his fourth and final year at the helm, plus his 1920 squad arrived in Pittsburgh with a 1–0–1 record having tied Lehigh and beaten West Virginia Wesleyan. "The Mountaineer coaches have guarded against any overconfidence this fall, and the outcome of the two games already played by their charges have been sufficiently close to prevent any swelled heads among their charges." "Both squads will have their strongest combinations on the field, well bolstered with eager and able reserves."

Harry Keck of The Gazette Times reported: "Under a cloudless sky and with the temperature very comfortable for the spectators, of whom there were something like 22,000 on hand, the University of Pittsburgh football team inaugurated its home season at Forbes Field yesterday afternoon by defeating the West Virginia University eleven, 34 to 13, a margin of five touchdowns to two."

West Virginia scored first. The Mountaineers received the opening kick-off and the Pitt defense held, but WVU halfback Carl Beck raced 26 yards on a fake punt to the Pitt 38-yard line. Five plays advanced the ball to the Pitt 16-yard line and finally a forward pass from Martin to Lentz netted the first score of the game. Martin failed to kick the goal. Score - WVU 6, Pitt 0. After an exchange of possessions, Pitt had the ball on its own 38-yard line. A triple pass from Orville Hewitt to Tom Davies to Herb McCracken gained 54 yards to the Mountaineers' 8-yard line. Hewitt fumbled but Herb Stein recovered on the 2-yard line. "Davies went around right end for a touchdown. Davies kicked goal. Score - Pitt 7, West Virginia 6." Pitt kicked off and four plays later the Panthers recovered a fumble on the West Virginia 33-yard line. On first down Pitt quarterback Tom Holleran raced the 33 yards into the end zone for Pitt's second touchdown. Davies kicked goal. Score – Pitt 14, West Virginia 6. Early in the second period Pitt recovered a fumble on the Mountaineers' 18-yard line. After a holding penalty, Pitt completed a pass to the 10-yard line. On first down "Hewitt plunged through right guard to within a foot of the goal. Hewitt failed on the next try. On the next play Hewitt went over for a touchdown. Davies kicked goal." Halftime score – Pitt 21, West Virginia 6.

Coach Warner made multiple substitutions for the third period. Pitt's second possession of the half started on their own 21-yard line. They quickly advanced the ball to the West Virginia 25-yard line. "On a double pass, Anderson to Laughran, who forwarded to Davies, netted another Pitt touchdown. Davies kicked goal." Score: Pitt 28, West Virginia 6. Late in the quarter, "Davies punted to (Carl) Beck on West Virginia's 35-yard line, and he ran 65 yards for a touchdown through the whole Pitt team. Martin kicked goal. Score: Pitt 28, West Virginia 13." Late in the fourth quarter Pitt gained possession on the Mountaineer 20-yard line. Three rushes through the line placed the ball on the 9-yard line. "A triple pass, Anderson to Laughran to Byers took the ball over for another touchdown. Byers failed at goal." Final Score: Pitt 34 – West Virginia 13. West Virginia finished the season with a 5–4–1 record.

The Pitt lineup for the game against West Virginia was John McCrory (left end), Louis Markowitz (left tackle), John McLean (left guard), Herb Stein (center), James Bond (right guard), William Gourley (right tackle), Frank Williams (right end), Tom Holleran (quarterback), Tom Davies (left halfback), Herb McCracken (right halfback) and Orville Hewitt (fullback). Substitutes appearing in the game for Pitt were: Bill Edgar, Charles Bowser, John Laughran, John Clark, Henry Magarrall, Jack Sachlowski, Leon Kelly, Fred Ewing, Adolph Herskowitz and John Anderson. The game was played in 15-minute quarters.

=== At Syracuse ===
Week 3: Pitt at Syracuse

Team	1	2	3	4	Total
Pitt	7	0	0	0	7
Syracuse	0	0	7	0	7

- Date: October 16, 1920
- Location: Archbold Stadium
  Syracuse, NY
- Game start: 2:30 p.m.
- Game attendance: 15,000
- Game weather: rain
- Referee: J. J. Hallahan (Boston Globe)

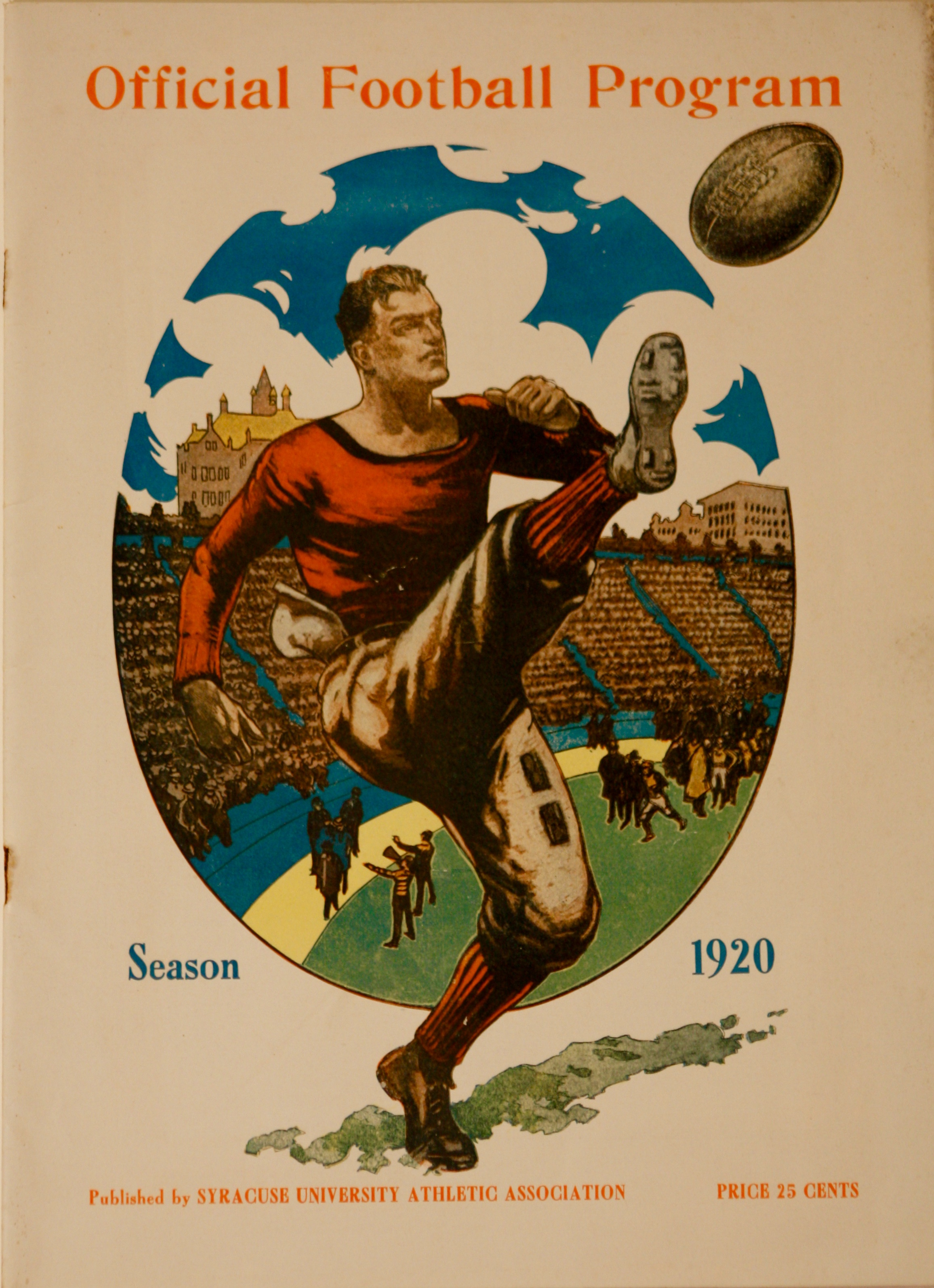
Program for October 16, 1920 Syracuse vs. Pitt game

The second road game for the Panthers was a train ride to Syracuse, NY to do battle with the strong Orangemen team that trampled them 24 to 3 the previous October. First year coach Chick Meehan, former Syracuse quarterback, had a squad with at least eight lettermen from last year, two of which were named All-American – center, Joe Alexander and tackle, Bert Gulick. The Orangemen came into the game with a 3–0 record having outscored their opponents 149–7. They would finish the season with a 6–2–1 record.

Harry Keck of The Gazette Times reported on the reception received at the train station when the Panthers arrived in Syracuse: "The most rabid 'welcome' a Pitt football team ever received on its jaunts to gridirons away from home greeted the Panther gridders when they set foot in Syracuse shortly after 9 o'clock tonight...A crowd of several thousand students and citizens had gathered at the depot long before the train pulled in and when Coach Glenn Warner and his huskies got out of their coach they were greeted with mingled cheers and jeers that echoed through the station shed. Outside, automobile horns blared and sirens shrieked and everywhere were signs bearing the battle cry of the Orange to wit: 'Beat Pitt!'... The Pitt party had to fight its way, and once it made the street, it found its way blocked by a large gathering around the Syracuse student band. It was truly an inspiring scene, probably the greatest demonstration of its kind ever put on anywhere with the motive of cheering the home team on to victory."

Grantland Rice penned a story for The Pittsburgh Sunday Post: "Starting under a leaden sky that turned as black as sable on the wings of an autumn storm that ushered in a driving rain, Syracuse and Pittsburgh finished today in a 7- to -7 draw. In spite of threatening clouds with an early shower before the game began, close to 20,000 football lovers filed into the artistic Archbold Stadium to see Chick Meehan's big, fast eleven repeat the triumph of last year. But upon this occasion Glen Warner brought up a team of equal merit. The drawn score was just about as it should be in proving any lack of advantage either way."

"Due to the wet condition of the field, there were no less than 16 fumbles." "Fumbling proved costly to both sides and was indirectly responsible for both teams' scoring. In the first half, Abbott, Syracuse fullback, fumbled on his own 25-yard line, with Stein recovering for Pitt. From that point Pitt carried the ball over on straight football." "Anderson, Davies, McCracken and Hewitt hit first the right and then the left side of the line, and on the last play 'Tiny' Hewitt, the giant fullback literally rolled over the opposing line for the touchdown." Davies kicked goal. "Then, when it seemed that there would be no more scoring and that again the Pittsburgh Panthers would be returned a winner, the fortunes of the game turned to the New Yorkers. It was Pitt's ball in the center of the field, and on an attempted double pass from Anderson to Laughran, the wet, slimy football slipped from the arms of the fleet back, and Gulick, the Syracuse right tackle, scooped up the ball and without opposition dashed half the length of the field, registering a touchdown and making it possible for Abbott to tie the score."

The Pitt lineup for the game against Syracuse was John McCrory (left end), Harvey Harman (left tackle), James Bond (left guard), Herb Stein (center), John McLean (right guard), William Gourley (right tackle), Frank Williams (right end), Herb McCracken (quarterback), Tom Davies (left halfback), John Anderson (right halfback) and Orville Hewitt (fullback). Substitutes appearing in the game for Pitt were: John Laughran, Jack Sacklowski, John Clark, Bill Edgar, Charles Bowser and Louis Markowitz. The game was played in 15-minute quarters.

=== Georgia Tech ===
Week 4: Georgia Tech at Pitt

Team	1	2	3	4	Total
Georgia Tech	0	3	0	0	3
• Pitt	0	0	0	10	10

- Date: October 23, 1920
- Location: Forbes Field
  Pittsburgh, PA
- Game start: 3:00 p.m.
- Game attendance: 27,000
- Referee: Charles J. McCarty Jr. (Germantown Academy)

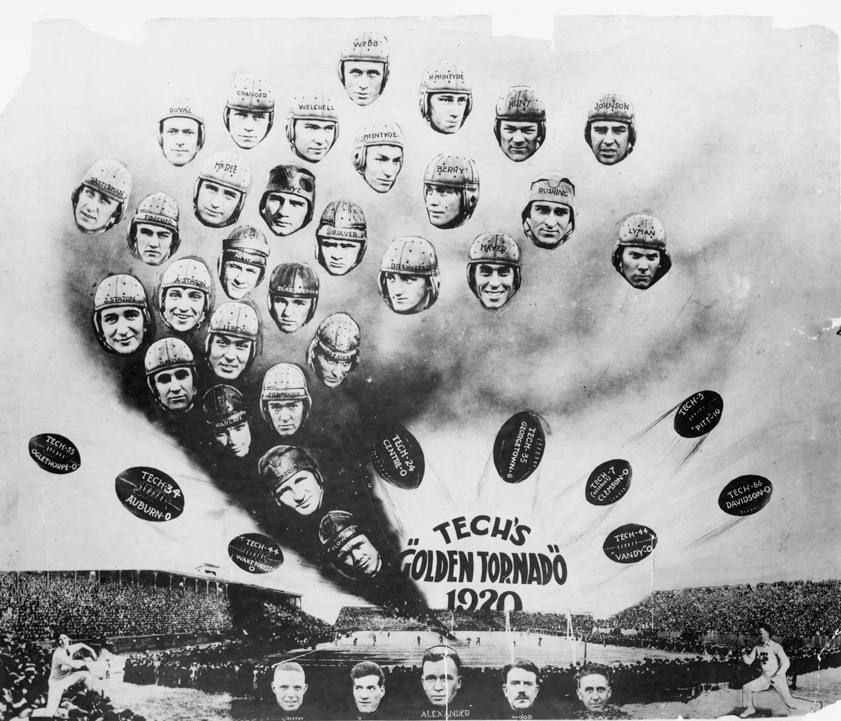
Georgia Tech Golden Tornado team photo

"The annual North-South struggle with the Golden Tornado of Georgia Tech is the next battle on the hands of the Panthers Saturday at Forbes Field, and that the battle will be a hummer goes without saying. It always is." First year coach Bill Alexander, whose team was 4–0 and had outscored the opposition 209–0, "learned all he knows about the game from John Heisman, who is now coaching at Old Penn." His lineup boasts three All-America players: end, Bill Fincher, guard Dummy Lebey and fullback Buck Flowers. The Pittsburgh Sunday Post reported: "This bunch has been coordinated with only the Pitt game in view. Atlanta papers..have been filled with reference to this game for several weeks, and streaming across the top of the pages are such slogans as: 'We Must Beat Pitt – We Will Beat Pitt,' 'Blow the Panther Out of the Way,' 'Watch the Tornado Do to Pitt What Alexia Sterling' Did to Dorothy Hurd,' and similar lines."

Coach Alexander spoke with The Pittsburgh Post: "I think my team this fall is better than any Georgia Tech outfit that has been seen in Pittsburgh, and am sure the Panthers will have nothing easy on Saturday. We are here to win and we are not making any bones about it."

Coach Warner wrote in The Pittsburg Press: "To win Pitt must be on her toes every moment, and put up the hardest fight her players are capable of. If the players do that, I am not afraid of the result." The coach made some lineup adjustments. Charles Bowser started at quarterback for the injured Tom Holleran and Leon Kelly replaced the injured Bill Gourley at tackle. Fullback Orville "Tiny" Hewitt was held out for second half duty, while John Anderson started.

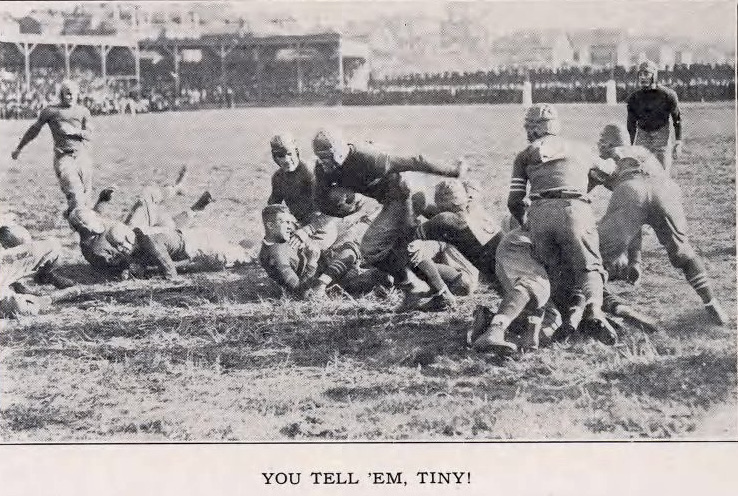
"Tiny Hewitt" gaining yards, 1920 Pitt game

Harry Keck recapped:

Outplayed by a wide margin and trailing by a score of 3 to 0 at the end of the first half, the University of Pittsburgh eleven came back in the second half at Forbes Field yesterday afternoon and defeated the best team Georgia Tech ever has sent here, the final score being 10 to 3. Twenty-two thousand persons witnessed the game and were treated to many a thrill and missed heartbeats as the close contest wore on until Pitt got the break that enabled it to turn threatening defeat into victory. This came in the third quarter, when Sacklowski, the guard, broke through and blocked a punt by Buck Flowers, the Georgia Tech captain, on the 28-yard line and Flowers had to scurry to make the recovery on the 15. A succeeding punt by Flowers went only to the middle of the field and was run back by Red Byers, subbing for Davies at left halfback, to the 24-yard line. From this point on, 'Tiny' Hewitt, the tubby fullback, carried the ball on three plays...to the nine-yard line before the end of the third quarter. On the first play of the fourth quarter, Hewitt plunged through the line again and made a first down on the one-yard line and on the next try he lugged the pigskin over. Davies kicked goal. There in a nutshell, is the story of how the game was won for Pitt.

Georgia Tech scored late in the second quarter. Their offense advanced the ball to the Pitt 11-yard line and faced a fourth and seven. Flowers backed up to the 18-yard line and kicked it through the uprights for a 3 to 0 lead for Georgia Tech. After Pitt's fourth quarter touchdown, their defense forced Tech to punt and the Pitt offense moved the ball to the Tech 23-yard line. "Davies went back to the 30-yard line to try a placement goal, Holleran holding the ball. It was good. Score – Pitt 10, Georgia Tech 3." The Yellow Jackets finished the season 8–1.

The Pitt lineup for the game against Georgia Tech was Bill Edgar (left end), Harvey Harman (left tackle), James Bond (left guard), Herb Stein (center), John McLean (right guard), Leon Kelly (right tackle), Frank Williams (right end), Charles Bowser (quarterback), Tom Davies (left halfback), Herb McCracken (right halfback) and John Anderson (fullback). Substitutes appearing in the game for Pitt were: John McCrory, Jack Sacklowski, Louis Markowitz, William Gourley, Fred Ewing, Frank Byers, Tom Holleran and Orville Hewitt. The game was played in 15-minute quarters.

Immediately after the game the University of Pittsburgh athletic authorities severed all athletic relations with the Georgia Institute of Technology. The statement read:

The break is due to a discovery on Pitt's part that three of the Georgia Tech stars had played more than four years of football allowed by the rules of first-class colleges and specified definitely in the articles of agreement between the two schools....We at once sent word to the team's manager that we desired a conference. This conference was not held until this morning, owing to the failure of the Georgians to come around. We met them this morning and told them they could not use the three men mentioned (Flowers, Fincher and Staton). They refused to keep them out and said unless they played the team would not go on the field. Inasmuch as thousands of tickets had been sold and we did not want to disappoint our patrons, we decided to go through with the game but to sever relations immediately after it was over.

Pitt and Tech would not meet on the football field again until the controversial 1956 Sugar Bowl.

=== Lafayette ===
Week 5: Lafayette at Pitt

Team	1	2	3	4	Total
Lafayette	0	0	0	0	0
• Pitt	7	7	0	0	14

- Date: October, 1920
- Location: Forbes Field
  Pittsburgh, PA
- Game start: 2:30 p.m.
- Game attendance: 15,000
- Referee: F. A. Lambert (Ohio State)

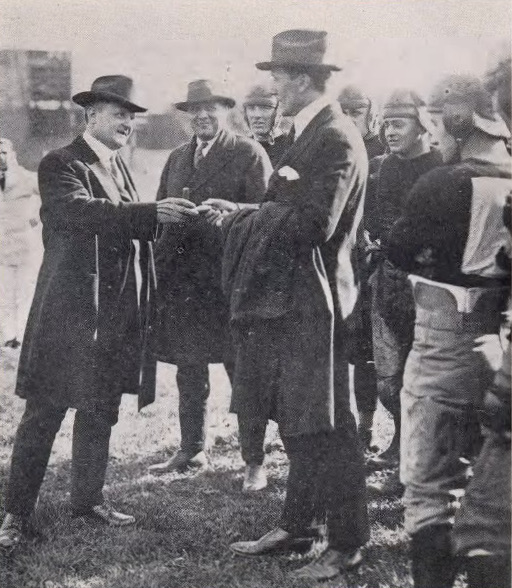
Lafayette coach Jock Sutherland presented watch by Pitt Dental School

The Gazette Times was excited about the Lafayette game: "Next Saturday the Warnerites will entertain the Lafayette College eleven from Easton, Pa. at Forbes Field, and unless all signs fail, it will be 'some' party. The Eastonians are coached by Dr. John B. (Jock) Sutherland, one of the greatest linemen the local school ever turned out and one of Pop Warner's best pupils." Lafayette had a 2–2 record, having beaten Catholic University 84 to 0 in their last game. They would finish the season with a 5–3 record.

Coach Warner praised his pupil: "Jock Sutherland knows football" says Pop, "and any team he coaches is a foe to be reckoned with. He has good material, and I know it is well coached. It will be a hard game."

Prior to the game, Dean Friessell of the Dental School presented Coach Sutherland with a gold watch, a gift from his alma mater.

"The game was played in the first real football weather of the year, and the tinge of autumn in the air helped to keep the fans on edge, but the contest was comparatively featureless." Ralph S. Davis of The Pittsburg Press reported: "It was master against pupil yesterday at Forbes Field and the Old Master won. Glenn Warner's Pitt Panthers tackled Jock Sutherland's Lafayette outfit from Easton, and won 14 to 0. Tom Davies was the outstanding star of the battle. He scored every one of Pitt's points. In the first period on a triple pass, he skirted left end for a 49 yard run across the Eastonian's goal line, and then kicked goal. In the second period on a pass from McCracken, Davies ran 26 yards for Pitt's other touchdown, and also kicked goal."

The Owl noted: "From tackle to tackle the Lafayette line outplayed the Pitt line, with Schwab as the outstanding star. Time and time again they marched down the field only to lose the ball on downs within our 20-yard line."

The Pitt lineup for the game against Lafayette was Bill Edgar (left end), William Gourley (left tackle), Jack Sacklowski (left guard), Herb Stein (center), James Bond (right guard), Louis Markowitz (right tackle), John McCrory (right end), Herb McCracken (quarterback), John Anderson (left Halfback), Tom Davies (right halfback) and Orville Hewitt (fullback). Substitutes appearing in the game for Pitt were: R. M. Simpson, Adolph Herskowitz, Dode Thomas, Henry Magarrell, Mike Hartnett and John McLean. The game was played in 15-minute quarters.

=== At Penn ===
Week 6: Pitt at Penn

Team	1	2	3	4	Total
• Pitt	0	14	6	7	27
Penn	7	0	0	14	21

- Date: November 6, 1920
- Location: Franklin Field
  Philadelphia, PA
- Game start: 2:30 p.m.
- Game attendance: 25,500
- Game weather: Ideal
- Referee: Carl A. Reed (Springfield College)

The last road game for the 1920 season was a train trip across the state to Philadelphia to do battle with the Penn Quakers, now led by ex-Georgia Tech coach John Heisman. The Quakers owned a 4–2 record, but were on a two game losing streak, having lost to VMI and Penn State. They would finish the season with a 6–4 record. The Pittsburg Press noted: "The Quakers are admittedly in the best condition they have been since their opening game. Several players who were injured have been nursed along, and will be at their best today against the Pittsburghers."

Coach Warner warned his team: "Old Penn is desperate," he told his charges last night. "She has won lucky games this fall until she tackled Penn State, when she was crushed until the last period. If there is any come-back in the team, it is due to assert itself on Saturday, and we will be the victims of the hardest play Penn has yet shown, I am sure. Our team is battered, and it is going to take herculean work on the part of those who are in shape to stem the tide and bring home the victory." Warner's starting lineup will be minus Orville Hewitt at fullback, Tom Holleran at quarterback and Harvey Harman at tackle.

Perry Lewis of The Philadelphia Inquirer wrote: "The Penn football team lost another decision yesterday, but in losing proved itself to be greater than the University of Pittsburgh eleven, to which it succumbed by a score of 27 to 21. Never did gridiron warriors representing the institution beyond the Schuylkill wage a more amazing and heartbreaking battle than that against Pitt on Franklin Field, and on no page in all the glorious football history of the Red and Blue is there recorded a more inspiring exhibition of fighting spirit than that displayed by the sons of Father Penn yesterday. Yet, Pitt won – won because in her line-up was a super-player, one Davies, halfback extraordinary."

The Pitt Owl confirmed: "On November 6, Tommy Davies, Pittsburgh's wonder man, defeated the University of Pennsylvania in one of the most thrilling grid battles ever staged at Franklin Field. That tells the story of the Penn game. The Quakers showed a reverse of form and played a strong game. Their aerial attack was a bewilderment and the Pitt goal line was crossed thrice. But that could not beat Tom Davies. For Pitt's first score Davies threw a forward pass to Holleran, who scored. On the next kick-off he ran through the Penn team 90 yards for a touchdown. In the third period Davies scored again through two 30 yard runs and to finish a good days work in the last period he caught a Penn forward pass and ran 60 yards for a touchdown. Davies had ten other men to help him, of course, but his feats stand out as the greatest single handed exhibition of the year."

The Pitt lineup for the game against Penn was John McCrory (left end), Jack Sacklowski (left tackle), James Bond (left guard), Herb Stein (center), John McLean (right guard), Leon Kelly (right tackle), Bill Edgar (right end), Cjharles Bowser (quarterback), Tom Davies (left halfback), Herb McCracken (right halfback) and John Anderson (fullback). Substitutes appearing in the game for Pitt were: R. M. Simpson, Tom Holleran, Mike Hartnett and William Gourley. The game was played in 15 minute quarters.

Coach Warner played a trick on the scouts from Wash. & Jeff and Penn State, in addition to unsuspecting Quaker fans. He sent the list of player numbers to the Penn Manager to be printed in the game program, but then on game day he switched everyone's number. Thankfully, the press box was given an updated list.

=== Washington & Jefferson ===
Week 7: Washington & Jefferson at Pitt

Team	1	2	3	4	Total
W. & J.	0	0	0	0	0
• Pitt	7	0	0	0	7

- Date: November 13, 1920
- Location: Forbes Field
  Pittsburgh, PA
- Game start: 2:30 p.m.
- Game attendance: 31,500
- Game weather: cold
- Referee: Nathan A. Tufts (Brown)

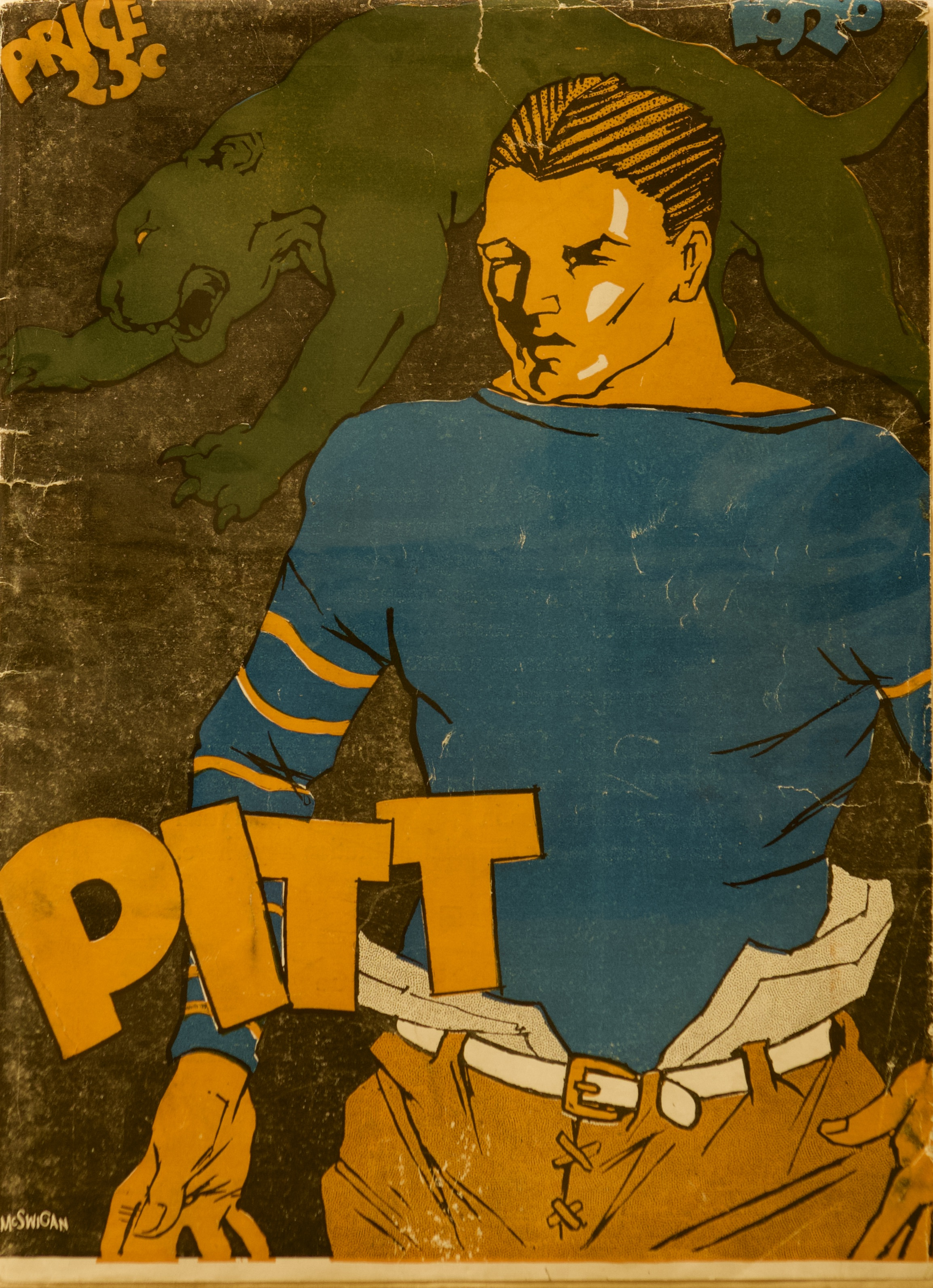
Program for November 13, 1920 Pitt vs. W. & J. game

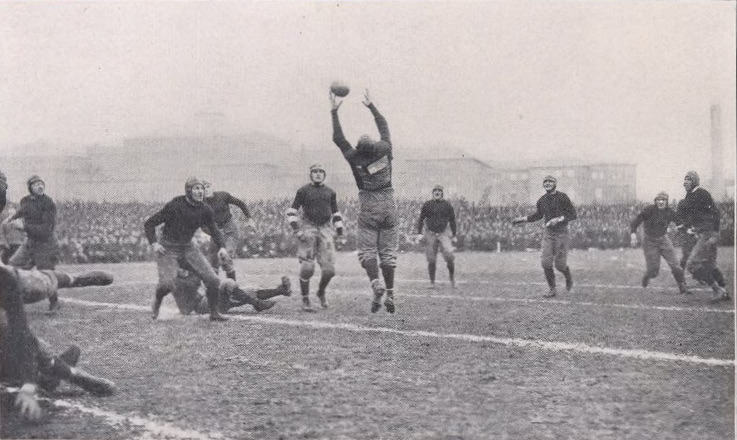
Holleran catching pass in 1920 W. & J. game

David C. Morrow brought his W. & J. eleven to Forbes Field on November 13 for the annual battle for Western Pennsylvania football supremacy. The Presidents had a 5–1–1 record, having just lost to Syracuse the previous week. The Presidents would finish the season with a 6–4–1 record. Tackle Russ Stein, Pitt center Herb Stein's brother, received All-America mention from noted sportswriters.

The stadium was expected to be packed as the residents of Washington, PA converge on Pittsburgh for this one day a year. "The rooting duel will be a feature of the game. W. & J. brings more followers to Pittsburgh than any other rival and the singing and cheering will be deafening."

The Pittsburg Press reported: "Reports from the Red and Black camp are to the effect that the Presidents are in better shape than at any previous time this season, and that they are fully cognizant of their own prowess and are determined to win the game at all hazards."

Coach Warner wrote that the Panthers, with their 5–0–1 record, were not a championship team. He bemoaned the fact that injuries have kept Pitt from both scrimmaging and having its starting lineup in place. He felt his team had been lucky. "The team has yet to show that it is anywhere near championship caliber."

Ralph S. Davis reported: "Tom Davies, Pitt's super-man, came through again yesterday – and the Panther scored its sixth consecutive triumph over Washington & Jefferson...The score was 7 to 0." The touchdown came at the end of the first quarter. Pitt was lined up in punt formation on W. & J.'s 43-yard line and the ball was snapped to Davies. "Around left end he ran, then darted to the other side of the field, and down near the sideline, past the Wash-Jeff secondary defense, and across the goal line for a touchdown...Tom kicked the goal making it 7 to 0 and it remained unchanged during the remainder of the game."

Early in the game Wash – Jeff moved the ball to the Pitt 10-yard line but the Pitt defense stiffened and regained possession. In the third quarter Pitt advanced the ball to the Presidents' one foot line and lost the ball on downs. Twice more the Pitt offense penetrated the W. & J. ten-yard line but were unable to capitalize.

"A new football attendance record for Pittsburgh was established on Saturday at the Pitt – W. & J. game at Forbes Field, when more than 31,500 persons passed through the turnstiles."

The Pitt lineup for the game against Washington & Jefferson was John McCrory (left end), Harvey Harman (left tackle), Jack Sacklowski (left guard), Herb Stein (center), John McLean (right guard), William Gourley (right tackle), Bill Edgar (right end), Tom Holleran (quarterback), Tom Davies (left halfback), Herb McCracken (right halfback) and John Anderson (fullback). Substitutes appearing in the game for Pitt were: Leon Kelly, Orville Hewitt and James Bond. The game was played in 15-minute quarters.

=== Penn State ===
Week 8: Penn State at Pitt

Team	1	2	3	4	Total
Penn State	0	0	0	0	0
Pitt	0	0	0	0	0

- Date: November 25, 1920
- Location: Forbes Field
  Pittsburgh, PA
- Game start: 2:30 p.m.
- Game attendance: 33,000
- Game weather: rain
- Referee: Robert W. Maxwell (Swarthmore)

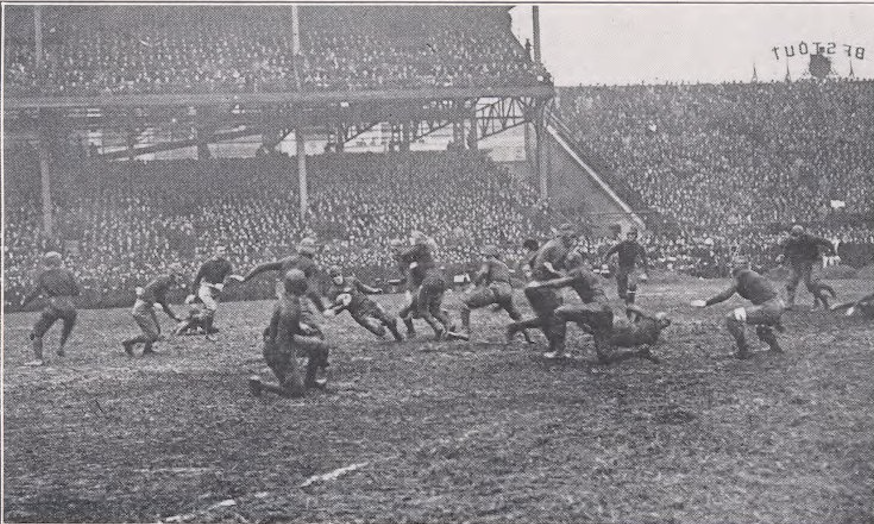
muddy field for final game

The final game of the 1920 Pitt football season pitted the undefeated Panthers against the undefeated Penn State Nittany Lions on Thanksgiving Day. The game was played on a sea of mud that covered Forbes Field. Third year coach Hugo Bezdek had his team sitting 7–0–1, with a 7–7 tie against Lehigh the only blemish. The State lineup boasted four 1920 All-American mentions: halfbacks - Charley Way and Hinkey Haines; and guards – Percy W. Griffiths and Harold Hess.

Ralph S. Davis described the past seven years of the rivalry: "The Lion was famished for six long years, and almost died of starvation. His battles with the Panther over that long period were disastrous ones and left him weak and almost lifeless. But, feeding up on smaller victims last fall, he went into his annual tussle with the Panther a rejuvenated jungle king, and tore the Warner-kept beast to pieces. But 'Pop' has a new Panther this year, and a battle royal is assured when it and the Bezdek lion get into the Forbes Field arena on Thursday."

Coach Warner noted: "I do not say that my team will win, but my players are in better condition than for some time and I know they will fight to the limit to win. If we are beaten it will be by a team that we shall be glad to bow to." Coach Bezdek added: "We have a fighting chance, and the boys will make the most of it."

Football notables from across the country were in attendance: Alonzo Stagg of Chicago with his assistants, Fred Walker and Hal Medford; Tad Jones of Yale; Bill Roper of Princeton; Chick Meehan and Bill Horr of Syracuse; and Walter Camp.

The game was played in 15-minute quarters and after the hour, the final score read 0 to 0. "State carried the ball to Pitt's 15-yard line once whereas Pitt was within the State 10-yard line several times." Tom Davies missed a field goal on one trip and Pitt turned it over on downs the other times. Davies left the game late in the second quarter with a concussion, but Red Byers proved to be a capable replacement. Defense and the muddy field kept both offenses in check.

In spite of the inclement weather 32,500 fans attended the game to set a new stadium record.

Coach Warner mused: "I would like to have seen that game played on a dry field. Had conditions been ideal, I think the luminaries who came here to see the contest would have been more than satisfied."

The Pitt lineup for the game against Penn State was John McCrory (left end), Harvey Harman (left tackle), James Bond (left guard), Herb Stein (center), John McLean (right guard), Jack Sacklowski (right tackle), Bill Edgar (right end), Tom Holleran (quarterback), Tom Davies (left halfback), Herb McCracken (right halfback) and John Anderson (fullback). Substitutes appearing in the game for Pitt were: Frank "Red" Byers, Orville Hewitt, William Gourley, Frank Williams and Charles Bowser.

== Scoring summary ==
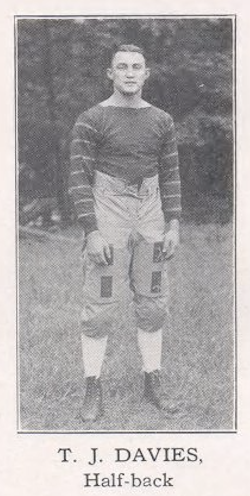
Tom Davies

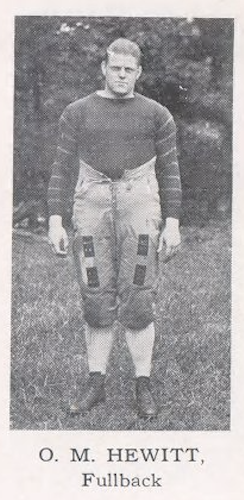
Orville Hewitt

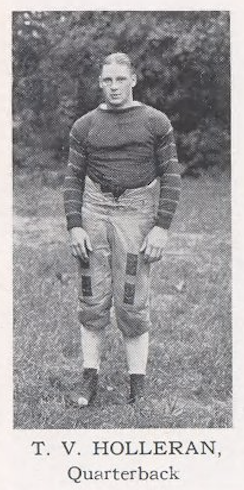
Tom Holleran

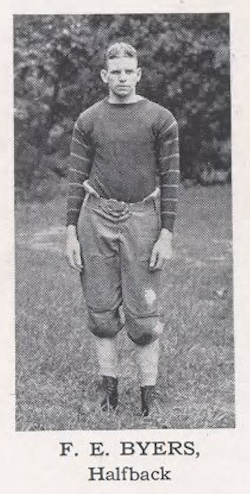
Frank Byers

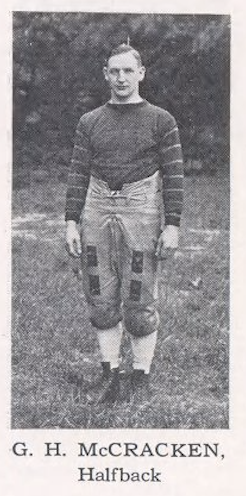
George McCracken

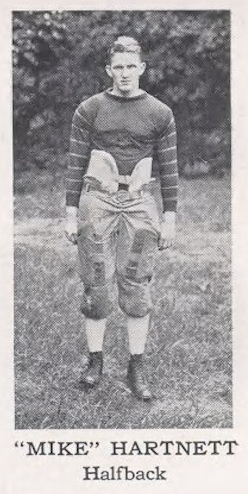
Mike Hartnett

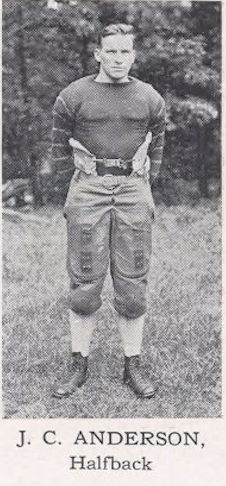
John Anderson

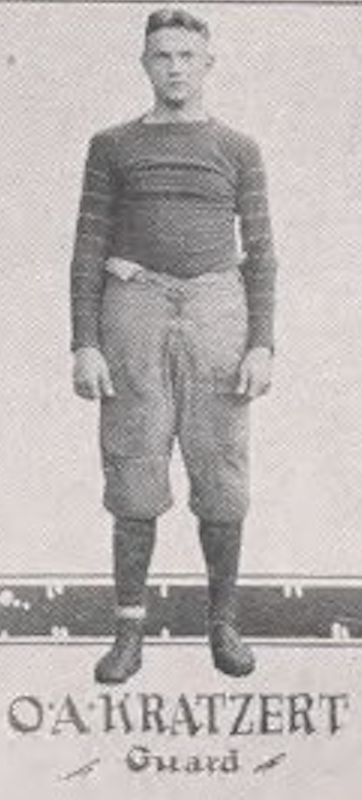
Oscar Kratzert

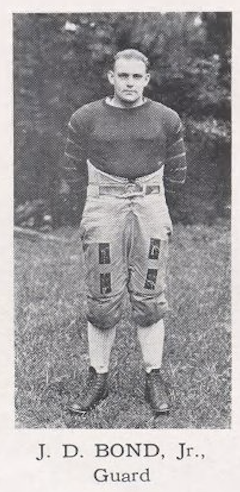
James Bond

1920 Pittsburgh Panthers scoring summary
Player	Touchdowns	Extra points	Field goals	Safety	Points
Tom Davies	10	14	1	0	77
Orville Hewitt	4	0	0	0	24
Tom Holleran	2	1	0	0	13
J. Franklin Byers	2	0	0	0	12
Herb McCracken	1	0	0	0	6
Mike Hartnett	1	0	0	0	6
John Anderson	1	0	0	0	6
Oscar Kratzert	0	1	0	0	1
James Bond	0	1	0	0	1
Totals	21	17	1	0	146

== Postseason ==
Tom Davies was elected captain for the 1921 season and letters were presented to: Herb Stein, Tom Davies, Tom Holleran, Herb McCracken, John Anderson, Orville Hewitt, Frank Byers, Charles Bowser, John McCrory, Bill Edgar, Frank Williams, Harvey Harman, William Gourley, Leon Kelly, John McLean, James Bond, Jack Sacklowski and John Clark at the annual banquet on December 2, 1920.

Only two lettermen were lost to graduation – John McCrory and Herb McCracken.

Lawrence I. Klinestiver was appointed Student Manager for the 1921 season.

=== All-American selections ===
- **Herb Stein**, center(1st team Walter Camp; 2nd team Robert W. Maxwell in Philadelphia Evening Public Ledger; Grant P. Ward, assistant coach Ohio State University, in Ohio State Journal; Frank G. Menke, sporting editor King Features Syndicate and Newspaper Feature Service, New York; Sanford B. Hunt in Newark Sunday Call; Chester L. Smith, football editor Pittsburgh Dispatch; George Y. Henger in St. Louis Times)
- Tom Davies, halfback (2nd team Walter Camp; 1st team Robert W. Maxwell in Philadelphia Evening Public Ledger; The Log, United States Naval Academy; Brayton L. Meyers of the Syracuse (Univ.) Daily Orange; Charles W. "Chick" Harley for The Lantern, Ohio State University; Grant P. Ward, assistant coach Ohio State University, in Ohio State Journal; K.K. Rockne, coach Notre Dame University; Frank G. Menke, sporting editor King Features Syndicate and Newspaper Feature Service, New York; The New York Times; Neal R. O'Hara, New York Evening World; Sanford B. Hunt in Newark Sunday Call; Carl A. Reed in Pittsburgh Press; Chester L. Smith, football editor Pittsburgh Dispatch; James M. Gould, football editor St. Louis Star; "Yank" in Bethlehem (Pa.) Times)
- John McLean, guard (Neal R. O'Hara, New York Evening World)

*Bold - Consensus All-American
