= Georgie Ratterman =

American football player (1898–1961)

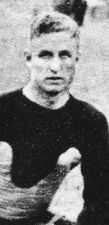
- Ratterman cropped from 1920 team picture

Profile
- Position: End

Personal information
- Born: August 28, 1898; San Francisco, California, U.S.
- Died: November 9, 1961 (aged 63); California, U.S.

Career information
- High school: Spring Hill College
- College: Georgia Tech (1920)

Awards and highlights
- SIAA championship (1920); All-Southern (1920)

George Henry "Georgie" Ratterman (August 28, 1898 – November 9, 1961) was a college football player.

== Early life ==
Ratterman grew up in Nashville, Tennessee. He prepped at Spring Hill College in Alabama, entering in 1912. There he played center and guard.

== World War 1 ==
Upon American entry into World War I in 1917, Ratterman joined the 96th Aero Squadron, Air Service, United States Army, in Kelly Field, Texas. As a first lieutenant and pilot he flew with this unit, later renamed the 96th Bombardment Squadron. He was reportedly the youngest American pilot to fly in the war at the age of 19.

He was shot down and taken prisoner on July 10, 1918. His capture was possibly with a group of six planes shot down on this date in the Toul Sector. One source reports "...Landshut, Bavaria...the old castle on the hill...which had been set aside for American aviation officers. There were eighteen of them there....pilots and observers of the 96th Aero Squadron who had been captured on 10 July." Ratterman is mentioned as part of this group. Lt. Puryear later led a group of un-named Americans to escape. A family tradition states that George had escaped the castle.

== Georgia Tech ==
Ratterman was a prominent end for the Georgia Tech Yellow Jackets of the Georgia Institute of Technology. In 1938, Ratterman was selected as an end for an all-time Tech football team 1892-1921 "prehistoric era" published in its yearbook.

=== 1920 ===
The 1920 season was William Alexander's first as head coach. The Tech team went 8–1 with its only blemish a controversial 10–3 loss to Pitt. Ratterman caught appendicitis or had some stomach pain due to his experience in a German war prison yet still managed to play the last two games; and was selected All-Southern by various selectors including Charley Moran.
