= Jack McDonough (American football) =

American football player and coach

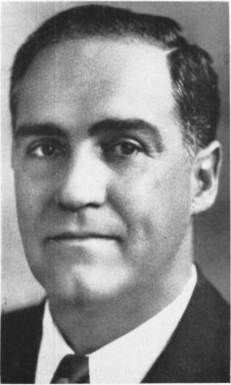
- Jack McDonough, c. 1950

Profile
- Position: Quarterback

Personal information
- Born: January 26, 1901; Savannah, Georgia, U.S.
- Died: April 1, 1983 (aged 82); Atlanta, Georgia

Career information
- College: Georgia Tech (1919–1922)

Awards and highlights
- Billy Evans' Southern Honor Roll (1922); Tech Athletics Hall of Fame (1962)

John J. McDonough (January 26, 1901 – April 1, 1983) was a college football player and one time president of Georgia Power. He also coached Savannah High School.

== Georgia Tech ==
A native of Savannah, McDonough was a star quarterback for William Alexander's Georgia Tech Yellow Jackets football teams, inducted into the school's athletics hall of fame in 1962. McDonough amassed a 26–7 record while at Tech.

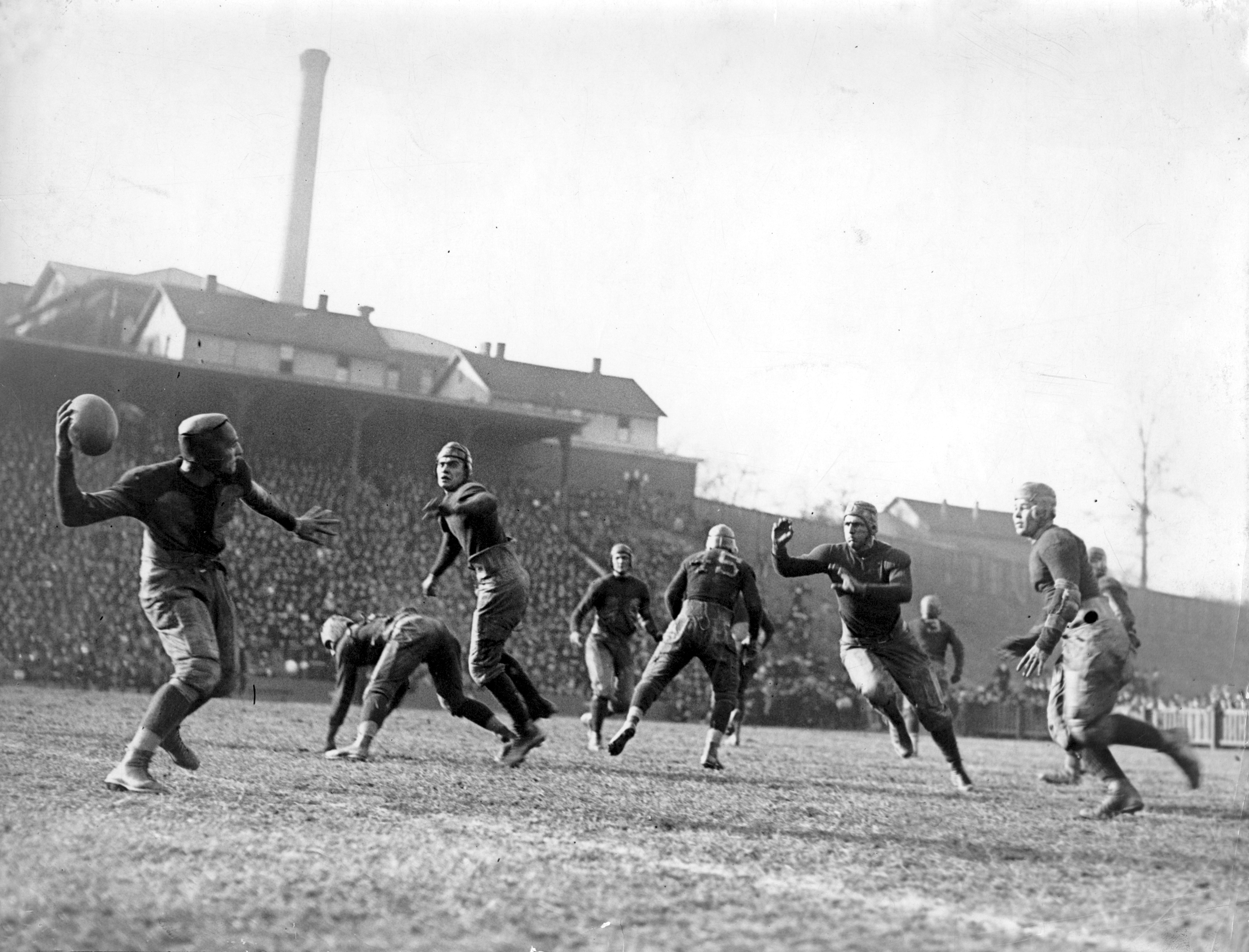
1921 Tech-Auburn game. McDonough possibly throwing the pass.

He started as a true freshman when Marshall Guill was moved to end, and only missed four games in four years due to an injury in his sophomore season caused by Pitt's Orville Hewitt.

== See also ==
- List of Georgia Tech Yellow Jackets starting quarterbacks
