= Orville Hewitt =

American football player and coach (1898–1955)

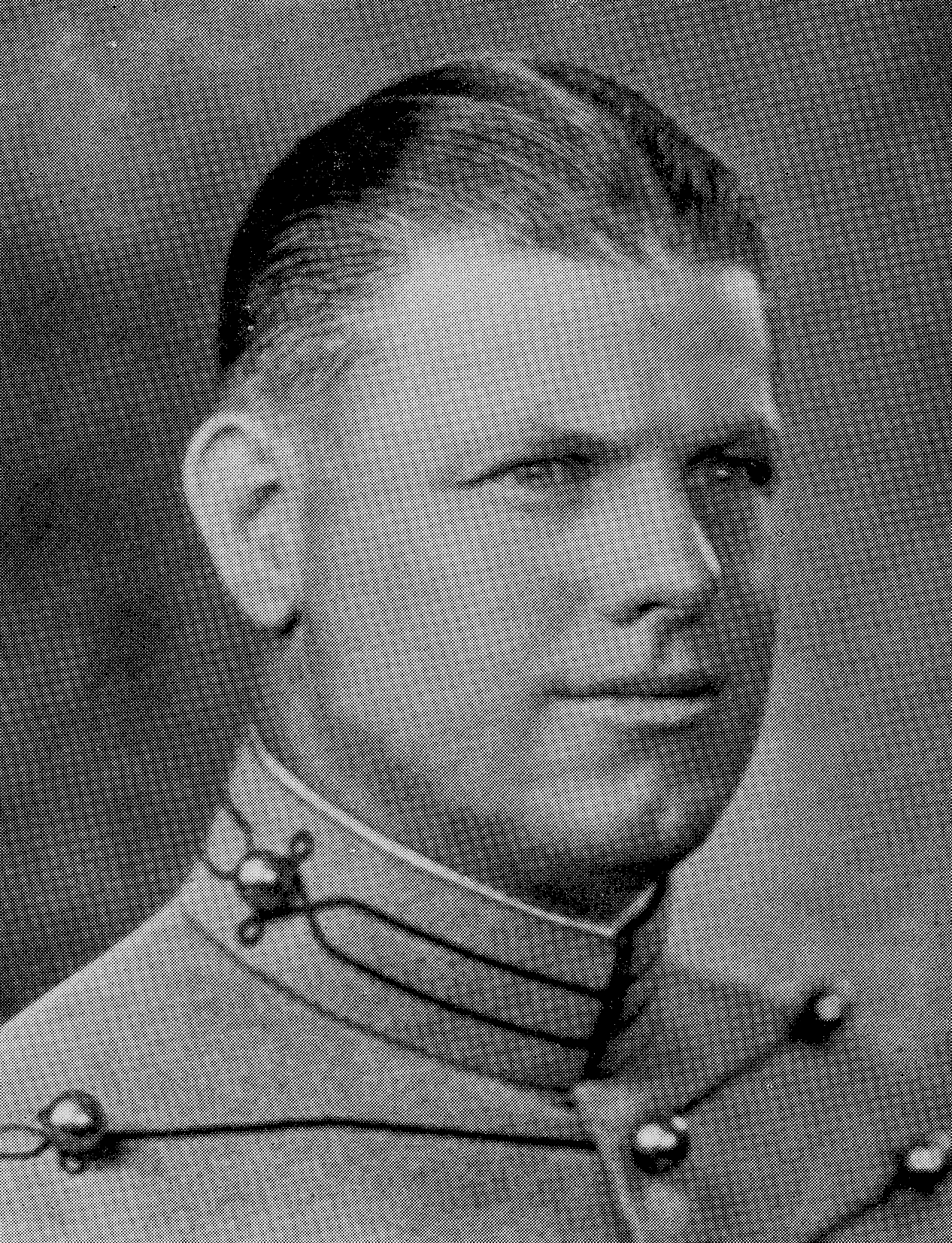
- At West Point in 1927

Biographical details
- Born: September 5, 1901; Pittsburgh, Pennsylvania, U.S.
- Died: October 29, 1955 (aged 54)

Playing career
- 1920–1922: Pittsburgh
- 1926: Army
- Position: Fullback

Coaching career (HC unless noted)
- 1930: Alabama (assistant)

Hewitt playing football for Army, circa 1926

Orville Melville "Tiny" Hewitt (September 5, 1901 – October 29, 1955) was an American college football player and coach. He played for both the Pittsburgh Panthers and Army Cadets as a 200-pound fullback. Hewitt coached for the Alabama Crimson Tide.

== Biography ==
Orville Hewitt was born on September 5, 1901.

He graduated from the United States Military Academy at West Point in 1927.

He died in Avery County, North Carolina, near Asheville, on October 29, 1955, and was buried at Arlington National Cemetery.
