= Ox McKibbon =

American athlete and coach

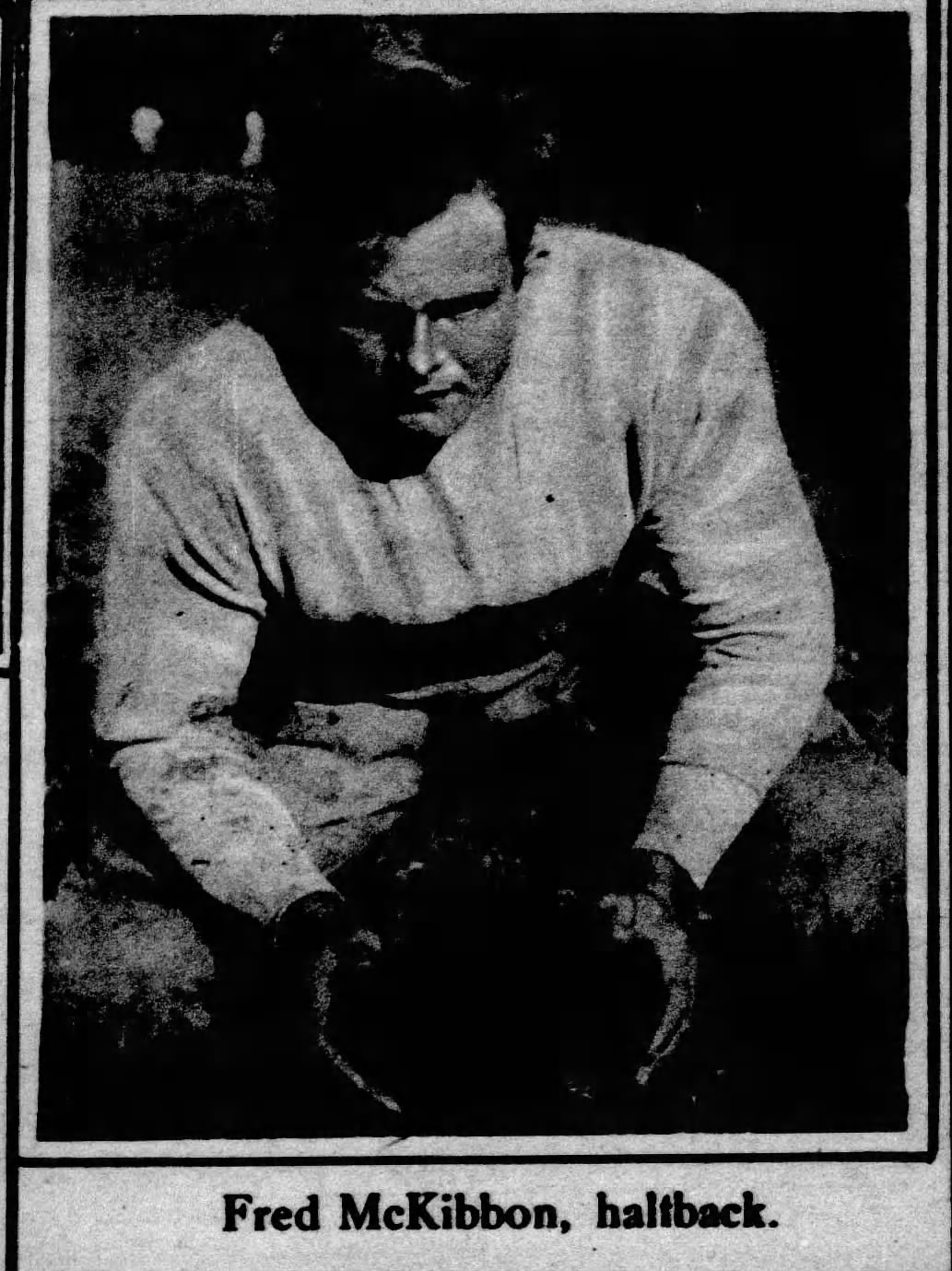

No. 21
- Position: Tackle/End

Personal information
- Born: c. 1904; Culleoka, Tennessee, U.S.

Career information
- College: Vanderbilt (1924–1926)

Awards and highlights
- All-Southern (1925, 1926)

Fred Cox "Ox" McKibbon was a college football player and baseball player and baseball coach.

== Vanderbilt ==
McKibbon was a prominent tackle and end for Dan McGugin's Vanderbilt Commodores football teams from 1924 to 1926, selected All-Southern in 1926.

=== 1924 ===
Fred Russell dubbed the 1924 season "the most eventful season in the history of Vanderbilt football." In a 13 to 0 victory over Auburn in 1924, McKibbon completed a pass run in for a touchdown by Hek Wakefield. McKibbon was a starter that year for the 16 to 6 win over Minnesota, Vanderbilt's first ever win over a Western school. He threw a touchdown to Gil Reese in the game. "It was the best coached team we saw this year," said the Minnesota newspapermen. One account reads "Fred McKibbon left Minneapolis dizzy with his crafty timing of aerial shots."

== Hume-Fogg High School ==
He coached baseball at Nashville's Hume-Fogg High School in the 1930s and 1940s.
