= Henry Wakefield (American football) =

American football player and coach (1899–1962)

- Wakefield in uniform, c. 1924 "Hek"

Vanderbilt Commodores
- Position: End / Fullback

Personal information
- Born: February 10, 1899; Petersburg, Tennessee, U.S.
- Died: November 19, 1962 (aged 63); Nashville, Tennessee, U.S.
- Listed height: 5 ft 10 in (1.78 m)
- Listed weight: 180 lb (82 kg)

Career information
- College: Vanderbilt (1921–1924)

Awards and highlights
- SIAA championship (1921); SoCon championship (1922, 1923); All-Southern (1923, 1924); Consensus All-American (1924); One of Dan McGugin's six best players.; Vanderbilt's best drop kicker; 1934 All-time Vandy team.

Henry Smith "Hek" Wakefield (February 10, 1899 – November 19, 1962) was an American college football player and coach. He played fullback and end for the Vanderbilt Commodores of Vanderbilt University from 1921 to 1924, receiving the honor of consensus All-American in his senior year. He was considered the greatest drop kicker in school history.

== Early life ==
Wakefield was born on February 10, 1899, in Petersburg, Tennessee, to Samuel S. T. Wakefield and Lula Dyer. Samuel, who owned a sawmill in Petersburg, reportedly died in 1917 as a result of burns caused by the explosion of a steam engine at his sawmill.

=== Prep school ===
Wakefield attended prep school at Fitzgerald & Clarke School in Tullahoma, Tennessee, where he won a state football title on a team coached by Wallace Wade, who later coached Wakefield at Vanderbilt. All-American Vanderbilt end Lynn Bomar was a teammate at both Fitzgerald & Clarke and Vanderbilt.

== Vanderbilt University ==
=== Football ===
Wakefield played for coach Dan McGugin's Vanderbilt Commodores from 1921 to 1924. He was a prominent member of Commodores teams that compiled a win–loss–tie record of 26–5–4 (.800) over his four seasons, and was an All-Southern selection in 1923 and 1924. The Commodores won three conference titles over this span, including their most recent one to date. He played fullback and end, as well as kicker for extra points and field goals.

==== 1921 ====
Wakefield starred in the Sewanee game to finish his freshman year. The Commodores closed the undefeated season winning 9 to 0 in what was called the "muddiest game" in its history. The Commodores were reportedly knee-deep in mud and water, with players unrecognizable. The touchdown for Vanderbilt came after Wakefield's punt of 54 yards was fumbled by Sewanee and recovered by Pos Elam. The subsequent drive resulted in a five-yard touchdown run by Wakefield. Wakefield kicked his own extra point.

==== 1922 ====
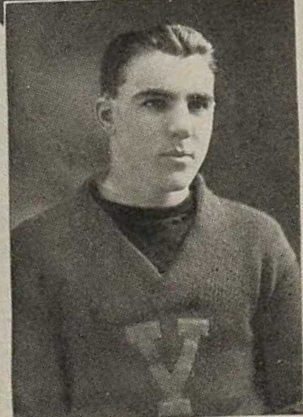
Wakefield in 1922.

Wakefield was the starting fullback and kicker for the undefeated 1922 team. He was thus a starter for the scoreless tie with Michigan at the dedication of Vanderbilt's new Dudley Field. "That's the only game in which I prayed", said Wakefield, "I was a sophomore at the time and when they put me in, I remember saying a little prayer that Michigan would run the other way." In the game against Texas at the Texas State Fair, which Vanderbilt won 20 to 10, the Commodores' first score came after Wakefield recovered a fumble by Texas's Franklin Stacy on a punt return, at the 25-yard line. Wakefield also blocked a Texas field goal attempt that day. He made an 18-yard field goal in a 9 to 0 victory over the Kentucky Wildcats. A trick play which resulted in a touchdown thrown from Doc Kuhn to Lynn Bomar against Sewanee was set up by a 33-yard punt return by Wakefield. Vanderbilt won 26 to 0, finishing the year as Southern Conference champions. Wakefield made seven extra points on the year.

==== 1923 ====
During the 1923 season, in a close loss of 3 to 0 against that season's eventual national champion, Michigan, opposing coach Fielding Yost said of Wakefield, "I never saw a greater exhibition of end play." The Kingsport Times reported that governor Austin Peay had praised Wakefield for his play that day. In the game against Tulane, Wakefield had to play quarterback. Vanderbilt was without its quarterback and captain, Doc Kuhn, as well as halfback Gil Reese. Reese had hurt his knee, and during the previous week's game against the Texas Longhorns, Kuhn was hit on the head and had yet to regain his mental composure. Vanderbilt won 17–0. Wakefield contributed a field goal to the 51–7 drubbing of the Tennessee Volunteers. Against the Georgia Bulldogs, the Commodores won 35–7. In the third quarter, Kuhn completed a 45-yard pass to Wakefield, caught at Georgia's four-yard line. From there, Vanderbilt scored with a line buck from Tom Ryan. Georgia athletic director and former coach Herman Stegeman rated Wakefield as the best player in all of the south. At year's end, Wakefield, along with Bomar, were selected as All-Southern ends. Vanderbilt and Washington & Lee finished the season as co-champions of the Southern Conference. A poll of sportswriters selected the Commodores as the best team in the south, awarding them the Champ Pickens Trophy.

===== Jack Wakefield =====
In a postseason contest played for the benefit of local charitable institutions, Vanderbilt played a cast of former Princeton varsity stars on December 8. Among the stars were Stan Keck, Frank Murrey, Hank Garrity, John P. Gorman, Ralph Gilroy, A. Barr Snively, and Herb Treat. It was the first showcase of Eastern football in Nashville in many years. The Commodores tied the team of ex-Tigers, 7–7. Both scoring plays occurred within five minutes of each other. Murrey mentored Wakefield in the art of drop-kicking.

During the game, the one player on Vanderbilt's roster not from the 1923 varsity team was Hek's younger brother, Robert Allen "Jack" Wakefield. He was a highly renowned back on the freshman team, called "the greatest player in Southern freshman football for the past season." By all accounts, he played an inspired game, "he cut an all Princeton line into shreds of Black and Orange. He threw all America tackles aside as he would throw sacks of straw, and trampled great names into the turf." Twenty-five years later, Centre head coach Charley Moran called Jack "the greatest football player I ever saw, barring nobody." It was the only game Jack ever played with a varsity team at Vanderbilt. He soon left to play professional baseball with the Saint Louis Cardinals, but twice broke his leg in preliminary work with the Cardinals, leaving him out for the season. On December 10, 1924, after a quarrel with his fiancee, Jack went to the house of a friend in Memphis and committed suicide with a pistol.

==== 1924 ====
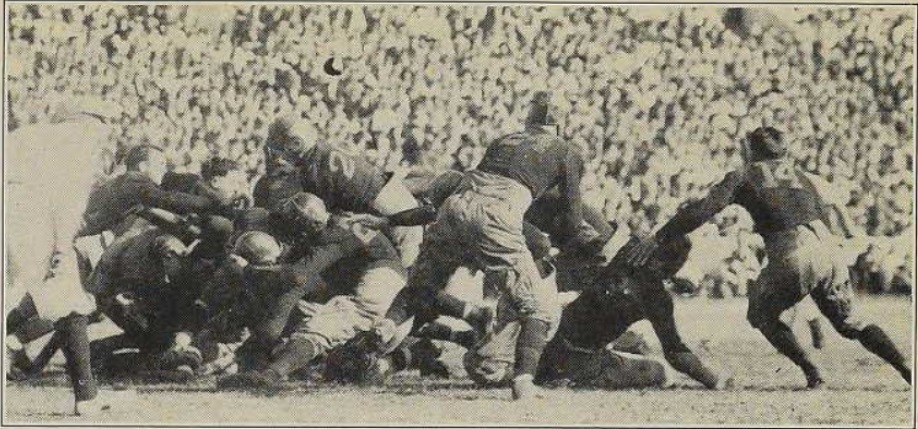
Image from the Vanderbilt–Marines game. Wakefield is at the far right, number 14.

Fred Russell's Fifty Years of Vanderbilt Football dubs 1924 "the most eventful season in the history of Vanderbilt football." Vanderbilt opened Wakefield's senior season in the rain on September 27, 1924, against Henderson-Brown at Dudley Field in Nashville, winning by a score of 13–0. Wakefield scored both touchdowns. The first came after captain and guard Tuck Kelly blocked a punt, the other on a pass into the end zone from quarterback Nig Waller. In the game with the Quantico Marines, Vanderbilt was stymied by a 13–13 tie. A newspaper account describes Vanderbilt's first score:

It was Lynn Bomar's gigantic figure that broke up what looked like a Marine cakewalk. After receiving the kickoff, the Marines drove steadily to Vanderbilt's 10-yard line as Goettge repeatedly completed short passes. At the 10, Groves dropped back. The pass from center was low. He missed it. He reached for the ball. It trickled off his fingers. The Commodores were boring in. Wakefield was in there. Then Bomar came charging through. He picked up the ball and with a twist was out of Groves' grasp. He came out of the bunch with a long, charging run. Then he seemed a little undecided. One fleeting glance behind him and he struck out. Up came his free arm to brush off his headgear. His thin, yellow hair stood out. On he swept like a thundercloud of vengeance across the goal. Bedlam broke loose.

To open the second half, Waller fumbled the kickoff. The Marines recovered and were already near the goal. The Commodores' line held the Marines scoreless inside the 10-yard line on three separate occasions, mostly due to Wakefield, Bob Ledyard, and Jess Keene.

As an interim team captain following the loss of both Kelly and Bomar to injuries, Wakefield scored twice in the Commodores' 13–0 win over the Auburn Tigers, and defeated the Georgia Tech Yellow Jackets 3–0 with a 37-yard drop-kick field goal. He also played every minute of an inspired game against Minnesota, resulting in Vanderbilt's first win over a Northern school: "Wakefield chose his plays with excellent judgement. His tackling forced the Gophers frequently to take time out, and he repeatedly threw Minnesota back for losses", reported the Nashville Tennessean. The final game with Sewanee saw the Tigers win for the first time in years, 16 to 0. In the first few minutes of play, Wakefield suffered a broken leg, yet played for ten more minutes before hobbling to the bench, joining Kelly and Bomar. Following his senior season, he was recognized as a consensus first-team All-American, having received first-team honors from the International News Service (INS), the Newspaper Enterprise Association (NEA), and Billy Evans. Wakefield was selected a second-team All-American by Walter Camp of Collier's Weekly, who said, "The south has been entirely overlooked this year on the first eleven. It is a well known fact that the experts in that section were positive Wakefield of Vanderbilt would draw one of the ends." Billy Evans, who selected Wakefield first-team All America, claimed that "Wakefield is one of the best ends I have seen in years. Southern experts rate him the greatest end the south has ever produced."

=== Track ===
Wakefield was also a member of Vanderbilt's track team.

=== Coaching career ===
After graduating from Vanderbilt, Wakefield became an assistant coach under McGugin from 1925 to 1928. He coached the ends. Larry Creson was cited as an example of a Wakefield protégé.

== Post-coaching career and death ==
Wakefield went into banking in Birmingham, Alabama, in 1929. On June 17, 1929, he was shot twice, but survived. In 1936, coach McGugin died, and Wakefield was a pall bearer. The same year, Wakefield suffered a broken jaw in a car crash.

=== Death ===
In 1962, Wakefield was found dead, lying in the doorway of his motel room near his parked car which had apparently been involved in a crash. The car was badly damaged; the seat stained with blood. The investigator said Wakefield had likely crashed into a utility pole and managed to drive back to his motel before collapsing.

== See also ==
- Vanderbilt Commodores
- List of Vanderbilt University people
