= 1924 Vanderbilt Commodores football team =

American college football season

1924 Vanderbilt Commodores football
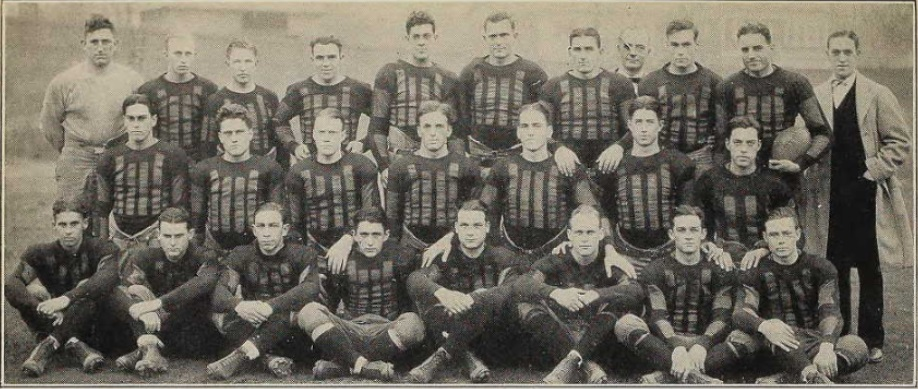
- Conference: Southern Conference, Southern Intercollegiate Athletic Association
- Record: 6–3–1 (3–3 SoCon, 0–1 SIAA)
- Head coach: Dan McGugin (20th season)
- Offensive scheme: Short punt
- Captain: Everett E. Kelly
- Home stadium: Dudley Field

Uniform
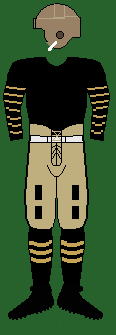

1924 Southern Conference football standings
	Conf.					Overall
Team	W		L		T	W		L		T
Alabama $	5	–	0	–	0	8	–	1	–	0
Florida	2	–	0	–	1	6	–	2	–	2
Georgia	5	–	1	–	0	7	–	3	–	0
Tulane	4	–	1	–	0	8	–	1	–	0
Washington and Lee	4	–	1	–	1	6	–	3	–	1
South Carolina	3	–	2	–	0	7	–	3	–	0
Sewanee *	3	–	2	–	0	6	–	4	–	0
Mississippi A&M	3	–	2	–	0	5	–	4	–	0
Virginia	3	–	2	–	0	5	–	4	–	0
Georgia Tech	3	–	2	–	1	5	–	3	–	1
Vanderbilt *	3	–	3	–	0	6	–	3	–	1
VPI	2	–	2	–	3	4	–	2	–	3
VMI	2	–	3	–	1	6	–	3	–	1
Kentucky	2	–	3	–	0	4	–	5	–	0
North Carolina	2	–	3	–	0	4	–	5	–	0
Auburn	2	–	4	–	1	4	–	4	–	1
Maryland	1	–	2	–	1	3	–	3	–	3
NC State	1	–	4	–	1	2	–	4	–	2
LSU	0	–	3	–	0	5	–	4	–	0
Ole Miss	0	–	3	–	0	4	–	5	–	0
Clemson	0	–	3	–	0	2	–	6	–	0
Tennessee	0	–	4	–	0	3	–	5	–	0
$ – Conference champion; * – co-member of SIAA

1924 Southern Intercollegiate Athletic Association football standings
	Conf.					Overall
Team	W		L		T	W		L		T
Centre +	1	–	0	–	0	5	–	1	–	1
Oglethorpe +	5	–	0	–	0	6	–	3	–	1
Mississippi College	2	–	0	–	1	2	–	5	–	1
Newberry	4	–	1	–	0	8	–	2	–	0
Mercer	4	–	1	–	1	5	–	3	–	2
Sewanee*	2	–	1	–	0	6	–	4	–	0
The Citadel	4	–	2	–	0	6	–	4	–	0
Louisville	2	–	1	–	0	3	–	4	–	1
Millsaps	1	–	1	–	0	3	–	5	–	1
Georgetown (KY)	1	–	1	–	0	1	–	4	–	0
Transylvania	1	–	2	–	0	6	–	2	–	0
Furman	1	–	2	–	0	5	–	5	–	0
Wofford	2	–	4	–	0	3	–	7	–	0
Howard (AL)	1	–	3	–	0	3	–	5	–	1
Presbyterian	1	–	3	–	0	1	–	6	–	1
Vanderbilt*	0	–	1	–	0	6	–	3	–	1
Louisiana College	0	–	1	–	0	0	–	1	–	0
Western Kentucky	0	–	2	–	0	4	–	6	–	0
Erskine	0	–	4	–	0	1	–	7	–	0
Chattanooga	0	–	5	–	0	1	–	7	–	1
+ – Conference co-champions; * – co-member of SoCon

The 1924 Vanderbilt Commodores football team represented Vanderbilt University in the 1924 Southern Conference football season. The 1924 season was Dan McGugin's 20th year as head coach. Members of the Southern Conference, the Commodores played six home games in Nashville, Tennessee, at Dudley Field and finished the season with a record of 6–3–1 (3–3 SoCon). Vanderbilt outscored its opponents 150–53. Fred Russell's Fifty Years of Vanderbilt Football dubs it "the most eventful season in the history of Vanderbilt football."

Highlights of the year include Vanderbilt's first win over a Northern school, defeating Minnesota 16–0, and its first win in Atlanta over Georgia Tech since 1906, from a single drop-kick by consensus All-American Hek Wakefield. Georgia also beat Vanderbilt for the first time in twenty-seven years, as did Sewanee for the first time in ten as well as last time. On November 9, Vanderbilt played the school's 279th game and defeated Mississippi A&M 18–0 for the 200th win in the school's football program.

== Schedule ==
Date	Opponent	Site	Result	Attendance	Source
September 27	Henderson-Brown*	Dudley Field; Nashville, TN	W 13–0		
October 4	Birmingham–Southern*	Dudley Field; Nashville, TN	W 61–0		
October 11	Quantico Marines*	Dudley Field; Nashville, TN	T 13–13	16,000	
October 18	at Tulane	Second Tulane Stadium; New Orleans, LA	L 13–21	13,000	
October 25	Georgia	Dudley Field; Nashville, TN (rivalry)	L 0–3		
November 1	Auburn	Dudley Field; Nashville, TN	W 13–0		
November 8	Mississippi A&M	Dudley Field; Nashville, TN	W 18–0		
November 15	at Georgia Tech	Grant Field; Atlanta, GA (rivalry)	W 3–0		
November 22	at Minnesota*	Memorial Stadium; Minneapolis, MN	W 16–0	16,000–18,500	
November 27	Sewanee	Dudley Field; Nashville, TN (rivalry)	L 0–16	18,500	
*Non-conference game

== Before the season ==
"This was the most eventful season in the history of Vanderbilt football...The Commodores rose from the depths of despair to the heights of joy, then back again. It was the year of a thousand thrills, a thousand sobs" says Fred Russell of the year that was 1924. The Commodores had a stout freshman team the year before, and had just won its third Southern title in a row. Many stayed from the 1923 team, including two All-American ends in Lynn Bomar and Hek Wakefield. Bomar played halfback this year, and was expected to receive All-American honors at that position by season's end. All-Southern players at halfback in Gil Reese, and on the line in Bob Rives and captain Tuck Kelly, also returned for the 1924 campaign.

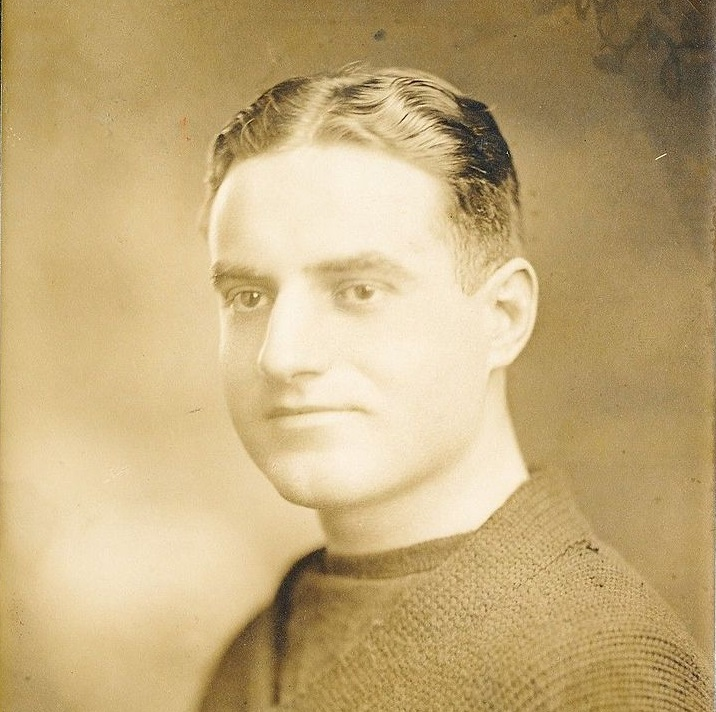
Captain Tuck Kelly

Instead of in Nashville as usual, Vanderbilt practiced at Camp Sycamore, some 40 miles outside of Nashville. The Commodores practiced there up until just a week before its first game. Vanderbilt had been scheduled to open the season against the Howard Bulldogs on September 27, but the sudden death of their coach led to Henderson-Brown taking their place.

== Game summaries ==
=== Week 1: Henderson-Brown ===
Week 1: Henderson-Brown at Vanderbilt

Team	1	2	3	4	Total
Henderson-Br.	0	0	0	0	0
• Vanderbilt	13	0	0	0	13

- Date: September 27
- Location: Dudley Field
  Nashville, Tennessee

Vanderbilt opened the season in the rain on September 27, 1924, against Henderson-Brown at Dudley Field in Nashville, winning by a score of 13–0. End Hek Wakefield scored both touchdowns. The first came after captain and guard Tuck Kelly blocked a punt, the other on a pass into the end zone from quarterback Nig Waller. Tom Ryan did well punting and plunging.

=== Week 2: Birmingham–Southern ===
In the second week of play, Gil Reese scored five touchdowns as Vanderbilt smothered the Birmingham–Southern Panthers 61–0. The score was not so expected, for the Panthers had held Auburn to merely a 7–0 victory the week before.

The Commodores beat Birmingham–Southern "on straight football and a simple pass." Bomar also had a punt return for a touchdown. Ralph McGill described Reese's day: "He stars. A man dashes at him and goes sprawling on the ground. There is another. A twist of the body and a step to the side and he is gone, left to lie on the sod and meditate on the fate that is his. Three or four men rush at him. There is a swirl of action, flying feet and diving bodies, and out of it—Reese running with the grace of a deer. Reese's action is never desperate. He never seems harassed or hurried. His spectacular runs are things of athletic beauty, There is no lost motion. It is perfect." Tackle Frank "Buddy" Cairns of the Panthers was given praise for his showing against Vanderbilt.

=== Week 3: Quantico Marines ===
Week 3: Quantico Marines at Vanderbilt

Team	1	2	3	4	Total
Quantico Marines	6	0	0	7	13
Vanderbilt	6	7	0	0	13

- Date: October 11
- Location: Dudley Field
  Nashville, Tennessee
- Game attendance: 16,000

The Vanderbilt Commodores and the United States Marine Corps "Devil Dogs" football team from the Quantico Marine Corps Base in Virginia, "one of the finest, best-trained group of football players ever to appear in Nashville" battled to a hard-fought tie of 13–13 in week three. The Marines got the upper-hand for three quarters.

In the first quarter, the Quantico Marines' halfback Boots Groves fumbled the ball at the 16-yard line, picked up by Lynn Bomar who ran the 84 yards for the touchdown.

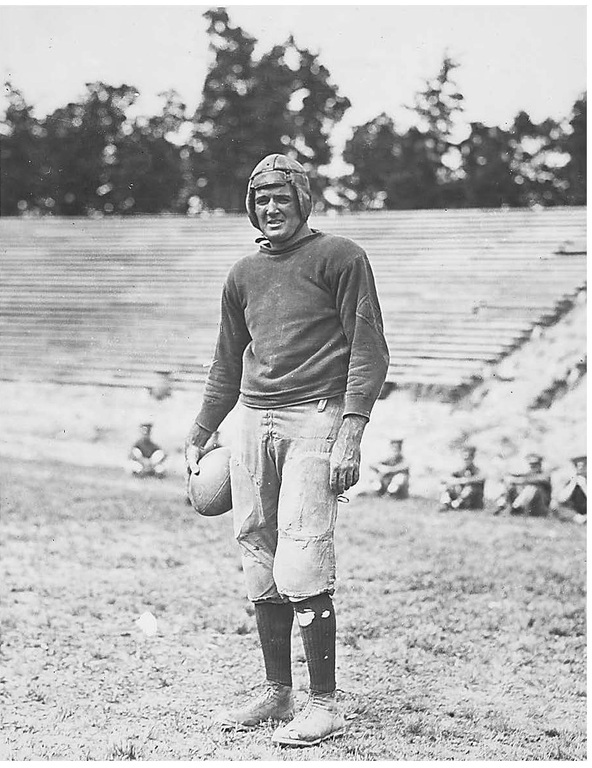
Frank Goettge.

A newspaper account describes the play, "It was Lynn Bomar's gigantic figure that broke up what looked like a Marine cakewalk. After receiving the kickoff, the Marines drove steadily to Vanderbilt's 10-yard line as Goettge repeatedly completed short passes. At the 10, Groves dropped back. The pass from center was low. He missed it. He reached for the ball. It trickled off his fingers. The Commodores were boring in. Wakefield was in there. Then Bomar came charging through. He picked up the ball and with a twist was out of Groves' grasp. He came out of the bunch with a long, charging run. Then he seemed a little undecided. One fleeting glance behind him and he struck out. Up came his free arm to brush off his headgear. His thin, yellow hair stood out. On he swept like a thundercloud of vengeance across the goal. Bedlam broke loose."

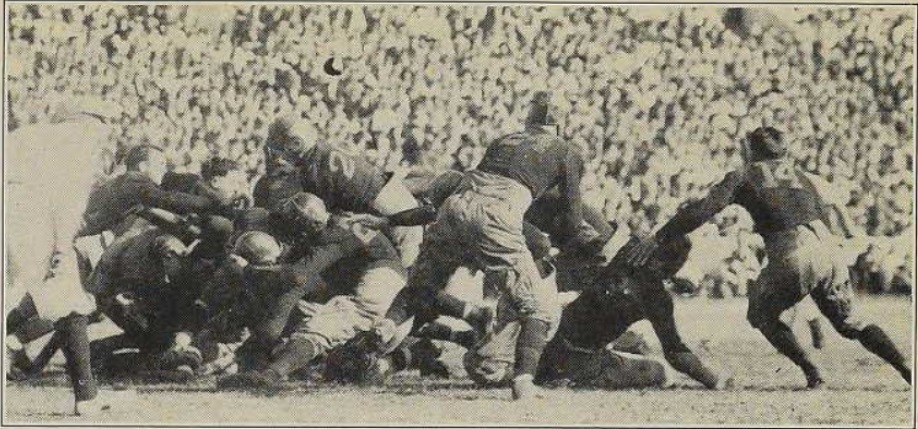
Picture from the game. Wakefield is far right.

The Marines gained from an exchange of punts after this, and started a drive from their own 25-yard line which ended in a touchdown. Quantico captain and quarterback Frank Goettge and fullback Orville Neal starred on the drive. On fourth down, a pass to end Lawson Sanderson got the score. Vanderbilt then gained on a 59-yard drive of its own with a flurry of forward passes; as well as runs from Tom Ryan through the line and Gil Reese around it. Reese eventually ran into the end zone. The point after was good.

To open the second half, Nig Waller fumbled the kickoff. The Marines recovered and were already near the goal. The Commodores' line held the Marines scoreless inside the 10-yard line on three separate occasions, mostly due to Hek Wakefield, Bob Ledyard, and Jess Keene. In the final period, the Marines got their touchdown. Goettge completed a long pass to Clarence Kyle, and then ran it himself down to the Commodores' 6-yard line. After a line play failed, a pass from Goettge to halfback Tom Henry scored a touchdown. Willis Ryckman kicked goal, and the game ended as a tie.

The Marines had two whole other teams worth of reserves, unlike Vanderbilt; namely from the Navy Scouting Reel and Mohawk Athletic Club, one of which played in the second half of this contest. Commodore captain Tuck Kelly was injured in this game. He sat on the bench the rest of the year except for five minutes of the Tulane game the next week.

Starting lineup for Vanderbilt against Quantico Marines: Wakefield (left end), Rives (left tackle), Lawrence (left guard), Keene (center), Kelly (right guard), Walker (right tackle), McKibbon (right end), Waller (quarterback), Reese (left halfback), Bomar (right halfback), Ryan (fullback).

=== Week 4: at Tulane ===
Week 4: Vanderbilt at Tulane

Team	1	2	3	4	Total
Vanderbilt	6	7	0	0	13
• Tulane	7	0	7	7	21

- Date: October 18
- Location: Tulane Stadium
  New Orleans
- Game attendance: 13,000
- Referee: Graves (Illinois)

In the fourth game, Vanderbilt lost to the Tulane Green Wave in a "heart-breaker", 21–13. Vanderbilt got the best of Tulane in the first half, with a strong second half from the Green Wave deciding the game. A relaying of the first downs details the shift in the game. Vanderbilt got 18 first downs to Tulane's 16, and Vandy made 14 of those in the first half while Tulane made 3. The backfield of Tulane was the shining feature of the game, particularly Lester Lautenschlaeger, Brother Brown, Peggy Flournoy, and Harvey Wilson.

The starting lineup for Vanderbilt against Tulane: Cargile (left end), Rives (left tackle), Lawrence (left guard), Ledyard (center), Bryan (right guard), Walker (right tackle), Wakefield (right end), N. Waller (quarterback), Bomar (left halfback), Reese (right halfback), Ryan (fullback).

=== Week 5: Georgia ===
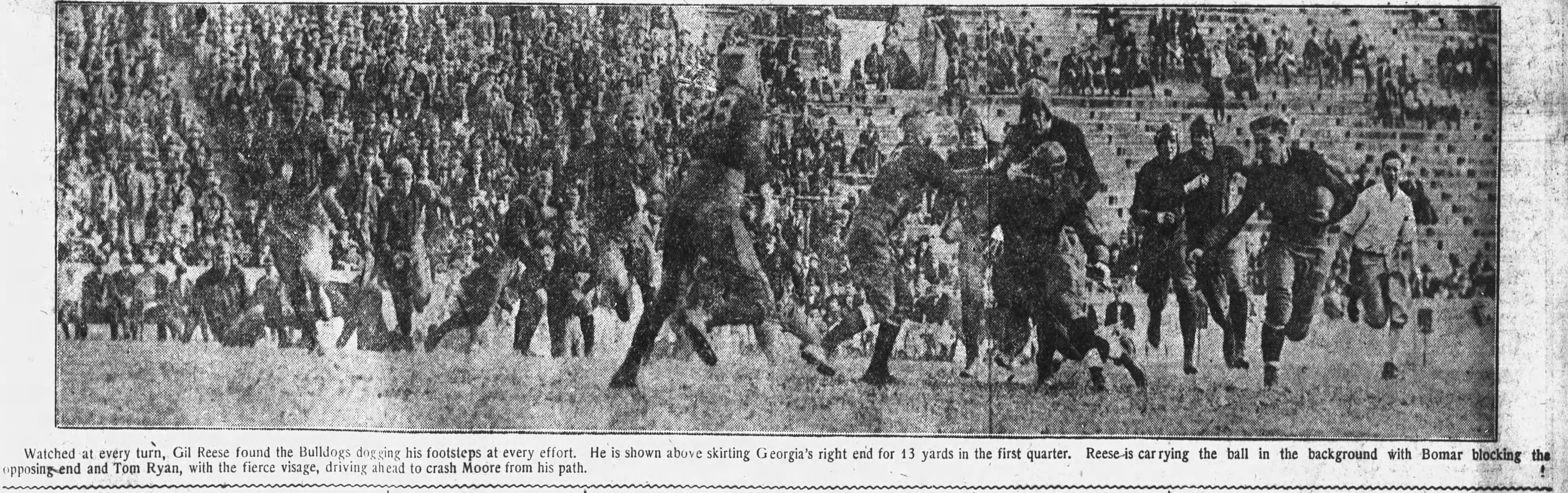
Gil Reese on a 13-yard run in the first quarter

Week 5: Georgia at Vanderbilt

Team	1	2	3	4	Total
• Georgia	0	0	0	3	3
Vanderbilt	0	0	0	0	0

- Date: October 25
- Location: Dudley Field
  Nashville, Tennessee
- Referee: Ed Finlay

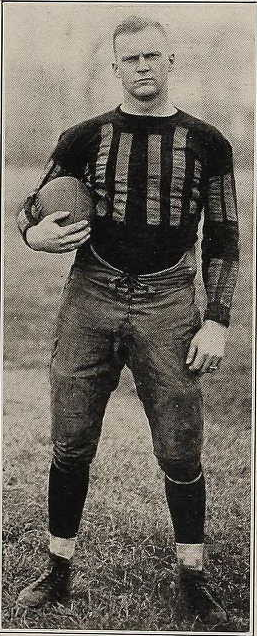
Lynn Bomar

In the fifth week of play, Vanderbilt lost to the Georgia Bulldogs by a score of 3–0. The first victory for Georgia over Vanderbilt in twenty-seven "long years," having failed to win the last seven matches. The Commodores did well in the first quarter, but never threatened again after that. Georgia had 12 first downs to Vandy's 7, and the Bulldogs gained 284 yards to the Commodores' 128. The furthest the Commodores penetrated was to Georgia's 31-yard line. Thrice the Bulldogs got to within Vanderbilt's 10-yard line, but all three times the Vanderbilt defense stiffened and prevented a score. Bulldog quarterback and later Chattanooga Mocs coach "Scrappy" Moore made the drop-kick which broke the scoreless tie. The Bulldogs were coached by George "Kid" Woodruff.

In the second quarter, Georgia, back Buster Kilpatrick ran from the 5 to the 45-yard line. Runs from Ike Sherlock and a 20-yard run by Kilpatrick got the ball to the 6-yard line. Three runs failed, and an attempted pass on fourth down was grounded. Another drive, highlighted by the run by Sherlock of 23 yards, got Georgia to the 7-yard line. Here again the Commodores stood tall and stopped the Bulldogs going any further. On the ensuing series was the short bright spot for Vanderbilt. Waller slung the ball 30 yards to Hek Wakefield, who ran for 20 more yards before being tackled. A pass from Gil Reese was then intercepted by Thomason to quell the threat. The Bulldogs gained more in the second quarter than the Commodores did all game.

1923 consensus All-American Lynn Bomar suffered an injury this day which ended his career with Vanderbilt football. A kick to the chin from a cleat gave him a severe brain hemorrhage, leaving him with half of his body paralyzed for two days. It was figured he would never play football again. "Not a player on the team could talk of Bomar's injury without tears coming to his eyes." The next year, he defied the odds and play professional football in the inaugural season for the New York Giants, leaving after 1926 from a different injury.

Scrappy Moore made the 32-yard drop-kick to seal the game for the Bulldogs in the fourth quarter. The ball just passed over the cross bar. Georgia's passing game got them again to Vanderbilt's 10-yard line when the game ended. Vanderbilt made just one first down in the second half. Of its 30-second half yards, 23 came on a desperate pass near the end. Guard Zach Coles was discovered on this day, coming in for McKibbon he single-handedly stopped one of Georgia's goal line threats.

The starting lineup for Vanderbilt against Georgia: Wakefield (left end), Rives (left tackle), Lawrence (left guard), Keene (center), Ledyard (right guard), Walker (right tackle), McKibbon (right end), Waller (quarterback), Bomar (left halfback), Reese (right halfback), Ryan (fullback).

=== Week 6: Auburn ===
Week 6: Auburn at Vanderbilt

Team	1	2	3	4	Total
Auburn	0	0	0	0	0
• Vanderbilt	7	0	6	0	13

- Date: November 1
- Location: Dudley Field
  Nashville, Tennessee

On November 1, 1924, the Vanderbilt Commodores defeated Auburn at Dudley Field 13–0. Vanderbilt's passing game was employed often to great success. The Commodores "regained much of their lost confidence this game." Both Vanderbilt touchdowns were due to end Hek Wakefield, who acted as captain with recent injuries suffered by both Tuck Kelly and Lynn Bomar. Kelly was resting injuries he had received in the Quantico Marines game. Auburn was coached by Boozer Pitts.

In the first quarter, Wakefield picked up a blocked punt and ran 40 yards for the touchdown. A long pass in the second quarter from end Fred McKibbon to Hek Wakefield resulted in Hek running it in for the touchdown. McKibbon connected with Waller on another long pass in the third quarter, but the Auburn defense held strong.

The starting lineup was: Wakefield (left end), Walker (left tackle), Bryan (left guard), Keene(center), Lawrence (right guard), Rives (right tackle), McKibbon (right end), G. Waller (quarterback), Reese (left halfback), Hendrix (right halfback), Ryan (fullback).

=== Week 7: Mississippi A & M ===
Week 7: Mississippi A & M at Vanderbilt

Team	1	2	3	4	Total
Miss. A & M	0	0	0	0	0
• Vanderbilt	6	6	6	0	18

- Date: November 8
- Location: Dudley Field
  Nashville, Tennessee
- Referee: Harry Springer (Penn)

The Vanderbilt Commodores beat the Mississippi A & M Aggies in the seventh week of play 18–0. Coach Lewie Hardage had come back from scouting the Aggies, giving the sense the Commodores were sure to lose. Mississippi A & M gave Tulane its only loss this year. The game was mired with rain, mud, and many fumbles. Vanderbilt coach Dan McGugin, who was in the hospital with pneumonia, dressed and left his bed to meet with his team between halves. The Aggies were coached by Earl Abell.

During the first quarter, Gil Reese caught a punt from the Aggies' halfback Patty and ran 54 yards for a touchdown behind excellent blocking. The try was missed. In the second quarter, James Walker recovered a fumble on the Aggies' 20-yard line, and fullback Tom Ryan plowed through the line multiple times, eventually getting a touchdown.

The Commodores blocked a punt in the third quarter at the Aggies' 20-yard line. The fifth play of the drive was a touchdown run from Tom Ryan. The final quarter was a punting duel, with the ball largely in Mississippi A & M territory and the punts of Ryan starring. The Aggies punter, Patty, did well all over as well. Gil Reese's running through broken fields was also cited as a positive feature of Vanderbilt's play that day. Bob Rives was the star of the Commodores line at tackle. The Aggies did not complete a single pass, nor make a single first down. Vanderbilt's yearbook, The Commodore said of the game that it "proved conclusively that the 1923 tie game was due to the mud."

The starting lineup for Vanderbilt against Mississippi A & M: Wakefield (left end), Rives (left tackle), Coles (left guard), Keene (center), Bryan (right guard), Walker (right tackle), McKibbon (right end), Cargile (quarterback), Reese (left halfback), Hendrix (right halfback), Ryan (fullback).

=== Week 8: at Georgia Tech ===
Week 8: Vanderbilt at Georgia Tech

Team	1	2	3	4	Total
• Vanderbilt	3	0	0	0	3
Georgia Tech	0	0	0	0	0

- Date: November 15
- Location: Grant Field
  Atlanta

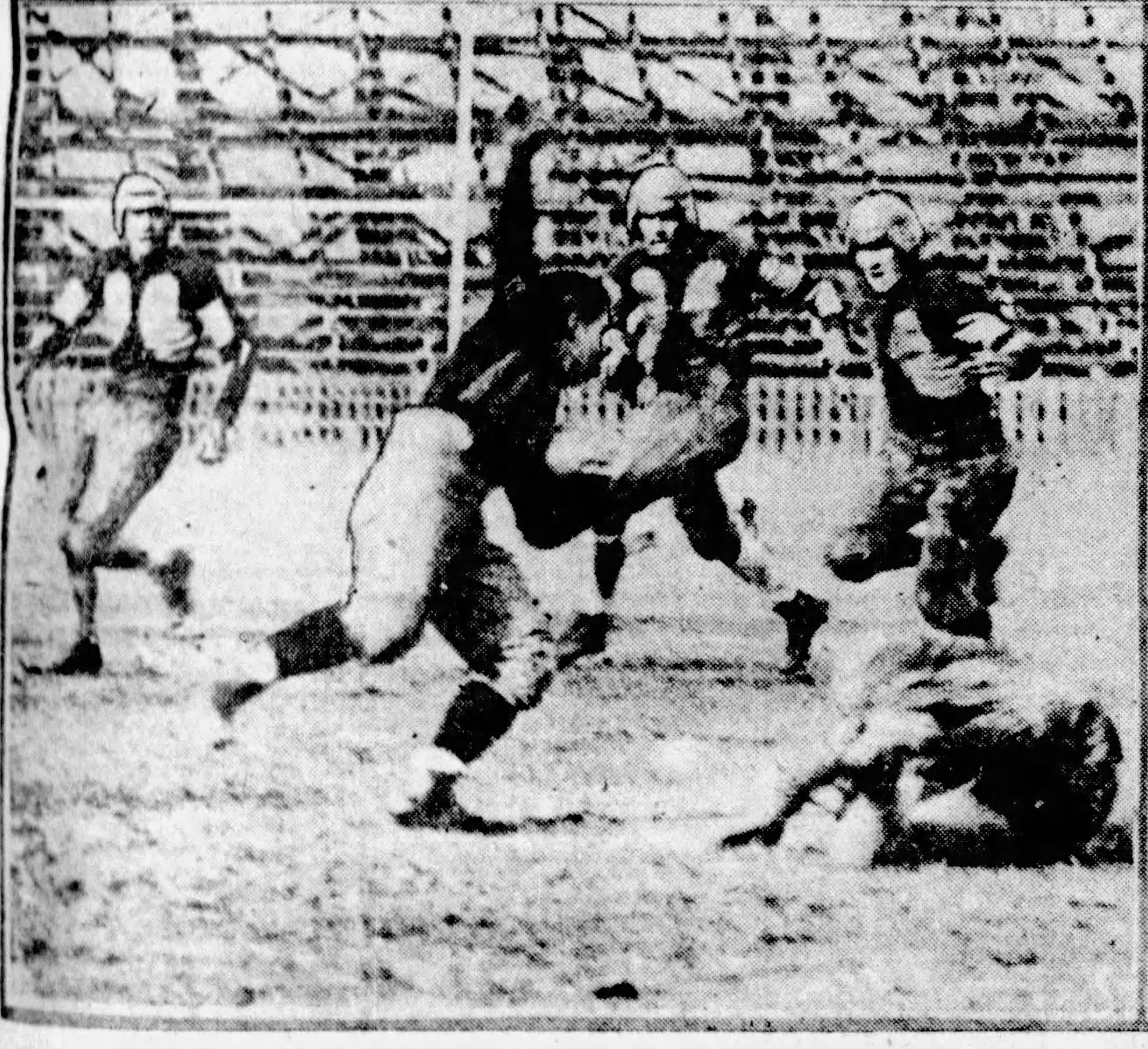
Gil Reese fighting for an opening vs. four Georgia Tech players

On November 15, the Vanderbilt Commodores traveled to Atlanta to play the Georgia Tech Golden Tornado at Grant Field. Georgia Tech was coached by William Alexander. The Commodores were followed by the largest crowd ever to accompany Vanderbilt on a trip, with five special sections. The lone score of the game could largely be credited to halfback Gil Reese. Vanderbilt elected to start the game with the wind at its back, hoping for an edge in punts which would lead to good field position early. Reese caught one of these punts in these exchanges on the fly and, noticing both of Tech's ends blocked to the ground, raced to within striking distance of the end zone. From there, Hek Wakefield made a drop kick. Wakefield was the star of the game; "He was death on returning punts and when he started around the ends the Tech stars groaned", recalls one account.

Georgia Tech's one chance to score came when fullback Douglas Wycoff missed a kick low, partially blocked by Vanderbilt. Hendrix attempted to recover but missed, and Georgia Tech retained possession at the 4-yard line. On first down, a snap from center missed Wycoff, and Vanderbilt fullback Tom Ryan recovered the ball at the 15-yard line, and later punted it away to safety. The game was a defensive scrap the rest of the way.

Gil Reese gained −15 yards rushing, and Wycoff was stopped all game. Bip Farnsworth was the Tornado's lone consistent ground gainer. The punting battle between Douglas Wycoff and Tom Ryan was one of the few noted features of the game. It was the first win for Vanderbilt in Atlanta since 1906. The Commodores used a single substitute, Fatty Lawrence.

The starting lineup was Wakefield (left end), Rives (left tackle), Coles (left guard), Keene (center), Bryan (right guard), Walker (right tackle), McKibbon (right end), Waller (quarterback), Reese (left halfback), Hendrix (right halfback), Ryan (fullback).

=== Week 9: at Minnesota ===
Week 9: Vanderbilt at Minnesota

Team	1	2	3	4	Total
• Vanderbilt	6	0	10	0	16
Minnesota	0	0	0	0	0

- Date: November 22
- Location: Memorial Stadium
  Minneapolis
- Game attendance: 16,000–18,500
- Referee: J. H. Nichols (Oberlin)

Vanderbilt traveled north to play an intersectional match with the Minnesota Golden Gophers. Minnesota in the previous week beat the defending national champion, Red Grange led Illinois. The Gophers were heavy favorites. Vanderbilt gave Minnesota its worst loss of the year, winning 16–0.

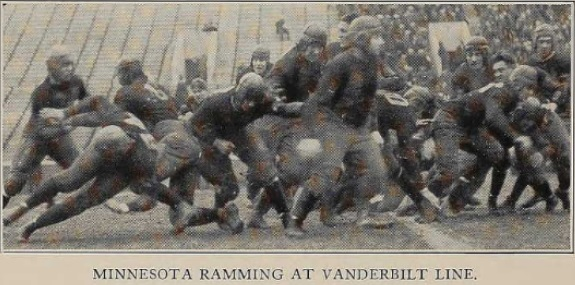
Minnesota charging Vanderbilt's line.

A newspaper account reflects this, "The Gophers were badly outplayed during the four quarters." The Commodores made not one substitution in their first defeat of a northern school. "It was the most glorious victory in the annals of Vanderbilt and Southern football" said the Vanderbilt yearbook. The Golden Gophers were coached by William Spaulding.

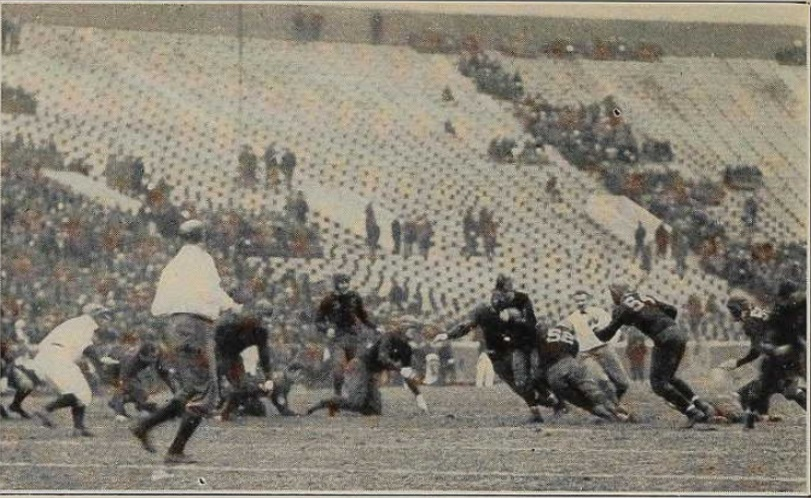
Gil Reese being tackled during the game.

The first touchdown drive ended when Tom Ryan broke through a hole created by Bob Rives, finishing a 63-yard march. A pass from Ox McKibbon to Gil Reese, and off tackle runs by Ryan, Reese, and Neil Cargile put the Commodores in the position to score. Vanderbilt did not get a single first down in the second quarter.

In the second half, Wakefield kicked a 27-yard field goal. Two forward passes help Vanderbilt reach the spot. Later, McKibbon threw a pass which gained 18 yards, and then threw another one of 10 yards, to Reese, who ran in the score. "It was the best coached team we saw this year", said the Minnesota newspapermen. Blinkey Horn, sportswriter for the Nashville Tennessean, reported the jubilance following the win:

Those strife scorned but undying traditions of the Southland brought Vanderbilt to a 16-0 triumph over Minnesota in Memorial Stadium here today. After more than half a century, the charge of Pickett's men at Gettysburg was re-enacted. The same matchless courage which guided the ragged Rebel band up those shell-ton heights, led the Commodores to conquest.

It was the first victory of a Vanderbilt eleven ever attained across the line which divorces Dixie from the North. Mirrored here on Yankee sod today was that unconquerable spirit which enabled forefathers of the Commodores back in '63 to jest through a tempest of musketry and canister and grape.

Vanderbilt won because its play reflected all the legends, all the chivalry, all the courage of Southern history. Because its spirit never for a second faltered. Because it grinned at frowning barriers and went through. Because its valor could not be scorned by the flame of that attack which burned Illinois to a crisp a week ago. The team, which stopped Red Grange, was stopped by a spirit immune to any ingredient of defeat.

Wakefield chose his plays with excellent judgement. His tackling forced the Gophers frequently to take time out, and he repeatedly threw Minnesota back for losses. There is a sketchy chronicle of the score incubation. But it was the Commodore defense which stripped naked the laurel tree to adorn Bob Rives, Neil Cargile, and all the rest. Bob Rives climbed to the crux many times in the past to bring back decoration from gridiron gods. His other upward journeys were trips to the crest of a molehill. This day he reached Mt. Everest.

Outplayed were the Gophers. Bill Spaulding, Minnesota mentor, graciously conceded that. But above all, the Gophers were outfought. The Gophers were out-kicked and out-passed. Tom Ryan booted his to the loftiest heights his toe has ever led him. Fred McKibbon left Minneapolis dizzy with his crafty timing of aerial shots.

All restraint fled yesterday afternoon as a telegraph wire flashed to Vanderbilt Stadium the news that a Commodore team had won its most glorious victory of a decade. Man became monkey. He sprang into the air, and wrapped his prehensile tail around an imaginary coconut tree, and tried to scream the stars into alarm.

Vanderbilt, the under-favored, became Commodore the triumph, the king of all sons, charted or uncharted. Vanderbilt had won! Oh, boy! Those were just the 4,500 who came to the stadium and volunteered heroically to stand by the old ship, sink or float. When the news flashed through the streets, 123,000 men, women, and children took the cry. This is the directory census of the Nashville directory. That is how many peopled joined in the mad hallelujah. An extravagant estimate? But last night even Davidson County wasn't big enough to dam the surging emotions of a populace gone victory mad.

College hall, out on Vanderbilt campus, it an old historic building. This stone foundation has withstood the cries of victory and the groans of defeat for, lo, these many years. But last night its old firm foundation faced a new crisis. Hundreds of its undergraduates, post-graduates, and non-graduates massed in front of its portals with song such as never known, and in reparation for a parade that will be remembered here long after other parades will have been forgotten.

Starting lineup for Vanderbilt against Minnesota: Wakefield (left end), Rives (left tackle), Lawrence (left guard), Keene (center), Coles (right guard), Walker (right tackle), McKibbon (right end), Cargile (quarterback), Reese (left halfback), Hendrick (right halfback), Ryan (fullback).

=== Week 10: Sewanee ===
Week 10: Sewanee at Vanderbilt

Team	1	2	3	4	Total
• Sewanee	7	0	0	9	16
Vanderbilt	0	0	0	0	0

- Date: November 27
- Location: Dudley Field
  Nashville, Tennessee
- Game attendance: 18,500
- Referee: Harry Springer (Penn)

In the annual contest between Vanderbilt and the Sewanee Tigers on Thanksgiving Day, Sewanee won for the first time in a decade by the score of 16–0. The student newspaper The Sewanee Purple labeled it "The Greatest Victory for Sewanee in Its Thirty-one Years of Football History." Vanderbilt coach Dan McGugin stated "Sewanee played a brilliant, sustained game. It was her day all the way." Michigan coach Fielding Yost said of the game, "It was one of those days when everything you try goes wrong and everything the other fellow tries goes right. Sewanee played great football." Gil Reese was relatively controlled and Bob Rives' line play was adequately challenged. Gil Reese and Fatty Lawrence starred for the Commodores. Sewanee's backfield of captain Harris, Gibbons, Barker, and Mahoney "clicked to perfection" and its line received much praise as well. It's the last time Sewanee has beaten Vanderbilt.

The starting lineup for Vanderbilt against Sewanee: Wakefield (left end), Rives (left tackle), Lawrence (left guard), Keene (center), Coles (right guard), Walker (right tackle), McKibbon (right end), Cargile (quarterback), Reese (left halfback), Hendrix (right halfback), Ryan (fullback).

== Awards and honors ==
Hek Wakefield was consensus All-America. Gil Reese selected All-American by Norman E. Brown. Wakefield, Reese, and Bob Rives were all selected All-Southern.

== Personnel ==
=== Coaching staff ===
- Dan McGugin (Michigan '03), head coach
- Josh Cody (Vanderbilt '19), assistant coach
- Lewie Hardage (Vanderbilt '12), backfield coach
- Tom Zerfoss (Vanderbilt '19), assistant and freshman coach
- Ed Blackman, manager

=== Varsity letterwinners ===
==== Line ====
Number	Player	Position	Games started	Hometown	Prep school	Height	Weight	Age
23	Kenneth Bryan	Guard			Hume-Fogg H. S.			
13	Zach Coles	Guard						
24	Jesse Keene	Center			Trousdale County H. S.			
1	Tuck Kelly	Guard		Whitesville, Kentucky	University of Kentucky	6'0"	170	26
	James Lancaster	End						
19	Fatty Lawrence	Guard		Nashville, Tennessee	Hume-Fogg H.S.	5'7"	195	21
3	Paul Lindsay	Guard		Jacksonville, Florida	Duval H.S.			
27	Bob Ledyard	Tackle						
28	Ox McKibbon	End						
8	Bob Rives	Tackle		Hopkinsville, Kentucky	Hopkinsville H.S.	6'1"	200	21
10	Rayford Reid	Center						
34	Bo Rowland	End		Arkadelphia, Arkansas	Arkadelphia H.S			
12	James Stuart	Tackle						
14	Hek Wakefield	End		Petersburg, Tennessee	Fitzgerald and Clarke School			
22	James Walker	Tackle		Birmingham, Alabama				
	Charles Whitnel	End		Fulton, Kentucky				

==== Backfield ====
Number	Player	Position	Games started	Hometown	Prep school	Height	Weight	Age
35	Nolan Barnes	Fullback						
7	Lynn Bomar	Halfback		Gallatin, Tennessee	Fitzgerald and Clarke School	6'1"	200	23
5	Neil Cargile	Quarterback						
16	Bill Hendrix	Halfback						
27	Rufus W. "Dub" Orr	Quarterback						
11	Gil Reese	Halfback		Tupelo, Mississippi	Tupelo H.S.		155	
6	Tom Ryan	Fullback		Houston, Texas	Central H.S	6'1"	190	
4	Red Sanders	Halfback		Asheville, North Carolina	Riverside Military Academy			
9	George Waller	Quarterback		Bessemer, Alabama	Bessemer H.S.			
29	Nig Waller	Quarterback		Bessemer, Alabama	Bessemer H.S.			
32	Jack Yearwood	Quarterback						
20	Hoyle Young	Quarterback						

=== Scoring leaders ===
Player	Touchdowns	Extra points	Field goals	Points
Gil Reese	8	0	0	48
Hek Wakefield	4	10	2	40
Tom Ryan	5	0	0	30
Bill Hendrix	2	1	0	13
Lynn Bomar	2	0	0	12
Bo Rowland	1	1	0	7
Total	22	12	2	150

=== Depth chart ===
The following chart provides a visual depiction of Vanderbilt's lineup during the 1924 season with games started at the position reflected in parentheses. The chart mimics a short punt formation while on offense, with the quarterback under center.

LE
Hek Wakefield (5)
Neil Cargile (1)
Bo Rowland (0)

LT	LG	C	RG	RT
Bob Rives (6)	Fatty Lawrence (5)	Jesse Keene (5)	Zach Coles (2)	Jim Walker (6)
Bob Ledyard (0)	Zach Coles (1)	Bob Ledyard (1)	Kenneth Bryan (2)	James Stuart (0)
	Paul Lindsay (0)	Rayford Reid (0)	Tuck Kelly (1)	
			Bob Ledyard (1)	

RE
Ox McKibbon (5)
James Lancaster (0)
Charles Whitnel (0)

QB
Nig Waller (1)
George Waller
Neil Cargile (1)
Dub Orr (0)
Jack Yearwood (0)

LHB	RHB
Gil Reese (4)	Bill Hendrix (3)
Lynn Bomar (2)	Gil Reese (2)
Red Sanders (0)	Lynn Bomar (1)

FB
Tom Ryan (6)
Nolan Barnes (0)
Hoyle Young (0)

-

== Bibliography ==
- Traughber, Bill (2011). Vanderbilt Football: Tales of Commodore Gridiron History. The History Press. ISBN 978-1-60949-423-0.
- Woodruff, Fuzzy (1928). A History of Southern Football 1890–1928. Vol. 3.
