= Everett E. Kelley =

American football player and physician (1898–1983)

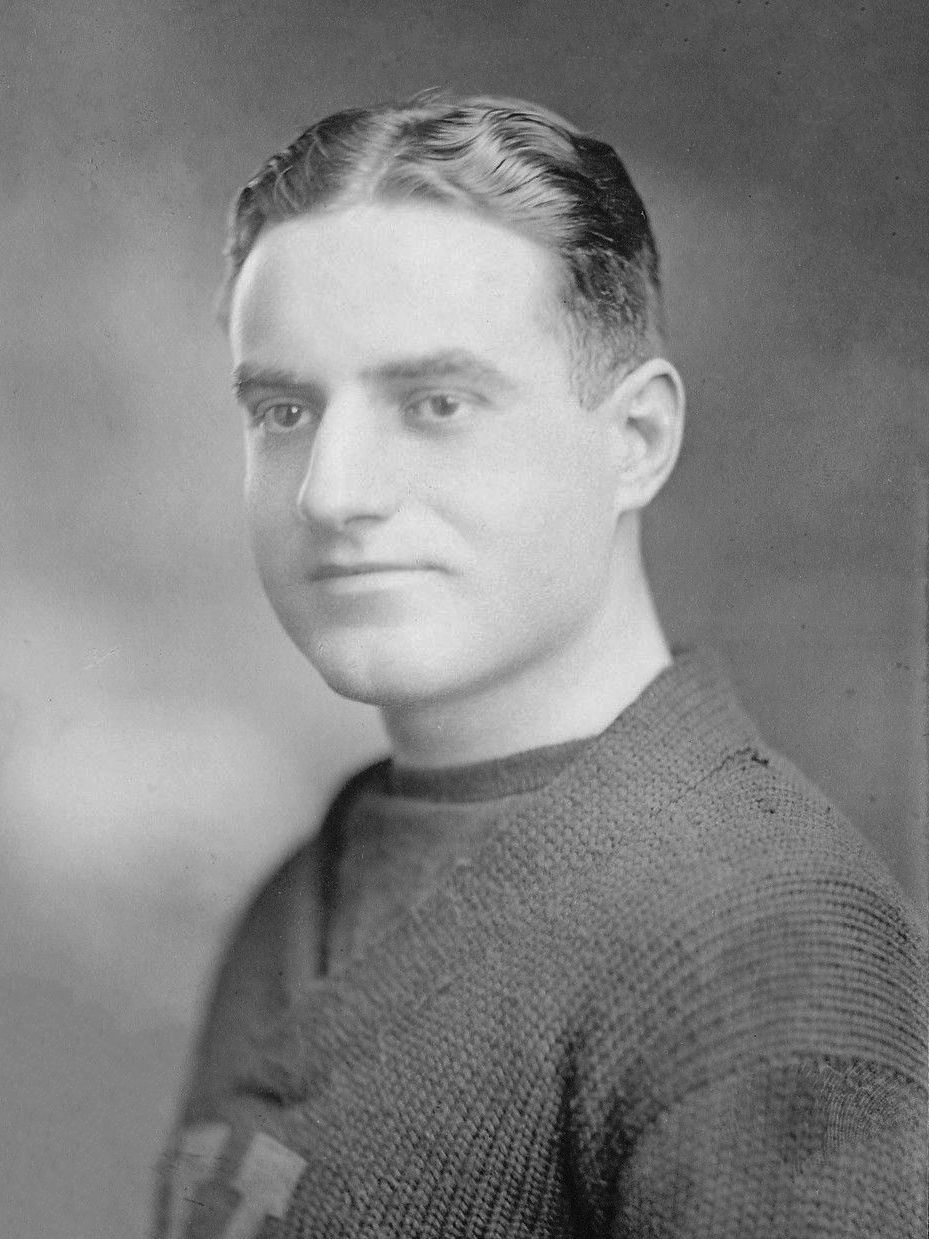
- Kelley c. 1923

No. 13; 1
- Positions: Guard, center
- Class: 1924

Personal information
- Born: January 8, 1898; Whitesville, Kentucky, U.S.
- Died: August 15, 1983 (aged 85); Marietta, Georgia, U.S.
- Listed height: 6 ft 0 in (1.83 m)
- Listed weight: 170 lb (77 kg)

Career information
- College: Kentucky (1915; 1918–1919); Vanderbilt (1922–1924)

Awards and highlights
- SoCon championship (1922, 1923); All-Southern (1922, 1923)

Everett Edward "Tuck" Kelley (January 8, 1898 – August 15, 1983) was an American college football player and physician. He also served in the Navy during both World Wars, eventually as a commander. As a football player, Kelley was an All-Southern guard for the Vanderbilt Commodores football team of Vanderbilt University. As a physician, he was once the surgeon at the Presbyterian Hospital of the City of Chicago.

== Early life ==
Everett Edward Kelley was born January 8, 1898, in Whitesville, Kentucky, to Charles Alphonzo Kelley and Mary Alice Ralph. His father was a farmer and a service station operator.

=== University of Kentucky ===
Kelley played for the Kentucky Wildcats football teams of the University of Kentucky, selected for All-Kentucky teams in an era dominated by Centre. (Note: Centre College star "Hump" Tanner was from nearby Owensboro.) He was elected treasurer of the freshman class.

=== Vanderbilt University ===
Kelley attended medical school at Vanderbilt, where he was a member of Alpha Omega Alpha. He started at guard for Dan McGugin's Vanderbilt football teams from 1922 to 1924. He was a prominent member of Commodores teams that compiled a win–loss–tie record of 20–2–3 (.860) over his three years, and won two conference titles.

==== 1922 ====
Kelley transferred to Vanderbilt in 1922, having formerly played center for the Kentucky Wildcats. Tuck was a starter for the scoreless tie with Michigan at the dedication of Dudley Field. After the season, he was selected for Billy Evans's All-Southern team; his "Southern Honor Roll."

==== 1923 ====
The rematch with the Michigan Wolverines at Ferry Field in 1923, saw Michigan win a bitterly fought contest 3 to 0. Michigan went on to have an undefeated season, and is one of the teams to claim a national title in '23. After the game, the referee McDonald approached Kelley and told him, "You are the first individual I've complimented after a game in which I officiated, but I want to tell you that I never saw a better guard than you are." One of the four touchdowns by Gil Reese in the 35 to 7 victory over the Georgia Bulldogs was a 5-yard run behind Kelley. At the end of the year, Kelley was selected for the All-Southern squad. He was elected to captain the Commodores the next year.

==== 1924 ====
The 1924 team, captained by Kelley, was dubbed in Fred Russell's Fifty Years of Vanderbilt Football "the most eventful season in the history of Vanderbilt football." On opening day against Henderson-Brown, Vanderbilt won 13–0. One of Vandy's two scores came on a punt blocked by Kelley, recovered by Hek Wakefield. The third week of play saw the Commodores tie with the Quantico Marines by a score of 13–13. Kelley was injured in this game. He would sit on the bench the rest of the year except for five minutes of the Tulane game the next week. Lynn Bomar suffered a brain hemorrhage in the game against Georgia that year, and in the final game against Sewanee, Wakefield broke his leg. Thus as the season finished, three of Vanderbilt's All-Southern selections for 1923 sat on the bench.

== Personal ==
In June 1925, Kelley married the former Mary Palmer Wade. Kelley's son Everett Jr was also in the Navy as an aviator, and served in the Korean War. Kelley Sr. is buried in Section U, Site 377 at Marietta National Cemetery in Marietta, Georgia.
