= Lynn Bomar =

American football player and law enforcement official

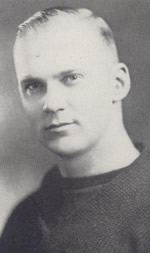
- Bomar ("the Blonde Bear") at Vanderbilt around 1922

No. 7
- Positions: End, tackle

Personal information
- Born: January 21, 1901; Bell Buckle, Tennessee, U.S.
- Died: June 11, 1964 (aged 63); Nashville, Tennessee, U.S.
- Listed height: 6 ft 1 in (1.85 m)
- Listed weight: 205 lb (93 kg)

Career information
- High school: Fitzgerald and Clarke School (Tullahoma, Tennessee)
- College: Vanderbilt

Career history
- New York Giants (1925–1926)

Awards and highlights
- Consensus All-American (1923); First-team All-American (1922); 3× All-Southern (1921, 1922, 1923); NFL All-Star team (1925); AP Southeast All-Time team (1920–1969 era); 1934 All-Time Vandy team.; Tennessee Sports Hall of Fame
- College Football Hall of Fame

Robert Lynn Bomar (January 21, 1901 – June 11, 1964) was an American National Football League (NFL) end. Bomar played college football, basketball and baseball for Vanderbilt University, following coach Wallace Wade and classmate Hek Wakefield there from prep school, and was a unanimous 1922 All-Southern selection and a consensus 1923 All-American selection in football. The latter season included a first-team All-American selection by Walter Camp, rare for a player in the South. A paralyzing injury ended Bomar's college career, but he quickly recovered and sat on the bench for all of his team's games. He played for the New York Giants in 1925 and 1926, retiring abruptly after a separate injury. Bomar was nicknamed "the Blonde Bear".

He had a later career in law enforcement. In his position as Tennessee's Commissioner of Public Safety and Patrol chief, Bomar supervised the ransacking of black households during the 1946 Columbia race riot. He was the warden of Tennessee State Prison from 1955 until his death, and oversaw several executions. In 1956, Bomar was the first Vanderbilt football player elected to the College Football Hall of Fame.

== Early life and education ==
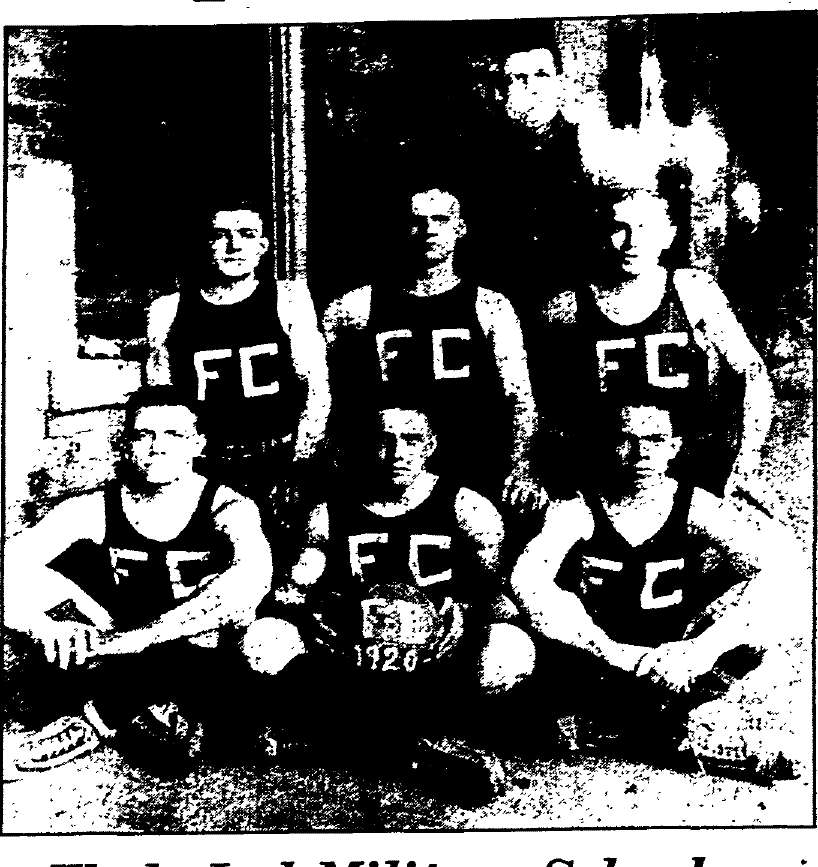
1920 Tennessee prep-school basketball champions; Wallace Wade is in the back, and Bomar is in the middle of the back row.

Bomar was born on January 21, 1901, in Bell Buckle, Tennessee, to Oliver Eugene Bomar, a blacksmith, and Elizabeth May McAdams. Vanderbilt records indicate that he spent part of his youth in Gallatin. Bomar attended Webb School in his native Bell Buckle, and spent a year at Castle Heights Military Academy.

=== Fitzgerald and Clarke ===
Bomar then attended preparatory school at the Fitzgerald and Clarke Military Academy in Tullahoma, Tennessee. In 1920, he was a member of teams which won the state prep-school football and basketball championships. In both sports Bomar played under head coach Wallace Wade. While Wade coached at Fitzgerald and Clarke, the school's overall football record was 15–2. With him on the football team was future college teammate and All-American Hek Wakefield. (Note: On March 14, 1922, while Bomar was in college, the school burned to the ground and was never rebuilt.)

== Vanderbilt University ==
=== Football ===
Bomar played for head coach Dan McGugin's Vanderbilt Commodores football team at Vanderbilt University from 1921 to 1924. Wallace Wade was hired as Vanderbilt football's assistant and line coach for 1921 and head coach of the basketball and baseball teams for 1922. Bomar and Wakefield enrolled at the school in the same class.

He was prominent on Commodore teams which compiled a win–loss–tie record of 26–5–4 (.800) and three straight conference titles during his four seasons. Bomar was an All-Southern and All-American selection in 1922 and 1923. In addition to playing end and tackle (offense and defense), he made the kickoffs. Bomar's play was described:

The Blonde Bear was one of the world's greatest football players, who never missed an open field block. When one considers he made Walter Camp's All-America team when he was backing up the line on defense and blocking and catching passes on offense, his greatness is realized.

[Bomar] plucked passes out of the ozone that seemed impossible to get, and then raced through the enemy like they were tied." Often he started games at fullback, shifted to halfback or end, and finished at tackle. In backing up the line, [he] hurled back all comers with the same savage vigor.

His favorite refrain to opponents was, "I hope you don't like it."

==== 1921 ====
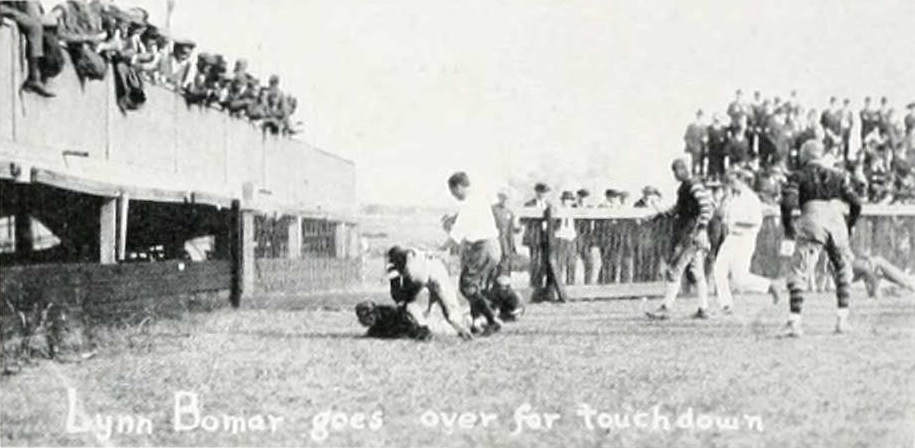
Bomar's touchdown against Alabama

During Bomar's freshman season at Vanderbilt, he was already a standout player as a starting fullback. In a game against the Longhorns at the Texas State Fair in Dallas, the Commodores won 20–0 after they were expected to lose by two touchdowns. Texas had been undefeated in 1920, winning the Southwest Conference. The 1921 squad was considered possibly the best in Longhorns history, and Vanderbilt football seemed to be in decline when Georgia Tech defeated the Commodores 44–0 the previous year. Dan McGugin gave a speech invoking late former Vanderbilt quarterback Irby Curry before the game. According to Edwin Pope's Football's Greatest Coaches, "The Texas game, sparked by McGugin's unforgettable oratory, was the big one; and Vandy got out of the year without a loss." Bomar scored on a 40-yard interception return for a touchdown in the fourth quarter, increasing the Commodore lead to two touchdowns. In the sixth game of the season, Vanderbilt defeated the Alabama Crimson Tide 14–0 at Birmingham. The victory was expected by insiders (then often called the "dope"), with Vanderbilt favored by two touchdowns. Early in the first quarter several runs by Jess Neely, a long pass from Neely to Tot McCullough and a 17-yard run by Neely brought the ball to the nine-yard line. After a run by Frank Godchaux, Bomar bucked over the line for a touchdown. The game against the Georgia Bulldogs decided the Southern Intercollegiate Athletic Association (SIAA) championship that season, with Bomar excelling at linebacker. "Georgia would have trampled Vanderbilt to atoms but for Lynn Bomar," wrote Nashville Tennessean sportswriter Blinkey Horn. "Lynn Bomar was the stellar performer of the game. In the first-half he made two-thirds of the tackles", and reportedly prevented five Georgia touchdowns that day. The Commodores tied the Bulldogs 7–7 on a fourth-quarter onside kick for a share of the SIAA title, finishing the season with a 7–0–1 record.

==== 1922 ====
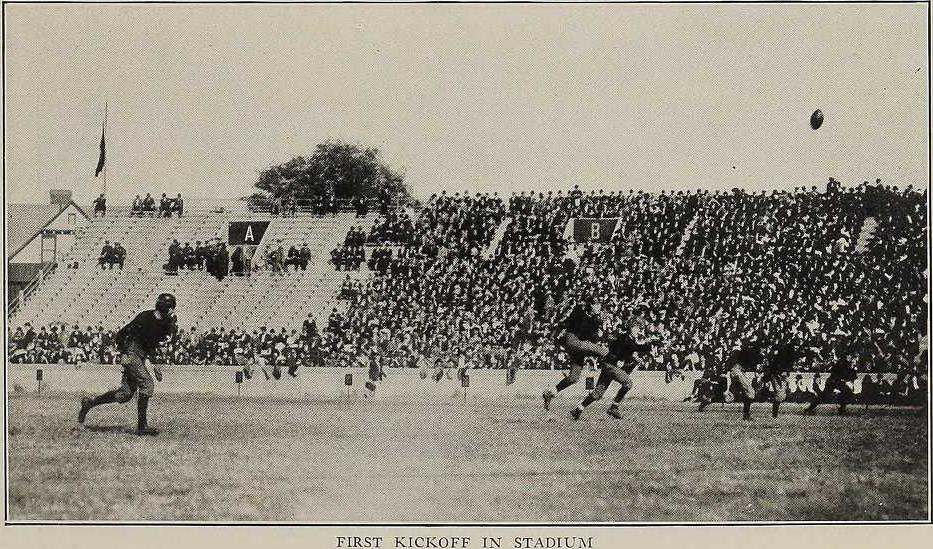
Bomar kicking off the dedication of Dudley Field against Michigan

Vanderbilt had its second straight undefeated season in 1922, with Bomar playing his preferred position at end. He was a starter in the scoreless tie with Michigan at the dedication of Dudley Field, spending much of the game tackling Michigan runners. According to the school yearbook, Bomar "tore through the Wolverine line constantly, and always emerged after a play on the far side of the defense" and the game included a goal line stand. Another account read, "Thousands of cheering Vanderbilt fans inspired the surge of center Alf Sharp, guard Gus Morrow, tackle Tex Bradford, and end Lynn Bomar, who stopped Michigan cold in four attempts." The next week against Texas at the Dallas State Fair, Vanderbilt won 20–10. Bomar made an interception and caught a 23-yard pass from Jess Neely, running 20 yards to set up a Gil Reese touchdown. Against the Tennessee Volunteers, he scored the second of two touchdowns on a short pass from Neely in a 14–6 victory.

Bomar's best offensive performance that year was against Georgia. Neely made a long pass from a few yards behind the line of scrimmage at the 45-yard line; Bomar caught it near the seven-yard line, and was tackled by Georgia halfback Loren Chester (Teany) Randall at around the three-yard line before Reese scored the touchdown. Neely and Bomar were among the best pass-receiver combinations in Vanderbilt history: "Bomar, unquestionably, was Vanderbilt's best receiver, snatching everything thrown at him."

A similar play in the game's second half scored another touchdown. Quarterback Doc Kuhn dropped back for a more than 40-yard touchdown pass to Bomar. The pass went 28 yards in the air, with Bomar running the rest of the way. Georgia running back Dave Collings tackled him as he crossed the goal line (injuring himself), and Bomar also made an interception in the 12–0 Vanderbilt victory. The season's final game, against Vanderbilt's oldest rival Sewanee, had a trick play by the Commodores. A fake run ended with Kuhn tossing the ball to Bomar, who was left open behind the defense and easily ran it in; Vanderbilt won, 26–0.

After the season, Bomar received first-team All-American honors from Frank G. Menke. He was also chosen a second-team All-American by Walter Camp, a third-team All-American by Walter Eckersall and appeared on Billy Evans' National Honor Roll. Bomar and Red Barron of Georgia Tech were the two unanimous All-Southern selections. Grantland Rice wrote the next year, "There was no better end in the country last fall" and Camp described Bomar:

Bomar, of Vanderbilt, is only shaded a little by two other ends, largely through the experienced gained by his rivals against stronger opposition. He weighs 200 pounds, is tremendously fast, and a hardy, defensive player. On attack he is able to pick the forward pass out of the air on the full run, and, running with a high-knee action quite like that of the redoubtable Ted Coy, if he cannot get by his man, runs him down and goes on over him, still on his feet.

==== 1923 ====
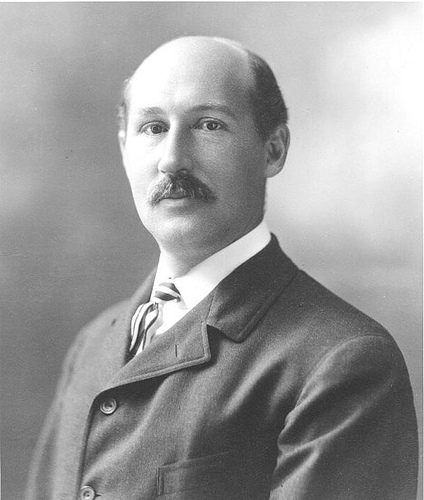
Bomar was one of the first Southern players, and the last, to receive first-team All-America honors from Walter Camp (pictured).

In 1923, assistant coach Wallace Wade was hired as head coach at Alabama and was replaced by former star tackle Josh Cody. A rematch against the Michigan Wolverines at Ferry Field was a 3–0 Vanderbilt loss, with consensus All-American center Jack Blott scoring Michigan's field goal. According to the Michigan Alumnus, Harry Kipke could not return punts for fear of fumbling; when he received the ball, Vanderbilt ends Hek Wakefield or Bomar would tackle him. In a diagram of the game's plays, Vanderbilt's only completed pass was from Kuhn to Bomar. Bomar excelled against Tulane, blocking a number of punts in a 17–0 victory. Times-Picayune sportswriter Ed Hebert wrote, "Take Bomar out of the Vandy lineup and Tulane would have won the game by three touchdowns." A postseason charity game was played against former and contemporary Princeton Tigers all-stars. The game was a 7–7 tie, with Vanderbilt's touchdown scored on an 18-yard pass from Kuhn to Bomar.

Vanderbilt and Washington and Lee finished the season as Southern Conference co-champions. A sportswriters' poll chose the Commodores as best team in the South, awarding them the Pickens Trophy (awarded from 1923 to 1926). Bomar was a consensus All-American, receiving first-team honors from Collier's Weekly (Walter Camp) and second-team honors from Athletic World magazine. He was one of the first players from the South to receive first-team honors from Camp, who described the player:

Bomar of Vanderbilt is an experienced end of 200 pounds in weight, with speed, initiative, and an uncanny perception in diagnosing plays. Bomar can back up a line when needed, can not be swept out by swinging interference and is powerful enough to hold his own even when big guards and tackles come at him. As a receiver of a forward pass, he has, besides the skill, the excellent quality of being very hard to knock off his feet, and when he and the defense both try for the pass at the same time, Bomar is far more likely to get the ball because he outweighs the majority of defensive players. He has been used in all sorts of positions this year, both in attack and defense and this had broadened his scope and increased his value.

==== 1924 ====
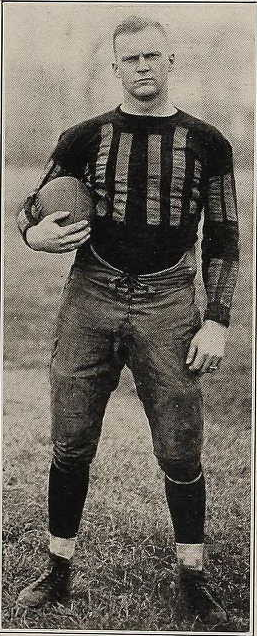
Bomar in uniform

During Bomar's senior season (when he moved to halfback), the Commodores tied the Quantico Marines 13–13. Bomar, picking up a fumble, ran 84 yards for a touchdown. According to a newspaper account, "It was Lynn Bomar's gigantic figure that broke up what looked like a Marine cakewalk. After receiving the kickoff, the Marines drove steadily to Vanderbilt's 10-yard line as Goettge repeatedly completed short passes. At the 10, Groves dropped back. The pass from center was low. He missed it. He reached for the ball. It trickled off his fingers. The Commodores were boring in. Wakefield was in there. Then Bomar came charging through. He picked up the ball and with a twist was out of Groves' grasp. He came out of the bunch with a long, charging run. Then he seemed a little undecided. One fleeting glance behind him and he struck out. Up came his free arm to brush off his headgear. His thin, yellow hair stood out. On he swept like a thundercloud of vengeance across the goal. Bedlam broke loose." Captain and guard Tuck Kelly was injured during the game, making Bomar the interim captain two weeks later against the Georgia Bulldogs.

In the Georgia game Bomar had a brain hemorrhage after he was kicked in the chin, and half his body was paralyzed for two days. It was thought that he would never play football again: "Not a player on the team could talk of Bomar's injury without tears coming to his eyes", and Bomar sat on the bench for the rest of the season's games. Known as a devastating blocker and "lightning fast," he was the first Commodore football player elected to the College Football Hall of Fame in 1956. At his induction Bomar said, "I just wish all the men who played with me at Vanderbilt between 1921 and 1924 could also receive this coveted award. They deserve it more than I do. After all, they made it possible for me to be chosen."

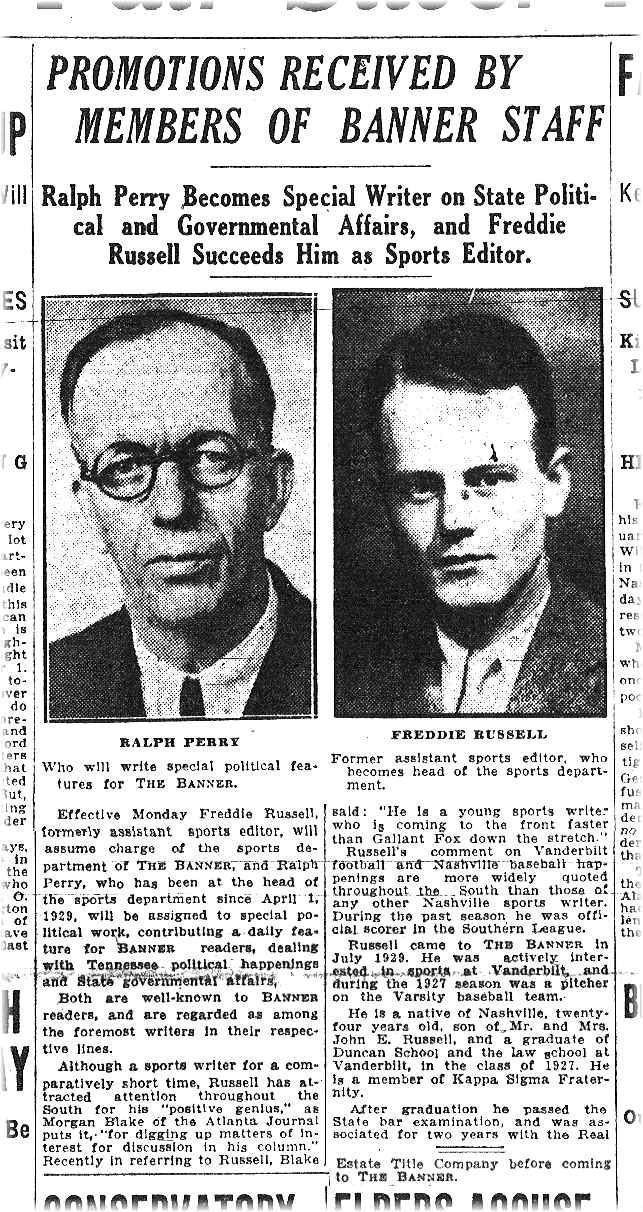
Fred Russell (right), around 1930

He was a member of Kappa Sigma fraternity. Nashville sportswriter Fred Russell, who entered Vanderbilt in 1924, told a story about Bomar in his autobiography Bury Me In An Old Press Box: "As a freshman I had pledged Kappa Sigma fraternity, which at that time had many varsity athletes. Among them was Lynn Bomar, selected All-American end in 1923 ... I also had the responsibility, as a freshman, of awakening Bomar in time for him to get to classes, and at the end of the school year I did this one morning by rolling the biggest lighted firecracker I ever saw under his bed. When it exploded I feared the whole corner of the fraternity house had been blown off, and I was so scared that even Bomar in his BVD's chasing me across the street and deep into the campus couldn't catch me."

Bomar in a three point stance

According to Vanderbilt's All-Southern halfback and 1924 captain-elect Gil Reese, "He would never let them jump on me. Whenever anyone would threaten me, Bomar was always right there to say 'Keep your hands off that boy'. They always did, too. Bomar always looked after me, and he always called back to me when we started on end runs. No one could run interference like Bomar." Bomar and Reese were on an all-time Vanderbilt team in the school's 1934 yearbook, and Bomar was chosen for an Associated Press Southeast Area all-time football team for the era from 1920 to 1969.

=== Basketball ===
Bomar also played baseball and basketball at Vanderbilt, and was a forward on the basketball team. He attracted large crowds at basketball games because of his football prowess.

==== 1922–23 ====
The 1922–23 team had a 16–8 record, beating the LSU Tigers but losing to the Virginia Tech Hokies in the Southern Intercollegiate Athletic Association tournament. An account of the LSU game read, "Either Vanderbilt was in rare form or L.S.U. has a good fighting team with no shooting ability. Fans were treated to the most one-sided contest of opening day when these two clubs met, the Commodores scoring 13 points before the Louisianans had counted once, winning 36 to 10." Bomar scored two points in the game.

==== 1923–24 ====
The team, coached by Josh Cody, had a 7–15 record. In the SoCon tournament, Vanderbilt defeated Clemson 42–13 and Bomar scored seven points. According to one account, "Reese and Bomar used to be famous for their forward pass work. They are still using it in basketball. Most of Bomar's passes to Reese are caught over the right shoulder with the recipient facing away from the passer." Along with Reese, All-Southern forward Alvin Bell was also a teammate. Vanderbilt lost the next game to the eventual tournament champions, Jack Cobb and Cartwright Carmichael-led North Carolina, 37–20. When Bomar was sidelined by a football injury in 1924, Gil Reese became the basketball team captain.

=== Baseball ===
He was a catcher on the baseball team. Cliff Wheatley spoke of the many good catchers from which to choose for his 1922 All-Southern baseball team, "And up at Vanderbilt, Lynn Bomar made a splendid record."

== New York Giants ==
=== 1925 ===
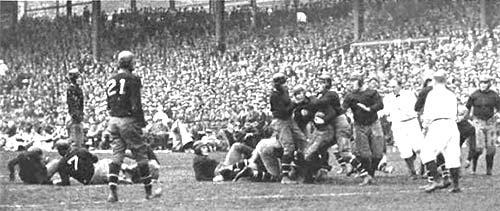
Frankford Yellow Jackets at New York Giants, 1925

Bomar fully recovered from his injury and played professional football as an end for the inaugural 1925 New York Giants of the National Football League (NFL) with Jim Thorpe, Century Milstead, and Owen Reynolds. He was signed to the Giants by Harry March.

The first noteworthy game for Bomar was a 14–0 loss to the Frankford Yellow Jackets. After the Giants' poor first half, the Yellow Jackets led by 14 points. During the second half the Giants recovered somewhat, with good passes from Jack McBride to Bomar but no chance of a comeback. In a 13–0 victory over the Rochester Jeffersons, McBride threw a 27-yard touchdown pass to Bomar. A 13–12 win over the Providence Steam Roller had a 24-yard touchdown pass from McBride to Bomar and an interesting ending. The Giants were backed up near their end zone, faced with a fourth down and leading 13–10. Providence was set for a blitz on the punter, but when he caught the ball he knelt in the end zone for a safety (not enough for Providence to win). Against the Kansas City Cowboys, several passes from McBride to Bomar netted 24 yards in a 67-yard touchdown drive for a 9–3 victory. Bomar had possibly his best day in a 23–0 victory over the Dayton Triangles before a crowd of 18,000. Six of McBride's completed passes that day were to Bomar, including a 45-yarder for the Giants' first touchdown. Bomar was selected to NFL president Joseph Carr's all-star team.

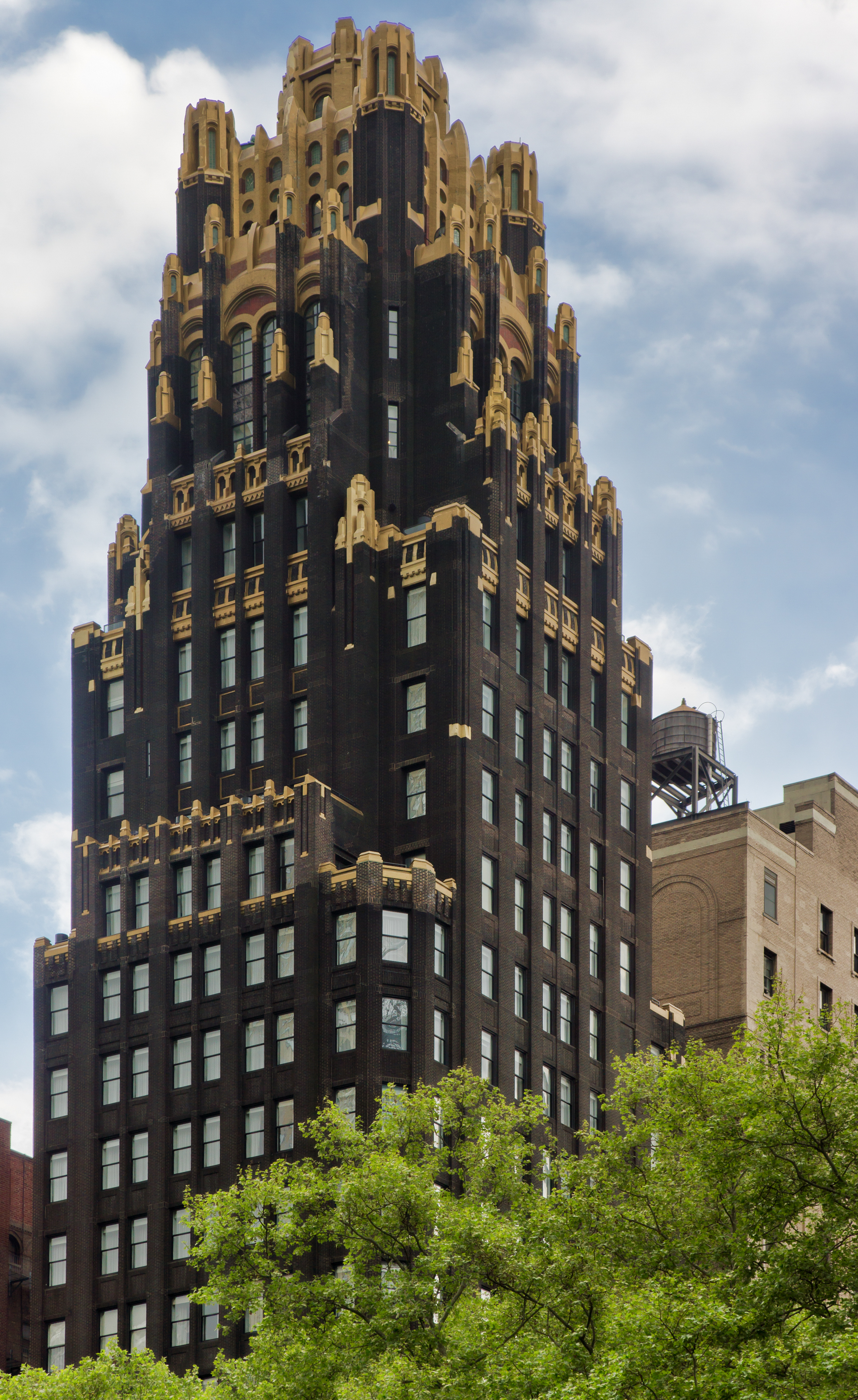
Bomar completed a pass to Hinkey Haines from the top of the American Radiator Building.

Although the Giants played well, the team experienced financial hardship during its first year. Player salaries were so low that most had to take additional jobs to support themselves. The team's brief practices, held at 4:30 p. m. each day to accommodate outside-work schedules, enabled little in-season improvement. Overshadowed by baseball, boxing and college football, professional football was not a popular sport in 1925 and owner Tim Mara spent $25,000 of his own money during the season to keep the team going. The financial struggle continued until the 11th game of the season, when the visiting Red Grange and the Chicago Bears drew more than 73,000 fans (a pro-football record) and an additional 20,000 were turned away. This gave the Giants much-needed revenue, possibly altering the team's history. In the 19–7 Bears victory, Grange intercepted a pass intended for Bomar and returned it for a touchdown.

=== 1926 ===
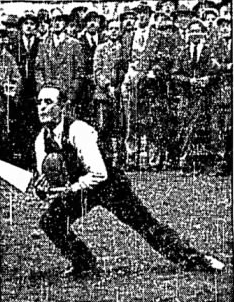
Haines making the catch

In the season's second week Bomar scored against Providence on a 15-yard pass from McBride, and he scored on a 37-yard touchdown pass from Walt Koppisch against Kansas City. However, his football career ended abruptly when he dislocated his knee in a game against the Brooklyn Lions.

==== Longest pass ====
From the top of the American Radiator Building to the ground in Bryant Park, a drop of 324 feet (98.75 m), Bomar completed a pass to Hinkey Haines for a record on November 12. Haines caught the ball on the fifth attempt. On Bomar's first attempt, the New York Times reported that the ball "hit the sidewalk and burst" and the third pass knocked Haines over. The stunt took place two days before a game with the Los Angeles Buccaneers. "It was as much as anything a playful jab at Brick Muller" (the Buccaneers' end), who caught a pass thrown from atop the Telephone Building—a drop of 320 feet (97.5 m)—in San Francisco the year before to advertise the first East-West Shrine Game.

== Personal life ==
Bomar married Veturia Edna Hicks on November 20, 1927, in Williamson County, Tennessee. Their only son, Robert, was a resident surgeon at Vanderbilt Hospital. Bomar was a Baptist.

== Law-enforcement career ==
After football and marriage, Bomar was assistant manager of the Colonial Hotel in Springfield, Tennessee for seven years. He sold life insurance, but found it dull. Bomar then began a long career in law enforcement, beginning in the United States Marshals Service office from 1934 to 1939. In 1939 he became a division chief with the Knoxville Highway Patrol and a year later became director of public safety, overseeing the city's police and fire departments. For a few months the public-safety position was eliminated, and Bomar was again the Highway Patrol division chief. Governor Prentice Cooper promoted him to chief on a trial basis in 1942, when the incumbent went on active duty in World War II.

=== Commissioner of Public Safety ===
In 1945, Bomar was appointed as both state commissioner of public safety and patrol chief. In this capacity he worked for the Tennessee Motor Transportation Association, Universal Tire and Appliance Company and the Tennessee Superintendent of Public Works.

==== Columbia Race Riots ====
In 1946, Bomar supervised the ransacking of African-American households in the Columbia Race Riot. A February 25 fight between James Stephenson, an African-American Navy veteran, and a white shopkeeper reportedly ignited the unrest. Later that day there was gunfire, fighting and rioting between whites and African Americans in Mink Slide, Columbia's African-American business district. When black citizens shot out the street lights, three officers and a chief responded to the gunfire; all four were shot. Bomar, described by one writer as commanding "the firing line of the State Highway Police," led the team sent in after the shootings with permission from the state attorney general to search homes and businesses for weapons. None of the accused were granted bail or allowed legal counsel, and 12 were charged with attempted murder.

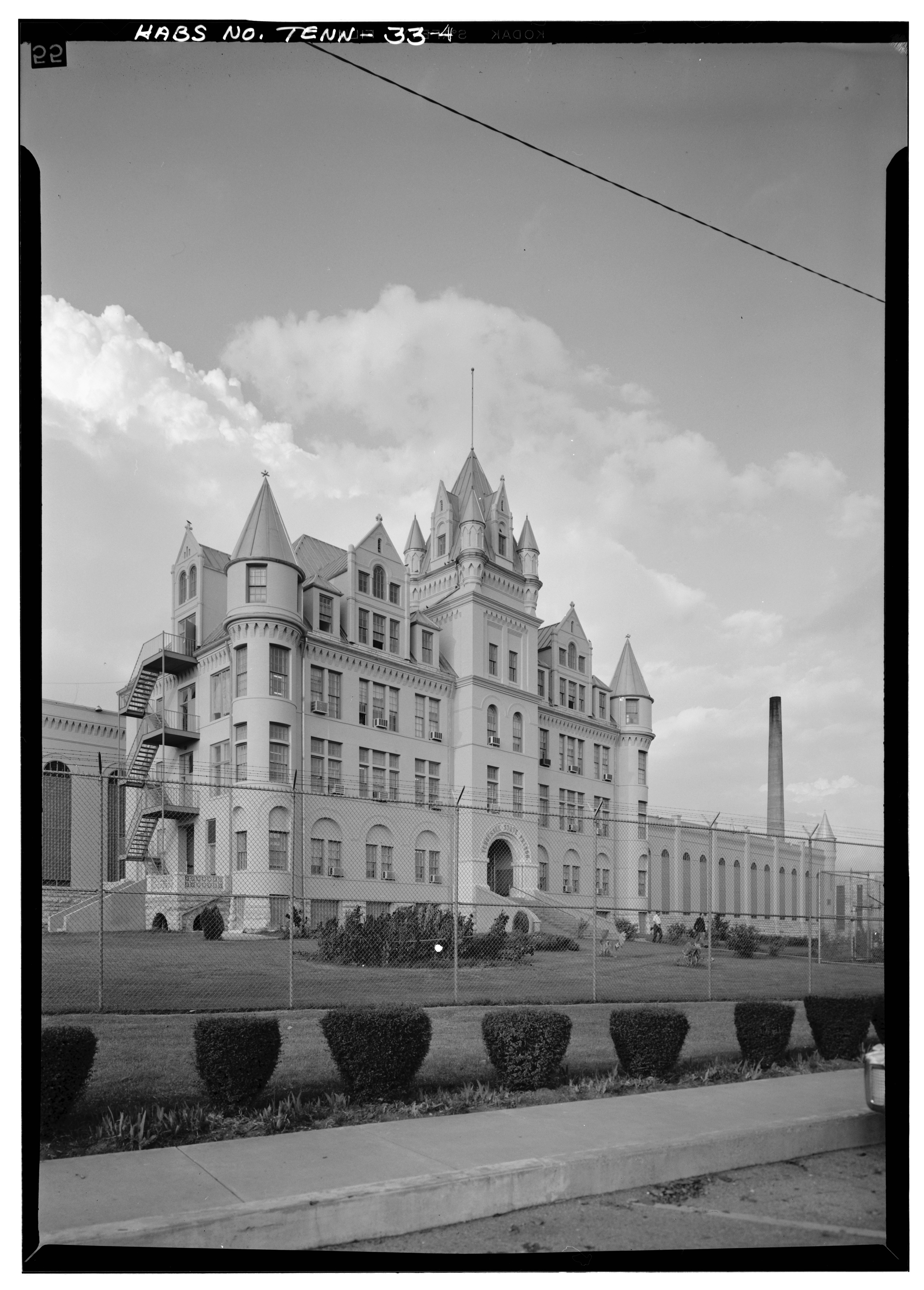
Tennessee State Prison.

Under oath in court, Bomar said that he had no search warrant and anticipated that he would not have a warrant the next time he searched similar properties. He called journalist Vincent Sheean a "lying Communistic yellow ——." According to a contemporary account, "In this situation, even though it's fair to say [Bomar] was just doing his job, it's equally clear that he was a loose cannon. His personality dominated the scene, and it was the personality of a bully."

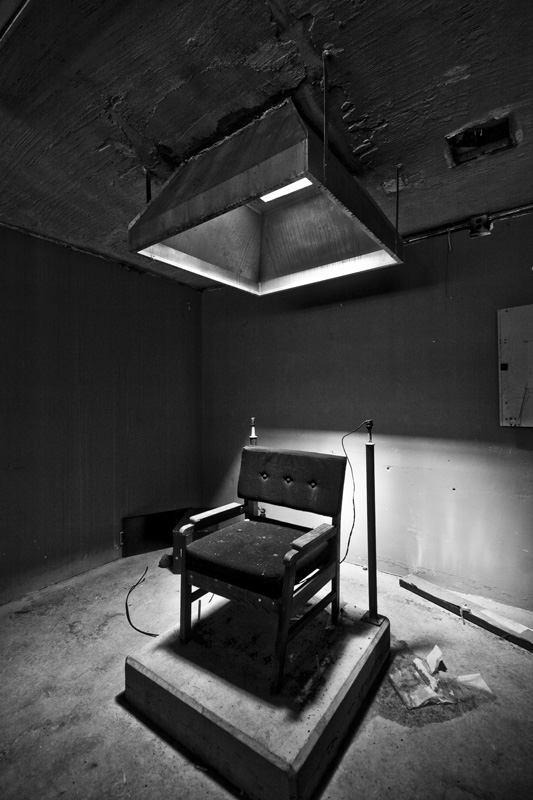
The remains of Tennessee State Prison's electric-chair chamber on death row

=== Warden ===
Bomar was warden of Tennessee State Prison from 1955 until his death. He oversaw the execution of several men including William Tines, an African American convicted of raping a 45-year-old white woman, who was executed in the electric chair. Tines was the last man executed by electrocution in Tennessee, and the last person executed until Robert Glen Coe in 2000.

==== The Prisonaires ====
Bomar supported the Prisonaires, a doo-wop quintet of inmates who received a BMI award for their hit "Just Walkin' in the Rain" in his office. A spoken-word track on their album, Only Believe ... , was "Message from Prison Warden Lynn Bomar".

== Death ==
On June 11, 1964, Bomar died a few hours after a heart attack. In 1966, he was posthumously inducted into the Tennessee Sports Hall of Fame.
