= Gil Reese =

American athlete (1901–1993)

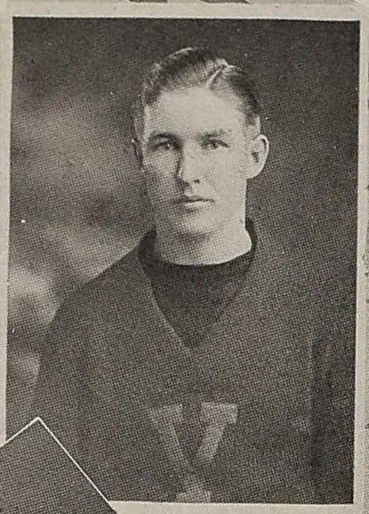
- Reese in 1922 "The Tupelo Flash"

Biographical details
- Born: January 14, 1901; Tupelo, Mississippi, U.S.
- Died: May 30, 1993 (aged 92); Obion, Tennessee, U.S.

Playing career

Football:
- 1922–1925: Vanderbilt

Baseball:
- 1922–1925: Vanderbilt

Basketball:
- 1922–1925: Vanderbilt
- Positions: Halfback, forward, Outfielder

Coaching career (HC unless noted)
- 1926: UT Doctors
- 1927: New Bry's Hurricanes (AFL)
- 1933: Southern Rails baseball
- 1936–?: Sacred Heart High School (Memphis, Tennessee)

Accomplishments and honors

Championships
- Football: 2 SoCon (1922, 1923)

Awards
- Three-sport captain (1925); Porter Cup (1924); Football: 2× All-Southern (1923, 1924) third-team All-American (1923, 1924); 1934 All-time Vandy team

David Argillus "Gil" Reese (January 14, 1901 – May 30, 1993) nicknamed "the Tupelo Flash" (Note: As well as "the son of Mercury" and the "Mississippi Meteor".) was an American football, basketball, and baseball player for the Vanderbilt Commodores of Vanderbilt University. He was captain of all three his senior year, the first to do so at Vanderbilt. Gil was the brother of baseball player Andy Reese, playing with him on the Florence Independents in Alabama.

== Early years ==
Gil was born on January 14, 1901 in Tupelo, Mississippi, attended and played sports at Tupelo High School with his brother Andy.

== Vanderbilt University ==
Reese attended Vanderbilt University in Nashville. He was a member of the Phi Kappa Psi fraternity. Reese received the Bachelor of Ugliness his senior year.

=== Football ===
Reese played for coach Dan McGugin's Vanderbilt Commodores football teams from 1922 to 1925. Gil was a prominent member of Commodores teams that compiled a win–loss–tie record of 26–5–3 (.797) over his four seasons, including two Southern Conference titles. Gil weighed 155 pounds and wore number 11. He was a main focus of backfield coach and former Vanderbilt great Lewie Hardage ever since his first year. "I played against Reese three years" said Billy Harkness, former Tennessee Volunteers quarterback and captain of its 1926 team, "and touched his heel once." It was said Reese could run 100 yards in 10.1 seconds. In 1934, Reese was selected for Vanderbilt's all-time football team.

==== 1922 ====
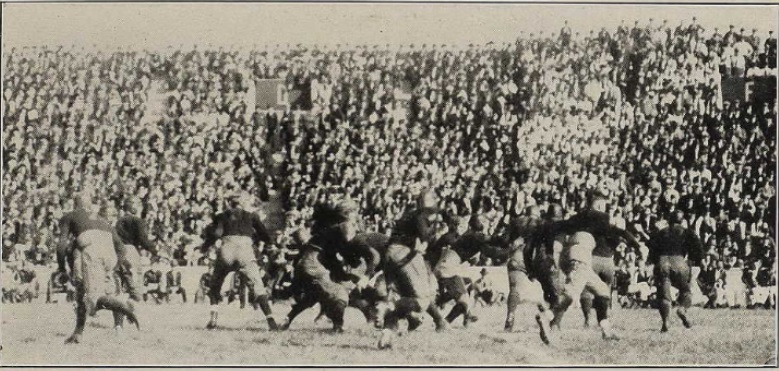
The Wolverines chasing after Reese in 1922

His freshman season opened with a 38 to 0 triumph over Middle Tennessee State, "The game being featured by the brilliant running of Gil Reese." In his second game, against Henderson-Brown, Reese gave an otherwise lethargic first half from the Commodores its lone spark. Their only points of the half came on a 70-yard touchdown run in the first quarter, in which Reese darted through the entire Henderson-Brown defense. Vanderbilt found its stride in the second half, scoring 26 points, and winning 33 to 0. His third week was the big one, as a starter in the scoreless tie with the Michigan Wolverines at the dedication of Dudley Field, Reese made 105 yards on punt returns, including one return of 24 yards. Though displaying skill, he was contained by the Wolverines, forcing his movement sideways. Reese once "side stepped his way through half the Michigan team for eight yards." Walter Camp was impressed by Reese's punt returns that day.

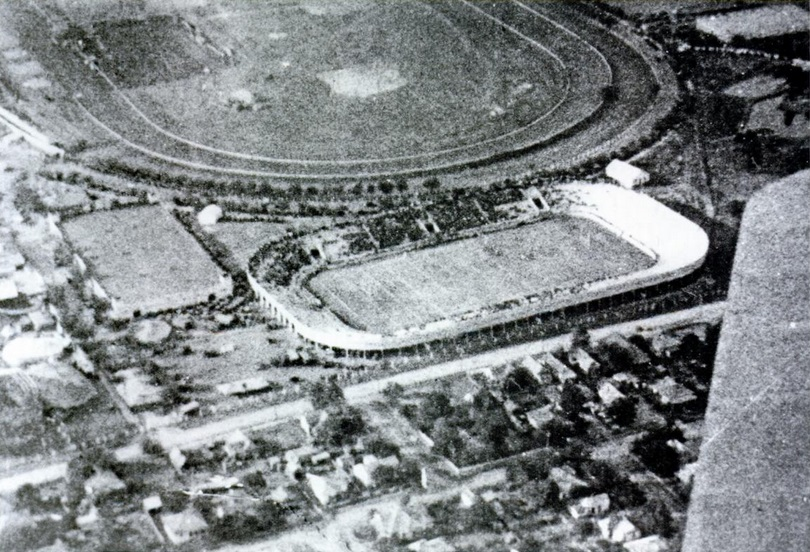
Fair Park Stadium, place of the Texas game, circa 1922

The following game against Texas at the Texas State Fair saw the Commodores win 20 to 10. Reese was the widely accepted player of the game, scoring all three of Vanderbilt's touchdowns, breaking tackles and sprinting past the Texas defense. After a fumble recovery by Hek Wakefield at the 25-yard line, Reese eventually punched it in off-tackle for the game's first touchdown as Vanderbilt led 7 to 3. The second score came later after captain Jess Neely broke a streak of lethargic offense, running back a 30-yard punt return. Starting from the 40-yard line, this drive was credited to Reese. After two Vanderbilt runs, one of about ten yards around end from Scotty Neill and another of about four yards through the middle from Doc Kuhn, Reese jetted around the end, "slipping here, twirling there," for a 46-yard touchdown. In the second half, Neely hit Lynn Bomar on a long pass that went twenty-three yards in the air, with Bomar running for some twenty more and down close to the goal. Reese ran it in on the next play, and the try was good. Vanderbilt 20, Texas 10. Reese also got an interception against Texas.

In the Kentucky game, Reese was sent in for Freddie Meiers to close out the game. He had one run of 35 yards, failing to score because of Kentucky's Brewer just getting his feet from behind. The final week against Sewanee saw Vanderbilt win 26 to 0. The first scoring drive was marked by dashes around end from Reese and powerful runs off tackle by Freddie Meiers. Reese went around the right end for 13 yards. Meiers then ran all the way down to Sewanee's 14-yard line, and Reese skirted around left end for ten more. After Meiers failed to gain on the next play, Reese carried the ball for a score on a flank attack. Towards the end of the game, Reese took two runs which together accounted for 19 yards. He then ran up behind center to power his way into the end zone. (Note: The umpire got knocked down on this play, and suffered a sprained ankle.) At year's end, Reese appeared on Billy Evans's Southern Honor Roll and the second team of All-Southerns chosen by Homer George, sports editor for The Atlanta Constitution.

==== 1923 ====
The 1923 rematch against Michigan saw Vanderbilt lose a bitterly fought game 3 to 0. Both Reese and Wolverine halfback Harry Kipke were "marked men"; and Vanderbilt's offense never crossed the 35-yard line. Reese and Doc Kuhn were said to raise fans to their feet with the showcase of speed, but the Wolverines kept it confined to sideways runs of little gain. The game versus the Tennessee Volunteers saw Vanderbilt gain 455 yards of total offense, winning 51 to 7. Reese rushed for 214 yards, as well as 95 yards on punt returns. He scored five times, with touchdown runs of 70 yards, 45 yards, and 29 yards respectively. With the win Vanderbilt was still a contender for the Southern title.

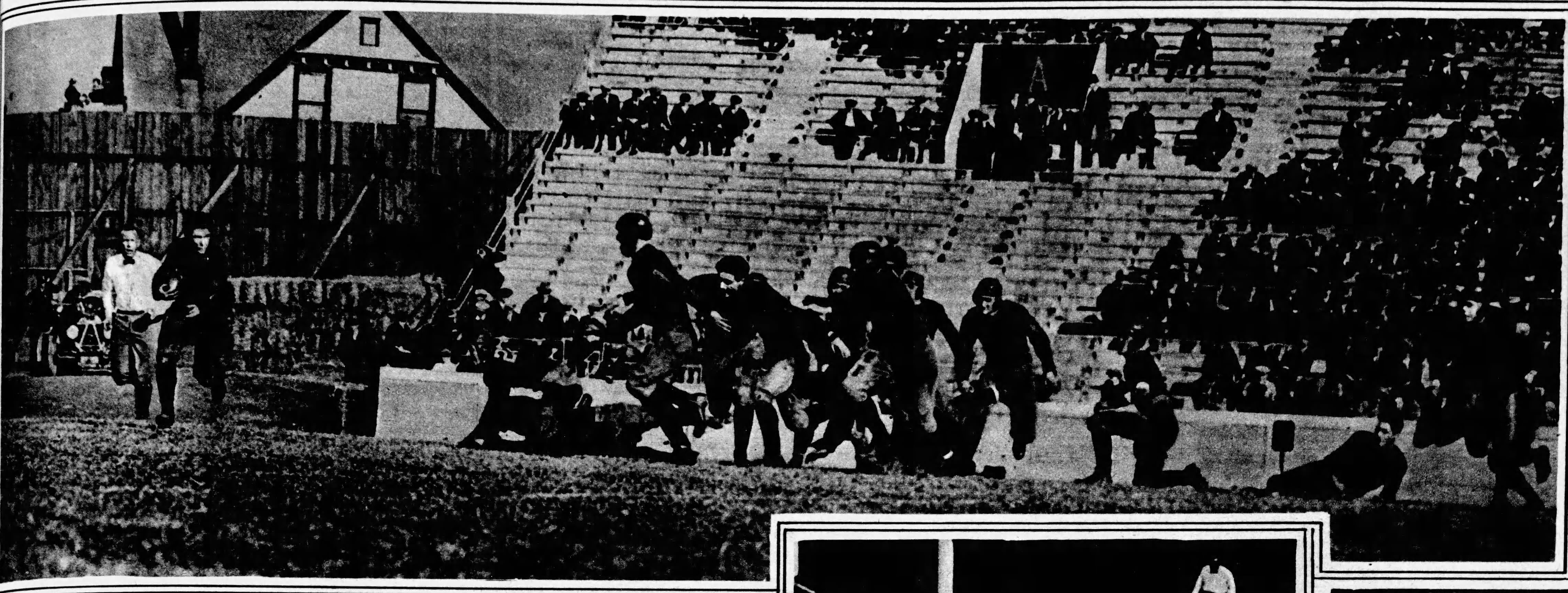
Reese's 81-yard touchdown against Georgia

Reese again stuffed the stat sheet against the Georgia Bulldogs the next week, scoring four touchdowns. Two came on punt returns, and another two on the ground. Fred Russell would say this was when "the Gold and Black hit the season's peak." Morgan Blake, sportswriter in the Atlanta Journal, wrote "No southern team has given the Georgia Bulldogs such a licking in a decade." (Note: Georgia was labeled "Dixie's top team;" its only loss coming against traditional powerhouse Yale. Georgia's defense had previously shut out all its Southern Conference opponents, with no southern team crossing the Bulldogs' 20 or 25 yard line.) Reese foreshadowed what was to come with a 23-yard run. The first touchdown came on a 5-yard run from Reese behind guard Tuck Kelly. Just a bit later, Reese returned a punt for 63 yards and the touchdown. Reese started the return by running wide to the right; seven Georgia players were in hot pursuit. Reese stopped in his tracks, causing two Georgia defenders to go past him. Running down the sideline and weaving through the rest of the defenders' missed tackles, eventually Reese was beyond them all and ran in for the score.

When you say that Mr. Reese is a combination of a greyhound, rabbit, antelope, and greased pig you only mildly do this young gentleman justice.

— Morgan Blake

Morgan Blake says this score was what broke the Bulldogs' will. He further lamented,"when you say that Mr. Reese is a combination of a greyhound, rabbit, antelope, and greased pig you only mildly do this young gentleman justice." The first half ended with Vanderbilt up 14 to 0. The Bulldogs had not yet managed a single first down. Later in the third quarter, Reese ran for 30 yards on a sneak play. It "not only fooled the Bulldogs but everyone in the stands." It seemed there was a moment of not knowing where the ball was, until Reese shot out the other side of the line. Punishing runs off tackle then led the Commodores to another touchdown. In the fourth quarter, Reese ran for an 81-yard touchdown. He did it running up the middle of the field, and "behind great interference furnished by the entire Vanderbilt team, and especially Bomar and Kuhn." Former Vanderbilt coach Wallace Wade, who was at the game scouting Georgia, said the Commodores that day were "the smartest I ever saw." Reese ran for over 200 yards for the second week in a row, with 232 yards on his five largest plays and over 300 total yards. The final game of the year versus Sewanee was marred by the rain. On a fourth down Doc Kuhn hit Reese on a pass, and Reese scampered across the goal line. Vanderbilt won 7 to 0.

Reese in uniform on the sidelines

Reese was selected to be All-Southern. In the polling done by the Atlanta Journal, Reese received the second most votes of any All-Southern player with 25. (Note: The most went to Douglas Wycoff, fullback at Georgia Tech, who faced little competition.) Reese was the leading scorer on the Vanderbilt offense of 1923, responsible for at least 60 of the team's 137 points, on ten touchdowns. He was selected as a Third Team All-American by David J. Walsh of the International News Service.

==== 1924 ====
In the second week of play in 1924, Reese scored four touchdowns as Vanderbilt smothered the Birmingham–Southern Panthers 61-0. The score was not so expected, for the Panthers had held Auburn to merely a 7-0 victory the week before. Ralph McGill described Reese's day: "He stars. A man dashes at him and goes sprawling on the ground. There is another. A twist of the body and a step to the side and he is gone, left to lie on the sod and meditate on the fate that is his. Three or four men rush at him. There is a swirl of action, flying feet and diving bodies, and out of it—Reese running with the grace of a deer. Reese's action is never desperate. He never seems harassed or hurried. His spectacular runs are things of athletic beauty, There is no lost motion. It is perfect." The next week the Commodores tied the Quantico Marines 13 to 13. The Commodores' second touchdown came on a 59-yard drive with a flurry of forward passes; as well as runs from Tom Ryan through the line and Gil Reese around it. Reese eventually ran into the end zone.

Two weeks later against Georgia, 1923 consensus All-American Lynn Bomar suffered an injury which would tragically end his career with Vanderbilt football. A kick to the chin from a cleat gave him a severe brain hemorrhage, leaving him with half of his body paralyzed for two days. It was figured he would never play football again. "Not a player on the team could talk of Bomar's injury without tears coming to his eyes." Gil Reese once recollected: "He would never let them jump on me. Whenever anyone would threaten me, Bomar was always right there to say; "Keep your hands off that boy." They always did, too. Bomar always looked after me, and he always called back to me when we started on end runs. No one could run interference like Bomar." Bomar would defy the odds and return to play football the very next year with the New York Giants in their inaugural season, leaving after 1926 from a different injury.

During the first quarter of the game against the Mississippi A & M Aggies, Reese caught a punt from the Aggies' halfback Patty and ran 54 yards for a touchdown behind excellent blocking. The next game saw the Commodores avenge the 44 to 0 drubbing of 1920 with a 3 to 0 victory in 1924. The Commodores were followed by the largest crowd ever to accompany Vanderbilt on a trip, with five special sections. The lone score of the game could largely be credited to Reese. Vanderbilt elected to start the game with the wind at its back, hoping for an edge in punts which would lead to good field position early. Reese caught one of these punts in these exchanges on the fly and, noticing both of Tech's ends blocked to the ground, raced to within striking distance of the end zone. From here, Hek Wakefield made a drop kick. Reese's day on the ground was not so spectacular, having a total of – 15 yards rushing.

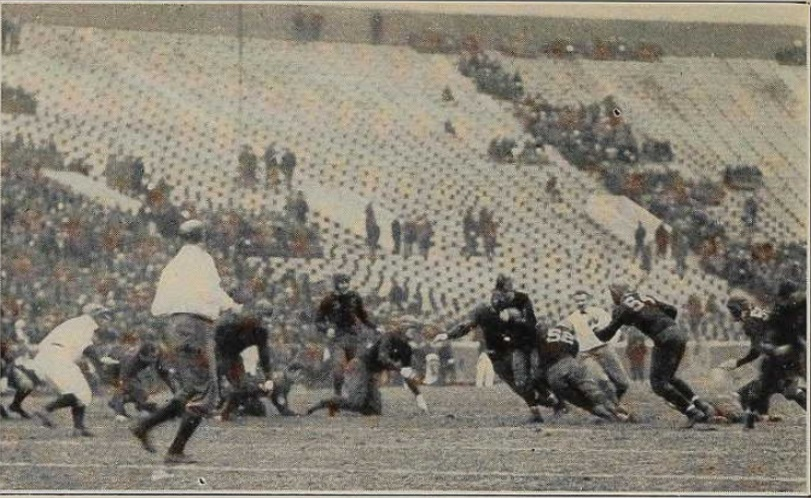
Reese being tackled during the Minnesota game

The next week against the Minnesota Golden Gophers at Memorial Stadium saw the first victory for Vanderbilt over a Northern school. The Commodores made not one substitution. "It was the most glorious victory in the annals of Vanderbilt and Southern football" said the Vanderbilt yearbook. The first touchdown drive ended when Tom Ryan broke through a hole created by Bob Rives, finishing a 63-yard drive. A pass from Ox McKibbon to Reese, and off tackle runs by Ryan, Reese, and Neil Cargile put the Commodores in the position to score. Vanderbilt did not get a single first down in the second quarter. Later, in the third quarter, McKibbon threw a pass which gained 18 yards, and then threw another one of 10 yards, to Reese, who ran in the score. Reese made the All-Southern squad at year's end. He was also selected as a Third-Team All-American by Norman E. Brown. Gil was elected to captain the team the next year.

==== 1925 ====
In the 1925 game against the Tennessee Volunteers, Reese had the longest run of the college football season up to that point, of 95 yards. Describing the most spectacular play he ever saw, Georgia Tech coach William Alexander cites one from the 1925 game against Vanderbilt. Star back Doug Wycoff was hurt, such that he had to use his substitute Dick Wright. On a muddy field, Wright ran off tackle and dodged Vanderbilt's safety Gil Reese, "usually a sure tackler", to get the touchdown to give Tech a 7 to 0 victory. His final game was a 19–7 win over Sewanee. Fred Russell's Fifty Years of Vanderbilt Football stated, "Gil Reese played one of his greatest games but sobbed as he pulled off his No. 11 jersey in the locker room. He was through." Reese then played in the first East–West Shrine Game in San Francisco.

=== Basketball ===
==== 1923–24 ====
The 1923–24 team coached by Josh Cody went 7–15. In the SoCon tournament Vanderbilt defeated Clemson 42–13. Reese scored 18. One account reads "Reese and Bomar used to be famous for their forward pass work. They are still using it in basketball. Most of Bomar's passes to Reese are caught over the right shoulder with the recipient facing away from the passer." Along with Bomar, All-Southern forward Alvin Bell was also a teammate. The team lost the next game to the eventual tournament champion, Jack Cobb and Cartwright Carmichael led North Carolina, 37–20.

When Bomar was injured in 1924 and could no longer play basketball, Reese was made the team's captain.

=== Baseball ===
Reese also played baseball at Vanderbilt, at a different position each year. He once beat Vanderbilt's track team in a race whilst wearing his baseball uniform. He also was captain of the baseball team, making him captain of the football, basketball, and baseball teams; the first to do so at Vanderbilt.

== Pro baseball ==
Gil was the brother of baseball player Andy Reese, playing with him on the Florence Independents in Alabama. On November 29, 1926, Gil Reese signed a contract to play with the Nashville Vols. Next year the 1927 Jackson Senators of the Cotton States League attempted to sign Reese.

== Coaching career ==
Reese coached the University of Tennessee Doctors in Memphis in 1926. He coached the New Brys Hurricanes of the American Football League in 1927, posting a 3–0–1 record. Reese was named athletic coach at Sacred Heart High School in Memphis, Tennessee, in 1936.

== Head coaching record ==
=== College ===
Year	Team	Overall	Conference	Standing	Bowl/playoffs
Tennessee Docs (Independent) (1926)
1926	Tennessee Docs	3–5			
Tennessee Docs:		3–5			
Total:		3–5			

=== Professional ===
Year	Team	Overall	Conference	Standing	Bowl/playoffs
New Bry's Hurricanes (American Football League) (1927)
1927	New Bry's Hurricanes	3–0–1			
New Bry's Hurricanes:		3–0–1			
Total:		3–0–1			

== See also ==
- 1924 College Football All-America Team
- 1925 College Football All-America Team
- List of Vanderbilt University athletes
