= John P. Gorman =

American football player and coach (1897–1983)

Biographical details
- Born: March 10, 1897; Pompey, New York, U.S.
- Died: October 30, 1983 (aged 86); Neshanic, New Jersey, U.S.
- Education: Princeton University

Playing career
- 1922: Princeton
- Position: Quarterback

Coaching career (HC unless noted)
- 1930–1942: Princeton (freshman)

Accomplishments and honors

Championships
- National (1922)

John Paul Gorman (March 10, 1897 – October 30, 1983) was a college football player and coach at Princeton University.

== Playing career ==
Gorman running against Yale.

He was a prominent quarterback for the Princeton Tigers football team. He stood 5 feet 7 inches and weighed 154 pounds.

=== 1922 ===
Gorman led the "Team of Destiny" which won a national title.

=== 1923 ===
In a postseason contest of Princeton all-stars against southern champion Vanderbilt, Gorman scored his team's points in a 7 to 7 tie. Lynn Bomar got Vandy's touchdown.

== Coaching career ==
He coached the freshman team of his alma mater from 1930 to 1942.
