= E. M. Waller =

American football player and coach (1904–1988)

Biographical details
- Born: October 18, 1904; Bessemer, Alabama, U.S.
- Died: June 4, 1988 (aged 83); Falls Church, Virginia, U.S.

Playing career

Football
- 1924–1926: Vanderbilt
- Position: Quarterback

Coaching career (HC unless noted)

Football
- 1927–1932: Bessemer City HS (AL)
- 1933–1934: Middle Tennessee State Teachers

Basketball
- 1933–1935: Middle Tennessee State Teachers

Baseball
- 1933–1935: Middle Tennessee State Teachers

Head coaching record
- Overall: 3–14–1 (college football); 9–12 (college basketball); 49–11–4 (high school football)

Edmund Meredith "Nig" Waller (October 18, 1904 – June 4, 1988) was an American football player and coach. He served as the head football coach at Middle Tennessee State University from 1934 to 1935. He also coached basketball and baseball there from 1933 to 1935. During his two-season tenure as basketball coach at Middle Tennessee State, Waller compiled an overall record of 9–2. His football record was an overall 3–14–1. Waller played quarterback under Dan McGugin at Vanderbilt University from 1924 to 1926. He was called "Nig" due to his dark complexion. He was coach when Middle Tennessee was first dubbed the "Blue Raiders."

Prior to coaching at Middle Tennessee State University, Waller coached at Bessemer City High School in Bessemer, Alabama. In seven seasons at Bessemer, Waller went 49–11–4 (.797).

== Head coaching record ==
=== College football ===
Year	Team	Overall	Conference	Standing	Bowl/playoffs
Middle Tennessee State Teachers Blue Raiders (Southern Intercollegiate Athletic Association) (1933–1934)
1933	Middle Tennessee State Teachers	1–7–1	0–4	32nd	
1934	Middle Tennessee State Teachers	2–7	1–3	24th	
Middle Tennessee State Teachers:		3–14–1	1–7		
Total:		3–14–1			

=== College basketball ===
Record table
Season	Team	Overall	Conference	Standing	Postseason
Middle Tennessee State Teachers Blue Raiders (Independent) (1933–1935)
1933–34	Middle Tennessee State Teachers	6–5			
1934–35	Middle Tennessee State Teachers	3–7			
Middle Tennessee State Teachers:		9–12			
Total:		9–12			
