= Fred Russell =

American sportswriter (1906–2003)

- Russell, c. 1975
- Born: Frederick McFerrin Russell; August 27, 1906; Wartrace, Tennessee, U.S.
- Died: January 26, 2003 (aged 96); Nashville, Tennessee, U.S.
- Education: Vanderbilt University
- Occupation: Sportswriter
- Spouse: Katherine Wyche Early (Kay)
- Children: four girls

Fred Russell (August 27, 1906 – January 26, 2003) was an American sportswriter from Tennessee who served as sports editor for the Nashville Banner newspaper for 68 years (1930–1998). He was a member of the Heisman Trophy Committee, president of the Football Writers Association of America and a member of several sports-related Halls of Fame. He served for nearly 30 years as chairman of the College Football Hall of Fame Honors Court, a group responsible for selecting College Football Hall of Fame members. Known for his sense of humor and story-telling ability, Russell authored several books about sports and sports humor. Over his career he wrote over 12,000 sports columns under the title, "Sideline Sidelights".

Russell was a long-time friend and protégé of fellow sportswriter and Vanderbilt University alumnus Grantland Rice. Vanderbilt established the "Fred Russell–Grantland Rice Sportswriting Scholarship" in their honor. For over fifty years, the scholarship has attracted some of the nation's top journalistic talent.

As a young reporter, he interviewed Babe Ruth, Ty Cobb, and Lou Gehrig. Outliving most of his contemporaries, he counted as friends many sports greats of the twentieth century, including Jack Dempsey, Bobby Jones, Red Grange, Sparky Anderson, Bobby Knight, Bear Bryant, Archie Manning and George Steinbrenner. He died in 2003 at age 96.

== Early life ==
Born in 1906, Russell grew up in Wartrace, Tennessee, about 50 miles southeast of Nashville, on the main line of the railroad to Chattanooga. His parents were John E. Russell and Mable Lee McFerrin Russell, who in 1920 moved the family to Nashville. John E. Russell Jr. was his older brother, who died in 1961. Russell's father started a newspaper, the Wartrace Tribune, but it was short-lived; he became a salesman for a wholesale grocery company and traveled the middle Tennessee territory with a horse and buggy in his early career. Russell's mother was a music composer (Note: In the 1890s, she published "Violets So Blue", "I love You", and "The Vanderbilt University Waltz". The latter was featured on "Vanderbilt Day" in a ceremony at the Tennessee Centennial Exposition in 1897 when the statue of Commodore Cornelius Vanderbilt was presented to the university.) and author of the "Vanderbilt University Waltz". Russell attended Nashville's Duncan College Preparatory School for Boys, which was located at a site now occupied by Vanderbilt University's Memorial Gymnasium. Even from his youngest days, Russell had loved the sports pages. He wanted a job as a newspaper office boy, but it only paid three dollars per week and he could make much more by working at a soda fountain downtown at the United Cigar Store. One of his best friends around the cigar store was Phil Harris, whose father was a musician at the adjacent Knickerbocker Theater. Russell saved enough money over a year to enter Vanderbilt in the fall of 1923. He was a member of Kappa Sigma fraternity, and a varsity baseball player. He played second base and pitched. He attended Vanderbilt Law School, passed the state bar exam, and was listed in the class of 1929. He did legal work at a title company for 18 months and found out pretty quickly that "it was not the most exciting kind of work". He was offered a job at the Nashville Banner; first writing obituaries, then working the police beat, then covering Vanderbilt football. Regarding the football coverage Russell said, “I got the luckiest break in the world in June of '29. . . in weeks, I knew that I never wanted to do anything else." The following year, he became the sports editor of the Banner, replacing Ralph McGill who left to go to the Atlanta Constitution. Russell would be a member of the Banner staff until the paper closed in 1998. Over the next 68 years, Russell wrote over 12,000 columns, most of them in his weekly column "Sideline Sidelights " later shortened to simply "Sidelines".

== The Saturday Evening Post ==
Russell's career began in the so-called Golden Age of sports—a period beginning about the 1920s when newspapers and radio were a prominent form of media and news. The events Russell regularly covered were: college football; amateur and pro baseball; the Masters Golf Tournament; the Kentucky Derby; championship boxing; college football bowl games, including The Sugar Bowl and The Rose Bowl; and The Olympic Games (1960–1976). Russell gained national exposure in the mid-twentieth century for writing a widely-read annual college football article, the "Pigskin Preview", for The Saturday Evening Post. His relationship with the Post began when the magazine wanted to do a story on the University of Tennessee's new football coach, Bob Neyland, who had in 1939 created arguably one of the greatest football teams ever assembled: undefeated, untied, and un-scored-upon in the regular season. The magazine wanted a southern writer, and chose Russell. His article, "Touchdown Engineer" appeared in the issue leading up to the highly anticipated 1940 Rose Bowl (Tennessee vs. USC) and put Russell on the national scene in sportswriting. The article's popularity led the Post to hire him to write the Pigskin Preview series each year from 1949 to 1962.

== Sportswriting scholarship ==
Grantland Rice was an influential pioneer of the sportswriting world and he was Russell's boyhood idol. They first met in the 1930s and remained longtime friends even though Rice was 26 years older. They were both raised in Nashville and both graduates of Vanderbilt University. Rice worked for about three years at the Tennessean from 1907 to 1910.

In May 1954, when Rice was in declining health, Russell recalled a memorable lunch with him at Rice's regular corner table at Toots Shor's restaurant in New York. With sportswriter Bill Corum, they swapped stories extending all afternoon until five o'clock with Schor himself in on some of them. When Rice died two months later, Russell and Corum developed the idea of creating a Rice scholarship and, in 1956, the Grantland Rice Scholarship at Vanderbilt was begun. Endowed by the Thoroughbred Racing Association (TRA), (Note: TRA is the Thoroughbred Racing Association, an organization that funded the scholarship initially because of Grantland Rice's love of horse racing and his writing about the industry.) the scholarship is awarded annually to an incoming first-year student with an interest in sportswriting. The rules do not require recipients to be sportswriters; in addition, Vanderbilt did not have a school of journalism. From the beginning, Russell was involved in the administration and selection process of the scholarship. In 1986, after Russell had been closely managing the endeavor for 30 years, Charles J. Cella, a past president of the TRA, further endowed the scholarship with a $500,000 gift in honor of Russell, changing its name to the Fred Russell-Grantland Rice Sportswriting Scholarship. For over fifty years, the scholarship has attracted some of the nation's top journalistic talent coming out of high school. Some of the more well-known recipients have included Skip Bayless, Roy Blount, and Andrew Maraniss. The scholarship fell on hard times in the 1990s when the university reduced the award to $10,000 yearly to prolong the life of scholarship. With rising tuition costs, the later scholarship was roughly one quarter of the full package earlier recipients received.

== College Football Hall of Fame ==
For nearly three decades, Russell was the chairman of the National Football Foundation (NFF)'s "Honors Court" which oversees the College Football Hall of Fame. The organization was founded in 1947, and Russell became involved in it in the 1960s to become president in 1964. According to author Andrew Derr, the Honors Court is the most powerful group in college football. Russell served its chairman from 1964 to 1991, a role perfectly suited for him because he had, according to Derr, "an instinctive sense of fairness and prudence" along with significant experience in college football and relationships with the coaches and administrators. Derr said, "From Paul Bryant to Archie Manning, Frank Broyles to Lee Corso, Johnny Majors to Lou Holtz, Russell had relationships with all of them." A difficult decision came to Russell and the committee in 1959, when LSU's Heisman-Trophy winner Billy Cannon was scheduled to be inducted into the Hall of Fame, but pleaded guilty to a counterfeiting operation after FBI agents recovered $5 million in bogus $100 bills buried on Cannon's property. Russell chose to rescind the hall of fame invitation. Cannon was eventually inducted in 2008.

== Sense of humor ==
One of Russell's trademarks was his humorous and entertaining style of writing in his columns, books, speeches and stories. He was an unofficial ringleader of a group of friends who engaged in practical jokes, often ingeniously planned. New York Times sports columnist Red Smith said, "He is the first practical joker who never hurt anybody with his practical jokes". Many of these are chronicled in a book about Russell, Confessions of a Practical Joker, written by Jim Harwell. An example is an April Fools joke in 1965: Russell published a story on the front page of the Banner sports page on April 1 (April Fool's Day) reporting that newly passed legislation would mean that the Natchez Trace Parkway would be built directly across the golf course of a Nashville country club of which Russell was a member. It was a skillfully-concocted story with a large map and details containing believable quotes from city officials. Such exaggerated April fools stories had become a yearly tradition in the newspaper at the time.

Russell authored three sports humor books, I'll Go Quietly (1944), I'll Try Anything Twice (1945) and Funny Thing About Sports (1948). During World War II, the American military distributed I'll Try Anything Twice to soldiers as one of 1300 titles in its Armed Services Editions.

== The Banner vs. the Tennessean ==
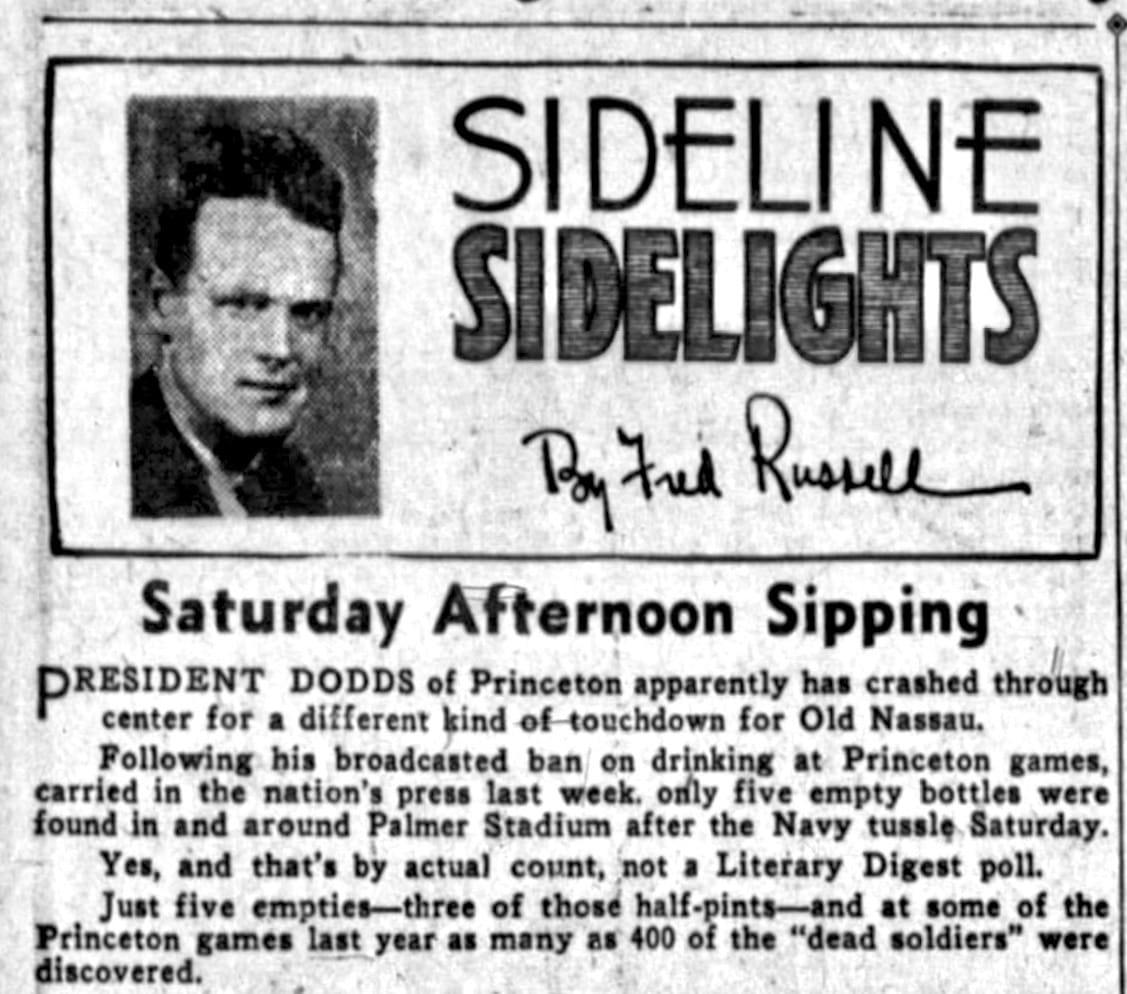
An example of Russell's column in the Nashville Banner, October 29, 1936

In a two-newspaper town, competition between the journalists can be stiff. In Nashville, The Tennessean was the morning paper including Sundays; the Nashville Banner was the afternoon paper. In 1937, the two papers formed a Joint Operating Agreement to reduce costs by putting both in the same building and using the same printing presses. The result was that the competitors kept their separate editorial identities but worked in close proximity; the tension was palpable. Russell, the Banner sports editor, had sources on the inside happenings of Vanderbilt athletics and many more contacts nationally than did the Tennessean. Writing out his columns on his gray manual Royal typewriter, Russell's objectives were clear: get the story, protect your sources, and make sure nothing leaked from Saturday afternoon until Monday morning after the Tennessean hit the stands. If there was going to be a new coach hired, Russell knew it first, and possibly had a role in determining who the candidates would be. Tennessean reporter Jimmy Davy, who endured the underdog status longer than anyone at the Tennessean, said "That kind of influence drove us crazy. . . that he was so inside with everything."

== Influence in various sports ==
In 1955, on Russell's 25th Anniversary of writing at the Nashville Banner, the newspaper held an invitation-only gala for him that included more than 600 guests. The celebration included a host of sports personalities, writers and stars such as Bear Bryant, Red Smith, Bobby Jones, Jack Dempsey, Red Grange; the latter three gave speeches. Invitees included a senator, two congressmen, the mayor, General Neyland, the general manager of the Cincinnati Reds, the president of the Sugar Bowl, the commissioner of the Southeastern Conference, and many coaches and athletes. As for the secret of Russell's success in having friendships with top sports figures, biographer Andrew Derr said, "Confidentiality was the foundation for that type of friendship, and Russell was unwavering in his ability to keep his word". College hall of fame player and coach Johnny Majors said, "You could talk off the record with him and you knew you wouldn't be reported unless he cleared it with you. I would tell something to him that I didn't want anybody else to know at the time. . ."

=== Boxing, horse racing, and golf ===
Russell covered major championship boxing and was a long-time friend of heavyweight champion Jack Dempsey. He covered more than 50 consecutive runnings of the Kentucky Derby. Russell covered the first Masters golf tournament in 1934 in Augusta, Georgia, and over 40 subsequent Masters'. He was a close friend of Bobby Jones (who preferred to be called "Bob"). Russell got to know him before Jones' golfing success, when Jones was a part owner of the Atlanta Crackers, a minor league baseball team. Like Russell, Jones was a great storyteller and this trait was part of the foundation for their friendship.

=== Football ===
Paul "Bear" Bryant was a friend of Russell's for close to a half-century. They first met in 1937 on a four-day train ride from Birmingham to Pasadena when University of Alabama went to play in the 1937 Rose Bowl. Bryant was an unknown at the time who had only recently graduated from the University of Alabama and had stayed on as an assistant coach there. They talked for hours on the trip and Bryant basically told his life story to Russell, who years later said, "I was never more favorably impressed by a young coach as I was by Bryant." Russell helped Bryant get a job as assistant coach at Vanderbilt in 1940. From this initial acquaintance, a friendship developed between the two men and they became trusted confidants over the years. Their wives became close and the couples visited their respective cities in the summer through the 1960s and 1970s. Bryant and his wife usually dined with the Russells before the annual Vanderbilt-Alabama games.

=== Baseball ===
As a baseball writer for 30 years in the middle of the 20th century, Russell often spent an entire month covering spring training in Florida each year. He often traveled with fellow sportswriter Red Smith, and they would frequently stay with players at venues such as the Soreno Hotel in St. Petersburg. After the games, their wives drove to the next town while the two men sat in the back seat with typewriters creating their columns. Sports Illustrated reported that in the 1930s, Russell interviewed Babe Ruth as Ruth played cards with Lou Gehrig. Russell as a young reporter also interviewed Ty Cobb. He spent the majority of his time covering the Yankees, and said "Casey Stengel was better than any show anywhere".

=== Track and field ===
Russell was one of the primary journalists who covered Tennessee State University, an HBCU, whose women's track team, the "Tigerbelles", achieved international acclaim in the 1960 Summer Olympics in Rome. Wilma Rudolph, coached by TSU's Ed Temple, became the first American woman to win three gold medals in a single Olympics. Temple spent the 1950s building his program even though the historically black college had run-down facilities and lacked scholarships. (Note: Rudolph paid for her education by working on the TSU campus two hours each day as part of a work-study program.) After Rudolph's olympic stardom, Temple said, "The biggest disappointment in all my 44 years was when we came back from Rome and [the university] didn't get a cent [for scholarships and facilities]" He confided his frustration to Russell who personally called the Governor of Tennessee, Buford Ellington and arranged for Temple to go downtown and meet with the governor. With Temple sitting in his office, Ellington phoned the commissioner of colleges and conditions at the university began to improve rapidly. When Wilma Rudolph died in 1980, Russell delivered her eulogy.

== Awards and honors ==
Russell received numerous honors from sports organizations throughout his life. He was elected to the National Sports Media Association Hall of Fame and was a charter member of the Tennessee Sportswriters Hall of Fame. He received the Distinguished American Award given by the National Football Foundation (NFF). Two previous recipients were Vince Lombardi and Bob Hope.

Russell is a past president of the Football Writers Association of America. He was a member of the Heisman Trophy Committee for 46 years and served as the Heisman's Southern chairman for 30 years. He received the Amos Alonzo Stagg Award from the American Football Coaches Association. Other winners of this award were Bear Bryant and Woody Hayes. In the same year he was awarded the Bert McGrane Award from the Football Writers Association of America.

In 1983, The National Turf Writers Association (horse-racing) awarded Russell the Walter Haight Award for Excellence in Turf Writing. He received the Associated Press Editor's Red Smith Award for “extended meritorious labor in the art of sportswriting.” He received the first annual "Grantland Rice Memorial Award" (1957) by an organization of journalists, the Sportsmanship Brotherhood, Inc. for "writing in the Grantland Rice Tradition".

Russell was a member of the Tennessee Sports Hall of Fame. He was named to the Vanderbilt Athletics Hall of Fame as part of its inaugural class. Russell was awarded the Distinguished Journalism Award by the U.S. Olympic Committee.

== Legacy ==
Russell's legacy includes the following items named in his honor:

- Fred Russell Distinguished American Award. In 1968, the Middle Tennessee Chapter of the National Football Association and Hall of Fame created the annual "Fred Russell Distinguished American Award" which as of 2021 has had over 50 recipients. Recipients include James F. Neal and Thomas F. Frist Jr. and Martha Rivers Ingram.
- Fred Russell Lifetime Achievement Award. Founded in 1998 by the Nashville Sports Council, this award recognizes a Middle Tennessee area individual for his lifetime contribution to sports. In 2016, the Tennessean received permission from the Nashville Sports Council to combine the Russell award with the presentation of other awards into the newspaper's "Middle Tennessee Sports Awards" event with corporate sponsorship. Previous recipients include Bill Wade and golfer Lou Graham.
- The Fred Russell press box at Vanderbilt Stadium. When Vanderbilt University enlarged its football stadium (formerly called Dudley Field), a $250,000 gift was given to the university by friends of Russell to name the press box at Vanderbilt Stadium in his honor.
- The Fred Russell press box at Hawkins Field. The Vanderbilt Baseball stadium press box, dedicated July 25, 2001, was given by the Mr. and Mrs. Willard Hendrix Foundation in honor of Russell and bears his name.
- The Fred Russell-Grantland Rice Sportswriting Scholarship (See above)

== Personal life and final years ==
Russell and his wife, Katherine Wyche Early Russell, were married for 63 years until her death in 1996. They had four daughters, Katherine Early, Ellen Fall, Elizabeth Lee, Carolyn Evans. Russell worked past the age of 90 and lived until the age of 96. Two personal tragedies that Russell endured in his life were the death of his wife Kay in 1996 and the demise of the Nashville Banner in 1998.Kay died at age 87 when Russell was 90. He lived for six more years. The demise of the Banner came swiftly and painfully on February 16, 1998, when 100 staffers were called together by publisher and co-owner Irby Simpkins who told them that the Banner had been sold to the Gannett Company, who already owned the Tennessean. Gannett would then immediately shut down the 122 year-old Banner which had slowly been losing subscribers. Its last issue would be that Friday, four days hence. The news took an unexpected mental toll on the 92 year-old Russell.His daughter Carolyn said, "When mother died, he still had the column; when the Banner left, he had nothing." Russell went into a deep depression, but over time recovered enough to take a writing job with his longtime rival, the Tennessean, after being respectfully approached by the publisher John Seigenthaler and sports editor John Bibb. Russell wrote a few articles for them, enough to make his 70th year as a journalist, then retired. Long-time Tennessean writer Jimmy Davy said, "You know, he just didn't have his heart in it— he was a Banner man." Russell's final sports column is published in the multi-author book, Nashville: An American Self-Portrait (2001). He died in 2003 at age 96.

== Works by Fred Russell ==
- Big Bowl Football: The Great Season Classics, (1963) with George Leonard
- Bury Me in an Old Press Box, (1955)
- Vol Feats, (1950) with George Leonard
- Funny Thing About Sports, (1948)
- I'll Try Anything Twice, (1945)
- I'll Go Quietly, (1944)
- 50 Years of Vanderbilt Football (1938), by Maxwell E. Benson, Edited by Fred Russell
