= 1921 Vanderbilt Commodores football team =

American college football season

1921 Vanderbilt Commodores football
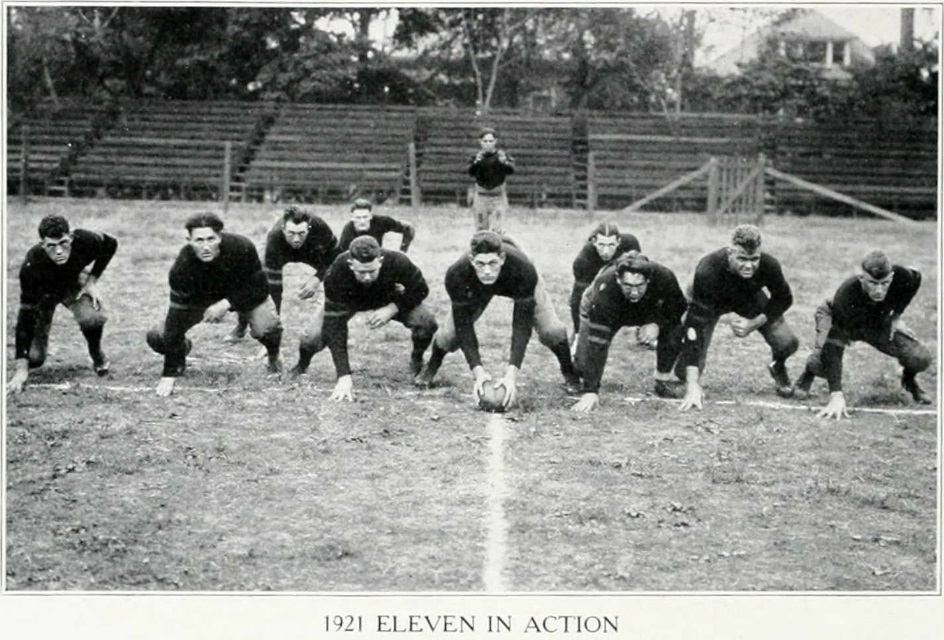
- The 1921 Commodores in a short punt formation

National champion (QPRS) SIAA co-champion
- Conference: Southern Intercollegiate Athletic Association
- Record: 7–0–1 (5–0–1 SIAA)
- Head coach: Dan McGugin (17th season)
- Offensive scheme: Short punt
- Captain: Pink Wade
- Home stadium: Dudley Field

Uniform
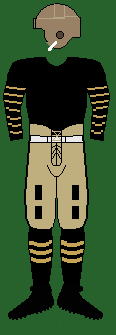

1921 Southern Intercollegiate Athletic Association football standings
	Conf.					Overall
Team	W		L		T	W		L		T
Centre +	5	–	0	–	0	10	–	1	–	0
Georgia +	6	–	0	–	1	7	–	2	–	1
Georgia Tech +	5	–	0	–	0	8	–	1	–	0
Vanderbilt +	5	–	0	–	1	7	–	0	–	1
Tennessee	4	–	1	–	1	6	–	2	–	1
Florida	4	–	1	–	2	6	–	3	–	2
Mississippi College	3	–	1	–	1	7	–	2	–	1
Sewanee	4	–	2	–	0	6	–	2	–	0
Transylvania	2	–	1	–	0	4	–	4	–	0
LSU	2	–	1	–	1	6	–	1	–	1
South Carolina	2	–	1	–	1	5	–	1	–	2
Furman	4	–	2	–	1	7	–	2	–	1
Auburn	3	–	2	–	0	5	–	3	–	0
Mississippi A&M	2	–	3	–	1	4	–	4	–	1
Tulane	3	–	4	–	0	4	–	6	–	0
Alabama	2	–	4	–	2	5	–	4	–	2
Oglethorpe	2	–	4	–	0	5	–	4	–	0
Chattanooga	2	–	4	–	0	4	–	6	–	0
The Citadel	1	–	2	–	1	3	–	3	–	2
Kentucky	1	–	3	–	1	4	–	3	–	1
Ole Miss	1	–	4	–	0	3	–	6	–	0
Howard (AL)	1	–	4	–	0	3	–	6	–	0
Mercer	1	–	5	–	0	3	–	6	–	0
Louisville	0	–	1	–	0	2	–	2	–	1
Wofford	0	–	2	–	0	2	–	7	–	0
Georgetown (KY)	0	–	3	–	0	2	–	6	–	0
Millsaps	0	–	3	–	0	1	–	5	–	1
Clemson	0	–	5	–	2	1	–	6	–	2
+ – Conference co-champions

The 1921 Vanderbilt Commodores football team was an American football team representing Vanderbilt University during the 1921 Southern Intercollegiate Athletic Association football season. It was Dan McGugin's 17th season as head coach, and Wallace Wade's first season as assistant coach. Vanderbilt outscored its opponents 161–21 for a record of 7–0–1 (5–0–1 in conference games) and a share of the Southern Intercollegiate Athletic Association (SIAA) championship. The team's leading scorer was halfback Rupert Smith and its captain was "Pink" Wade, father of future Vanderbilt star Bill Wade. The Commodores played their home games at Dudley Field.

The season included the first of a seven-game series with the Texas Longhorns at the Texas State Fair. It also featured the first time the Kentucky Wildcats were able to score on the Commodores, and the "muddiest game" in Vanderbilt history against rival Sewanee. Vanderbilt tied the Georgia Bulldogs on an onside kick to win a share of the conference title. (Note: Other title claimants included Georgia Tech and Centre, which upset Harvard in a season highlight.) Vanderbilt was the only undefeated contender, and selector Clyde Berryman retroactively awarded the Commodores a national championship.

== Schedule ==
Date	Time	Opponent	Site	Result	Attendance	Source
October 1		Middle Tennessee State Normal*	Dudley Field; Nashville, TN	W 34–0		
October 8	4:30 p.m.	Mercer	Dudley Field; Nashville, TN	W 42–0		
October 15	2:30 p.m.	at Kentucky	Stoll Field; Lexington, KY (rivalry)	W 21–14	5,000	
October 21	2:30 p.m.	at Texas*	Fair Park Stadium; Dallas, TX	W 20–0	15,000	
October 29		Tennessee	Dudley Field; Nashville, TN (rivalry)	W 14–0		
November 5		at Alabama	Rickwood Field; Birmingham, AL	W 14–0		
November 13		Georgia	Dudley Field; Nashville, TN (rivalry)	T 7–7		
November 24	2:00 p.m.	Sewanee	Dudley Field; Nashville, TN (rivalry)	W 9–0		
*Non-conference game; All times are in Central time

== Preseason ==
1921 was Wallace Wade's first year as a full-time assistant coach for the Commodores, and the intensity of their practices had increased since his arrival (the first workout on September 12). Wade had played guard on a Brown Bruins football team which represented the Eastern U.S. in the 1916 Rose Bowl. Before coming to Vanderbilt Wade coached at the Fitzgerald & Clarke School in Tullahoma, Tennessee, where he won a state prep-school championship in 1920 with a 16–3 record. Also moving from Fitzgerald & Clarke were Lynn Bomar, Hek Wakefield, Pos Elam, and Red Williams. Other Commodore players debuting on the team included Putty Overall and Rupe Smith, who played for the Middle Tennessee State Normal School in the years surrounding the First World War. (Note: Overall captained the 1917 Middle Tennessee team and Smith the 1919 squad.)

Returning veterans included Neely, Frank Godchaux, Doc Kuhn, Tot McCullough, Pink Wade, Alvin Bell, Alfred Sharp, and Percy Conyers. (Note: Godchaux, Kuhn, McCullough, and Neely were also on the baseball team – it too won an SIAA championship.) Godchaux was the first player to follow in his father's footsteps as a Vanderbilt football player. (Note: Frank Sr. was a quarterback on the 1899 team.) Captain Pink Wade, father of future Vanderbilt quarterback Bill Wade, moved from fullback to guard. Tackle Tex Bradford had played for Texas Christian University for two years; after sitting out a year at Vanderbilt, he was eligible to play for the Commodores.

According to sportswriter Ferguson "Fuzzy" Woodruff, "While prospects seem fair to middling in most of the big southern colleges, there are two notable exceptions. Dan McGugin expects nothing of Vanderbilt this year. Dan has lost Berryhill, his only reliable backfield man, through the matrimonial route." (Note: Berryhill scored six touchdowns in a 76–0 victory over Tennessee in 1918. Although Berryhill was elected captain of the 1921 team at the end of the previous season, he did not return.) Coach Dan McGugin was elected to the Tennessee state senate, beginning his term in 1921. According to a story on file in the Vanderbilt University Library quoted by Chuck Offenburger, "McGugin didn't want to get involved in politics, but he 'was drafted into service by a citizens committee'".

== Game summaries ==
=== Week 1: Middle Tennessee State Normal ===
Middle Tennessee Normal at Vanderbilt

Team	1	2	3	4	Total
Normal	0	0	0	0	0
• Vanderbilt	6	14	0	14	34

- Date: October 1
- Location: Curry Field
  Nashville, Tennessee

Vanderbilt opened the season at Old Dudley Field against the Middle Tennessee State Normal of Murfreesboro, winning 34–0. The field was at the northeastern corner of the campus, where Wilson Hall, Kissam Quadrangle, and a portion of the Vanderbilt University Law School now stand, adjacent to today's Twenty-First Avenue South. Normal was coached by Alfred B. Miles. Commodore touchdowns were scored by Tot McCullough, Thomas Ryan, Rupert Smith, Percy Conyers, and Alvin Bell. Two extra points were scored by Smith, and one by Bell. During the game, Vanderbilt began using substitutes. The Commodore, Vanderbilt's yearbook, reported on the passing game: "Practically the only thing of note was the aerial efficiency—Kuhn to Ryan and Kuhn to McCullough". Tex Bradford reportedly had to wear street shoes during the game, because Vanderbilt had not yet received cleats large enough to fit him.

=== Week 2: Mercer ===
Mercer at Vanderbilt

Team	1	2	3	4	Total
Mercer	0	0	0	0	0
• Vanderbilt	0	28	7	7	42

- Date: October 8
- Location: Curry Field
  Nashville, Tennessee
- Game start: 4:30 p.m.

In the second week of play Vanderbilt defeated the Mercer Baptists 42–0, Mercer's worst loss of the year. After no first downs in the first quarter Vanderbilt scored four touchdowns in the second quarter on 173 total yards, 91 on two passes. The Baptists were led by second-year head coach Josh Cody. Before the game, Wade told his players "in no uncertain terms that the coaches were disgusted that such ragged material should display no symptoms of fight".

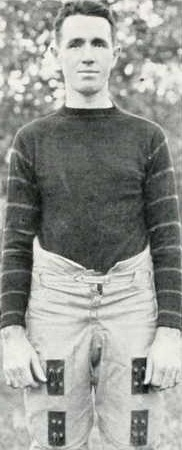
Wallace Wade

The Baptists had sustained injuries in its opening game against the Georgia Bulldogs, (Note: Included among the injured was Mercer lineman and letterman Ike Cowart, who played well in the Georgia game. He was to sit out with a leg infection.) and their practice schedule was hampered by rain. Near the end of the first quarter, Godchaux finally got off a good punt to Mercer's 10-yard line and Tom Ryan made the tackle. Godchaux returned Mercer's punt ten yards, beginning a drive gaining six yards off-tackle. On the next play Doc Kuhn passed to Tot McCullough for twelve yards and first down on the nine-yard line. Rupert Smith ran to the five-yard line, and then to the two. Red Williams fumbled on the next play, but it was recovered by Alfred Sharp in the end zone.

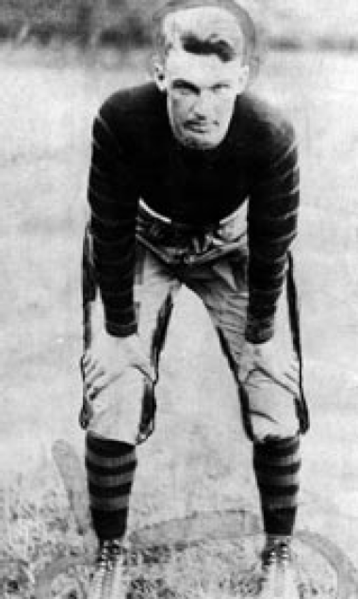
Jess Neely

After a Mercer punt and a return of fifteen yards by Ryan, Vanderbilt began a scoring drive highlighted by Godchaux' 48-yard run around the left end for a touchdown. A Baptist fumble, recovered by Tex Bradford, led to the next touchdown. After Vanderbilt was caught offside, Smith sprinted 11 yards off-tackle and the ball was at Mercer's 16-yard line. Red Williams ran for 12 yards on a split buck play, and Rupe Smith scored a touchdown on the next play. Mercer then ran a fake punt which netted four yards around the left end. The Baptists punted, giving Vanderbilt the ball at their own 39-yard line. After two short gains, Kuhn ran 10 yards from a punt formation and Meiers ran six more off-tackle. The next play was a 55-yard pass from Jess Neely to Tot McCullough for a touchdown, and the half ended with Mercer's 25-yard kick return.

Mercer was again forced to punt in the second half from its 15-yard line, and Neely had a 25-yard return to begin the next scoring drive. Williams reached the five-yard line when he was injured in a tackle, and Lynn Bomar went in as a substitute. On the next series of downs, Meiers scored a touchdown. A long pass was intercepted by Rupe Smith, who returned the ball to his own 35-yard line. Smith ran seven yards, and Bomar crossed the 50-yard line for nine yards and first down. Bomar ran three more yards before Smith ran down to Mercer's 10-yard line. Smith gained a few more on an end run before passing to Ryan for another touchdown. When Mercer again punted, Mixon eluded four tacklers and returned the punt 42 yards before running out of bounds at the Mercer five-yard line. The Commodores failed to score, and the game ended with an exchange of punts. Vanderbilt's starting lineup was McCullough (left end), Bradford (left tackle), Wade (left guard), Sharp (center), Wilson (right guard), Elam (right tackle), Ryan (right end), Kuhn (quarterback), Godchaux (right halfback), Smith (left halfback), and Williams (fullback).

=== Week 3: at Kentucky ===
Vanderbilt at Kentucky

Team	1	2	3	4	Total
• Vanderbilt	14	7	0	0	21
Kentucky	0	14	0	0	14

- Date: October 15
- Location: Stoll Field
  Lexington, Kentucky
- Game start: 2:30 p.m.
- Game attendance: 5,000
- Referee: Ed Finlay

In the third game of the season, the Commodores traveled to Lexington and defeated the Kentucky Wildcats 21–14 in a close game. The Wildcats, coached by second-year head coach William "Indian Bill" Juneau, practiced their signals under cover of night behind closed gates. The Commodores were considered the toughest team on Kentucky's schedule, and it was the most exciting home game for Kentucky fans in some time; a sportswriter called it "the hardest-fought battle that has been staged on the Kentucky gridiron in many a day". According to Bruce Dudley, the Commodores were outplayed by the Wildcats for three quarters. Their opponents completed 10 out of 20 passes, including passes between quarterback Bobby Lavin and Fuller. Before this game, Kentucky had never scored against Vanderbilt; the Commodores were heavy favorites, with a distinct weight advantage. The Lexington Herald reported, "That Nashville is intensely interested in the outcome of the game is evidenced by the fact that a special wire, giving the game play by play, will be installed at the field and connected with the Nashville papers".

Vanderbilt's first two touchdowns came early. After the kickoff went to Kentucky and the Wildcats' Saunders returned the ball to the 30-yard line, a punt was kicked to the Commodores; after a good return but little gain, the ball was punted back to Kentucky. Lavin fumbled on the return, and the ball was recovered by Neely on the 10-yard line. On third down, Frank Godchaux ran around the end for a touchdown; Rupert Smith scored the second and third touchdowns for the Commodores. After an exchange of punts, Vanderbilt began a drive on Kentucky's 32-yard line. Neely passed 22 yards to Pink Wade, with short runs by Smith and Bomar followed by Smith running around right end for a touchdown; Kentucky's Server kicked the ball into the end zone for a touchback. Alfred Sharp was ejected from the game for fighting, and the Commodores were penalized half the distance to the goal. Neely punted the ball to Lavin, who returned the ball five yards. On the next play, Lavin ran around the edge for 19 yards; three plays later, fullback Birkett Pribble carried the ball in for the score.

After a punt by Neely the Wildcats were penalized 10 yards for holding, followed by an unfavorable punt which put the ball at Kentucky's 30-yard line. Punts back and forth sent Vanderbilt closer to midfield. Godchaux made a 20-yard run around the right end, and Tot McCullough caught a 24-yard pass; Smith then skirted around end for the Commodores' final score. The Wildcats' "Slug" Fleahman blocked Neely's punt, giving Kentucky the ball at the 12-yard line, and Lavin wove through the Commodore defense for Kentucky's final touchdown. Late in the game Kentucky threatened to tie the score, but turned the ball over on downs at the two-yard line; Neely sealed the win by running the ball 34 yards to the 36-yard line. Vanderbilt's starting lineup was McCullough (left end), Bradford (left tackle), Lawrence (left guard), Sharp (center), Wade (right guard), Elam (right tackle), Ryan (right end), Godchaux (quarterback), Smith (left halfback), Neely (right halfback), and Williams (fullback).

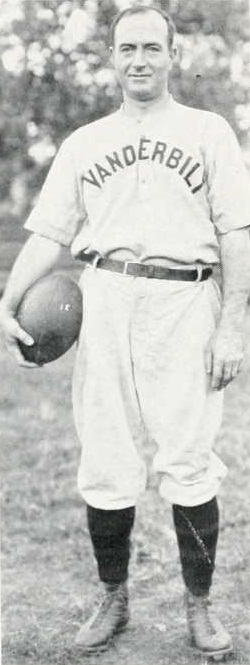
Coach Dan McGugin

=== Week 4: at Texas ===
Vanderbilt at Texas

Team	1	2	3	4	Total
• Vanderbilt	0	7	0	13	20
Texas	0	0	0	0	0

- Date: October 22
- Location: Fair Park Stadium
  Dallas, Texas
- Game start: 2:30 p.m.
- Game attendance: 15,000
- Referee: Ernest C. Quigley

The season's fourth game saw the Commodores, favored to lose by two touchdowns against the Texas Longhorns, pull off a 20–0 upset. According to Edwin Pope's Football's Greatest Coaches, "The Texas game, sparked by McGugin's unforgettable oratory, was the big one; and Vandy got out of the year without a loss". Blinkey Horn, sportswriter for The Tennessean, wrote on "a Turkish bath day which blistered tongues and made legs weary the McGuginites shook off the galling heat and won a hellish battle on a hellish afternoon." The game was the first of a seven-year series, from 1921 to 1928 (except 1924), between Vanderbilt and Texas at the Texas State Fair in Dallas. (Note: In a prior week at the 1921 fair, Boston College had beaten Baylor 23–7 at the first game ever played between teams from the southwest and northeast. The Red River Shootout was played at the fair starting in 1929.) The crowd at Fair Park Stadium was expected to be the largest to watch a game in Dallas. (Note: Montgomery Bell Academy used Vanderbilt's stadium to play Baylor School, and details of the Texas game would be sent over the "wire" to the fans in attendance.)

The Longhorns were coached by Berry Whitaker in his second year as head coach. Texas won the Southwest Conference with an undefeated record in 1920. The 1921 team was arguably the best in Longhorns history, and Vanderbilt football seemed to be in decline when Georgia Tech defeated the Commodores 44–0 the year before.

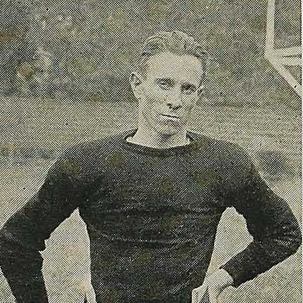
Irby Curry

As Charles Cason writes, "Instead of hammering detailed strategy into them," coach Dan McGugin took his team to the nearby grave of former Vanderbilt quarterback and third-team All-American Irby "Rabbit" Curry in Marlin. Just before the teams took to the field, referring to this grave, McGugin tapped his fingers on the locker room floor and began his noted speech:

You are about to be put to an ordeal which will show the stuff that's in you! What a glorious chance you have! Every one of you is going to fix his status for all time in the minds and hearts of his teammates today. How you fight is what you will be remembered by. If any shirk, the Lord pity him. He will be degraded in the hearts of the rest as long as they live...

On third down near the middle of the second quarter, Texas' Ivan Robertson (with the Commodores' Tom Ryan and Tex Bradford running after him) was intercepted by Vanderbilt captain Pink Wade. Wade returned the interception for 65 yards and the game's first touchdown. In the fourth quarter, Bomar returned an interception for a 40-yard touchdown. The last Vanderbilt scoring drive came later. After a Vanderbilt interception, Texas drew a 30-yard (half the distance to the goal) penalty for slugging. Doc Kuhn completed a pass to Tot McCullough on the eight-yard line. The Longhorn defense held, but was offside on fourth down. This gave the Commodores a first down on the one-yard line, leading to a line plunge for a touchdown by Frank Godchaux.

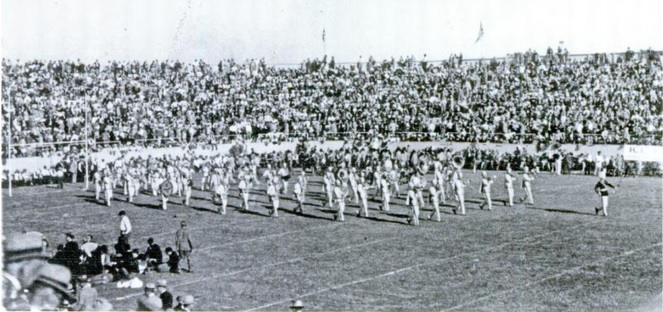
The Longhorns' marching band during halftime

Some Texas supporters blamed its lack of depth on the line for the loss. The Longhorns' passing game was considered satisfactory, going 10 of 31 for 125 yards with five interceptions (two for touchdowns), and some felt that any failure of the passing game could be blamed on the line play. According to Dallas sportswriter Joe Utay, Texas lost because of overconfidence. Blinkey Horn wrote "Vandy outcharged, outfought, and outgamed the boastful Texans. Their courage was finer. Their stamina was greater."

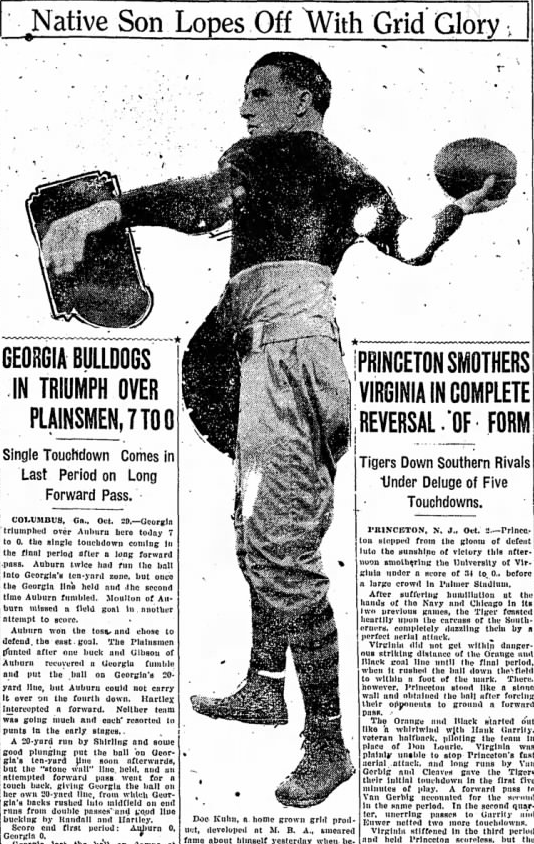
Quarterback Kuhn

Texas punted 10 times to Vanderbilt's 14, and the Commodores completed two out of five passes for 57 yards. Texas intercepted the ball twice, and Vanderbilt five times. The Commodores had six first downs to the Longhorns' eight. Each school netted about $7,500 from the game. Texas's only loss this year was to Vanderbilt. (Note: The Longhorns also tied Southwest Conference champion Texas A&M 0–0 in its final game. The Aggies then upset Centre, which upset Harvard on October 29, for its final game in the Dixie Classic.) The Commodores' starting lineup was Ryan (left end), Elam (left tackle), Wade (left guard), Sharp (center), Bailey (right guard), Bradford (right tackle), Conyers (right end), Godchaux (quarterback), Neely (left halfback), Smith (right halfback), and Bomar (fullback).

=== Week 5: Tennessee ===
Tennessee at Vanderbilt

Team	1	2	3	4	Total
Tennessee	0	0	0	0	0
• Vanderbilt	7	7	0	0	14

- Date: October 29
- Location: Curry Field
  Nashville, Tennessee
- Referee: Oscar Randolph

For the fifth game of the season, Vanderbilt played the Tennessee Volunteers at waterlogged Old Dudley Field. Vanderbilt won 14–0, with Fatty Lawrence and team captain Pink Wade (who had lumbago) sitting out the game. Acting as captain in Wade's absence, Doc Kuhn scored all of Vanderbilt's touchdowns; he "made possible the touchdown by miraculous sidestepping", evading two tacklers. According to Blinkey Horn, the Tennessee coaches "never saw, in all the spying trips, such interference as the Commodores made yesterday for Doc Kuhn". In the first quarter, Kuhn's 19-yard end run made the score 7–0; in the second, he had a 30-yard touchdown run with Lynn Bomar as lead blocker.

During the second half Freddie (Froggie) Meiers carried an onside kick over for a touchdown, but it was called back. The Tennessee backs were repeatedly thrown for no gains or losses all game, and steady improvement by the Commodores was noticed. Vanderbilt's starting lineup was McCullough (left end), Bradford (left tackle), Bailey (left guard), Sharp (center), Overall (right guard), Elam (right tackle), Ryan (right end), Kuhn (quarterback), Smith (left halfback), Neely (right halfback), and Bomar (fullback).

=== Week 6: Alabama ===
Vanderbilt at Alabama

Team	1	2	3	4	Total
• Vanderbilt	7	0	0	7	14
Alabama	0	0	0	0	0

- Date: November 5
- Location: Rickwood Field
  Birmingham, Alabama
- Referee: Ed Finlay

In the sixth week of play, Vanderbilt beat the Alabama Crimson Tide 14–0 in Birmingham. The score reflected predictions, since the Commodores were favored by two touchdowns. Jess Neely played a role in each scoring drive. Early in the first quarter, Vanderbilt had the ball in the middle of the field after an Alabama punt. Two line bucks preceded Neely, who connected with Tot McCullough for a 30-yard pass play. Neely ran for an additional 17 yards, putting the ball on the nine-yard line. After a run by Godchaux, Lynn Bomar bucked over the line for the touchdown.

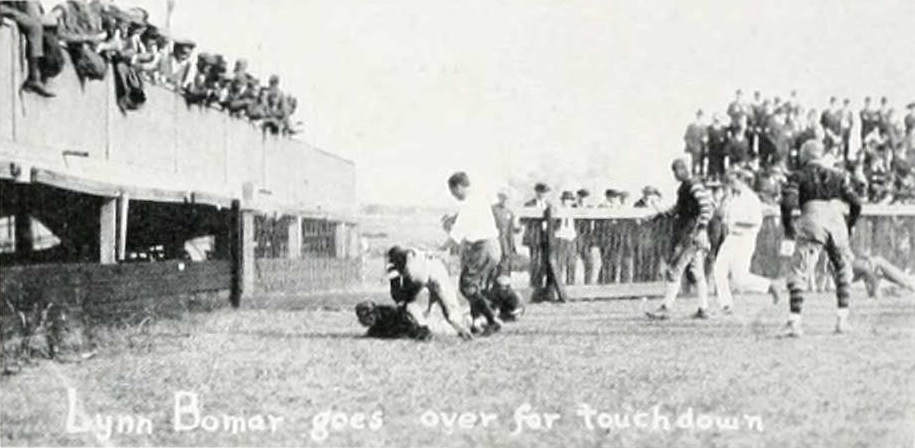
Lynn Bomar's touchdown against the Thin Red Line

Quarterback Doc Kuhn started the second half after sitting out the first because of injuries, invigorating the Commodores. The second scoring drive started when Paul Stumb intercepted a pass. Neely ran for 21 yards around the right end before Kuhn connected with Tot McCullough for a 25-yard pass. Rupe Smith (or Kuhn) then ran the remaining few yards for the touchdown. Alabama had a chance to score, making it to Vanderbilt's 18-yard line. The Commodore defense prevailed, Alabama's forward passes failed, and the ball went over on downs. Other chances included Alabama halfback Rosenfeld intercepting a pass with a clear field ahead of him, returning it 32 yards before Vanderbilt's Red Rountree tackled him from behind. Alabama back Charles Bartlett also returned a punt 25 yards before he was tackled by the last Commodore who could have done so. The Crimson Tide was captained by sophomore end Al Clemens, later captain of the first Alabama team coached by Wallace Wade.

On November 9, between the Alabama and Georgia games, the project for a new stadium at Vanderbilt began with the aid of civic clubs. The Commodores' starting lineup was McCullough (left end), Elam (left tackle), Bailey (left guard), Sharp (center), Overall (right guard), Bradford (right tackle), Ryan (right end), Godchaux (quarterback), Smith (left halfback), Neely (right halfback), and Bomar (fullback).

=== Week 7: Georgia ===
Georgia at Vanderbilt

Team	1	2	3	4	Total
Georgia	0	7	0	0	7
Vanderbilt	0	0	0	7	7

- Date: November 13
- Location: Curry Field
  Nashville, Tennessee

In the seventh week of play, Vanderbilt faced the defending SIAA champion Georgia Bulldogs at Curry Field, and secured a tie against the favored Bulldogs.

Before the game, the match was described by The New York Times as an "important clash"; another source called it a "tooth and toe nail event." Georgia had the best line in the South, featuring four All-Southern players. (Note: Guard Puss Whelchel, center Bum Day, tackle Artie Pew, and end Owen Reynolds.) No team scored through the Bulldogs' line all year. Georgia was in its second year under coach Herman Stegeman. Birmingham News sports editor "Zipp" Newman wrote weeks before the game, "Stegeman has a powerful team and with all the regulars in the game, the team has a chance of going through the season undefeated unless it be Vanderbilt that stops her".

Vanderbilt's record against Georgia was 6–1; its only loss was 4–0, in 1898, and the all-time score was 184–4 in favor of the Commodores. The Bulldogs were favored to win their first meeting since 1912. (Note: In part because they had outplayed Harvard and defeated Auburn earlier in the season.) In the first quarter, both teams were evenly matched. The Commodores had their best chance to score when Thomas Ryan beat the defense, but he dropped Neely's pass. Vanderbilt also had a chance to score when a Georgia field goal was blocked by Lynn Bomar and picked up by Tot McCullough, who was caught from behind before he could score.

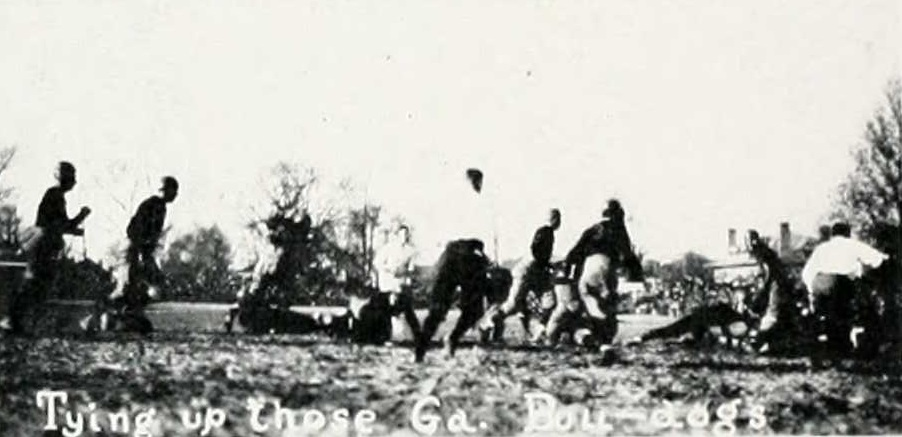
Vanderbilt tying the score

In the second quarter, Georgia outplayed Vanderbilt. The Commodores had two first downs in the first half, both because of Bulldog penalties. A Commodore punt was returned 15 yards by Georgia to the Vanderbilt 30-yard line, and the Bulldogs completed an 18-yard pass from Dick Hartley to halfback Jim Tom Reynolds on Vanderbilt's 12-yard line. After three short gains, Hartley advanced five yards and Vanderbilt was penalized for being offside. Jim Reynolds, gaining a yard or so, went over for the touchdown with a counter on the following series; the close call was disputed. At the end of the half, Georgia had gained 113 yards to Vanderbilt's nine.

The teams were as evenly matched in the third quarter as they had been in the first, with Vanderbilt gaining only two first downs. Soon after the start of the fourth quarter Neely intercepted a pass, weaving for a 25-yard return to Georgia's 40-yard line. Two long pass attempts failed, and Thomas Ryan lined up to punt. Rupert Smith sneaked in behind Ryan, rushing to recover the 25-yard onside kick from scrimmage. Smith jumped up to get the ball from a horde of Bulldogs after they let it bounce, and raced for a 15-yard touchdown. After he added an extra point, the game ended in a 7–7 tie. (Note: One source credits Vanderbilt with the first successful onside kick in the history of football, despite the fact the onside kick was legalized in 1906, and the first one in the South was executed by Auburn against Georgia in 1896.)

Lynn Bomar's play as a linebacker was noted. According to Nashville Tennessean sportswriter Blinkey Horn, "Georgia would have trampled Vanderbilt to atoms but for Lynn Bomar ... [who] was the stellar performer of the game. In the first-half he made two-thirds of the tackles"; Bomar stopped five Georgia touchdowns that day. Tom Ryan's punting was also key to keeping the game close, despite the Bulldogs' 18 first downs. Georgia defeated Alabama and Clemson in the following weeks, giving Vanderbilt and Georgia equal right to the 1921 SIAA title. The Commodores' starting lineup was McCullough (left end), Elam (left tackle), Bailey (left guard), Sharp (center), Wade (right guard), Bradford (right tackle), Ryan (right end), Godchaux (quarterback), Smith (left halfback), Neely (right halfback), and Bomar (fullback).

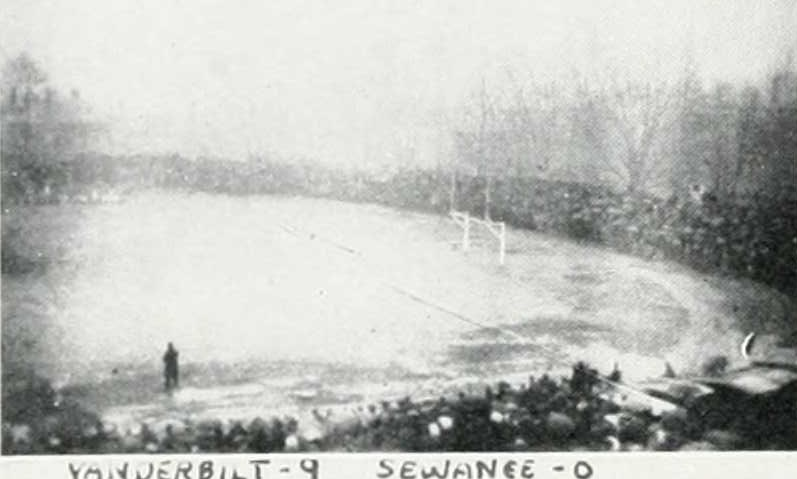
Curry Field during (or after) the Sewanee game

=== Week 8: Sewanee ===
Sewanee at Vanderbilt

Team	1	2	3	4	Total
Sewanee	0	0	0	0	0
• Vanderbilt	0	0	0	9	9

- Date: November 24
- Location: Curry Field
  Nashville, Tennessee
- Game start: 2:00 p. m.
- Referee: Horatio B. Hackett

Vanderbilt ended the season with a 9–0 win over Sewanee in the "muddiest game" in its history. The Commodores, playing in knee-deep mud and water, were unrecognizable. The teams were considered a fairly-even match before the game; although Sewanee felt confident that its line gave it a chance to win, it was apprehensive about Vanderbilt's passing game. Lynn Bomar was injured in the game, which was for bragging rights and the Southern Intercollegiate Athletic Association title.

The game was scoreless until the fourth quarter, when Sewanee fumbled the snap on a punt and the punter was smothered by Jess Neely, Frank Godchaux, and Pink Wade for a safety. Later in the quarter, Henry (Hek) Wakefield punted the ball 54 yards from his own 38-yard line and Pos Elam recovered a fumble by Sewanee's Powers. Wakefield ran in the game's only touchdown, off-tackle from about five yards out. Sewanee had more first downs than Vanderbilt—six to Vanderbilt's two—but also had four successive fumbles. The Commodores' starting lineup was McCullough (left end), Elam (left tackle), Bailey (left guard), Sharp (center), Wade (right guard), Bradford (right tackle), Ryan (right end), Kuhn (quarterback), Smith (left halfback), Neely (right halfback), and Williams (fullback)

== After the season ==
On November 30, Vanderbilt accepted an offer to play the Florida Gators in a postseason game on New Year's Day in Jacksonville, Florida. The regular season ended with four undefeated teams in the South; Centre, Georgia Tech, the Georgia Bulldogs, and Vanderbilt. Centre (which upset Harvard) lost to Texas A&M in the 1922 Dixie Classic, leaving Vanderbilt as the only undefeated team in all its games.

Georgia coach Herman Stegeman, in the section on Southern football in Spalding's football guide, wrote that Vanderbilt had a good year but was unable to play up to its full capabilities and the Commodores should prepare for a fine season the next year. For Stegeman, the contest for the theoretical title of greatest Southern team in 1921 was between Centre, Georgia Tech, and Georgia. Clyde Berryman retroactively listed Vanderbilt as national champion. Lynn Bomar at fullback, Pos Elam at tackle, and Thomas Ryan at end were listed on Walter Camp's list of notable players. Bomar, Elam, Ryan, Tot McCullough, Alfred Sharp, and Pink Wade all made an All-Southern team although, according to the yearbook, Tom Ryan was the only player in the group to appear on an All-Southern team.

== Personnel ==
=== Coaching staff ===
- Dan McGugin (Michigan '03), head coach
- Wallace Wade (Brown '16), line coach
- K. W. McKenzie, manager

=== Varsity letterwinners ===
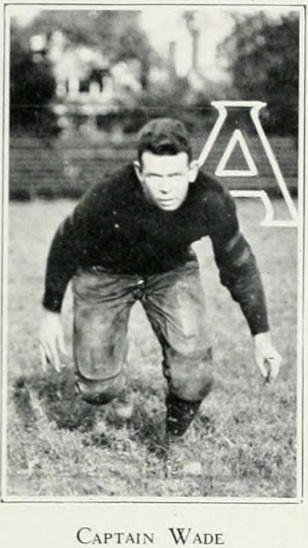
Pink Wade

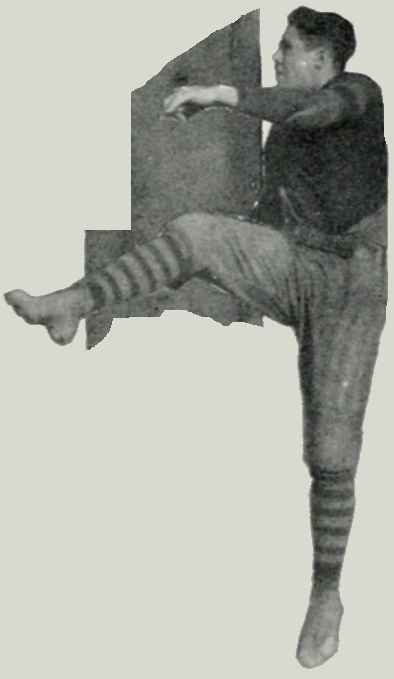
Frank Godchaux

==== Line ====
Number	Player	Position	Games started	Hometown	Prep school	Height	Weight	Age
18	Fats Bailey	Guard	6	Cleveland, Ohio	St. John's Military Academy (WI)		175	
19	Tex Bradford	Tackle	8	Mansfield, Texas	TCU	6'0"	195	22
25	Percy Conyers	End	3	Halls, Tennessee	Union Academy		151	
21	Pos Elam	Tackle	8	Smyrna, Tennessee	Middle Tennessee State Normal		178	
22	Ducky Holmes	Tackle		Whitehaven, Tennessee	McTyeire School		200	
15	Fatty Lawrence	Guard	3	Nashville, Tennessee	Hume-Fogg H.S.	5'7"	194	18
24	Tot McCullough	End	8	Lewisburg, Tennessee		6'4"	180	26
20	Putty Overall	Guard	4	Murfreesboro, Tennessee	Middle Tennessee State Normal		196	
23	Tom Ryan	End	8	Houston, Texas	Central H.S.	6'1"	171	
14	Alfred Sharp	Center	8	Nashville, Tennessee	Hume-Fogg H.S.	6'4"	189	19
	Paul Stumb	Center		Nashville, Tennessee	Montgomery Bell Academy		172	
1	Pink Wade	Guard	6	Nashville, Tennessee	Hume-Fogg H.S.	5'11"	188	22
16	Mizell Wilson	Guard	2	Nashville, Tennessee	Montgomery Bell Academy		160	24

==== Backfield ====
Number	Player	Position	Games started	Hometown	Prep school	Height	Weight	Age
7	Alvin Bell	Quarterback	2	Little Rock, Arkansas	Little Rock H.S		147	20
9	Lynn Bomar	Fullback	6	Gallatin, Tennessee	Fitzgerald and Clarke	6'1"	183	20
	Frank Godchaux	Quarterback	6	New Orleans, Louisiana	Woodberry Forest School (VA)		153	19
2	Doc Kuhn	Quarterback	6	Nashville, Tennessee	Montgomery Bell Academy	5'8"	150	23
10	Freddie Meiers	Halfback	3	Nashville, Tennessee	Georgia Military Academy (GA)		150	
	Hugh Mixon	Halfback	2	Marianna, Arkansas	Polytechnic H.S. (California)		160	
4	Jess Neely	Halfback	8	Smyrna, Tennessee	Branham and Hughes Military Academy		157	23
8	Red Rountree	Halfback	3	Hartselle, Alabama	Morgan County H.S.		142	18
3	Rupert Smith	Halfback	8	Murfreesboro, Tennessee	Middle Tennessee State Normal		158	24
	Hek Wakefield	Fullback	1	Petersburg, Tennessee	Fitzgerald and Clarke	5'10"	155	22
5	Red Williams	Fullback	4	Hernando, Mississippi	Millsaps College		180	

=== Reserves ===
Number	Player	Position	Hometown	Prep school	Height	Weight	Age
	Norton Campbell						
	John Chester		Nashville, Tennessee	Wallace University School			
	John Drennon		Woodbury, Tennessee				
	M. G. Eckhardt		Yorktown, Texas	Austin H. S.			
	Glenn Gentry		Nashville, Tennessee	Hume-Fogg H.S.			
	Dewitt Gordon		Nashville, Tennessee				
	Yoehlee Graves		Scottsville, Kentucky	Western Kentucky State Normal			
	James Hardwick	End	Blacksburg, Virginia	Virginia Polytechnic Institute			
	Frank Katzenstine	Tackle	Birmingham, Alabama	Birmingham–Southern College			
	Sydney Keeble		Nashville, Tennessee	Montgomery Bell Academy			
	Richard D. Kuhn		Nashville, Tennessee	Montgomery Bell Academy			21
	Nat Langford		Springfield, Tennessee				
	Paul Lindsay	Guard	Jacksonville, Florida	Duval H.S.			
	Aubrey Maxwell						
	J. S. McDonnell		Okolona, Mississippi				
	Dana Nance		Suzhou, China				16
	Walter Newman						
	Jakey Peck		Springfield, Tennessee				
	C. A. Perry		Lebanon, Tennessee	Castle Heights Military Academy			
	S. T. Porter	Halfback	Springfield, Tennessee	Peabody Academy			
	William E. Porter	Center	Nashville, Tennessee				
	Bob Rives	Tackle	Hopkinsville, Kentucky	Hopkinsville H.S.			18
	James Sargent	Halfback	Tulsa, Oklahoma	Greenbriar Military School			
	Lawrence Spore		Nashville, Tennessee				
	Red Timberlake						
	B. A. Van Hook						
	George Waller	Halfback	Bessemer, Alabama				
	John Whorley	Halfback	Nashville, Tennessee				
	Roddy Wilson						
	Miles Woods		Nashville, Tennessee	Fitzgerald and Clarke School			

=== Scoring leaders ===
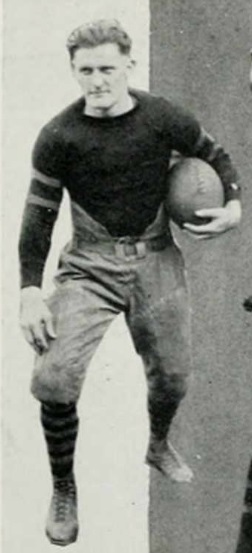
Rupert Smith

Player	Touchdowns	Extra points	Field goals	Safeties	Points
Rupert Smith	5	16	0	0	46
Frank Godchaux	4	0	0	0	24
Lynn Bomar	2	0	0	0	12
Doc Kuhn	2	0	0	0	12
Tot McCullough	2	0	0	0	12
Thomas Ryan	2	0	0	0	12
Freddie Meiers	1	2	0	0	8
Alvin Bell	1	1	0	0	7
Pink Wade	1	1	0	0	7
Hek Wakefield	1	1	0	0	7
Percy Conyers	1	0	0	0	6
Alfred Sharp	1	0	0	0	6
Jess Neely	0	1	0	0	1
N/A	0	0	0	1	2
Total	23	21	0	1	161

=== Depth chart ===
The following chart provides a visual depiction of Vanderbilt's lineup during the 1921 season with games started at the position reflected in parentheses. The chart mimics a short punt formation while on offense, with the quarterback under center.

LE
Tot McCullough (7)
Tom Ryan (1)
James Hardwick (0)

LT	LG	C	RG	RT
Pos Elam (4)	Fats Bailey (4)	Alfred Sharp (8)	Pink Wade (3)	Tex Bradford (4)
Tex Bradford (4)	Pink Wade (2)	William E. Porter (0)	Putty Overall (2)	Pos Elam (3)
Frank Katzenstine (0)	Fatty Lawrence (1)	Paul Stumb (0)	Fats Bailey (1)	Ducky Holmes (0)
Bob Rives (0)			Mizell Wilson (1)	

RE
Tom Ryan (7)
Percy Conyers (1)

QB
Doc Kuhn (3)
Frank Godchaux (4)
Pep Bell (0)

LHB	RHB
Rupert Smith (6)	Jess Neely (5)
Jess Neely (1)	Rupe Smith (1)
Froggie Meiers (0)	Frank Godchaux (1)
Hugh Mixon (0)	Red Rountree (0)
James Sargent (0)	S. T. Porter (0)
George Waller (0)	

FB
Lynn Bomar (4)
Red Williams (3)
Hek Wakefield (0)

== Bibliography ==
- Pope, Edwin (1955). Football's Greatest Coaches. Atlanta: Tupper and Love.
- Vanderbilt University (1922). The Commodore.
- Woodruff, Fuzzy (1928). A History of Southern Football 1890–1928. Vol. 2.
