= Wallace Wade =

American football player and coach (1892–1986)

- Wade circa 1930

Biographical details
- Born: June 15, 1892; Trenton, Tennessee, U.S.
- Died: October 6, 1986 (aged 94); Durham, North Carolina, U.S.

Playing career

Football
- 1914–1916: Brown
- Position: Guard

Coaching career (HC unless noted)

Football
- 1918–1920: Fitzgerald & Clarke School (TN)
- 1921–1922: Vanderbilt (assistant)
- 1923–1930: Alabama
- 1931–1941: Duke
- 1946–1950: Duke

Basketball
- 1918–1921: Fitzgerald & Clarke School (TN)
- 1921–1923: Vanderbilt

Baseball
- 1922–1923: Vanderbilt
- 1924–1927: Alabama

Administrative career (AD unless noted)
- 1923–1930: Alabama
- 1951–1960: SoCon (commissioner)

Head coaching record
- Overall: 171–49–10 (college football); 24–16 (college basketball); 87–45–2 (college baseball)
- Bowls: 2–2–1

Accomplishments and honors

Championships
- 3 National (1925–1926, 1930); 10 SoCon (1924–1926, 1930, 1933, 1935–1936, 1938–1939, 1941)
- College Football Hall of Fame; Inducted in 1955 (profile)

William Wallace Wade (June 15, 1892 – October 6, 1986) was an American football player and coach of football, basketball, and baseball, and college athletics administrator. He served as the head football coach at the University of Alabama from 1923 to 1930 and at Duke University from 1931 to 1941 and again from 1946 to 1950, compiling a career college football record of 171–49–10. His tenure at Duke was interrupted by military service during World War II. Wade's Alabama Crimson Tide football teams of 1925, 1926, and 1930 have been recognized as national champions, while his 1938 Duke team had an unscored upon regular season, giving up its only points in the final minute of the 1939 Rose Bowl. Wade won a total of ten Southern Conference football titles, four with Alabama and six with the Duke Blue Devils. He coached in five Rose Bowls including the 1942 game, which was relocated from Pasadena, California to Durham, North Carolina after the attack on Pearl Harbor.

Wade served as the head basketball and baseball coach at Vanderbilt University for two seasons (1921–1923), tallying a mark of 24–16, while he was an assistant football coach there. He was also the head baseball coach at Vanderbilt from 1922 to 1923 and at Alabama from 1924 to 1927, amassing a career college baseball record of 87–45–2. Wade played football at Brown University. After retiring from coaching, Wade served as the commissioner of the Southern Conference from 1951 to 1960. He was inducted into the College Football Hall of Fame as a coach in 1955. Duke's football stadium was renamed in his honor as Wallace Wade Stadium in 1967.

== Early life and playing career ==
Wade was born in Trenton, Tennessee. He first played football under Tuck Faucett at Peabody High School in Trenton. Wade also attended Chicago's Morgan Park Academy. He went on in 1913 to play football at Brown University. Wade played guard on the Brown football team, which went to the 1916 Rose Bowl. One of his teammates at Brown was Fritz Pollard, who went on to become the first African American coach in the National Football League.

== Coaching career ==
=== Fitzgerald & Clarke ===
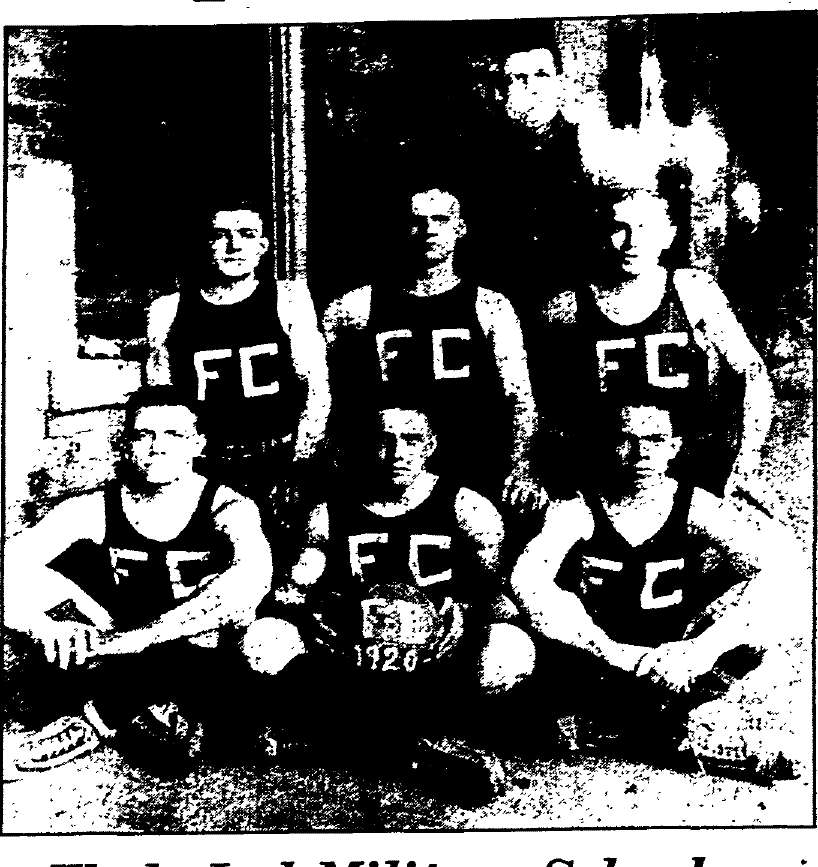
Fitzgerald and Clarke 1920 basketball team. Wade is in back.

After spending time in the Army and rising to the rank of cavalry captain, W. S. Fitzgerald hired him as head coach at the Fitzgerald and Clarke Military School in Tullahoma, Tennessee. He went 15–2 in football, winning a state prep-school championship in 1920. Among his players were future consensus All-Americans Lynn Bomar and "Hek" Wakefield. He also posted successful basketball teams at Fitzgerald–Clarke. '

=== Vanderbilt ===
In 1921 Wade was hired as an assistant and line coach at Vanderbilt University under Dan McGugin. He also coached basketball. (Note: Soon after, on March 14, 1922, Fitzgerald & Clarke burned to the ground and was never rebuilt.) Vanderbilt posted an undefeated 15–0–2 with Wade, and shared conference titles both years he was there.

==== 1921 ====
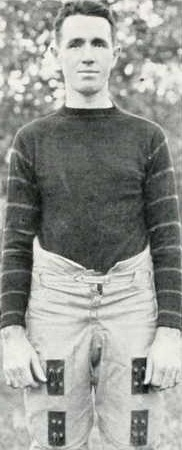
Wade at Vanderbilt, 1921

Defending Southern Intercollegiate Athletic Association (SIAA) champion Georgia was undefeated, having not allowed a score through its powerful line all year. (Note: Its line was composed of four All-Southerns: Joe Bennett, Bum Day, Owen Reynolds, and Puss Whelchel. Jim Taylor was a substitute.) Vanderbilt too was undefeated, and so the game was figured to decide the conference champion. It was described by The New York Times as an "important clash." Sporting editor for the Birmingham News "Zipp" Newman had written weeks ago, "Stegeman has a powerful team and with all the regulars in the game, the team has a chance of going through the season undefeated unless it be Vanderbilt that stops her." The Bulldogs were the favorite to win this meeting of the two schools, first since 1912, in part because the Bulldogs may have outplayed Harvard and defeated Auburn earlier in the season.

Lynn Bomar starred at the linebacker position. "Georgia would have trampled Vanderbilt to atoms but for Lynn Bomar", observed Nashville Tennessean sportswriter Blinkey Horn. His play was again noted, "Lynn Bomar was the stellar performer of the game. In the first-half he made two-thirds of the tackles." It is also said he stopped five Georgia touchdowns that day. The Commodores remained down 7–0 until late into the fourth quarter when Rupert Smith scored on an onside punt. He made the extra point as well and the game ended a tie. Both teams won the rest of their games as expected and remained co-champions.

==== 1922 ====
In 1922, Vanderbilt again went undefeated and its defense ranked top in the nation as measured by points against per game. Vanderbilt held Michigan to a scoreless tie in the inaugural game at the new Dudley Field, including a goal line stand. One account reads "Thousands of cheering Vanderbilt fans inspired the surge of center Alf Sharpe, guard Gus Morrow, tackle Tex Bradford, and end Lynn Bomar, who stopped Michigan cold in four attempts."

=== Alabama ===
After working as an assistant for Vanderbilt, Wade was hired as the head coach at the University of Alabama in 1923. Over the next seven years, Wade's team won three national championships after appearing in the Rose Bowl in 1925, 1926, and 1930. On the hiring, the Athletic Council stated:

Mr. Wade's experience as a football coach has been brilliant and successful. He comes to us with the highest recommendation not only from Vanderbilt and Brown authorities, but also from many of the leading football experts of the South and indeed the entire country. If we rely on expert testimony, the University is fortunate securing a man of Mr. Wade's character, experience, and achievements."

==== 1923–1926 ====
In 1923, Alabama was undefeated in Southern Conference play until upset by the Florida Gators 16–6 in the rain on Thanksgiving Day. Edgar C. Jones scored all of Florida's points. The loss would give Wade's former school Vanderbilt the conference. The 1924 team won the school's first Southern Conference title, suffering its only loss to Centre.

The 1925 team went undefeated and was the first Southern team to win a Rose Bowl. The 1926 Rose Bowl, which Alabama won over Washington 20 to 19, is thus commonly referred to as "the game that changed the south." The 1926 team also went undefeated, tying with Pop Warner's Stanford team in the 1927 Rose Bowl.

==== 1927–1930 ====
Alabama's 13–0 loss to Georgia Tech snapped a 24-game unbeaten streak. Alabama outgained Tech 188–144 in the game, but Tech scored a touchdown in the second quarter and scored another after recovering a fumble at the Alabama 1 with two minutes to go. It was the first time Georgia Tech had scored points on Alabama since 1922. Alabama came from behind in the fourth to beat Mississippi State 13–7 but limped home with three straight losses to end the year at 5–4–1.

Wade was under fire after lackluster seasons in 1928 and 1929, which included narrow losses to Robert Neyland's Tennessee Volunteers. Wade submitted his resignation on April 30, with the caveat that he coach next season. John Suther described the feeling before the Tennessee game that year, which Alabama won 18–6. "Coach Wade was boiling mad. He was like a blood-thirsty drill sergeant anyway, and those critics made him more fiery ... He challenged us to help him shut up the loudmouths that were making his life miserable."

Wade's last Alabama squad outscored their opponents 271–13 over the course of the season and completed a perfect (10-0) campaign with a 24–0 victory over Washington State in the Rose Bowl. The team was voted #1 by several organizations during the pre-AP poll era, and the University of Alabama/Notre Dame split the national championship according to the NCAA/NCAA.com national championship.

=== Duke ===
Following his third national championship, Wade shocked the college football world by moving to Duke University, which had less of a football tradition than Alabama. Though Wade refused to answer questions regarding his decision to leave Alabama for Duke until late in his life, he eventually told a sports historian he believed his philosophy regarding sports and athletics fit perfectly with the philosophy of the Duke administration and that he felt being at a private institution would allow him greater freedom. He brought assistants Ellis Hagler and Herschel Caldwell with him to Duke. In 16 seasons, Wade's Duke teams compiled a record of 110 wins; 36 losses; and 7 ties.

==== 1931–1937 ====
The 1932 team upset Tennessee and featured the State of North Carolina's first All-American in Fred Crawford. The 1933 team won the school's first Southern Conference title, and upset Neyland's Volunteers 10–2. It caused Neyland to say of Crawford: "He gave the finest exhibition of tackle play I have ever seen."

Both Clyde Berryman and James Howell named Duke as a retroactive national champion for 1936.

==== 1938–1941 ====
Wade's most notable season at Duke was in 1938, when his "Iron Dukes" went unscored upon until reaching the 1939 Rose Bowl. In that game, Duke's first Rose Bowl appearance, the "Iron Dukes" lost 7–3 to the USC Trojans. The 1939 team added Dutch Stanley to the coaching staff, replacing Carl Voyles as end coach, and won another SoCon championship.

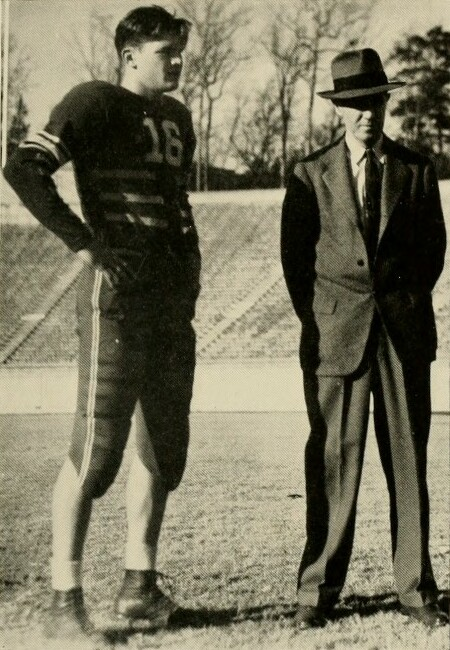
Wade (right) with captain Bob Barnett, 1941

Wade's Blue Devils lost the 1942 Rose Bowl to Oregon State. The game was held at Duke Stadium, the Blue Devils' home stadium in Durham, North Carolina, because the recent attack on Pearl Harbor made the event's organizers skittish of hosting the game in California.

==== World War II ====
Wade entered military service after the 1942 Rose Bowl loss and Eddie Cameron filled in for him as head football coach from 1942 to 1945.

While in the United States Army, Wade was hired to coach a Western All-Army football team that played against National Football League teams before the 1942 NFL season to raise money for the Army Emergency Relief fund. Playing in five games, Wade's team defeated the Chicago Cardinals and Detroit Lions, but lost to the Washington Redskins, Green Bay Packers, and New York Giants.

Along with Neyland's Eastern All-Army team, the games raised $241,392.29 for the fund.

==== 1946–1950 ====
Wade returned to coach the Blue Devils in 1946 and continued until his retirement in 1950.

== Later life and honors ==
From 1951 to 1960 Wade was the commissioner of the Southern Conference. He was inducted College Football Hall of Fame in 1955. In 1967, Duke's football stadium was renamed Wallace Wade Stadium in his honor. Wade died in 1986 in Durham at the age of 94 and was buried in Maplewood Cemetery in Durham.

In 2006, a bronze statue of Wade was erected outside of the University of Alabama's Bryant–Denny Stadium alongside the statues of Frank Thomas, Bear Bryant, Gene Stallings, and now Nick Saban, the other head coaches who led Alabama to national championships.

Duke's student section is named the "Wade Wackos" in Wade's honor; the term is also sometimes used to refer to Duke football fans in general.

=== Coaching tree ===
Wade's coaching tree includes:

1. Paul Burnum
2. Johnny Cain: played for Alabama (1930–1931), head coach for Louisiana–Lafayette. (1937–1941; 1946).
3. Herschel Caldwell: played for Alabama (1925–1926), assistant for Duke (1930–1971)
4. Eddie Cameron, assistant for Duke (1930–1941), head coach for Duke (1942–1945).
5. Al Clemens
6. Russ Cohen, assistant for Alabama (1923–1926), head coach for LSU (1928–1931), Cincinnati (1935–1937).
7. Albert Elmore: played for Alabama (1929–1930), head coach for Troy (1931–1937).
8. Ellis Hagler: played for Alabama (1926–1928), assistant for Duke (1930–1957)
9. Jimmy R. Haygood
10. Orville Hewitt
11. Frank Howard: played for Alabama (1928–1930), head coach for Clemson (1940–1969)
12. Pooley Hubert: played for Alabama (1922–1925), head coach for Southern Miss (1931–1936), VMI (1937–1946).
13. Garland Morrow: played for Vanderbilt (1922), head coach for Cumberland (1932–1935).
14. Jess Neely: played for Vanderbilt (1921–1922), assistant for Alabama (1928–1930), head coach for Clemson (1931–1939), Rice (1940–1966).
15. Putty Overall: played for Vanderbilt (1921), head coach for Tennessee Tech (1923–1946).
16. Clyde Propst: played for Alabama (1922–1924), assistant for Alabama (1925–1932), head coach for Howard (1934), Rhodes (1935–1937).
17. Tommy Prothro: played for Duke (1938–1941), head coach for Oregon State (1955–1964), UCLA (1965–1970), Los Angeles Rams (1971–1972), and San Diego Chargers (1974–1978).
18. Dutch Stanley, assistant for Duke (1939–1946)
19. William T. Van de Graaff: assistant for Alabama (1921–1926), head coach for Colorado College (1926–1939).
20. Carl Voyles: assistant coach for Illinois (1925–1930), ends coach for Duke (1931–1938), head coach for William & Mary (1939–1943), head coach for Auburn (1944–1947), head coach for Brooklyn Dodgers (1948), head coach for Hamilton Tiger Cats (1950–1955).
21. Hek Wakefield: played for Vanderbilt (1921–1924), assistant for Vanderbilt (1925–1928).
22. Jennings B. Whitworth: played for Alabama (1930–1931), head coach for Oklahoma State (1950–1954), Alabama (1955–1957).

== Head coaching record ==
=== College football ===
Year	Team	Overall	Conference	Standing	Bowl/playoffs	Coaches^{#}	AP^{°}
Alabama Crimson Tide (Southern Conference) (1923–1930)
1923	Alabama	7–2–1	4–1–1	2nd			
1924	Alabama	8–1	5–0	1st			
1925	Alabama	10–0	7–0	T–1st	W Rose		
1926	Alabama	9–0–1	8–0	1st	T Rose		
1927	Alabama	5–4–1	3–4–1	10th			
1928	Alabama	6–3	6–2	5th			
1929	Alabama	6–3	4–3	5th			
1930	Alabama	10–0	8–0	T–1st	W Rose		
Alabama:		61–13–3	45–10–2				
Duke Blue Devils (Southern Conference) (1931–1941)
1931	Duke	5–3–2	3–3–1	T–8th			
1932	Duke	7–3	5–3	9th			
1933	Duke	9–1	4–0	1st			
1934	Duke	7–2	3–1	T–3rd			
1935	Duke	8–2	5–0	1st			
1936	Duke	9–1	7–0	1st			11
1937	Duke	7–2–1	5–1	4th			20
1938	Duke	9–1	5–0	1st	L Rose		3
1939	Duke	8–1	5–0	1st			8
1940	Duke	7–2	4–1	2nd			18
1941	Duke	9–1	5–0	1st	L Rose		2
Duke Blue Devils (Southern Conference) (1946–1950)
1946	Duke	4–5	3–2	5th			
1947	Duke	4–3–2	3–1–1	4th			19
1948	Duke	4–3–2	3–2–1	7th			
1949	Duke	6–3	4–2	T–4th			
1950	Duke	7–3	5–2	6th			
Duke:		110–36–7	68–18–3				
Total:		171–49–10					
National championship Conference title Conference division title or championship game berth
^{#}Rankings from final Coaches Poll.; ^{°}Rankings from final AP Poll.

=== College basketball ===
Record table
Season	Team	Overall	Conference	Standing	Postseason
Vanderbilt Commodores (Southern Intercollegiate Athletic Association) (1921–1923)
1921–22	Vanderbilt	8–8			
1922–23	Vanderbilt	16–8			
Vanderbilt:		24–16 (.600)			
Total:		24–16 (.600)			
