= Thomas Ryan (American football) =

American football and basketball player

No. 6, 23
- Positions: End, Fullback, punter

Personal information
- Born: Crowley, Louisiana, U.S.
- Listed height: 6 ft 1 in (1.85 m)
- Listed weight: 190 lb (86 kg)

Career information
- High school: Central (Houston)
- College: Vanderbilt (1920–1921; 1923–1924)

Awards and highlights
- All-Southern (1921, 1924); All-Southern (basketball, 1922); SIAA championship (1921); Porter Cup (1922); SoCon championship (1923)

Thomas Francis Ryan was a college football and basketball player.

== Vanderbilt University ==
Ryan was a prominent end and fullback and punter for Dan McGugin's Vanderbilt Commodores football team of the Vanderbilt University from 1920 to 1921 and 1923 to 1924. He was also a guard on the basketball team, selected All-Southern by some writers in 1922.

=== 1921 ===
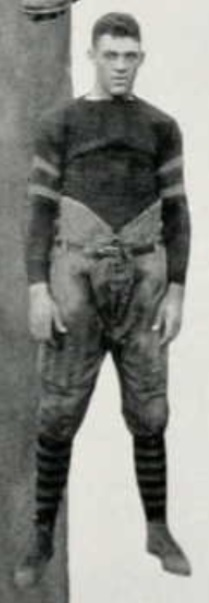
Ryan c. 1921.

In a 34–0 victory over Middle Tennessee State Normal, The Commodore, Vanderbilt's yearbook, reported the lone plus of the passing game, stating "Practically the only thing of note was the aerial efficiency—Kuhn to Ryan and Kuhn to McCullough." The Commodores upset the Texas Longhorns 20–0. On a third down, at some point near the middle of the second quarter, Texas' Ivan Robertson, with the Commodores' Tom Ryan and Tex Bradford running after him, threw a pass not near a single Longhorn; which was intercepted by Vanderbilt's captain Pink Wade. Wade returned the interception for 65 yards and the first touchdown of the game. In the effective Southern Intercollegiate Athletic Association (SIAA) championship game, Vanderbilt tied the favored Georgia Bulldogs in the final quarter using a trick onside punt kicked by Ryan. Ryan lined up to punt. Rupert Smith sneaked in behind Ryan, and rushed to recover the 25-yard onside kick. Smith jumped up to get the ball off the bounce among a hoard of Bulldogs, after they had let it bounce, including the outstretched arms of the Bulldogs' Hartley, and raced for a 15-yard touchdown. Vanderbilt therefore tied for a conference title. Ryan was on Walter Camp's list of all players worthy of mention.

=== 1922 ===
Ryan did not return for the 1922 season, preferring to stay an adjunct of the oil industry in Tampico, Mexico.

=== 1923 ===
The school's last football conference title to date came in 1923. In the 3–0 loss to national champion Michigan, Ryan had a fine game, out-punting the famed Harry Kipke.

=== 1924 ===
Vanderbilt beat Georgia Tech in Atlanta for the first time since 1906 on a Hek Wakefield drop kick. The punting battle between Doug Wycoff and Ryan was one of the few noted features of the game. The first touchdown drive of the 16–0 win over Minnesota ended when Ryan broke through a hole created by Bob Rives, finishing a 63-yard march. Ryan was selected All-Southern by his teammates.
