= Fatty Lawrence =

American football player

- Born: May 6, 1903; Murfreesboro, Tennessee, U.S.
- Died: August, 1976 (aged 73); Nashville, Tennessee, U.S.
- Occupations: head of Nashville’s Water and Sewerage Services Department
- Football career

No. 19, 15
- Position: Guard

Personal information
- Listed height: 5 ft 7 in (1.70 m)
- Listed weight: 195 lb (88 kg)

Career information
- High school: Hume-Fogg
- College: Vanderbilt (1921–1924)

Awards and highlights
- SIAA championship (1921); SoCon championship (1922, 1923)

Robert Landy "Fatty" Lawrence (May 6, 1903 – August, 1976) was a college football player who went on to become the superintendent of Nashville’s Water and Sewerage Services Department from 1932 to 1971; namesake of the Robert L. Lawrence Jr., Filtration Plant. He was the father of United States Navy vice admiral William P. Lawrence and the grandfather of NASA astronaut Wendy Lawrence.

== Vanderbilt University ==
Lawrence was a prominent guard for Dan McGugin's Vanderbilt Commodores football team of Vanderbilt University from 1921 to 1924. He was a part of three conference titles.

=== 1922 ===
In the second week of play of 1922 against Henderson-Brown, Vanderbilt won 33 to 0. Lawrence recovered a fumble in the end zone for Vanderbilt's fourth touchdown. Lawrence also intercepted a pass in the scoreless tie with Michigan. He was mentioned as one of the players of the game in the 14 to 6 victory over Tennessee. The Nashville Banner said Lawrence had been "in there doing a man's job blocking a kick and tackling with the deadliness of a tiger unleashed in a cave of lions."

=== 1924 ===
He was selected All-Southern by his teammates.
