= Pink Wade =

American football player (1899–1966)

William Wade
Profile
- Position: Guard/Fullback

Personal information
- Born: August 18, 1899; Clarksville, Tennessee, U.S.
- Died: March 1, 1966 (aged 66); Nashville, Tennessee, U.S.
- Listed height: 5 ft 11 in (1.80 m)
- Listed weight: 188 lb (85 kg)

Career information
- High school: Hume-Fogg
- College: Vanderbilt (1919–1921)

Awards and highlights
- SIAA championship (1921); All-Southern (1921)

William James "Pink" Wade (August 18, 1899 – March 1, 1966) was an American football player for the Vanderbilt Commodores of Vanderbilt University. Wade was the captain of the 1921 SIAA champion Vanderbilt football team. He was the father of quarterback Bill Wade.

== College football ==
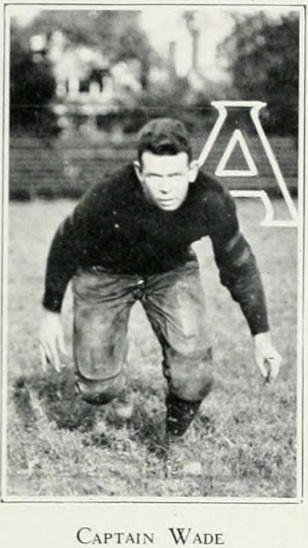
Pink c. 1921

=== 1921 ===
Pink Wade was captain of the 1921 Vanderbilt Commodores football team. Wade played a part in the drive which resulted in the second touchdown of a 21 to 14 victory over Kentucky. Following an exchange of punts, Vanderbilt started a drive on Kentucky's 32-yard line. Jess Neely connected with Pink Wade on a 22-yard pass. Rupert Smith would run for a gain of some seven yards. A slight gain by Lynn Bomar was then followed by Rupert Smith running around right end for a touchdown. The next game pitted Vanderbilt against Texas. Vanderbilt upset the Longhorns 20 to 0. The first score came thus: On a third down, at some point near the middle of the second quarter, Texas' Ivan Robertson, with the Commodores' Tom Ryan and Tex Bradford running after him, threw a pass not near a single Longhorn; which was intercepted by Wade. Wade returned the interception for 65 yards and the touchdown. Wade did not play in the following game against the Tennessee Volunteers due to a case of lumbago. Doc Kuhn served as captain in his absence and scored all of Vandy's touchdowns in the 14 to 0 victory. To decide the conference champion, Vanderbilt tied the Georgia Bulldogs 7 to 7. In the game with Sewanee to finish the season, the Commodores won 9 to 0. The game went scoreless until the fourth quarter, when Sewanee fumbled the snap on a punt and the punter was smothered by Neely, Frank Godchaux, and Wade for a safety. A touchdown was scored later by Hek Wakefield. The regular season closed with four undefeated teams in the south: Centre, Georgia Tech, Georgia, and Vanderbilt. Centre, which upset Harvard, lost to Texas A&M in the 1922 Dixie Classic, leaving Vanderbilt as the only one of those four undefeated in all its games. Georgia coach Herman Stegeman, in the section on southern football in Spalding's football guide, wrote that Vanderbilt had a good year, but was unable to play up to its full capabilities; and that the Commodores should prepare for a fine season the next year. For Stegeman, the contest for the mythical title of the greatest southern team in 1921 was between Centre, Georgia Tech, and Georgia. Clyde Berryman listed Vanderbilt as national champion.
