= Pos Elam =

American football player

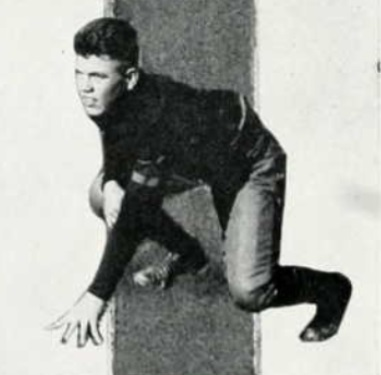
- Elam in 1921.

No. 21
- Position: Tackle

Personal information
- Born: Smyrna, Tennessee, U.S.
- Listed weight: 178 lb (81 kg)

Career information
- College: Vanderbilt (1921)

Awards and highlights
- SIAA championship (1921); All-Southern (1921); All-America Honorable Mention

Frank "Pos" Elam was a college football player.

== Middle Tennessee State ==
He attended Middle Tennessee State Normal School before and after his year at Vanderbilt.

== Vanderbilt University ==
Elam was a prominent tackle for Dan McGugin's Vanderbilt Commodores football team of Vanderbilt University. He was a member of the Delta Tau Delta fraternity.

=== 1921 ===
Elam recovered a fumble in the Sewanee game of 1921 to set up the game's only touchdown, scored by Hek Wakefield. Elam was on Walter Camp's list of all players worthy of mention. He was selected All-Southern by George A. Butler of the Chattanooga News.
