= Ellis Hagler =

American football player and sports coach (1908–1990)

Biographical details
- Born: May 2, 1908; Barbour County, Alabama, U.S.
- Died: September 21, 1990 (aged 82); Durham, North Carolina, U.S.

Playing career
- 1926–1928: Alabama
- Position: Guard

Coaching career (HC unless noted)
- 1930–1957: Duke (assistant)

Accomplishments and honors

Championships
- National (1926)

Awards
- All-Southern (1928); North Carolina Sports Hall of Fame

Ellis Pruitt "Dumpy" Hagler (May 2, 1908 – September 21, 1990) was an American college football player and coach. He also coached golf. He played and coached football under Wallace Wade. Hagler was president of the NCAA Golf Coaches Association, chairman of the Southern Conference and Atlantic Coast Conference Golf Committees, and a member of the NCAA All-America selection committee.

== University of Alabama ==
Hagler was a prominent guard for Wallace Wade's Alabama Crimson Tide football teams of the University of Alabama. He was selected All-Southern in 1928.

== Duke ==
=== Football ===
He followed his coach Wade and fellow assistant Herschel Caldwell to Duke University as an assistant and line coach for the Duke Blue Devils football teams. World War II interrupted Wade's tenure, and Hagler continued as an assistant under Eddie Cameron.

His most famous unit was the 1938 front seven, who were nicknamed the "Iron Dukes." They went through the entire regular season without allowing a single score. Hagler's trophy received for an appearance in the 1942 Rose Bowl, the only one played outside of Pasadena, was found in the trash and resides at the North Carolina Sports Hall of Fame.

=== Golf ===
Hagler produced 18 conference champions as a golf coach, coaching from 1933 to 1973.
