= 1922 Michigan vs. Vanderbilt football game =

1922 Michigan Wolverines vs. Vanderbilt Commodores football game
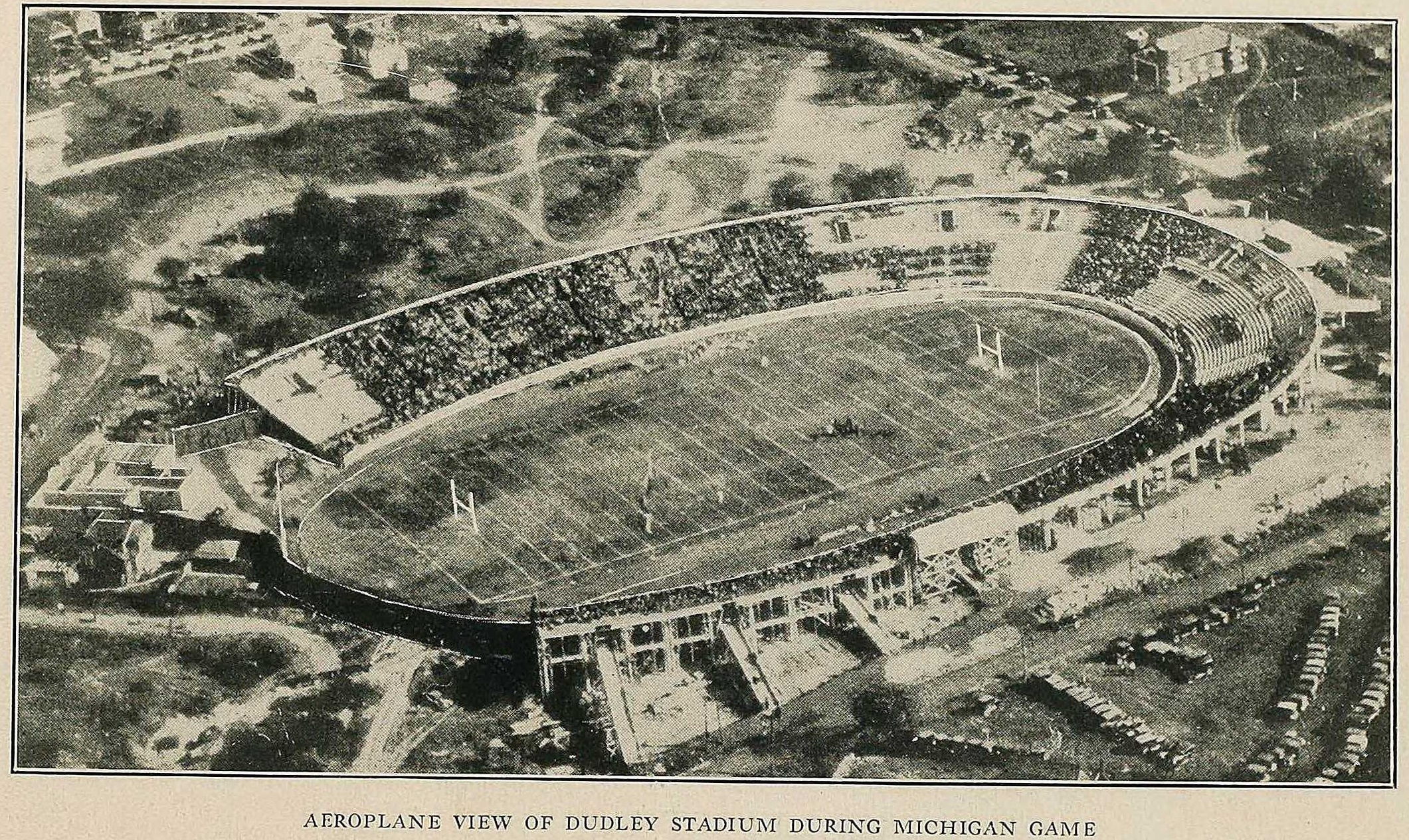
Michigan Wolverines	Vanderbilt Commodores
(1–0)	(2–0)
0	0
Head coach: Fielding H. Yost	Head coach: Dan McGugin
	1	2	3	4	Total
Michigan	0	0	0	0	0
Vanderbilt	0	0	0	0	0
- Date: October 14, 1922
- Season: 1922
- Stadium: Dudley Field
- Location: Nashville, Tennessee
- Referee: Horatio B. Hackett
- Attendance: 16,000

The 1922 Michigan vs. Vanderbilt football game, played October 14, 1922, was a college football game between the Michigan Wolverines and Vanderbilt Commodores. The game ended as a scoreless tie. It was the inaugural game at Dudley Field (now known as Vanderbilt Stadium), the first dedicated football stadium in the South.

== Prior meetings ==
The game matched Michigan head coach Fielding H. Yost against his former player and brother-in-law Dan McGugin. Owing to the relationship between Yost and McGugin, the two teams played nine times between 1905 and 1923, with Michigan winning eight times. This 1922 meeting between the schools was the first since 1914. McGugin learned what he knew of the game of football while playing under Yost as a guard on Michigan's "point-a-minute" offense, and it was Yost who recommended McGugin for the Vanderbilt job in 1904.

Between 1905 and 1907, Vanderbilt lost only three games – all three of them to Michigan. The loss in 1907 stopped a 26-game home win streak.

For the first ever meeting in 1905, Vanderbilt traveled to Ann Arbor and suffered its only loss, 18 to 0. On the even of the 1906 game, 4,200 students attended a mass meeting at University Hall. McGugin and Yost both spoke to the crowd and agreed that the game would be one of the closest played in Ann Arbor in many years. D. G. Fite, father-in-law of both McGugin and Yost, traveled from his home in Tennessee to watch the game. John Garrels put Michigan ahead with a field goal from the 25-yard line. On the preceding drive, Garrels had completed a 15-yard forward pass to Bishop, the first legal forward pass completed by Michigan under the new rules. Michigan led, 4–0, at halftime. Early in the second half, Vanderbilt tied the score with a field goal by Dan Blake from the 30-yard line. With two minutes left in the game, Garrels ran 68 yards for a touchdown. The Chicago Daily Tribune wrote: "Garrels, on a fake kick, with splendid interference by Hammond, Curtis, and Workman, ran Vanderbilt's left end at lightning speed for sixty-eight yards and a touchdown." Michigan won 10 to 4.

Despite the loss, Innis Brown rated the 1906 Vanderbilt team as the best the South ever had. For some, Vanderbilt's eleven was the entire All-Southern team. On November 2, 1907, Michigan defeated Vanderbilt 8–0, in front of 8,000 at the Old Dudley Field (referred to as Curry Field following the building of the new stadium in 1922) in Nashville. The crowd was the largest up to that date to see a football game south of the Mason–Dixon line. Bradley Walker officiated his first Michigan–Vanderbilt game. The game was "a big society event in the south", and the elite of Nashville, Chattanooga, and Memphis were in attendance. Students from every college and preparatory school in Tennessee, including Belmont College and "other seminaries", also attended the game. Vanderbilt was hampered by sophomores in 1908 and Michigan won the game at Ferry Field 24–6.

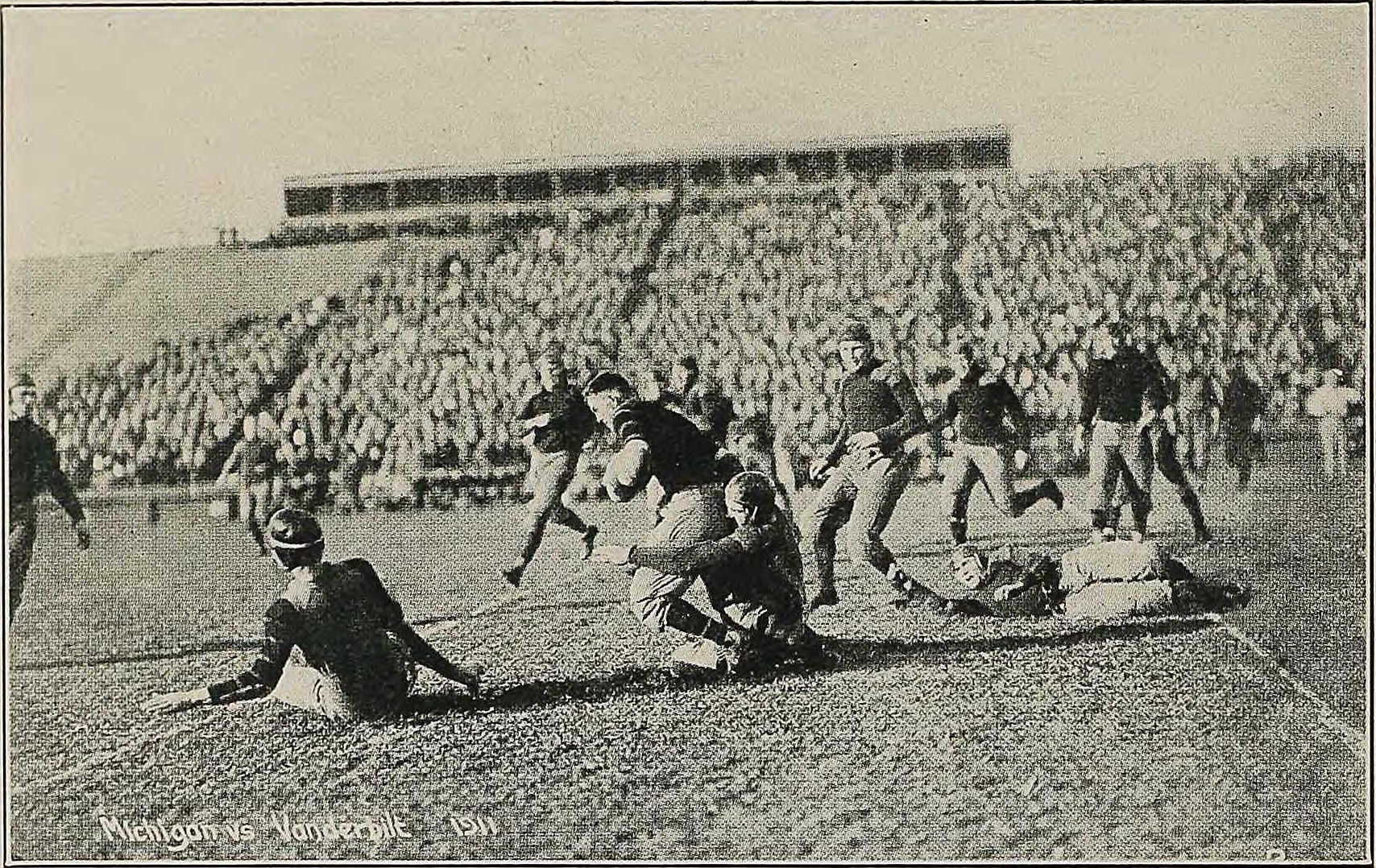
Vandy's Ray Morrison running against Michigan in 1911.

Before the 1911 game, Coach Yost reminded reporters that Vanderbilt's 1911 team included the same veteran line that had held Yale scoreless in 1910. Yost predicted a hard game.

Thomas A. Bogle, Jr. of Michigan attempted two field goals in the first half, but both kicks were blocked. After a scoreless first half, each team kicked a field goal in the third quarter. Zach Curlin kicked Vanderbilt's field goal after Shorty McMillan fumbled a punt, and Vanderbilt recovered the ball at Michigan's 27-yard line. Later in the quarter, McMillan carried the ball 33 yards to the Vanderbilt 10-yard line on a quarterback run. Frederick L. Conklin then place-kicked a field goal from the 19-yard line. In the fourth quarter, Stanfield Wells ran five yards for a touchdown, and Conklin kicked the extra point to give Michigan a 9-3 lead. Vanderbilt responded with a Ray Morrison touchdown, but the extra point failed due to a high kickout by Morrison. In the Detroit Free Press, E. A. Batchelor wrote: "Vanderbilt's failure to execute properly one of the simplest plays in the football catalogue was all that saved Michigan from the humiliation of a tie score with Dan McGugin's peppery Dixie lads this afternoon." Michigan had its greatest victory over Vanderbilt in 1913, 33–2. Batchelor wrote: "Vanderbilt fairly gasped in amazement as the Wolverines shot the ball from one to another with the precision of baseball players." Michigan won 23–3 in 1914.

== Dudley Field ==
This was Vanderbilt's first game in its new steel and concrete stadium, Dudley Field. The field was named after William Lofland Dudley, once Chair of Chemistry at Vanderbilt University, and an instrumental figure in the organization of the Southern Intercollegiate Athletic Association; as well as a member of the Executive Committee of the National Collegiate Athletic Association and the Football Rules Committee. He was known as the 'father of Vanderbilt football.' The eponymous stadium cost some $200,000 and could seat up to 22,600 people.

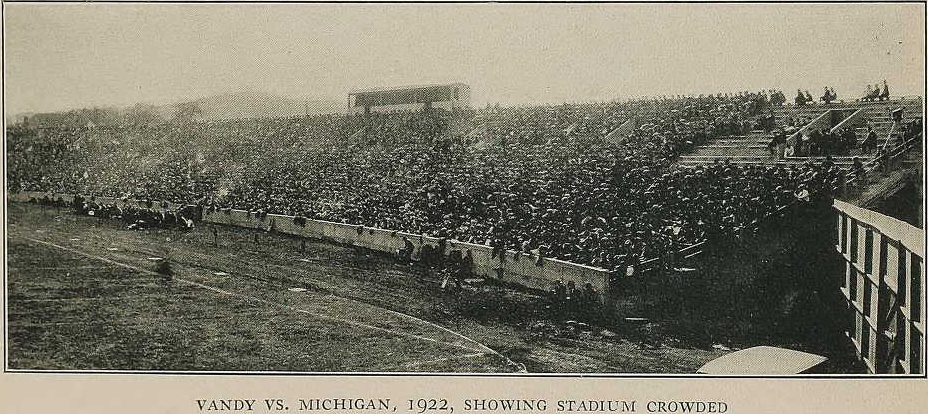
The crowded stadium.

The first of its kind in the South, the dedication of Dudley Field saw much fanfare. A parade of floats and bands marched through the streets, and Cornelius Vanderbilt IV, the great-great grandson of the university's namesake, made an appearance. Three airplanes flew over the stadium as the Vanderbilt band played 'America.' Governor Alf Taylor welcomed the visiting Wolverines, with a response in turn from Michigan coach Fielding H. Yost. The dedication of the stadium followed:

To William Lofland Dudley, Dean of Southern Athletics, scholar, gentleman, and friend, this ground is dedicated, and, as Dudley Field, is consecrated to the use of Vanderbilt and her sons forever.

— Prof. C. S. Brown President of the Vanderbilt Athletic Association

Lt. Herbert Fox of the 136th Air Squadron circled back, flying over the northern goal posts, and dropped a decorated football onto the field which Coach McGugin caught off a single bounce. He then handed the ball to Yost. This was just the second time Vanderbilt played Michigan at home.

The more optimistic Vanderbilt faithful were excited at the prospect of end Scotty Neill reporting after a year's layoff. His ability at punting the ball was especially noted. The Commodores' lone advantage going into the game was their speed, perhaps not unlike today when teams play Southern schools. During the pregame talk in his dressing room, Coach McGugin famously said "You are going against Yankees, some of whose grandfathers killed your grandfathers in the Civil War." Also reported, probably more accurately, as "Out there lie the bones of your grandfathers;" referring to a nearby military cemetery, "And down on that field are the grandsons of the Yankee soldiers who put them there." One may add the often cited, humorous addendum that McGugin's father was an officer in the Union Army.

== Background ==
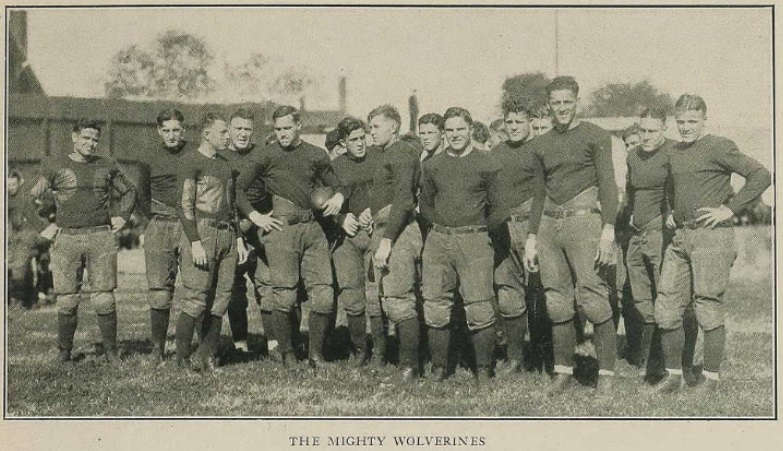

The Wolverines were a national power, and the heavy favorite to win the game. Michigan had beaten Vanderbilt in all prior meetings, and were to have the much healthier lineup. Michigan captain Paul Goebel rested his hurt knee by not playing against Case Scientific School. Only one spot in the lineup could be said to give Michigan trouble, guard Eddie Johns was forced to sit out due to academic probation. Harold Steele was to replace him.

Vanderbilt, however, felt its lineup was not at full strength. Vanderbilt end Percy Conyers had a rather badly hurt knee, and center Alf Sharpe had just hurt his shoulder. End Lynn Bomar was fighting through a pulled tendon, and end Tot McCullough had some kind of strain in his arm leading to noticeable swelling. Quarterback Doc Kuhn was trying to overcome a sickness, including fevers which kept him from practice. Captain Jess Neely also had an injured left arm. Conyers and Sharpe were expected to start the game on the sidelines. Last year's starting end Thomas Ryan not returning for the Michigan game was also taken bitterly by Vanderbilt's fans. Vanderbilt was also working to remedy problems seen in earlier weeks with its line.

== Game summary ==
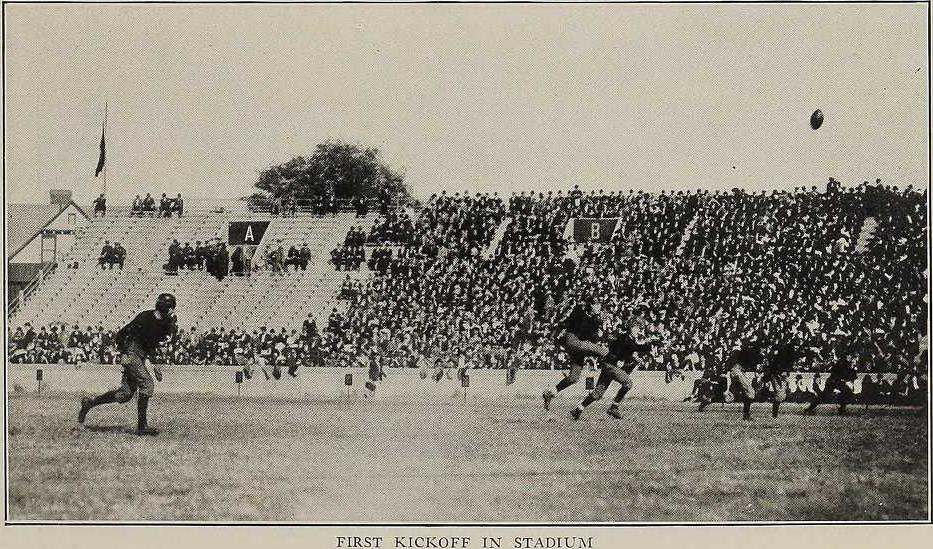
Lynn Bomar with the opening kickoff.

The game saw little offense, featuring the season's top two defenses as measured by points against per game. Vanderbilt punted 17 times, and Michigan punted 10 times. Some were surprised with Michigan's lack of an offense, citing it as Michigan's best feature. For the entire game, Michigan made only six first downs, with two off of penalties, while Vanderbilt made just one. Michigan's consensus All-American halfback Harry Kipke, had been rendered moot for most of the game. (Note: Kipke once later said about this game, "I picked myself up very, very painfully from every blade of grass in the place.") Fullback Franklin Cappon seemed the only Michigan player able to gain much for his offense.

First half:

Michigan captain Paul Goebel won the toss and chose the south goal. Vanderbilt decided to kick. Kipke made a first down on the first drive, which started from his own 30-yard line, but Michigan punted the ball away soon after. Vanderbilt kicked back and Michigan punted again after three unsuccessful pass attempts. The best chance to break the tie came early in the first quarter when Vanderbilt was forced to punt from its own 7-yard line. The Wolverines completed their first pass, Doug Roby to Goebel, setting in motion the change in field position which led to their being poised to score inside the 5-yard line. The Commodore punt was partially blocked, giving Michigan the ball at Vanderbilt's 25-yard line. Two end runs, two line bucks, and a forward pass brought them there, first and goal. Some six minutes had gone by at this point. The Commodores' defense stiffened and repelled four attempts at a touchdown. Three runs straight up the middle were stopped before the goal line. Cappon made a yard, Kipke lost one, and Cappon then drove to within a foot of the goal. Vanderbilt captain Jess Neely was heard shouting 'Stop em!' On fourth down, Michigan faked a field goal and ran with Harry Kipke off tackle to the right. Kipke was stood up just inches from the end zone. One Vanderbilt player even pushed himself off of the goal post, in an attempt to generate a greater backwards push, as the crowd cheered.

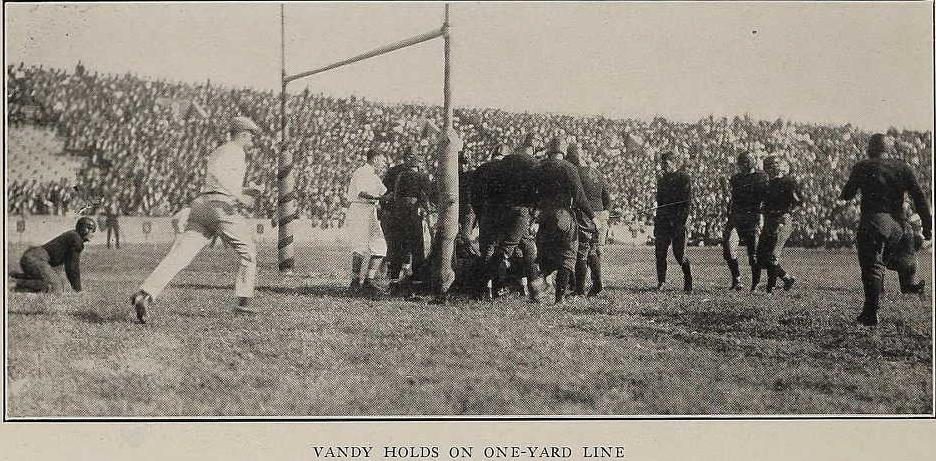
Vandy's goal line stand.

Vanderbilt's only noteworthy offensive play came soon after. Vanderbilt punted out of the shadow of its goal post after the goal line stand, and Jess Neely tackled Kipke, or Irwin Uteritz, hard on the punt return, causing a fumble which Neely recovered. Neely then connected on a pass to Tot McCullough, Vanderbilt's lone offensive highlight on the day. This gave Vanderbilt the ball at Michigan's 20-yard line, but the subsequent plays for Vanderbilt saw runs stopped for little gain and a pass intercepted by Uteritz.

An exchange of punts opened the second quarter. Vanderbilt's defense controlled the quarter after this, forcing two more punts from the Wolverines. On the second of these Gil Reese "side stepped his way through half the Michigan team for eight yards." This seems the only substantial gain for this drive, as Neely kicked it away to Kipke. When the ball was on Michigan's own 40-yard line, its captain Goebel limped off the field. Michigan was forced to punt again by the Vanderbilt defense. The half ended, "with both teams completely baffled in their efforts to score;" as the Commodores had possession of the ball inside their own 30-yard line. Vanderbilt fans cheered wildly, having held the Michigan offense scoreless.

Second half:

Jack Blott kicked off to Kuhn to open the half. Neely quickly punted the ball back and Michigan's offense took the field at its own 25-yard line. Franklin Cappon dashed for a gain on the first play, but nothing followed and the Wolverines punted. Reese was tackled immediately, and the Commodores punted the ball away on first down. Uteritz completed a short pass to Kipke, which along with an offside penalty netted a first down. The Commodores showed more defensive prowess when it held the Wolverines for downs at the 25-yard line. Later, Reese rattled off 24 yards on a punt return, breaking two tackles. Blott missed a field goal on the ensuing Wolverines possession, from about the 25-yard line. Vanderbilt cheering sections were "frantic" as the third quarter ended and still Michigan had not scored.

Herb Steger replaced Roby to start the fourth. Steger fumbled, making the Wolverines punt from their own 25-yard line. Reese again showed skill in his sidestepping, but was injured. Red Rountree replaced him. Goebel eventually came back in and hurled a pass, which if complete may have got 25 yards, but Rountree broke up the pass, forcing a punt. In desperation, Goebel was now often passing; and the Commodores were often deflecting the passes. A 15-yard penalty made it 3rd down and 33 for the Wolverines. On fourth down, Goebel attempted a 45-yard place kick which fell short of the cross bar. The last try for Michigan involved two incomplete passes, an attempted end run by Steger, and an interception by Commodore guard Fatty Lawrence. Vanderbilt had the ball at Michigan's 48-yard line as the game ended. It is said the tie was preserved when Neely recovered a fumble near the Commodore goal.

== Aftermath ==
The tie was the greatest of achievements for the underdog Commodores. The game's result was "a great surprise to the sporting world." It features prominently in the school's history. "The Commodores surprising even to their followers, fought the Michigan eleven, headed by Coach Yost, to a standstill." Commodore fans celebrated by throwing some 3,000 seat cushions onto the field. Many publications called it "one of the big moments of the gridiron season." The Vanderbilt Alumnus wrote "That 0 to 0 finish meant night shirt parades and a sleepless night of jollification. And so it was." Vanderbilt's yearbook The Commodore remarked, "Whence came that irresistible spirit that shattered the Michigan plays no one knows. Every man on the squad possessed it. It was the re-enactment of more than one chapter in the record of Vanderbilt's past. There never was a greater reversal in the history of athletics than that day. The dwarf stood like a Titan foot to foot and breast to breast with the grim Michigan giant, and disarmed him." It was said one Detroit reporter wrote "Michigan was lucky to escape with their lives." Sam S. Greene remarked, "The defensive showing of Vanderbilt against the touted attack of the Western conference moleskin wearers was a revelation even to the ardent followers of the gold and black, who had expected a defeat by at least three touchdowns." Captain Neely had tears of joy streaming down his face by game's end. "They were lucky to tie us", Neely later said of Michigan.

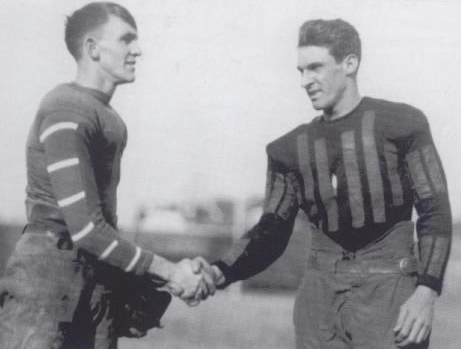
The Two Captains: Paul Goebel and Jess Neely.

Lynn Bomar and Jess Neely are often acknowledged as the players of the game for Vanderbilt. Lynn Bomar spent much of his day tackling Michigan's runners for a loss, and "tore through the Wolverine line constantly, and always emerged after a play on the far side of the defense." while Jess Neely was a battered and bruised captain playing so hard despite his injured frame. (Note: Cappon said after the game: "What sort of a crazy man is this Neely? He played like a fiend and when he tackled me I thought I was broken in two. When I got up he was crying and cussed me out. I was the one who should have been crying.") Other plays of note for the Commodores included the shifty moves of Gil Reese—Reese made 105 yards on punt returns. The yearbook spoke of Reese's play, "Time after time Gil Reece caught punts, and shifting from side to side in a most elusive fashion, would run almost through the Michigan team, by a hair's breadth, escaping each hand outstretched to seize him. He resembled old Lewis Hardage, who taught him that shifty trick." Scotty Neill's punting matching that of Kipke, with an average of 42 yards per punt, was also of note. The defense of Tex Bradford and Tot McCullough received praise. Walter Camp noted the strong showing of Vanderbilt, particularly impressed with Reese's punt returns and McCullough's run defense. He credited McGugin with having developed a well-trained line, and a secondary that was not far behind.

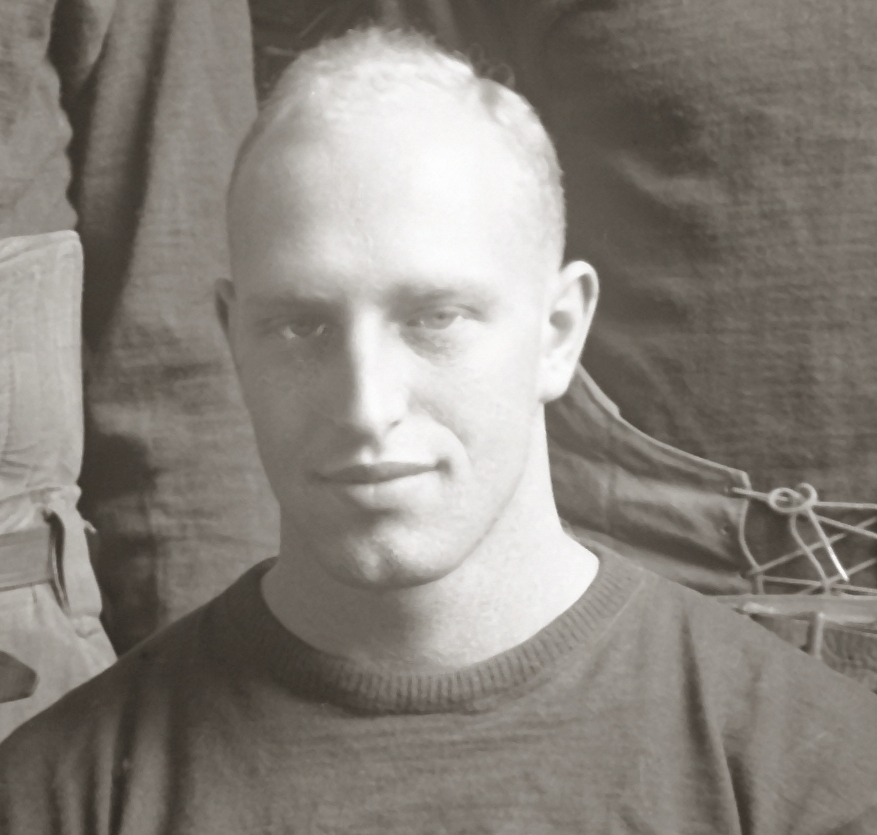
Franklin Cappon.

The New York Times reported that, five days before the Vanderbilt game, Coach Yost had already begun "pointing the Wolverines for their tussle two weeks hence with the Buckeyes." In response to the claim that Michigan could not manage a win because of undue confidence, Coach Yost had said "We have no alibi to offer over the showing made at Vanderbilt. We did not score because we encountered one of the best defenses which I have ever seen in action." Another account reads "Thousands of cheering Vanderbilt fans inspired the surge of center Alf Sharp, guard Gus Morrow, tackle Tex Bradford, and end Lynn Bomar, who stopped Michigan cold in four attempts."

The Michigan Wolverines went on to have one of the best records in the US and receive many postseason accolades. The only blemish on their record was this tie. Michigan and Iowa finished the year tied atop the Western Conference, and Michigan won status as the team with the most All-Americans as cataloged by the Romelke Press Clipping Bureau. Included on this list was Harry Kipke, Paul Goebel, Bernard Kirk, Stanley Muirhead, Irwin Uteritz, Oliver Aas, and Franklin Cappon. Harry Kipke was also named best all-around player in the US by Norman E. Brown. The next week Michigan played at the dedication of another new stadium – Ohio Stadium. Michigan went on to beat Ohio State by a score of 19 to 0.

== Players ==
Michigan's starting lineup against Vanderbilt was Kirk (left end), Muirhead (left tackle), Blott (left guard), Slaughter (center), Steele (right guard), VanDervoort (right tackle), Goebel (right end), Uteritz (quarterback), Kipke (left halfback), Roby (right halfback), and Cappon (fullback). Substitutions for Michigan were by Neisch, Rosatti, Knode, Henderson, and Steger.

Vanderbilt starting lineup against Michigan was McCullough (left end), Bomar (left tackle), Morrow (left guard), Sharpe (center), Kelly (right guard), Bradford (right tackle), Sc. Neill (right end), Kuhn (quarterback), Neely (left halfback), Reese (right halfback), Wakefield (fullback).
