= Dive (American football) =

Type of play in American football

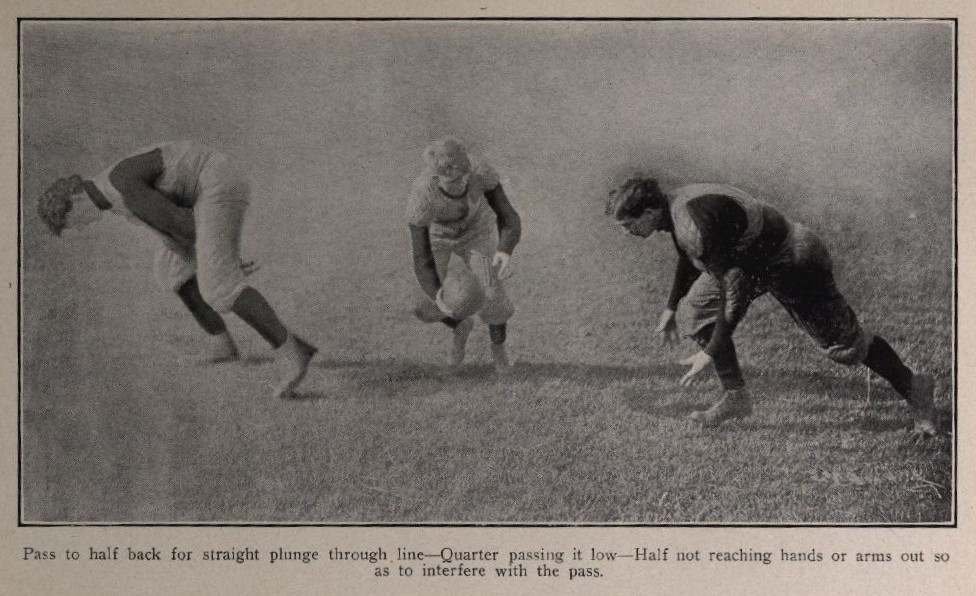
"Pass to half back for straight plunge through the line."

A dive (or plunge or buck, also called a line plunge or line buck) is a type of play in American football in which the ball carrier (usually a fullback or a halfback) attempts to thrust quickly over the line of scrimmage, rushing through the linemen. A dive or buck is distinct from both an end run and an off-tackle run; the gap for the runner can be either between center and guard or between guard and tackle.

== Types ==
The dive may be run with or without a lead blocker, though when run with a lead blocker it may be called a "lead dive". It is often, though not always, used in short-yardage situations, specifically at the goal line.

=== Historical types ===
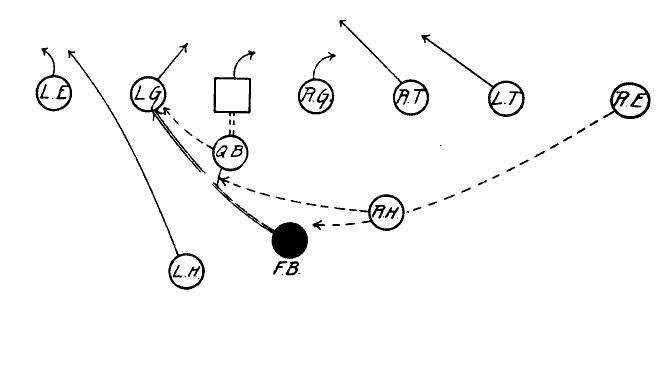
A cross buck

A "cross buck" is a play with two backs crossing paths, one faking to receive the ball, and the other receiving it; thus a dive play with either a faked cross buck or a faked reverse was known as a "split buck".

== Requirements ==
Fullbacks, or larger, stronger running backs less prone to fumbling, are favorable because this play values strength over speed.
