= End run =

Gridiron football play

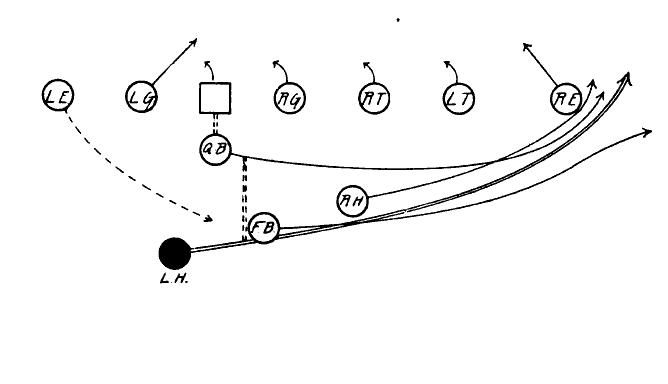
A run around right end

In gridiron football, an end run is a running play in which the player carrying the ball tries to avoid being tackled by running outside the end (or flank) of the offensive line. It is distinct from a dive, which is a run "up the middle", or an off-tackle run, which is a run through the inside gap created by the offensive tackle. Most option offenses are based on the end run.

Colloquially, and in a metaphorical sense it has come to mean an attempt to avoid a difficult situation by dodging it without confronting it directly, or to attempt to circumvent someone's authority by appealing to a different authority. For example, in Star Trek: The Next Generation, William Riker states: "You need to take it to the Captain, fine – through me. You do an end run around me again, I'll snap you back so hard you'll think you're a first-year cadet again."

== Defensive strategy ==
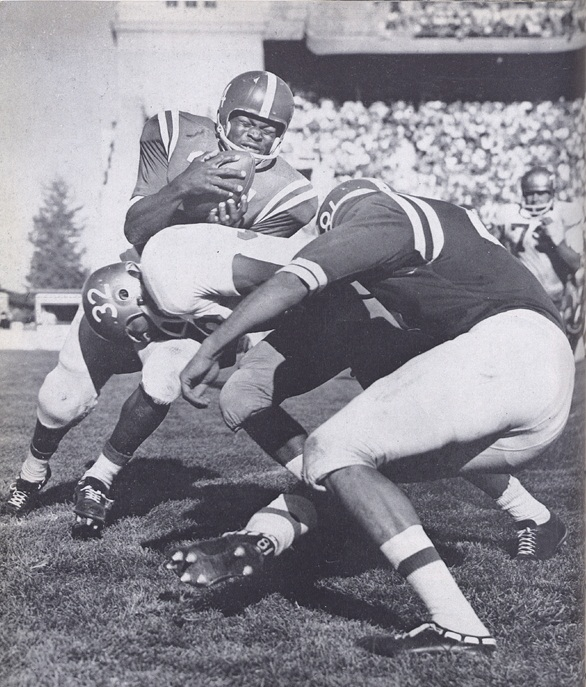
Clay White attempts an end run during a 1959 game.

When faced with an opposing team using the end run, one requires three things to stop it: outside containment (from say a cornerback), defense of the cutback (from say a defensive end), and a safety (to defend the halfback pass).
