= Garland Morrow =

American football and basketball player and coach (1899–1987)

Biographical details
- Born: February 14, 1899; Clarksville, Tennessee, U.S.
- Died: November 4, 1987 (aged 88); Grand Saline, Texas, U.S.

Playing career

Football
- 1919–1920: Vanderbilt
- 1922: Vanderbilt

Basketball
- 1918–1922: Vanderbilt
- Positions: Guard (football), Guard (basketball)

Coaching career (HC unless noted)

Football
- 1927–1932: Vanderbilt (assistant)
- 1932–1935: Cumberland (TN)
- 1936–?: Cincinnati (freshmen)

Basketball
- 1929–1931: Vanderbilt
- 1932–1935: Cumberland (TN)
- 1944–1946: Vanderbilt

Head coaching record
- Overall: 25–13 (football)

Accomplishments and honors

Championships
- Football: 1 Smoky Mountain (1935); Basketball: 1 SIAA (1920)

Awards
- Cumberland Sports Hall of Fame

Garland Augustus Morrow (February 14, 1899 – November 4, 1987) was an American college football and college basketball player and coach. He served two stints at the head basketball coach at Vanderbilt University, from 1929 to 1931 and 1944 to 1946. Morrow was also the head coach in football and basketball at Cumberland College—now known as Cumberland University—in Lebanon, Tennessee from 1932 to 1935.

== Early life and playing career ==
Morrow was born on February 14, 1899, in Clarksville, Tennessee. He played both sports for Vanderbilt University, including football under Dan McGugin. He was also on the track team. Morrow played basketball at Vanderbilt under Wallace Wade.

=== Football ===
Morrow was a starter for the scoreless tie with Michigan at the inauguration at Dudley Field in 1922. "Thousands of cheering Vanderbilt fans inspired the surge of center Alf Sharp, guard Gus Morrow, tackle Tex Bradford, and end Lynn Bomar, who stopped Michigan cold in four attempts." As a player Morrow weighed 175 pounds.

=== Basketball ===
The 1922–23 team went 16–8, beating the LSU Tigers but losing to the Virginia Tech Hokies in the SIAA tournament. An account of the LSU game reads: "Either Vanderbilt was in rare form or L.S.U. has a good fighting team with no shooting ability. Fans were treated to the most one-sided contest of opening day when these two clubs met, the Commodores scoring 13 points before the Louisianans had counted once, winning 36 to 10." Morrow scored 4 points.

== Coaching career ==
=== Vanderbilt ===
Morrow was then an assistant for McGugin from 1927 to 1932. He also served as the head basketball coach at Vanderbilt from 1929 until 1931. He again coached the Vanderbilt basketball team from 1944 to 1946.

=== Cumberland (TN) ===
Morrow was hired at Cumberland University as a coach in 1932, and was elected to the Cumberland Sports Hall of Fame in 1978.

=== Cincinnati ===
Morrow was freshman football coach for the Cincinnati Bearcats under Russ Cohen.

== Later life and death ==
Morrow move from Abilene, Texas to Mineola, Texas in 1980. He died on November 4, 1987, at a hospital in Grand Saline, Texas.

== Head coaching record ==
=== Football ===
| Year | Team | Overall | Conference | Standing | Bowl/playoffs |
|---|---|---|---|---|---|
Cumberland Bulldogs (Independent) (1932)
| 1932 | Cumberland | 4–4 | | | |
Cumberland Bulldogs (Smoky Mountain Conference) (1933–1935)
| 1933 | Cumberland | 7–3 | 0–1 | 7th | |
| 1934 | Cumberland | 7–3 | 1–1 | T–3rd | |
| 1935 | Cumberland | 7–3 | 5–0 | 1st | |
| Cumberland: | | 25–13 | 6–2 | | |
| Total: | | 25–13 | | | |
National championship Conference title Conference division title or championship game berth

=== Basketball ===
Record table
| Season | Team | Overall | Conference | Standing | Postseason |
|---|---|---|---|---|---|
Vanderbilt Commodores (Southern Conference) (1929–1931)
| 1929–30 | Vanderbilt | 6–16 | | | |
| 1930–31 | Vanderbilt | 16–8 | | | |
Vanderbilt Commodores (Southeastern Conference) (1944–1946)
| 1944–45 | Vanderbilt | 6–6 | | | |
| 1945–46 | Vanderbilt | 3–10 | | | |
| Vanderbilt: | | 31–40 | | | |
| Total: | | | | | |
