= Bobby Lavin =

American football and basketball player (1900–1972)

Kentucky Wildcats
- Position: Quarterback

Personal information
- Born: August 31, 1900; Paris, Kentucky, U.S.
- Died: November 1, 1972 (aged 72); Brooklyn, New York, U.S.
- Listed height: 5 ft 7 in (1.70 m)
- Listed weight: 140 lb (64 kg)

Career information
- High school: Paris
- College: Kentucky (1920–1921)

Robert Edward Lavin (August 31, 1900 – November 1, 1972) was a college football and basketball player for the Kentucky Wildcats. On the football team, Lavin was a quarterback for coach Bill Juneau's Wildcats. In the 55–0 loss to Centre in 1921, Lavin was his team's lone star. The 1921 team scored on Vanderbilt for the first time. He was a guard on the basketball team, playing with Basil Hayden. The 1921 basketball team won a Southern Intercollegiate Athletic Association (SIAA) championship.
