= Alfred Sharp =

American football player (1902–1981)

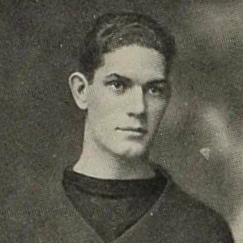
- Sharp circa 1922

No. 3
- Position: Center

Personal information
- Born: February 6, 1902; Nashville, Tennessee, U.S.
- Died: November 1981; Nashville, Tennessee, U.S.
- Listed height: 6 ft 4 in (1.93 m)
- Listed weight: 180 lb (82 kg)

Career information
- High school: Hume Fogg
- College: Vanderbilt (1920–1923)

Awards and highlights
- SIAA championship (1921); SoCon championship (1922, 1923); All-Southern (1921)

Alfred D. Sharp (February 6, 1902 – November 1981) was an American football player for the Vanderbilt Commodores of Vanderbilt University.

== Early life ==
Sharp was born in Nashville on February 6, 1902, to Vernon Hibbett Sharp and Lorene Seleney Dandridge. Sharp attended Hume Fogg High. His younger brother Vernon Sharp was also a Vanderbilt football player, selected All-Southern in 1927.

== Vanderbilt University ==
At Vanderbilt University, Sharp was a member of the Delta Tau Delta fraternity. In an interview by Edwin Thomas Wood of Robert Penn Warren, Warren spoke of Sharp:

Warren: When I was there [at Vanderbilt] we had some fine teams. There was Alf Sharp—he was an All-Southern center at one time. He looked like a badly formed pirate; he was really a menacing looking man. He was two years ahead of me, and then I taught his younger brother [Walter Sharp, who later taught at Vanderbilt. He was instrumental in founding the Department of Fine Arts, of which he was Chairman from 1955 to 1960] when I came back to Vanderbilt in the thirties. And his younger brother came up one day and said, "You're not going to believe this, but I have documentation: my big brother was writing poems secretly the whole time he was here" So I saw the poems years later when the younger brother betrayed him.

Wood: Any good?

Warren: Well, as a matter of fact, they were skillful. They were close imitations of Housman. Very skillfully done, totally unoriginal. But the man had this need, hidden under that murderous exterior, to write poems.

=== Football ===
Sharp was a prominent member of Dan McGugin's Vanderbilt Commodores from 1920 to 1923 as a center on teams which won three straight conference titles.

=== 1921 ===
In a 42 to 0 victory over Mercer in 1921, Sharp recovered a Vanderbilt fumble in the endzone. He was ejected for slugging the following week against Kentucky.

=== 1922 ===
He was a starter for the scoreless tie with the Michigan Wolverines at the dedication of Dudley Field in 1922. Sharp was expected to start the game on the sidelines due to a hurt shoulder. During that game, "Thousands of cheering Vanderbilt fans inspired the surge of center Alf Sharp, guard Gus Morrow, tackle Tex Bradford, and end Lynn Bomar, who stopped Michigan cold in four attempts." Sharp netted an interception the next week in a 20 to 10 victory over the Texas Longhorns.

=== 1923 ===
Sharp recovered a fumble in the endzone in a 17 to 0 victory over Tulane. He was cited along with Lynn Bomar and Bob Rives for holding the Tennessee Volunteers to only 7 in a 51 to 7 romp. Sharp intercepted a pass off the receiver's finger tips during the 35 to 7 victory over Georgia, of which Morgan Blake, sportswriter in the Atlanta Journal, wrote "No southern team has given the Georgia Bulldogs such a licking in a decade."
