= Sam Greene (sportswriter) =

American journalist

- Born: Samuel Saunders Greene; August 26, 1895; Stuart, Virginia
- Died: September 5, 1963 (aged 68); Detroit, Michigan
- Education: Randolph Macon College
- Occupations: Sportswriter and editor
- Employer(s): Detroit Free Press (1922–1924), The Detroit News (1924–1963)
- Spouse: Kittie (Karr) Greene
- Children: Edgar Carlton "Doc" Greene
- Parent(s): George Oliver Greene, Emma (Martin) Greene

Samuel Saunders Greene (August 26, 1895 – September 5, 1963) was an American sportswriter. He covered sports in Detroit, Michigan for more than 40 years, first with the Detroit Free Press (1922–1924) and then with The Detroit News (1924–1963). He was the sports editor for The Detroit News from 1958 to 1963. He was the Detroit correspondent for The Sporting News from 1924 to 1960.

== Early years ==
Greene was born in Stuart, Virginia in 1895. His father, George Oliver Greene, was a Virginia native and a newspaper editor and publisher. His mother Emma (Martin) Greene was also a native Virginian. At the time of the 1900 United States census, Greene was living with his parents and three sisters (Lucy, Bernice and Marian) in Staunton, Virginia. By 1910, the family had moved to Clifton Forge, Virginia, and had grown to include six daughters and three sons. At Clifton Forge, Green's father owned and operated the Daily Review. Greene worked on his father's newspaper as a boy, handling responsibilities that included delivering papers, sweeping floors, setting type, collecting bills, and proofreading.

== Reporter in Virginia and Texas ==
Greene attended Randolph-Macon College in Ashland, Virginia. While attending college, Greene worked as a typesetter for the Hanover Progress in Ashland. When the United States entered World War I in 1917, Greene enlisted in the United States Navy. After the war, Greene became a reporter for The Roanoke Times. He began covering sports while working in Roanoke. At the time of the 1920 United States census, Greene was living in Roanoke. He was married to Kittie (Karr) Greene, a Texas native, and his occupation was listed as a newspaper reporter.

By June 1920, Greene had moved to Beaumont, Texas to become a sportswriter for The Beaumont Enterprise. He spent three years in Beaumont and was appointed as the editor of the sports page. While in Beaumont, his baseball writing, covering the Beaumont Exporters of the Texas League, came to the attention of The Sporting News. He became the Beaumont correspondent for The Sporting News from 1920 to 1922.

== Sports writer in Detroit ==
Greene moved to Detroit, Michigan in August 1922 as a sportswriter for the Detroit Free Press. He spent a year-and-a-half with the Free Press before moving to The Detroit News. He remained with the News for nearly 40 years. He also became the principal Detroit correspondent for The Sporting News from 1924 to 1960. Greene became known for his coverage of the Detroit Tigers, the Michigan Wolverines football team, the Detroit Lions, and boxing. Respected as an expert in each of those sports, Greene was on the committee that chose the American League's Most Valuable Player, and his writing about the Tigers was "looked on by other baseball writers as the last word on the matter." He covered the Lions from their first season in the NFL and through their championship seasons in the 1950s. When the Pro Football Hall of Fame was established in the early 1960s, Greene was one of a member of the board of selectors that chose the initial 17 inductees. He began covering the Michigan Wolverines in 1922, and was posthumously honored in 1971 as a charter inductee into the University of Michigan's Media Hall of Fame.

His fellow sportswriters recalled him as "a gentlemanly patriarch" who "brought dignity and graciousness to the press boxes of major league sports and to his profession." Jack Dulmage of the Windsor Star described him as follows: "He would observe the game with his hat at a rakish tilt, and clench a cigar in his teeth at an impertinent angle. He would move the cigar to laugh heartily at the quips of the day." Joe Falls, who succeeded Greene as the dean of Detroit baseball writers (and who was inducted into the writer's wing of the Baseball Hall of Fame) wrote in his autobiography that Greene was his mentor: "My longtime mentor, Sam Greene, of The Detroit News. When I was 30, Sam was 60, and Sam taught me how to behave myself in my job by simply being nice to people, which Sam did in his every waking hour. He could also outwrite me."

Greene also befriended many of the great sports figures of his time, counting among his friends Ty Cobb, Babe Ruth, Jack Dempsey, and Tex Rickard.

Greene developed a lung infection and underwent lung surgery in 1962. He returned to work shortly after the operation and continued to write until July 1963. His last column concerned the dedication of a plaque at Tiger Stadium honoring Ty Cobb. He died in September 1963. The Associated Press called him "one of America's best known sports chroniclers" and reported that he died "in his bedroom while preparing to listen to the radio report of the Detroit Tigers' game at Boston." The United Press International wrote: "The sports world lost one of its most beloved figures yesterday when Sam Greene died at the age of 68." The Long Beach Press-Telegram called him "Gentleman Sam" and reported: "Anybody who knew Sam Greene was grateful for the privilege. A great legion of sports-writer friends now mourn him."

Greene's son Edgar "Doc" Greene was also a sportswriter for The Detroit News. His son was appointed as the sports editor of The Detroit News in November 1963, two months after Greene's death.

== Selected works by Greene ==
- Texas League Develops Wealth Of Talent for Major Diamonds: Lone Star Belt Boasts Thirty-Odd Players in Big Time (Greene's first by-line for Detroit Free Press), Detroit Free Press, September 3, 1922
- Michigan And Vanderbitt Play To Scoreless Tie In Commodores' Stadium (1922 Michigan Wolverines football team), Detroit Free Press, October 15, 1922
- History Shows Tys Gallant Finishers: Return of Blue Will Give Detroit Full Strength Again (Greene's first story from Detroit for The Sporting News), The Sporting News, September 4, 1924, page 3
- Ty Waits 20 Years For Greatest Feat: Five Home Runs in Two Days Sets Modern Batting Mark (Ty Cobb), The Sporting News, May 14, 1925, page 1
- Some Kind Words for Tiger Fat Boy: Greene Thinks Fothergill Is an Underestimated Player (Bob Fothergill), The Sporting News, November 26, 1925, page 1
- Cobb Is Still Cobb, Detroiters Agree: Sam Greene Says Georgian Looks Better Physically Than in Five Years; Fine Honors Paid Veteran (Ty Cobb), The Sporting News, May 19, 1927, page 1
- Detroit Owes Much of Fame To Star Back: Lloyd Brazil One of Best Ball Carriers in Nation; Has Good Memory (Lloyd Brazil), The Atlanta Constitution, November 28, 1928
- Joe Jackson Still Hopes For Pardon (Shoeless Joe Jackson), The Baltimore Sun (excerpts from Greene's article in The Detroit News, December 28, 1933
- Cochrane Cracks Training Whip To Get Tigers Into Fighting Trim: Puts Men on Rations, Also Orders Curfews (Mickey Cochrane), The Sporting News, March 8, 1934, page 1
- Visiting the Major Parks -- Navin Field: Home of Tigers Was Battleground of N.L. Champs in 1887 (Tiger Stadium), The Sporting News, March 22, 1934, page 6
- Greenberg Slated for Clean-Up Post: Punch of Tiger First Sacker Puts Him Ahead of Goslin (Hank Greenberg/Mickey Cochrane), The Sporting News, April 5, 1934, page 7
- The Schoolboy! He's in a Class by Himself: Rowe Likes Plaudits, Plays to Fans and Puts Over Heroics (Schoolboy Rowe), The Sporting News, August 30, 1934, page 3
- Greenberg's Punch Gains Clean-Up Job (Hank Greenberg/Rosh Hashanah), The Sporting News, September 20, 1934, page 1
- Tigers and Cardinals Paint Series With Color: Mickey Carries Out His Own Prophecies (1934 World Series), The Sporting News, October 4, 1934, page 1
- Little Tom Bridges Tigers' Big Support: Right-Hander Scores Five Wins in May Without Defeat (Tommy Bridges), The Sporting News, June 6, 1935, page 2
- Greenberg Modest About His Homers: Big First Sacker Remains One of Tigers' Best Team Players (Hank Greenberg), The Sporting News, July 4, 1935, page 2
- Tigertown on Toes for World's Series: Plans Completed by City for Big Home-Coming Celebration (1935 World Series), The Sporting News, September 19, 1935, page 3
- Briggs, Auto Magnate, Acquires Navin's Interest in Detroit Club (Walter Briggs, Sr.), The Sporting News, November 21, 1935, page 1
- Vezina Great Goalie in His Time, But Jack Adams Rates Gardiner, Thompson and Roach Right Beside Them (hockey's greatest goalies), The Sunday Sun, February 1, 1936
- Misfortune Dulls Claws of Tigers: Cochrane's Illness Climaxes Ill Luck (Mickey Cochrane), The Sporting News, June 11, 1936, page 1
- Gehringer To Be Feted As Detroit Civic Hero (Charlie Gehringer), The Sporting News, October 7, 1937, page 1
- Detroit Honks Sad Farewell To Goose (Goose Goslin), The Sporting News, October 14, 1937, page 5
- Al Benton Proving Lion for Tigers Working by His Bullpen Work (Al Benton), The Sporting News, August 1, 1940, page 1
- Baker Fires Salute To Bengals' Spirit in Upset Victory: 'I'm Proud of Them' Says Pilot of Biggest 'If' Champs, The Sporting News, October 3, 1940, page 1
- Hurlers Fling Detroit Into Flag Frenzy: Overmire Aiding Aces Diz and Hal (Overmire, Newhouser, Trout), The Sporting News, August 31, 1944, page 1
- Detroit in Series Delerium as Tigers Near Flag: Seat Requests Turned Down by Thousands (1945 World Series), September 27, 1945, page 2
- Greenberg Hit in Celery Loop (Hank Greenberg), The Sporting News, October 18, 1945, page 5
- Tops in Relieving: Marberry's Getting Traynor in 1925 (Firpo Marberry), Baseball Digest, November 1949, page 14
- County Fair Games Started Gehringer to Fame: He By-Passed Farm Chores to Play Ball (Charlie Gehringer), The Sporting News, August 22, 1951, pages 2, 8
- Hockey's Greatest Showman (Maurice Richard), The Montreal Gazette, January 29, 1953
- Ump Stories High on List of Yarn-Spinner Tighe (Jack Tighe), The Sporting News, October 31, 1956, page 2
- "Negro Praised by Other Players" (Ozzie Virgil, Sr.), Detroit's first African-American player), The Detroit News, June 6, 1958
- Narleski Fan Club Chorus Led by Dykes (Ray Narleski), The Sporting News, January 27, 1960, page 16
- No Sleeping There Now (Joe Cronin), Baseball Digest, September 1960, page 69
- Hardwaremen to Tool Up Orioles (Billy Hitchcock), Baseball Digest, February 1962, page 63
