= Alvin Bell =

American football and basketball player, football official

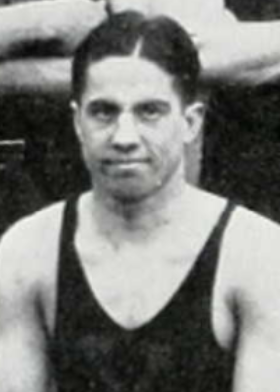
- Bell c. 1922

Vanderbilt Commodores
- Positions: Forward; Quarterback (football)

Personal information
- Born: October 1, 1901 Little Rock, Arkansas, U.S.
- Died: June 1968 (aged 66) Little Rock, Arkansas, U.S.
- Listed weight: 150 lb (68 kg)

Career information
- High school: Little Rock
- College: Vanderbilt University (1920–1923)

Career highlights
- Championships: 3 Southern (football) (1921, 1922, 1923); Honors: All-Southern; Arkansas Sports Hall of Fame

Alvin Euclid "Pep" Bell (October 1, 1901 – June 1968) was an American football and basketball player, who later was a football official for 36 years.

== Early years ==
Alvin Bell was born October 1, 1901, in Little Rock, Arkansas, to William Euclid Bell and Josephine Kirst.

== Playing years ==
Bell won 14 letters at Little Rock High School. He set a then record with 8 touchdowns in a game in 1919. Bell went to Vanderbilt University. His best sport was basketball, where he was selected All-Southern. Bell was a starter the first time Vanderbilt met Tennessee in basketball in 1922. He was said to have "played a hard floor game and started most of Vanderbilt's rallies." Bell also was captain for the 1923–24 team coached by Josh Cody and featuring Lynn Bomar and Gil Reese. That team was beaten in the Southern Conference tournament in the quarterfinals by the eventual champion, Jack Cobb and Cartwright Carmichael led North Carolina, 37–20. On the football team he was the backup quarterback to Doc Kuhn. At Vanderbilt, Bell was a member of the Sigma Alpha Epsilon fraternity.

== Official ==
Bell worked mainly in the Southwest Conference and Southeastern Conference, being referee-in-chief of both. He officiated in four Sugar Bowl games, three Cotton Bowl games, one Orange Bowl, and eight Blue–Gray Games; and the 1936 U.S. Olympic basketball trials. Bell was inducted into the Arkansas Sports Hall of Fame posthumously in 1978.
