= Rupert Smith (American football) =

American football and baseball player (1897–1959)

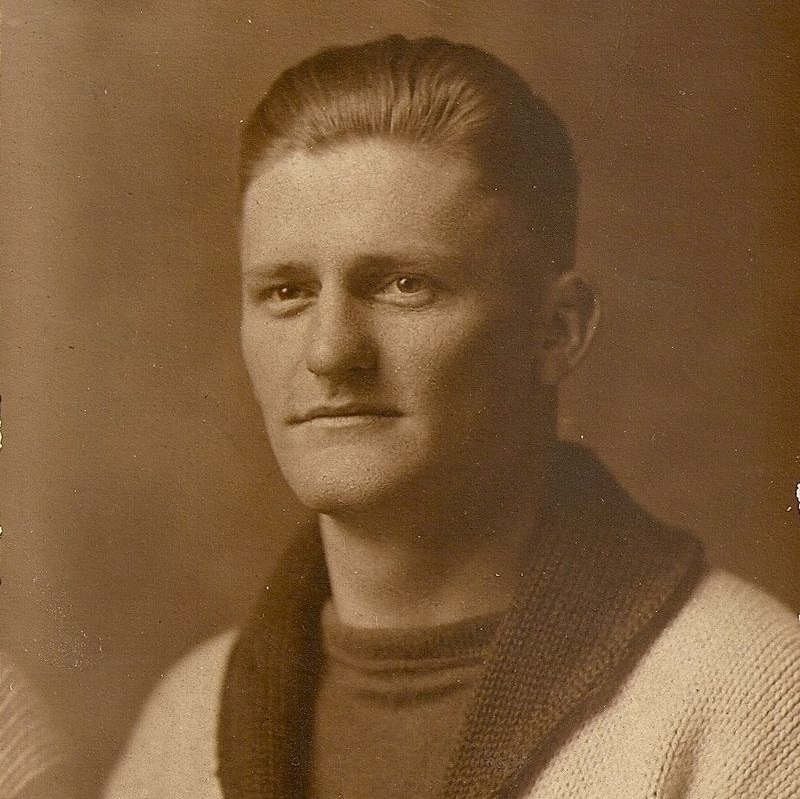
- Rupe circa 1916

No. 3
- Positions: Halfback, Quarterback

Personal information
- Born: January 28, 1897; Murfreesboro, Tennessee, U.S.
- Died: August 28, 1959 (aged 62); Bristol, Tennessee, U.S.
- Listed weight: 158 lb (72 kg)

Career information
- College: Middle Tennessee State (1916–1917); Middle Tennessee State (1919); Vanderbilt (1921)

Awards and highlights
- SIAA championship (1921)

Rupert McAdoo "Rupe" Smith (January 28, 1897 – August 28, 1959) was an American football and baseball player from Tennessee. Smith was the leading scorer on Dan McGugin's 1921 Vanderbilt Commodores football team which shared a Southern Intercollegiate Athletic Association (SIAA) title, and was retroactively selected for a national title by Clyde Berryman. Smith had previously played for the Middle Tennessee State football team.

== Early life ==
Rupert was born on January 28, 1897, in Murfreesboro, Tennessee, to Rufus Taylor Smith and Robert Hodge McAdoo.

== College football ==
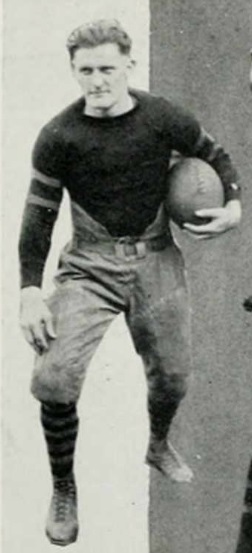
Rupe Smith at Vanderbilt.

=== Middle Tennessee ===
Rupe Smith was Middle Tennessee teammates with future Vanderbilt teammates Jess Neely and P. V. Overall on the 1917 Middle Tennessee State football team. Smith was also captain of the 1919 Middle Tennessee team.

=== Vanderbilt ===
==== 1921 ====
Rupe was a prominent halfback and the leading scorer for Dan McGugin's 1921 Vanderbilt Commodores football team. In the seventh week of play, Vanderbilt faced the defending SIAA champion Georgia Bulldogs at home on Curry Field. The game was to be the highlight of Vandy's schedule this year, deciding the conference champion. It was described by The New York Times as an "important clash." Sporting editor for the Birmingham News "Zipp" Newman had written weeks ago, "Stegeman has a powerful team and with all the regulars in the game, the team has a chance of going through the season undefeated unless it be Vanderbilt that stops her."

The Bulldogs were the favorite to win this meeting of the two schools, first since 1912, in part because the Bulldogs may have outplayed Harvard and defeated Auburn earlier in the season. Georgia had the greatest line in the South, featuring four men deemed All-Southern in guard Puss Whelchel, center Bum Day, tackle Artie Pew, and end Owen Reynolds. Not one team all year scored on Georgia through its line.

Soon after the start of the fourth quarter, Jess Neely intercepted a pass, weaving for a return of 25 yards to Georgia's 40-yard line before being brought down by Jim Reynolds. Two long pass attempts failed, and Thomas Ryan lined up to punt. Rupert Smith snuck in behind Ryan, and rushed to recover the 25-yard onside kick. Smith jumped up to get the ball off the bounce among a hoard of Bulldogs, after they had let it bounce, including the outstretched arms of the Bulldogs' Hartley, and raced for a 15-yard touchdown. He added his own extra point and the game ended as a tie, 7–7, giving both schools a claim to the conference title.
