= Bob Rives =

American football player (1903–1956)

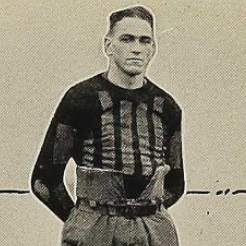

No. 8
- Position: Tackle

Personal information
- Born: November 12, 1903; Hopkinsville, Kentucky, U.S.
- Died: March 1, 1956 (aged 52); Old Hickory, Tennessee, U.S.
- Listed height: 6 ft 1 in (1.85 m)
- Listed weight: 200 lb (91 kg)

Career information
- High school: Hopkinsville
- College: Vanderbilt (1923–1925)

Awards and highlights
- SoCon championship (1923); All-Southern (1923, 1924, 1925); 1934 All-time Vandy team.

Robert Franklin Rives (November 12, 1903 – March 1, 1956) was an American football tackle. He played college football for Vanderbilt University.

== Early life ==
Bob Rives was born on November 12, 1903, in Hopkinsville, Kentucky, to R. H. Rives.

== High school ==
A guard on the Hopkinsville Tigers's undefeated 1920 team, he "won greater college football fame than probably any other graduate of the high school." He refereed high school football games throughout Tennessee for several years prior to his death.

== College football ==
Rives played for Dan McGugin's Vanderbilt Commodores football teams from 1923 to 1925. Bob was a member of the Alpha Tau Omega fraternity. He was a starter for the 1924 game against Minnesota, Vanderbilt's first victory over a Northern school. Rives was deemed an All-Southern tackle in 1924 and 1925.

=== 1923 ===
After two disappointing losses to the Michigan Wolverines and Texas Longhorns, the Commodores started "back up the slope" with a 17 to 0 victory over Tulane. The first score came when Rives, Tom Ryan, Bo Rowland, and Lynn Bomar broke through the line on a punt, with Bomar getting the block. Center Alf Sharpe dove to recover the football in the end zone for the touchdown. Along with Bomar, surely the star of the game, Rives played well, called "No. 1 gallant in the line." Nine writers voted Rives All-Southern.

In the sixth week of play Vanderbilt beat rival Tennessee in a dominating 51 to 7 win. Rives, Bomar, and Sharpe on defense helped hold the Volunteers to only 7. With the win Vanderbilt was still a contender for the Southern title. The next week Vanderbilt again won big, over the Georgia Bulldogs 35 to 7. Again on defense Bomar and Rives shared the credit. Halfback Gil Reese scored 9 touchdowns over these two games. In the final week of play on Thanksgiving Day, the Florida Gators upset the Alabama Crimson Tide in the rain by a score of 16 to 6, helping ensure Vanderbilt's Southern championship. This is the last conference title for Vanderbilt in football. Then Florida players Cy Williams, Goldy Goldstein, and Ark Newton would be teammates of Rives's on the Newark Bears of the first American Football League in 1926.

=== 1924 ===
Rives started every game at tackle during the 1924 season, dubbed by Fred Russell "the most eventful season in the history of Vanderbilt football." Vanderbilt avenged last year's scoreless tie against Mississippi A & M with an 18 to 0 victory. Rives was the star of the Commodores' line that game. He was a starter for the 16–0 win over the Minnesota Golden Gophers at Memorial Stadium, Vanderbilt's first victory in it history over a Northern school. The first touchdown came at the end of a 63-yard drive when Rives opened a hole for Tom Ryan. At year's end, Rives was selected All-Southern.

=== 1925 ===
Rives was the only Vanderbilt player to make All-Southern in 1925.

== Professional football ==
He played professionally for the Newark Bears of the American Football League in 1926. Doug Wycoff, fullback from Georgia Tech, was a teammate. The team played only five games before folding in October 1926.

== Death ==
Rives died at his residence in Old Hickory, Tennessee, on March 1, 1956.
