= Tex Bradford =

American football player and medical doctor (1899–1975)

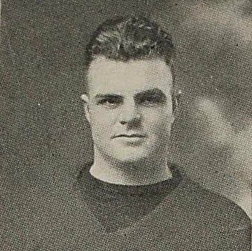

No. 21
- Position: Tackle

Personal information
- Born: August 15, 1899; Mansfield, Texas, U.S.
- Died: January 27, 1975 (aged 75); Dallas, Texas, U.S.
- Listed height: 6 ft 0 in (1.83 m)
- Listed weight: 200 lb (91 kg)

Career information
- College: TCU (1919); Vanderbilt (1921–1922)

Awards and highlights
- SIAA championship (1921); SoCon championship (1922); All-Southern (1922)

Cecil Rhodes "Tex" Bradford (August 15, 1899 – January 27, 1975) was a college football player and a medical doctor.

== Early life ==
Bradford was born on August 15, 1899, in Mansfield, Texas, to James Frederick Bradford and Susan Virginia Hobson.

== College football ==
Tex was a prominent tackle for the TCU Horned Frogs of Texas Christian University; and Dan McGugin's Vanderbilt Commodores of Vanderbilt University from 1921 to 1922, winning Southern championships both his years there. He graduated from Vanderbilt with an M. D. in 1924.

=== TCU ===
Bradford first played for Texas Christian University, making All-Texas teams.

=== Vanderbilt ===
==== 1921 ====
In his first game with the Commodores, Tex was forced to wear civilian shoes until Vanderbilt received its order for cleats big enough to fit his feet. Vanderbilt later played a game against Texas at the Texas State Fair. Vandy would upset the powerful Longhorns eleven 20 to 0. The first score came on a third down at some point near the middle of the second quarter. Texas' Ivan Robertson, with the Commodores' Tom Ryan and Bradford running after him, threw a pass not near a single Longhorn; which was intercepted by Vanderbilt's captain Pink Wade. Wade returned the interception for 65 yards and the touchdown.

==== 1922 ====
Tex was a starter for the scoreless tie with the Michigan Wolverines at the dedication of Dudley Field in 1922. His defense that day received praise. "Thousands of cheering Vanderbilt fans inspired the surge of center Alf Sharp, guard Gus Morrow, tackle Tex Bradford, and end Lynn Bomar, who stopped Michigan cold in four attempts." He was elected to four All-Southern teams in 1922.

To the woe of Commodore fans, on October 10, 1923, Bradford was ruled ineligible on grounds of having already played four years of college athletics. His loss was lamented so near the eve of the Michigan game, for his line work against them was "materially responsible" for the 0 to 0 tie the year before.
