= Zipp Newman =

American journalist (1894–1977)

- Born: Henry Hardin Newman; May 24, 1894; Smith Mills, Kentucky, U.S.
- Died: March 3, 1977 (aged 82); Birmingham, Alabama, U.S.
- Occupation: Sportswriter

Henry Hardin "Zipp" Newman (May 24, 1894 – March 3, 1977) was an American sportswriter known as the "Dean of Southern Sports Writers."

== Early life and education ==
Newman was born on May 24, 1894, in Smith Mills, Kentucky to Henry Haynes Newman and Henriette Beauregard Haynes. He came to Birmingham, Alabama, at a young age. He attended Powell Elementary School, Central High School, and Birmingham–Southern College. In high school he reported ran to 100-yard dash in ten seconds flat, and so he carried the nickname "Zipp."

== Career ==
In 1919, Newman became the South's youngest sports editor at the Birmingham News and was to become the Dean of Southern sports writers. For 44 years, he was the official scorer for baseball's "AA" Southern League. Newman was a correspondent for The Sporting News for many years, and became first associated with the Birmingham News in 1912. He started restricting his duties in 1959 when he became sports editor emeritus, but continued to write his column. Newman was elected to the Alabama Sports Hall of Fame in 1975, and started the institution as its first executive secretary.

Newman once said, "Football is a religion in the Southland, played by the boys and relived daily by their families." When Travis Tidwell led Auburn defeated Alabama in 1949, Newman wrote "There has never been a sweeter Auburn victory in all the 58 years of football on the Plains than the Tigers 14-13 win over Alabama."

== Bibliography ==
- The House of Barons: Record of the Barons since 1900, (1948)
- 50 Years of Professional Baseball in Alabama, 1950
- The Impact of Southern Football, 1969
