= Off-tackle run =

American football play

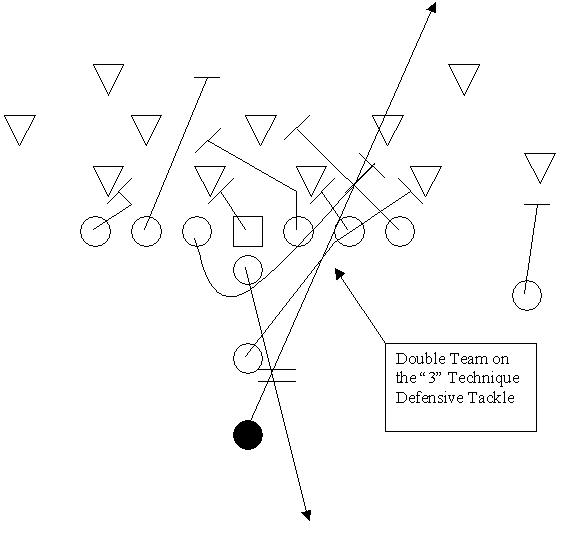
Diagram of an off-tackle play.

An off-tackle run in American football is a play in which the running back carries the ball through a running lane off of the tackle's block. The lead block kicks out the end man on the line of scrimmage, and another offensive player usually blocks the linebacker. It can be useful in short yardage situations, and with large backs.

The most simple form of this play has the strong side offensive lineman step towards the ball and block any defender inside of him. The fullback will kick out the end man to create the running lane for the ball carrier. The Maryland I used the 2nd back to lead through the hole and block the linebacker. More complicated versions of the play have pulling guards block the linebacker or combination blocks by a tight-end and tackle to create the hole and block the linebacker.

== History ==
The off-tackle play is a key feature of the single wing offense.
