= List of Vanderbilt University athletes =

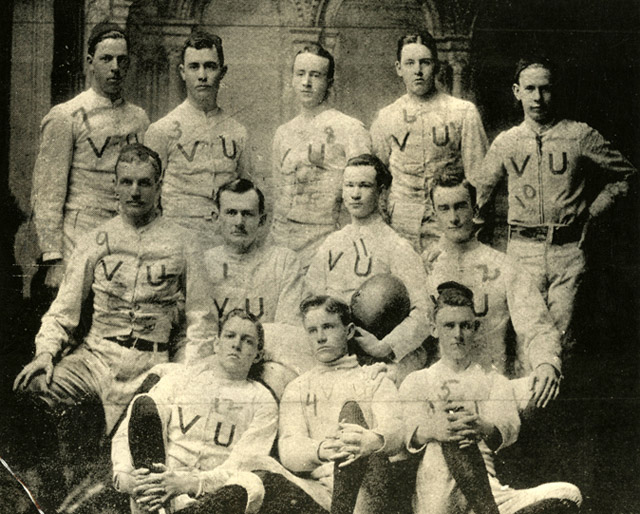
Vanderbilt's first football team

Vanderbilt University in Nashville, Tennessee, has graduated a number of athletes. This includes graduates, non-graduate former students and current students of Vanderbilt who are notable for their achievements within athletics, sometimes before or after their time at Vanderbilt. Intercollegiate sports teams at Vanderbilt are known as the "Commodores", due to founder Cornelius Vanderbilt's sobriquet.

Vanderbilt University currently sponsors teams in six men's and ten women's NCAA sanctioned sports: men's baseball, men's and women's basketball, women's bowling, men's and women's cross country, men's and women's golf, women's lacrosse, women's soccer, women's swimming, men's and women's tennis, and women's track and field.

Well-known American football athletes include former students Jay Cutler, Jamie Duncan, Shelton Quarles, and Will Wolford; former Vanderbilt football coaches Dan McGugin, Wallace Wade, and Red Sanders; and all-time greats such as Lynn Bomar, Josh Cody, Bucky Curtis, Carl Hinkle, Bill Spears, John J. Tigert, and Bill Wade. Former Vanderbilt chemistry professor William Lofland Dudley was known as the "father of Southern football." Vanderbilt's entrants into the NBA include Charles Davis, Festus Ezeli, Shan Foster, John Jenkins, Dan Langhi, Clyde Lee, and Will Perdue. Award-winning baseball stars include Pedro Alvarez, David Price, Scotti Madison, and Mike Minor. Sportswriters Grantland Rice and Fred Russell were both members of the baseball team.

== Olympics ==
Name	Class year	Position	Notability	Reference(s)
Scott A. Muller	1994	K1 Whitewater slalom	Finished 44th in the K-1 event at the 1996 Summer Olympics; won bronze medal at the 2002 Pan American Slalom Kayak Championships	
Jeff Turner	1984	Power forward	Former professional basketball player with the New Jersey Nets and former U.S. Olympic team member (gold medal in men's basketball, 1984)	

== American football ==
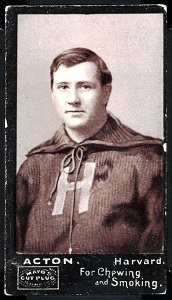
R. G. Acton, head coach for Vandy's first conference title

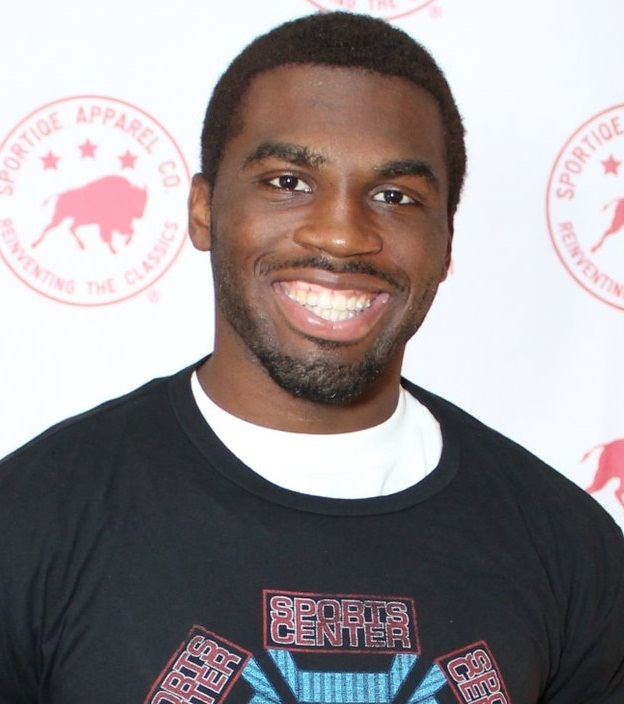
Earl Bennett, All-SEC (2005, 2006, 2007)

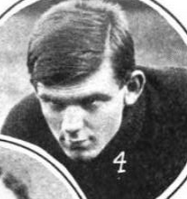
Bob Blake, All-Southern (1903, 1905, 1906, 1907)

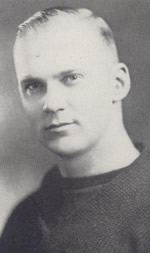
Lynn Bomar, end for the Vanderbilt Commodores and New York Giants

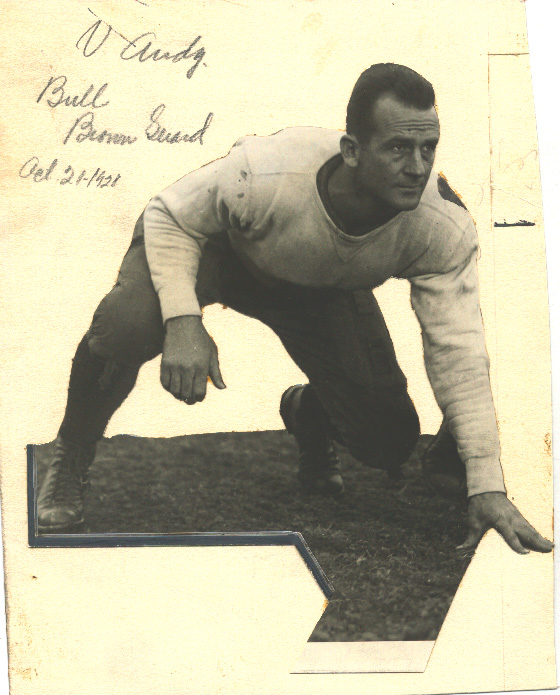
Bull Brown, All-Southern (1928, 1929)

Josh Cody, third-team All-American and thrice All-Southern, college coach

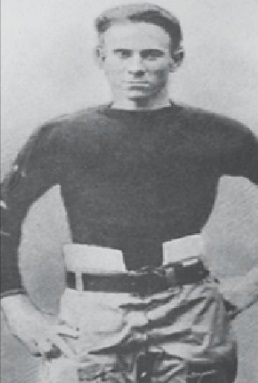
Irby "Rabbit" Curry, third-team All-American

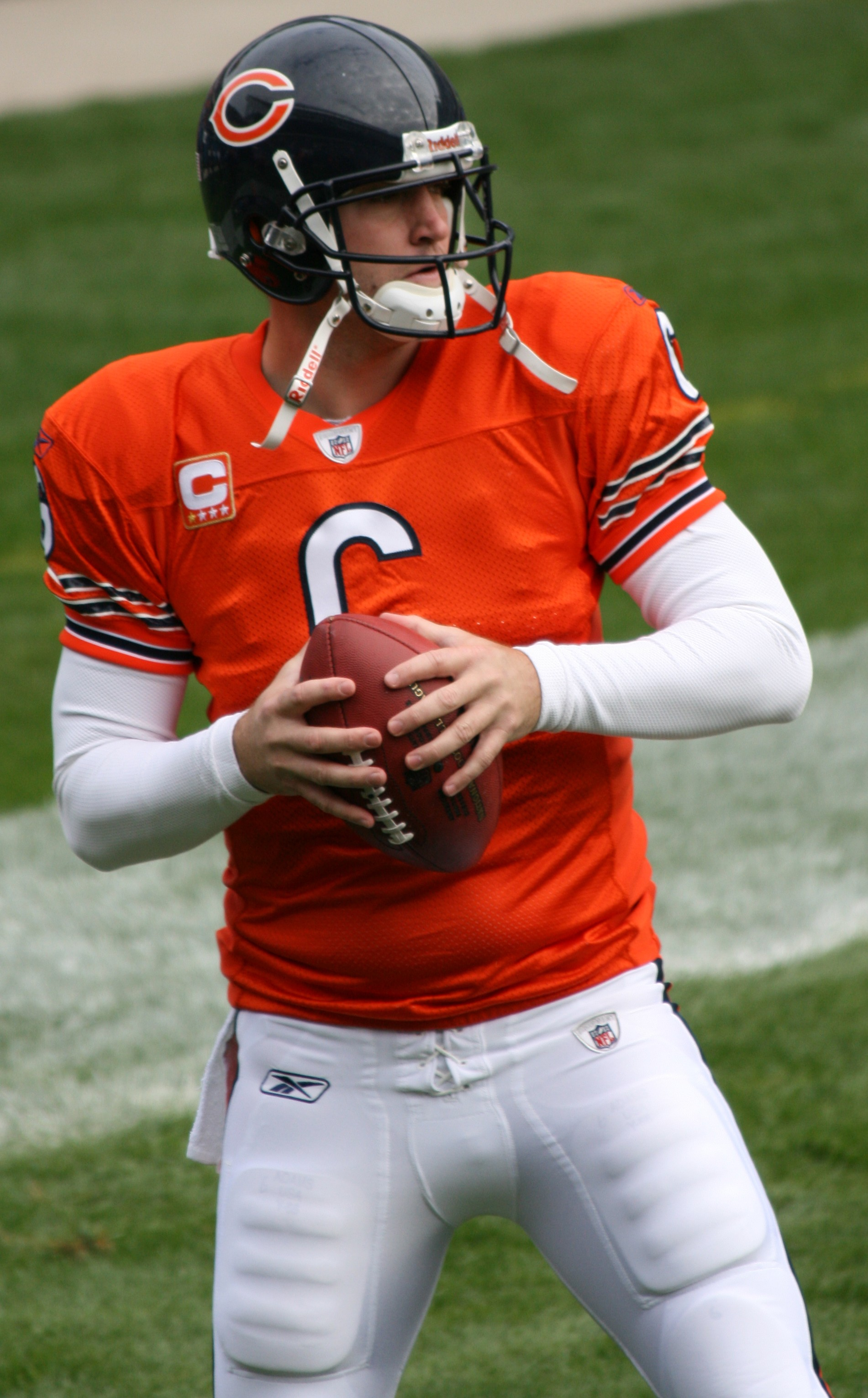
Jay Cutler, first-round draft pick (11th overall) of the Denver Broncos (2006–2009)

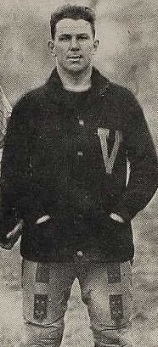
Lewie Hardage, All-Southern (1908 (with Auburn), 1911, 1912)

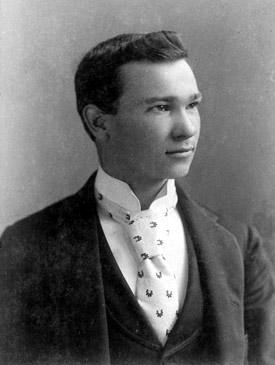
Elliott Jones, Vanderbilt's first captain and coach

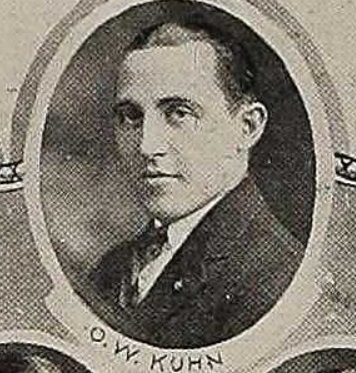
Doc Kuhn, All-American honorable mention

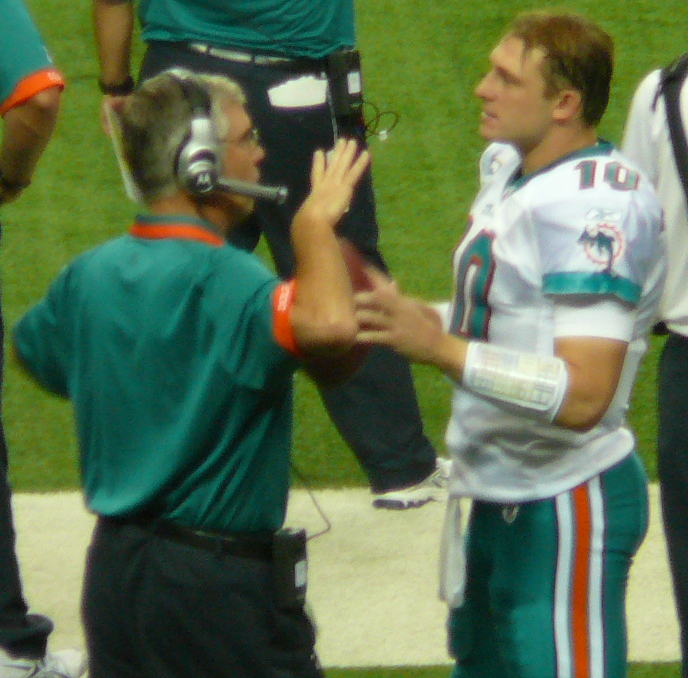
David Lee, next to Chad Pennington in 2009

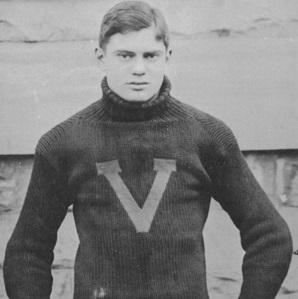
W. E. Metzger, Dan McGugin's first great guard

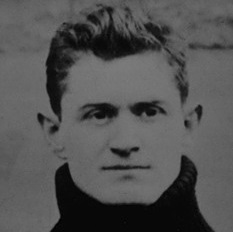
Ray Morrison, All-Southern (1910, 1911)

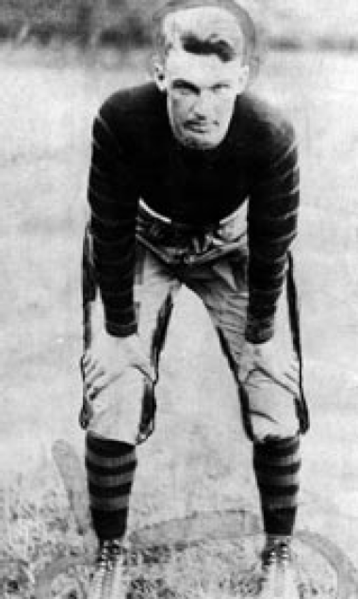
Jess Neely, one of Vandy's greatest ever captains (1922)

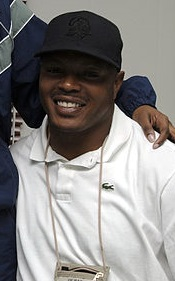
Shelton Quarles, Pro Bowl Selection (2002)

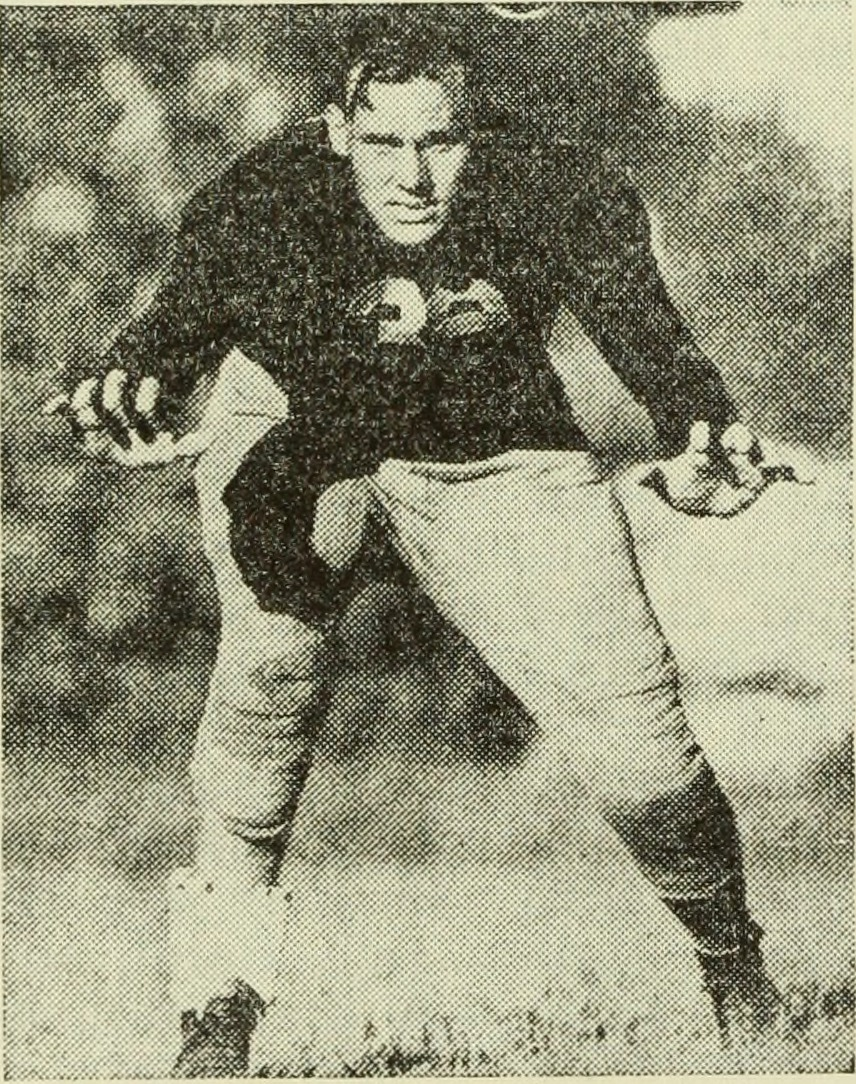
Baby Ray, Green Bay Packers (1938–1948), NFL 1940s All-Decade Team, Green Bay Packers Hall of Fame

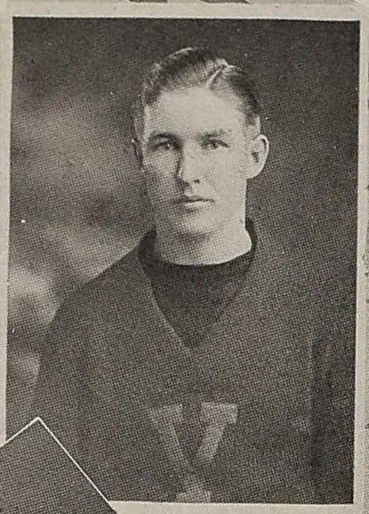
Gil Reese, first three-sport captain at Vanderbilt (1923, 1924)

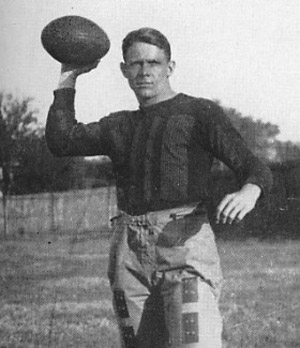
Bill Spears, All-Southern (1926, 1927), College Football Hall of Fame

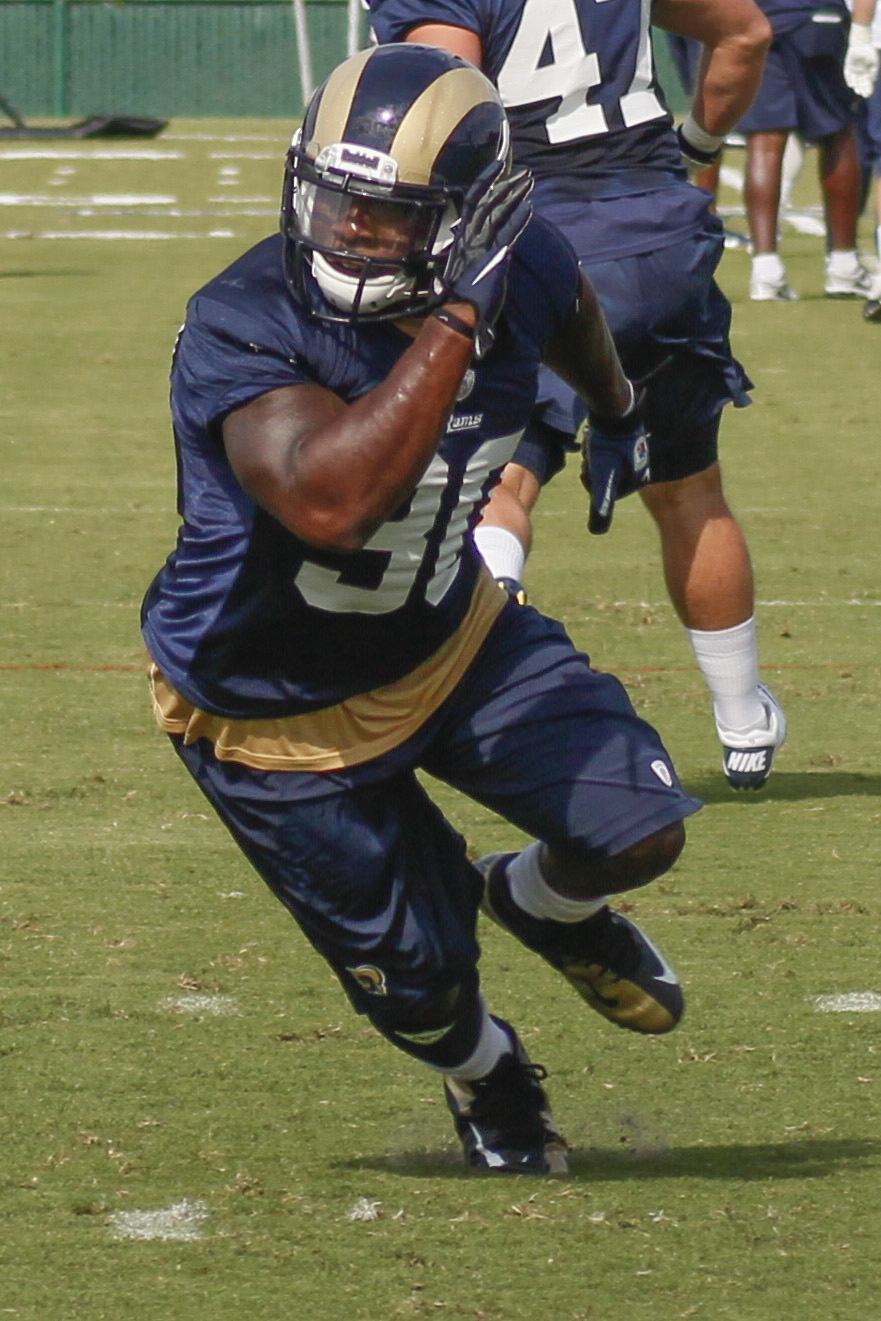
Zac Stacy, plays for the New York Jets

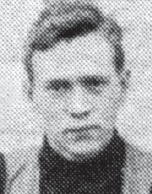
Stein Stone, All-Southern (1904, 1905, 1906, 1907)

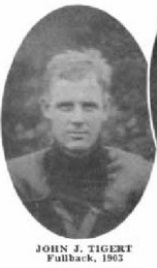
John J. Tigert, All-Southern (1903), College Football Hall of Fame

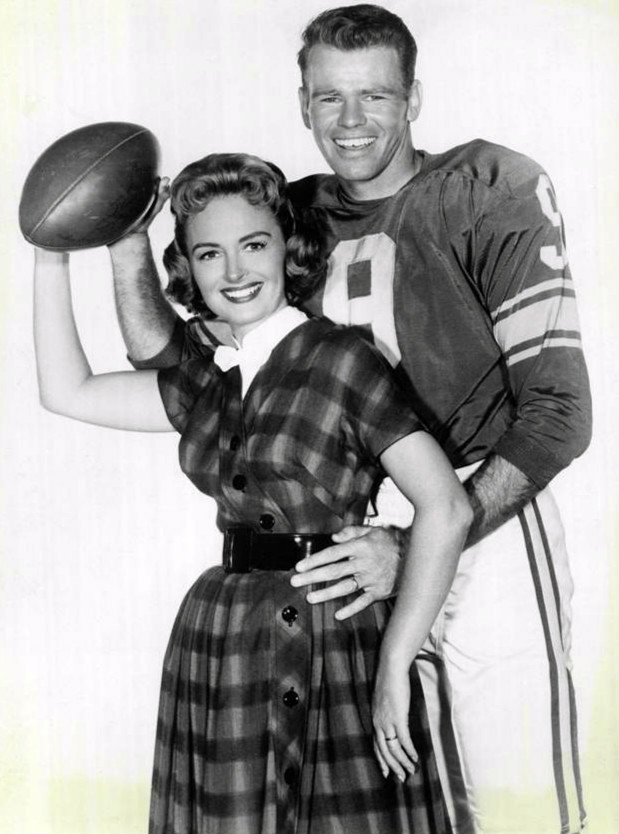
Bill Wade with Donna Reed, 1959; quarterback, SEC MVP (1951)

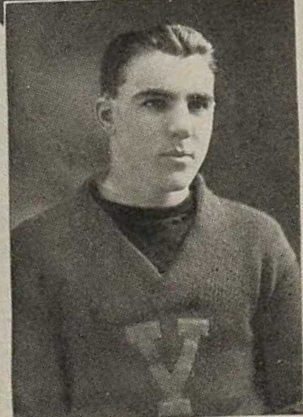
Hek Wakefield, consensus All-American (1924) All-Southern (1923, 1924)

Name	Class year	Position	Notability	Reference(s)
Dick Abernathy	1929	End	All-Southern (1928, 1929), All-American (1928)	
R. G. Acton	1898	Guard	Vanderbilt's fifth head coach (1896–1898), led Vandy to its first conference title; also played at Harvard; medical doctor; died of an overdose of morphine in 1900	
Alf Adams	1919	End	Captain (1917), All-Southern (1917, 1919), last non-senior captain until 2003	
Billy Alford	2004	Cornerback	National Football League and Arena Football League player	
Ricky Anderson	1984	Punter	Consensus All-American (1984), first-team All-SEC (1984), also placekicker	
Jimmy Armistead	1928	Halfback	Captain (1928), led nation in scoring in 1927 (138 points), target of Bill Spears	
Jim Arnold	1982	Punter	National Football League player, Pro Bowl selection, Vandy Athletics Hall of Fame, SEC Football Legend (2002)	
Bob Asher	1969	Tackle	National Football League player, Super Bowl champion (VI), SEC Football Legend (1995); All-American (1969), second-team All-SEC (1968)	
Derrick Atterberry	1994	Defensive back	Canadian Football League and Arena Football League player	
Brandon Barden	2011	Tight end	National Football League player	
Ainsley Battles	1999	Safety	National Football League player	
William E. Beard	1892	Quarterback	Said to be the first to dub Vanderbilt the Commodores in the Nashville Banner, first Vandy quarterback to play Tennessee	
Alvin "Pep" Bell	1924	Quarterback	Backup to Doc Kuhn; official for 30 years; officiated in four Sugar Bowl games and eight Blue–Gray Games, and the 1936 U.S. Olympic basketball trials; Arkansas Sports Hall of Fame	
Horace E. Bemis	1890	Halfback	Said by Elliott Jones to be responsible for the majority of the offense in Vanderbilt's first ever football game	
Earl Bennett	2007	Wide receiver	National Football League player, thrice All-SEC (2005, 2006, 2007)	
Grailey Berryhill	1921	Running back	Scored six touchdowns in the 76–0 victory over rival Tennessee in 1918, captain-elect (1921), Tennessee politician	
Bob Blake	1907	End	All-Southern (1903, 1905, 1906, 1907), 1912 All-time Vandy 1st team; Associated Press Southeast Area All-Time football team 1869–1919 era, won 4 Southern championships in his 4 years, Rhodes Scholar	
Dan Blake	1906	Running back	All-Southern (1905, 1906), brother of Bob	
Frank Blake	190?	Coached Mercer	Brother of Bob, Dan, and Vaughn	
Vaughn Blake	1909	End	All-Southern (1908), brother of Bob and Dan	
Hord Boensch	1913	Quarterback	All-Southern (1913)	
Lynn Bomar	1924	End	Consensus All-American in 1923, the last first team All-American from the south selected by Walter Camp (1922, 1923), National Football League player, Associated Press Southeast Area All-Time football team 1920–1969 era, 1934 All-time Vandy team, first from Vanderbilt to be elected to the College Football Hall of Fame as a player, Tennessee Sports Hall of Fame, member of teams which won three straight conference titles; later became warden of Tennessee State Prison and executed several men	
Howard Boogher	1897	End	1912 All-time Vandy 1st team	
C. R. "Tex" Bradford	1923	Tackle	Starter for scoreless tie with Michigan at dedication of Dudley Field, All-Southern (1922), ruled ineligible for '23	
Bull Brown	1929	Guard	Captain (1929), All-Southern (1928, 1929), All-American (1929), 1934 All-time Vandy team, one of six players McGugin ranked as his best.	
Enoch Brown	1913	End	All-Southern (1911, 1912, 1913), 1912 All-time Vandy 2nd team	
Innis Brown	1905	Guard	All-Southern (1904, 1905), Southern official	
Mack Brown	1972	Running back	Former head football coach at University of Texas, won the 2005 National Championship, transferred to Florida State University	
Preston Brown	1979	Wide receiver	National Football League player	
Tom Brown	1913	Tackle	1912 All-time Vandy 1st team	
Watson Brown	1972	Quarterback	Led the winning touchdown drive in 1969 against 13th ranked Alabama in Nashville; Tennessee Sports Hall of Fame; later coach; older brother of Mack Brown	
Marcus Buggs	2007	Linebacker	National Football League player	
Lucius E. Burch	1896	Guard	1912 All-time Vandy 1st team, later a prominent surgeon and dean of Vanderbilt University Medical School	
Vin Campbell	1907	Halfback	1912 All-time Vandy 2nd team	
Charlie Carman	1919	Guard	National Football League player	
Corey Chavous	1997	Safety	National Football League player, Pro Bowl (2003), SEC Football Legend (2010)	
Walter K. Chorn	1908	Guard	1912 All-time Vandy 2nd team	
Josh Cody	1919	Tackle	Third-team All-American (1915, 1919), All-Southern (1915, 1916, 1919); later football and basketball coach at Vandy; Associated Press Southeast Area All-Time football team 1869–1919 era; Football Writers Association of America 1869–1918 Early Era All-America Team; one of six players McGugin ranked as his best; College Football Hall of Fame (1970); Tennessee Sports Hall of Fame	
Russ Cohen	1916	End	Captain of SIAA champion 1915 team; All-Southern (1915); longtime college coach	
Leonard Coleman	1983	Cornerback	First round pick in 1984, Indianapolis Colts (1984–1987) San Diego Chargers (1988–1989)	
Wilson Collins	1911	Halfback		
Phil Connell	1897	Fullback	1912 All-time Vandy 1st team	
Ken Cooper	1948	Guard		
Sam Costen	1908	Quarterback	All-Southern (1906), one-time coach at The Citadel	
Martin Cox	1978	Running back		
Honus Craig	1907	Running back	1912 All-time Vandy 1st team, 1934 All-time Vandy team	
Larry "Kitty" Creson	1928	End	All-Southern (1927)	
Zach Curlin	1913	Quarterback	Longtime Memphis Tigers coach; made kicks against both Harvard and Michigan	
Irby "Rabbit" Curry	1916	Quarterback	Known as "Rabbit", described as "the player who has most appealed to the imagination, admiration, and affection of the entire university community through the years"; All-Southern (1915, 1916) and third-team All-American; SIAA Champion (1915); a beloved player killed over France in the First World War; Tennessee Sports Hall of Fame; namesake of Curry Field	
Bucky Curtis	1950	End	National Football League player, All-American (1950), led nation with 29.3 yard reception average in 1950, target of Bill Wade, Vandy Athletics Hall of Fame	
Jay Cutler	2005	Quarterback	Currently plays for the Chicago Bears; Pro Bowl Selection (2008); SEC Offensive Player of the Year (2005); first-team All-SEC (2005)	
Herman Daves	1918	Guard	All-Southern	
George Deiderich	1958	Guard	Consensus All-American (1958), first-team All-SEC (1957, 1958), National and Canadian football league player	
Art Demmas	1956	Tackle	Captain (1956), college and NFL official, Tennessee Sports Hall of Fame	
Rand Dixon	1935	Quarterback	Decorated World War II veteran	
Jamie Duncan	1997	Linebacker	All-American (1997), National Football League player, Vandy Athletics Hall of Fame, SEC Football Legend (2009)	
Jack Dye	1899	Running back	All-Southern (1898)	
John Edgerton	1902	Fullback	1912 All-time Vandy 2nd team, All-Southern (1902)	
Pat Estes	1890	Quarterback	Vanderbilt's first quarterback	
Johnny "Red" Floyd	1920	Running back	Coached at Middle Tennessee State, namesake of Johnny "Red" Floyd Stadium	
Ewing Y. Freeland	1911	Tackle	All-Southern (1911); TCU Horned Frogs, Millsaps Majors, SMU Mustangs, and Texas Tech Red Raiders head football coach; TCU Horned Frogs men's basketball head coach, Texas Tech Red Raiders baseball head coach, and Texas Tech Red Raiders athletic director	
Curtis Gatewood	2007	Linebacker	National Football League player	
Willie Geny	1935	End	Vandy's first first-team All-SEC player, SEC MVP (1935), Tennessee Sports Hall of Fame	
Justin Geisinger	2004	Guard	National Football League player	
Frank Godchaux, Sr.	1899	Quarterback		
Frank Godchaux	1921	Running back	First son to follow in his father's footsteps as a Vanderbilt football player, member of SIAA champion 1921 team	
Jonathan Goff	2007	Linebacker	2nd team All-SEC, National Football League player, Super Bowl Champion (XLVI)	
Bob Goodridge	1967	Wide receiver	SEC Player of the Year (1967), National Football League player	
Clarence "Pete" Gracey	1932	Center	Thrice All-Southern (1930, 1931, 1932), consensus All-American (1932)	
Irish Graham	1905	Tackle	All-Southern (1904)	
Bob Gude	1941	Center	2x All-SEC (1940, 1941), All-American (1941), NFL player	
Andre Hal	2013	Cornerback	Currently plays for the Houston Texans	
Ed Hamilton	1908	End	All-Southern (1904, 1905)	
Lewie Hardage	1912	Running back	All-Southern (1908 (with Auburn), 1911, 1912), 1912 All-time Vandy 2nd team, backfield coach at Vanderbilt (1922–1931), head coach of the Oklahoma Sooners football team (1932–1934), one of six players McGugin ranked as his best	
Gene Harlow	1940	Fullback, guard	Former coach at Arkansas State	
Corey Harris	1991	Defensive back	National Football League player	
Dennis Harrison	1977	Defensive end	Tennessee Sports Hall of Fame	
Louis Hasslock	1908	Guard	All-Southern (1908)	
Jovan Haye	2004	Defensive lineman	National Football League player	
Casey Hayward	2011	Cornerback	Currently plays for the Green Bay Packers	
Gink Hendrick	1920	End	All-Southern (1920), leading scorer of 1920 Vandy team	
Hunter Hillenmeyer	2002	Linebacker	National Football League player	
Carl Hinkle	1937	Center	Southeastern Conference MVP (1937), College Football Hall of Fame (1959), Vandy Athletics Hall of Fame, Tennessee Sports Hall of Fame	
Charley Horton	1955	Halfback	Third-team All-American (1955), National and Canadian football league player	
Terence Jeffers-Harris	1942	Wide receiver	Canadian Football League player	
Jack Jenkins	1942	Running back	All-SEC, drafted 1st round, 10th overall in the 1943 NFL draft	
Wesley Johnson	2013	Guard	Currently plays for the Pittsburgh Steelers	
Elliott Jones	1892	Running back	Vanderbilt's first captain and head coach	
Rushen Jones	2002	Defensive back	National Football League player	
Antony Jordan	1997	Linebacker	National Football League player	
W. J. "Cap" Keller	1894	Quarterback	Vanderbilt's second captain and head coach	
Everett "Tuck" Kelly	1924	Guard	All-Southern (1923), captain (1924), member of teams which won three straight conference titles, starter for scoreless tie with Michigan at dedication of Dudley Field	
Jack Kershaw	1935	?	Attorney and sculptor who represented James Earl Ray	
Phil King	1957	Running back	Captain (1957), National Football League player	
Doc Kuhn	1923	Quarterback	Starting quarterback for teams which won three straight conference titles, starter for scoreless tie with Michigan at dedication of Dudley Field, Walter Camp All-American honorable mention in 1922, Porter Cup recipient in 1923, captain of both football and basketball teams in '23	
Frank Kyle	1905	Quarterback	First starting quarterback under coach Dan McGugin, 1912 All-time Vandy 2nd team	
Kenny Ladler	2013	Safety	Currently plays for the Buffalo Bills	
Reshard Langford	2008	Safety	National Football League player	
Swayne Latham	1921	Quarterback	All-Southern (1919)	
Fatty Lawrence	1924	Guard	Starter for scoreless tie with Michigan at dedication of Dudley Field, starter for 1924 defeat of Minnesota, Vandy's first victory over a Northern school	
David Lee	1974	Quarterback	Starting quarterback and team's most valuable player (1974), now coach	
Myron Lewis	2009	Cornerback	National Football League player	
Tex Leyendecker	1932	Tackle	All-Southern (1931, 1931), National Football League player	
Tom Lipscomb	1919	Tackle		
Owsley Manier	1906	Fullback	1912 All-time Vandy 1st team, 1934 All-time Vandy team, member of 3 straight southern championships, first Vanderbilt player elected to an All-American team; on Walter Camp's third-team	
Chris Marve	2011	Linebacker	Second-team All-SEC (2011)	
Allama Matthews	1982	Wide receiver	National Football League player	
Jordan Matthews	2013	Wide receiver	Currently plays for the Philadelphia Eagles, third-team All-American (2013), twice All-SEC (2012, 2013), single-season record with 1,262 yards receiving (2012), single-season SEC reception record at 112 (2013), SEC record with 263 career receptions and 3,759 career yards	
C. R. "Tot" McCullough	1923	End	Known for his large size (6'4"), starter for scoreless tie with Michigan at dedication of Dudley Field, was ruled ineligible for '23	
Ox McKibbon	1927	End	Starter for 1924 defeat of Minnesota, Vandy's first victory over a Northern school	
Fatty McLain	1908	Guard	All-Southern (1906, 1908)	
W. E. "Frog" Metzger	1911	Guard	Dan McGugin's first great lineman, All-Southern (1910, 1911), 1912 All-time Vandy 1st team, Associated Press Southeast Area All-Time football team 1869–1919 era, 1934 All-time Vandy team	
D. J. Moore	2008	Cornerback	Chicago Bears (2009–present)	
Hugh Morgan	1912	Center	All-Southern (1911, 1912)	
Ray Morrison	1911	Quarterback	Starter for the scoreless tie with Yale at Yale Field, All-Southern (1910, 1911), College Football Hall of Fame as coach, 1912 All-time Vandy 1st team, Associated Press Southeast Area All-Time football team 1869–1919 era, one of six players McGugin ranked as his best, 1934 All-time Vandy team, coach of Vanderbilt after McGugin, as well as during 1918	
Garland Morrow	1921	Guard	Men's basketball coach (1929–1931; 1944–1946), starter for scoreless tie with Michigan at dedication of Dudley Field	
Lee Nalley	1949	Safety	Associated Press Southeast Area All-Time football team 1920–1969 era, one of the all-time great punt returners, his records were not broken until Wes Welker did so	
Bill Neely	1910	End	Captain (1910), All-Southern (1910), the 1910 team tied Yale, older brother of Jess Neely	
Jess Neely	1922	Halfback	One of Vandy's greatest ever captains (1922), and its best passer in '22, starter for scoreless tie with Michigan at dedication of Dudley Field, longtime college coach, winningest coach in Rice University history, Vanderbilt athletic director (1967–71, 1973), College Football Hall of Fame as coach	
Frank K. "Scotty" Neill	1925	End, Punter	Starter for scoreless tie with Michigan at dedication of Dudley Field	
Doug Nettles	1974	Defensive back	National Football League player	
Warren Norman	2012	Running back		
John North	1947	End	Captain (1947), National Football League player	
Don Orr	1956	Quarterback	Led Vandy to its first bowl victory in the '55 Gator Bowl, longtime official	
Putty Overall	1921	Guard	Longtime coach at Tennessee Tech, member of 1921 SIAA champions	
Robert C. Patterson	1906	Center	All-Southern (1905), helped coach Vandy in 1908	
Jim Peebles	1942	End	National Football League player	
Dick Plasman	1936	Running back	Captain (1936), Chicago Bears (1937–41, 1944), Chicago Cardinals (1946–47), last NFL player to go without a helmet	
Joe Pritchard	1906	Tackle	All-Southern (1905, 1906), 1912 All-time Vandy 1st team, one-time coach at LSU	
Shelton Quarles	1993	Linebacker	National Football League player, Pro Bowl Selection (2002), Super Bowl Champion (XXXVII), SEC Football Legend (2008)	
Buford "Baby" Ray	1937	Tackle	National Football League player, NFL 1940s All-Decade Team, Green Bay Packers Hall of Fame	
Tom Redmond	1959	Defensive tackle	National Football League player	
Gil Reese	1925	Running back	First three-sport captain at Vandy, starter for scoreless tie with Michigan at dedication of Dudley Field, twice All-Southern, member of teams which won three straight conference titles, starter for 1924 defeat of Minnesota, Vandy's first victory over a Northern school, 1934 All-time Vandy team	
Renford Reese	1989	Cornerback		
Grantland Rice	1901	End	Vandy Athletics Hall of Fame, averaged two broken bones a year and played three years (1897–1899), lettering in '99	
Herb Rich	1949	Safety	National Football League player, Vandy Athletics Hall of Fame, SEC Football Legend (2000)	
Sean Richardson	2011	Safety	Currently plays for the Green Bay Packers	
Bob Rives	1925	Tackle	All-Southern tackle (1924–1925), Newark Bears (1926); starter for 1924 defeat of Minnesota, Vandy's first victory over a Northern school; 1934 All-time Vandy team	
Clyde Roberts	1933	Running back		
Jordan Rodgers	2011	Quarterback	Brother of Green Bay Packers quarterback Aaron Rodgers	
Ted Ross	1910	Guard	All-Southern (1909)	
Bo Rowland	1924	End	One-time coach at Henderson State, Arkansas Sports Hall of Fame	
Tom Ryan	1924	End	All-Southern (1921); starter for 1924 defeat of Minnesota, Vandy's first victory over a Northern school	
Pat Saindon	1985	Offensive lineman	National Football League player	
Red Sanders	1927	Running back	Longtime college coach, coached Vandy 1940–1942 and 1946–1948, won a National Championship with UCLA in 1954	
Chuck Scott	1984	Wide receiver	All-SEC, National Football League player, target of Whit Taylor	
Ryan Seymour	2012	Guard	National Football League player	
Alf Sharpe	1923	Center	Member of teams which won three straight conference titles, starter for scoreless tie with Michigan at dedication of Dudley Field	
Vernon Sharpe	1927	Center	All-Southern, captain (1927)	
Horace Sherrell	1908	Guard		
Ammie Sikes	1913	Running back	All-Southern (1911, 1912, 1913)	
Walter H. Simmons	1899	Halfback		
Ed Smith	1979	Linebacker	National Football League player	
Rupert Smith	1921	Running back	Leading scorer for SIAA co-champion 1921 team, played at Middle Tenn. St. with Jess Neely and Putty Overall	
Bill Spears	1928	Quarterback	All-Southern (1926, 1927), All-American (1926, 1927), one of six players McGugin ranked as his best, College Football Hall of Fame (1962)	
Zac Stacy	2012	Running back	Currently plays for the New York Jets, first Commodore to rush for over 1,000 yards back to back years; and first to rush for over 3,000 yards in career	
Matt Stewart	2000	Linebacker	National Football League player	
Ken Stone	1972	Safety	National Football League player	
Stein Stone	1908	Center	All-Southern (1904, 1905, 1906, 1907), 1912 All-time Vandy 1st team, 1934 All-time Vandy team, one-time coach at Clemson, won 4 Southern championships in his 4 years, his catch against Sewanee in 1907 was ranked by Grantland Rice as the greatest thrill seen in his years watching sports	
Hillsman Taylor	1905	Tackle	All-Southern (1905), 1912 All-time Vandy 2nd team	
Whit Taylor	1982	Quarterback	SEC Football Legend (2003), ArenaBowl 1 Champion (1987)	
John J. Tigert	1903	Running back	All-Southern (1903), College Football Hall of Fame, Rhodes Scholar	
Pat Toomay	1969	Defensive end	National Football League player	
Eric Vance	1996	Defensive back	National Football League player	
Bradley Vierling	2009	Center	Currently plays for the Pittsburgh Steelers	
Fred Vinson	1998	Cornerback	National Football League player	
Pink Wade	1921	Guard	Captain (1921), father of Bill Wade	
Bill Wade	1952	Quarterback	1st Overall pick of the 1952 NFL draft, SEC's Most Valuable Player (1951), twice All-Pro and twice a Pro Bowl selection, NFL champion (1963), Vandy Athletics Hall of Fame, SEC Football Legend (1994)	
Hek Wakefield	1924	End	All-Southern, Consensus All-American in 1924; starter for scoreless tie with Michigan at dedication of Dudley Field; member of teams which won three straight conference titles; starter for 1924 defeat of Minnesota, Vandy's first victory over a Northern school; one of six players McGugin ranked as his best; 1934 All-time Vandy team	
E. M. Waller	1927	Quarterback	Football and basketball coach at Middle Tennessee State (1933–1934), coach when they were first dubbed the "Blue Raiders"	
Thomas Welch	2009	Tackle	Currently plays for the New Orleans Saints	
Hubert Wiggs	1919	Lineman	Player and coach for the Louisville Brecks of the National Football League	
Chris Williams	2007	Guard	Currently plays for the Buffalo Bills, drafted 14th overall by the Chicago Bears	
Jimmy Williams	2000	Cornerback	Currently plays for the Seattle Seahawks	
Pryor Williams	1917	Guard	All-Southern (1915, 1916), National Football League player	
Brenard Wilson	1978	Safety	National Football League player	
Jamie Winborn	2000	Linebacker	National Football League player	
John Windham	1985	Defensive end	National Football League player, college coach	
DeMond Winston	1989	Linebacker	Captain (1989), National Football League player	
Will Wolford	1985	Tackle	First round pick of the Buffalo Bills in 1986 NFL draft, made 3 Pro Bowls, Vandy Athletics Hall of Fame, SEC Football Legend (2001)	
Todd Yoder	1999	Tight end	National Football League player	
Tom Zerfoss	1919	End	Later coached freshman football at Vanderbilt and was an assistant under McGugin; once played basketball for Kentucky, namesake of Zerfoss Student Health Center at Vanderbilt bears his name, Vanderbilt's A.D. 1940–1944	
Greg Zolman	2001	Quarterback		

== Baseball ==
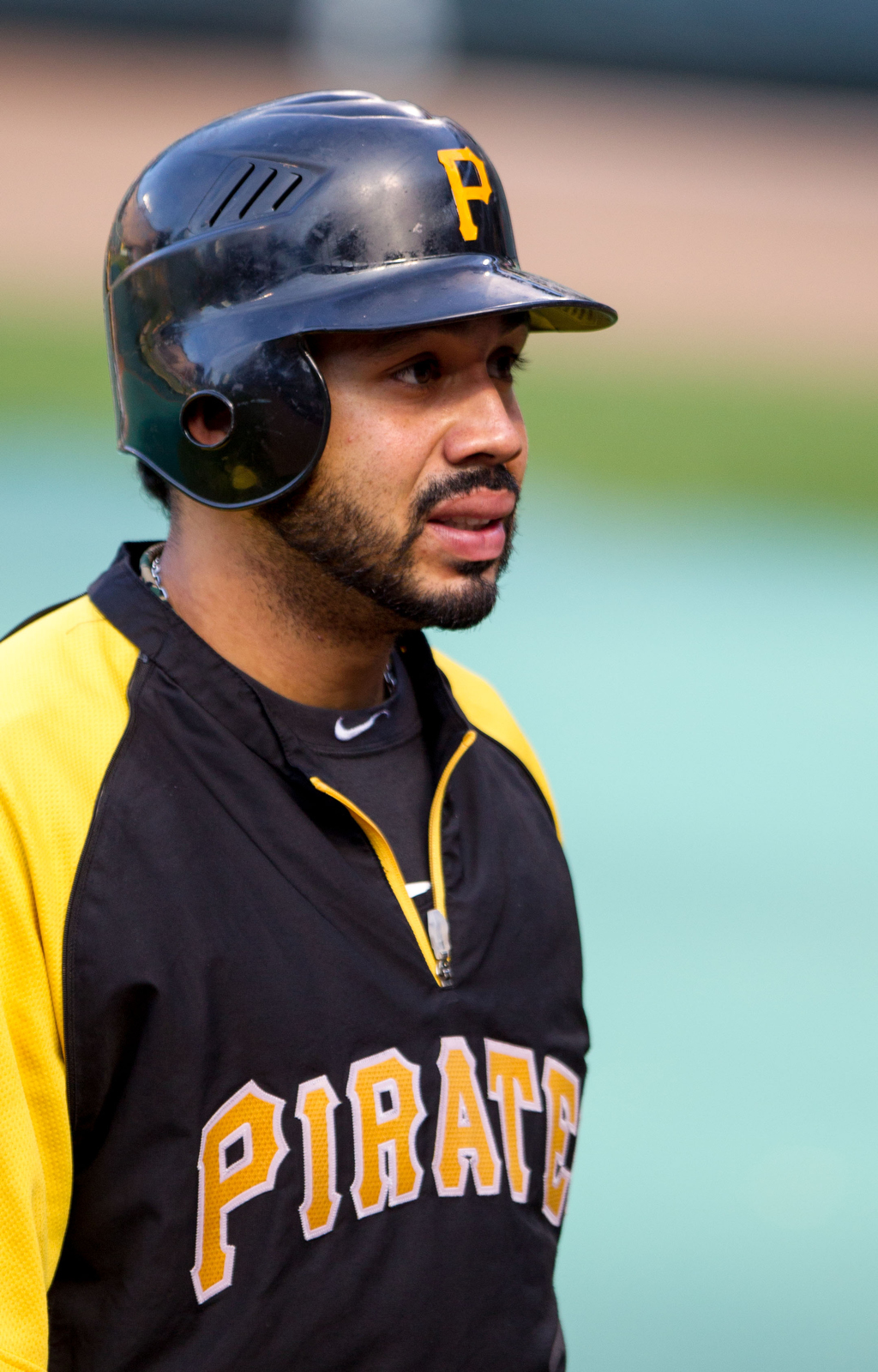
Pedro Alvarez

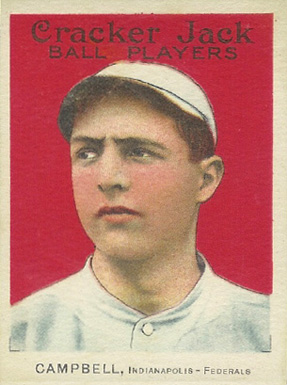
Vin Campbell

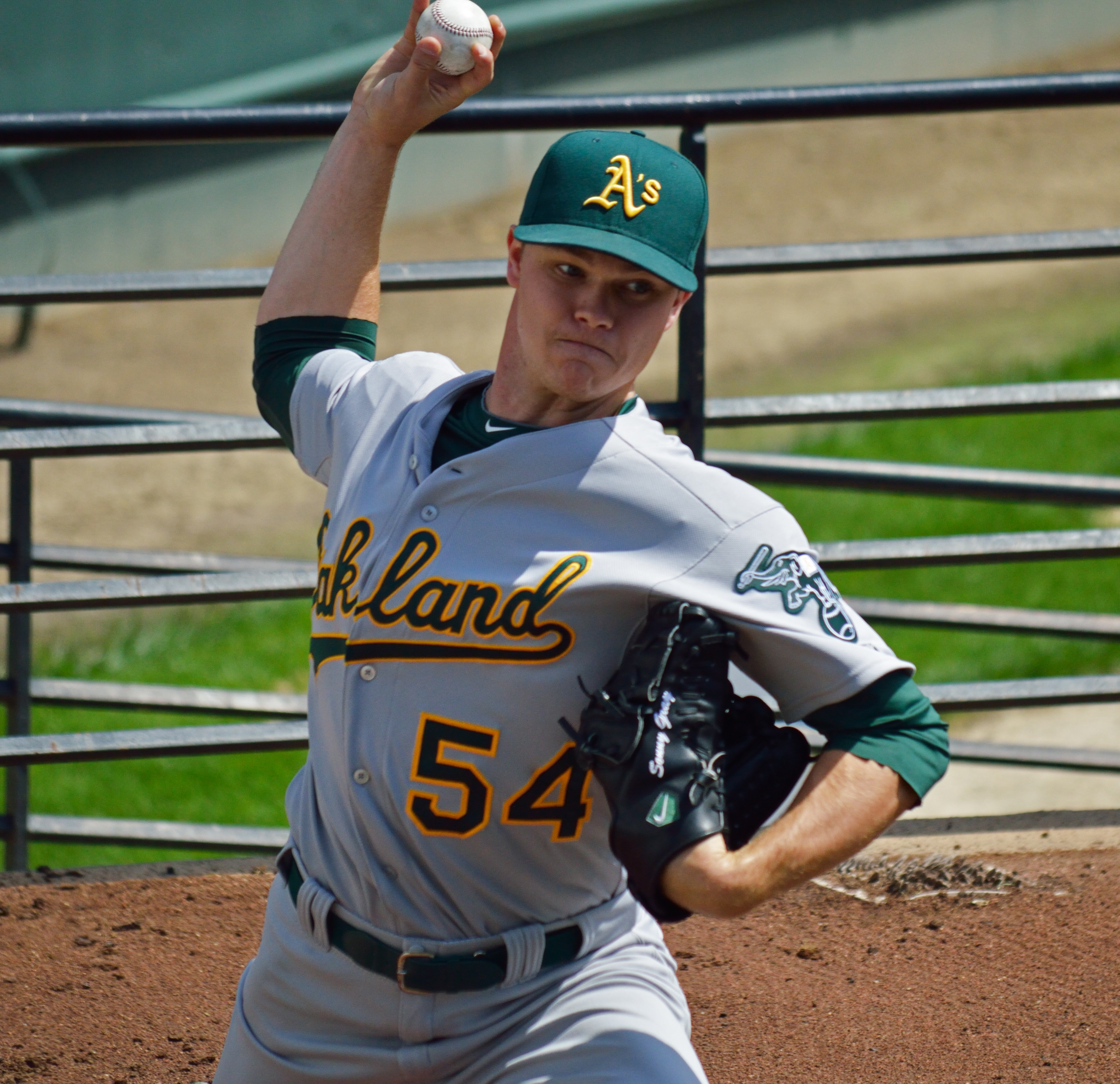
Sonny Gray

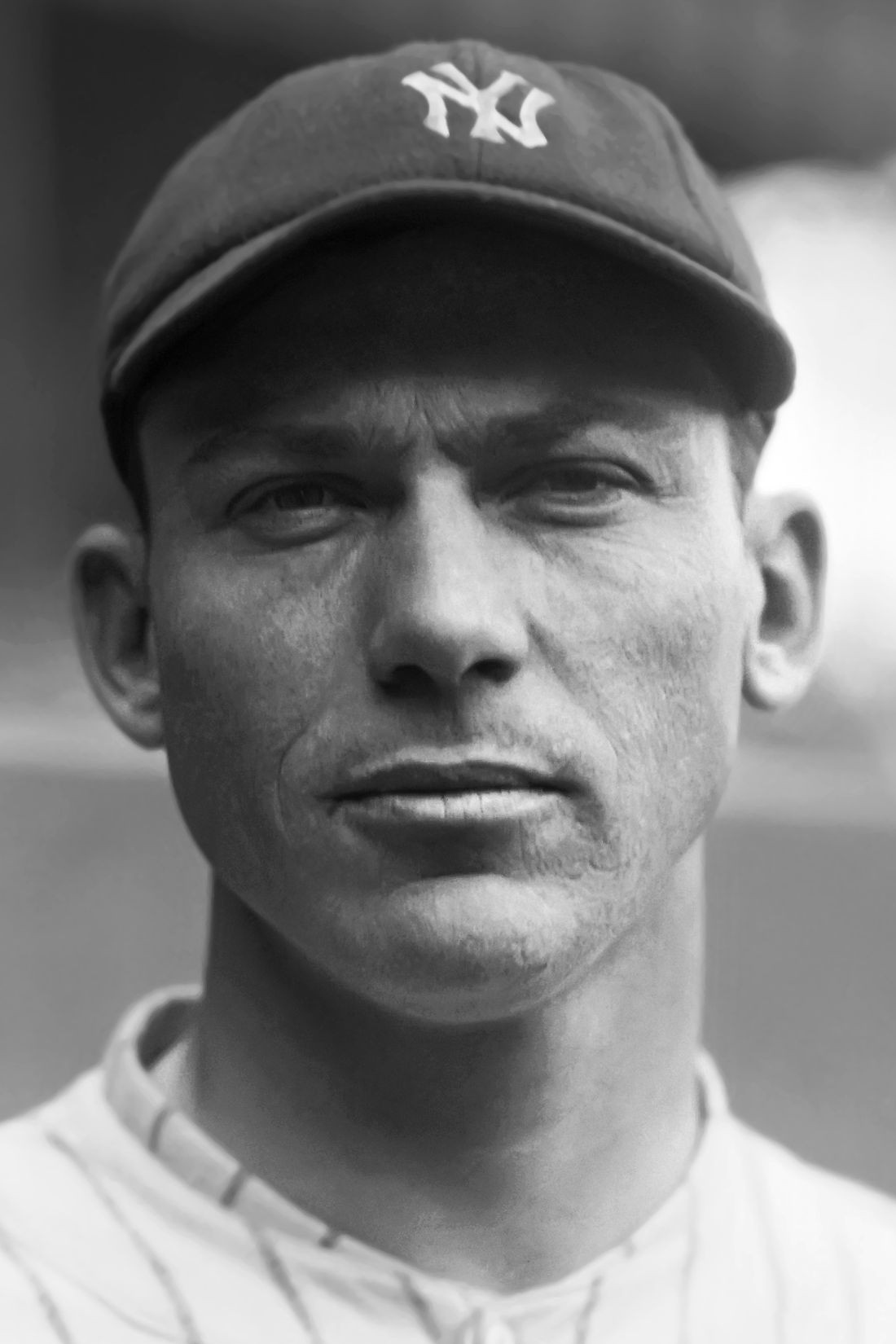
Gink Hendrick

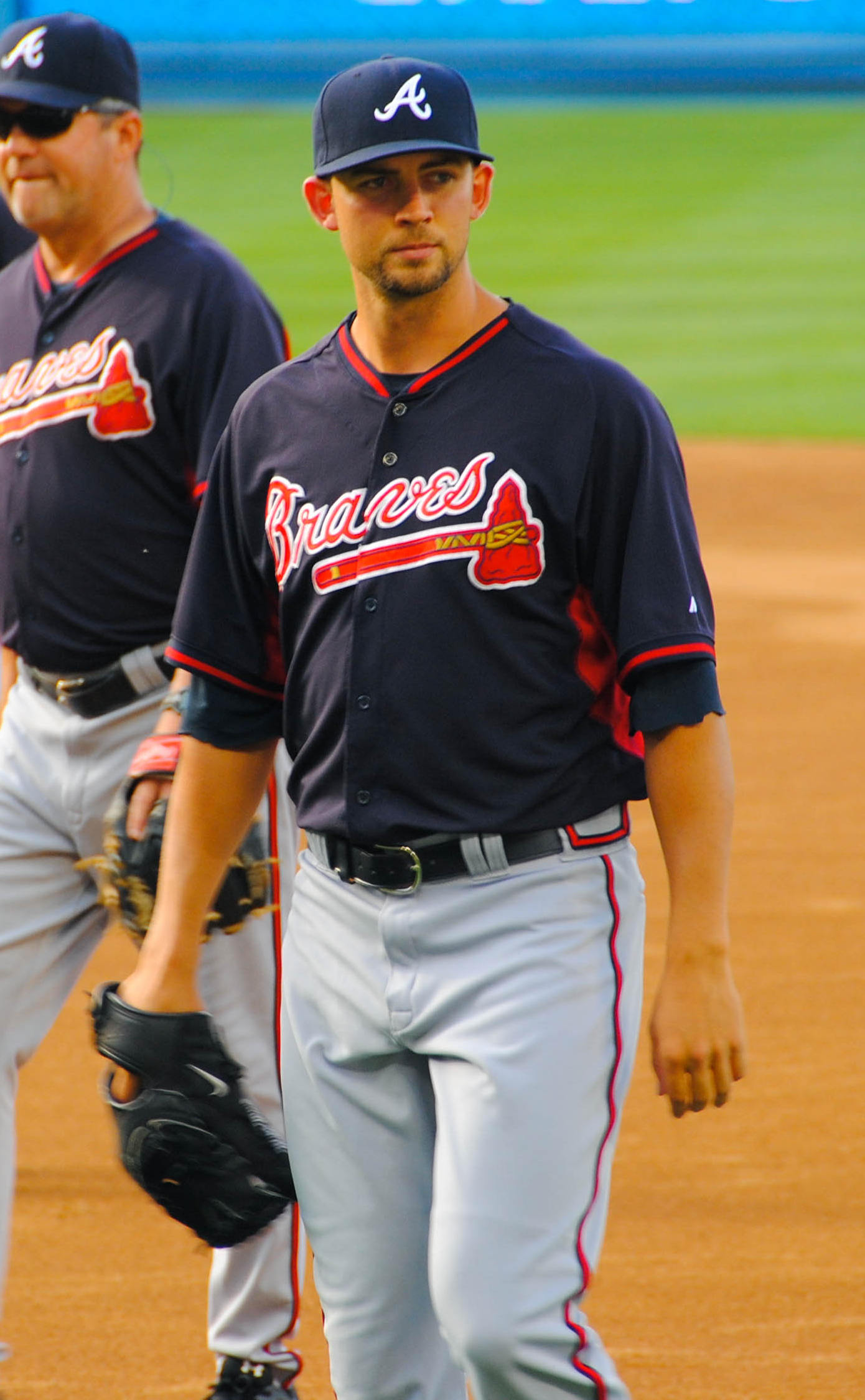
Mike Minor

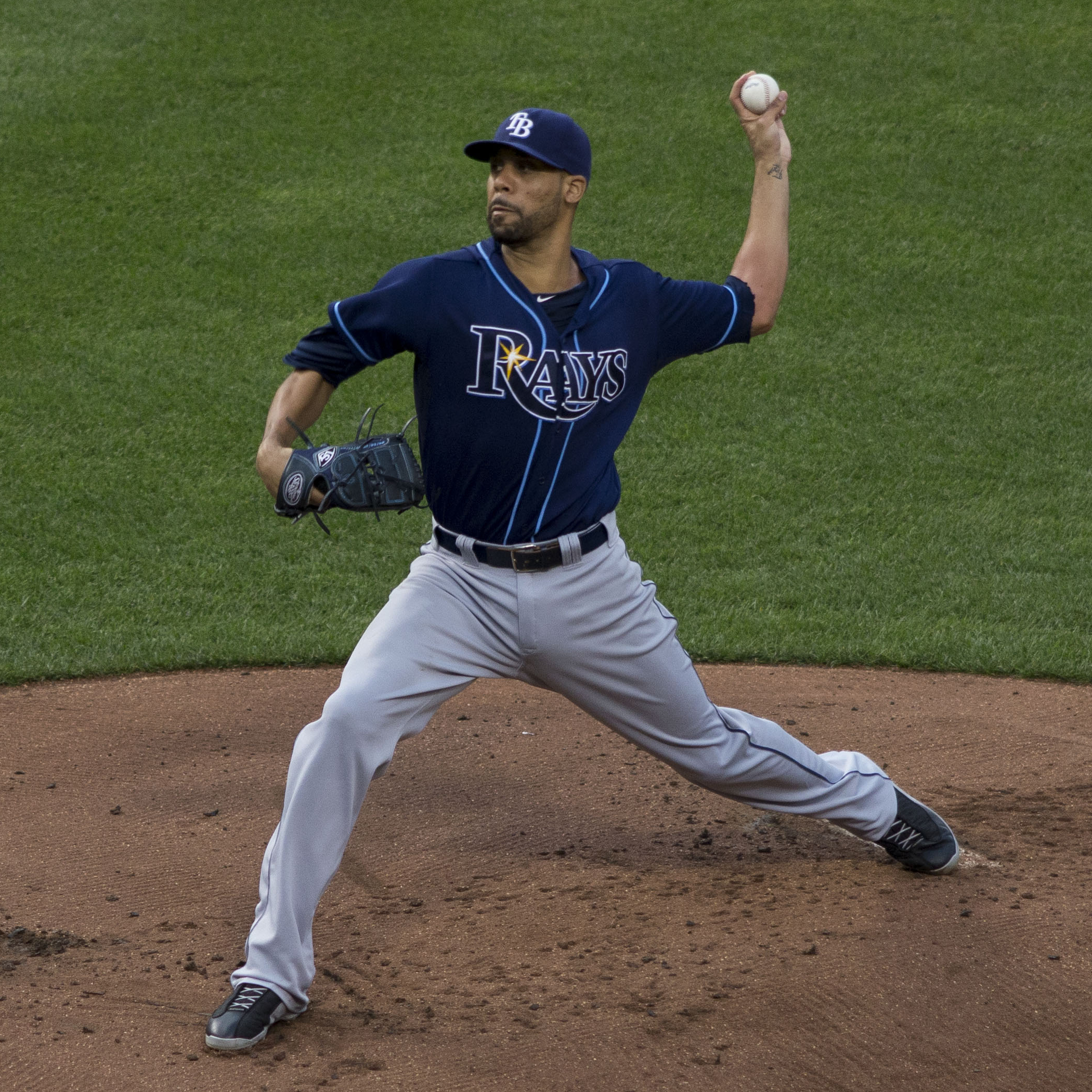
David Price

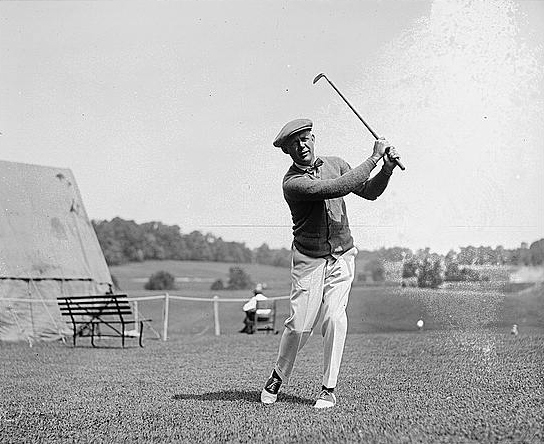
Grantland Rice

Name	Class year	Position	Notability	Reference(s)
Pedro Alvarez	2007	Third baseman	Corner infielder for the Baltimore Orioles; drafted second overall in the 2008 MLB draft	
Bob Blake	1907	?		
Lynn Bomar	1924	Catcher		
Bull Brown	1929	Right fielder		
Vin Campbell	1907	Outfielder		
Curt Casali	2011	Catcher		
Nick Christiani	2009	Pitcher		
Wilson Collins	c. 1912	Outfielder		
Joey Cora	1984	Second baseman		
Rabbit Curry	1916	Centerfielder		
Slim Embry	1923	Starting pitcher	Captain (1923), Chicago White Sox (1923)	
Ryan Flaherty	2008	Infielder	Infielder for the Baltimore Orioles	
Ewing Y. Freeland	1911	First baseman		
Carson Fulmer	2016	Pitcher		
Frank Godchaux	1921	Catcher		
Sonny Gray	2011	Pitcher	Major League Baseball starting pitcher for the Cincinnati Reds	
Gink Hendrick	1920	1B/Outfielder	New York Yankees (1923–24), Cleveland Indians (1925), Brooklyn Robins (1927–31), Cincinnati Reds (1931–32), St. Louis Cardinals (1932), Chicago Cubs (1933), Philadelphia Phillies (1934)	
Taylor Hill	2010	Relief pitcher		
Matt Kata	1999	Utility player	Major League Baseball player	
Doc Kuhn	1923	Shortstop		
Scotti Madison	1981	Third baseman	First baseball player in school history to be selected as a first team All-American, Vandy Athletics Hall of Fame	
Tot McCullough	1923	1B/OF/Pitcher		
Mike Minor	2005	Starting pitcher		
Scrappy Moore	1917	Third baseman		
Jess Neely	1922	Outfielder		
Scotty Neill	1925	Infielder		
Josh Paul	1996	Catcher	Tampa Bay Devil Rays/Rays (2006–current) Los Angeles Angels of Anaheim (2004–2005), Chicago White Sox (1999–2003)	
David Price	2007	Starting pitcher	First overall draft pick in 2007 Major League Baseball draft by Tampa Bay Devil Rays	
Andy Reese	1926	Utility		
Gil Reese	1925	Second baseman	First three-sport captain	
Grantland Rice	1901	Shortstop	Vandy Athletics Hall of Fame, captain of the 1901 team	
Fred Russell	1927	Second baseman	Chairman of the Honors Court of the College Football Hall of Fame for 29 years, protégé of Grantland Rice	
Scott Sanderson	1977	Starting pitcher		
Jeremy Sowers	2004	Pitcher	Major League Baseball player, selected out of high school with the 20th overall pick in the MLB draft but instead decided to go to Vanderbilt, preseason All-America (2004), two-time All-SEC, Vandy Athletics Hall of Fame	
Dansby Swanson	2016	Shortstop	Atlanta Braves player; first overall draft pick in 2015 by the Arizona Diamondbacks	
Drew VerHagen	2012	Pitcher		

- Antoan Richardson (born 1983), Bahamian Major League Baseball outfielder and coach

== Basketball ==
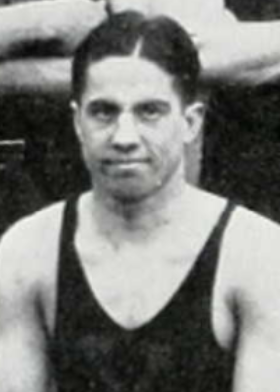
Alvin Bell

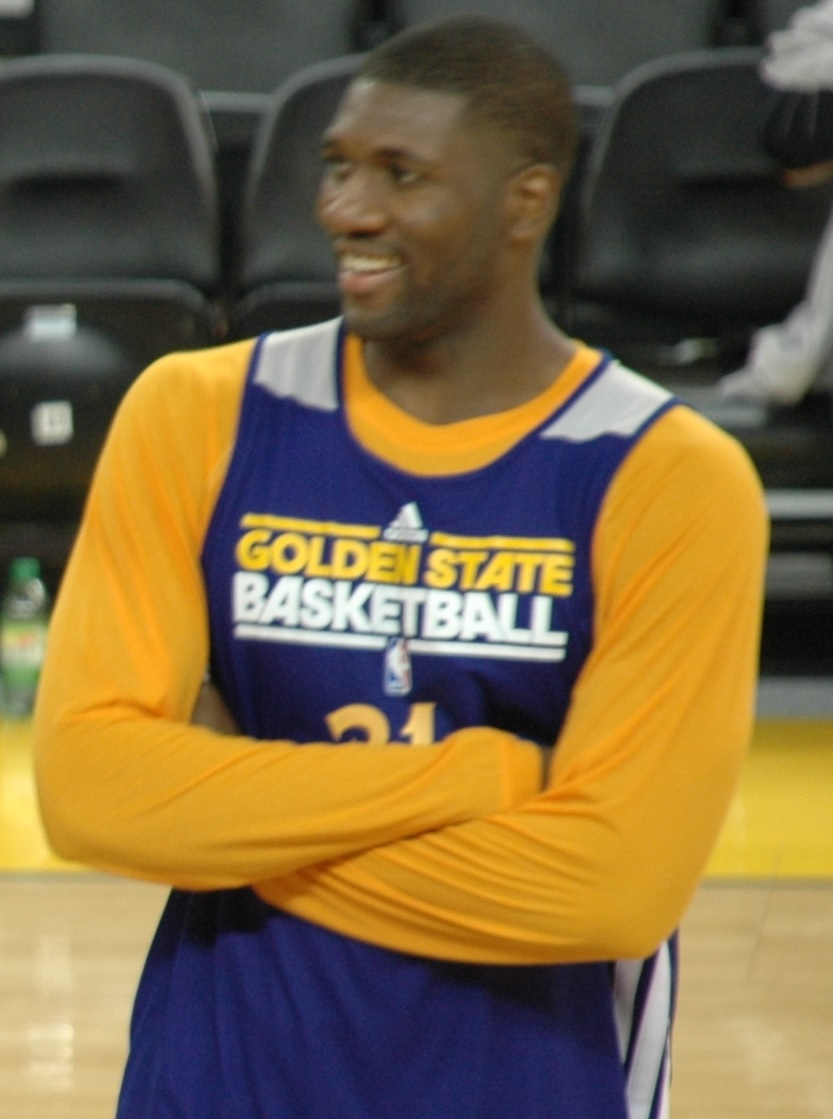
Festus Ezeli

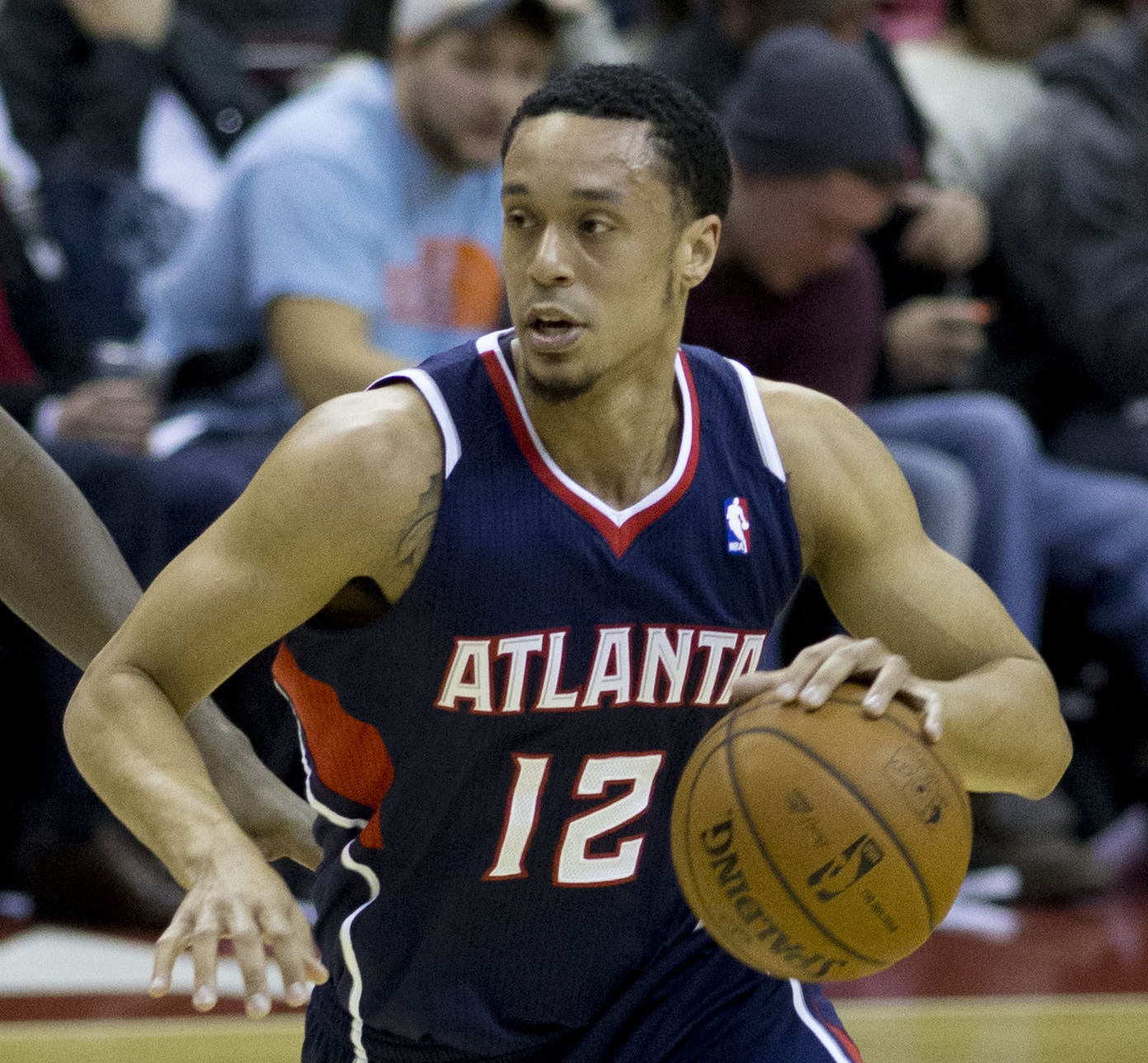
John Jenkins

Name	Class year	Position	Notability	Reference(s)
Alf Adams	1919	Guard	Member of SIAA champion squad (1920)	
Billy Joe Adcock	1950	Forward	First basketball scholarship and first basketball All-American, Vandy Athletics Hall of Fame, Tennessee Sports Hall of Fame	
Wade Baldwin IV	2018	Point guard	Basketball player for Maccabi Tel Aviv of the Israeli Basketball Premier League, formerly NBA player with the Memphis Grizzlies, left Vanderbilt in 2016 after his sophomore season	
Alvin "Pep" Bell	1924	Forward	All-Southern basketball player, officiated at the 1936 U.S. Olympic basketball trials, Arkansas Sports Hall of Fame	
Bob Blake	1907			
Lynn Bomar	1924	Forward		
Derrick Byars	2007	Small forward	SEC Player of the Year (2007), professional with several European teams	
Josh Cody	1919	Forward		
Zach Curlin	1913	Longtime Memphis Tigers coach		
Charles Davis	1981	Small forward	Finished eighth on all-time Vanderbilt scoring list with 1,675 points, first-Team All-SEC in 1979 and Third-Team All-SEC in 1978, led the Commodores in rebounding all four years, Vandy Athletics Hall of Fame	
Bruce Elder	1993	Forward		
Slim Embry	1923	Center		
Festus Ezeli	2012	Center	NBA player for the Golden State Warriors	
Butch Feher	1976	Shooting guard		
Johnny "Red" Floyd	1920	Guard	Coached at Middle Tennessee State; namesake of Johnny "Red" Floyd Stadium	
Jeff Fosnes	1976	Forward	First Academic All-American, and only two-time Academic All-American, in Vanderbilt basketball history, fourth-round draft pick of the Golden State Warriors (1976)	
Shan Foster	2008	Shooting guard	Vandy Athletics Hall of Fame	
Matt Freije	2004	Power forward	Wooden Award finalist (2003–04); Atlanta Hawks (2006), New Orleans Hornets (2004–05), originally a second-round draft pick of the Miami Heat (2004)	
Barry Goheen	1989	Guard		
Damian Jones	2017	Center	NBA player with the Golden State Warriors, left Vanderbilt in 2016 after his junior season	
John Jenkins	2012	Shooting guard	first-team All-SEC (2011, 2012), member of the USA national team at the 2011 Summer Universiade, NBA player with the Atlanta Hawks	
Frank Kornet	1989	Power forward		
Doc Kuhn	1923	Guard		
Dan Langhi	2000	Small forward	Houston Rockets (2000–02), Phoenix Suns (2002–03), Golden State Warriors (2003), Milwaukee Bucks (2003)	
Clyde Lee	1966	Power forward	Averaged the most points per game in school history; the balconies on the south end of Memorial Gymnasium are commonly referred to as the "balconies that Clyde built"; jersey number retired; SEC Player of the Year (1965–66), All-American (1966); third overall pick of the San Francisco/Golden State Warriors (1966–74); also played for the Atlanta Hawks (1975) and Philadelphia 76ers (1975–76), Vandy Athletics Hall of Fame	
Billy McCaffrey	1993	Guard	Two-time All-American, led Vanderbilt to highest national ranking of number 5, holds record for most assists in a game at 14, SEC Player of the Year in 1993	
Ronnie McMahan	1995	Swingman		
Garland Morrow	1922	Forward	Men's basketball coach (1929–1931; 1944–1946)	
Will Perdue	1988	Center	1988 SEC Player of the Year, 1988 AP All-American Third Team, finished career with Vanderbilt record .606 field goal percentage, four-time NBA champion; Portland Trail Blazers (2000–01), San Antonio Spurs (1995–99), first-round draft pick (1988, 11th overall) of the Chicago Bulls (1988–95), Vandy Athletics Hall of Fame	
Gil Reese	1925	Guard/forward	First three-sport captain	
Stein Stone	1908			
Jeffery Taylor	2012	Small forward	Three NBA seasons; currently playing in Spain with Real Madrid	
Jeff Turner	1984	Power forward		
Jan van Breda Kolff	1974	Small forward		
Perry Wallace	1970	Power forward	First African-American basketball player in the Southeastern Conference; law professor at American University; jersey number retired; Vandy Athletics Hall of Fame	
Tom Zerfoss	1919	Forward/center	Also played basketball at Kentucky, Vanderbilt's AD 1940–1944	

== Golf ==
Name	Class year	Position	Notability	Reference(s)
Jon Curran	2008			
Luke List	2007			
Brandt Snedeker	2003	Vanderbilt's most decorated golfer, Southeastern Conference Player of the Year and First-Team All-American (2003), won the 2003 United States Pub Links Championship, All-Conference all four years he played at Vanderbilt, reached the No. 1 individual ranking in the national Golfweek/Sagarin Poll in November 2002, Vandy Athletics Hall of Fame		

== Soccer ==
Name	Class year	Position	Notability	Reference(s)
Joe Germanese	2007			
John Krause	2005			
Tony Kuhn	1997			
Kenny Schoeni	2006			
Jerry Sularz	1967			

== Tennis ==
Name	Class year	Position	Notability	Reference(s)
Joe C. Davis, Jr.	1942			
Julie Ditty	2003	31 wins in 1999 is best single-season mark for a Commodore; led Vanderbilt to first NCAA team championship final in school history in 2001; 114 singles wins is second-best in Vanderbilt history; ITA All-American 1999–2001; Vandy Athletics Hall of Fame		
Chris Groer	1996	All-American (1996), holds best Vanderbilt doubles winning percentage with partner Krunch Kloberdanz, Vandy Athletics Hall of Fame		
Bobby Reynolds	2003			
Paul Thurmond	1996			
