= 1911 College Football All-Southern Team =

American football players

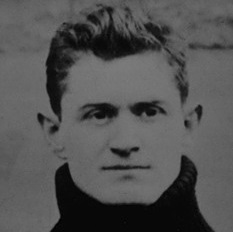
Ray Morrison

The 1911 College Football All-Southern Team consists of American football players selected to the College Football All-Southern Teams selected by various organizations for the 1911 Southern Intercollegiate Athletic Association football season. Ray Morrison and Harry Costello were selected for Outing magazine's "Football Honor List for 1911" selected by coaches from the East and West. Vanderbilt won the SIAA championship.

== Consensus eleven ==
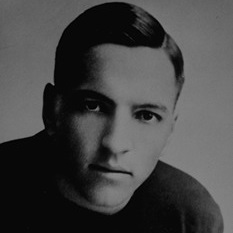
Bob McWhorter

John Heisman's All-Southern eleven included:

- Rube Barker, tackle for Mississippi. Later, he was a practicing physician in Oakland, Illinois.
- John E. Davis, fullback for Auburn. He was later a notable architect in Birmingham.
- Ewing Y. Freeland, tackle for Vanderbilt, known as "Big 'un," later coached at various institutions in Texas.
- Roy Goree, end for Georgia Tech. Both his sons also played for Tech.
- Lewie Hardage, halfback for Vanderbilt. Edwin Pope's Football's Greatest Coaches reads "A lightning-swift backfield of Lew Hardage, Wilson Collins, Ammie Sikes, and Ray Morrison pushed Vandy through 1911 with only a 9-8 loss to Michigan." The Atlanta Constitution voted it the best backfield in the South.
- Bob McWhorter, halfback for Georgia.He was inducted into the College Football Hall of Fame in 1954. Sportswriter Dick Jemison said "When you mention football to an Athens fan its definition is Bob McWhorter, and vice-versa." He was selected for the Associated Press Southeast Area All-Time football team 1869-1919 era. McWhorter went on to have a lengthy law career.
- Will Metzger, guard for Vanderbilt, known as "Frog," selected for an Associated Press Southeast Area All-Time football team 1869-1919 era.
- Hugh Morgan, center for Vanderbilt. Later, he was a world-renowned internist and medical professor.
- Ray Morrison, quarterback for Vanderbilt, selected as the quarterback and kick returner for an Associated Press Southeast Area All-Time football team 1869-1919 era. He was later a coach at various institutions including SMU and Vanderbilt after McGugin. He was inducted into the College Football Hall of Fame as a coach in 1954.
- David Peacock, guard for Georgia. An Athens newspaper said he was "probably the most aggressive lineman in the South."
- By Walton, end for Mississippi. He coached basketball at Ole Miss next year.

== All-Southerns of 1911 ==
=== Ends ===
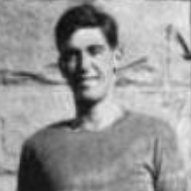
Jenks Gillem

- Jenks Gillem, Sewanee (H-2, DJ, NS-1, BS-2, NT)
- By Walton, Mississippi (H-1, NS-1)
- Hargrove Van de Graaff, Alabama (H-2, DJ, NS-2, BS-1)
- Roy Goree, Georgia Tech (H-1, NS-2)
- Enoch Brown, Vanderbilt (BS-2, NT)

=== Tackles ===
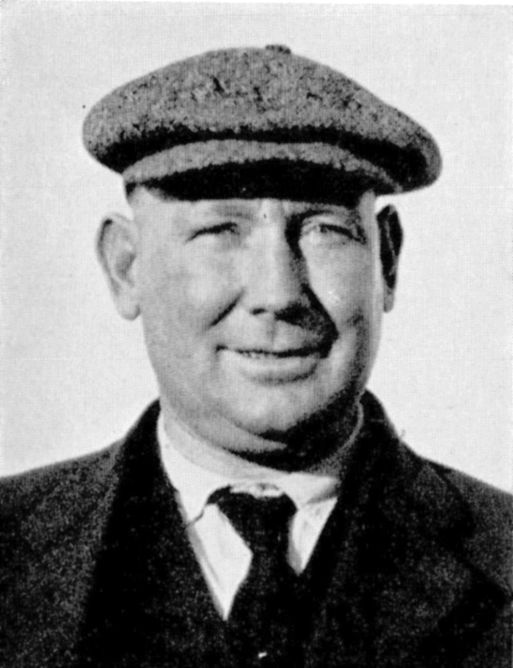
Ewing Y. Freeland

- Ewing Y. Freeland†, Vanderbilt (H-1, DJ, NS-1, BS-1, NT)
- Rube Barker, Mississippi (H-2, DJ, NS-1, BS-1, NT [as g])
- Homer Cogdell, Auburn (NS-2, BS-1 [as e])
- B. J. Lamb, Auburn (H-1, BS-2)
- Tom Brown, Vanderbilt (H-2, NT)
- Jim Stoney, Sewanee (NS-2)
- Head Ellard, Mississippi A & M (BS-2)

=== Guards ===
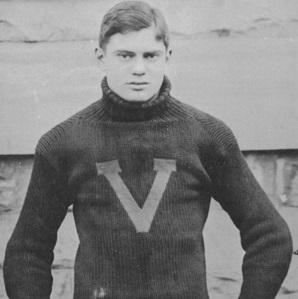
Will Metzger

- Will Metzger, Vanderbilt (H-1, DJ, NS-2, BS-1, NT)
- Big Chief Bonner, Auburn (DJ, NS-1, BS-1)
- David Peacock, Georgia (H-1, NS-2, BS-2)
- A. P. Mills, Mississippi A & M (NS-1)
- Burton Gray Allen, Auburn (H-2)
- Fred Carter, Mississippi (H-2)
- Rip Major, Auburn (BS-2)

=== Centers ===
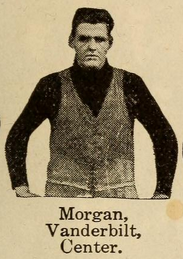
Hugh Morgan

- Hugh Morgan†, Vanderbilt (H-1, DJ, NS-1, BS-1, NT)
- Homer Grice, Mercer (H-2, BS-2)
- John C. Adams, Mississippi (NS-2)

=== Quarterbacks ===
- Ray Morrison†, Vanderbilt (College Football Hall of Fame) (H-1, DJ, NS-1, BS-1, NT)
- Blondie Williams, Mississippi A & M (H-2 [as hb], NS-2)
- Kid Woodruff, Georgia (H-2, BS-2)

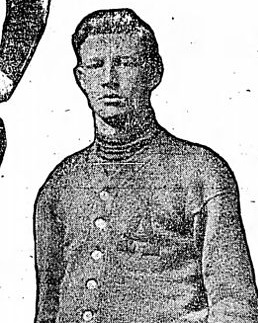
John E. Davis

=== Halfbacks ===
- Lewie Hardage†, Vanderbilt (H-1, DJ, NS-1, BS-1, NT)
- Bob McWhorter†, Georgia (College Football Hall of Fame) (H-1, DJ, NS-1 [as fb], BS-1, NT)
- Pete Shields, Mississippi (NS-1)
- William C. Cahall, Mississippi (NS-2, BS-2)
- Wilson Collins, Vanderbilt (H-2)
- Ammie Sikes, Vanderbilt (NS-2)

=== Fullbacks ===
- John E. Davis, Auburn (H-1, NS-2, BS-1, NT)
- Pat Patterson, Georgia Tech (DJ, BS-2)
- Steve Mitchell, Mississippi (H-2)

== Key ==
Bold = consensus choice by a majority of the selectors

† = Unanimous selection

H = selected by John Heisman. He had a first and second team.

DJ = selected by Dick Jemison in the Atlanta Constitution.

NS = selected by Nathan Stauffer of Collier's Weekly. He had a first and second team.

BS = selected by Bill Streit, assistant coach at Auburn University. He had a first and second team.

NT = selected by Spick Hall in the Nashville Tennessean.

== See also ==
- 1911 College Football All-America Team
