= 1912 Vanderbilt Commodores baseball team =

American college baseball season

1912 Vanderbilt Commodores baseball

SIAA champion
- Conference: Southern Intercollegiate Athletic Association
- Record: 13–4 (12–2 SIAA)
- Head coach: Herbert Sanborn
- Captain: Ray Morrison
- Home stadium: Dudley Field

The 1912 Vanderbilt Commodores baseball team represented the Vanderbilt Commodores of the Vanderbilt University in the 1912 NCAA baseball season, winning the SIAA championship.

== Schedule and results ==
The game with Tech on April 20 was cancelled due to rain.

Legend
Vanderbilt win
Vanderbilt loss
Tie

1912 Vanderbilt Commodores baseball game log

Regular Season
Date	Opponent	Site/stadium	Score	Overall record	SIAA record
March 29	Auburn		L 6–7	0–1	
March 30	Auburn		W 7–6	1–1	
April 3	Nashville Vols		L 0–9 (Note: Exhibition)	1–1	
April 4	Nashville Vols		L 3–17 (Note: Exhibition)	1–1	
April 12	Michigan		L 3–4	1–2	
April 13	Michigan		L 2–4	1–3	
April 13	Michigan		W 11–10	2–3	
April 17	Georgia		W 1–0	3–3	
April 18	Georgia		W 2–0	4–3	
April 19	Georgia Tech		L 2–6	4–4	
April 26	Georgia Tech		W 2–0	5–4	
April 27	Georgia Tech		W 2–1	6–4	
April 29	Mississippi		W 3–2	7–4	
April 30	Mississippi		W 6–4	8–4	
May 1	Mississippi		W 4–1	9–4	
May 10	Alabama		W 4–3	10–4	
May 11	Alabama		W 5–4	11–4	
May 25	Sewanee		W	12–4	
May 27	Sewanee		W	13–4	

== Players ==
- Wilson Collins - pitcher
- Kent Morrison - pitcher
- Jones - pitcher
- Will Herrin - pitcher
- Ray Morrison - catcher
- Enoch Brown - catcher
- Ewing Y. Freeland - first base
- Richard Lyle - second base
- Lloyd - shortstop
- W. H. Turner - third base
- Lew Hardage - left field
- Walter Morgan - center field
- Joe Covington - right field

=== Staff ===
- Jack Sevier-manager
