= Ray Morrison =

American athlete and coach (1885–1982)

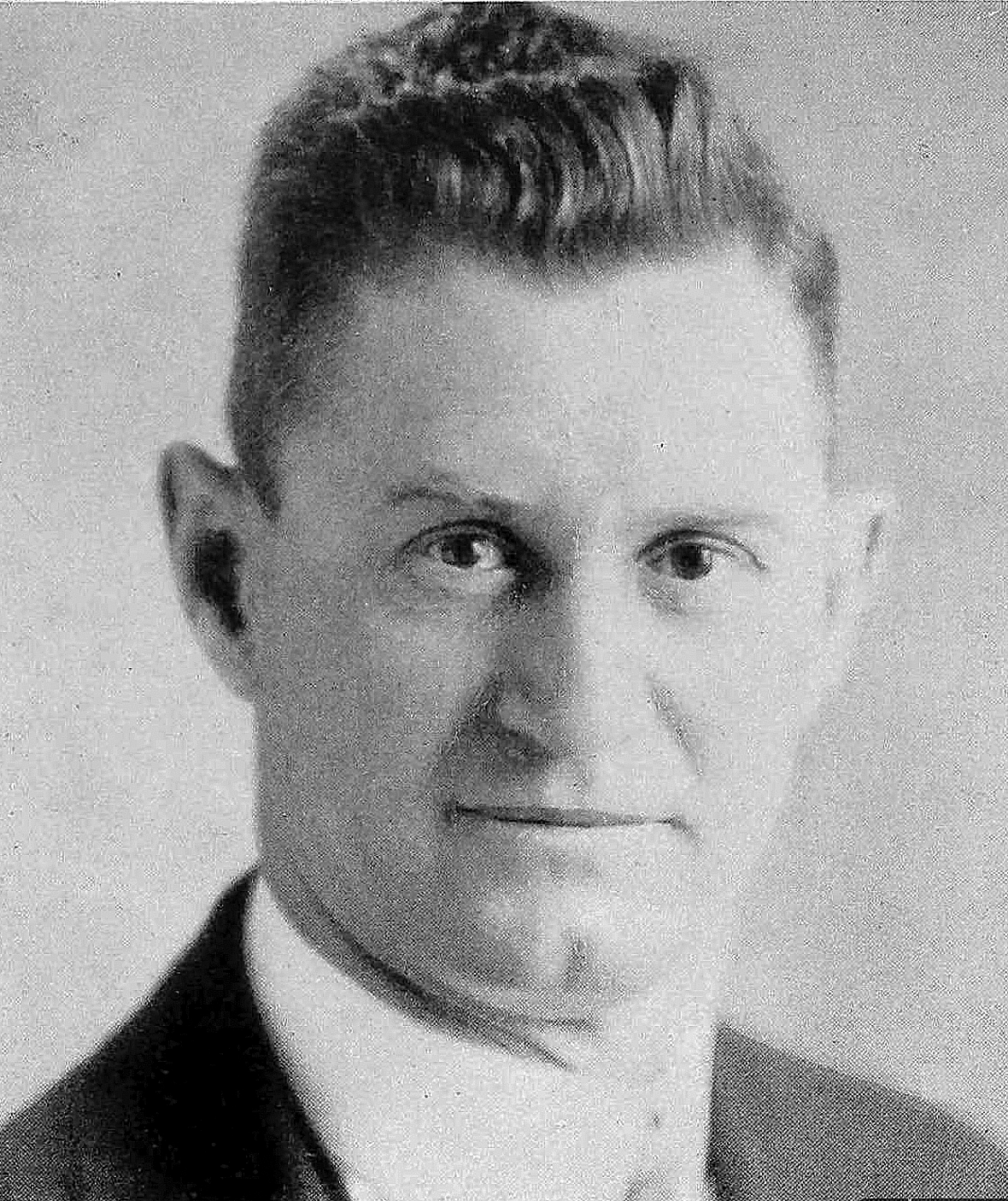

Biographical details
- Born: February 28, 1885; Sugar Branch, Indiana, U.S.
- Died: November 19, 1982 (aged 97); Miami Springs, Florida, U.S.

Playing career

Football
- 1908–1911: Vanderbilt
- Positions: Quarterback (football); Catcher, Outfielder (baseball)

Coaching career (HC unless noted)

Football
- 1915–1916: SMU
- 1918: Vanderbilt
- 1921: SMU (assistant)
- 1922–1934: SMU
- 1935–1939: Vanderbilt
- 1940–1948: Temple
- 1949–1952: Austin

Basketball
- 1918–1920: Vanderbilt

Baseball
- 1919: Vanderbilt

Head coaching record
- Overall: 155–130–33 (football); 8–2 (basketball); 3–3 (baseball)
- Bowls: 0–1

Accomplishments and honors

Championships
- Football; As coach, 3 SWC (1923, 1926, 1931); As player, 2 SIAA (1910, 1911); Baseball; As player, 2 SIAA (1910, 1912)

Awards
- 2x All-Southern (1910, 1911); AP Southeast All-Time team (1869-1919); 1934 All-time Vandy team SEC Coach of the Year (1937)
- College Football Hall of Fame; Inducted in 1954 (profile)

Jesse Raymond Morrison (February 28, 1885 – November 19, 1982) was an American football and baseball player and a coach of football, basketball, and baseball. He served as the head football coach at Southern Methodist University (1915–1916, 1922–1934), Vanderbilt University (1918, 1935–1939), Temple University (1940–1948), and Austin College (1949–1952), compiling a career college football record of 155–130–33. He was inducted into the College Football Hall of Fame as a coach in 1954.

As a player, he was one of the greatest quarterbacks in the history of Vanderbilt Commodores football. Morrison was selected as the quarterback and kick returner for an Associated Press Southeast Area All-Time football team 1869–1919 era. He piloted the team to two Southern Intercollegiate Athletic Association (SIAA) titles in 1910 and 1911. The 1910 team fought defending national champion Yale to a scoreless tie. Yale coach Ted Coy called Morrison "the greatest player I have seen in years." In 1911, Coy selected Morrison All-American and the Atlanta Constitution voted Vanderbilt the best backfield in the South.

He took over as coach at his alma mater Vanderbilt after the retirement of legendary coach Dan McGugin. Morrison was the Southeastern Conference (SEC) Coach of the Year in 1937. He was also the first head coach in the history of SMU Mustangs football, and helped popularize the forward pass in the Southwest with his "Flying Circus" teams, most notably when led by Gerald Mann.

== Early years ==
Ray Morrison was born on February 28, 1885, in Sugar Branch, Indiana. Soon after the family moved to McKenzie, Tennessee, where Morrison attended school. He also spent a year at McTyeire School for Boys.

== Vanderbilt University ==
To achieve funds for college, Morrison worked on a dredge boat on the Mississippi River for a year. Morrison won Bachelor of Ugliness for the class of 1912. He played on the football and baseball teams with his brother Kent.

=== Football ===
He played football as a prominent quarterback and halfback for Dan McGugin's Vanderbilt football teams from 1908 to 1911. He is considered one of the best quarterbacks in Vanderbilt's long history. The team posted a 30–6–2 record during his four years. He was selected for an all-time Vanderbilt team in 1934. Morrison was selected as the quarterback and kick returner for an Associated Press Southeast Area All-Time football team 1869–1919 era. In 1915, John Heisman selected his 30 greatest Southern football players, and Morrison was one of two quarterbacks selected. He weighed some 155 to 159 pounds.

==== 1908 ====
The 1908 squad was hampered by a wealth of sophomores, which McGugin with the help of halfback Morrison led to a 7–2–1 campaign, including a loss to rival Sewanee. In a 16–9 defeat of Tennessee, widely considered their greatest team at that point, Walker Leach got loose for a 60-yard run on a fake kick, tracked down by Morrison and stopped short of the goal.

==== 1909 ====
The 1909 team lost to SIAA champion Sewanee, its first loss to a Southern team in six years.

==== 1910 ====
The 1910 team won the SIAA title and fought defending national champion Yale to a scoreless tie on Yale Field. Yale coach Ted Coy called Morrison "the greatest player I have seen in years." He was selected All-Southern by several writers.

Vanderbilt won a close game over Mississippi 9–2. Late in the first quarter, Morrison returned a punt 90 yards for Vanderbilt's touchdown. John Heisman was the game's field judge, and McGugin did not want to show too much, playing Heisman's Georgia Tech in two weeks. Morrison was the star of the Georgia Tech game, scoring two touchdowns.

==== 1911 ====
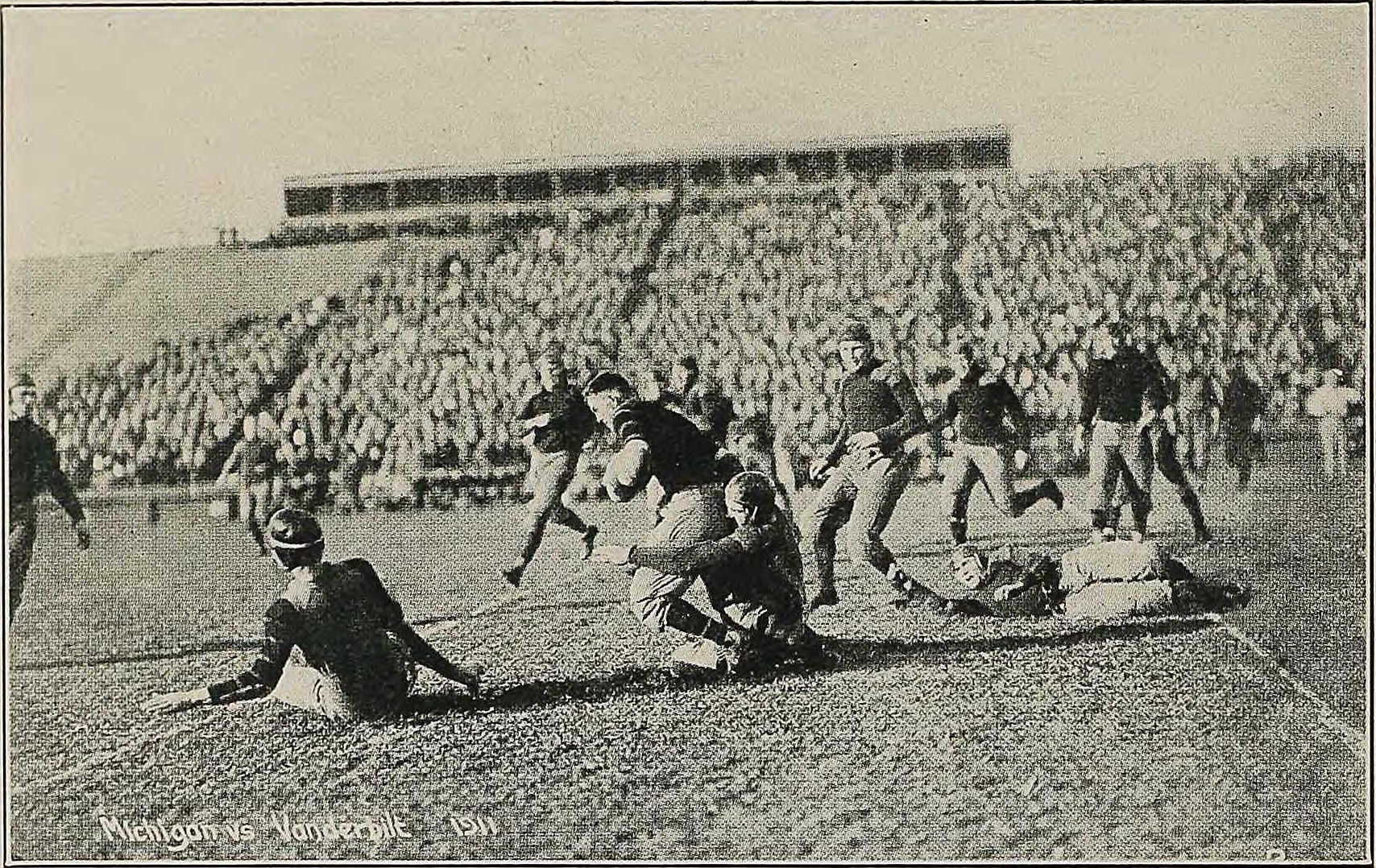
Morrison running against Michigan in 1911

Edwin Pope's Football's Greatest Coaches on the 1911 team reads "A lightning-swift backfield of Lew Hardage, Wilson Collins, Ammie Sikes, and Ray Morrison pushed Vandy through 1911 with only a 9–8 loss to Michigan." The Atlanta Constitution voted it the best backfield in the South. Ted Coy selected Morrison All-American. He was unanimously selected All-Southern.

Morrison, Hardage and Rabbi Robins had two touchdowns each in a 45–0 win over Central. Morrison had two short touchdown runs in a 17–0 win over Georgia, and had a 22-yard run on a fake punt. In "easily the greatest southern game of the season", Vanderbilt claimed the SIAA title by beating Mississippi 21–0. Morrison had a 70-yard run, and on a fake punt out of his own end zone ran for 75 yards. Against Sewanee, Morrison threw a touchdown pass to Hardage, as well as had a short touchdown run.

=== Baseball ===
Morrison also played on the baseball team, moved to the outfield from catcher in his junior year, and back to catcher as a senior. The 1910 and 1912 teams won the SIAA. Morrison was captain of the 1912 team.

== Coaching years ==
Morrison first taught and was athletics director at Branham & Hughes Military Academy in Spring Hill. Upon American entry into World War I, Morrison went to Fort Oglethorpe. In 1919, Morrison spent a year at Gulf Coast Military Academy as athletics director and teacher.

=== SMU ===
Ray Morrison was the first head coach in the history of SMU Mustangs football. He won just two games in two years from 1915 to 1916.

==== Return ====
In 1920, Morrison returned to SMU. He notably brought the forward pass to the southwest during his time at SMU. Morrison was one of the first to pass not just on first down, but on first and second down too. His teams earned the nickname the "Flying Circus".

They won the 1923, 1926, and 1931 Southwest Conference (SWC) titles. An 18-game unbeaten streak was ended in the 1925 Dixie Classic, with a touchdown off a tipped pass for West Virginia Wesleyan's Gale Bullman, and a 30-yard field goal missed in the final minute. Morrison's best passer, Hall of Fame quarterback Gerald Mann, led the team to the 1926 title. The 1929 team was undefeated, but with four ties, including one with undefeated TCU to close the season.

=== Vanderbilt ===
He coached Vanderbilt in 1918 when McGugin left for the military, and led the Vanderbilt team to a 4–2 record. The team beat Tennessee 76–0, the largest margin of victory in the history of the rivalry. Former Nashville Banner sportswriter Fred Russell's book Fifty Years of Vanderbilt Football published in 1938, wrote:

"Salient after salient was wiped out by Gen. Morrison's forces and Tennessee's reinforcements could not check the tide. The retreat turned into a bloody, hopeless rout. Berryhill was cited for bravery for his wonderful outflanking the enemy, by which he took six positions (touchdowns) single-handedly. The result was 76−0."

Morrison was also the head basketball coach at Vanderbilt for one season in 1918–19, tallying a mark of 8–2, and the head baseball coach at the school in 1919, notching a record of 3–3.

==== Return ====
Upon the retirement of the legendary McGugin, Morrison was hand-picked as successor at his alma mater. Morrison brought his own staff from SMU and neglected the retained Josh Cody's coaching abilities.

Fred Russell offered this description of Morrison upon his arrival as coach of Vanderbilt:

A gentle, soft-spoken person who talks out of the side of his mouth with convincing firmness. Eyes with a permanent twinkle, tiny wrinkles about them when he smiles, but a set jaw that seems to enclose teeth constantly gritted tighter. A happy combination that blends austerity and affability into well-nigh perfect personality--that's the Ray Morrison of today who was known to Nashvillians twenty-five years ago as Vanderbilt's whirling quarterback.

Morrison's first team in his second stint finished second place in the Southeastern Conference (SEC), led by captain and SEC player of the year Willie Geny. The 1936 team was captained by Dick Plasman, the last NFL player to play without a helmet. The 1937 team upset LSU on a hidden ball trick, the school's first-ever victory over a ranked opponent (the AP Poll began in 1936). The team's captain was SEC player of the year Carl Hinkle and also featured Baby Ray. Morrison was awarded SEC Coach of the Year in 1937.

=== Temple ===
After the 1939 season, Morrison resigned from his position at Vanderbilt to go to Temple, with Cody as his line coach. He resigned from Temple in 1949.

=== Austin College ===
He finished his career at Austin College. He quit to take over "development and public relations" at SMU, a post he held for eleven years.

== Death ==
Morrison died at the home of his son in Miami Springs, Florida, at the age of 97.

== Head coaching record ==
=== Football ===
Year	Team	Overall	Conference	Standing	Bowl/playoffs
SMU Mustangs (Texas Intercollegiate Athletic Association) (1915–1916)
1915	SMU	2–5			
1916	SMU	0–8–2			
Vanderbilt Commodores (Southern Intercollegiate Athletic Association) (1918)
1918	Vanderbilt	4–2	2–0	T–2nd	
SMU Mustangs (Southwest Conference) (1922–1934)
1922	SMU	6–3–1	2–2	T–3rd	
1923	SMU	9–0	5–0	1st	
1924	SMU	5–1–4	2–0–4	2nd	L Dixie Classic
1925	SMU	5–2–2	1–1–2	4th	
1926	SMU	8–0–1	5–0	1st	
1927	SMU	7–2	4–1	2nd	
1928	SMU	6–3–1	2–2–1	5th	
1929	SMU	6–0–4	3–0–2	2nd	
1930	SMU	6–3–1	2–2–1	T–4th	
1931	SMU	9–1–1	5–0–1	1st	
1932	SMU	3–7–2	1–4–1	T–5th	
1933	SMU	4–7–1	2–4	6th	
1934	SMU	8–2–2	3–2–1	3rd	
SMU:		84–44–22			
Vanderbilt Commodores (Southeastern Conference) (1935–1939)
1935	Vanderbilt	7–3	5–1	2nd	
1936	Vanderbilt	3–5–1	1–3–1	9th	
1937	Vanderbilt	7–2	4–2	4th	
1938	Vanderbilt	6–3	4–3	6th	
1939	Vanderbilt	2–7–1	1–6	11th	
Vanderbilt:		29–22–2	17–15–1		
Temple Owls (Independent) (1940–1948)
1940	Temple	4–4–1			
1941	Temple	7–2			
1942	Temple	2–5–3			
1943	Temple	2–6			
1944	Temple	2–4–2			
1945	Temple	7–1			
1946	Temple	2–4–2			
1947	Temple	3–6			
1948	Temple	2–6–1			
Temple:		31–38–9			
Austin Kangaroos (Texas Conference) (1949–1952)
1949	Austin	5–5	3–2	T–2nd	
1950	Austin	2–7	0–5	6th	
1951	Austin	2–7	0–4	5th	
1952	Austin	2–7	1–3	T–3rd	
Austin:		11–26	4–14		
Total:		155–130–33			
National championship Conference title Conference division title or championship game berth

== See also ==
- List of college football head coaches with non-consecutive tenure

== Bibliography ==
- Traughber, Bill (2011). Vanderbilt Football: Tales of Commodore Gridiron History. The History Press. ISBN 978-1-60949-423-0.
- Vanderbilt University (1910). Vanderbilt University Quarterly. Vol. 10.
- Vanderbilt University (1911). Vanderbilt University Quarterly. Vol. 11.
