= 1912 College Baseball All-Southern Team =

All-star college baseball team

The 1912 College Baseball All-Southern Team consists of baseball players selected at their respective positions after the 1912 NCAA baseball season.

== All-Southerns ==
Position	Name	School
Pitcher	Tommy Thompson	Georgia
Pitcher	John D. Voss	Mercer
Pitcher	Greer	Alabama
Catcher	Timon Bowden	Georgia
First baseman	Davenport	Auburn
Second baseman	S. Holland	Georgia Tech
Third baseman	Harry Holland	Georgia Tech
Shortstop	Loyd	Vanderbilt
Outfielder	H. A. McDowell	Alabama
Outfielder	Bob McWhorter	Georgia
Outfielder	Lew Hardage	Vanderbilt
Utility	Jenks Gillem	Sewanee

All players were selected by John Heisman.
