= Goree (disambiguation) =

Gorée is an island in Senegal, Africa.

Goree may also refer to:

== People with the surname ==
- Cyesha Goree, American-Hungarian basketball player
- Eli Goree, Canadian actor
- Roy Goree, American football player
- T. J. Goree, Confederate lieutenant

== Other uses ==
- Goree (film), a 2019 Sinhala film
- Goree, Texas, a city in Knox County in the US State of Texas
- Goree Institute, a pan-African organisation on Gorée, Senegal

== See also ==
- Goeree-Overflakkee, Netherlands, from which the name of the Senegalese island was derived
