= Homer Grice =

College football player, English professor, preacher (1883–1974)

- Born: Homer Lamar Grice; April 12, 1883; Citra, Florida, U.S.
- Died: May 17, 1974 (aged 91); Nashville, Tennessee, U.S.
- Occupations: English professor; preacher
- Football career

Profile
- Position: Center

Career information
- College: Mercer (1909–1912)

Awards and highlights
- second-team All-Southern (1911)

Homer Lamar Grice (April 12, 1883 – May 17, 1974) was a college football player, English professor, Baptist preacher and first secretary of the Vacation Bible School Department at the Sunday Schoolboard, Nashville, a position held for nearly 30 years.

== Early life ==
Homer Grice was born on April 12, 1883, in Citra, Florida, to Albert Grice and Sarah Lee Bennett.

=== Mercer University ===
Grice was a prominent center for the Mercer Baptists football teams of Mercer University. Georgia Tech player and later Hall of Fame coach Bill Alexander called Grice "the meanest and toughest guy I ever ran across on a gridiron."

==== 1911 ====
He was selected second-team All-Southern in 1911, behind Vanderbilt's unanimous selection Hugh Morgan. Georgia tried to claim Grice was ineligible, to no avail.

== Educator ==
=== Ouachita Baptist College ===
Grice was a professor of English literature at Ouachita Baptist College.

=== Washington High School ===
Grice coached the football team of Washington High School in Washington, Georgia, in 1922 and 1923.
