= Ammie Sikes =

American football player (1892–1963)

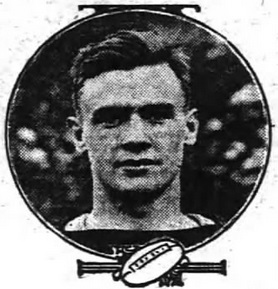
- Sikes c. 1912

Profile
- Position: Fullback

Personal information
- Born: July 26, 1892; Smyrna, Tennessee, U.S.
- Died: September 9, 1963 (aged 71); Nashville, Tennessee, U.S.
- Listed weight: 164 lb (74 kg)

Career information
- College: Vanderbilt (1911–1914)

Awards and highlights
- SIAA championship (1911, 1912); All-Southern (1912, 1913, 1914); Outing Roll of Honor (1914)

Ammie Thomas Sikes (July 26, 1892 – September 9, 1963) was an American college football player and physician. He played as a fullback at Vanderbilt University from 1911 to 1914.

== Early life ==
Sikes was born on July 26, 1892, in Smyrna, Tennessee, to Jessie Sikes and Jennie James.

== Vanderbilt University ==
=== Football ===
Sikes was a prominent fullback for Dan McGugin's Vanderbilt Commodores of Vanderbilt University from 1911 to 1914. He was thrice selected All-Southern.

==== 1911 ====
The 1911 Southern Intercollegiate Athletic Association (SIAA) championship team outscored opponents 259 to 9, suffering its only loss by a single point to Michigan. Edwin Pope's Football's Greatest Coaches reads "A lightning-swift backfield of Lew Hardage, Wilson Collins, Ammie Sikes, and Ray Morrison pushed Vandy through 1911 with only a 9-8 loss to Michigan." The Atlanta Constitution voted it the best backfield in the South.

==== 1912 ====
The 1912 team lost only to national champion Harvard and outscored opponents 393 to 19. The Commodores scored 100 points in both of its first two games.

==== 1913 ====
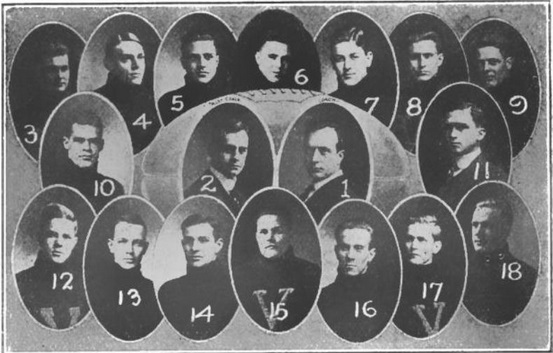
The 1914 Vanderbilt Commodores. Sikes is bottom right.

In 1913, Sikes took Lewie Hardage's old position at left halfback. On the 7 to 6 win over Tennessee in 1913, one account reads "'Red' Rainey shone for Tennessee, though he was later relegated to the side lines after a collision with one A. Sikes, Esq., otherwise known as the "Roaring Representative from Williamson."

==== 1914 ====
Sikes was captain of the 1914 team. He made Outings Roll of Honor.

== Coaching career ==
Sikes coached Montgomery Bell Academy in 1916 and to the state prep championship in 1917.

== Medical career and death ==
Sikes earned a Doctor of Medicine degree from Vanderbilt University School of Medicine in 1918 and served in the Medical Corps during World War I. He completed his internship and residency after the war at Bellevue Hospital in New York City. After a year with the Public Health Institute of Chicago, Sikes returned in 1922 to Nashville, where he practiced as a specialist in internal medicine. He died on September 9, 1963, at his Royal Oaks Apartments home in Nashville.
