= Roy Goree =

American football player

Profile
- Positions: End, Fullback

Career information
- High school: Boys
- College: Georgia Tech (1909–1912)

Awards and highlights
- All-Southern (1911); Tech Hall of Fame

C. P. "Roy" Goree was a college football player for the Georgia Tech Yellow Jackets. He made All-Southern in 1911. Both his sons also played for Tech. He is a member of Tech Hall of Fame.
