= Lewie Hardage =

American football player & coach (1891–1973)

- Hardage at Oklahoma

Biographical details
- Born: February 11, 1891; Madison, Alabama, U.S.
- Died: August 29, 1973 (aged 82); Melrose, Florida, U.S.

Playing career

Football
- 1908–1909: Auburn
- 1911–1912: Vanderbilt
- Position: Halfback

Coaching career (HC unless noted)

Football
- 1913: Mercer
- 1915–1917: McCallie School (TN)
- 1921: Gordon Military College
- 1922–1931: Vanderbilt (backfield)
- 1932–1934: Oklahoma
- 1935: Furman (backfield)
- 1936–1938: Florida (backfield)

Baseball
- 1937–1939: Florida

Head coaching record
- Overall: 13–17–5 (college football); 35–24–1 (college baseball)

Accomplishments and honors

Awards
- Third-team All-American (1912); 4× All-Southern (1908, 1909, 1911, 1912); 1912 All-time Vandy 2nd team One of coach Dan McGugin's six best players Morgan County Sports Hall of Fame

Lewis Woolford Hardage (February 11, 1891 – August 29, 1973) was an American college football player and college football and baseball coach.

Hardage was an All-Southern halfback every year he played: 1908, 1909, 1911, and 1912—the first two for Mike Donahue's Auburn Tigers of Auburn University and the latter two for Dan McGugin's Vanderbilt Commodores of Vanderbilt University. Sportswriter and historian Fuzzy Woodruff dubbed him "one of the most brilliant and famous ever to run across limed lines in the South" and the South's "fastest back of the 1910-1920 decade."

Hardage served as the head football coach at Mercer University in 1913 and the University of Oklahoma from 1932 to 1934, compiling a career college football head coaching record of 13–17–5. He was later the head baseball coach at the University of Florida from 1937 to 1939, tallying a mark of 35–24–1. Hardage also had stints at the head football coach at The McCallie School in Chattanooga, Tennessee, from 1915 to 1917 and Gordon Military College—now known as Gordon State College—in Barnesville, Georgia, in 1921. He spent ten seasons, from 1922 to 1931, as the backfield coach at his alma mater, Vanderbilt.

== Early years ==
Lewis Hardage was born on February 11, 1891, in Madison, Alabama, to Monroe L., a liquor dealer, and Katherine Hardage. His father Monroe operated the Hardage Brother's Saloon in Madison. By the time Lewis Hardage entered college, his family had moved to Decatur. He was inducted into the Morgan County Sports Hall of Fame in 2016.

== Playing career ==
Hardage was a prominent halfback at two different schools: Auburn University and Vanderbilt University, and was selected All-Southern every year in which he played.

=== Auburn ===
Hardage played two years for Mike Donahue's Auburn Tigers football team, from 1908 to 1909. He weighed some 165 pounds.

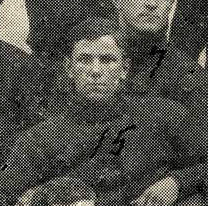
Hardage cropped from team photo at Auburn, 1908.

==== 1908 ====
The 1908 Auburn team disputes a Southern Intercollegiate Athletic Association (SIAA) championship with the LSU Tigers, despite losing to LSU 10–2 during the season, due to charges of professionalism against LSU. (Note: “We won every game that fall except LSU,” Auburn star Walker Reynolds told Clyde Bolton in 1973. “But LSU had a pro team.”) Amidst fears of many players being ineligible under SIAA rules most sportswriters did not include LSU for consideration as conference champions.

Hardage scored three touchdowns in the win over the Mercer Baptists.

Hardage provided the only score in a 6–0 win over the previously undefeated Sewanee Tigers at West End Park in Birmingham, a 45-yard punt return for a touchdown. It was dubbed by one source Auburn's "greatest victory in many years" and "most glorious victory in a decade". In celebration, students in night gowns marched all over town accompanied by cannon crackers.

Fuzzy Woodruff's account of the Sewanee game reads: "History was written when Auburn and Sewanee met in Birmingham...Auburn introduced a youthful half back, destined to become one of the most brilliant and famous ever to run across limed lines in the South. He was Lewis Hardage."

He scored two touchdowns in a 44–0 win over coach John Heisman's Georgia Tech Yellow Jackets, including a 108-yard kickoff return. Vanderbilt coach Dan McGugin selected Hardage for his All-Southern team.

==== 1909 ====
The 1909 team lost to Vanderbilt, and to conference champion Sewanee by a single point. Auburn scored against Sewanee when Lew Hardage put the ball in striking distance with a 30-yard run. Bradley Streit then went over for the touchdown. Nash Buckingham and Grantland Rice selected Hardage for their All-Southern team.

=== Vanderbilt ===
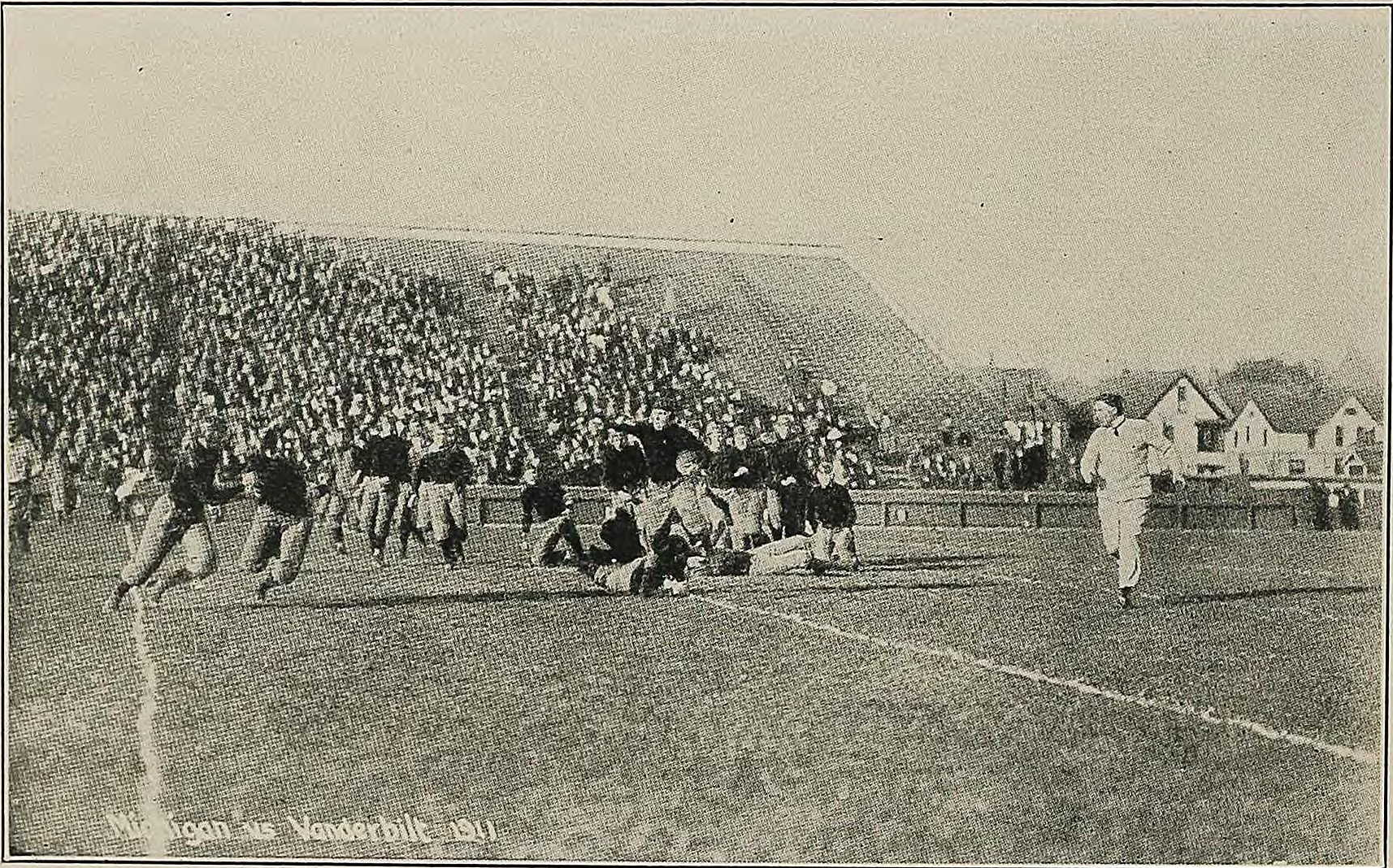
Circling left end against Michigan, 1911.

Hardage was then a two-year letterman for coach Dan McGugin's Vanderbilt Commodores football team (1911–1912).

==== 1911 ====
The 1911 Vanderbilt team were SIAA champions and lost one game by a single point to the only team able to score upon them, coach Fielding Yost's Michigan team. Edwin Pope's Football's Greatest Coaches reads "A lightning-swift backfield of Lew Hardage, Wilson Collins, Ammie Sikes, and Ray Morrison pushed Vandy through 1911 with only a 9-8 loss to Michigan." The Atlanta Constitution voted it the best backfield in the South.

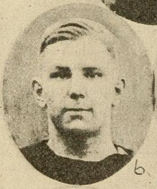
Hardage at Vanderbilt, 1912

Once against Mississippi, Hardage started around left end, then reversed right, and was again crowded out, reversing field back around left end. He seemed to break a tackle by every Mississippi player on his way to the end zone.

==== 1912 ====
In his senior year in 1912, Vanderbilt repeated as SIAA champion and Hardage was the captain of the team. He also was selected third-team All-American by Walter Camp, the fourth ever Southern player to get such a recognition. Innis Brown in 1912 wrote "Hardage has been rated as probably the most successful man in the south at making forward passes."

Hardage scored two touchdowns in the season's first game, the biggest win in Vanderbilt history, a 105–0 defeat of Bethel. (Note: Josh Cody was on Bethel's team.) Vanderbilt scored 100 points for the second straight week in a 100–3 win over Maryville, during which Hardage tossed a 40-yard touchdown pass. He returned an interception 35 yards for a touchdown against Rose Polytechnic. He was injured in the season's only loss, to national champion Harvard. Despite his hurt left ankle, Hardage "ran with great brilliance" in his final game, a 16–0 defeat of Sewanee to secure a southern title.

== Coaching career ==
After graduating from Vanderbilt, Hardage took several coaching jobs. His first position was as head coach of the Mercer Baptists in 1913, having a rough season at 2–5–1. He was later head coach at The McCallie School, a boys’ college-preparatory school in Chattanooga, Tennessee, from 1915 to 1917, where he had a coaching record of 11–4–3. Future journalist Ralph McGill was a tackle and captain on the team.

As a lieutenant, Hardage played for Barron Aviation Field during World War I. In 1921, Hardage took the job of the athletic director at Gordon Military College.

=== Vanderbilt ===
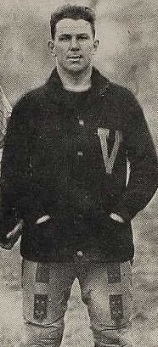
Hardage as Vanderbilt backfield coach

From 1922 to 1931, Hardage returned to his alma mater, Vanderbilt, as the backfield coach for the football team. In his first season as backfield coach for Vanderbilt, the line coach was Wallace Wade, and Vanderbilt repeated as Southern champions. Hardage focused particularly on halfback Gil Reese upon his arrival, and later coached Hall of Fame quarterback Bill Spears. He filled assistant Josh Cody's role when Cody left to coach Clemson.

=== Oklahoma ===
In 1932, Hardage was hired as the head football coach at Oklahoma, where he coached for three seasons before resigning. McGugin got him the Oklahoma job. Bo Rowland was Hardage's line coach at Oklahoma.

=== Florida ===
Hardage spent the 1935 season as an assistant football coach at Furman University before moving on to Florida where he became the backfield coach for coach Josh Cody's football team and the head coach of the baseball team. He thus coached Florida's lone All-SEC selection during this period: Walter Mayberry.

== Head coaching record ==
=== College football ===
Year	Team	Overall	Conference	Standing
Mercer Baptists (Southern Intercollegiate Athletic Association) (1913)
1913	Mercer	2–5–1	0–4–1	T–16th
Mercer:		2–5–1	0–4–1	
Oklahoma Sooners (Big Six Conference) (1932–1934)
1932	Oklahoma	4–4–1	3–2	T–2nd
1933	Oklahoma	4–4–1	3–2	3rd
1934	Oklahoma	3–4–2	2–2–1	3rd
Oklahoma:		11–12–4	8–6–1	
Total:		13–17–5		

=== College baseball ===
Record table
Season	Team	Overall	Conference	Standing	Postseason
Florida Gators (Southeastern Conference) (1937–1939)
1937	Florida	10–7–1	3–3	T–4th	
1938	Florida	14–9	4–2	2nd	
1939	Florida	11–8	4–2	3rd	
Florida:		35–24–1 (.592)	11–7 (.611)		
Total:		35–24–1 (.592)			

== Sources ==
- Woodruff, Fuzzy (1928). A History of Southern Football 1890–1928. Vol. 1.
- Woodruff, Fuzzy (1928). A History of Southern Football 1890–1928. Vol. 2.
