= 1912 NCAA baseball season =

American college baseball season

Seasons
- ← 1911 1913 →

The 1912 NCAA baseball season, play of college baseball in the United States organized by the National Collegiate Athletic Association (NCAA) began in the spring of 1912. Play largely consisted of regional matchups, some organized by conferences, and ended in June. No national championship event was held until 1947.

== New programs ==
- Florida recorded its first official season in 1912, although evidence for a team in at least one prior year also exists.

== Conference winners ==
This is a partial list of conference champions from the 1912 season.

Conference	Regular season winner
Big Nine	Wisconsin
Missouri Valley	Missouri
SIAA	Vanderbilt
