= McTyeire College =

Coordinates: 36.158°N 88.514°W

McTyeire College was a Methodist college in McKenzie, Tennessee founded in 1858 and chartered in 1860.

== History ==
The college originally opened in the community of Caledonia in Henry County, Tennessee as Caledonia College. Caledonia closed when students left to fight in the American Civil War, and the school building burned down during the war. The college reopened in McKenzie and was rechartered in 1871 as McKenzie College. The school was renamed McTyeire Institute in 1882 under the direction of the Methodist Church. The school closed in 1931.
