= Wilson Collins =

American baseball player (1889–1941)

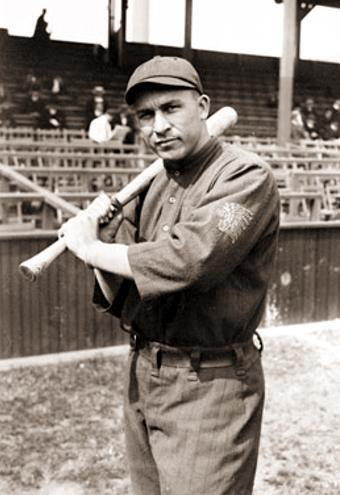
- Outfielder
- Born: May 7, 1889; Pulaski, Tennessee, U.S.
- Died: February 28, 1941 (aged 51); Knoxville, Tennessee, U.S.
- Batted: Right Threw: Right

MLB debut
- May 12, 1913, for the Boston Braves

Last MLB appearance
- July 8, 1914, for the Boston Braves

MLB statistics
- Batting average: .263
- Runs batted in: 1
- Fielding percentage: .926
- Putouts: 25
- Stats at Baseball Reference

Teams
- Boston Braves (1913–1914)

Cyril Wilson Collins (May 7, 1889 – February 28, 1941) was an American backup outfielder in Major League Baseball, playing mainly at left field for the Boston Braves in the 1913 and 1914 seasons. Listed at 5 ft 9.5 in (1.77 m), 165 lb., Collins batted and threw right-handed.

A native of Pulaski, Tennessee, he attended Vanderbilt University. He was a member of both the football and baseball teams there. Edwin Pope's Football's Greatest Coaches reads "A lightning-swift backfield of Lew Hardage, Wilson Collins, Ammie Sikes, and Ray Morrison pushed Vandy through 1911 with only a 9-8 loss to Michigan." The Atlanta Constitution voted it the best backfield in the South.

During the First World War, Collins was the fullback for the 1917 Camp Gordon football team.

In a two-season career, Collins was a .263 hitter (10-for-38) with five runs and one RBI in 43 games. He did not hit have any extra-base hits. In 28 outfield appearances, he committed two errors in 27 chances for a collective .926 fielding percentage.

Collins died in Knoxville, Tennessee, at the age of 51.
