= Offensive backfield =

Area of an American football field

The offensive backfield is the area of an American football field behind the line of scrimmage, and players positioned there on offense who begin plays behind the line, typically including the quarterback and running backs (halfbacks and fullback).

== History ==
The modernization of the roles of lineman and backs is often traced to Amos Alonzo Stagg. Some of the greatest backfields in the history of college football include those of the 1912 Carlisle Indians, 1917 Georgia Tech Golden Tornado, 1924 Notre Dame Fighting Irish, and 1945 Army Cadets. Joe Guyon was a member of both the aforementioned Carlisle and Georgia Tech teams.

Typically, quarterbacks or halfbacks passed the ball, and fullbacks handled kicking duties.

== Play in the backfield ==
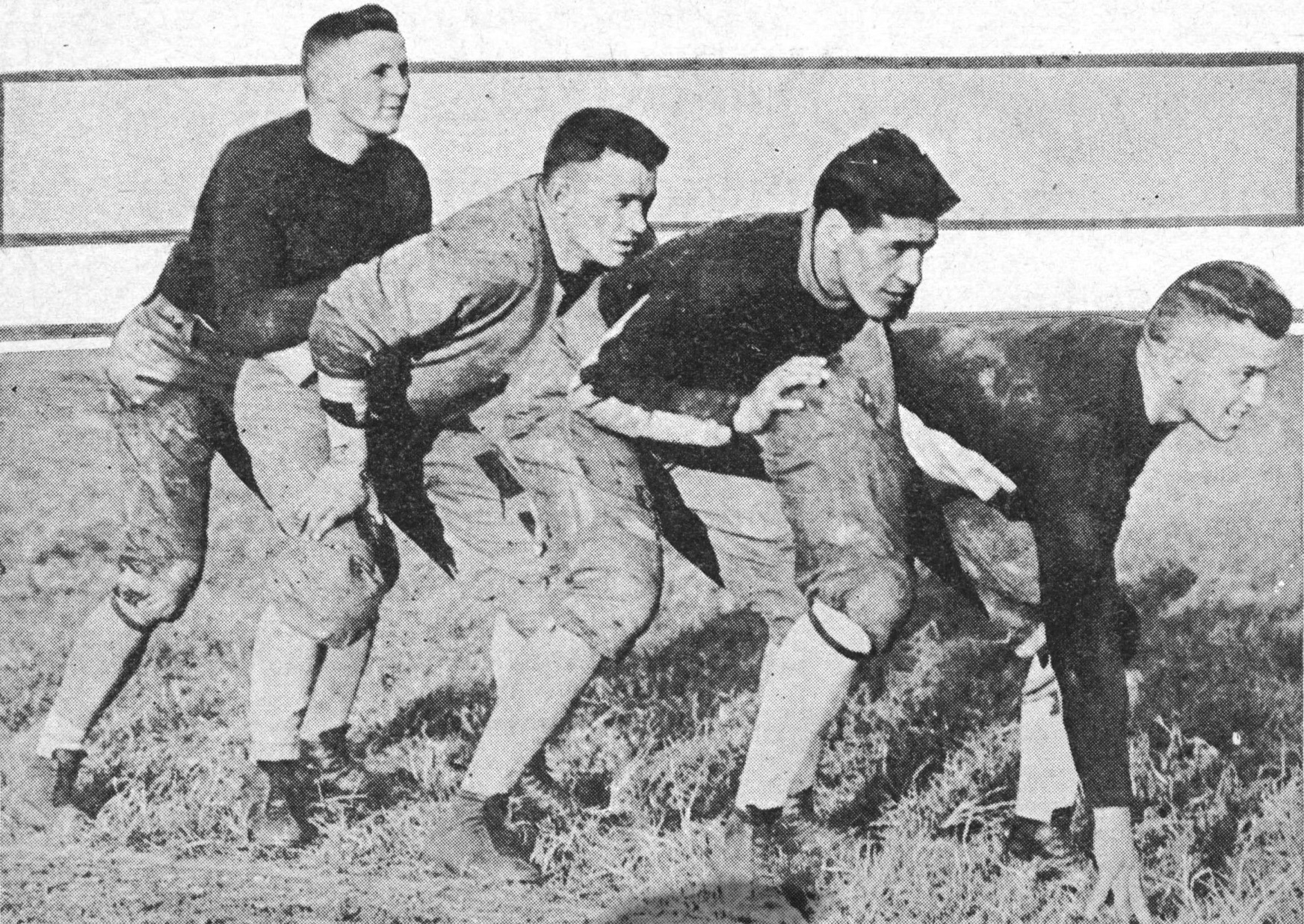
1917 Georgia Tech backfield

Players who are positioned behind the line of scrimmage, on the offensive side, are denominated as "offensive backfield." Those players are usually ball receivers, so they have the word "back" appended to their position: i.e., running back, full back, half back and quarterback. However, because the word "backfield" is a place, sometimes receivers can be appended to the grouping.

Most running plays begin with a hand-off in the offensive backfield. All kicks and punts must take place in the offensive backfield. If the offensive ball-carrier is tackled in the backfield, the team will lose yards, in that the distance they need to attain for a first down is more than at the beginning of the play. Each play, the quarterback will start in the offensive backfield, being snapped the ball from the center, and moving the ball upfield.

== Rules ==
There are specific rules governing conduct in the offensive backfield. There are many rules which differ for play in the offensive backfield as opposed to play in front of the line of scrimmage. The 1906 football rule reforms mandated that the offensive team line up with at least seven players on the line of scrimmage, which are now commonly called "linemen". Therefore, a maximum of four players are allowed in the offensive backfield. The other players not on the line of scrimmage may be positioned anywhere, but all must be at least 1 yard behind the seven or more players on the line of scrimmage. A forward pass can only be legally made from the offensive backfield. There are also rules. If the pass is not deemed a forward pass, and is not caught the ball is still considered live and can be picked up by either team. Over time, these rules have been changed to account for the evolving nature of the game. The tuck rule was an especially controversial rule that stated any forward motion of the quarterback's arm results in an attempted forward pass. Thus, if the ball were to drop to the ground, it would be ruled an incompletion instead of fumble.

The quarterback can run as far back as he wants with the ball, but if he is still inside the "tacklebox" (the area between where the tackles line up) and does not throw the ball past the line of scrimmage, he will be called with intentional grounding which results in a 10-yard penalty and a loss of the down. There is no intentional grounding for the ball not crossing the line of scrimmage if the quarterback was outside of the tackle box when the ball was thrown.
