= Edwin Pope =

American journalist (1928–2017)

- Born: April 11, 1928; Athens, Georgia, U.S.
- Died: January 19, 2017 (aged 88); Okeechobee, Florida, U.S.
- Education: University of Georgia
- Occupation: Sportswriter
- Spouse: Eileen Pope
- Children: David Pope

John Edwin Pope (April 11, 1928 – January 19, 2017) was an American journalist known for his sportswriting at the Miami Herald, where his work appeared from 1956 until his death in 2017. He covered Super Bowl I through Super Bowl XLVII. Some referred to him as "the best writer of sports in America."

== Early career ==
Pope's journalistic career began at the early age of eleven, when he began covering small events for his hometown Athens Banner-Herald. By the time he was fifteen he had been promoted to the sports editor of the paper, thus making him the youngest person in the country to hold that position. His college years were spent at the University of Georgia, and after graduating he worked briefly with the United Press International, Atlanta Journal and Atlanta Constitution.

== Miami Herald ==
Pope's success with his 1954 book Football's Greatest Coaches allowed him to leave the Atlanta area and move down to Miami, where he accepted a lucrative position at the Miami Herald in 1956. Brought on as a columnist and assistant editor, he was made Sports Editor within the year when the previous Editor chose to retire. In his 50-plus years he covered the growth of Miami as a sports city, from a tourist destination with no professional teams, to a World City with franchises in all four major sports, and major events in golf, tennis, and auto racing.

While he retired as the Herald sports editor in 2003, he contributed columns to the newspaper until 2016, when he wrote his last piece eulogizing boxer and former Miami resident Muhammad Ali.

From 2012 Pope lived in Okeechobee, Florida.

== Awards ==
- Red Smith Award (1989)
- Bert McGrane Award (2000)
- Member National Sportscasters and Sportswriters Hall of Fame
- Member Florida Sports Hall of Fame
- Member College Football Hall of Fame
- Member Pro Football Hall of Fame
- Four National Headliners Club awards as the nation's best columnist
- Three Eclipse Awards for thoroughbred racing columns

== Books ==
- Football's Greatest Coaches (1955)
- The Edwin Pope Collection (Contemporary American Sportswriters) (1988)
- Baseball’s Greatest Managers (1960)
