= 1921 Vanderbilt Commodores baseball team =

American college baseball season

1921 Vanderbilt Commodores baseball
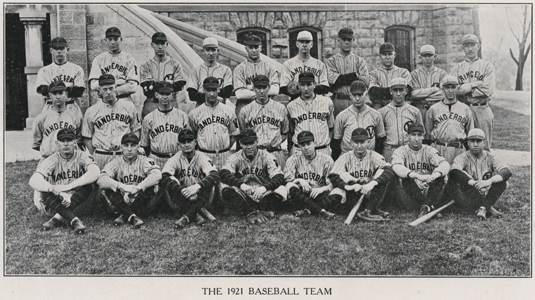

SIAA Champions
- Conference: Southern Intercollegiate Athletic Association
- Record: 20–5 (14–4 SIAA)
- Head coach: Byrd Douglas
- Captain: Julian Thomas
- Home stadium: Curry Field

The 1921 Vanderbilt Commodores baseball team represented the Vanderbilt Commodores of Vanderbilt University in the 1921 NCAA baseball season, winning the SIAA championship. By May 29, the team had hit over .225 for the season, garnering 27 home runs, 17 triples, 26 doubles, 107 singles, and a total of 138 hits for 326 bases with 54 stolen bases.

The Commodores were coached by Byrd Douglas, Vanderbilt alumnus, once a star catcher of the Princeton baseball team. The yearbook claimed the season's success was "due almost entirely to one man", namely Douglas.

The 1921 Vanderbilt Commodores football team also won an SIAA title. Frank Godchaux, Doc Kuhn, Tot McCullough, Jess Neely, and Tom Ryan were also members of the football team.

== Regular season ==
Vanderbilt's yearbook The Commodore states that in a 1921 game against Southwestern Presbyterian University, the team achieved a world record in scoring 13 runs in one inning, after two men were out. The Tennessean recalls the event: "Neely singled as did Kuhn; Neil fanned but Thomas got his third straight hit and both tallied. Big Tot got hit by a pitched ball and Smith was safe on a fielder's choice with one out. Woodruf flied out to right. Tyner slammed one to center which Jetty juggled and everybody advanced a pair of sacks. Ryan was safe on another error and two runs came over. Neely beat out his second hit of the inning and Kuhn walked. Neil walked. Thomas was safe on an error and Big Tot McCullough picked one over the right field fence, clearing the sacks--but oh, what's the use? Why continue?" Joe Smith hit a grand slam as well, and Manning Brown got a homer.

In the game against Camp Benning (GA), Neill netted a home run with a fly ball to left field, which bounced off the outfielder's knee for a home run.

The Kentucky game on May 17 and the Princeton game both went into extra innings.

From June 6 to June 15 the Commodores had an Eastern trip carrying them through Kentucky, West Virginia, Delaware, Pennsylvania, New Jersey, and New York. Kuhn starred in the 3 to 2 loss to Princeton.

== Schedule and results ==
Legend
	Vanderbilt win
	Vanderbilt loss
**Bold**	Vanderbilt team member

1921 Vanderbilt Commodores baseball game log

Exhibition Games
Date	Opponent	Site/stadium	Score	Win	Loss	Save	Attendance	Overall record	SIAA record
	Nashville Vols	Nashville, TN	**L** 3–7					0–0	
March 25	Nashville Vols	Nashville, TN	**L** 4–11					0–0	
April 1	Boston Red Sox	Curry Field • Nashville, TN	**L** 1–9					0–0	

Regular season
Date	Opponent	Site/stadium	Score	Win	Loss	Save	Attendance	Overall record	SIAA record
April 2	Indiana	Dudley Field (Nashville, TN)	**W** 2–0	**Slim Embry**	Walker			1–0	0–0
	Mississippi		**W** 2–0					2–0	1–0
April 11	Southwestern Presbyterian	Curry Field • Nashville, TN	**W** 19–2					3–0	1–0
	Southwestern Presbyterian	Curry Field • Nashville, TN	**W** 13–4					4–0	1–0
April 18	Tennessee	Curry Field • Nashville, TN	**L** 2–11	Lefty Bishop	**Tom Ryan**			4–1	1–1
April 19	Tennessee	Curry Field • Nashville, TN	**W** 4–3	**Slim Embry**	Ben Cantwell			5–1	2–1
April 20	Tennessee	Curry Field • Nashville, TN	**W** 3–2		Lefty Bishop			6–1	3–1
April 21	Mercer	Curry Field • Nashville, TN	**W** 5–3	**Boots Richardson**	Bob Sawin			7–1	4–1
April 23	Mercer	Curry Field • Nashville, TN	**L** 2–5	Tige Stone	**Slim Embry**			7–2	4–2
April 27	Georgia	Curry Field • Nashville, TN	**W** 7–4	**Tot McCullough**				8–2	5–2
April 28	Georgia	Curry Field • Nashville, TN	**W** 6–2	**Slim Embry**	Cliff Pantone			9–2	6–2
April 29	at Tennessee	Waite Field • Knoxville, TN	**W** 6–2	**Slim Embry**	Lefty Bishop			10–2	7–2
April 30	at Tennessee	Waite Field • Knoxville, TN	**L** 2–7	Ben Cantwell	**Tom Ryan**			10–3	7–3
May 4	at Kentucky	Stoll Field • Lexington, KY	**W** 9–4	**Slim Embry**	Cooper			11–3	8–3
May 7	Howard	Curry Field • Nashville, TN	**W** 16–1					12–3	9–3
	Howard	Curry Field • Nashville, TN	**W** 13–1					13–3	10–3
May 13	Centre	Curry Field • Nashville, TN	**W** 7–0					14–3	11–3
May 14	Centre	Curry Field • Nashville, TN	**W** 12–8					15–3	12–3
May 16	Kentucky	Curry Field • Nashville, TN	**W** 18–3					16–3	13–3
May 17	Kentucky	Curry Field • Nashville, TN	**W** 6–5					17–3	14–3
May 19	Camp Benning (GA)	Curry Field • Nashville, TN	**W** 5–3	**Slim Embry**	"Dirty" Jones			18–3	14–3
June 7	at Centre	Cheek Field • Danville, KY	**L** 3–7	Tommy Moran	**Slim Embry**			18–4	14–4
June 11	at Princeton	University Field • Princeton, NJ	**L** 2–3	Thomas	**Slim Embry**			18–5	14–4
	at Washington & Lee	Lexington, VA	**W** 2–1					19–5	14–4
June 14	at Washington & Lee	Lexington, VA	**W** 13–4	**Tot McCullough**				**W** 20–5	14–4

== Roster ==
=== Coaches ===
Name	Position
Byrd Douglas	Head coach
Strat Foster	Manager

=== Players ===
Name	Position
A. Bell	2B
Bell	3B
B. Brown	OF
Manning Brown	OF
Buckner	C
Coston	RHP
Slim Embry	RHP
Frank Godchaux	C
Joe Hatcher	C
Hawkins	C
Hi Hightower	C
Huckaby	OF
Doc Kuhn	SS
Lewis	2B
Bunny Luton	OF
Tot McCullough	1B/OF/LHP
McDonald	OF
McDonnell	SS
McGinnis	OF
Bob McNeilly	RHP
Jess Neely	OF
Scotty Neill	SS/2B/INF
Boots Richardson	LHP
Riley	RHP
Rudolph	RHP
Tom Ryan	RHP
Sherrod	RHP
Joe Smith	OF
Paul Stumb	RHP
Julian Thomas	1B
Mims Tyner	C
Williams	OF
Fish Wilson	2B/INF
Wooden	3B
Tobe Woodruf	3B

== Statistical leaders ==
Wins	
Slim Embry	9
Boots Richardson	5
Tot McCullough	4

Home Runs	
Scotty Neill	13

== Postseason awards and honors ==
Shortstop Doc Kuhn and outfielders Manning Brown and Tot McCullough made All-Southern.
