= List of Vanderbilt Commodores starting quarterbacks =

College football list

This is a list of every Vanderbilt Commodores football team quarterback and the years they participated on the Vanderbilt Commodores football team. Vanderbilt quarterbacks have led Vanderbilt to 624 wins, 8 bowl games, and 4 bowl victories. Clyde Berryman selected Vanderbilt for two National Championships.

Five Vanderbilt quarterbacks have been taken in the National Football League draft since 1936. Including the NFL, Vanderbilt quarterbacks have also played professionally in the Arena Football League and United States Football League. 7 Vanderbilt quarterbacks went on to be head coaches in Division I-A or professional football. 2 Vanderbilt quarterbacks are members of the College Football Hall of Fame.

Vanderbilt quarterbacks have played prominent roles in American society off the gridiron as well. Irby Curry, the starting quarterback for the "point-a-minute" 1915 Vanderbilt Commodores football team, served in World War I after graduating in 1916, dying in aerial combat in France. Rand Dixon was a decorated World War II veteran.

== Main starting quarterbacks ==
=== 1890 to 1894 ===
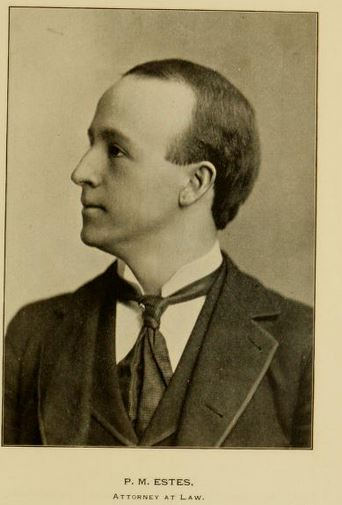
Pat Estes

The following players were the predominant quarters for the Commodores each season the team was a non-conference independent team, following the birth of Vanderbilt football.

Name	Years Started	Notability	References
Pat Estes	1890	The quarterback of Vanderbilt's first game against Nashville (Peabody). He was later a law partner of state legislator Thomas James Tyne.	
Charles F. MacKenzie	1891	First quarterback to play rival Sewanee.	
William E. Beard	1892	Said to be the first to dub Vanderbilt the Commodores in the Nashville Banner. First Vandy quarterback to play Tennessee.	
T. H. Malone, Jr.	1893	Son of Thomas H. Malone.	
W. J. Keller	1894	He also coached the Vandy team in '93, and had before played for Amos Alonzo Stagg.	

=== 1895 to 1918 ===
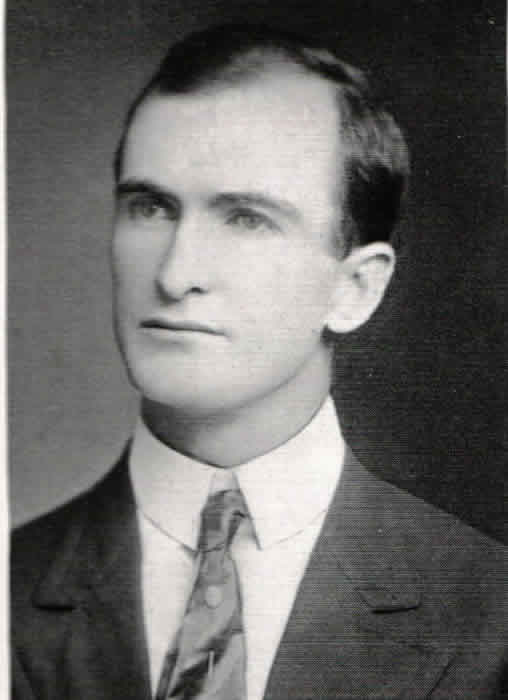
Sam Costen

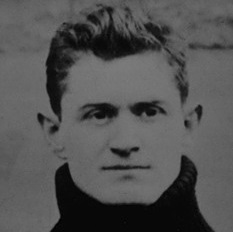
Ray Morrison

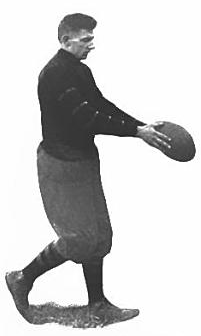
Zach Curlin

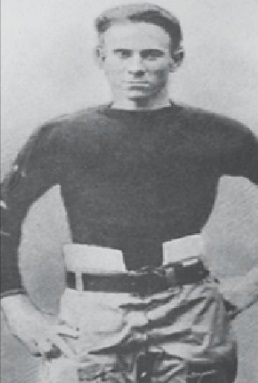
Irby Curry

The following quarterbacks were the predominant quarters for the Commodores each season after the establishment of the Southern Intercollegiate Athletic Association until the end of the war.

Name	Years Started	Notability	References
Myles P. O'Connor	1895–1896	He won Bachelor of Ugliness, the most coveted award for a male Vanderbilt undergraduate.	
Joe Goodson	1897–1898	Led team to its first conference title as Southern Intercollegiate Athletic Association champion.	
Frank Godchaux, Sr.	1899–1900	Transfer from LSU. Father of Frank Godchaux Jr.	
Fred Hume	1901	He weighed just 122 pounds.	
Frank Kyle	1902–1905	First starting quarterback under coach Dan McGugin. 1912 All-time Vandy 2nd team. One time coach at Ole Miss.	
Sam Costen	1906–1907	All-Southern (1906) One time coach at The Citadel.	
Ray Morrison	1908–1911	Considered one of the best quarterbacks in Vanderbilt's long history; he was the starter for the scoreless tie with defending national champion Yale at Yale Field. All-Southern (1910, 1911); All-American (1911). Inducted into the College Football Hall of Fame as a coach. 1912 All-time Vandy 1st team. Associated Press Southeast Area All-Time football team 1869–1919 era. One of six players McGugin ranked as his best. 1934 All-time Vandy team. He was the head coach of Vanderbilt after McGugin, as well as during 1918.	
Zach Curlin	1912–1913	Long time Memphis Tigers coach. Made drop kicks against Harvard and Michigan.	
Hord Boensch	1913	All-Southern (1913). Kicked the field goal to beat Tennessee 7 to 6 in 1913.	
Irby Curry	1914–1916	Known as "Rabbit". All-Southern (1915, 1916) and third-team All-American. Led the SIAA Champion "point a minute" team of 1915. A beloved player described as the one "who has most appealed to the imagination, admiration, and affection of the entire university community through the years." Curry was killed in aerial combat over France in the First World War. Tennessee Sports Hall of Fame. Namesake of Curry Field. Coach McGugin until his dying day had three pictures in his office, of Lincoln, General Lee, and Curry.	
Sam Wilhite	1917		
Dooch Sherman	1918	Won the Porter Cup	

=== 1919 to 1932 ===
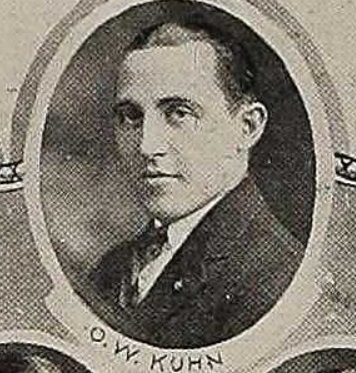
Doc Kuhn

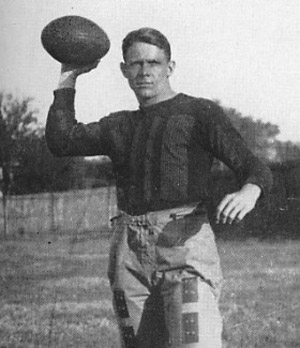
Bill Spears

The following quarterbacks were the predominant quarters for the Commodores each season after the First World War and before the founding of the SEC in 1932. In 1922 the team joined the Southern Conference.

Name	Years Started	Notability	References
Swayne Latham	1919–1920	All-Southern (1919).	
Frank Godchaux Jr.	1921	The first son to follow in his father's footsteps as a Vanderbilt football player. Godchaux was the second leading scorer on the SIAA champion team, behind only Rupert Smith.	
Doc Kuhn	1921–1923	He was captain of the 1923 football team and '22-'23 basketball team. Kuhn was quarterback for teams which won three straight conference titles, including the school's most recent. He was the starter for the scoreless tie with the Michigan Wolverines at the dedication of Dudley Field in 1922. Made Walter Camp's Honorable Mention in 1922, and Billy Evans's All-American. He was the recipient of the Porter Cup in 1923.	
E. M. Waller	1924	Coached at Middle Tennessee State University when it was first dubbed the "Middle Tennessee State Blue Raiders". Known as "Nig" due to his dark complexion.	
Neil Cargile	1924–1925	Starter for 1924 defeat of Minnesota, Vandy's first victory over a Western school.	
Bill Spears	1925–1927	All-Southern (1926, 1927). All-American (1926, 1927). One of six players Dan McGugin ranked as his best he ever coached. College Football Hall of Fame (1962). Partly responsible for halfback James Armistead leading the nation in scoring in 1927. Spears was fast and rarely threw an interception.	
Jimmy Armistead	1928	He took over the duties once Spears graduated. Formerly a running back, he led the nation in scoring in 1927.	
Benny Parker	1929–1930	Flipped three touchdowns in the 33 to 7 win over Minnesota in 1930.	
Tommy Henderson	1930–1932	He always played without a helmet.	

=== 1933 to 1955 ===
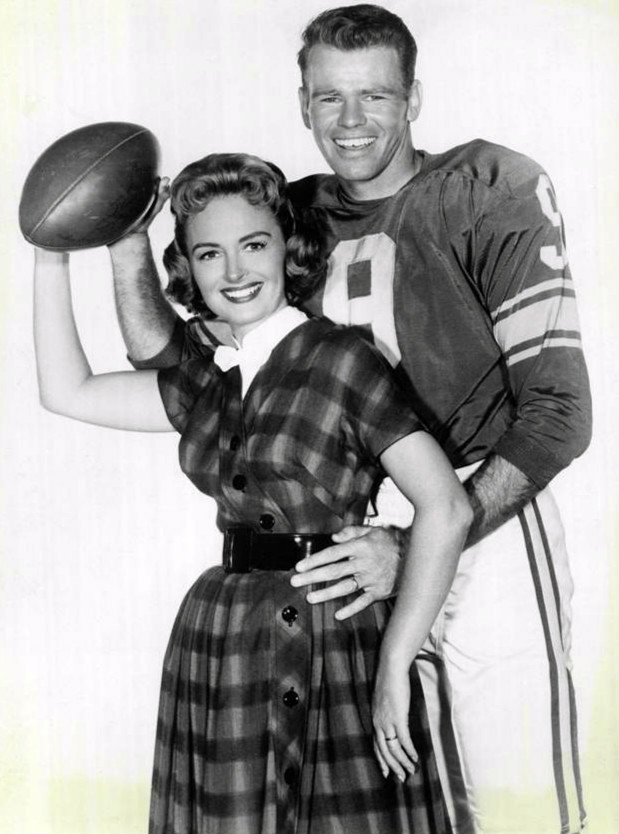
Bill Wade with Donna Reed, 1959.

The following players were the predominant quarters for the Commodores each season the team was a member of the Southeastern Conference, until its first bowl victory in the 1955 Gator Bowl.

Name	Years Started	Notability	References
Rand Dixon	1933–1935	Broke off an 80-yard run against Cincinnati in 1934. Decorated World War II veteran. Florida Gators assistant.	
Jimmy Huggins	1936–1937	Known as "Lunny", was 5'6" and 145 pounds. Led the team over LSU in 1937.	
Bert Marshall	1937–1938		
Junius Plunkett	1939		
Charlton Davis	1940		
Jack Jenkins	1941–1942	National Football League player. Drafted 10th overall in the 1943 NFL draft.	
Jack Kaley	1943		
Lee Austin	1944		
John Rich	1945	He came to Vanderbilt on a football scholarship. He started the first Vanderbilt game he ever saw as a blocking back in its single wing offense. Successful businessman as founder of Delta Coals, Incorporated. Vandy Athletics Hall of Fame.	
Jamie Wade	1946–1947, 1949		
Bobby Berry	1948		
Bill Wade	1950–1951	1st Overall pick of the 1952 NFL draft. SEC's Most Valuable Player (1951). 2nd-team All-American. He threw for 1,609 yards and 13 touchdowns in 1951. Twice All-Pro and twice a Pro Bowl selection. NFL champion (1963). Vandy Athletics Hall of Fame. SEC Football Legend (1994).	
Bill Krietemeyer	1952		
Jim Looney	1953–1954		
Don Orr	1955	Led Vandy to its first bowl victory in the '55 Gator Bowl, coached by Arthur Guepe. Orr was a long time NFL official.	

=== 1956 to present ===
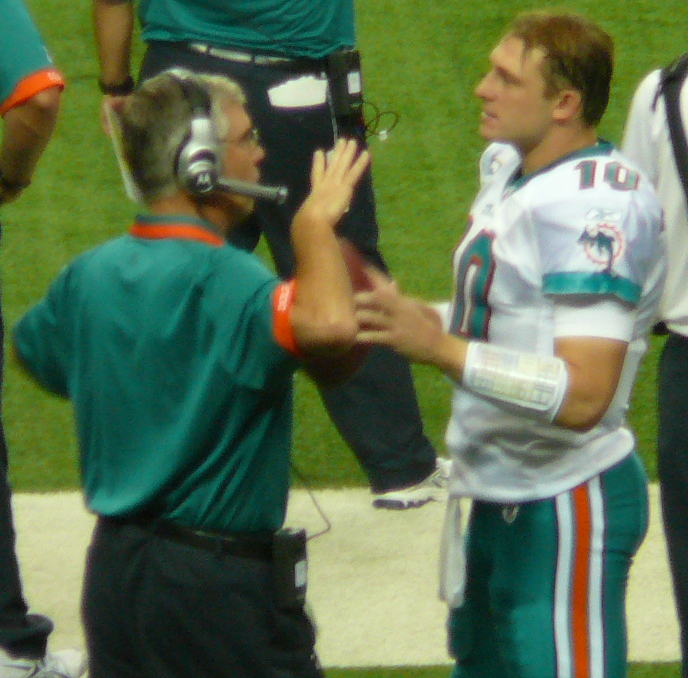
David Lee with Chad Pennington, 2009.

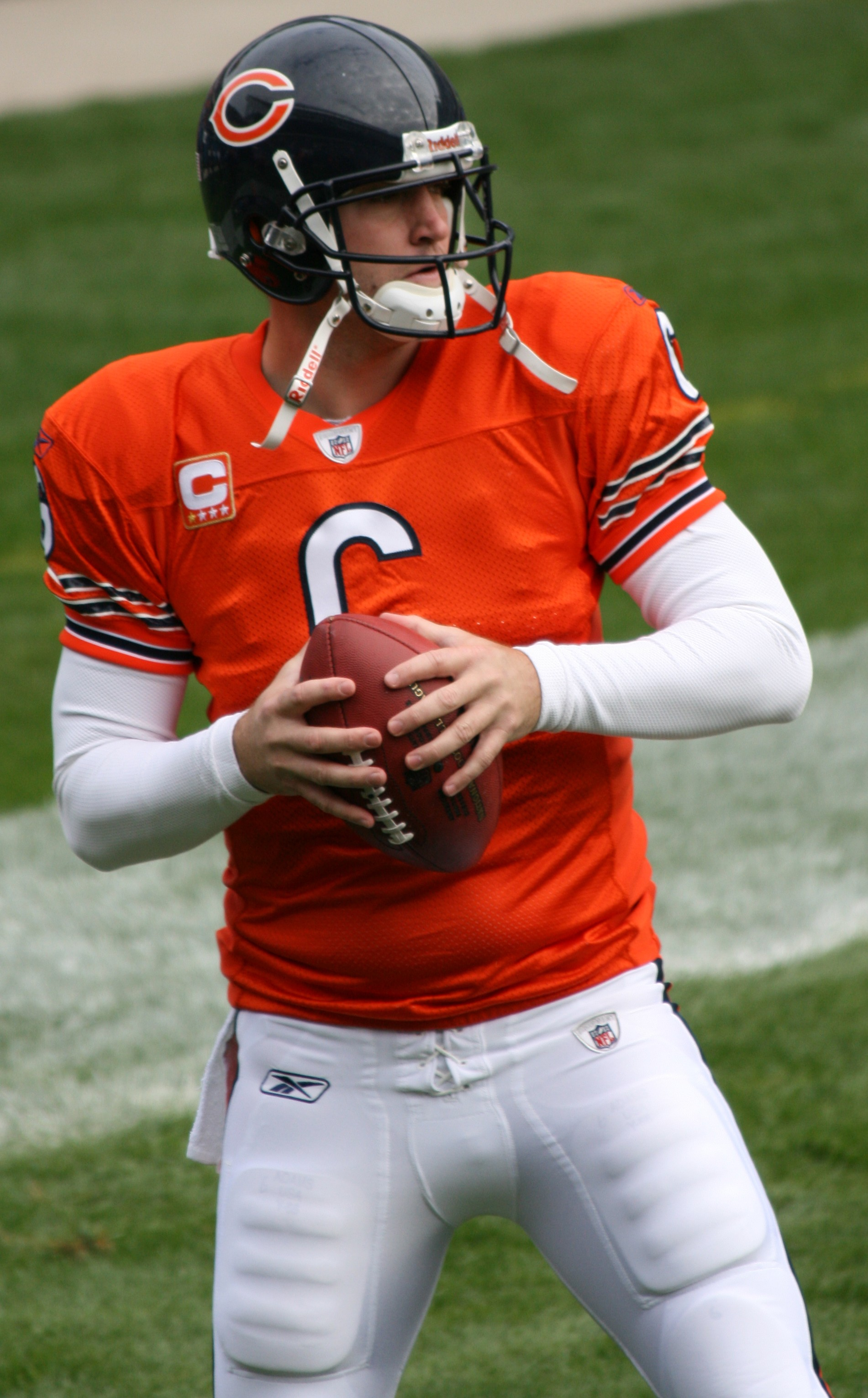
Jay Cutler

The following players were the predominant quarterbacks for the Commodores each season after the team's first bowl victory in the 1955 Gator Bowl.

Name	Years Started	Notability	References
Boyce Smith	1956–1958		
Russ Morris	1959		
Hank Lesesne	1960–1962		
Jon Cleveland	1963		
David Waller	1964		
Bob Kerr	1965		
Gary Davis	1966	Drafted by Cincinnati Bengals in 1968 with the 1st pick in the 3rd round.	
Roger May	1967		
John Miller	1968		
Watson Brown	1969	He led the winning touchdown drive in 1969 against 13th ranked Alabama in Nashville. Tennessee Sports Hall of Fame. Older brother of Mack Brown. Watson later coached the Commodores from 1986-90.	
Denny Painter	1969–1970		
Steve Burger	1971		
Steve Lainhart	1972		
Fred Fisher	1973–1975		
David Lee	1974	Led Vanderbilt to a 7–4 record and its first bowl in 19 years, tied Texas Tech 6–6. Team's most valuable player (1974). Lee has been a coach since 1975 in the NCAA and NFL. He was head coach at Texas–El Paso (1989–1993). He has been an assistant coach most of career primarily as a Quarterbacks coach.	
Randy Hampton	1976	Hampton was 53 of 107 for 805 yards 3 TDs and 5 INTs. Winning two games.	
Mike Wright	1977	Drafted by Cincinnati Bengals in 1980 with the 3rd pick in the 12th round. In 1977 Write led the SEC in Total Plays (370), Passing Efficiency Rating (106.5), Passing Yards Per Attempt (6.6), Pass Completions (106), Pass Completion Percentage (50,2), passing yards (1383).	
Van Heflin	1978–1979	Vanderbilt had never had an African American quarterback who started consistently until Heflin, David Culley, an African American quarterback from Sparta, actually started against Rice in a game in 1975 when the regular starter, Fred Fisher, was injured. Heflin was the first to earn the starting assignment at the beginning of a season and hold onto it through the year.	
Whit Taylor	1980–1982	Single-game passing record of 464 yards against Tennessee. Third in career total yardage at Vanderbilt (6,727). First Team All-SEC (1982). That year, he threw for 2,481 yards with 22 touchdowns. His 1982 team was the last winning season Vanderbilt would have until 2008. With wins over #14 Florida as well as UT. As well as leading them to the last bowl game of the 20th century for Vanderbilt. Taylor was an ArenaBowl 1 Champion (1987). Taylor was selected as a SEC Football Legend (2003).	
Kurt Page	1983–1984	In 1983, Page led the SEC as well as the NCAA in passing stats, Total Plays (553), pass completions (286), pass attempts (493), #4 NCAA and #1 SEC in passing yards (3718). Page, 1984 team started out with a four-game winning streak topped off with a win over Alabama 30–21 and being ranked (19) and only 1–6 to end the season.	
John Gromos	1985; 1989	Drafted by Seattle Seahawks in 1990 with the 8th pick in the 12th round. He was a color commentator for Vanderbilt football radio broadcasts for 19 years. Starting in 2015 Gromos became the top regional executive for Turner Construction Co.	
Mark Wracher	1986	Wracher led Vanderbilt to one win.	
Eric Jones	1987–1988	In 1987, Jones led the SEC in passing efficiency and total offense. Vanderbilt had a Heisman Trophy campaign for Jones in 1988, with a slogan "It's Showtime!". Jones had better numbers than in 1988, they were not enough to make up for the team's 3–8 record when it came to the Heisman Trophy voting.	
Mike Healey	1990-1991	Played in 29 games, 1,967 yards on 266 att 139 comp 13 TDs and 8 Ints.	
Marcus Wilson	1991–1992	Wilson was a duel threat QB three years he rushed for 446, 496, and 488 and 24 rushing TDs. He passed for 1030 yards as a SR. Wilson won two games for Vanderbilt 54–10 over Ohio for the only win in 1989, and the only win in 1990 over LSU 24–21. Wilsons 1990 team won five games, SMU 14–11, #17 Georgia 27–25, Ole Miss 30–27, Army 41–10, and Kentucky 17–7. They had a four-game winning streak that ended at UT. His Sr. season won four games, Duke 42–37, #25 Ole Miss 31–9, Kentucky 20–7, and Navy 27–7.	
Ronnie Gordon	1993–1994	Gordon had a 9–13 record as a starter for Vanderbilt. Gordon led Vanderbilt to a victory over Georgia 43–30. Rushing for a career-high 126 yards and three touchdowns and passing for a touchdown.	
Damian Allen	1995–1997	Allen passed for 3,757 yards, 17 TD 28 ints, and rushed for 29 yards on 241 att and 4 TDs.	
Greg Zolman	1998–2001	Zolman became the starter for Vanderbilt about halfway through his freshman year in 1998 and was the starting quarterback the final three seasons. He was the all-time leading passer with 7,981 yards until surpassed by Jay Cutler. Zolman played on five different NFL teams: Buffalo, Green Bay, Indianapolis, St. Louis and Tampa. He played one season in NFL Europe.	
Jay Cutler	2002–2005	Played for the Denver Broncos, Chicago Bears, and the Miami Dolphins. Cutler was a Pro Bowl selection in (2008). SEC Offensive Player of the Year (2005), first-team All-SEC (2005). His last game was the first win over the Volunteers since 1982.	
Chris Nickson	2006–2008	Nickson's best year was 2006, when he was the everyday starter; he passed for 2,085 yards and 15 touchdowns. The next two years he split playing time with Mackenzi Adams, diminishing his passing numbers, finishing his career with 3,406 yards and 29 TDs. His 2008 team won seven games, including the first bowl game Vanderbilt played since the 1982 season. His 2008 team won five games to start the season, beating #24 South Carolina, as well as #13 Auburn. Vanderbilt was ranked #21 wk 4, #19 wk 5, #13 wk 6 and #22 wk 7 before going on a four-game losing streak, finishing the season two and six.	
Mackenzi Adams	2007–2009	Finished career with solid effort at Tennessee, hitting 19 of 35 passes for 174 yards and a touchdown, earning team's Offensive Player of the Week honors.	
Larry Smith	2008–2011	Larry's first win at Vanderbilt was vs. BCU. He was also the first Vanderbilt QB to play in two bowl games the 2008 Music City Bowl, and the 2011 Liberty Bowl. In 2013, he became a coach at Jacksonville State as a QB coach, and in 2016 became the WR coach at UAB.	
Erick Carson	2009	Cut due to ACL injury	
Jordan Rodgers	2011–2012	Brother of current Pittsburgh Steelers quarterback Aaron Rodgers. Jordan was named to the 2010, 2011 and 2012 SEC Academic Honor Roll. After football, he became one of the 25 eligible men who competed on the ABC TV show The Bachelorette for its 12th season and winning it. He works for the SEC Network as a commentator.	
Austyn Carta-Samuels	2012–2013	After college, he joined the coaching staff at Missouri as a Graduate Assistant, and Recruiting Coordinator.	
Patton Robinette	2013–2014	Tennessee's Gatorade Player of the Year in high school. Helped guide Vanderbilt to a come-from-behind win over nationally ranked Georgia	
Stephen Rivers	2014	Brother of current Indianapolis Colts quarterback Philip Rivers.	
Wade Freebeck	2014	Played for St. Thomas Aquinas High School.	
Johnny McCrary	2014–2015	Tied a school record and earned SEC Freshman of the Week honors with five touchdown passes in a 42–28 victory over Old Dominion. Jay Cutler and Bill Wade are the others to throw five. Johnny was replaced as starting QB after a lack of wins in the 2015 season, and decided to transfer from Vanderbilt before the 2016 season.	
Kyle Shurmur	2015–2018	Kyle's father is NFL coach Pat Shurmur, after a slow start to the 2015 season Vanderbilt started Shurmur for the last five games off the season. The 2016 season Shurmur lead Vanderbilt to the first bowl in three years, as well as a bowl vs Baylor 2018. Shurmur led Vanderbilt over Tennessee three consecutive years, 2016 45–35, 2017 42–24, 2018 38–13. Shurmur has the Vanderbilt passing records of 8,865 passing yards QB rate 128.2 64 TD	
Riley Neal	2019	Neal was a fifth-year senior transfer from Ball State. Johnny Unitas Golden Arm Award preseason watch list. Played in 11 games, started at quarterback in 10 of 11 appearances. Completed 57.8% of passes (149-of-258) for 1,585 yards and nine touchdowns. Came in relief of injured starter to help Commodores defeat Missouri. Efficient in win over Northern Illinois, completing 75% of passes (21-of-28). Threw for 378 yards and two touchdowns at Purdue. Hit 16 of 24 passes for 179 yards and two touchdowns in win over East Tennessee State	
Mo Hasan	2019	Hasan only started one game, a 21–14 win over No 21 Missouri, completing 7-of-11 passes (63.6%) for 120 yards and a TD, plus added 34 yards on 9 carries (3.8 avg) before suffering a season-ending concussion. Hasan transferd to USC before the 2020 season.	
Deuce Wallace	2019	Wallace started two games with zero wins.	
Ken Seals	2020–2021, 2023	Third true freshman quarterback to start a season opener in the SEC since 1972. Fifth Vanderbilt true freshman quarterback to eclipse 100 passing yards in a game. Fourth true freshman since 2012 to make his first two starts against top-20 team. Career-high 336 passing yards at Mississippi State, a Vandy freshman record. Third Vanderbilt true freshman to throw for 1,000 yards in a season.	
Mike Wright	2021–2022		
AJ Swann	2022–2023		
Diego Pavia	2024–2025	Diego Pavia transferred from New Mexico State and became the starting quarterback at Vanderbilt for his redshirt senior season. He led the Commodores to an upset win over No. 1 Alabama, giving Vanderbilt its first win over top-5 team in program history. He also led the Commodores to 6 wins, for their first season of bowl eligibility since 2018. He finished the 2024 regular season with 2,133 yards passing and 17 touchdowns to only 4 interceptions and finished the season 10th in the SEC in rushing, with 716 yards and 6 touchdowns.	

== Other starting quarterbacks ==
These are quarterbacks that started a few games in the season for special cases, or were backs who often passed the ball.

Name	Years Started	Notability	References
Joe Howell	1902	Played since the Tulane game after Kyle was injured.	
Jimmy R. Haygood	1904–1905	Spelled Kyle when he was injured.	
Hugh Potts	1907	Was quarterback in the 17 to 12 victory over Sewanee which netted the conference championship.	
Fred A. Robins	1912	His skills better suited to the mud, he led the team to its largest win in its history, a 105 to 0 win over Bethel.	
Jess Neely	1922	The captain and halfback of the undefeated squad was considered the team's best passer. College Football Hall of Fame as a coach.	
Walter B. Rountree	1922	He started the Mercer game. Much of the Mercer team had been struck with dengue fever, and Vanderbilt took the opportunity to rest its starters.	
Ralph Owen	1927	Once chairman of American Express. He started the Sewanee game.	
