= 1922 College Baseball All-Southern Team =

All-star college baseball team

The 1922 College Baseball All-Southern Team consists of baseball players selected at their respective positions after the 1922 NCAA baseball season.

== All-Southerns ==
Position	Name	School	Notes
Pitcher	Tige Stone	Mercer	CW, MB, WCM, MT [as U]
Pitcher	Jack Frost	Georgia	CW, MB, WCM, MT
Pitcher	Jim Joe Edwards	Mississippi College	CW, MB, WCM, MT
Pitcher	Collins	Georgia Tech	CW, MB, MT
Pitcher	Freddy Sale	Georgia	MB, WCM
Pitcher	Cliff Pantone	Georgia	CW
Pitcher	Llewelyn	UNC	WCM
Pitcher	Thompson	Mercer	MT
Pitcher	Grant	Auburn	MT
Catcher	Charlie Gibson	Auburn	CW, MB, WCM, MT
Catcher	Cotton Klindworth	Mississippi A&M	CW, MB, WCM
Catcher	Ward	Florida	MT
First baseman	Chief Cody	Georgia	CW, MB, WCM
First baseman	Tot McCullough	Vanderbilt	MT
Second baseman	Richardson	Auburn	CW, MB, WCM, MT [as SS]
Second baseman	Durnham	Kentucky	MT
Third baseman	Hall	Alabama	MB, WCM
Third baseman	Eddie Morgan	Georgia Tech	CW, MT
Shortstop	Doc Kuhn	Vanderbilt	CW, MB
Shortstop	Monk McDonald	UNC	WCM
Outfielder	Red Barron	Georgia Tech	CW, MB, WCM, MT
Outfielder	J. D. Thomason	Georgia	CW, MB, WCM, MT
Outfielder	Sox Ingram	Georgia Tech	CW, MB, MT
Outfielder	George Clarke	Georgia	MB [as U], WCM [as U], MT
Outfielder	Wilson	UNC	WCM
Outfielder	Sheppard	Mercer	MT
Outfielder	Hammock	Mercer	MT
Utility	Smith	Mercer	MT

== Key ==
MB = All-SIAA selected by Morgan Blake for the Atlanta Journal.

CW = selected by Cliff Wheatley for the Atlanta Constitution.

WCM = All-Southern selected W. C. Munday.

MT = selected by the Macon Telegraph.
