= 1921 College Baseball All-Southern Team =

All-star college baseball team

The 1921 College Baseball All-Southern Team consists of baseball players selected at their respective positions after the 1921 NCAA baseball season. Vanderbilt won the SIAA.

== All-Southerns ==
Position	Name	School	Notes
Pitcher	Jack Frost	Georgia	
Pitcher	Cliff Pantone	Georgia	CW
Pitcher	Tige Stone	Mercer	CW, MB
Pitcher	Chief Turk	Oglethorpe	CW, MB
Pitcher	Sunshine Thompson	Georgia Tech	CW, MB
Pitcher	Ollinger	Auburn	
Pitcher	George Johnston	Auburn	CW, MB
Pitcher	Jim Joe Edwards	Mississippi College	CW, MB
Catcher	Charlie Gibson	Auburn	
Catcher	Byrd Hope	Oglethorpe	CW, MB
Catcher	Luke Sewell	Alabama	CW, MB
First baseman	Lassiter	Auburn	
First baseman	Chief Cody	Georgia	CW, MB
First baseman	Bevo Webb	Georgia Tech	
Second baseman	Sam Barnes	Auburn	CW, MB
Third baseman	Eddie Morgan	Georgia Tech	CW
Third baseman	Lane	Tennessee	MB
Shortstop	Dot Fulghum	Auburn	CW, MB
Shortstop	Doc Kuhn	Vanderbilt	
Outfielder	Esau Settle	Georgia Tech	CW, MB
Outfielder	Red Barron	Georgia Tech	
Outfielder	Sox Ingram	Georgia Tech	MB
Outfielder	Roy Carlyle	Oglethorpe	
Outfielder	Ed Sherling	Auburn	
Outfielder	Manning Brown	Vanderbilt	
Outfielder	Boozer McWhorter	Georgia	
Outfielder	Country Mangum	Georgia	CW
Outfielder	Tot McCullough	Vanderbilt	CW
Outfielder	Scotty Neill	Vanderbilt	MB

== Key ==
MB = Morgan Blake's selection.

CW = Cliff Wheatley's selection.
