= 1923 College Baseball All-Southern Team =

All-star college baseball team

The 1923 College Baseball All-Southern Team consists of baseball players selected at their respective positions after the 1923 NCAA baseball season.

== All-Southerns ==
Position	Name	School	Notes
Pitcher	Tige Stone	Mercer	LE
Pitcher	Freddy Sale	Georgia	LE
Pitcher	Dempster	Trinity	LE
Pitcher	Rhem	Clemson	LE
Catcher	Charlie Gibson	Auburn	LE
Catcher	Pat Powers	Georgia	LE
First baseman	Tot McCullough	Vanderbilt	LE
Second baseman	Josh Watson	Georgia	LE
Third baseman	Skinny Denicke	Georgia Tech	LE
Shortstop	Grant Gillis	Alabama	LE
Outfielder	Clay Parrish	Oglethorpe	LE
Outfielder	George Clark	Georgia	LE
Outfielder	James David Thomason	Georgia	LE

== Key ==
LE = selected by the Columbus Ledger-Enquirer.
