= Oliver Kuhn =

American athlete (1898–1968)

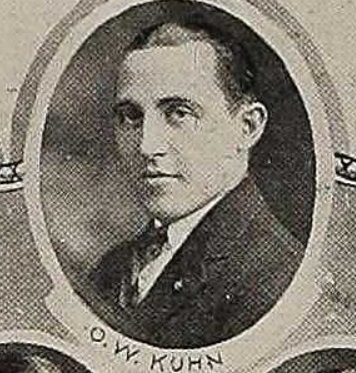
- Kuhn around 1922

Profile
- Position: Quarterback

Personal information
- Born: August 14, 1898; Nashville, Tennessee, U.S.
- Died: October 8, 1968 (aged 70); Tampa, Florida, U.S.
- Listed height: 5 ft 8 in (1.73 m)
- Listed weight: 155 lb (70 kg)

Career information
- High school: Montgomery Bell (1915–1917)
- College: Vanderbilt (1920–1923)

Awards and highlights
- SIAA championship (1921); SoCon championship (1922, 1923); Billy Evans' National Honor Roll (1922); All-America Honorable Mention (1922); SIAA championship (baseball, 1921); All-Southern (baseball, 1921, 1922); Two-sport captain (1923); Porter Cup (1923)

Oliver Wall Kuhn (August 14, 1898 – October 8, 1968), nicknamed "Doc Kuhn", was an American football, baseball and basketball player for the Vanderbilt University Commodores and later a prominent businessman of Tampa, Florida. As a college football quarterback, Kuhn led Vanderbilt to three consecutive Southern titles in 1921, 1922, and 1923 – the most-recent conference titles for Vanderbilt football. In 1922, Vanderbilt tied Michigan at the dedication of Dudley Field, and Kuhn was picked for Walter Camp's list of names worthy of mention and Billy Evans' All-America "National Honor Roll."

During his senior year, Kuhn was the captain of Vanderbilt's football and basketball teams and received the Porter Cup, awarded to Vanderbilt's best all-around athlete. Kuhn played guard on the basketball team and was a shortstop on the baseball team which won a 1921 conference championship. He was selected All-Southern in baseball in 1921 and 1922.

Kuhn moved to Tampa after graduation, where he helped start the athletics program at the University of Tampa, and later notably led an effort to plant podocarpus trees in downtown Tampa.

== Early years and background ==
Kuhn was born on August 14, 1898, in Nashville, Tennessee, the seventh child of Katherine Wall of Springfield, Kentucky and Ferdinand E. Kuhn, a secretary for the local board of public works. "Doc", who played old cat as a child, attended preparatory school at Cathedral High School and Montgomery Bell Academy (MBA). At MBA, he won two state football titles, first in 1915 as a sub and then in 1917 as a starter. (Note: The last two seasons were under coach and former Vanderbilt fullback Ammie Sikes.) Kuhn lost just a single game as MBA's starting quarterback. According to Kuhn's World War I draft registration, he worked for DuPont as a civil engineer in Jacksonville, Tennessee. He also spent time at Camp Taylor.

=== Notre Dame ===
In 1918, Kuhn played as an end on the freshman team at Notre Dame. George Gipp and Curly Lambeau were on the varsity, and it was Knute Rockne's first year as head coach.

== Vanderbilt University ==
Kuhn attended Vanderbilt University from 1919 to 1923. He was a member of Phi Kappa Psi, and chaired the Vanderbilt University dances.

=== Football ===
Kuhn quarterbacked Dan McGugin's Vanderbilt football teams from 1920 to 1923, after a year on the scrub team in 1919. His Commodores compiled an overall win–loss–tie record of 24–5–4 (.788) during his four years on the team, and a 15–2–3 (.825) record while he was a starter, including three consecutive conference titles, the most recent to date for Vanderbilt.

==== 1920 ====
During Kuhn's first year playing varsity football for Vanderbilt, the Commodores scored 47 points in the first half of a season-opening win against Birmingham–Southern due to the backfield of "Berryhill, Kuhn, Latham and Company". After two crushing defeats to Georgia Tech and Auburn, Vanderbilt played Kentucky State and won 20–0; Kuhn subbed for Latham so the starter could rest up for the next week's game against the Alabama Crimson Tide.

In a close game, and Alabama's first victory over the Commodores, Kuhn substituted for now-injured quarterback Latham and threw the one Vanderbilt touchdown pass to Jess Neely in the 14–7 loss. He also had a 60-yard kick return, and accumulated 94 yards in all. According to the Atlanta Constitution, "Doc Kuhn, subbing for the injured Latham, was the brilliant star of the day. Kuhn was practically unstoppable by the Alabamians and, time after time, threatened to lead the team to victory." In a 7–7 tie game against Virginia the following week, starting quarterback Kuhn was cited as an offensive standout. (Note: The tie "completely upset predictions" of a Virginia win, and Vanderbilt outplayed Virginia for three of the game's four quarters.)

==== 1921 ====
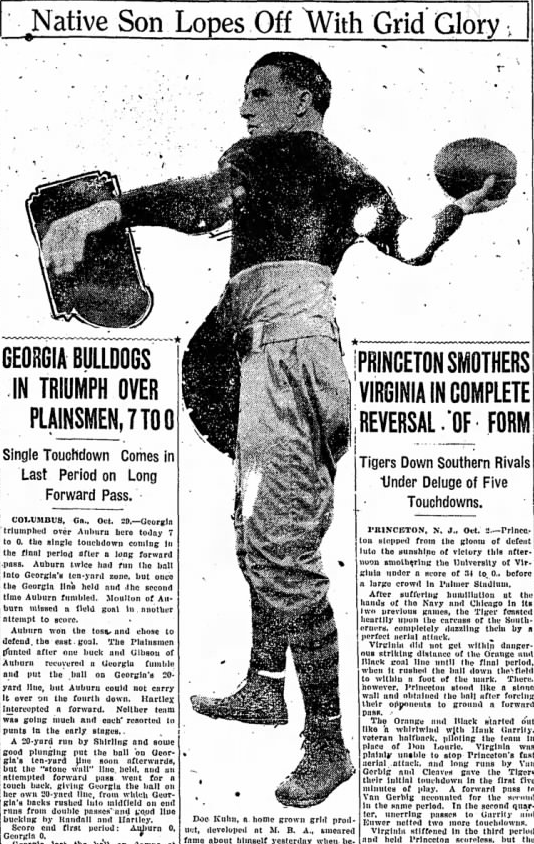
Kuhn about 1921

The Commodores tied for the 1921 Southern Intercollegiate Athletic Association (SIAA) football championship with an overall record of 7–0–1; Kuhn and Frank Godchaux took turns starting at quarterback. The season opened with a 34–0 victory against the Middle Tennessee State Normal School. The Commodore, Vanderbilt's yearbook, described the lopsided win: "Practically the only thing of note was the aerial efficiency—Kuhn to Ryan and Kuhn to McCullough".

The team defeated the Texas Longhorns 20–0 at the Texas State Fair in Dallas, although Texas was undefeated in the Southwest Conference the previous year and Vanderbilt was expected to lose by two touchdowns. The 1921 Texas team was considered possibly the best in Longhorns history, and Vanderbilt seemed to be declining when Georgia Tech beat them 44–0 the year before. Dan McGugin invoked the late former Vanderbilt quarterback Irby Curry, who was killed in the war, before the game. According to Edwin Pope's Football's Greatest Coaches, "The Texas game, sparked by McGugin's unforgettable oratory, was the big one; and Vandy got out of the year without a loss." In the last scoring drive, Kuhn completed a pass to end Tot McCullough at the 8-yard (7.3 m) line to put the ball in scoring position for Godchaux after an offside penalty.

The next week Vanderbilt played the Tennessee Volunteers on a wet Old Dudley Field. Team captain Pink Wade did not play because of low back pain, and Kuhn substituted as captain. Kuhn rushed for two touchdowns in a 14–0 victory. (Note: On the same day, Centre upset Harvard 6–0, in what is widely considered one of the greatest upsets in college football history.) The Tennessee coaches "never saw, in all the spying trips, such interference as the Commodores made yesterday for Doc Kuhn," remarked Blinkey Horn. In the first quarter, Kuhn's end run of 19 yards (17 m) made the score 7–0; in the second, he had a 30 yards (27 m) touchdown run with Lynn Bomar as lead blocker. As Horn recalled, Kuhn "made possible the touchdown by miraculous sidestepping", evading two tacklers — "miraculous because of the treacherous footing."

In the 14–0 victory over Alabama, Kuhn did not start due to injuries. Entering the game in the fourth quarter, with the Commodores leading 7–0, Kuhn completed a 25-yard (23 m) pass to McCullough after Jess Neely's 21-yard (19 m) run. (Note: After gaining a few more yards, the Commodores scored their second touchdown. The next week, they tied defending SIAA champion Georgia 7–7 with a touchdown on a fourth-quarter onside kick from scrimmage, and defeated Sewanee the week after that.)

==== 1922 ====
Kuhn was the starting quarterback for a second consecutive undefeated season in 1922, when Vanderbilt had an 8–0–1 record. He started all but one game at quarterback, including a scoreless tie with Michigan in the inaugural game at Dudley Field. Vanderbilt held the tie with a goal-line stand, and the result was called "a great surprise to the sporting world"; Commodore fans celebrated by throwing seat cushions onto the field.

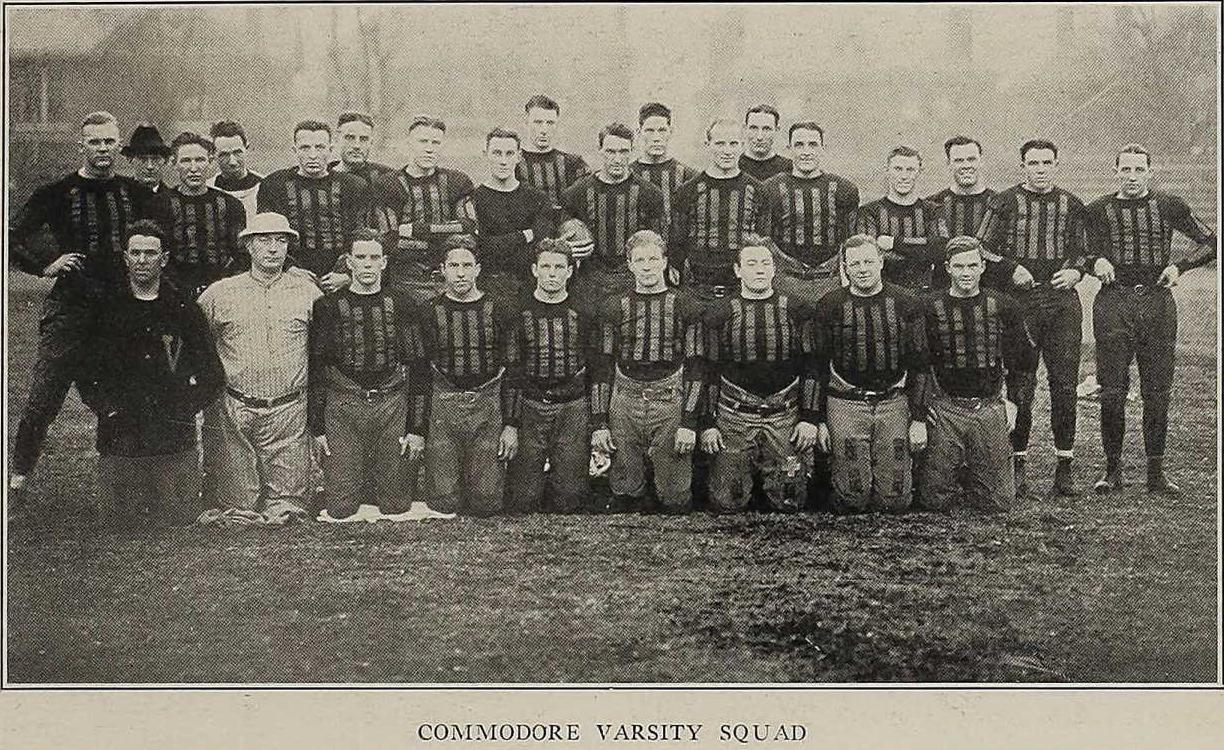
1922 team picture; Kuhn is at far right.

After the next game, a 20–10 Commodore victory against Texas at the Texas State Fair, Kuhn's running game and leadership were praised. (Note: According to referee Alfred Michael "Chief" Venne, the Texas defeat was due to the Commodores' "head work.") In a 14–6 win against Tennessee, Kuhn caught a 31-yard (28 m) pass from Jess Neely for a touchdown. He returned a kick for 44 yards (40 m) against Kentucky, tackled by the last man before the end zone, but the half ended before the Commodores could score. The Athens Banner described the team's arrival for a game with Georgia: "The Commodores arrived here at one o'clock Friday afternoon, and were whisked directly to the Georgian Hotel. Curious hundreds of Bulldog supporters shuddered at the procession of Vandy giants as they strolled down the sidewalks, led by Huge Tot McCullough, with spry Froggy Miers and clever Doc Kuhn bringing up the rear." Kuhn dropped back, throwing Lynn Bomar a 40-plus-yard pass for Vanderbilt's second touchdown in its 12–0 victory over Georgia at Sanford Field.

He finished the season against Sewanee on Thanksgiving Day. In the first quarter, a trick play caught Sewanee off guard. On the previous play, Kuhn ran six yards out of bounds. Then, on a fake run, he threw a pass to Bomar, who was alone behind the defense and ran the rest of the way for a touchdown. Kuhn featured in a second-quarter scoring drive, completing a 10-yard pass to Scotty Neill inside the five-yard line and faking his way through the line for a touchdown. The Commodores won, 26–0; Kuhn was selected for Billy Evans' All-American "National Honor Roll", and received an honorable mention on Walter Camp's team. Kuhn and Centre's Flash Covington were the two quarterbacks from Evans' All-Southern team to receive Camp's mention. At the December 5, 1922 Vanderbilt football banquet, Kuhn was elected Commodore captain for the following season.

==== 1923 ====
In late May 1923, Kuhn received the Porter Cup as Vanderbilt's best all-around athlete. According to the Atlanta Constitution, "Doc Kuhn, in winning the Porter Cup, has taken the last leaf in the laurel. Offered each year by the Porter Clothing company, the trophy has risen in distinction from a mere silver emblem to a symbol more highly prized than which there is none to offer to a Vanderbilt athlete". Kuhn was also captain of the basketball team, president of the student council, president of Phi Kappa Psi and Hellenic president. The Atlanta Journal said, "Doc Kuhn is captain and president of everything at Vanderbilt but the co-eds". The only two football games he lost at Vanderbilt were in 1923, to undefeated teams: national champion Michigan and the Texas Longhorns. The Commodores were Southern Conference (SoCon) co-champion in 1923, with two All-Southern ends–Lynn Bomar and Hek Wakefield, and All-Southern halfback Gil Reese.

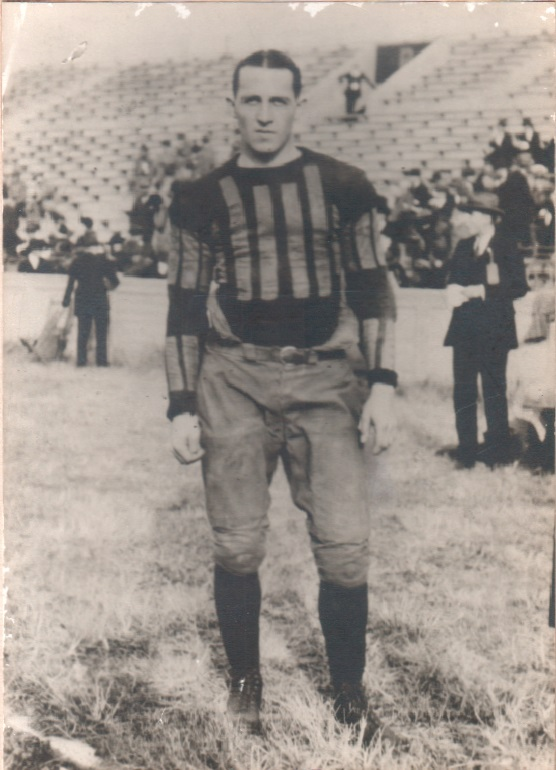
Kuhn on opening day, 1923

Kuhn returned a kickoff 80 yards (73 m) in the season's first game, against the Howard Bulldogs. A rematch with Michigan at Ferry Field was a 3–0 loss, with consensus All-American center Jack Blott kicking the winning field goal for the Wolverines. Although Kuhn and Reese were said to raise fans to their feet with their speed, they were hampered by Michigan's defense. According to a diagram of the game's plays, the only completed Vanderbilt pass was from Kuhn to Bomar.

After a lackluster 2–2–1 season start, Vanderbilt beat Tennessee and Georgia by a combined 86–14 score with Kuhn scoring the first of the seven touchdowns against Tennessee. He completed a 45-yard (41 m) pass to Wakefield against Georgia, getting Vanderbilt to the four-yard line. The longest of Gil Reese's four touchdowns against Georgia was an 81-yard (74 m) run "behind great interference furnished by the entire Vandy team, and especially Bomar and Kuhn." According to former Vanderbilt assistant and Alabama head coach Wallace Wade, who was scouting Georgia at the game, the Commodores that day were "the smartest I ever saw". The season's final game, against Sewanee in the rain, was a 7–0 Vanderbilt win on a touchdown pass from Kuhn to Reese.

The Florida Gators defeated the Alabama Crimson Tide 16–6 that day, ensuring a share of the Southern title for Vanderbilt. A postseason charity game against former and contemporary Princeton Tigers all-stars ended in a 7–7 tie, with the Vanderbilt touchdown scored on an 18-yard (16 m) pass from Kuhn to Bomar. Vanderbilt and Washington and Lee finished the season as SoCon co-champion. A sportswriters' poll gave the Commodores the Champ Pickens Trophy as the best team in the South, and it was presented to Kuhn at the annual football banquet on December 4.

=== Basketball ===
Kuhn lettered at guard for Vanderbilt's basketball team in 1922 and 1923. (Note: His teammate, All-Southern forward Alvin (Pep) Bell, was his backup on the football team.) The 1921–22 team had an 8–8 record. (Note: The 1921–22 Vanderbilt basketball team was the first to play rival Tennessee.) In the Southern Intercollegiate Athletic Association (SIAA) tournament, the Commodores defeated the Citadel Bulldogs 37–22 before losing to the Georgia Bulldogs 27–26. Kuhn scored 10 points against the Citadel and four against Georgia.

The 1922–23 team, captained by Kuhn, went 16–8, defeating the LSU Tigers before losing to the Virginia Tech Hokies in the SIAA tournament. According to Ed Danforth, "Either Vanderbilt was in rare form or L.S.U. has a good fighting team with no shooting ability. Fans were treated to the most one-sided contest of opening day when these two clubs met, the Commodores scoring 13 points before the Louisianans had counted once, winning 36 to 10." Kuhn scored two points. Sportswriter Morgan Blake called Kuhn "the best basketball player on the Vandy team."

=== Baseball ===
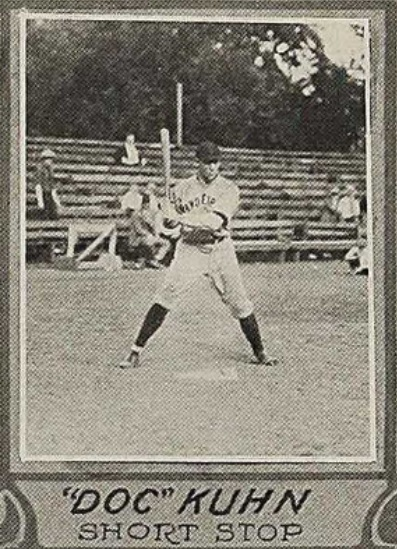
Kuhn at bat in 1922

Kuhn was a shortstop for the Vanderbilt Commodores baseball team, including a claim to the 1921 SIAA championship. The 1921 team had a 20–5 record (14–4 SIAA). According to Vanderbilt's yearbook, The Commodore, in a 1921 game against Southwestern Presbyterian University the team scored a world-record 13 runs in one inning with two outs. The Tennessean said:

[Jess] Neely singled, as did Kuhn; Neil fanned, but Thomas got his third straight hit and both tallied. Big Tot was hit by a pitched ball and Smith was safe on a fielder's choice with one out. Woodruf flied out to right. Tyner slammed one to center which Jetty juggled and everybody advanced a pair of sacks. Ryan was safe on another error and two runs came over. Neely beat out his second hit of the inning and Kuhn walked. Neil walked. Thomas was safe on an error and Big Tot McCullough picked one over the right field fence, clearing the sacks–but oh, what's the use? Why continue?

Kuhn and Dot Fulghum of Auburn University were considered the South's best shortstops. According to a 1922 newspaper report:

Doc Kuhn is possibly the greatest ball player on the squad, due to his miraculous fielding around short this season. Starting with the opening college games he went for six straight games without an error, finally putting Tot McCullough off the bag with a wide heave that broke the run. The Michigan and Ohio coaches were loud in their praises for Kuhn as one of the greatest fielding shortstops they had seen in some time. His hitting this season has been hard and timely, including a homer, four triples, and three doubles. He hits in streaks, however, and this alone will keep the phenomenal Vandy star out of a major berth in the near future. Kuhn, Embry and McCullough stand out head and shoulders above anybody in their respective lines that has visited here in recent years.

Kuhn was the only Vanderbilt baseball player named All-Southern by either Cliff Wheatley or Morgan Blake in 1922. Wheatley's choice read, "Vanderbilt's sole representative is "Doc" Kuhn, who came in several lengths ahead of the other shortstops. Kuhn is a wonderful batter and fields well enough in comparison with other Dixie infielders". For Blake, "the best shortstop in the S. I. A. A. was Doc Kuhn of Vanderbilt, a great all-around athlete ... He looks like a big leaguer in action."

== Later life ==
After graduating from Vanderbilt in 1923 with a Bachelor of Science degree in commerce, Kuhn worked for the Cheek-Neal Coffee Company in Chicago. He married Nancy Lee Pierce at Lylehurst in Nashville, the home of Pierce's aunt R.J. Lyles, on October 27, 1924. By 1926, Kuhn and his wife moved to Tampa, Florida, where he was a stockbroker, his profession for the rest of his life. He was a member of Sacred Heart Catholic Church, Ye Mystic Krewe of Gasparilla, and the University Club. Kuhn was a charter member of the Merrymaker's Club, the Sword and Shield Club, and the Tampa Quarterback Club and was once president of the State and Tampa Exchange Club and the Tampa Junior Chamber of Commerce. He also aided the start of the athletics program at the University of Tampa.

Kuhn led an initiative to plant podocarpus trees in downtown Tampa, for which he was named Man of the Year a year before his death. A tree was planted on Bayshore Boulevard in his honor. He died at his home in Tampa on October 8, 1968. (Note: Pallbearers at his funeral included Vanderbilt teammates Jess Neely and Alf Sharpe and sportswriter Fred Russell.)

== See also ==
- 1922 College Football All-America Team
- 1922 College Football All-Southern Team
- List of Vanderbilt Commodores starting quarterbacks
