= 1920 College Baseball All-Southern Team =

All-star college baseball team

The 1920 College Baseball All-Southern Team consists of baseball players selected at their respective positions after the 1920 NCAA baseball season.

== All-Southerns ==
Position	Name	School	Notes
Pitcher	George Johnston	Auburn	FA, CB, ST, JEC
Pitcher	Tige Stone	Mercer	FA, CB, ST, JEC
Pitcher	Chief Turk	Oglethorpe	FA
Pitcher	Jim Joe Edwards	Mississippi College	FA
Pitcher	Pond Lippitt	Georgia	CB
Catcher	Tyner	Vanderbilt	CB, ST, JEC
Catcher	Hope	Oglethorpe	FA
First baseman	W. J. Lassiter	Auburn	FA, CB, ST, JEC
Second baseman	Joe Sewell	Alabama	FA, CB, ST. JEC
Third baseman	Turner	Georgia Tech	FA, CB
Shortstop	Riggs Stephenson	Alabama	FA, CB, ST [as 3rd], JEC [as 3rd]
Shortstop	Dot Fulghum	Auburn	JEC
Outfielder	Claude Satterfield	Georgia	FA, CB, ST, JEC
Outfielder	Red Barron	Georgia Tech	FA, CB, JEC
Outfielder	Gink Hendrick	Vanderbilt	FA
Outfielder	Carson	Mercer	CB, JEC [as U]
Outfielder	Red Lenoir	Alabama	ST
Outfielder	Mangum	Georgia	ST
Outfielder	Clarke	Georgia	JEC
Utility	Sam Barnes	Auburn	ST

== Key ==
FA = Oglethorpe coach Frank B. Anderson's selections.

CB = Sportswriter Carlton W. Binns selections.

ST = Georgia coach Herman Stegeman's selections.

JEC = Mercer coach J. E. Clements selections.
