= Henican =

Henican is a surname. Notable people with the surname include:

- C. Ellis Henican (1905–1997), American lawyer and athlete
- Ellis Henican (born 1958), American journalist
