= Scotty Neill =

American physician

Francis K. Neill
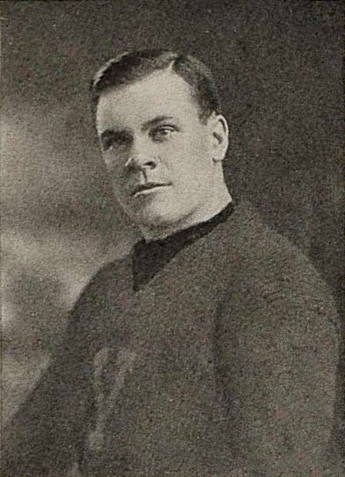
- Neill c. 1922

No. 20
- Position: End/Punter

Personal information
- Born: November 17, 1895; Birmingham, Alabama, U.S.
- Died: July 7, 1963 (aged 67); Albany, Georgia, U.S.
- Listed weight: 170 lb (77 kg)

Career information
- College: Birmingham–Southern (c. 1918); Vanderbilt (1919–1920; 1922)

Awards and highlights
- SoCon championship (1922); All-Southern (1922); SIAA championship (baseball) (1921); Bachelor of Ugliness (1922)

Francis Kennedy "Scotty" Neill (November 17, 1895 – July 7, 1963) was an American football and baseball player for the Vanderbilt Commodores of Vanderbilt University. He won the Bachelor of Ugliness in 1922, Vanderbilt's highest honor for a male undergraduate. Neill was a member of the Sigma Nu fraternity, and graduated with an M. D. in 1925.

== Early life ==
Neill was born on November 17, 1895, in Birmingham, Alabama, to Peter Neill and Rosina Jones Dollop.

== Vanderbilt ==
=== Baseball ===
==== 1921 ====
Neill was a member of the 1921 SIAA champion Vanderbilt baseball team. Neill often batted cleanup in his time with the Commodores, referred to as the "Babe Ruth of the SIAA." Neill led the team in home runs with 13. Vanderbilt's yearbook The Commodore states that in a 1921 game against Southwestern Presbyterian University, the team achieved a world record in scoring 13 runs in one inning, after two men were out. The Tennessean recalls the event: "Neely singled as did Kuhn; Neil fanned but Thomas got his third straight hit and both tallied. Big Tot got hit by a pitched ball and Smith was safe on a fielder's choice with one out. Woodruf flied out to right. Tyner slammed one to center which Jetty juggled and everybody advanced a pair of sacks. Ryan was safe on another error and two runs came over. Neely beat out his second hit of the inning and Kuhn walked. Neil walked. Thomas was safe on an error and Big Tot McCullough picked one over the right field fence, clearing the sacks--but oh, what's the use? Why continue?"

In the game against Camp Benning (GA), Neill netted a home run with a fly ball to left field, which bounced off the outfielder's knee and over the fence.

Neill was ruled ineligible for baseball in 1922.

=== Football ===
Neill was also a prominent member of Dan McGugin's Vanderbilt Commodores football teams in 1920 and 1922, which had a win-loss-tie record of 12–3–2 over his two seasons, and won a Southern championship in 1922.

==== 1920 ====
Scotty Neill had fine punts, of 45 to 60 yards, in a 20–0 over the Tennessee Volunteers in the second week of play. In the second half of the final game, a 21–3 victory over the Sewanee Tigers, Neill punted the ball from the 35-yard line to the 4-yard line, picked up by Vanderbilt running back Grailey Berryhill and run into the end zone to score on a "bewildering" onside kick.

==== 1922 ====
In the second a game, a 33 to 0 victory over Henderson-Brown, the final score came late in the fourth quarter. Guard Garland Morrow broke through the line and jumped to block a punt, recovered by Neill for a touchdown. The next week saw the scoreless tie with the Michigan Wolverines at the dedication of Dudley Field, for which Neill was a starter. Before the game in which Vanderbilt was expected to lose, and had sustained many injuries in weeks prior, it was noted the more optimistic Vanderbilt faithful were excited for the return of Neill to the team. His punting matching that of the famed Harry Kipke, with an average of some 42 yards per punt, was cited as a key feature of the contest. Vanderbilt beat Texas the next week 20–10. Neill's punting again received praise. He had punts of 60 and 55 yards that game. Neill had a penalty for slugging that game, for which he would have been ejected had Texas captain and center "Swede" Swenson not protested to keep Neill in the game. In the next game, a 14–6 win over Tennessee, Neill out-punted the Volunteers on nearly every occasion. Neill was on Walter Camp's all names worthy of mention, listed with "punter" beside his name among the ends, as well as Billy Evans's Southern honor roll, the All-Southern team of Zipp Newman, sporting editor of the Birmingham News, and on the second team of All-Southerns chosen by Homer George, sporting editor for the Atlanta Constitution.
