= Menville (surname) =

Menville is a surname. Notable people with this surname include:

- Chuck Menville (1940–1992), American animator and writer for television
- Johnny Menville (early 20th century), American college football player and physician
- Scott Menville (born 1971), American actor, voice actor and musician
