= Jess Neely =

American football player and coach (1898–1983)

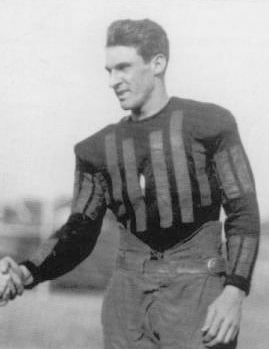
- Neely in 1922

Biographical details
- Born: January 4, 1898; Smyrna, Tennessee, U.S.
- Died: April 9, 1983 (aged 85); Weslaco, Texas, U.S.

Playing career

Football
- 1917: Middle Tennessee State
- 1920–1922: Vanderbilt
- Position: Halfback

Coaching career (HC unless noted)

Football
- 1924–1927: Southwestern (TN)
- 1928–1930: Alabama (assistant)
- 1931–1939: Clemson
- 1940–1966: Rice

Baseball
- 1929–1930: Alabama
- 1932–1938: Clemson
- 1945: Rice
- 1948: Rice

Administrative career (AD unless noted)
- 1931–1939: Clemson
- 1940–1967: Rice
- 1967–1971: Vanderbilt
- 1973: Vanderbilt (interim AD)

Head coaching record
- Overall: 207–176–19 (football); 109–108–5 (baseball)
- Bowls: 4–3

Accomplishments and honors

Championships
- 4 SWC (1946, 1949, 1953, 1957)

Awards
- Amos Alonzo Stagg Award (1967)
- College Football Hall of Fame; Inducted in 1971 (profile)

Jesse Claiborne Neely (January 4, 1898 – April 9, 1983) was an American football player, a baseball and football coach. He was head football coach at Southwestern University (now Rhodes College) from 1924 to 1927, at Clemson University from 1931 to 1939 and at Rice University from 1940 to 1966, compiling a career college football record of 207–176–19. He was inducted into the College Football Hall of Fame as a coach in 1971.

Neely was also the head baseball coach at the University of Alabama (1929–1930), at Clemson (1932–1938) and at Rice (1945 and 1948), tallying a career college baseball mark of 109–108–5.

== Early years and ancestry ==
Neely was born on January 4, 1898, in Smyrna, Tennessee to William Daniel Neely, Sr. and Mary Elizabeth Gooch. His father died of sunstroke in 1900. His mother's father was John Gooch, a farmer and breeder of thoroughbred horses in Goochland. John, known as "Colonel Jack", organized the Company E of the 20th Tennessee Regiment during the American Civil War.

His brother, Bill Neely, Jr., was a captain and All-Southern end on the undefeated 1910 Vanderbilt football team. Jess attended Branham and Hughes Military Academy.

== Playing career ==
=== Middle Tennessee State ===
The First Fifty Years: A History of Middle Tennessee State College recounts Neely's days playing for Middle Tennessee State Normal School:

Jess Neely, a brilliant half-back and a handsome man on the campus, is remembered for his popularity among members of the opposite sex and for an incident that occurred just prior to a football game with Southern Presbyterian in Clarksville. Miles had done an exceptionally good job in mentally preparing his team for the game. He climaxed the pre-game, locker-room exhortation with a soaring call for courage and deathless allegiance to "dear Ol' Normal." Neely was greatly affected by the words of his coach for he leaped to his feet and, roaring like an angry bull, led the team in a rush to the doorway opening to the field. He misjudged the extremely low entrance, and his head received the full impact of the strip of wall above the doorway. He was revived shortly before the kickoff, but he never quite knew where he was, frequently huddling and aligning himself with the enemy.

That team included Preston Vaughn Overall and Rupert Smith, who rejoined Neely on the 1921 Vanderbilt team.

=== Vanderbilt ===
Neely played football at Vanderbilt University from 1920 to 1922 under head coach Dan McGugin. He was captain and halfback of the undefeated 1922 team, and its best passer. Neely belonged to the Delta Tau Delta fraternity.

==== 1920 ====
Although the Commodores expected a "hard game against the university rivals", Vanderbilt shut out Tennessee 20–0. All three Commodore touchdowns came from passes by Neely to Gink Hendrick. Neely's long first-quarter pass hit Hendrick, who ran 25 yards for the touchdown. In the second quarter Hendrick ran to the 4-yard line on a pass from Neely, and the first half ended with Vanderbilt in possession at the Tennessee one-foot line. Hendrick caught another 30-yard touchdown pass from Neely in the fourth quarter. Two weeks later the Commodores lost 56–6 to one of Auburn's greatest teams, Vanderbilt's worst defeat since its 83–0 loss to Georgia Tech in 1917. The Commodores had only one first down, and never moved the ball beyond their 40-yard line. Neely was one of Vanderbilt's few stars, blocking well and passing Vanderbilt's only touchdown to Hendrick in the end zone.

In a "thriller from the start," the Alabama Crimson Tide defeated Vanderbilt for the first time on November 6, 1920, by a score of 14–7. A forward pass from Doc Kuhn to Neely gave the Commodores their sole touchdown. The following week, "expecting one of the greatest football games of the year", Vanderbilt had a difficult practice schedule before its game with the Virginia Cavaliers; Virginia and Vanderbilt tied, 7–7. Early in the game, Vanderbilt mounted a swift offense, with Neely throwing Hendrick a touchdown pass. That season, Vanderbilt opponents gained less on punt returns than they did against any other team in the South because of coverage by Percy Conyers and Neely.

==== 1921 ====
===== Football =====
In the second week of the 1921 season the Commodores shut out the Mercer Baptists, 42–0. Neely helped score one of four second-quarter touchdowns with a 55-yard pass to end Tot McCullough, and had a 25-yard punt return in the second half. In the next game, a 21–14 victory over the Kentucky Wildcats, the Wildcats scored against the Commodores for the first time in their history. Kentucky's second possession began with Bob Lavin fumbling the return, which was recovered by Neely on the 10-yard line. On third down, after little gain on first and second, Frank Godchaux ran an end-around touchdown. Rupe Smith scored the other two touchdowns, his first on a drive begun with a 22-yard pass from Neely to captain Pink Wade (father of later Vanderbilt quarterback Bill Wade). One Kentucky touchdown followed a blocked Neely punt. The Wildcats threatened to score late and tie the game, but they turned the ball over on downs at the two-yard line; Neely ran 34 yards, to the 36-yard line.

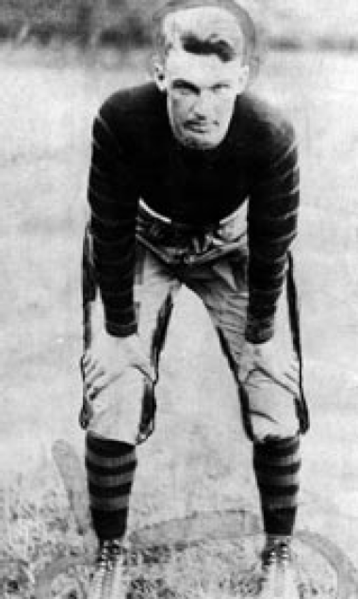
Neely around 1921

In the season's sixth week, Vanderbilt defeated Alabama 14–0 at Birmingham in line with predictions. Neely played a role in both touchdowns. Early in the first quarter, Vanderbilt had the ball at midfield after an Alabama punt. Two line bucks preceded Neely's connection with Tot McCullough for a 30-yard pass play. Neely ran for about 17 yards more through left tackle, putting the ball on the nine-yard line. After a run by Frank Godchaux, Lynn Bomar bucked over the line for the touchdown and Rupe Smith made the field goal. The second scoring drive began with a pass interception by Paul Stumb. In the second half, quarterback Doc Kuhn invigorated the Commodores after he sat out the first half due to injuries; Neely ran for 21 yards around the right end, and Kuhn passed 25 yards to Tot McCullough. Rupe Smith (or Kuhn) then ran the remaining few yards for the touchdown.

For its seventh game, Vanderbilt faced the defending Southern Intercollegiate Athletic Association (SIAA) champion Georgia Bulldogs at home. The game, the highlight of Vanderbilt's season, was described by The New York Times as an "important clash" and would determine the SIAA champion. Georgia scored during the first half; early in the fourth quarter Neely intercepted a pass, weaving for 25 yards to Georgia's 40-yard line before he was tackled by Jim Reynolds. Two long pass attempts failed, and Thomas Ryan lined up to punt. Rupert Smith sneaked behind Ryan; he rushed to recover the 25-yard onside kick, jumping up to get the ball off a bounce from the Bulldogs and racing for a 15-yard touchdown. The game ended in a tie, and the teams shared the SIAA championship. Vanderbilt finished its season against Sewanee in "the muddiest game in its history"; the Commodores were reportedly knee-deep in mud and water, with the players unrecognizable. The game was scoreless until the fourth quarter, when Sewanee fumbled the snap on a punt; the punter was smothered by the Commodores' Neely, Godchaux and Wade for a safety. Hek Wakefield later scored a touchdown for a 9–0 Vanderbilt win.

===== Baseball =====
Neely was a member of the 1921 SIAA champion Vanderbilt baseball team. According to The Commodore, the school yearbook, in a 1921 game against Southwestern Presbyterian University the team scored a world record 13 runs in one inning with two out. The Tennessean reported:

Neely singled as did Kuhn; Neil fanned but Thomas got his third straight hit and both tallied. Big Tot got hit by a pitched ball and Smith was safe on a fielder's choice with one out. Woodruf flied out to right. Tyner slammed one to center which Jetty juggled and everybody advanced a pair of sacks. Ryan was safe on another error and two runs came over. Neely beat out his second hit of the inning and Kuhn walked. Neil walked. Thomas was safe on an error and Big Tot McCullough picked one over the right field fence, clearing the sacks--but oh, what's the use? Why continue?

==== 1922 ====
Neely was captain of the undefeated 1922 team. In the second week of play Vanderbilt shut out Henderson-Brown 33–0, with Neely scoring a third-quarter touchdown. Despite an injured left arm, he started in the scoreless tie with Michigan at the dedication at Dudley Field. Vanderbilt was forced to punt from its seven-yard line early in the first quarter. The Wolverines completed their first pass (from Doug Roby to Paul Goebel), setting in motion a change in field position which placed them inside the five-yard line. The Commodore punt was partially blocked, giving Michigan the ball at Vanderbilt's 25-yard line. Two end runs, two line bucks and a forward pass brought them to first and goal after six minutes. The Commodore defense stiffened, repelling four touchdown tries; three runs up the middle were stopped before the goal line. Franklin Cappon gained a yard, Harry Kipke lost one and Cappon drove to within a foot of the goal; Neely was heard shouting, "Stop 'em!" On fourth down, Michigan faked a field goal and ran with Harry Kipke off tackle to the right. Kipke was tackled inches from the end zone. A Vanderbilt player pushed himself off the goal post to generate a greater backwards push as the crowd cheered. Vanderbilt's only noteworthy offensive play occurred soon afterwards. The Commodores punted out of the shadow of their goalpost after a goal line stand; Neely tackled Kipke (or Irwin Uteritz) hard on the punt return, causing a fumble which he recovered. He then connected on a 20–plus-yard pass to Tot McCullough. This gave Vanderbilt the ball at Michigan's 20-yard line, but subsequent Vanderbilt plays saw runs stopped with little gain and a pass intercepted by Uteritz. The tie was reportedly preserved when Neely recovered a fumble near the Commodore goal. He and Lynn Bomar were acknowledged as Vanderbilt's players of the game, and Neely wept tears of joy by the game's end. Bomar spent much of his day tackling Michigan runners, and Neely was a battered, bruised captain playing hard despite his injuries. Franklin Cappon said after the game, "What sort of a crazy man is this Neely? He played like a fiend and when he tackled me I thought I was broken in two. When I got up he was crying and cussed me out. I was the one who should have been crying".

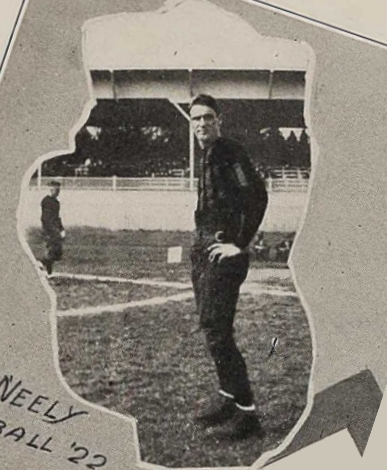
Neely in 1922

At the Texas State Fair game in Dallas against the Texas Longhorns, an early surge saw Texas at Vanderbilt's 18-yard line. McGugin sent in Neely, his injured captain. It worked to some extent, with Texas losing yards and ending up at the 17-yard line; Franklin Stacy then kicked a field goal. After a Vanderbilt touchdown, the offenses exchanged punts before Neely ran back a 30-yard punt return. The 60-yard drive which followed was capped by a 46-yard touchdown run by Gil Reese. In the fourth quarter, Neely hit Bomar with a 23-yard pass and Bomar ran for 20 yards more, close to the goal. Reese ran it in on the next play and the field goal was good, giving the Commodores a 20–10 victory.

Vanderbilt defeated the Tennessee Volunteers 14–6, with both touchdowns on passes from Neely. The first was in the second quarter, on a 31-yard pass to Doc Kuhn; in the fourth quarter, a five-yard pass to Lynn Bomar also scored a touchdown. Neely-to-Bomar is considered one of the best pass-receiver combinations in Vanderbilt history. In the game against the Georgia Bulldogs, Neely connected with Bomar on a long pass thrown from a few yards behind the line of scrimmage at the 45-yard line. Bomar caught it around the seven-yard line before being tackled by Georgia halfback Loren Chester (Teany) Randall at about the three-yard line. The next series of downs produced a touchdown by Gil Reese on his second run at the left tackle. Although Neely was sidelined by injury in the second quarter, Vanderbilt won 12–0. At the end of the season, he was on Walter Camp's list of players worthy of mention, and Vanderbilt compiled an 8–0–1 record. The season was among the best in school and Southern football history; according to a number of publications, Vanderbilt's season was the best in the South.

One of the highest honors a student could receive at Vanderbilt was Bachelor of Ugliness, created by William H. Dodd in 1885 and given to the male undergraduate student considered most representative of ideal young manhood. In 1923, Neely received the award.

== Coaching career ==
After Neely graduated from Vanderbilt with a law degree in 1924, he began his coaching career at Murfreesboro High School in Tennessee and ran a farm-loan business. His college-football coaching career began at Rhodes College (then known as Southwestern University), a job he got thanks to former coach McGugin's recommendation, where he had a 20–17–2 record from 1924 to 1927. Neely was assistant baseball coach at Princeton in the spring of 1928 before going to Alabama. From 1928 to 1930, Neely was assistant football coach under former Vanderbilt assistant Wallace Wade, and compiled a 28–15–2 record as the school's head baseball coach from 1929 to 1930.

From 1931 to 1939 he coached football at Clemson, compiling a 43–35–7 record. Neely coached at Rice from 1940 to 1966 with a 144–124–10 record, the most wins by a Rice coach.

He won the first four bowl games he coached: the 1940 Cotton Bowl (with Clemson), the 1946 Orange Bowl and the 1949 and 1953 Cotton Bowls (with Rice). However, at Rice, he also lost the last three bowl games he coached: the 1957 Cotton Bowl, the 1960 Sugar Bowl and 1961 Bluebonnet Bowl.

=== Clemson ===
Neely coached the Tigers during what is known as the "Seven Lean Years", and helped start the first booster club. The 1939 team lost only to Tulane. In the 1940 Cotton Bowl, Neely's Tigers upset Frank Leahy's Boston College Eagles. Banks McFadden led the Tigers.

=== Rice ===
Neely was hired by Rice in 1940 and led the team to a six-win turnaround. Neely's 1946 team won the Southwest Conference and the Orange Bowl. Weldon Humble starred for the Owls The 1949 team won the Southwest Conference and the Cotton Bowl, and Neely was named the conference's coach of the year. Hall of Fame end Froggy Williams was "the most important cog" in Neely's "gridiron machine". The 1949 team won the Cotton Bowl.

In 1953 Neely's Rice team again won the Cotton Bowl. The game featured one of college football's most famous plays. Dicky Moegle had broken free on a run when he was tackled by Tommy Lewis, who had come off the sidelines from Alabama's bench. Moegle was awarded a touchdown for the illegal play.

Buddy Dial tied Williams's records in 1958. Rice lost the 1960 Sugar Bowl to national champion Ole Miss. Neely's last road win was a 20–17 upset over the Texas Longhorns in 1965.

== Athletic director at Vanderbilt ==
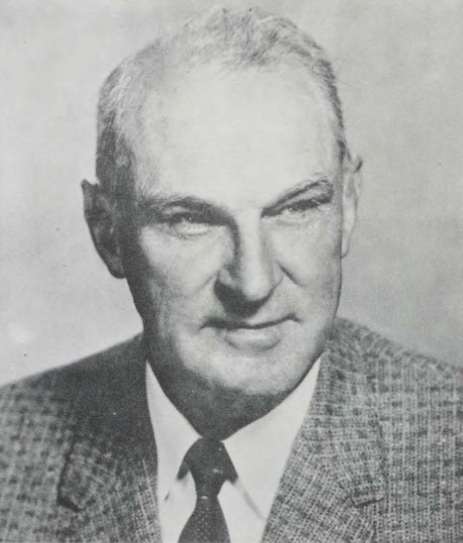
Neely c. 1961

After the 1966 season he returned to Vanderbilt as athletic director, and received the Amos Alonzo Stagg Award the following year. Neely brought the football program out of a dire financial situation.

Jess convinced Sam Fleming, who was involved at that time in a $30 million campus fundraising project, that he could get the McGugin Center built and called on his friends among those the late Alf Sharpe, to help him. This actually started all the improvements of the football facilities at the university. Jess had a very special way with people.

=== Legacy ===
In 1999, he was ranked 39th on Sports Illustrated's list of the 50 greatest Tennessee sports figures of the 20th century.

The street directly south of both the football and baseball stadiums at Vanderbilt is named Jess Neely Drive in his honor.

== Head coaching record ==
=== Football ===
Year	Team	Overall	Conference	Standing	Bowl/playoffs	Coaches^{#}	AP^{°}
Southwestern Lynx (Independent) (1924–1927)
1924	Southwestern	3–6					
1925	Southwestern	7–2					
1926	Southwestern	5–4–1					
1927	Southwestern	5–5–1					
Southwestern:		20–17–2					
Clemson Tigers (Southern Conference) (1931–1939)
1931	Clemson	1–6–2	1–4	20th			
1932	Clemson	3–5–1	0–4	T–21st			
1933	Clemson	3–6–2	1–1	T–5th			
1934	Clemson	5–4	2–1	5th			
1935	Clemson	6–3	2–1	4th			
1936	Clemson	5–5	3–3	8th			
1937	Clemson	4–4–1	2–0–1	T–3rd			
1938	Clemson	7–1–1	3–0–1	2nd			
1939	Clemson	9–1	4–0	2nd	W Cotton		12
Clemson:		43–35–7	18–14–2				
Rice Owls (Southwest Conference) (1940–1966)
1940	Rice	7–3	4–2	T–3rd			
1941	Rice	6–3–1	3–2–1	4th			
1942	Rice	7–2–1	4–1–1	2nd			
1943	Rice	3–7	2–3	T–3rd			
1944	Rice	5–6	2–3	T–4th			
1945	Rice	5–6	3–3	T–3rd			
1946	Rice	9–2	5–1	T–1st	W Orange		10
1947	Rice	6–3–1	4–2	3rd			18
1948	Rice	5–4–1	3–2–1	T–3rd			
1949	Rice	10–1	6–0	1st	W Cotton		5
1950	Rice	6–4	2–4	T–5th			
1951	Rice	5–5	3–3	T–3rd			
1952	Rice	5–5	4–2	2nd			
1953	Rice	9–2	5–1	T–1st	W Cotton	6	6
1954	Rice	7–3	4–2	T–3rd		19	19
1955	Rice	2–7–1	0–6	7th			
1956	Rice	4–6	1–5	5th			
1957	Rice	7–4	5–1	1st	L Cotton	7	8
1958	Rice	5–5	4–2	T–2nd			
1959	Rice	1–7–2	1–4–1	6th			
1960	Rice	7–4	5–2	T–2nd	L Sugar		
1961	Rice	7–4	5–2	3rd	L Bluebonnet		
1962	Rice	2–6–2	2–4–1	6th			
1963	Rice	6–4	4–3	3rd			
1964	Rice	4–5–1	3–3–1	T–4th			
1965	Rice	2–8	1–6	T–7th			
1966	Rice	2–8	1–6	8th			
Rice:		144–124–10	86–75–6				
Total:		207–176–19					
National championship Conference title Conference division title or championship game berth
^{#}Rankings from final Coaches Poll.; ^{°}Rankings from final AP Poll.

== See also ==
- List of college football career coaching wins leaders

== Bibliography ==
- Baker, Louis Henry (1945). Football:Facts and Figures.
- Pittard, Homer (1961). The First Fifty Years: A History of Middle Tennessee State College.
- Pope, Edwin (1955). Football's Greatest Coaches – via archive.org.
- Russell, Fred (1938). Fifty Years of Vanderbilt Football. Nashville, TN.
- Traughber, William L. (2011). Vanderbilt Football: Tales of Commodore Gridiron History. Charleston, SC. ISBN 9781609494230.
- Vanderbilt University (2012). 2012 Vanderbilt Football Fact Book.
- Walsh, Christopher J. (2006). Where Football Is King: A History of the SEC. Taylor Trade. ISBN 9781461734772.
