= Gilbert v. Derwinski =

- Court: United States Court of Appeals for Veterans Claims
- Decided: October 12, 1990
- Citation: 1 Vet. App. 49 (1990)

Case history
- Appealed from: Board of Veterans' Appeals

Court membership
- Judges sitting: Nebeker (Chief Judge), Kramer (Associate Judge), and Farley (Associate Judge)

Gilbert v. Derwinski is a United States Court of Appeals for Veterans Claims case that dealt with the "benefit of the doubt" rule in veterans law.

== Background ==
Mr. Norman Gilbert was claiming service connection for a back injury. Specifically, he claimed that he injured his back while falling with a machine gun in his arms while serving in Korea in 1956. The Board of Veterans' Appeals (BVA) upheld the denial of the back condition, stating that any residual back injury that occurred during service was acute and transitory in nature. BVA also held that the benefit of the doubt rule did not apply to this case.

== Analysis ==
In this decision, the Court compared and contrasted the various burden of proof against the "benefit of the doubt" rule. In criminal law, the burden of proof used is beyond a reasonable doubt. Next in the spectrum would be clear and convincing evidence, followed by the "fair preponderance" standard used in civil litigation. Last in stringency order would be the "reasonable doubt standard" which is defined regulatorily as:

It is the defined and consistently applied policy of the Department of Veterans Affairs to administer the law under a broad interpretation, consistent, however, with the facts shown in every case. When, after careful consideration of all procurable and assembled data, a reasonable doubt arises regarding service origin, the degree of disability, or any other point, such doubt will be resolved in favor of the claimant. By reasonable doubt is meant one which exists because of an approximate balance of positive and negative evidence which does not satisfactorily prove or disprove the claim. It is a substantial doubt and one within the range of probability as distinguished from pure speculation or remote possibility. It is not a means of reconciling actual conflict or a contradiction in the evidence. Mere suspicion or doubt as to the truth of any statements submitted, as distinguished from impeachment or contradiction by evidence or known facts, is not justifiable basis for denying the application of the reasonable doubt doctrine if the entire, complete record otherwise warrants invoking this doctrine. The reasonable doubt doctrine is also applicable even in the absence of official records, particularly if the basic incident allegedly arose under combat, or similarly strenuous conditions, and is consistent with the probable results of such known hardships. (emphasis added)

The Court, in explaining how this applies to the weighing of evidence in Veterans claims, used a rule used in baseball sandlot folklore that the tie goes to the runner. In other words, when the evidentiary value of the negative evidence against the Veteran's claim is the same as the evidentiary value of the positive evidence for the Veteran's claim, reasonable doubt is resolved in favor of the Veteran.

In applying this rule to Mr. Gilbert's claim, the Court noted that BVA had not provided adequate reasons and bases, or a legal explanation in its decision, as to why the benefit of the doubt rule did not apply to the claim. Since there were insufficient reasons and bases, the claim was remanded back to BVA for a new decision.

== Decision ==
The Court remanded the claim back to BVA for a new decision detailing why the Veteran was not entitled to the benefit of the doubt under the law.
