= Delmas Gooch =

American football player (1905–1968)

Profile
- Position: End

Personal information
- Born: March 10, 1905; Patterson, Louisiana
- Died: December 1968

Career information
- College: Sewanee (1924–1925)

Awards and highlights
- Porter Cup (1926); All-time Sewanee team

Robert Delmas "Del" Gooch (March 10, 1905 – December 1968) was a college football player.

== Sewanee ==
Gooch was a prominent end for the Sewanee Tigers football teams of Sewanee: The University of the South. At Sewanee he was a member of Sigma Alpha Epsilon. He was picked for an all-time Sewanee team, which noted how Gooch would "slash through enemy interference to tackle his man viciously." In his senior year, Gooch was awarded the Porter Cup of the Porter Clothing Company as his university's best all-around athlete. He also appears on Billy Evans's "Southern Honor Roll."
