= Norris Cup =

North Carolina athletics award

- Awarded for: "best all-around athlete" at a major university.
- Location: North Carolina
- Country: United States
- Presented by: Norris Candy Company

The Norris Cup was a trophy awarded by the Norris Candy Company to the best all around athlete at several North Carolina colleges. Jack McDowall won it twice.

== List of trophy winners ==
The following is a list of winners.

| Year | North Carolina | NC State |
|---|---|---|
| 1924 | | Red Johnson |
| 1925 | | Red Lassiter |
| 1926 | | Charlie and Walter Shuford |
| 1927 | Red Whisnant | Jack McDowall |
| 1928 | | Jack McDowall |
| 1929 | | Frank Goodwin |
| 1930 | | Maurice Johnson |

== See also ==
- Porter Cup
