= George H. Barker =

American football athlete and coach (1901–1986)

Profile
- Position: Quarterback

Personal information
- Born: 1901; Falling Water, Tennessee, U.S.
- Died: April 23, 1986 (aged 85)

Career information
- College: Sewanee (1922–1925)

Awards and highlights
- Tennessee Sports Hall of Fame (1983); Porter Cup (1925)

George H. "Zaney" Barker (1901 – April 23, 1986) was an athlete and coach, inducted into the Tennessee Sports Hall of Fame in 1983.

== Early life ==
Barker was born near Falling Water, Tennessee and attended Baylor School. Dr. Guerry persuaded Barker to enter Sewanee: The University of the South.

=== Sewanee ===
Barker played football, basketball, baseball, and golf. He played for the Sewanee Tigers football team as a quarterback from 1922 to 1925, and was captain of the 1925 team. The high-point of his football career was the defeat of Vanderbilt in 1924. He won the Porter Cup in 1925.

== Coaching career ==
Barker returned in 1926 to the Baylor School as a member of the coaching staff and a teacher.
