= Byrd Douglas =

American football/baseball coach and judge

Biographical details
- Born: August 28, 1894; Nashville, Tennessee, U.S.
- Died: August 11, 1965 (aged 70); Wilson County, Tennessee, U.S.

Playing career

Baseball
- 1915–1916: Princeton
- Position: Catcher

Coaching career (HC unless noted)

Football
- 1922: Cumberland (TN)

Baseball
- 1920–1921: Vanderbilt
- 1928–1930: Princeton

Administrative career (AD unless noted)
- 1922: Cumberland (TN)

Accomplishments and honors

Awards
- Cumberland Athletics Hall of Fame

Byrd Douglas (August 28, 1894 – August 11, 1965) was an American college baseball and football coach as well as a judge.

== Early years ==
Douglas was born on August 28, 1894, in Nashville, Tennessee to William "Byrd" Douglas and Adelaide "Addie" Wharton Gaines. He attended Wallace University School of Nashville, Tennessee and Vanderbilt University. Douglas attended Vanderbilt in 1911 and 1912. He then attended Princeton University and was a star catcher on the baseball team.

== Coaching career ==
Douglas coached the 1921 Southern Intercollegiate Athletic Association (SIAA) champion Vanderbilt Commodores baseball team. The Vanderbilt yearbook claimed the season's success was "due almost entirely to one man," namely Douglas. Douglas was athletic director and football and baseball coach at Cumberland University in Lebanon, Tennessee the year after. That same year he wrote The Science of Baseball. He was inducted into the Cumberland Athletics Hall of Fame in 1991.

== Legal and writing career ==
Douglas was also a judge. Upon retirement he was designated Chairman Emeritus of the Conference of Trial Judges of Davidson County, Tennessee. Douglas wrote the book Steamboatin' On The Cumberland in December 1961.
