= Willis McCabe =

American athlete (1897–1960)

Tennessee Volunteers
- Position: Quarterback

Personal information
- Born: July 19, 1897; Topeka, Kansas, U.S.
- Died: August 14, 1960 (aged 63); Memphis, Tennessee, U.S.

Career information
- College: Tennessee (1919–1920)

Willis Beaumont McCabe (July 19, 1897 – August 14, 1960) was a college football, baseball, and basketball player for the Tennessee Volunteers of the University of Tennessee. He won the Porter Cup and was the quarterback on the football team. He played Minor League Baseball.
