= Bill Coughlan =

American football player, track athlete, and coach

Biographical details
- Born: 1899
- Died: July 5, 1952; Chattanooga, Tennessee

Playing career

Football
- 1920–1922: Sewanee
- Positions: Halfback, quarterback

Coaching career (HC unless noted)

Track
- 1930–1931: Chattanooga

Accomplishments and honors

Awards
- Porter Cup (1920); Sewanee Athletic Hall of Fame; 2nd-team All-time Sewanee football team

William M. Coughlan (1899 – July 5, 1952) was an American college football player and track athlete and coach. He played football and ran track at Sewanee: The University of the South and was inducted into the school's sports hall of fame in 2005. Coughlan was a halfback and quarterback on the Sewanee Tigers football team and captain of the 1920 squad. He returned an interception 70 yards for a touchdown against Alabama in 1922. He was second-team on the all-time Sewanee football team. Coughlan coached track at the University of Chattanooga in 1930, and later coached at Notre Dame prep.
