= Red Barron =

American football and baseball player (1900–1982)

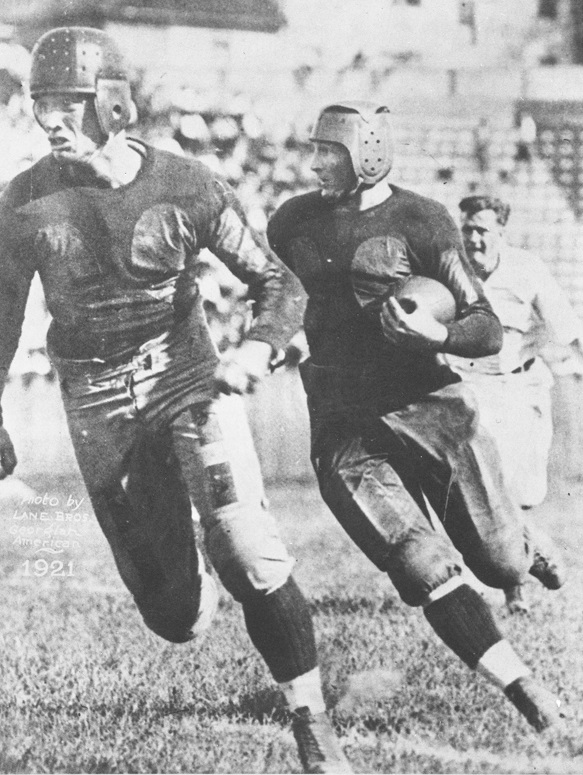
- Barron running behind Judy Harlan

Profile
- Position: Halfback

Personal information
- Born: June 21, 1900; Clarkesville, Georgia, U.S.
- Died: October 4, 1982 (aged 82); Atlanta, Georgia, U.S.
- Listed height: 5 ft 11 in (1.80 m)
- Listed weight: 180 lb (82 kg)

Career information
- College: Georgia Tech (1918–1922)

Awards and highlights
- 3× SoCon championship (1920, 1921, 1922); Second-team All-American (1922); 4× All-Southern (1919, 1920, 1921, 1922); 2× All-Southern (baseball) (1921, 1922); Tech All-Era Team (William Alexander Era); Georgia Tech Athletics Hall of Fame; Georgia Sports Hall of Fame

David Irenus "Red" Barron (June 21, 1900 – October 4, 1982) was an American football and baseball player. Barron was a three-sport letterwinner at the Georgia Institute of Technology. In football, he was named second or third team All American twice, first-team All-Southern four times, and was an inductee to Tech's Hall of Fame and the Georgia Sports Hall of Fame. He was also twice an All-Southern baseball player at Tech. His brother was Carter Barron.

== Georgia Tech ==
Barron was a prominent halfback for John Heisman and Bill Alexander's Georgia Tech Golden Tornado football teams of the Georgia Institute of Technology from 1918 to 1922. Former Tech fullback Sam Murray, who played as a substitute for later Tech back Doug Wycoff, was asked about a certain strong runner in the 1930s, "He's good. But if I were playing again, I would have one wish – never to see bearing down upon me a more fearsome picture of power than Judy Harlan blocking for Red Barron."

Barron led the 1921 football team in scoring and rushed for 1,459 yards during the season, a school record at the time. He also made All-Southern as an outfielder on the baseball team.

During the Cocking affair, Eugene Talmadge attempted to place Barron in a new position as vice president of his alma mater; the move was widely criticized by Georgia Tech alumni, and Barron subsequently declined to accept the position.

== Professional sports ==
=== Football ===
Barron played with a group of all-star collegians representing Coral Gables against Red Grange's traveling Chicago Bears. NFL league president Joseph Carr chose Barron for his All-star team of 1925.

=== Baseball ===
Red Barron
- Left fielder
- Batted: Left Threw: Right

MLB debut
- June 10, 1929, for the Boston Braves

Last MLB appearance
- July 7, 1929, for the Boston Braves

MLB statistics
- Batting average: .190
- Home runs: 0
- Runs batted in: 1
- Stats at Baseball Reference

Teams
- Boston Braves (1929)

Barron then played baseball professionally with the Boston Braves in 1929.

== High school football ==
He later became a high school football coach. Barron coached for Monroe A&M from 1924 to 1938 with 66 wins, 48 losses and 9 ties, Dacula High School, Rabun County, and Clayton high schools.

== See also ==
- List of Georgia Tech Yellow Jackets starting quarterbacks
