= Tie goes to the runner =

Term used in baseball

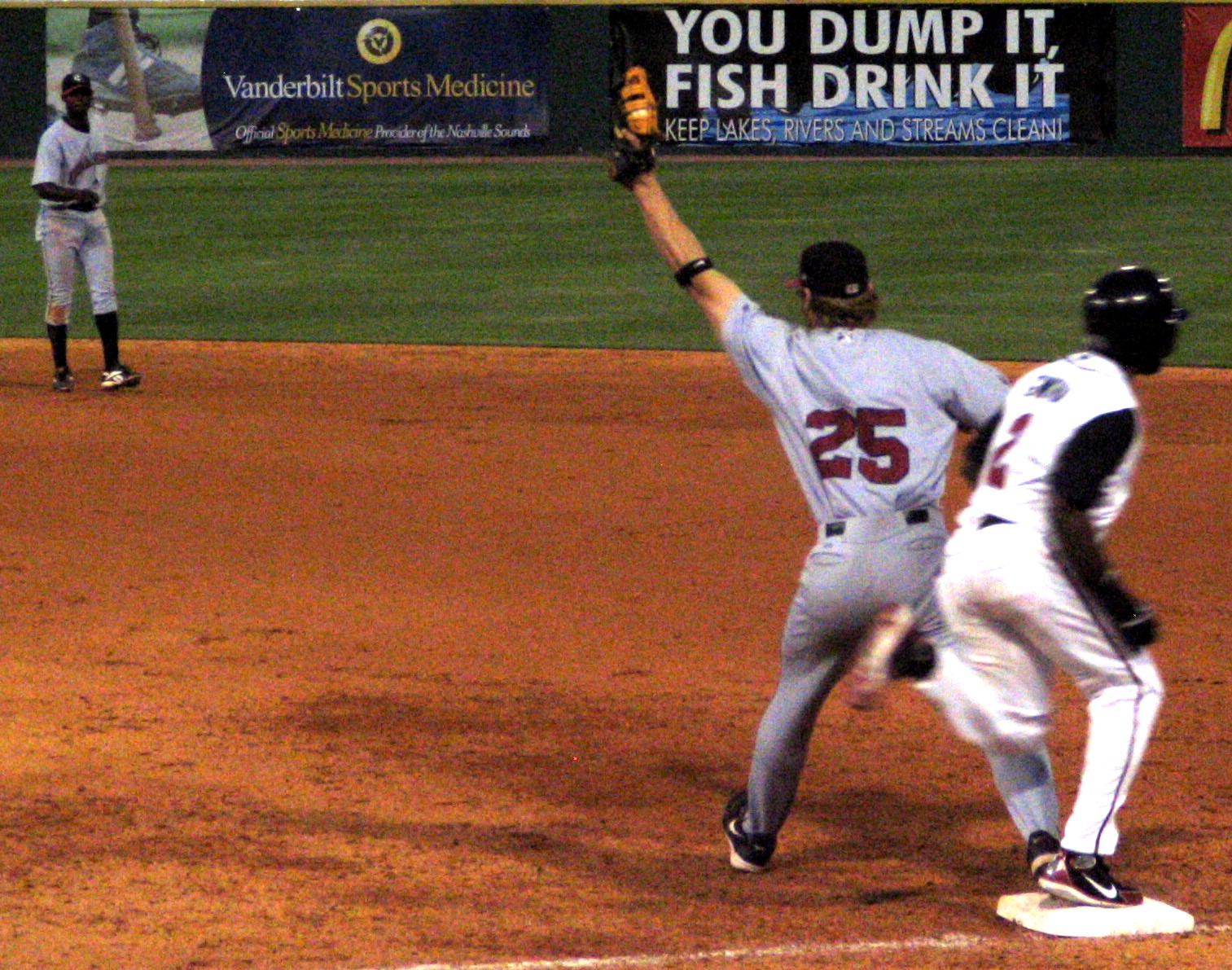
A close play at first base

Tie goes to the runner is a popular interpretation of informal baseball rules, according to which a forced base runner is considered safe when they reach the next base at the same time as a fielder carrying the ball does. Umpires reject the concept that baseball provides for such a tie to occur and instead rule on the basis that either the player or the ball reached the base first.

The wording of rule 5.09(a)(10), formerly 6.05(j), of the Official Baseball Rules is that a batter is out when "After a third strike or after he hits a fair ball, he or first base is tagged before he touches first base". The rule only covers the situation where the base (or player) is tagged before the runner touches the base, in which case the runner is out. Because no other situation is mentioned, any other situation, like the player being tagged after he touches first base or the base or player not being tagged at all, the runner is safe by default, since the condition of "making an out" has not been satisfied. Supporters of the "tie goes to the runner" claim argue that they learned the phrase in backyards as toddlers, thus so-called "ties" should also be counted among these cases and not count as an out.

In response to a question from a Little League umpire, Major League Baseball umpire Tim McClelland has written that the concept of a tie at a base does not exist, and that a runner either beats the ball or does not. In 2009, umpire Mark Dewdeny, a contributor for Bleacher Report, citing McClelland, also rejected the idea of a tie, and further commented that even if a "physicist couldn't make an argument one way or the other" from watching an instant replay, the runner would still be out.
