= Dooch Sherman =

American football quarterback

Profile
- Position: Quarterback

Personal information
- Listed height: 5 ft 9 in (1.75 m)
- Listed weight: 144 lb (65 kg)

Career information
- College: Vanderbilt (1917–1919)

Awards and highlights
- Porter Cup (1919)

N. W. "Dooch" Sherman was a college football and basketball player. He was a prominent quarterback for the Vanderbilt Commodores football team, the inaugural winner of the Porter Cup as the school's best all-around athlete.
