= Porter Cup (trophy) =

College football award

- Awarded for: "Best all-around athlete" at a major university.
- Location: Southern United States
- Country: United States
- Presented by: Porter Clothing Company

The Porter Cup was a sterling silver loving cup trophy once awarded by the Porter Clothing Company to the best all-around athlete from a major southern university, including the University of Alabama, Birmingham–Southern College, Tulane and Tennessee's three major universities: Vanderbilt, Sewanee and Tennessee. The three in Tennessee were given by Alf Porter, and Alabama's was given by Henry Porter Loving. Alabama's is thus also called the "Porter Loving Cup".

== List of trophy winners ==
The following is an incomplete list of winners since the award started shortly after the First World War:

Year	Alabama	Auburn	Birmingham-Southern	Howard	Tulane	Vanderbilt	Sewanee	Tennessee	VMI
1918			Mike Slovensky	Claude Carr					
1919		Charles Scott		James Shelley Jackson		Dooch Sherman		Frank Callaway	
1920	Riggs Stephenson	Ed Sherling				Josh Cody	Bill Coughlan		
1921	Al Clemens	Ed Sherling	Aubrey A. Miller			Julian Thomas	Charles Satterlee	Willis McCabe	
1922	Al Clemens	Ed Sherling	Aubrey A. Miller			Thomas Ryan	Blood Miller	Roe Campbell	
1923	Clyde Propst	Ed Sherling	Milton Griffin			Doc Kuhn			
1924	Clyde Propst		O. Stanton Gandy		Ellis Henican	Gil Reese			
1925	Clyde Propst		Red Farr		Lester Lautenschlaeger		George H. Barker		
1926			Jake Hall		Eddie Morgan		Delmas Gooch		
1927	Ray Pepper	Forest James	Edgar Lott				Orin Helvey	John Barnhill	
1928		William Everett James	Shorty Ogle		Johnny Menville	Charles Malcom Moss			
1929	Earle Smith		John King	Sam Bradley					Virgil Grow
1930					Wop Glover				Roy Franklin Dunn
1931									
1932		Shug Jordan					Daniel Ward Phillips, Jr		

== See also ==
- Norris Cup
