= Myles P. O'Connor =

American football quarterback

Profile
- Position: Quarterback

Career information
- College: Vanderbilt (1895–1896)

Myles P. O'Connor was an American college football player. He was a quarterback for the Vanderbilt Commodores football team from 1895 to 1896. One of the highest honors that a student could achieve was the "Bachelor of Ugliness;" O'Connor won this award in 1897.
