= Bachelor of Ugliness =

The Bachelor of Ugliness was a title conferred onto Vanderbilt University's most popular male undergraduate. One of the highest honors that a student could achieve, it was given to the male undergraduate student believed to be most representative of ideal young manhood and the class's most popular member, devised by William H. Dodd, a professor, in 1885.

== List of recipients ==
Year	Recipient
1885	T. P. Branch
1886	Benjamin G. Waller
1887	A. E. Clement/R. E. Crockett (tie vote)
1888	Frank Taylor
1889	Jeff McCarn
1890	V. S. Roenborough
1891	Horace E. Bemis
1892	J. A. Robins
1893	R. W. Clawson
1894	W. W. Craig
1895	W. R. Hendrix
1896	H. N. Pharr
1897	Myles P. O'Connor
1898	Phil Connell
1899	S. V. Gardner
1900	W. A. White
1901	F. S. Palmer
1902	John Edgerton
1903	B. F. Carr
1904	Ben Clary
1905	E. B. Tucker
1906	Ed Hamilton
1907	A. M. Souby
1908	Bob Blake
1909	N. T. Dowling (Elected, but resigned)
1910	Bruce McGehee
1911	John W. Bull
1912	Ray Morrison
1913	Bruce Wade
1914	Enoch Brown
1915	Tom Brown
1916	Irby Curry
1917	Pope Shannon
1918	Ammie Sikes
1919	Chas R. Richardson
1920	Manning Brown
1921	Grailey Berryhill
1922	Scotty Neill
1923	Jess Neely
1924	Unknown
1925	Gil Reese
1928	Bill Spears
1929	Charlie Hawkins
1930	Paul McGaughey
1937	David Mayson
1938	Carl Hinkle
1939	Charles Majors
1968	Lee Barfield
1970	Perry Wallace
