= C. Ellis Henican =

American lawyer and athlete (1905–1997)

- Born: February 10, 1905; New Orleans, Louisiana, U.S.
- Died: February 23, 1997 (aged 92); New Orleans, Louisiana, U.S.
- Occupation: lawyer

Caswell Ellis Henican (February 10, 1905 – February 23, 1997) was an American lawyer and an athlete for the Tulane Green Wave. As a football, basketball, and baseball player he was inducted into the Tulane Athletics Hall of Fame. He won the Porter Cup. He played as a running back on the football team. He is the father of Peggy Wilson.
