= Johnny Menville =

American football player and physician

No. 99
- Position: Quarterback / Halfback

Personal information
- Born: June 24, 1907; Houma, Louisiana
- Died: May 27, 1996 (aged 88); New Orleans, Louisiana

Career information
- High school: Jesuit
- College: Tulane (1926–1928)

Awards and highlights
- All-Southern (1927); Porter Cup (1928)

John Gilmer Menville (June 24, 1907 – May 27, 1996) was an American college football player, professor and physician. He was a quarterback for the Tulane Green Wave football team from 1926 to 1928. Menville was selected All-Southern by some writers in 1927. He won the Porter Cup as his university's best athlete in 1928.

He was also a professor of urology, and a urologist who performed the first kidney transplant in the South.
