= Freddy Sale =

American baseball player (1902–1956)

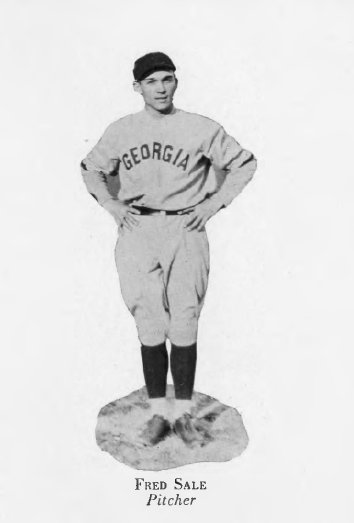
- 1923 yearbook photo, University of Georgia
- Pitcher
- Born: May 2, 1902; Chester, South Carolina, U.S.
- Died: May 27, 1956 (aged 54); Hermosa Beach, California, U.S.
- Batted: Right Threw: Right

MLB debut
- June 30, 1924, for the Pittsburgh Pirates

Last MLB appearance
- June 30, 1924, for the Pittsburgh Pirates

MLB statistics
- Innings pitched: 1.0
- Earned run average: 0.00
- Strikeouts: 0
- Stats at Baseball Reference

Teams
- Pittsburgh Pirates (1924)

Frederick Link Sale (May 2, 1902 – May 27, 1956) was an American right-handed pitcher who appeared in one game in for the Pittsburgh Pirates in 1924. He was a native of Chester, South Carolina.

He attended the University of Georgia where he was a member of the Sigma Chi fraternity. He lettered in baseball as a pitcher from 1922 to 1924. He pitched a one-hitter against Oglethorpe University in 1922. In 1923 he tossed a perfect game against the University of Virginia.

On June 30, 1924, Sale came in to pitch the bottom of the 8th inning of a road game that the Pirates lost to the St. Louis Cardinals 7–5. Facing just four batters, he allowed two hits but no runs in his one inning of work. His lifetime ERA stands at 0.00.

Sale died at the age of 54 in Hermosa Beach, California.
