= Slim Embry =

American baseball player (1901–1947)

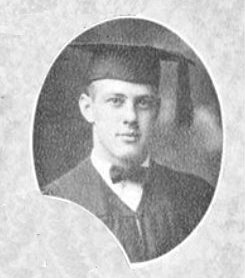
- Pitcher
- Born: August 17, 1901; Columbia, Tennessee
- Died: October 10, 1947 (aged 46); Belle Meade, Tennessee
- Batted: Right Threw: Right

MLB debut
- October 1, 1923, for the Chicago White Sox

Last MLB appearance
- October 1, 1923, for the Chicago White Sox

MLB statistics
- Win–loss record: 0–0
- Earned run average: 10.12
- Strikeouts: 1
- Stats at Baseball Reference

Teams
- Chicago White Sox (1923)

Charles Akin Embry (August 17, 1901 – October 10, 1947), was a Major League Baseball pitcher who played in 1923 with the Chicago White Sox. He batted and threw right-handed. Slim played baseball for the Vanderbilt Commodores from 1921 to 1923. The Commodores were champions of the Southern Intercollegiate Athletic Association in 1921, and Slim was captain of the team in 1923. He was also a member of the basketball team in 1921–1922 and 1922–1923. Embry graduated from Vanderbilt with a degree in law in 1923.

== Early years ==
Embry was born on August 17, 1901, in Columbia, Tennessee, to Wiley Bridges Embry and Alma Williamson. Embry attended Central High School in Nashville, Tennessee.

== College baseball ==
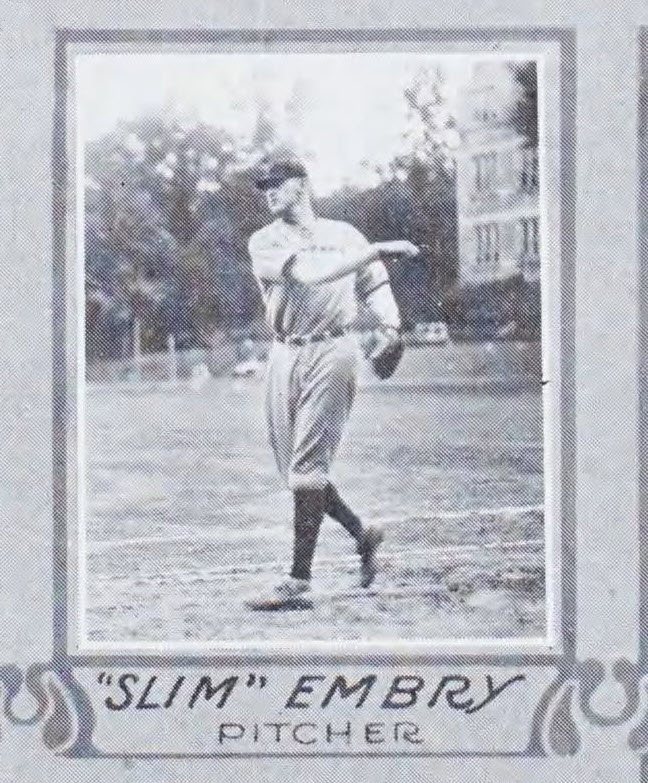
Embry pitching for the Vandetbilt college team, circa 1923

Embry was a prominent member of Vanderbilt Commodores baseball teams which won a 1921 SIAA title. Embry was considered the team's best pitcher, posting a record of 9–3.

== College basketball ==
Slim was a center on the Vanderbilt Commodores basketball team. Vanderbilt's yearbook The Commodore in 1922 mentions "This elongated individual of diamond fame played spasmodically at the tip-off role, occasionally displaying brilliant passing and accurate shooting, and at other times warranting the remark "As a basketball player, Slim Embry's an All-American pitcher."

== Later years ==
Embry died of tuberculosis on October 10, 1947, in Belle Meade, Tennessee.
