= Tot McCullough =

American football and baseball player (1895–1963)

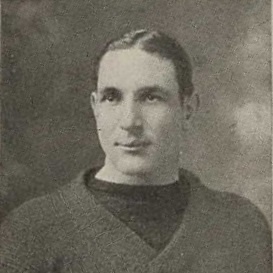
- McCullough in 1922

No. 22
- Positions: End, tackle

Personal information
- Born: May 20, 1895; Lewisburg, Tennessee, U.S.
- Died: September 1963 (aged 67–68); Nashville, Tennessee, U.S.
- Listed height: 6 ft 4 in (1.93 m)
- Listed weight: 180 lb (82 kg)

Career information
- College: Vanderbilt (1920–1922)

Awards and highlights
- All-Southern (1921); SIAA championship (1921); SoCon championship (1922); SIAA championship (baseball) (1921)

Claude Royal "Tot" McCullough (May 20, 1895 – September 1963) was an American football and baseball player for the Vanderbilt Commodores of Vanderbilt University. He was a member of the Delta Tau Delta fraternity. McCullough was noted for his size, given epithets such as "gigantic" and "Huge Tot McCullough."

== Vanderbilt University ==
=== Football ===
"Tot" was an end and tackle on Dan McGugin's Vanderbilt Commodores football teams which won two conferences titles in 1921 and 1922.

==== 1921 ====
He was selected All-Southern by Fuzzy Woodruff.

==== 1922 ====
McCullough was a starter for the scoreless tie with the Michigan Wolverines at the dedication of Dudley Field. Harry Kipke in recalling that game said "I picked myself up very, very painfully from every blade of grass in the place. It seems to me I spent most of the afternoon flat of my back and if I saw McCullough, their big end, on the street tomorrow, I'd start climbing a tree." He may have been the player to stop Kipke on the goal line by bracing against the goal post during the game, as he mentioned doing such once. Walter Camp praised Tot's run defense. McCullough was also on the receiving end of Vanderbilt's only offensive play of note that day, a 20-odd yard pass from captain Jess Neely.

McCullough was ruled ineligible for the 1923 football season. Those who played for baseball in the South Georgia league, or any other unrecognized one, were disallowed from participating in varsity athletics in the Southern Conference. Tot had played with the Albany club.

=== Baseball ===
McCullough was a first baseman and outfielder for the Vanderbilt Commodores baseball team, including a 1921 SIAA championship.

==== 1921 ====
Vanderbilt's yearbook The Commodore states that in a 1921 game against Southwestern Presbyterian University, the team achieved a world record in scoring 13 runs in one inning, after two men were out. The Tennessean recalls the event: "Neely singled as did Kuhn; Neil fanned but Thomas got his third straight hit and both tallied. Big Tot got hit by a pitched ball and Smith was safe on a fielder's choice with one out. Woodruf flied out to right. Tyner slammed one to center which Jetty juggled and everybody advanced a pair of sacks. Ryan was safe on another error and two runs came over. Neely beat out his second hit of the inning and Kuhn walked. Neil walked. Thomas was safe on an error and Big Tot McCullough picked one over the right field fence, clearing the sacks—but oh, what's the use? Why continue?"
