= Charlie Gibson (1920s catcher) =

American baseball player (1899–1990)

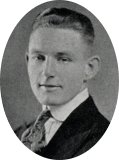
- Catcher
- Born: November 21, 1899; LaGrange, Georgia, U.S.
- Died: December 18, 1990 (aged 91); LaGrange, Georgia, U.S.
- Batted: Right Threw: Right

MLB debut
- May 30, 1924, for the Philadelphia Athletics

Last MLB appearance
- August 29, 1924, for the Philadelphia Athletics

MLB statistics
- Batting average: .133
- Home runs: 0
- Runs batted in: 1
- Stats at Baseball Reference

Teams
- Philadelphia Athletics (1924)

Charles Griffin Gibson (November 21, 1899 – December 18, 1990) was an American Major League baseball player for the Philadelphia Athletics.

Gibson was born in LaGrange, Georgia, and attended Alabama Polytechnic Institute. He was head football coach at Auburn High School for the 1923 season, leading the team to a 6–0 record. In 1924, he played his only season of Major League ball, participating in 12 games as a catcher for the Philadelphia Athletics.
