= Fielder's choice =

Play in baseball

In baseball, fielder's choice (abbreviated FC) refers to a variety of plays involving an offensive player reaching a base due to the defense's attempt to put out another baserunner, or the defensive team's indifference to his advance. Fielder's choice is not called by the umpires on the field of play; rather, it is recorded by the official scorer to account for the offensive player's advance without crediting him with an offensive statistic such as a hit or stolen base.

Though there are several definitions of fielder's choice, the most common (and the only one commonly referred to as FC) involves a fielder fielding a fair ball and choosing to try to put out another baserunner, thereby allowing the batter-runner to safely reach first base. This could be because the defensive player believes they do not have a reasonable prospect of preventing the batter-runner from reaching first base safely, but is usually because it is typically more beneficial for the defensive team to prevent another baserunner from advancing closer to home plate or scoring a run. If another runner is retired on a force out, the batter will not be rewarded with a hit and will be scored a fielder's choice (FC). Other plays that fall under the definition of FC are usually referred to using other terms such as "defensive indifference" or "on the throw."

== Definition ==
Fielder's choice is defined in MLB Rule 2, "Definitions", as "the act of a fielder who handles a fair grounder and, instead of throwing to first base to put out the batter-runner, throws to another base in an attempt to put out a preceding runner." FC is recorded for the batter-runner if he reaches first base safely regardless of whether the attempt to put out the other runner(s) is successful. If the other runner is successfully put out for the third out, FC is recorded for the batter-runner regardless of whether he had already reached first base (if the other runner was forced out, the batter is described as grounding into a force play).

Rule 2 also defines FC as any of the following circumstances:

- When a batter accomplishes a hit but is able to safely reach an extra base because of the defense's attempt to put out another baserunner (e.g., one running towards home plate). Often called on the throw.
- When a runner already on base safely reaches another base due to a fielder's attempt to put out another runner, unless his advance can be categorized as a stolen base. Also referred to as on the throw.

In many situations fielder's choice requires the official scorer to make judgment calls, such as what the outcome of the play would have been had there been no runners on base after taking into account ordinary effort by the defensive team, as well as what effect any errors committed by the defensive team might have had on the play.

=== Impact on statistics ===
A batter who reaches first base safely as the result of a fielder's choice is not credited with a hit or a time on base; however, his turn at the plate is recorded as an at bat and plate appearance. Therefore, a player's batting average and on-base percentage decrease as a result of reaching first base via fielder's choice.

A batter who reaches first base safely but advances on the same play as the result of fielder's choice is credited with a hit for the number of bases he would have reached safely with no other runners on base, and is said to have taken the additional base(s) on the throw.

A baserunner who makes an undefended steal is not credited with a stolen base, but his advance is accounted for as defensive indifference.

== Examples of fielder's choice situations ==
- With a runner on first base, the batter hits a ground ball directly to the shortstop. Although he could easily throw the batter-runner out at first base, the shortstop chooses to throw to the second baseman who is covering second base, in an attempt to force out the runner advancing from first. Meanwhile, the batter-runner reaches first base safely.
  - This play is commonly referred to as "grounding into a force out". Fielder's choice is recorded for the batter-runner (6-4 or 6-4-3, depending on whether an attempt was made to put him out), and he is not credited with a hit.
  - A 6-4 FC would be recorded if the preceding runner is put out for the third out, regardless of where the batter-runner is on the basepaths when this occurs.
- With a runner on second base, the batter sends a base hit to the outfield. The outfielder, playing shallow in anticipation of such a hit, throws to home plate in an attempt to put out the runner trying to score. The batter-runner may decide to advance to second base since he can see that there will not be a play there. This play is scored as a single for the batter-runner regardless of the outcome of the attempt to put out the runner trying to score. The term on the throw is often used to describe the outcome of any plays in this situation.
  - If the batter-runner safely reaches second base regardless of the outcome at home plate, his single still stands, but he is said to have taken second on the throw, or on fielder's choice.
  - If the batter-runner is thrown out at second base regardless of the outcome at home plate, he is still credited with a single, since the put out was a consequence of his attempt to take second on the throw.
  - If the runner attempting to score is put out, he is said to be out at home plate on the throw. If he is put out for the third out, no advance on the throw is recorded for the batter-runner, and the batter-runner is left on base since he is credited with a single.
- With a runner on first base, the batter hits a ground ball back up the middle. The shortstop dives for the ball and saves it from going into center field. Realizing he has no time to throw out the batter-runner at first base, the shortstop tosses the ball to the second baseman covering second base in an attempt to force out the runner coming from first. However, the throw is not in time, and both runners are safe. Assuming the official scorer agrees the shortstop could not have thrown the batter-runner out at first with ordinary effort, this play will be scored as a base hit and not FC.
- With the bases loaded and two outs, the batter takes a called strike or swings and misses at a pitch with two strikes; however, the catcher fumbles or misses the catch. Under the uncaught 3rd strike rule, the batter is obliged to run to first base and all baserunners are compelled to attempt to advance one base to accommodate the batter-runner. The catcher retrieves the ball and steps on home plate, achieving a force play on the baserunner who was on third base when the play began. The play is both a strikeout and a fielder's choice. If the pitcher must run to home plate to field a throw of a third-strike pitch that a catcher first fumbled and catches the ball and touches home plate before the runner from third base reaches home plate safely, then the play is a fielder's choice (2-1) as well as a strikeout.
