= Safe (baseball) =

Reaching a base safely in baseball

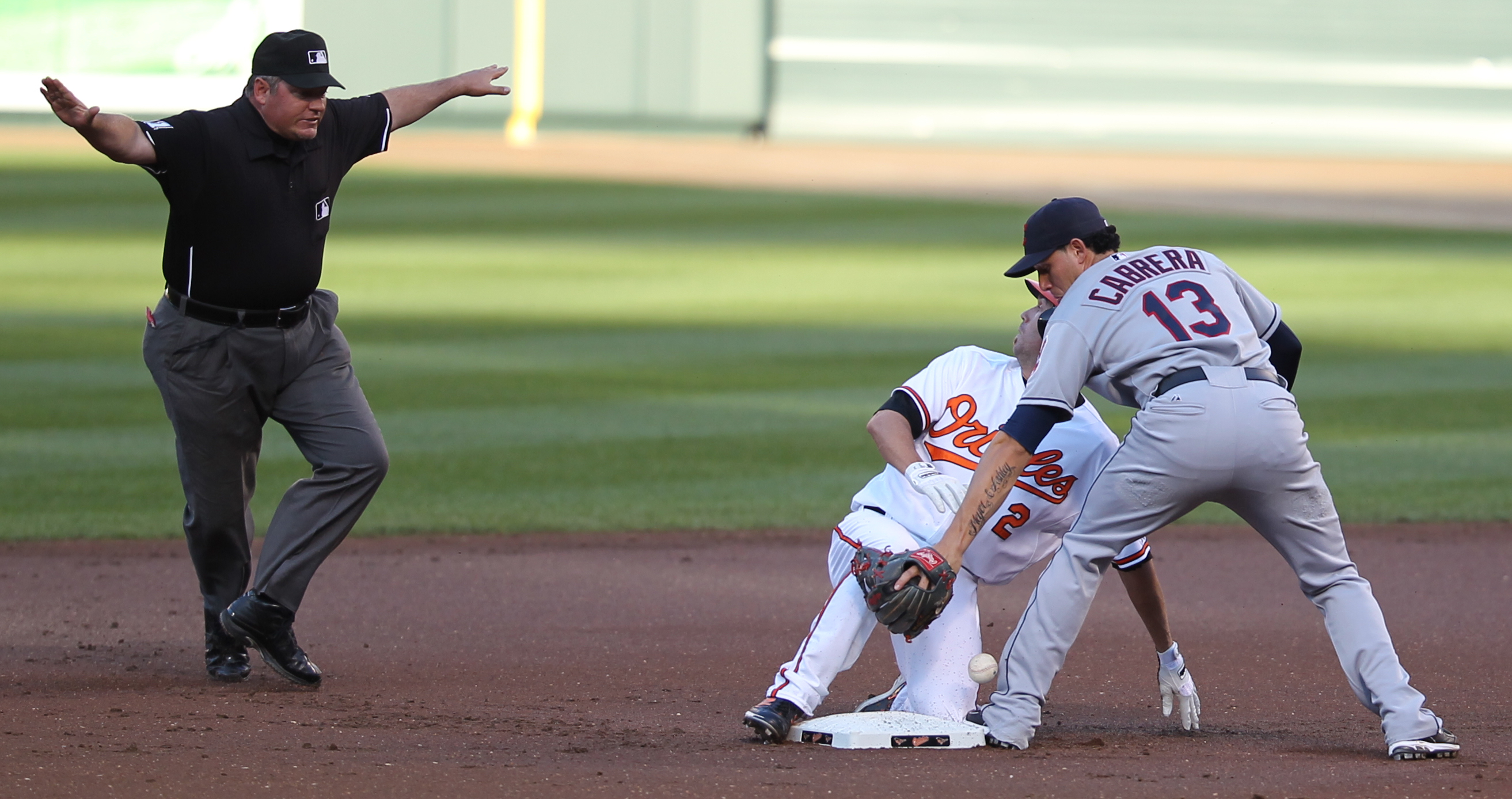
Cleveland Indians shortstop Asdrubal Cabrera (13) and Baltimore Orioles shortstop, with the umpire signaling “safe” with his hands

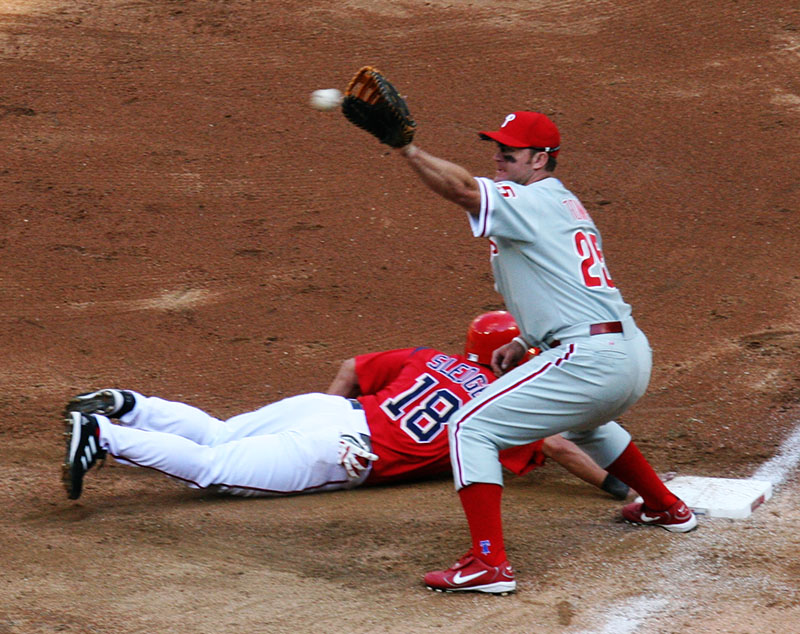
A baserunner "safe" on a base, just in time, on a pickoff attempt

In baseball, a baserunner is safe when he reaches a base without being put out by various ways. While a runner is touching a base, he is usually not in jeopardy of being put out, and is thus "safe" from fielders' actions, such as tags. The runner is in jeopardy once again, negating this safety, when:

- he ceases touching the base
- he is forced to reach another base on a force play or when tagging up
- a runner further along the basepath legally returns to the base that he is touching (two runners on the same base)
- he commits interference.

By the rules, a runner is safe when he is entitled to the base he is trying for. Umpires will signal that a runner is safe by extending their elbows to their sides and then extending their arms fully to the side. For emphasis, an umpire may fully cross and extend his arms several times to indicate safe. Verbally, the umpire will usually simply say "safe". If a close play occurs that may have appeared to be a putout, the umpire will also call a reason for the safe call, such as "he dropped the ball" or "he missed the tag".

Calling safe is a subjective decision which is better made using the sounds of the runner hitting the bag and the fielder catching the ball, rather than by sight.

== See also ==
- Tie goes to the runner
- Batsman in his/her ground, the cricket equivalent
