= Tige Stone =

American baseball player (1901–1960)

- Outfielder / Pitcher
- Born: September 18, 1901; Macon, Georgia, U.S.
- Died: January 1, 1960 (aged 58); Jacksonville, Florida, U.S.
- Batted: Right Threw: Right

MLB debut
- August 23, 1923, for the St. Louis Cardinals

Last MLB appearance
- October 7, 1923, for the St. Louis Cardinals

MLB statistics
- Games played: 5
- At bats: 1
- Hits: 1
- Stats at Baseball Reference

Teams
- St. Louis Cardinals (1923)

William Arthur "Tige" Stone (September 18, 1901 – January 1, 1960) was an American professional baseball outfielder and pitcher. He played in Major League Baseball (MLB) for the St. Louis Cardinals in 1923.

A single in his only at-bat left Stone with a rare MLB career batting average of 1.000.
