= 1922 Centenary Gentlemen football team =

American college football season

1922 Centenary Gentlemen football

LIAA champion
- Conference: Louisiana Intercollegiate Athletic Association
- Record: 8–1 (4–0 LIAA)
- Head coach: Bo McMillin (1st season)

The 1922 Centenary Gentlemen football team represented the Centenary College of Louisiana during the 1922 college football season. The nine-game schedule was the longest in school history. "A small, obscure liberal arts college with a student body of less than 300 suddenly fields a powerful football team in 1922." The team posted an 8–1 record and was led by head coach Bo McMillin, who preferred to be at a small school.

== Schedule ==
| Date | Opponent | Site | Result | Attendance | Source |
|---|---|---|---|---|---|
| September 30 | Marshall (TX) | Centenary Athletic Field; Shreveport, LA | W 77–0 | | |
| October 7 | Louisiana College | Centenary Athletic Field; Shreveport, LA | W 34–0 | | |
| October 14 | at Millsaps | Athletic Park; Jackson, MS | W 21–7 | | |
| October 21 | Tennessee Docs | Louisiana State Fairgrounds; Shreveport, LA | L 0–14 | | |
| October 25 | Louisiana Normal | Louisiana State Fairgrounds; Shreveport, LA | W 28–7 | | |
| November 4 | Loyola (LA) | Centenary Athletic Field; Shreveport, LA | W 48–0 | 2,500 | |
| November 11 | Henderson-Brown | Centenary Athletic Field; Shreveport, LA | W 28–0 | | |
| November 18 | at Louisville | Eclipse Park; Louisville, KY | W 39–13 | | |
| November 30 | Louisiana Tech | Centenary Athletic Field; Shreveport, LA | W 20–0 | 8,000 | |
