= List of East Tennessee State Buccaneers men's basketball head coaches =

The following is a list of East Tennessee State Buccaneers men's basketball head coaches. There have been 19 head coaches of the Buccaneers in their 107-season history.

East Tennessee State's current head coach is Brooks Savage. He was hired as the Buccaneers' head coach in March 2023, replacing Desmond Oliver, who was fired after the 2022–23 season.

No.	Tenure	Coach	Years	Record	Pct.
1	1918–1922	Charlie Reece	4	19–12	.613
2	1922–1923	Vernon McFee	1	5–5	.500
3	1923–1925	James Karl Luck	2	10–15	.400
4	1925–1931	John Robinson	6	25–40	.385
–	1931–1933 (Note: Records for the 1931–32 season are incomplete; only the team's final record is known. All records for the 1932–33 season are lost.)	Unknown	2	12–6	.667
5	1933–1947 (Note: East Tennessee State did not field a team for the 1943–44 season.)	Gene McMurray	13	90–84	.517
6	1947–1948	Loyd Roberts	1	9–8	.529
7	1948–1973	Madison Brooks	25	370–263	.585
8	1973–1976	Leroy Fisher	3	23–52	.307
9	1976–1978	Sonny Smith	2	30–23	.566
10	1978–1982	Jim Halihan	4	57–53	.518
11	1982–1985	Barry Dowd	4	40–46	.465
12	1985–1990	Les Robinson	5	81–70	.536
13	1990–1996	Alan LeForce	6	108–70	.607
14	1996–2003	Ed DeChellis	7	105–93	.530
15	2003–2015	Murry Bartow	12	224–165	.576
16	2015–2020	Steve Forbes	5	130–43	.751
17	2020–2021	Jason Shay	1	13–12	.520
18	2021–2023	Desmond Oliver	2	27–37	.422
19	2023–present	Brooks Savage	3	61–40	.604
Totals		19 coaches	107 seasons	1,439–1,137	.559
Records updated through end of 2025–26 season * - Denotes interim head coach. Source
