= 1922 West Tennessee State Normal football team =

American college football season

1922 West Tennessee State Normal football
- Conference: Independent
- Record: 5–2–3
- Head coach: Lester Barnard (1st season)
- Captain: Charley Glascock
- Home stadium: Russwood Park, Hodges Field, Tri-State Fair grounds

1922 Southern college football independents records
	Conf.			Overall
Team	W	L	T	W		L		T
West Virginia		–		10	–	0	–	1
Tennessee Docs		–		7	–	0	–	1
Western Kentucky State Normal		–		9	–	1	–	0
Trinity (NC)		–		7	–	2	–	1
VMI		–		7	–	2	–	0
Abilene Christian		–		6	–	2	–	0
Richmond		–		6	–	2	–	1
West Tennessee State Normal		–		5	–	2	–	3
Navy		–		5	–	2	–	0
Delaware		–		6	–	3	–	0
Stetson		–		4	–	2	–	0
William & Mary		–		6	–	3	–	0
Georgetown		–		6	–	3	–	1
Marion		–		5	–	4	–	1
East Tennessee		–		5	–	4	–	0
Marshall		–		5	–	4	–	0
Roanoke		–		5	–	4	–	0
Texas Mines		–		5	–	4	–	0
Loyola (LA)		–		4	–	3	–	1
Spring Hill		–		4	–	4	–	0
Sam Houston Normal		–		3	–	4	–	0
Wake Forest		–		3	–	5	–	2
Davidson		–		2	–	6	–	2
Catholic University		–		2	–	6	–	0
George Washington		–		2	–	6	–	0
Middle Tennessee State Normal		–		2	–	6	–	0
Mississippi Normal		–		2	–	6	–	0
Louisville		–		2	–	7	–	0
Birmingham–Southern		–		1	–	6	–	1
Erskine		–		0	–	8	–	0

The 1922 West Tennessee State Normal football team was an American football team that represented West Tennessee State Normal School (now known as the University of Memphis) as an independent during the 1922 college football season. In their first season under head coach Lester Barnard, West Tennessee State Normal compiled a 5–2–3 record.

== Schedule ==
Date	Time	Opponent	Site	Result	Attendance	Source
September 29	10:00 a.m.	Tupelo Military Institute	Tri-State Fair grounds; Memphis, TN	W 6–0		
October 6	3:15 p.m.	Memphis University School	Russwood Park; Memphis, TN	L 6–7		
October 13		at Blytheville High School	Blytheville, AR	T 6–6		
October 14		at Wilson High School (AR)	Wilson, AR	T 0–0		
October 21		at Arkansas College	Batesville, AR	L 0–13		
October 27	3:30 p.m.	Christian Brothers	Hodges Field; Memphis, TN	W 36–0	1,000	
November 3		at Arkansas Normal	Conway, AR	T 0–0		
November 10	2:30 p.m.	Southwestern Presbyterian	Russwood Park; Memphis, TN	W 26–0		
November 24	2:30 p.m.	Jonesboro Aggies	Russwood Park; Memphis, TN (rivalry)	W 68–0		
November 30		at Bethel (TN)	McKenzie, TN	W 26–0		
All times are in Central time
