= 1922 Louisiana Tech Bulldogs football team =

American college football season

1922 Louisiana Tech Bulldogs football
- Conference: Louisiana Intercollegiate Athletic Association
- Record: 5–1–1 (1–1–1 LIAA)
- Head coach: William Henry Dietz (1st season)
- Captain: Edgar L. Walker

The 1922 Louisiana Tech Bulldogs football team was an American football team that represented the Louisiana Polytechnic Institute—now known as Louisiana Tech University—as a member of the Louisiana Intercollegiate Athletic Association (LIAA) during the 1922 college football season. Led by first-year head coach William Henry Dietz, Louisiana Tech compiled an overall record of 5–1–1. The team's captain was Edgar L. Walker.

== Schedule ==
Date	Opponent	Site	Result	Attendance	Source
October 14	Hendrix*	Ruston, LA	W 34–0		
October 20	at Louisiana Normal	Normal Athletic Park; Natchitoches, LA (rivalry)	T 0–0		
October 27	Clarke Memorial College*	Ruston, LA	W 100–0		
November 3	Henderson-Brown*	Ruston, LA	W 34–0		
November 11	at Louisiana College	Alexandria, LA	W 33–6		
November 18	Arkansas A&M*	Ruston, LA	W 89–0		
November 30	at Centenary	Shreveport, LA	L 0–20	8,000	
*Non-conference game
