= James Karl Luck =

American football and basketball coach (1891–1971)

Biographical details
- Born: October 1, 1891
- Died: September 27, 1971 (aged 79)

Playing career

Football
- 1915–1916: Tennessee
- Position: Fullback

Coaching career (HC unless noted)

Football
- 1922–1924: East Tennessee State

Basketball
- 1923–1925: East Tennessee State

James Karl Luck (October 1, 1891 – September 27, 1971) was an American college football and college basketball coach. He served as the head football coach (1922–1924) and head men's basketball coach (1923–1925) at East Tennessee State Normal School—now known as East Tennessee State University.

Luck lettered as a fullback for the Tennessee Volunteers football team in 1915 and 1916.

== Head coaching record ==
Year	Team	Overall	Conference	Standing	Bowl/playoffs
East Tennessee State Normal (Independent) (1922–1924)
1922	East Tennessee State Normal	6–3			
1923	East Tennessee State Normal	3–6			
1924	East Tennessee State Normal	3–4–1			
East Tennessee Teachers:		12–13–1			
Total:		12–13–1			
