= 1922 Spring Hill Badgers football team =

American college football season

1922 Spring Hill Badgers football
- Conference: Independent
- Record: 4–4
- Head coach: Moon Ducote (4th season)
- Home stadium: Maxon Field, Monroe Park

1922 Southern college football independents records
	Conf.			Overall
Team	W	L	T	W		L		T
West Virginia		–		10	–	0	–	1
Tennessee Docs		–		7	–	0	–	1
Western Kentucky State Normal		–		9	–	1	–	0
Trinity (NC)		–		7	–	2	–	1
VMI		–		7	–	2	–	0
Abilene Christian		–		6	–	2	–	0
Richmond		–		6	–	2	–	1
West Tennessee State Normal		–		5	–	2	–	3
Navy		–		5	–	2	–	0
Delaware		–		6	–	3	–	0
Stetson		–		4	–	2	–	0
William & Mary		–		6	–	3	–	0
Georgetown		–		6	–	3	–	1
Marion		–		5	–	4	–	1
East Tennessee		–		5	–	4	–	0
Marshall		–		5	–	4	–	0
Roanoke		–		5	–	4	–	0
Texas Mines		–		5	–	4	–	0
Loyola (LA)		–		4	–	3	–	1
Spring Hill		–		4	–	4	–	0
Sam Houston Normal		–		3	–	4	–	0
Wake Forest		–		3	–	5	–	2
Davidson		–		2	–	6	–	2
Catholic University		–		2	–	6	–	0
George Washington		–		2	–	6	–	0
Middle Tennessee State Normal		–		2	–	6	–	0
Mississippi Normal		–		2	–	6	–	0
Louisville		–		2	–	7	–	0
Birmingham–Southern		–		1	–	6	–	1
Erskine		–		0	–	8	–	0

The 1922 Spring Hill Badgers football team represented the Spring Hill College as an independent during the 1922 college football season.

== Schedule ==
Date	Opponent	Site	Result	Source
October 7	at Auburn	Cramton Bowl; Montgomery, AL	L 6–19	
October 14	at Tulane	Tulane Stadium; New Orleans, LA	L 10–30	
October 21	Marion	Monroe Park; Mobile, AL	W 31–18	
October 28	Loyola (LA)	Maxon Field; Mobile, AL	W 14–0	
November 2	at LSU	State Field; Baton Rouge, LA	L 7–25	
November 11	Howard (AL)	Monroe Park; Mobile, AL	W 48–0	
November 18	at Southwestern Louisiana	Girard Field; Lafayette, LA	W 13–12	
November 25	Mississippi College	Monroe Park; Mobile, AL	L 6–7	
