= 1922 Birmingham–Southern Panthers football team =

American college football season

1922 Birmingham–Southern Panthers football
- Conference: Independent
- Record: 1–6–1
- Head coach: Charles H. Brown (4th season)
- Home stadium: Rickwood Field; Munger Field

1922 Southern college football independents records
	Conf.			Overall
Team	W	L	T	W		L		T
West Virginia		–		10	–	0	–	1
Tennessee Docs		–		7	–	0	–	1
Western Kentucky State Normal		–		9	–	1	–	0
Trinity (NC)		–		7	–	2	–	1
VMI		–		7	–	2	–	0
Abilene Christian		–		6	–	2	–	0
Richmond		–		6	–	2	–	1
West Tennessee State Normal		–		5	–	2	–	3
Navy		–		5	–	2	–	0
Delaware		–		6	–	3	–	0
Stetson		–		4	–	2	–	0
William & Mary		–		6	–	3	–	0
Georgetown		–		6	–	3	–	1
Marion		–		5	–	4	–	1
East Tennessee		–		5	–	4	–	0
Marshall		–		5	–	4	–	0
Roanoke		–		5	–	4	–	0
Texas Mines		–		5	–	4	–	0
Loyola (LA)		–		4	–	3	–	1
Spring Hill		–		4	–	4	–	0
Sam Houston Normal		–		3	–	4	–	0
Wake Forest		–		3	–	5	–	2
Davidson		–		2	–	6	–	2
Catholic University		–		2	–	6	–	0
George Washington		–		2	–	6	–	0
Middle Tennessee State Normal		–		2	–	6	–	0
Mississippi Normal		–		2	–	6	–	0
Louisville		–		2	–	7	–	0
Birmingham–Southern		–		1	–	6	–	1
Erskine		–		0	–	8	–	0

The 1922 Birmingham–Southern Panthers football team was an American football team that represented Birmingham–Southern College as an independent during the 1922 college football season. In their fourth season under head coach Charles H. Brown, the team compiled a 1–6–1 record.

== Schedule ==
Date	Opponent	Site	Result	Source
October 7	at Mississippi A&M	Scott Field; Starkville, MS	L 0–14	
October 13	Mercer	Rickwood Field; Birmingham, AL	L 13–17	
October 21	at Chattanooga	Chamberlain Field; Chattanooga, TN	T 0–0	
October 28	Millsaps	Munger Field; Birmingham, AL	W 21–0	
November 4	at Ole Miss	Hemingway Stadium; Oxford, MS	L 0–6	
November 11	at Sewanee	Hardee Field; Sewanee, TN	L 0–21	
November 18	at Mississippi College	Provine Field; Clinton, MS	L 0–6	
November 25	vs. Howard (AL)	Rickwood Field; Birmingham, AL	L 7–9	
