= 1922 Wake Forest Baptists football team =

American college football season

1922 Wake Forest Baptists football
- Conference: Independent
- Record: 3–5–2
- Head coach: George Levene (1st season)
- Captain: George Heckman
- Home stadium: Gore Field

1922 Southern college football independents records
	Conf.			Overall
Team	W	L	T	W		L		T
West Virginia		–		10	–	0	–	1
Tennessee Docs		–		7	–	0	–	1
Western Kentucky State Normal		–		9	–	1	–	0
Trinity (NC)		–		7	–	2	–	1
VMI		–		7	–	2	–	0
Abilene Christian		–		6	–	2	–	0
Richmond		–		6	–	2	–	1
West Tennessee State Normal		–		5	–	2	–	3
Navy		–		5	–	2	–	0
Delaware		–		6	–	3	–	0
Stetson		–		4	–	2	–	0
William & Mary		–		6	–	3	–	0
Georgetown		–		6	–	3	–	1
Marion		–		5	–	4	–	1
East Tennessee		–		5	–	4	–	0
Marshall		–		5	–	4	–	0
Roanoke		–		5	–	4	–	0
Texas Mines		–		5	–	4	–	0
Loyola (LA)		–		4	–	3	–	1
Spring Hill		–		4	–	4	–	0
Sam Houston Normal		–		3	–	4	–	0
Wake Forest		–		3	–	5	–	2
Davidson		–		2	–	6	–	2
Catholic University		–		2	–	6	–	0
George Washington		–		2	–	6	–	0
Middle Tennessee State Normal		–		2	–	6	–	0
Mississippi Normal		–		2	–	6	–	0
Louisville		–		2	–	7	–	0
Birmingham–Southern		–		1	–	6	–	1
Erskine		–		0	–	8	–	0

The 1922 Wake Forest Baptists football team was an American football team that represented Wake Forest University during the 1922 college football season. In its first and only season under head coach George Levene, the team compiled a 3–5–2 record.

== Schedule ==
Date	Opponent	Site	Result	Attendance	Source
September 23	Atlantic Christian	Gore Field; Wake Forest, NC	W 34–0		
September 30	vs. North Carolina	Wayne County fairgrounds; Goldsboro, NC (rivalry)	L 3–62		
October 7	Elon	Gore Field; Wake Forest, NC	W 3–0		
October 14	vs. Davidson	Wearn Field; Charlotte, NC	T 6–6	4,000	
October 21	at Lynchburg	Lynchburg, VA	L 7–20		
October 27	at Guilford	Greensboro, NC	T 0–0		
November 4	vs. William & Mary	League Park; Norfolk, VA	L 0–18		
November 11	vs. Trinity (NC)	Raleigh, NC (rivalry)	L 0–3		
November 25	NC State^{†}	Gore Field; Wake Forest, NC (rivalry)	L 0–32	2,500	
November 30	vs. Hampden–Sydney	League Park; Norfolk, VA	W 9–3		
^{†}Homecoming
