= 1922 Western Kentucky State Normal football team =

American college football season

1922 Western Kentucky State Normal football
- Conference: Independent
- Record: 9–1
- Head coach: Edgar Diddle (1st season)

1922 Southern college football independents records
	Conf.			Overall
Team	W	L	T	W		L		T
West Virginia		–		10	–	0	–	1
Tennessee Docs		–		7	–	0	–	1
Western Kentucky State Normal		–		9	–	1	–	0
Trinity (NC)		–		7	–	2	–	1
VMI		–		7	–	2	–	0
Abilene Christian		–		6	–	2	–	0
Richmond		–		6	–	2	–	1
West Tennessee State Normal		–		5	–	2	–	3
Navy		–		5	–	2	–	0
Delaware		–		6	–	3	–	0
Stetson		–		4	–	2	–	0
William & Mary		–		6	–	3	–	0
Georgetown		–		6	–	3	–	1
Marion		–		5	–	4	–	1
East Tennessee		–		5	–	4	–	0
Marshall		–		5	–	4	–	0
Roanoke		–		5	–	4	–	0
Texas Mines		–		5	–	4	–	0
Loyola (LA)		–		4	–	3	–	1
Spring Hill		–		4	–	4	–	0
Sam Houston Normal		–		3	–	4	–	0
Wake Forest		–		3	–	5	–	2
Davidson		–		2	–	6	–	2
Catholic University		–		2	–	6	–	0
George Washington		–		2	–	6	–	0
Middle Tennessee State Normal		–		2	–	6	–	0
Mississippi Normal		–		2	–	6	–	0
Louisville		–		2	–	7	–	0
Birmingham–Southern		–		1	–	6	–	1
Erskine		–		0	–	8	–	0

The 1922 Western Kentucky State Normal football team represented Western Kentucky State Normal School and Teachers College (now known as Western Kentucky University) in the 1922 college football season. They were coached by legendary basketball coach Edgar Diddle in his first year as football coach. His team set a school record for wins that would not be matched for 30 years and not broken until 1963.

== Schedule ==
Date	Opponent	Site	Result	Source
September 30	at Louisville	Eclipse Park; Louisville, KY	W 6–0	
October 6	Middle Tennessee State Normal	Bowling Green, KY (rivalry)	W 31–6	
October 13	Cumberland (KY)	Bowling Green, KY	W 13–7	
October 21	Tennessee Tech	Bowling Green, KY	W 19–0	
October 27	Morton Elliott	Bowling Green, KY	W 63–0	
November 4	Bethel (TN)	Bowling Green, KY	W 19–0	
November 10	Eastern Kentucky	Bowling Green, KY (rivalry)	W 47–6	
November 18	Vanderbilt B	Bowling Green, KY	L 6–13	
November 24	Bryson	Bowling Green, KY	W 23–12	
November 30	Southwestern Presbyterian	Bowling Green, KY	W 28–0	
