= 1922 West Virginia Mountaineers football team =

American college football season

1922 West Virginia Mountaineers football

San Diego East-West Christmas Classic champion

San Diego East-West Christmas Classic, W 21–13 vs. Gonzaga
- Conference: Independent
- Record: 10–0–1
- Head coach: Clarence Spears (2nd season)
- Captain: Russ Meredith

1922 Southern college football independents records
	Conf.			Overall
Team	W	L	T	W		L		T
West Virginia		–		10	–	0	–	1
Tennessee Docs		–		7	–	0	–	1
Western Kentucky State Normal		–		9	–	1	–	0
Trinity (NC)		–		7	–	2	–	1
VMI		–		7	–	2	–	0
Abilene Christian		–		6	–	2	–	0
Richmond		–		6	–	2	–	1
West Tennessee State Normal		–		5	–	2	–	3
Navy		–		5	–	2	–	0
Tennessee State		–		3	–	1	–	1
Delaware		–		6	–	3	–	0
Stetson		–		4	–	2	–	0
William & Mary		–		6	–	3	–	0
Georgetown		–		6	–	3	–	1
Marion		–		5	–	4	–	1
East Tennessee		–		5	–	4	–	0
Marshall		–		5	–	4	–	0
Roanoke		–		5	–	4	–	0
Texas Mines		–		5	–	4	–	0
Loyola (LA)		–		4	–	3	–	1
Spring Hill		–		4	–	4	–	0
Sam Houston Normal		–		3	–	4	–	0
Wake Forest		–		3	–	5	–	2
Davidson		–		2	–	6	–	2
Catholic University		–		2	–	6	–	0
George Washington		–		2	–	6	–	0
Middle Tennessee State Normal		–		2	–	6	–	0
Mississippi Normal		–		2	–	6	–	0
Louisville		–		2	–	7	–	0
Birmingham–Southern		–		1	–	6	–	1
Erskine		–		0	–	8	–	0

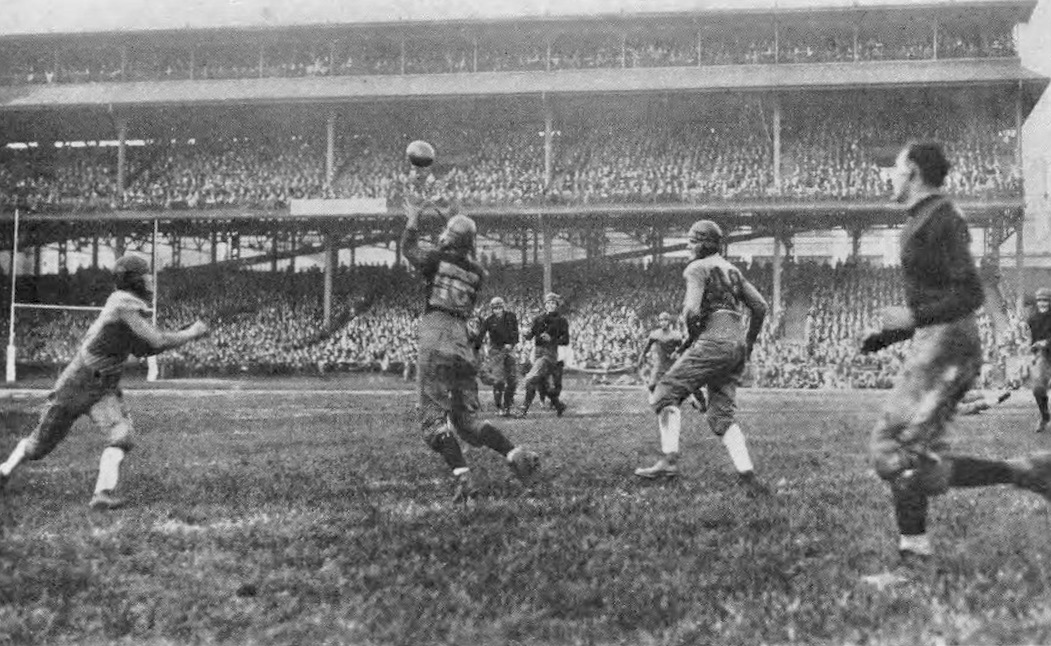
Pitt's Charles Bowser intercepting a pass versus West Virginia during the 1922 game

The 1922 West Virginia Mountaineers football team was an American football team that represented West Virginia University as an independent during the 1922 college football season. In its second season under head coach Clarence Spears, the team compiled a 10–0–1 record, shut out seven of its eleven opponents, and outscored all opponents by a total of 267 to 34. West Virginia was the only undefeated bowl champion in 1922 (when there were few bowl games), as well as the only team to win 10 or more games. The team also played in the school's first bowl game, defeating Gonzaga, 21–13, in the San Diego East-West Christmas Classic.

== Schedule ==
Date	Opponent	Site	Result	Attendance	Source
September 30	vs. West Virginia Wesleyan	South Side Park; Fairmont, WV	W 20–3	8,000	
October 7	Marietta	WVU Athletic Field; Morgantown, WV	W 55–0		
October 14	at Pittsburgh	Forbes Field; Pittsburgh, PA (rivalry)	W 9–6	15,000	
October 21	vs. Washington and Lee	Laidley Field; Charleston, WV	T 12–12	7,500	
October 28	Rutgers	WVU Athletic Field; Morgantown, WV	W 28–0	6,000	
November 4	at Cincinnati	Carson Field; Cincinnati, OH	W 34–0	2,500	
November 11	at Indiana	Jordan Field; Bloomington, IN	W 33–0	8,000	
November 18	Virginia	WVU Athletic Field; Morgantown, WV	W 13–0	6,000	
November 25	Ohio	WVU Athletic Field; Morgantown, WV	W 28–0	300	
November 30	Washington & Jefferson^{†}	WVU Athletic Field; Morgantown, WV	W 14–0	13,000	
December 25	vs. Gonzaga	Balboa Stadium; San Diego, CA (San Diego East-West Christmas Classic)	W 21–13	15,000	
^{†}Homecoming
