= 1922 Middle Tennessee State Normal football team =

American college football season

1922 Middle Tennessee State Normal football
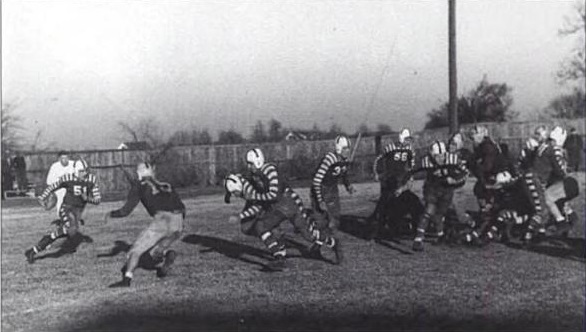
- Conference: Independent
- Record: 2–6
- Head coach: Alfred B. Miles (8th season)
- Captain: Dewey Hunter

1922 Southern college football independents records
	Conf.			Overall
Team	W	L	T	W		L		T
West Virginia		–		10	–	0	–	1
Tennessee Docs		–		7	–	0	–	1
Western Kentucky State Normal		–		9	–	1	–	0
Trinity (NC)		–		7	–	2	–	1
VMI		–		7	–	2	–	0
Abilene Christian		–		6	–	2	–	0
Richmond		–		6	–	2	–	1
West Tennessee State Normal		–		5	–	2	–	3
Navy		–		5	–	2	–	0
Delaware		–		6	–	3	–	0
Stetson		–		4	–	2	–	0
William & Mary		–		6	–	3	–	0
Georgetown		–		6	–	3	–	1
Marion		–		5	–	4	–	1
East Tennessee		–		5	–	4	–	0
Marshall		–		5	–	4	–	0
Roanoke		–		5	–	4	–	0
Texas Mines		–		5	–	4	–	0
Loyola (LA)		–		4	–	3	–	1
Spring Hill		–		4	–	4	–	0
Sam Houston Normal		–		3	–	4	–	0
Wake Forest		–		3	–	5	–	2
Davidson		–		2	–	6	–	2
Catholic University		–		2	–	6	–	0
George Washington		–		2	–	6	–	0
Middle Tennessee State Normal		–		2	–	6	–	0
Mississippi Normal		–		2	–	6	–	0
Louisville		–		2	–	7	–	0
Birmingham–Southern		–		1	–	6	–	1
Erskine		–		0	–	8	–	0

The 1922 Middle Tennessee State Normal football team represented the Middle Tennessee State Normal School (now known as Middle Tennessee State University) during the 1922 college football season. The team captain was Dewey Hunter.

== Schedule ==
Date	Opponent	Site	Result	Attendance	Source
September 30	at Vanderbilt	Curry Field; Nashville, TN	L 0–38	2,500	
October 6	at Western Kentucky State Normal	Bowling Green, KY (rivalry)	L 0–31		
	Bethel (KY)*	Murfreesboro, TN	L 0–9		
	Bryson	Murfreesboro, TN	W 13–12		
October 28	at Southwestern Presbyterian	Clarksville, TN	W 7–0		
	Sewanee freshmen	Murfreesboro, TN	L 0–19		
	Vanderbilt freshmen	Murfreesboro, TN	L 0–25		
November 24	at Union (TN)	Jackson, TN	L 0–41		
*Non-conference game
