= 1922 Erskine Seceders football team =

American college football season

1922 Erskine Seceders football
- Conference: Independent
- Record: 0–8
- Head coach: David W. Parrish (3rd season)

1922 Southern college football independents records
	Conf.			Overall
Team	W	L	T	W		L		T
West Virginia		–		10	–	0	–	1
Tennessee Docs		–		7	–	0	–	1
Western Kentucky State Normal		–		9	–	1	–	0
Trinity (NC)		–		7	–	2	–	1
VMI		–		7	–	2	–	0
Abilene Christian		–		6	–	2	–	0
Richmond		–		6	–	2	–	1
West Tennessee State Normal		–		5	–	2	–	3
Navy		–		5	–	2	–	0
Delaware		–		6	–	3	–	0
Stetson		–		4	–	2	–	0
William & Mary		–		6	–	3	–	0
Georgetown		–		6	–	3	–	1
Marion		–		5	–	4	–	1
East Tennessee		–		5	–	4	–	0
Marshall		–		5	–	4	–	0
Roanoke		–		5	–	4	–	0
Texas Mines		–		5	–	4	–	0
Loyola (LA)		–		4	–	3	–	1
Spring Hill		–		4	–	4	–	0
Sam Houston Normal		–		3	–	4	–	0
Wake Forest		–		3	–	5	–	2
Davidson		–		2	–	6	–	2
Catholic University		–		2	–	6	–	0
George Washington		–		2	–	6	–	0
Middle Tennessee State Normal		–		2	–	6	–	0
Mississippi Normal		–		2	–	6	–	0
Louisville		–		2	–	7	–	0
Birmingham–Southern		–		1	–	6	–	1
Erskine		–		0	–	8	–	0

The 1922 Erskine Seceders football team represented Erskine College as an independent during the 1922 college football season. Led by third-year head coach David W. Parrish, the Seceders compiled an overall record of 0–8.

== Schedule ==
Date	Opponent	Site	Result	Source
September 29	at South Carolina*	University Field; Columbia, SC	L 0–13	
October 13	Wofford	Due West, SC	L 0–5	
October 19	vs. Presbyterian	Piedmont Fairgrounds; Greenwood, SC	L 0–19	
October 28	vs. Elon	Wearn Field; Charlotte, NC	L 0–10	
November 4	at Furman	Manly Field; Greenville, SC	L 6–67	
November 10	at Newberry	Setzler Field; Newberry, SC	L 0–36	
November 18	at Clemson	Riggs Field; Calhoun, SC	L 0–52	
November 30	at The Citadel	College Park Stadium; Charleston, SC	L 0–26	
*Non-conference game
