= 1922 East Tennessee State Normal football team =

American college football season

1922 East Tennessee State Normal football
- Conference: Independent
- Record: 3–4 (5–4 with non-countable games)
- Head coach: James Karl Luck (1st season)

1922 Southern college football independents records
	Conf.			Overall
Team	W	L	T	W		L		T
West Virginia		–		10	–	0	–	1
Tennessee Docs		–		7	–	0	–	1
Western Kentucky State Normal		–		9	–	1	–	0
Trinity (NC)		–		7	–	2	–	1
VMI		–		7	–	2	–	0
Abilene Christian		–		6	–	2	–	0
Richmond		–		6	–	2	–	1
West Tennessee State Normal		–		5	–	2	–	3
Navy		–		5	–	2	–	0
Delaware		–		6	–	3	–	0
Stetson		–		4	–	2	–	0
William & Mary		–		6	–	3	–	0
Georgetown		–		6	–	3	–	1
Marion		–		5	–	4	–	1
East Tennessee		–		5	–	4	–	0
Marshall		–		5	–	4	–	0
Roanoke		–		5	–	4	–	0
Texas Mines		–		5	–	4	–	0
Loyola (LA)		–		4	–	3	–	1
Spring Hill		–		4	–	4	–	0
Sam Houston Normal		–		3	–	4	–	0
Wake Forest		–		3	–	5	–	2
Davidson		–		2	–	6	–	2
Catholic University		–		2	–	6	–	0
George Washington		–		2	–	6	–	0
Middle Tennessee State Normal		–		2	–	6	–	0
Mississippi Normal		–		2	–	6	–	0
Louisville		–		2	–	7	–	0
Birmingham–Southern		–		1	–	6	–	1
Erskine		–		0	–	8	–	0

The 1922 East Tennessee State Normal School football team was an American football team that represented East Tennessee State Normal School—now known as East Tennessee State University (ETSU)—as an independent in the 1922 college football season. They were coached by first-year head coach James Karl Luck, a University of Tennessee graduate who taught agriculture and also coached basketball at the school. He was assisted by fellow teacher A. V. McFee, who is credited as serving as the team's first trainer. Half of the team's player that never played football before. East Tennessee State Normal School finished the season a 3–4 record (5–4 with non-countable opponents). The season was highlighted by a 3–0 upset of cross-county rival Milligan on Thanksgiving Day in front of a crowd of 3,000 at Wilder Park.

== Schedule ==
Date	Time	Opponent	Site	Result	Attendance	Source
		Johnson City High School	Johnson City, TN	W 19–0		
September 29		at Maryville (TN)	Maryville, TN	L 0–58		
October 7		at Tusculum	Tusculum, TN	L 0–7		
October 14	3:30 p.m.	Murphy	Normal Grounds; Johnson City, TN	W 26–0		
October 21		Maryville Tech	Johnson City, TN	W 19–12		
November 4		Washington College		W 49–0		
November 11		at Athens	Athens, TN	L 6–19		
November 25		King	Johnson City, TN	L 0–56		
November 30		Milligan	Wilder Park; Johnson City, TN	W 3–0	3,000	
All times are in Eastern time
