= 1922 Mississippi Normal Normalites football team =

American college football season

1922 Mississippi Normal Normalites football
- Conference: Independent
- Record: 2–6
- Head coach: O. V. Austin (2nd season)
- Home stadium: Kamper Park

1922 Southern college football independents records
	Conf.			Overall
Team	W	L	T	W		L		T
West Virginia		–		10	–	0	–	1
Tennessee Docs		–		7	–	0	–	1
Western Kentucky State Normal		–		9	–	1	–	0
Trinity (NC)		–		7	–	2	–	1
VMI		–		7	–	2	–	0
Abilene Christian		–		6	–	2	–	0
Richmond		–		6	–	2	–	1
West Tennessee State Normal		–		5	–	2	–	3
Navy		–		5	–	2	–	0
Delaware		–		6	–	3	–	0
Stetson		–		4	–	2	–	0
William & Mary		–		6	–	3	–	0
Georgetown		–		6	–	3	–	1
Marion		–		5	–	4	–	1
East Tennessee		–		5	–	4	–	0
Marshall		–		5	–	4	–	0
Roanoke		–		5	–	4	–	0
Texas Mines		–		5	–	4	–	0
Loyola (LA)		–		4	–	3	–	1
Spring Hill		–		4	–	4	–	0
Sam Houston Normal		–		3	–	4	–	0
Wake Forest		–		3	–	5	–	2
Davidson		–		2	–	6	–	2
Catholic University		–		2	–	6	–	0
George Washington		–		2	–	6	–	0
Middle Tennessee State Normal		–		2	–	6	–	0
Mississippi Normal		–		2	–	6	–	0
Louisville		–		2	–	7	–	0
Birmingham–Southern		–		1	–	6	–	1
Erskine		–		0	–	8	–	0

The 1922 Mississippi Normal Normalites football team was an American football team that represented Mississippi Normal College (now known as the University of Southern Mississippi) as an independent during the 1922 college football season. In their second year under head coach O. V. Austin, the team compiled a 2–6 record.

== Schedule ==
Date	Opponent	Site	Result	Source
September 29	at Jones County High School	Ellisville, MS	W 31–0	
October 7	Purvis High School	Kamper Park; Hattiesburg, MS	L 0–6	
October 19	at Millsaps	Athletic Park; Jackson, MS	L 7–10	
October 28	at Saint Stanislaus College	Bay St. Louis, MS	L 0–10	
November 4	Gulf Coast Military Academy	Kamper Park; Hattiesburg, MS	L 0–20	
November 11	at Loyola (LA)	New Orleans, LA	L 6–20	
November 17	at Marion	Marion, AL	L 0–44	
November 25	Mississippi A&M freshmen	Kamper Park; Hattiesburg, MS	W 19–12	
