= 1922 Richmond Spiders football team =

American college football season

1922 Richmond Spiders football
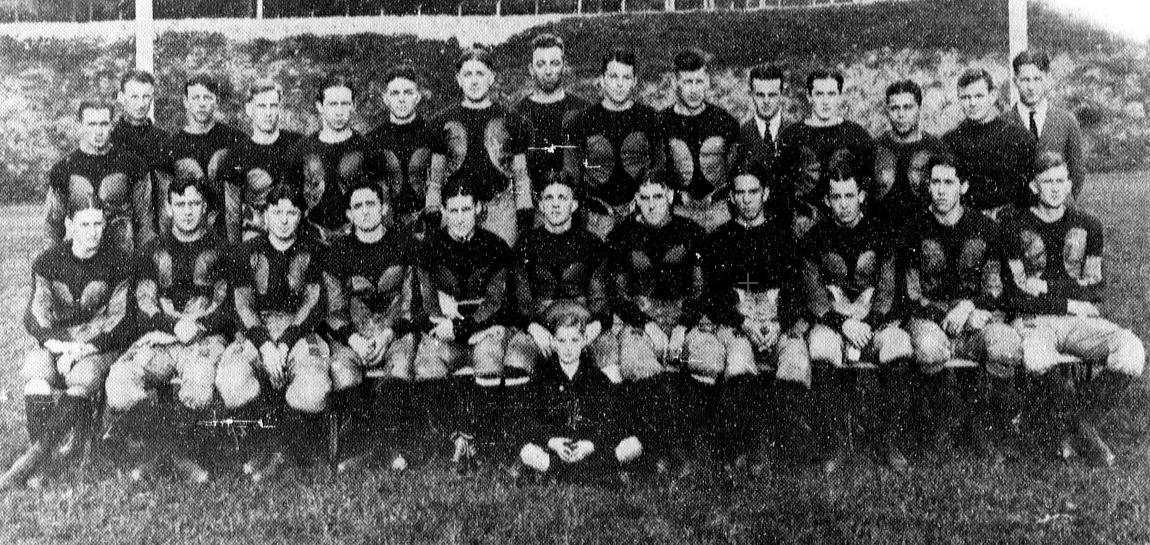
- Conference: Independent
- Record: 6–2–1
- Head coach: Frank Dobson (9th season)
- Captain: Waverly E. Jones
- Home stadium: Stadium Field

1922 Southern college football independents records
	Conf.			Overall
Team	W	L	T	W		L		T
West Virginia		–		10	–	0	–	1
Tennessee Docs		–		7	–	0	–	1
Western Kentucky State Normal		–		9	–	1	–	0
Trinity (NC)		–		7	–	2	–	1
VMI		–		7	–	2	–	0
Abilene Christian		–		6	–	2	–	0
Richmond		–		6	–	2	–	1
West Tennessee State Normal		–		5	–	2	–	3
Navy		–		5	–	2	–	0
Delaware		–		6	–	3	–	0
Stetson		–		4	–	2	–	0
William & Mary		–		6	–	3	–	0
Georgetown		–		6	–	3	–	1
Marion		–		5	–	4	–	1
East Tennessee		–		5	–	4	–	0
Marshall		–		5	–	4	–	0
Roanoke		–		5	–	4	–	0
Texas Mines		–		5	–	4	–	0
Loyola (LA)		–		4	–	3	–	1
Spring Hill		–		4	–	4	–	0
Sam Houston Normal		–		3	–	4	–	0
Wake Forest		–		3	–	5	–	2
Davidson		–		2	–	6	–	2
Catholic University		–		2	–	6	–	0
George Washington		–		2	–	6	–	0
Middle Tennessee State Normal		–		2	–	6	–	0
Mississippi Normal		–		2	–	6	–	0
Louisville		–		2	–	7	–	0
Birmingham–Southern		–		1	–	6	–	1
Erskine		–		0	–	8	–	0

The 1922 Richmond Spiders football team was an American football team that represented the University of Richmond as an independent during the 1922 college football season. Led by ninth-year head coach, Frank Dobson, Richmond compiled a record of 6–2–1. The team avenged the previous year's loss to Hampden–Sydney.

== Schedule ==
Date	Time	Opponent	Site	Result	Source
September 30		at Lafayette	Easton, PA	L 0–34	
October 7	3:20 p.m.	Maryland	Stadium Field; Richmond, VA	T 0–0	
October 14		at Virginia	Lambeth Field; Charlottesville, VA	L 6–14	
October 21		Roanoke	Stadium Field; Richmond, VA	W 6–0	
October 28		at Furman	Greenville, SC	W 13–0	
November 4		Randolph–Macon	Richmond, VA	W 43–13	
November 11		at Lynchburg	Lynchburg, VA	W 45–0	
November 18		Hampden–Sydney	Richmond, VA	W 34–0	
November 30		William & Mary	Richmond, VA (rivalry)	W 13–3	
All times are in Eastern time
