= 1922 Trinity Blue Devils football team =

American college football season

1922 Trinity Blue Devils football
- Conference: Independent
- Record: 7–2–1
- Head coach: Herman Steiner (1st season)
- Captain: Tom Neal

1922 Southern college football independents records
	Conf.			Overall
Team	W	L	T	W		L		T
West Virginia		–		10	–	0	–	1
Tennessee Docs		–		7	–	0	–	1
Western Kentucky State Normal		–		9	–	1	–	0
Trinity (NC)		–		7	–	2	–	1
VMI		–		7	–	2	–	0
Abilene Christian		–		6	–	2	–	0
Richmond		–		6	–	2	–	1
West Tennessee State Normal		–		5	–	2	–	3
Navy		–		5	–	2	–	0
Tennessee State		–		3	–	1	–	1
Delaware		–		6	–	3	–	0
Stetson		–		4	–	2	–	0
William & Mary		–		6	–	3	–	0
Georgetown		–		6	–	3	–	1
Marion		–		5	–	4	–	1
East Tennessee		–		5	–	4	–	0
Marshall		–		5	–	4	–	0
Roanoke		–		5	–	4	–	0
Texas Mines		–		5	–	4	–	0
Loyola (LA)		–		4	–	3	–	1
Spring Hill		–		4	–	4	–	0
Sam Houston Normal		–		3	–	4	–	0
Wake Forest		–		3	–	5	–	2
Davidson		–		2	–	6	–	2
Catholic University		–		2	–	6	–	0
George Washington		–		2	–	6	–	0
Middle Tennessee State Normal		–		2	–	6	–	0
Mississippi Normal		–		2	–	6	–	0
Louisville		–		2	–	7	–	0
Birmingham–Southern		–		1	–	6	–	1
Erskine		–		0	–	8	–	0

The 1922 Trinity Blue Devils football team was an American football team that represented Trinity College (later renamed Duke University) as an independent during the 1922 college football season. In its first and only season under head coach Herman Steiner, the team compiled a 7–2–1 record and outscored opponents by a total of 156 to 57. The team shut out five opponents: Guilford (43–0), Hampden–Sydney (27–0), Davidson (12–0), Wake Forest (3–0), and Wofford (26–0). Tom Neal was the team captain. According to the university, this was the first season in which the team was called the Blue Devils (having been previously known unofficially as the Blue and White). The name was introduced by The Trinity Chronicle, the school's student newspaper, and slowly gained acceptance over the following years.

== Schedule ==
Date	Opponent	Site	Result	Source
September 30	Guilford	Hanes Field; Durham, NC	W 43–0	
October 7	Hampden–Sydney	Hanes Field; Durham, NC	W 27–0	
October 12	at North Carolina	Emerson Field; Chapel Hill, NC (rivalry)	L 0–20	
October 21	vs. William & Mary	League Park; Norfolk, VA	L 7–13	
October 28	vs. Davidson	Cone Athletic Park (II); Greensboro, NC	W 12–0	
November 4	Oglethorpe	Hanes Field; Durham, NC	W 7–6	
November 11	vs. Wake Forest	Raleigh, NC	W 3–0	
November 17	Presbyterian	Hanes Field; Durham, NC	T 6–6	
November 25	Randolph–Macon	Hanes Field; Durham, NC	W 25–12	
November 30	Wofford	Hanes Field; Durham, NC	W 26–0	
