= 1922 Davidson Wildcats football team =

American college football season

1922 Davidson Wildcats football
- Conference: Independent
- Record: 2–6–2
- Head coach: H. M. Grey (3rd season)
- Home stadium: Sprunt Field

1922 Southern college football independents records
	Conf.			Overall
Team	W	L	T	W		L		T
West Virginia		–		10	–	0	–	1
Tennessee Docs		–		7	–	0	–	1
Western Kentucky State Normal		–		9	–	1	–	0
Trinity (NC)		–		7	–	2	–	1
VMI		–		7	–	2	–	0
Abilene Christian		–		6	–	2	–	0
Richmond		–		6	–	2	–	1
West Tennessee State Normal		–		5	–	2	–	3
Navy		–		5	–	2	–	0
Delaware		–		6	–	3	–	0
Stetson		–		4	–	2	–	0
William & Mary		–		6	–	3	–	0
Georgetown		–		6	–	3	–	1
Marion		–		5	–	4	–	1
East Tennessee		–		5	–	4	–	0
Marshall		–		5	–	4	–	0
Roanoke		–		5	–	4	–	0
Texas Mines		–		5	–	4	–	0
Loyola (LA)		–		4	–	3	–	1
Spring Hill		–		4	–	4	–	0
Sam Houston Normal		–		3	–	4	–	0
Wake Forest		–		3	–	5	–	2
Davidson		–		2	–	6	–	2
Catholic University		–		2	–	6	–	0
George Washington		–		2	–	6	–	0
Middle Tennessee State Normal		–		2	–	6	–	0
Mississippi Normal		–		2	–	6	–	0
Louisville		–		2	–	7	–	0
Birmingham–Southern		–		1	–	6	–	1
Erskine		–		0	–	8	–	0

The 1922 Davidson Wildcats football team was an American football team that represented Davidson College as an independent during the 1922 college football season. In their third year under head coach H. M. Grey, the team compiled a 2–6–2 record.

== Schedule ==
Date	Opponent	Site	Result	Attendance	Source
September 23	Elon	Sprunt Field; Davidson, NC	W 24–0		
September 29	at Presbyterian	Clinton, SC	L 7–8	1,300	
October 7	at Georgia Tech	Grant Field; Atlanta, GA	L 0–19		
October 14	vs. Wake Forest	Wearn Field; Charlotte, NC	T 6–6	4,000	
October 21	VPI^{†}	Sprunt Field; Davidson, NC	T 7–7	3,000	
October 28	vs. Trinity (NC)	Cone Athletic Park (II); Greensboro, NC	L 0–12	4,000	
November 4	at NC State	Riddick Stadium; Raleigh, NC	L 0–15		
November 11	vs. Wofford	Wearn Field; Charlotte, NC	W 34–0		
November 18	vs. North Carolina	Wearn Field; Charlotte, NC	L 6–29	7,500	
November 30	at Furman	Manly Field; Greenville, SC	L 10–13		
^{†}Homecoming
