= 1922 San Diego East-West Christmas Classic =

West Virginia Mountaineers	Gonzaga Bulldogs
(9–0–1)	(5–2)
21	13
Head coach: Clarence Spears	Head coach: Gus Dorais
	1	2	3	4	Total
West Virginia	7	7	7	0	21
Gonzaga	0	0	0	13	13
- Date: December 25, 1922
- Season: 1922
- Stadium: Balboa Stadium
- Location: San Diego, California
- Favorite: West Virginia
- Referee: Walter Eckersall
- Attendance: 15,000

The 1922 San Diego East-West Christmas Classic was a college football postseason bowl game between the West Virginia Mountaineers and Gonzaga Bulldogs.

== Background ==
This was the first bowl appearance for both teams and West Virginia was attempting to secure their first ten-win season. From Spokane, the Bulldogs were on a four-game winning streak, all played in the state of Washington.

== Game summary ==
West Virginia took a lead on Nick Nardacci's twelve-yard touchdown run, the only score in the first quarter. Russ Meredith returned an interception eighty yards to extend the lead to 14–0 at halftime. Jack Simons caught a touchdown pass from Nardacci in the third to make it 21–0. The Bulldogs narrowed the gap on two touchdowns from Matt Bross (one reception and one run), but that ended the scoring at 21–13, as the Mountaineers held on to win their first bowl game and gained a ten-win season.

== Aftermath ==
It is widely criticized that West Virginia was not invited to the Rose Bowl, but the team did receive a share of the national championship; their next bowl appearance was fifteen years later, at the Sun Bowl in El Paso, Texas. This was Gonzaga's only bowl game, as its football program was discontinued after the 1941 season.
