= 1922 Louisville Cardinals football team =

American college football season

1922 Louisville Cardinals football
- Conference: Independent
- Record: 2–7
- Head coach: Bill Duncan (2nd season)
- Home stadium: Eclipse Park

1922 Southern college football independents records
	Conf.			Overall
Team	W	L	T	W		L		T
West Virginia		–		10	–	0	–	1
Tennessee Docs		–		7	–	0	–	1
Western Kentucky State Normal		–		9	–	1	–	0
Trinity (NC)		–		7	–	2	–	1
VMI		–		7	–	2	–	0
Abilene Christian		–		6	–	2	–	0
Richmond		–		6	–	2	–	1
West Tennessee State Normal		–		5	–	2	–	3
Navy		–		5	–	2	–	0
Delaware		–		6	–	3	–	0
Stetson		–		4	–	2	–	0
William & Mary		–		6	–	3	–	0
Georgetown		–		6	–	3	–	1
Marion		–		5	–	4	–	1
East Tennessee		–		5	–	4	–	0
Marshall		–		5	–	4	–	0
Roanoke		–		5	–	4	–	0
Texas Mines		–		5	–	4	–	0
Loyola (LA)		–		4	–	3	–	1
Spring Hill		–		4	–	4	–	0
Sam Houston Normal		–		3	–	4	–	0
Wake Forest		–		3	–	5	–	2
Davidson		–		2	–	6	–	2
Catholic University		–		2	–	6	–	0
George Washington		–		2	–	6	–	0
Middle Tennessee State Normal		–		2	–	6	–	0
Mississippi Normal		–		2	–	6	–	0
Louisville		–		2	–	7	–	0
Birmingham–Southern		–		1	–	6	–	1
Erskine		–		0	–	8	–	0

The 1922 Louisville Cardinals football team was an American football team that represented the University of Louisville as an independent during the 1922 college football season. In their second and final season under head coach Bill Duncan, the Cardinals compiled a 2–7 record. The team played its home games at Eclipse Park in Louisville, Kentucky.

== Schedule ==
Date	Opponent	Site	Result	Source
September 30	Western Kentucky State Normal	Eclipse Park; Louisville, KY	L 0–6	
October 7	Bethel (KY)	Eclipse Park; Louisville, KY	L 12–14	
October 14	at Kentucky	Stoll Field; Lexington, KY (rivalry)	L 0–73	
October 21	Franklin (IN)	Eclipse Park; Louisville, KY	L 6–27	
October 28	at Centre	Cheek Field; Danville, KY	L 7–32	
November 4	Cincinnati JV	Eclipse Park; Louisville, KY	W 28–0	
November 11	at Rose Poly	Terre Haute, IN	W 6–0	
November 18	Centenary	Eclipse Park; Louisville, KY	L 13–39	
November 30	at Marshall	Marshall Field; Huntington, WV	L 7–21	
