= 1922 VMI Keydets football team =

American college football season

1922 VMI Keydets football
- Conference: Independent
- Record: 7–2
- Head coach: Blandy Clarkson (3rd season)
- Home stadium: Alumni Field

1922 Southern college football independents records
	Conf.			Overall
Team	W	L	T	W		L		T
West Virginia		–		10	–	0	–	1
Tennessee Docs		–		7	–	0	–	1
Western Kentucky State Normal		–		9	–	1	–	0
Trinity (NC)		–		7	–	2	–	1
VMI		–		7	–	2	–	0
Abilene Christian		–		6	–	2	–	0
Richmond		–		6	–	2	–	1
West Tennessee State Normal		–		5	–	2	–	3
Navy		–		5	–	2	–	0
Delaware		–		6	–	3	–	0
Stetson		–		4	–	2	–	0
William & Mary		–		6	–	3	–	0
Georgetown		–		6	–	3	–	1
Marion		–		5	–	4	–	1
East Tennessee		–		5	–	4	–	0
Marshall		–		5	–	4	–	0
Roanoke		–		5	–	4	–	0
Texas Mines		–		5	–	4	–	0
Loyola (LA)		–		4	–	3	–	1
Spring Hill		–		4	–	4	–	0
Sam Houston Normal		–		3	–	4	–	0
Wake Forest		–		3	–	5	–	2
Davidson		–		2	–	6	–	2
Catholic University		–		2	–	6	–	0
George Washington		–		2	–	6	–	0
Middle Tennessee State Normal		–		2	–	6	–	0
Mississippi Normal		–		2	–	6	–	0
Louisville		–		2	–	7	–	0
Birmingham–Southern		–		1	–	6	–	1
Erskine		–		0	–	8	–	0

The 1922 VMI Keydets football team was an American football team that represented the Virginia Military Institute (VMI) during the 1922 college football season as an independent. In their third year under head coach Blandy Clarkson, the team compiled an overall record of 7–2.

== Schedule ==
Date	Opponent	Site	Result	Attendance	Source
September 23	Lynchburg	Alumni Field; Lexington, VA	W 34–7		
October 7	Roanoke	Alumni Field; Lexington, VA	W 50–0		
October 14	Morris Harvey	Alumni Field; Lexington, VA	W 62–0		
October 21	at Virginia	Lambeth Field; Charlottesville, VA	W 14–0	11,000	
October 28	vs. NC State	Norfolk, VA	W 14–0		
November 4	Catholic University	Alumni Field; Lexington, VA	W 61–0		
November 11	vs. North Carolina	Mayo Island Park; Richmond, VA	L 7–9	12,000	
November 18	at George Washington	Wilson Memorial Stadium; Washington, DC	W 45–0		
November 30	vs. VPI	Fair Grounds; Roanoke, VA (rivalry)	L 3–7	12,000–16,000	
