= 1922 William & Mary Indians football team =

American college football season

1922 William & Mary Indians football
- Conference: Independent
- Record: 6–3
- Head coach: Bill Ingram (1st season)
- Captain: F. Chandler

1922 Southern college football independents records
	Conf.			Overall
Team	W	L	T	W		L		T
West Virginia		–		10	–	0	–	1
Tennessee Docs		–		7	–	0	–	1
Western Kentucky State Normal		–		9	–	1	–	0
Trinity (NC)		–		7	–	2	–	1
VMI		–		7	–	2	–	0
Richmond		–		6	–	2	–	1
West Tennessee State Normal		–		5	–	2	–	3
Navy		–		5	–	2	–	0
Delaware		–		6	–	3	–	0
Stetson		–		4	–	2	–	0
William & Mary		–		6	–	3	–	0
Georgetown		–		6	–	3	–	1
Marion		–		5	–	4	–	1
East Tennessee		–		5	–	4	–	0
Marshall		–		5	–	4	–	0
Roanoke		–		5	–	4	–	0
Texas Mines		–		5	–	4	–	0
Loyola (LA)		–		4	–	3	–	1
Spring Hill		–		4	–	4	–	0
Sam Houston Normal		–		3	–	4	–	0
Wake Forest		–		3	–	5	–	2
Davidson		–		2	–	6	–	2
Catholic University		–		2	–	6	–	0
George Washington		–		2	–	6	–	0
Middle Tennessee State Normal		–		2	–	6	–	0
Mississippi Normal		–		2	–	6	–	0
Louisville		–		2	–	7	–	0
Birmingham–Southern		–		1	–	6	–	1
Erskine		–		0	–	8	–	0

The 1922 William & Mary Indians football team represented the College of William & Mary as an independent during the 1922 college football season. Led by Bill Ingram in his first and only season as head coach, the Indians compiled a record of 6–3.

== Schedule ==
Date	Opponent	Site	Result	Attendance	Source
September 30	at Penn State	New Beaver Field; State College, PA	L 7–27	3,000	
October 7	at VPI	Miles Field; Blacksburg, VA	L 6–20		
October 14	Randolph–Macon	Williamsburg, VA	W 33–7		
October 21	vs. Trinity (NC)	Norfolk, VA	W 13–7		
October 28	vs. Hampden–Sydney	Richmond, VA	W 32–6		
November 4	vs. Wake Forest	League Park; Norfolk, VA	W 18–0		
November 11	Roanoke	Williamsburg, VA	W 14–0		
November 18	vs. Gallaudet	Newport News, VA	W 45–0		
November 30	Richmond	Williamsburg, VA (rivalry)	L 3–13		
