= 1922 Marion Cadets football team =

American college football season

1922 Marion Cadets football
- Conference: Independent
- Record: 5–4–1
- Head coach: Coach Wilkie

1922 Southern college football independents records
	Conf.			Overall
Team	W	L	T	W		L		T
West Virginia		–		10	–	0	–	1
Tennessee Docs		–		7	–	0	–	1
Western Kentucky State Normal		–		9	–	1	–	0
Trinity (NC)		–		7	–	2	–	1
VMI		–		7	–	2	–	0
Richmond		–		6	–	2	–	1
West Tennessee State Normal		–		5	–	2	–	3
Navy		–		5	–	2	–	0
Delaware		–		6	–	3	–	0
William & Mary		–		6	–	3	–	0
Georgetown		–		6	–	3	–	1
Marion		–		5	–	4	–	1
East Tennessee		–		5	–	4	–	0
Marshall		–		5	–	4	–	0
Roanoke		–		5	–	4	–	0
Texas Mines		–		5	–	4	–	0
Loyola (LA)		–		4	–	3	–	1
Spring Hill		–		4	–	4	–	0
Sam Houston Normal		–		3	–	4	–	0
Wake Forest		–		3	–	5	–	2
Davidson		–		2	–	6	–	2
Catholic University		–		2	–	6	–	0
George Washington		–		2	–	6	–	0
Middle Tennessee State Normal		–		2	–	6	–	0
Mississippi Normal		–		2	–	6	–	0
Louisville		–		2	–	7	–	0
Birmingham–Southern		–		1	–	6	–	1
Erskine		–		0	–	8	–	0

The 1922 Marion Cadets football team was an American football team that represented the Marion Military Institute as an independent during the 1922 college football season. The Cadets compiled an overall record of 5–4–1.

== Schedule ==
Date	Opponent	Site	Result	Source
September 23	at Auburn	Drake Field; Auburn, Alabama	L 0–61	
September 30	at Alabama	Denny Field; Tuscaloosa, AL	L 0–110	
October 7	at Howard (AL)	Rickwood Field; Birmingham, AL	T 0–0	
October 14	Wetumpka Aggies	Marion, AL	W 46–0	
October 21	at Spring Hill	Mobile, AL	L 18–31	
October 28	Selma YMCA	Marion, AL	W 46–0	
November 4	Jacksonville State	Marion, AL	W 18–7	
November 9	at Selma YMCA	Robbins Field; Selma, AL	W 56–0	
November 17	Mississippi Normal	Marion, AL	W 44–0	
November 30	at Loyola (LA)	New Orleans, LA	L 6–34	
