= 1922 Texas Mines Miners football team =

American college football season

1922 Texas Mines Miners football
- Conference: Independent
- Record: 5–4
- Head coach: Jack C. Vowell (1st season)

1922 Southern college football independents records
	Conf.			Overall
Team	W	L	T	W		L		T
West Virginia		–		10	–	0	–	1
Tennessee Docs		–		7	–	0	–	1
Western Kentucky State Normal		–		9	–	1	–	0
Trinity (NC)		–		7	–	2	–	1
VMI		–		7	–	2	–	0
Richmond		–		6	–	2	–	1
West Tennessee State Normal		–		5	–	2	–	3
Navy		–		5	–	2	–	0
Delaware		–		6	–	3	–	0
Stetson		–		4	–	2	–	0
William & Mary		–		6	–	3	–	0
Georgetown		–		6	–	3	–	1
Marion		–		5	–	4	–	1
East Tennessee		–		5	–	4	–	0
Marshall		–		5	–	4	–	0
Roanoke		–		5	–	4	–	0
Texas Mines		–		5	–	4	–	0
Loyola (LA)		–		4	–	3	–	1
Spring Hill		–		4	–	4	–	0
Sam Houston Normal		–		3	–	4	–	0
Wake Forest		–		3	–	5	–	2
Davidson		–		2	–	6	–	2
Catholic University		–		2	–	6	–	0
George Washington		–		2	–	6	–	0
Middle Tennessee State Normal		–		2	–	6	–	0
Mississippi Normal		–		2	–	6	–	0
Louisville		–		2	–	7	–	0
Birmingham–Southern		–		1	–	6	–	1
Erskine		–		0	–	8	–	0

The 1922 Texas Mines Miners football team was an American football team that represented the Texas School of Mines (now known as the University of Texas at El Paso) as an independent during the 1922 college football season. In its first season under head coach Jack C. Vowell, the team compiled a 5–4 record and was outscored by a total of 157 to 102.

== Schedule ==
Date	Opponent	Site	Result	Source
October 6	Commercial Club	El Paso, TX	L 6–7	
October 14	El Paso JC	El Paso, TX	W 58–0	
October 21	Lower Valley	El Paso, TX	W 40–0	
October 28	at New Mexico	Varsity field; Albuquerque, NM	L 0–13	
November 4	New Mexico Military	El Paso, TX	W 12–0	
November 11	at New Mexico A&M	Miller Field; Las Cruces, NM (rivalry)	L 0–64	
November 18	8th Cavalry	El Paso, TX	W 38–0	
November 23	Daniel Baker	El Paso, TX	W 3–0	
December 3	Arizona	El Paso, TX	L 0–18	
