= 1922 Loyola Wolf Pack football team =

American college football season

1922 Loyola Wolf Pack football
- Conference: Independent
- Record: 4–3–1
- Head coach: William Flynn (2nd season)
- Home stadium: Heinemann Park

1922 Southern college football independents records
	Conf.			Overall
Team	W	L	T	W		L		T
West Virginia		–		10	–	0	–	1
Tennessee Docs		–		7	–	0	–	1
Western Kentucky State Normal		–		9	–	1	–	0
Trinity (NC)		–		7	–	2	–	1
VMI		–		7	–	2	–	0
Abilene Christian		–		6	–	2	–	0
Richmond		–		6	–	2	–	1
West Tennessee State Normal		–		5	–	2	–	3
Navy		–		5	–	2	–	0
Delaware		–		6	–	3	–	0
Stetson		–		4	–	2	–	0
William & Mary		–		6	–	3	–	0
Georgetown		–		6	–	3	–	1
Marion		–		5	–	4	–	1
East Tennessee		–		5	–	4	–	0
Marshall		–		5	–	4	–	0
Roanoke		–		5	–	4	–	0
Texas Mines		–		5	–	4	–	0
Loyola (LA)		–		4	–	3	–	1
Spring Hill		–		4	–	4	–	0
Sam Houston Normal		–		3	–	4	–	0
Wake Forest		–		3	–	5	–	2
Davidson		–		2	–	6	–	2
Catholic University		–		2	–	6	–	0
George Washington		–		2	–	6	–	0
Middle Tennessee State Normal		–		2	–	6	–	0
Mississippi Normal		–		2	–	6	–	0
Louisville		–		2	–	7	–	0
Birmingham–Southern		–		1	–	6	–	1
Erskine		–		0	–	8	–	0

The 1922 Loyola Wolf Pack football team was an American football team that represented Loyola College of New Orleans (now known as Loyola University New Orleans) as an independent during the 1922 college football season. In its second season under head coach William Flynn, the team compiled a 4–3–1 record and outscored opponents by a total of 130 to 111.

== Schedule ==
Date	Opponent	Site	Result	Attendance	Source
October 7	at LSU	State Field; Baton Rouge, LA	W 7–0	4,500	
October 15	Jefferson (LA)	New Orleans, LA	W 60–0		
October 21	at Southwestern Louisiana	Girard Field; Lafayette, LA	T 9–9		
October 28	at Spring Hill	Maxon Field; Mobile, AL	L 0–14		
November 4	at Centenary	Centenary Athletic Field; Shreveport, LA	L 0–48	2,500	
November 11	Mississippi Normal	New Orleans, LA	W 20–6		
November 25	Saint Louis	Heinemann Park; New Orleans, LA	L 0–28		
November 30	Marion	New Orleans, LA	W 34–6		
