= 1922 Georgetown Blue and Gray football team =

American college football season

1922 Georgetown Blue and Gray football
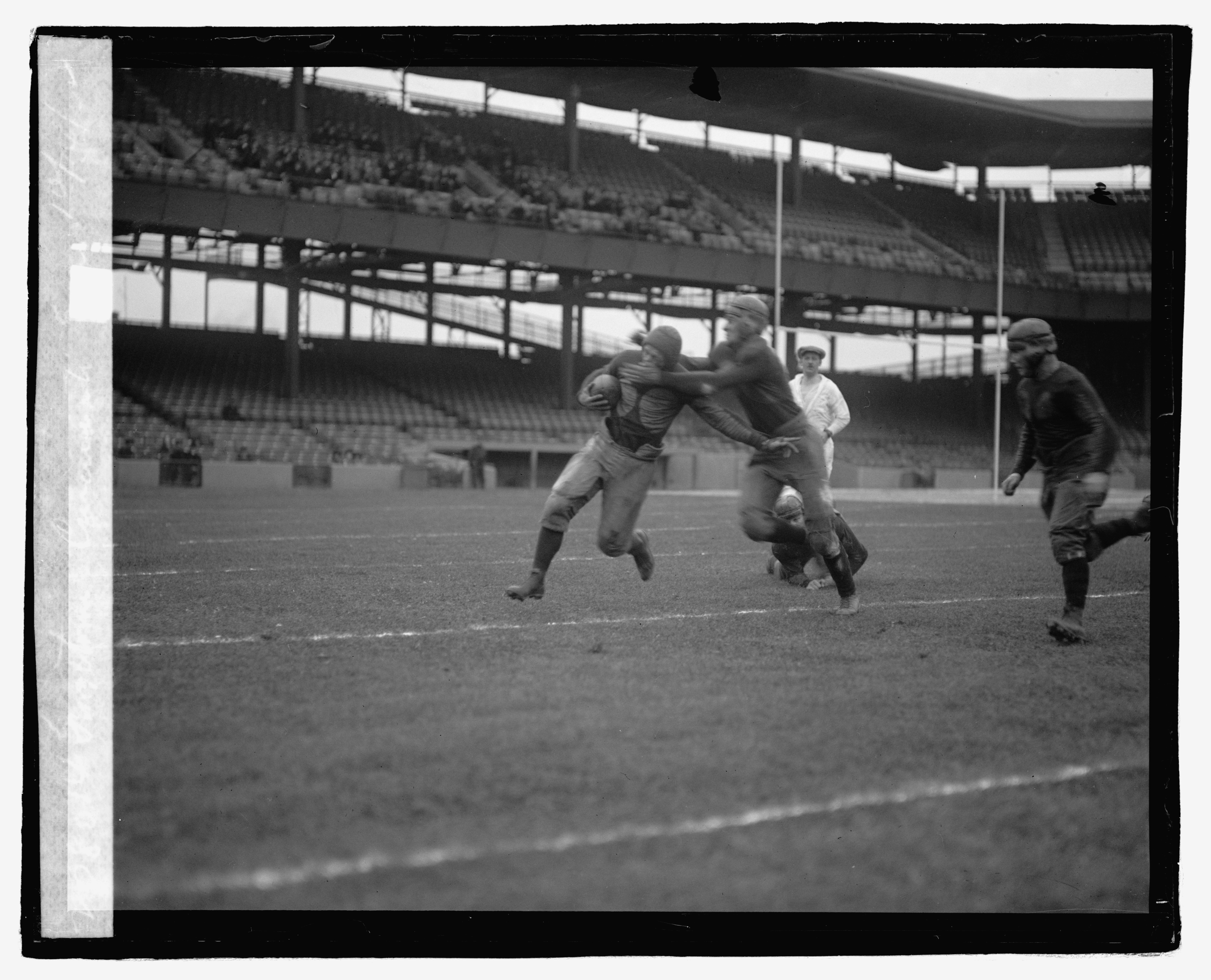
- Georgetown and Cincinnati game
- Conference: Independent
- Record: 6–3–1
- Head coach: Albert Exendine (9th season)
- Captain: Rudy Comstock
- Home stadium: American League Park

1922 Southern college football independents records
	Conf.			Overall
Team	W	L	T	W		L		T
West Virginia		–		10	–	0	–	1
Tennessee Docs		–		7	–	0	–	1
Western Kentucky State Normal		–		9	–	1	–	0
Trinity (NC)		–		7	–	2	–	1
VMI		–		7	–	2	–	0
Abilene Christian		–		6	–	2	–	0
Richmond		–		6	–	2	–	1
West Tennessee State Normal		–		5	–	2	–	3
Navy		–		5	–	2	–	0
Delaware		–		6	–	3	–	0
Stetson		–		4	–	2	–	0
William & Mary		–		6	–	3	–	0
Georgetown		–		6	–	3	–	1
Marion		–		5	–	4	–	1
East Tennessee		–		5	–	4	–	0
Marshall		–		5	–	4	–	0
Roanoke		–		5	–	4	–	0
Texas Mines		–		5	–	4	–	0
Loyola (LA)		–		4	–	3	–	1
Spring Hill		–		4	–	4	–	0
Sam Houston Normal		–		3	–	4	–	0
Wake Forest		–		3	–	5	–	2
Davidson		–		2	–	6	–	2
Catholic University		–		2	–	6	–	0
George Washington		–		2	–	6	–	0
Middle Tennessee State Normal		–		2	–	6	–	0
Mississippi Normal		–		2	–	6	–	0
Louisville		–		2	–	7	–	0
Birmingham–Southern		–		1	–	6	–	1
Erskine		–		0	–	8	–	0

The 1922 Georgetown Blue and Gray football team represented Georgetown University as an independent during the 1922 college football season. Led by Albert Exendine in his ninth and final year as head coach, the team went 6–3–1.

== Schedule ==
Date	Time	Opponent	Site	Result	Attendance	Source
October 7		Lebanon Valley	American League Park; Washington, DC	W 19–6		
October 14		Cincinnati	American League Park; Washington, DC	W 37–0		
October 21		at Fordham	Polo Grounds; New York, NY	W 28–13	9,000	
October 28		Quantico Marines	American League Park; Washington, DC	L 6–9		
November 4		Holy Cross	American League Park; Washington, DC	L 0–10		
November 11		at Georgia Tech	Grant Field; Atlanta, GA	L 7–19		
November 18		Bucknell	American League Park; Washington, DC	W 19–7		
November 25	2:00 p.m.	at Boston College	Braves Field; Boston, MA	T 0–0		
November 30		George Washington	American League Park; Washington, DC	W 46–6		
December 2		Lafayette	American League Park; Washington, DC	W 13–7		
