= 1922 Marshall Thundering Herd football team =

American college football season

1922 Marshall Thundering Herd football
- Conference: Independent
- Record: 5–4
- Head coach: Skeeter Shelton (2nd season)
- Captain: Edward Dobbs
- Home stadium: Central Field

1922 Southern college football independents records
	Conf.			Overall
Team	W	L	T	W		L		T
West Virginia		–		10	–	0	–	1
Tennessee Docs		–		7	–	0	–	1
Western Kentucky State Normal		–		9	–	1	–	0
Trinity (NC)		–		7	–	2	–	1
VMI		–		7	–	2	–	0
Abilene Christian		–		6	–	2	–	0
Richmond		–		6	–	2	–	1
West Tennessee State Normal		–		5	–	2	–	3
Navy		–		5	–	2	–	0
Tennessee State		–		3	–	1	–	1
Delaware		–		6	–	3	–	0
Stetson		–		4	–	2	–	0
William & Mary		–		6	–	3	–	0
Georgetown		–		6	–	3	–	1
Marion		–		5	–	4	–	1
East Tennessee		–		5	–	4	–	0
Marshall		–		5	–	4	–	0
Roanoke		–		5	–	4	–	0
Texas Mines		–		5	–	4	–	0
Loyola (LA)		–		4	–	3	–	1
Spring Hill		–		4	–	4	–	0
Sam Houston Normal		–		3	–	4	–	0
Wake Forest		–		3	–	5	–	2
Davidson		–		2	–	6	–	2
Catholic University		–		2	–	6	–	0
George Washington		–		2	–	6	–	0
Middle Tennessee State Normal		–		2	–	6	–	0
Mississippi Normal		–		2	–	6	–	0
Louisville		–		2	–	7	–	0
Birmingham–Southern		–		1	–	6	–	1
Erskine		–		0	–	8	–	0

The 1922 Marshall Thundering Herd football team represented Marshall College (now Marshall University) as an independent during the 1922 college football season. Marshall posted a 5–4 record, outscoring its opposition 226–100. Home games were played on a campus field called "Central Field" which is presently Campus Commons.

== Schedule ==
Date	Opponent	Site	Result
September 23	Broaddus	Central Field; Huntington, WV	W 71–6
September 30	at Kentucky	Stoll Field; Lexington, KY	L 0–16
October 7	Transylvania	Central Field; Huntington, WV	W 56–0
October 14	Marietta	Central Field; Huntington, WV	L 0–14
October 27	West Virginia Wesleyan	Central Field; Huntington, WV	L 21–48
November 4	Georgetown (KY)	Central Field; Huntington, WV	W 30–0
November 10	at Rio Grande	Rio Grande, OH	W 27–3
November 18	at Muskingum	New Concord, OH	L 0–6
November 30	Louisville^{†}	Central Field; Huntington, WV	W 21–7
^{†}Homecoming
