= 1922 Delaware Fightin' Blue Hens football team =

American college football season

1922 Delaware Fightin' Blue Hens football
- Conference: Independent
- Record: 5–3–1
- Head coach: William McAvoy (1st season)
- Home stadium: Frazer Field

1922 Southern college football independents records
	Conf.			Overall
Team	W	L	T	W		L		T
West Virginia		–		10	–	0	–	1
Tennessee Docs		–		7	–	0	–	1
Western Kentucky State Normal		–		9	–	1	–	0
Trinity (NC)		–		7	–	2	–	1
VMI		–		7	–	2	–	0
Richmond		–		6	–	2	–	1
West Tennessee State Normal		–		5	–	2	–	3
Navy		–		5	–	2	–	0
Delaware		–		6	–	3	–	0
Stetson		–		4	–	2	–	0
William & Mary		–		6	–	3	–	0
Georgetown		–		6	–	3	–	1
Marion		–		5	–	4	–	1
East Tennessee		–		5	–	4	–	0
Marshall		–		5	–	4	–	0
Roanoke		–		5	–	4	–	0
Texas Mines		–		5	–	4	–	0
Loyola (LA)		–		4	–	3	–	1
Spring Hill		–		4	–	4	–	0
Sam Houston Normal		–		3	–	4	–	0
Wake Forest		–		3	–	5	–	2
Davidson		–		2	–	6	–	2
Catholic University		–		2	–	6	–	0
George Washington		–		2	–	6	–	0
Middle Tennessee State Normal		–		2	–	6	–	0
Mississippi Normal		–		2	–	6	–	0
Louisville		–		2	–	7	–	0
Birmingham–Southern		–		1	–	6	–	1
Erskine		–		0	–	8	–	0

The 1922 Delaware Fightin' Blue Hens football team was an American football team that represented the University of Delaware in the 1922 college football season. In their first season under head coach William McAvoy, the Blue Hens compiled a 5–3–1 record and were outscored by a total of 84 to 42. The team played its home games at Frazer Field in Newark, Delaware.

== Schedule ==
Date	Opponent	Site	Result	Attendance	Source
September 30	Saint Joseph's	Frazer Field; Newark, DE	T 7–7		
October 7	at Muhlenberg	Allentown, PA	L 0–12		
October 14	Ursinus	Frazer Field; Newark, DE	W 12–0		
October 21	at Rhode Island State	Kingston, RI	L 0–7		
October 28	at Pennsylvania Military	Chester, PA	L 2–6		
November 4	at Stevens	Hoboken, NJ	W 7–0		
November 11	Haverford	Frazer Field; Newark, DE	W 28–7		
November 18	Washington College	Frazer Field; Newark, DE	W 7–3		
November 25	vs. Dickinson	Wilmington, DE	W 21–0		
