= 1922 Navy Midshipmen football team =

American college football season

1922 Navy Midshipmen football
- Conference: Independent
- Record: 5–2
- Head coach: Bob Folwell (3rd season)
- Captain: Vincent Conroy
- Home stadium: Worden Field

1922 Southern college football independents records
	Conf.			Overall
Team	W	L	T	W		L		T
West Virginia		–		10	–	0	–	1
Tennessee Docs		–		7	–	0	–	1
Western Kentucky State Normal		–		9	–	1	–	0
Trinity (NC)		–		7	–	2	–	1
VMI		–		7	–	2	–	0
Richmond		–		6	–	2	–	1
West Tennessee State Normal		–		5	–	2	–	3
Navy		–		5	–	2	–	0
Delaware		–		6	–	3	–	0
Stetson		–		4	–	2	–	0
William & Mary		–		6	–	3	–	0
Georgetown		–		6	–	3	–	1
Marion		–		5	–	4	–	1
East Tennessee		–		5	–	4	–	0
Marshall		–		5	–	4	–	0
Roanoke		–		5	–	4	–	0
Texas Mines		–		5	–	4	–	0
Loyola (LA)		–		4	–	3	–	1
Spring Hill		–		4	–	4	–	0
Sam Houston Normal		–		3	–	4	–	0
Wake Forest		–		3	–	5	–	2
Davidson		–		2	–	6	–	2
Catholic University		–		2	–	6	–	0
George Washington		–		2	–	6	–	0
Middle Tennessee State Normal		–		2	–	6	–	0
Mississippi Normal		–		2	–	6	–	0
Louisville		–		2	–	7	–	0
Birmingham–Southern		–		1	–	6	–	1
Erskine		–		0	–	8	–	0

The 1922 Navy Midshipmen football team represented the United States Naval Academy during the 1922 college football season. In their third season under head coach Bob Folwell, the Midshipmen compiled a 5–2 record, shut out four opponents, and outscored all opponents by a combined score of 185 to 37.

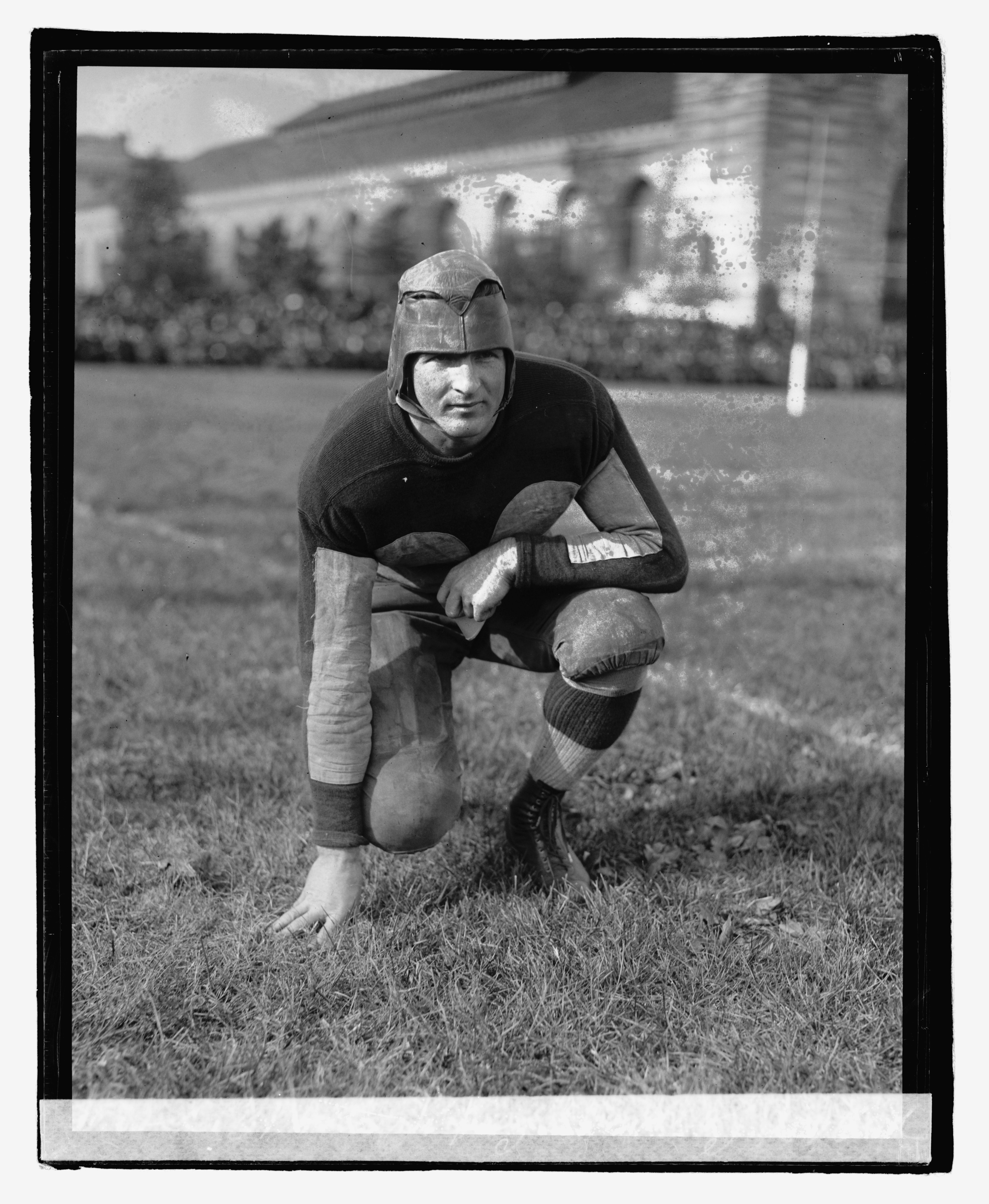
Captain Vincent Conroy

The annual Army–Navy Game was played on November 25 at Franklin Field in Philadelphia; Army won 17–14.

== Schedule ==
Date	Opponent	Site	Result	Attendance	Source
October 7	Western Reserve	Worden Field; Annapolis, MD	W 71–0		
October 14	Bucknell	Worden Field; Annapolis, MD	W 14–7		
October 21	Georgia Tech	Worden Field; Annapolis, MD	W 13–0	20,000	
October 28	at Penn	Franklin Field; Philadelphia, PA	L 7–13		
November 3	vs. Penn State	American League Park; Washington, DC	W 14–0	30,000	
November 11	St. Xavier	Worden Field; Annapolis, MD	W 52–0		
November 25	vs. Army	Franklin Field; Philadelphia, PA (Army–Navy Game)	L 14–17		
