= 1922 Roanoke Maroons football team =

American college football season

1922 Roanoke Maroons football
- Conference: Independent
- Record: 5–4
- Head coach: Pinky Spruhan (9th season)
- Home stadium: College Field

1922 Southern college football independents records
	Conf.			Overall
Team	W	L	T	W		L		T
West Virginia		–		10	–	0	–	1
Tennessee Docs		–		7	–	0	–	1
Western Kentucky State Normal		–		9	–	1	–	0
Trinity (NC)		–		7	–	2	–	1
VMI		–		7	–	2	–	0
Abilene Christian		–		6	–	2	–	0
Richmond		–		6	–	2	–	1
West Tennessee State Normal		–		5	–	2	–	3
Navy		–		5	–	2	–	0
Delaware		–		6	–	3	–	0
Stetson		–		4	–	2	–	0
William & Mary		–		6	–	3	–	0
Georgetown		–		6	–	3	–	1
Marion		–		5	–	4	–	1
East Tennessee		–		5	–	4	–	0
Marshall		–		5	–	4	–	0
Roanoke		–		5	–	4	–	0
Texas Mines		–		5	–	4	–	0
Loyola (LA)		–		4	–	3	–	1
Spring Hill		–		4	–	4	–	0
Sam Houston Normal		–		3	–	4	–	0
Wake Forest		–		3	–	5	–	2
Davidson		–		2	–	6	–	2
Catholic University		–		2	–	6	–	0
George Washington		–		2	–	6	–	0
Middle Tennessee State Normal		–		2	–	6	–	0
Mississippi Normal		–		2	–	6	–	0
Louisville		–		2	–	7	–	0
Birmingham–Southern		–		1	–	6	–	1
Erskine		–		0	–	8	–	0

The 1922 Roanoke Maroons football team represented Roanoke College as an independent during the 1922 college football season. Led by ninth-year head coach Pinky Spruhan, the Maroons compiled an overall record of 5–4.

== Schedule ==
Date	Opponent	Site	Result	Source
September 30	Randolph-Macon Academy	College Field; Salem, VA	W 187–0	
October 7	at VMI	Alumni Field; Lexington, VA	L 0–50	
October 14	at NC State	Riddick Stadium; Raleigh, NC	L 0–13	
October 21	at Richmond	Stadium Field; Richmond, VA	L 0–6	
October 27	King	College Field; Salem, VA	W 20–13	
November 3	Hampden–Sydney	College Field; Salem, VA	W 14–0	
November 11	at William & Mary	Cary Field; Williamsburg, VA	L 0–14	
November 18	Guilford	College Field; Salem, VA	W 68–0	
November 25	Elon	College Field; Salem, VA	W 63–0	
