= 1922 Tennessee Docs football team =

American college football season

1922 Tennessee Docs football
- Conference: Independent
- Record: 7–0–1
- Head coach: Bill Brennan (1st season)
- Home stadium: Russwood Park

1922 Southern college football independents records
	Conf.			Overall
Team	W	L	T	W		L		T
West Virginia		–		10	–	0	–	1
Tennessee Docs		–		7	–	0	–	1
Western Kentucky State Normal		–		9	–	1	–	0
Trinity (NC)		–		7	–	2	–	1
VMI		–		7	–	2	–	0
Abilene Christian		–		6	–	2	–	0
Richmond		–		6	–	2	–	1
West Tennessee State Normal		–		5	–	2	–	3
Navy		–		5	–	2	–	0
Delaware		–		6	–	3	–	0
Stetson		–		4	–	2	–	0
William & Mary		–		6	–	3	–	0
Georgetown		–		6	–	3	–	1
Marion		–		5	–	4	–	1
East Tennessee		–		5	–	4	–	0
Marshall		–		5	–	4	–	0
Roanoke		–		5	–	4	–	0
Texas Mines		–		5	–	4	–	0
Loyola (LA)		–		4	–	3	–	1
Spring Hill		–		4	–	4	–	0
Sam Houston Normal		–		3	–	4	–	0
Wake Forest		–		3	–	5	–	2
Davidson		–		2	–	6	–	2
Catholic University		–		2	–	6	–	0
George Washington		–		2	–	6	–	0
Middle Tennessee State Normal		–		2	–	6	–	0
Mississippi Normal		–		2	–	6	–	0
Louisville		–		2	–	7	–	0
Birmingham–Southern		–		1	–	6	–	1
Erskine		–		0	–	8	–	0

The 1922 Tennessee Docs football team (variously "Docs", "UT Doctors" or the "Tennessee Medicos") represented the University of Tennessee College of Medicine in Memphis in the 1922 college football season. The game against Washington University scheduled for Armistice Day was canceled due to a lack of eligible players.

== Schedule ==
Date	Opponent	Site	Result	Attendance	Source
October 7	Southwestern Presbyterian	Russwood Park; Memphis, TN	W 45–0		
October 14	at Union (TN)	Jackson Athletic Park; Jackson, TN	T 7–7		
October 21	at Centenary	Louisiana State Fairgrounds; Shreveport, LA	W 14–0		
October 28	Kirksville Osteopaths	Russwood Park; Memphis, TN	W 28–0		
November 4	Chattanooga	Russwood Park; Memphis, TN	W 19–0	3,500	
November 18	Ole Miss	Russwood Park; Memphis, TN	W 32–0		
November 25	Missouri Mines	Russwood Park; Memphis, TN	W 54–6	2,000	
December 2	Wabash	Russwood Park; Memphis, TN	W 14–7	3,000	
