= Tupelo Military Institute =

Coordinates: 34.263°N 88.721°W

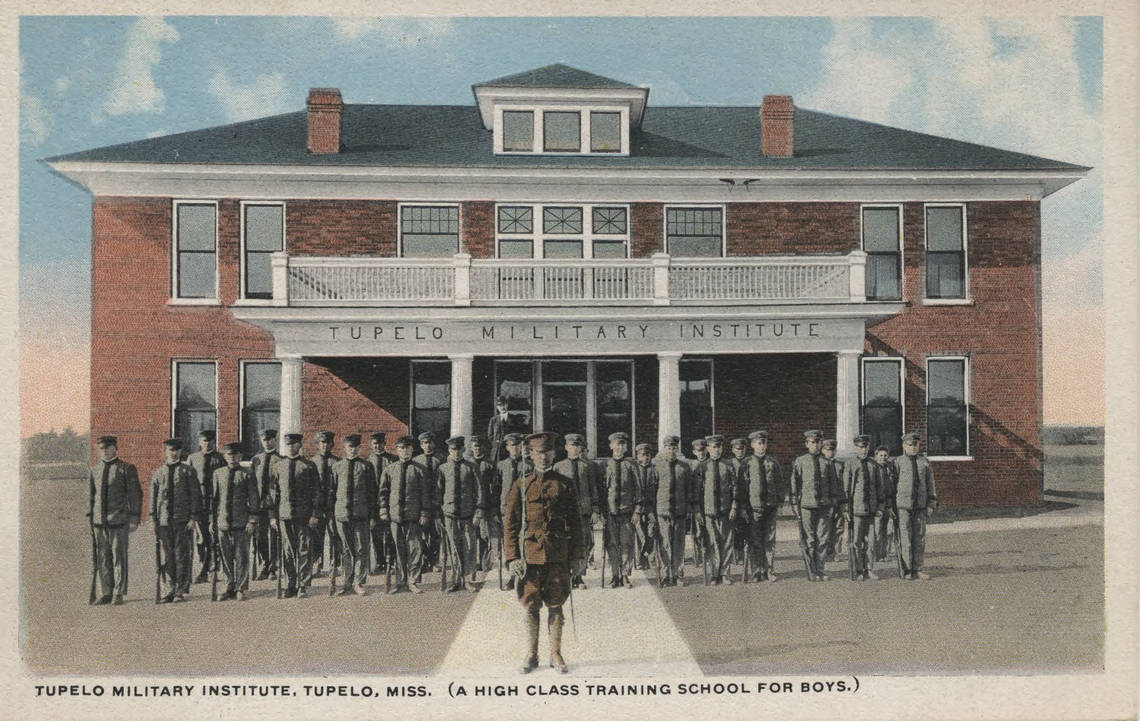
- A postcard of the school from 1914
- Tupelo, Mississippi; United States

Information
- School type: Military academy, boarding school
- Motto: We build the man
- Established: 1913
- Founder: George Washington Chapman
- Status: Closed
- Closed: 1936
- Enrollment: 70+ (1936)
- Campus size: 16-acre (65,000 m^{2})
- Mascot: Black and Red Tigers

Tupelo Military Institute was a college-preparatory military school in Tupelo, Mississippi, designed to prepare boys for entrance to college or university. Founded in 1913 by George Washington Chapman, it closed in 1936.

The 1920s have been hailed as the "boom years," when the dormitories were filled and the school received full accreditation by the Southern Association of Schools and Colleges. In 1928, it became a member of the United States Association of Military Schools and was recognized for its outstanding curriculum.

In addition to daily military drills, athletics played an important role. All major sports were offered, including football, baseball, basketball, track, tennis, swimming, boxing, and wrestling. Perhaps the school's most famous athlete was Guy Bush. Bush pitched the baseball team to success. In 1923, he was signed by the Chicago Cubs and won a game for them in the 1929 World Series, though the team lost the championship to the Philadelphia Athletics. In the 1932 season, Bush was a 19-game winner.

On September 25, 1927, a fire, possibly caused by faulty wiring, destroyed the school's main dormitory. A new dorm, utilizing much of the ground-floor structure of the original, was finished by Christmas.

In early 1936, after a visit with local banking officials, Chapman decided to sell the 16-acre campus to the city of Tupelo to be used as a state-sponsored junior college. On April 5, 1936, the campus was not damaged and the cadets were unharmed by the 1936 Tupelo–Gainesville tornado outbreak, one of the most destructive in state history.

As of 2007, there are some visible signs of the former campus in West Tupelo on Clayton Avenue, bordered on the south by Blair Street and on the north by West Jackson Street. In the few buildings that do remain are housed the Inspirational Community Baptist Church and some apartments.
