= 1922 Sam Houston Normal Bear Cats football team =

American college football season

1922 Sam Houston Normal football
- Conference: Independent
- Record: 3–4
- Head coach: Mutt Gee (3rd season)
- Home stadium: Pritchett Field

1922 Southern college football independents records
	Conf.			Overall
Team	W	L	T	W		L		T
West Virginia		–		10	–	0	–	1
Tennessee Docs		–		7	–	0	–	1
Western Kentucky State Normal		–		9	–	1	–	0
Trinity (NC)		–		7	–	2	–	1
VMI		–		7	–	2	–	0
Abilene Christian		–		6	–	2	–	0
Richmond		–		6	–	2	–	1
West Tennessee State Normal		–		5	–	2	–	3
Navy		–		5	–	2	–	0
Delaware		–		6	–	3	–	0
Stetson		–		4	–	2	–	0
William & Mary		–		6	–	3	–	0
Georgetown		–		6	–	3	–	1
Marion		–		5	–	4	–	1
East Tennessee		–		5	–	4	–	0
Marshall		–		5	–	4	–	0
Roanoke		–		5	–	4	–	0
Texas Mines		–		5	–	4	–	0
Loyola (LA)		–		4	–	3	–	1
Spring Hill		–		4	–	4	–	0
Sam Houston Normal		–		3	–	4	–	0
Wake Forest		–		3	–	5	–	2
Davidson		–		2	–	6	–	2
Catholic University		–		2	–	6	–	0
George Washington		–		2	–	6	–	0
Middle Tennessee State Normal		–		2	–	6	–	0
Mississippi Normal		–		2	–	6	–	0
Louisville		–		2	–	7	–	0
Birmingham–Southern		–		1	–	6	–	1
Erskine		–		0	–	8	–	0

The 1922 Sam Houston Normal Bear Cats football team represented Sam Houston Normal Institute (now known as Sam Houston State University) as an independent during the 1923 college football season. Led by third-year head coach Mutt Gee, Sam Houston compiled an overall record of 3–4.

== Schedule ==
Date	Opponent	Site	Result	Source
October 7	at Rice	Rice Field; Houston, TX	L 3–23	
October 13	Baylor Irregulars	Pritchett Field; Huntsville, TX	L 0–7	
October 21	at Southwest Texas State	Evans Field; San Marcos, TX (rivalry)	L 0–22	
October 28	Rice freshmen	Pritchett Field; Huntsville, TX	W 38–0	
November 11	Texas A&M Irregulars	Pritchett Field; Huntsville, TX	W 7–0	
November 18	Conroe High School	Pritchett Field; Huntsville, TX	W 19–0	
November 25	Texas A&M freshmen	Pritchett Field; Huntsville, TX	L 0–29	
