= 1922 college football season =

American college football season

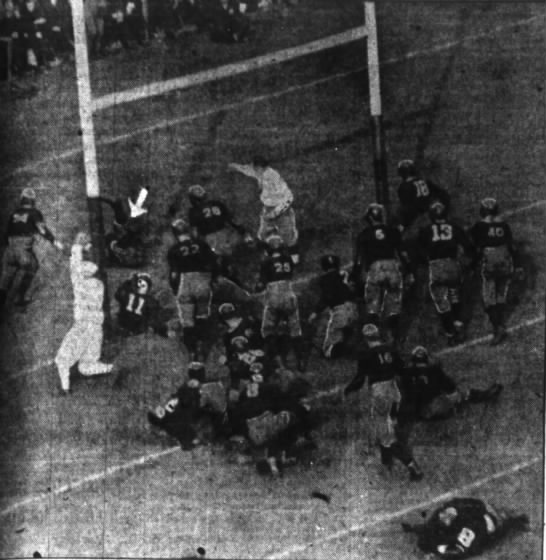
- Image of pivotal play in Princeton–Chicago game
- Number of bowls: 2
- Bowl games: December 25, 1922 – January 1, 1923
- Champion(s): California; Cornell; Princeton

The 1922 college football season had a number of unbeaten and untied teams, and no clear-cut champion, with the Official NCAA Division I Football Records Book listing California, Cornell, Iowa, Princeton, and Vanderbilt as national champions. California, Cornell, and Princeton were all picked by multiple selectors.

Andy Smith's Pacific Coast Conference champion "Wonder Team" at California continued on its streak since 1920. Eastern power Cornell was coached by Gil Dobie and led by one of the sport's great backfields with George Pfann, Eddie Kaw, Floyd Ramsey, and Charles E. Cassidy. Bill Roper's Princeton team was dubbed the "team of destiny" by Grantland Rice after defeating Chicago 21–18 in the first game nationally broadcast on radio. Today, college football on radio is common for nearly every game in every division. On the same day, Cal defeated USC at the dedication of Rose Bowl Stadium.

The Southern Conference would begin its first season of football in 1922. Vanderbilt tied with North Carolina and Georgia Tech for the conference championship. The Commodores tied Michigan 0–0 on October 14 at the dedication of Dudley Field, the South's first permanent college football stadium. On the same day, Big Ten champion Iowa upset Yale.

The 1923 Rose Bowl at season's end was the first called the "Rose Bowl" and was held in the newly constructed stadium. In the first bowl appearance for either team, USC beat Penn State 14–3.

The West Virginia Mountaineers played the Gonzaga Bulldogs in the only other bowl game this season, the San Diego East-West Christmas Classic. WVU won 21–13.

== Rule changes ==
The 1922 season included the new "try for a point" rule. One was allowed to either kick an extra point after a touchdown as usual, or to place the ball anywhere beyond the five yard line and try to score either by touchdown or by a kick, and receive the one point if successful. On the "try for a point," any foul by the defense awarded the offense the point, and any foul by the offense made the try no good

== Conference and program changes ==
=== Conference establishments ===
- Five new conferences began play in 1922:
  - California Coast Conference – active until 1924
  - Midwest Collegiate Athletic Conference – an active NCAA Division III conference
  - North Central Intercollegiate Athletic Conference – an NCAA Division II conference active through the 2007 season; later known as just the North Central Conference
  - South Dakota Intercollegiate Conference – an NAIA conference active through the 1999 season; later known as the South Dakota-Iowa Athletic Conference
  - Southern Conference – an active Division I FCS conference; its 20 members broke away from the Southern Intercollegiate Athletic Association (SIAA) and South Atlantic Intercollegiate Athletic Association (SAIAA) in 1921 and 1922

=== Membership changes ===
| School | 1921 Conference | 1922 Conference |
|---|---|---|
| Alabama Crimson Tide | SIAA | SoCon |
| Auburn Tigers | SIAA | SoCon |
| Brigham Young Cougars | Program Established | Rocky Mountain |
| Clemson Tigers | SIAA | SoCon |
| Florida Gators | SIAA | SoCon |
| Georgia Buldogs | SIAA | SoCon |
| Georgia Tech Yellow Jackets | SIAA | SoCon |
| Idaho Vandals | Independent | Pacific Coast |
| Kentucky Wildcats | SIAA | SoCon |
| LSU Tigers | SIAA | SoCon |
| Maryland Terrapins | SAIAA | SoCon |
| Mississippi Rebels | SIAA | SoCon |
| Mississippi A&M Bulldogs | SIAA | SoCon |
| North Carolina Tar Heels | SAIAA | SoCon |
| NC State Wolfpack | SAIAA | SoCon |
| South Carolina Gamecocks | SIAA | SoCon |
| Southern California Trojans | Independent | Pacific Coast |
| Tennessee Volunteers | SIAA | SoCon |
| Tulane Green Wave | SIAA | SoCon |
| Virginia Cavaliers | SAIAA | SoCon |
| VPI Fighting Gobblers | SAIAA | SoCon |
| Vanderbilt Commodores | SIAA | SIAA/SoCon |
| Washington and Lee Generals | SAIAA | SoCon |

== September ==
September 30 Harvard beat Middlebury 20–0, Princeton beat Johns Hopkins 30–0, and Cornell beat St. Bonaventure 55–6. Vanderbilt opened its season with a 38–0 win over Middle Tennessee Normal (now MTSU). Baylor beat North Texas 55–0 California beat Santa Clara 45–14.

== October ==
October 7 Princeton defeated Virginia 5–0, Harvard beat Holy Cross 20–0, and Cornell beat Niagara 66–0 Vanderbilt beat Henderson-Brown College 33–0 North Carolina lost to Yale at New Haven, 18–0. Iowa beat Knox College 61–0, and Michigan defeated Case 48–0. Chicago beat Georgia 20–0 Drake opened its season with a win over Cornell College of Iowa, 16–0 Baylor beat Hardin-Simmons 42–0 In a meeting with the visiting Mare Island Marines service team, California routed them 80–0.

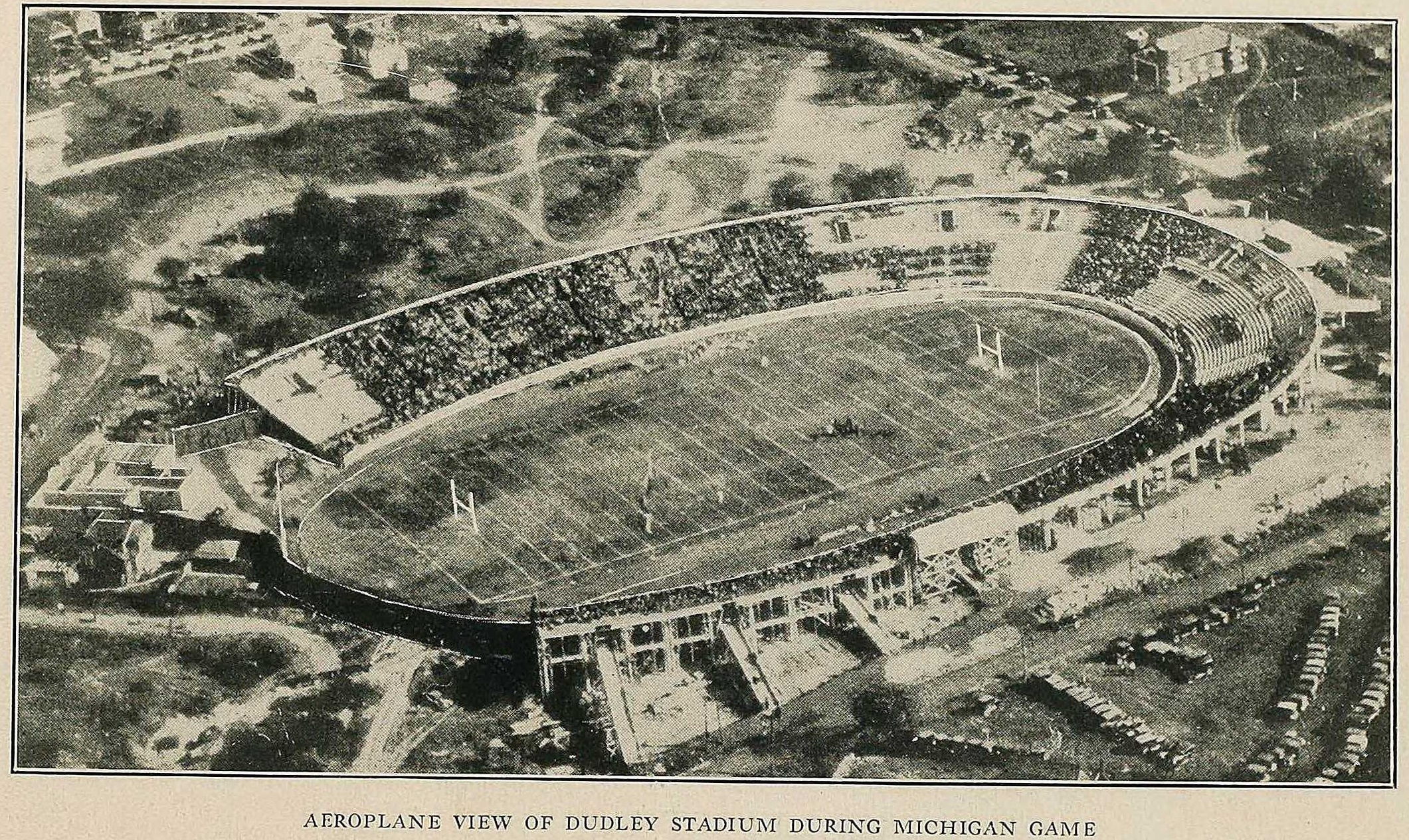
Dudley Field

October 14 Princeton beat Colgate 10–0, Harvard defeated Bowdoin 15–0, and Cornell beat New Hampshire 68–7 At New Haven, Iowa defeated Yale 6–0. In the first game between Eastern and Western teams of the college football season, Iowa dominated Yale. Yale lost to a Western team for the first time ever.

In Nashville, Michigan and Vanderbilt played to a 0–0 tie at the inaugural game for Dudley Field, the first dedicated football-only stadium in the South in the style of the Eastern schools. After beating Duke 20–0 in a Thursday game, North Carolina beat South Carolina, 10–7. Centre gave VPI its only loss of the season. Drake defeated Kansas 6–0. California beat St. Mary's 41–0.

October 21 Harvard had been shocked the year before in a 6–0 upset by the "Prayin' Colonels" of Centre College of Danville, Kentucky. In the rematch, the Crimson beat Centre 24–10. Princeton recorded another shutout, blanking Maryland 26–0. Cornell defeated Colgate 14–0.

In Dallas, Vanderbilt and Texas, both unbeaten, met at the State Fair, with the Commodores winning 20–10. In Houston, Baylor defeated Rice 31–0. North Carolina won at NC State, 14–9. Georgia beat Tennessee 7–3.

Iowa won at Illinois 8–7, and Michigan won at Ohio State 19–0; In St. Louis, Drake beat Washington University, 31–7 Baylor beat Arkansas 60–13 California shut out the Olympic Club team, 25–0.

October 28 In the first football game ever broadcast nationally on the radio Princeton (4–0–0) traveled to the University of Chicago (3–0–0) for a rematch of Chicago's 1921 win. The game was witnessed by 32,000 fans, and listened to on New York's WEAF radio station. John Thomas ran for three touchdowns and Chicago's Maroons led 18–7 as the fourth quarter began, but a 40–yard fumble return closed the gap. In the closing minutes, Princeton back Harry Crum was buried under a pile of players as he plunged toward the goal line, and when the mass was untangled, it was a touchdown. With the help of a superior kicking game, Princeton won 21–18.

Harvard defeated Dartmouth 12–3. Iowa beat Purdue 56–0, and Michigan beat Illinois 24–0 Baylor beat Mississippi College 40–7

Vanderbilt beat Mercer 25–0 North Carolina defeated Maryland 27–3

California was 4–0–0, and USC was 5–0–0, when the teams met in Pasadena. Cal had a 2–0 lead at halftime, and held off USC on two goal line stands, before scoring a touchdown and a field goal to win 12–0.

== November ==
November 4 Princeton beat Swarthmore, 22–13. Cornell (5–0–0) trounced Columbia, which had been 4–1–0, by a score of 56–0. Harvard beat the visiting Florida Gators 24–0. In the Gators' first ever game against a traditional northeastern college football power, the Gators stopped in Washington, D. C. and were greeted by President Warren Harding. The 1922 Spalding's Football Guide ranked Florida as the best forward passing team in the country. The 1922 Florida freshmen won the southern crown for freshmen squads.

The Alabama Crimson Tide had its first intersectional victory, 9–6 over John Heisman's Penn. Alabama coach Xen C. Scott resigned due to cancer at year's end. Vanderbilt won at Tennessee, 14–6. In New Orleans, North Carolina defeated Tulane 19–12.

Michigan beat Michigan State 63–0, having outscored its opponents 154–0 in its first five games. Drake defeated Iowa State 14–7

Baylor beat Texas A&M 13–7. California defeated Washington State, 61–0.

November 11 Princeton and Harvard were both unbeaten(6–0–0) when the Tigers travelled to Cambridge to face the Crimson. Princeton had not won on Harvard's home field since 1896, and 54,000 turned out to watch. Although both teams were unbeaten, Harvard was heavily favored to overcome the young Tiger team, and led 3–0 early in the game. On the 18 yard line, though, the Tigers outsmarted Harvard with a triple pass that set up Harry Crum's touchdown run, and went on to win 10–3. Grantland Rice wrote the next day, "Crimson shadows around Cambridge way were thicker tonight than the Chinese wall and as deep as the darkness of Stygia itself..."

At the Polo Grounds, Cornell beat Dartmouth, with the Big Red overcoming the Big Green, 23–0. In Boston, Baylor lost to Boston College, 33–0.

In Seattle, California (7–0–0) faced Washington (5–0–0) in a battle of unbeatens, and handed the Huskies their first defeat, 45–7.

Iowa beat Minnesota 28–14, and Michigan beat Wisconsin 13–6; Drake beat Colorado State, 19–6 Vanderbilt beat Kentucky 9–0 North Carolina beat VMI 9–7 at Richmond.

November 18 Princeton beat Yale, 3–0, to close a perfect season. Cornell beat Albright, 48–14 Harvard lost its second straight game, falling 3–0 to Brown Iowa won at Ohio State 12–9 to stay unbeaten. Drake defeated Grinnell College. 21–0 Baylor beat Oklahoma State, 10–0 Vanderbilt won at Georgia 12–0. Auburn upset Centre 6–0. The 1922 Tigers are considered one of Auburn's greatest football teams. At Charlotte, NC, North Carolina defeated Davidson 20–6. California defeated Nevada, 61–13.

November 25 Harvard won at Yale, 10–3. California closed its season with a 28–0 win at Stanford. Iowa closed its season at 7–0–0 with a win over Northwestern 37–3, Michigan won at Minnesota 16–7; Drake won at Mississippi State in Starkville, 48–6

November 30 was Thanksgiving Day in 1922. In Philadelphia, Cornell defeated Penn 6–3. In Dallas, Baylor defeated SMU, 24–0, to win the Southwest Conference title. The following week, Baylor lost to the Haskell Indians team, 21–20. North Carolina closed its season with a 10–7 win at Virginia, to finish at 9–1–0. Vanderbilt beat Sewanee, 26–0, to close at 8–0–1.

== Bowl games ==
In the 1923 Rose Bowl, USC defeated Penn State, 14–3. Though USC had an overall record of 9–1 coming into the game, the Trojans finished fourth place in Pacific Coast Conference (PCC) play, behind California, Oregon, and Washington, having been defeated by PCC champion California. Penn State won its first five games, then only one of the next five, and had a 6–4–1 record at season's end.

The 1922 San Diego East-West Christmas Classic was played on December 25 at Balboa Stadium in San Diego, California. The West Virginia Mountaineers defeated the Gonzaga Bulldogs, 21 to 13, to finish the season undefeated with a 10–0—1 record.

== National championship ==
Three different "retro polls", taken years later and based on opinions drawn from historical research, reached different conclusions. The Helms Athletic Foundation, founded in 1936, declared retroactively that Cornell (8–0) was the best, while the College Football Researchers Association (CFRA) recognized Princeton (8–0), and the National Championship Foundation (NCF) cited California (9–0) and Princeton as best. The Princeton team was dubbed the "team of destiny" by Grantland Rice after defeating Chicago in the first game nationally broadcast on radio. Today, college football on radio is common for nearly every game in every division.

The other unbeaten and untied team was Iowa (7–0), which canceled its game with unbeaten Drake that year. Other teams that had no defeats in 1922 were West Virginia (10–0–1), Vanderbilt (8–0–1), Michigan (6–0–1), and Army (8–0–2). Clyde Berryman retroactively selected Vanderbilt, which tied Michigan, as a national champion.

== Conference standings ==
=== Major conference standings ===
1922 Big Ten Conference football standings
| | Conf. | | | | | Overall |
| Team | W | | L | | T | W | | L | | T |
|---|---|---|---|---|---|---|---|---|---|---|
| Iowa + | 5 | – | 0 | – | 0 | 7 | – | 0 | – | 0 |
| Michigan + | 4 | – | 0 | – | 0 | 6 | – | 0 | – | 1 |
| Chicago + | 4 | – | 0 | – | 1 | 5 | – | 1 | – | 1 |
| Wisconsin | 2 | – | 2 | – | 1 | 4 | – | 2 | – | 1 |
| Minnesota | 2 | – | 3 | – | 1 | 3 | – | 3 | – | 1 |
| Illinois | 2 | – | 4 | – | 0 | 2 | – | 5 | – | 0 |
| Northwestern | 1 | – | 3 | – | 1 | 3 | – | 3 | – | 1 |
| Ohio State | 1 | – | 4 | – | 0 | 3 | – | 4 | – | 0 |
| Indiana | 0 | – | 2 | – | 1 | 1 | – | 4 | – | 2 |
| Purdue | 0 | – | 3 | – | 1 | 1 | – | 5 | – | 1 |
+ – Conference co-champions

1922 Missouri Valley Conference football standings
| | Conf. | | | | | Overall |
| Team | W | | L | | T | W | | L | | T |
|---|---|---|---|---|---|---|---|---|---|---|
| Nebraska + | 5 | – | 0 | – | 0 | 7 | – | 1 | – | 0 |
| Drake + | 4 | – | 0 | – | 0 | 7 | – | 0 | – | 0 |
| Kansas State | 3 | – | 1 | – | 2 | 5 | – | 1 | – | 2 |
| Missouri | 4 | – | 3 | – | 0 | 5 | – | 3 | – | 0 |
| Iowa State | 2 | – | 4 | – | 0 | 2 | – | 6 | – | 0 |
| Oklahoma | 1 | – | 2 | – | 2 | 2 | – | 3 | – | 3 |
| Grinnell | 1 | – | 3 | – | 0 | 3 | – | 4 | – | 1 |
| Kansas | 1 | – | 3 | – | 1 | 3 | – | 3 | – | 1 |
| Washington University | 0 | – | 5 | – | 1 | 1 | – | 5 | – | 1 |
+ – Conference co-champions

1922 Northwest Conference football standings
| | Conf. | | | | | Overall |
| Team | W | | L | | T | W | | L | | T |
|---|---|---|---|---|---|---|---|---|---|---|
| Oregon + | 5 | – | 0 | – | 1 | 6 | – | 1 | – | 1 |
| Washington + | 4 | – | 0 | – | 1 | 6 | – | 1 | – | 1 |
| Whitman | 2 | – | 2 | – | 0 | 2 | – | 4 | – | 1 |
| Idaho | 2 | – | 3 | – | 0 | 3 | – | 5 | – | 0 |
| Oregon Agricultural | 1 | – | 2 | – | 0 | 3 | – | 4 | – | 0 |
| Washington State | 1 | – | 3 | – | 0 | 2 | – | 5 | – | 0 |
| Willamette | 0 | – | 2 | – | 0 | 3 | – | 4 | – | 0 |
| Montana | 0 | – | 3 | – | 0 | 3 | – | 4 | – | 0 |
+ – Conference co-champions

1922 Pacific Coast Conference football standings
| | Conf. | | | | | Overall |
| Team | W | | L | | T | W | | L | | T |
|---|---|---|---|---|---|---|---|---|---|---|
| California $ | 4 | – | 0 | – | 0 | 9 | – | 0 | – | 0 |
| Oregon | 3 | – | 0 | – | 1 | 6 | – | 1 | – | 1 |
| Washington | 4 | – | 1 | – | 1 | 6 | – | 1 | – | 1 |
| USC ^ | 3 | – | 1 | – | 0 | 10 | – | 1 | – | 0 |
| Oregon Agricultural | 1 | – | 3 | – | 0 | 3 | – | 4 | – | 0 |
| Stanford | 1 | – | 3 | – | 0 | 4 | – | 5 | – | 0 |
| Washington State | 1 | – | 5 | – | 0 | 2 | – | 5 | – | 0 |
| Idaho | 0 | – | 4 | – | 0 | 3 | – | 5 | – | 0 |
$ – Conference champion; ^ Selected as Rose Bowl representative

1922 Rocky Mountain Conference football standings
| | Conf. | | | | | Overall |
| Team | W | | L | | T | W | | L | | T |
|---|---|---|---|---|---|---|---|---|---|---|
| Utah $ | 5 | – | 0 | – | 0 | 7 | – | 1 | – | 0 |
| Colorado Agricultural | 5 | – | 1 | – | 1 | 5 | – | 2 | – | 1 |
| Denver | 3 | – | 1 | – | 1 | 6 | – | 1 | – | 1 |
| Colorado Mines | 3 | – | 2 | – | 1 | 4 | – | 2 | – | 1 |
| Utah Agricultural | 3 | – | 3 | – | 0 | 5 | – | 4 | – | 0 |
| Colorado College | 2 | – | 2 | – | 1 | 3 | – | 3 | – | 1 |
| Colorado | 2 | – | 3 | – | 0 | 4 | – | 4 | – | 0 |
| BYU | 1 | – | 5 | – | 0 | 1 | – | 5 | – | 0 |
| Wyoming | 1 | – | 7 | – | 0 | 1 | – | 8 | – | 0 |
| Montana State | 0 | – | 1 | – | 0 | 4 | – | 4 | – | 0 |
$ – Conference champion

1922 Southern Conference football standings
| | Conf. | | | | | Overall |
| Team | W | | L | | T | W | | L | | T |
|---|---|---|---|---|---|---|---|---|---|---|
| North Carolina + | 5 | – | 0 | – | 0 | 9 | – | 1 | – | 0 |
| Georgia Tech + | 4 | – | 0 | – | 0 | 7 | – | 2 | – | 0 |
| Vanderbilt * + | 3 | – | 0 | – | 0 | 8 | – | 0 | – | 1 |
| VPI | 3 | – | 0 | – | 0 | 8 | – | 1 | – | 1 |
| Florida | 2 | – | 0 | – | 0 | 7 | – | 2 | – | 0 |
| Auburn | 2 | – | 1 | – | 0 | 8 | – | 2 | – | 0 |
| Tennessee | 3 | – | 2 | – | 0 | 8 | – | 2 | – | 0 |
| Alabama | 3 | – | 2 | – | 1 | 6 | – | 3 | – | 1 |
| Virginia | 1 | – | 1 | – | 1 | 4 | – | 4 | – | 1 |
| Mississippi A&M | 2 | – | 3 | – | 0 | 3 | – | 4 | – | 2 |
| Kentucky | 1 | – | 2 | – | 0 | 6 | – | 3 | – | 0 |
| Clemson | 1 | – | 2 | – | 0 | 5 | – | 4 | – | 0 |
| Washington and Lee | 1 | – | 2 | – | 0 | 5 | – | 3 | – | 1 |
| Maryland | 1 | – | 2 | – | 0 | 4 | – | 5 | – | 1 |
| LSU | 1 | – | 2 | – | 0 | 3 | – | 7 | – | 0 |
| Georgia | 1 | – | 3 | – | 1 | 5 | – | 4 | – | 1 |
| Tulane | 1 | – | 4 | – | 0 | 4 | – | 4 | – | 0 |
| South Carolina | 0 | – | 2 | – | 0 | 5 | – | 4 | – | 0 |
| Ole Miss | 0 | – | 2 | – | 0 | 4 | – | 5 | – | 1 |
| NC State | 0 | – | 5 | – | 0 | 4 | – | 6 | – | 0 |
+ – Conference co-champions; * – co-member of SIAA

1922 Southwest Conference football standings
| | Conf. | | | | | Overall |
| Team | W | | L | | T | W | | L | | T |
|---|---|---|---|---|---|---|---|---|---|---|
| Baylor $ | 5 | – | 0 | – | 0 | 8 | – | 3 | – | 0 |
| Texas | 2 | – | 1 | – | 0 | 7 | – | 2 | – | 0 |
| SMU | 2 | – | 2 | – | 0 | 6 | – | 3 | – | 1 |
| Texas A&M | 2 | – | 2 | – | 0 | 5 | – | 4 | – | 1 |
| Oklahoma A&M | 2 | – | 3 | – | 0 | 4 | – | 4 | – | 1 |
| Arkansas | 1 | – | 3 | – | 0 | 4 | – | 5 | – | 0 |
| Rice | 1 | – | 4 | – | 0 | 4 | – | 4 | – | 0 |
$ – Conference champion

=== Independents ===
1922 Eastern college football independents records
| | Conf. | | | Overall |
| Team | W | L | T | W | | L | | T |
|---|---|---|---|---|---|---|---|---|
| Cornell | | – | | 8 | – | 0 | – | 0 |
| Princeton | | – | | 8 | – | 0 | – | 0 |
| Army | | – | | 8 | – | 0 | – | 2 |
| Syracuse | | – | | 6 | – | 1 | – | 2 |
| Franklin & Marshall | | – | | 8 | – | 2 | – | 0 |
| Pittsburgh | | – | | 8 | – | 2 | – | 0 |
| Holy Cross | | – | | 7 | – | 2 | – | 1 |
| Harvard | | – | | 7 | – | 2 | – | 0 |
| Lafayette | | – | | 7 | – | 2 | – | 0 |
| Springfield | | – | | 6 | – | 2 | – | 0 |
| Boston College | | – | | 6 | – | 2 | – | 1 |
| Brown | | – | | 6 | – | 2 | – | 1 |
| Colgate | | – | | 6 | – | 3 | – | 0 |
| Dartmouth | | – | | 6 | – | 3 | – | 0 |
| Penn | | – | | 6 | – | 3 | – | 0 |
| Vermont | | – | | 6 | – | 3 | – | 0 |
| Washington & Jefferson | | – | | 6 | – | 3 | – | 1 |
| Yale | | – | | 6 | – | 3 | – | 1 |
| Bucknell | | – | | 7 | – | 4 | – | 0 |
| Penn State | | – | | 6 | – | 4 | – | 1 |
| Carnegie Tech | | – | | 5 | – | 3 | – | 1 |
| Villanova | | – | | 5 | – | 3 | – | 1 |
| Columbia | | – | | 5 | – | 4 | – | 0 |
| Rutgers | | – | | 5 | – | 4 | – | 0 |
| Tufts | | – | | 5 | – | 4 | – | 0 |
| Rhode Island State | | – | | 4 | – | 4 | – | 0 |
| NYU | | – | | 4 | – | 5 | – | 0 |
| Fordham | | – | | 3 | – | 5 | – | 2 |
| Geneva | | – | | 4 | – | 6 | – | 0 |
| Boston University | | – | | 2 | – | 4 | – | 3 |
| Lehigh | | – | | 3 | – | 5 | – | 1 |
| New Hampshire | | – | | 3 | – | 5 | – | 1 |
| Drexel | | – | | 2 | – | 4 | – | 0 |
| Temple | | – | | 1 | – | 4 | – | 1 |
| Buffalo | | – | | 1 | – | 5 | – | 0 |
| CCNY | | – | | 1 | – | 6 | – | 0 |
| Duquesne | | – | | 0 | – | 8 | – | 0 |

1922 Midwestern college football independents records
| | Conf. | | | Overall |
| Team | W | L | T | W | | L | | T |
|---|---|---|---|---|---|---|---|---|
| Western State Normal | | – | | 6 | – | 0 | – | 0 |
| Bradley | | – | | 9 | – | 0 | – | 1 |
| Marquette | | – | | 8 | – | 0 | – | 1 |
| Central Michigan | | – | | 6 | – | 0 | – | 2 |
| Notre Dame | | – | | 8 | – | 1 | – | 1 |
| Butler | | – | | 8 | – | 2 | – | 0 |
| Haskell | | – | | 8 | – | 2 | – | 0 |
| Detroit | | – | | 7 | – | 2 | – | 1 |
| Michigan Mines | | – | | 1 | – | 0 | – | 1 |
| Wabash | | – | | 7 | – | 3 | – | 0 |
| St. Ignatius (OH) | | – | | 4 | – | 1 | – | 3 |
| Dayton | | – | | 6 | – | 3 | – | 0 |
| Saint Louis | | – | | 6 | – | 3 | – | 1 |
| Valparaiso | | – | | 3 | – | 2 | – | 2 |
| Baldwin–Wallace | | – | | 4 | – | 3 | – | 1 |
| DePauw | | – | | 4 | – | 3 | – | 2 |
| Michigan Agricultural | | – | | 3 | – | 5 | – | 2 |
| Earlham | | – | | 2 | – | 6 | – | 0 |
| Kent State | | – | | 0 | – | 7 | – | 0 |

1922 Southern college football independents records
| | Conf. | | | Overall |
| Team | W | L | T | W | | L | | T |
|---|---|---|---|---|---|---|---|---|
| West Virginia | | – | | 10 | – | 0 | – | 1 |
| Tennessee Docs | | – | | 7 | – | 0 | – | 1 |
| Western Kentucky State Normal | | – | | 9 | – | 1 | – | 0 |
| Trinity (NC) | | – | | 7 | – | 2 | – | 1 |
| VMI | | – | | 7 | – | 2 | – | 0 |
| Richmond | | – | | 6 | – | 2 | – | 1 |
| West Tennessee State Normal | | – | | 5 | – | 2 | – | 3 |
| Navy | | – | | 5 | – | 2 | – | 0 |
| Delaware | | – | | 6 | – | 3 | – | 0 |
| Stetson | | – | | 4 | – | 2 | – | 0 |
| William & Mary | | – | | 6 | – | 3 | – | 0 |
| Georgetown | | – | | 6 | – | 3 | – | 1 |
| Marion | | – | | 5 | – | 4 | – | 1 |
| East Tennessee | | – | | 5 | – | 4 | – | 0 |
| Marshall | | – | | 5 | – | 4 | – | 0 |
| Roanoke | | – | | 5 | – | 4 | – | 0 |
| Texas Mines | | – | | 5 | – | 4 | – | 0 |
| Loyola (LA) | | – | | 4 | – | 3 | – | 1 |
| Spring Hill | | – | | 4 | – | 4 | – | 0 |
| Sam Houston Normal | | – | | 3 | – | 4 | – | 0 |
| Wake Forest | | – | | 3 | – | 5 | – | 2 |
| Davidson | | – | | 2 | – | 6 | – | 2 |
| Catholic University | | – | | 2 | – | 6 | – | 0 |
| George Washington | | – | | 2 | – | 6 | – | 0 |
| Middle Tennessee State Normal | | – | | 2 | – | 6 | – | 0 |
| Mississippi Normal | | – | | 2 | – | 6 | – | 0 |
| Louisville | | – | | 2 | – | 7 | – | 0 |
| Birmingham–Southern | | – | | 1 | – | 6 | – | 1 |
| Erskine | | – | | 0 | – | 8 | – | 0 |

1922 Western college football independents records
| | Conf. | | | Overall |
| Team | W | L | T | W | | L | | T |
|---|---|---|---|---|---|---|---|---|
| La Verne | | – | | 6 | – | 2 | – | 2 |
| New Mexico A&M | | – | | 6 | – | 2 | – | 0 |
| Arizona | | – | | 6 | – | 3 | – | 0 |
| Hawaii | | – | | 5 | – | 1 | – | 1 |
| Gonzaga | | – | | 5 | – | 3 | – | 0 |
| Nevada | | – | | 5 | – | 3 | – | 1 |
| Santa Clara | | – | | 4 | – | 4 | – | 1 |
| Cal Aggies | | – | | 3 | – | 4 | – | 2 |
| New Mexico | | – | | 3 | – | 4 | – | 0 |
| Saint Mary's | | – | | 3 | – | 6 | – | 0 |
| Tempe Normal | | – | | 0 | – | 3 | – | 1 |

=== Minor conferences ===
| Conference | Champion(s) | Record |
|---|---|---|
| California Coast Conference | Fresno State Normal | 2–0–1 |
| Central Intercollegiate Athletics Association | Hampton Institute | 4–1 |
| Inter-Normal Athletic Conference of Wisconsin | Eau Claire Normal; Whitewater Normal | 2–0–1 |
| Kansas Collegiate Athletic Conference | Baker (KS) | — |
| Louisiana Intercollegiate Athletic Association | Centenary (LA) | 3–0 |
| Michigan Intercollegiate Athletic Association | Albion | 4–0–1 |
| Midwest Collegiate Athletic Conference | Coe; Millikin; Lawrence | 2–0; 1–0; 2–0–1 |
| Minnesota Intercollegiate Athletic Conference | St. Olaf; St. Thomas | — |
| Nebraska Intercollegiate Conference | Unknown | — |
| North Central Intercollegiate Conference | South Dakota State College | 4–1–1 |
| Ohio Athletic Conference | Ohio Wesleyan | 7–0 |
| Oklahoma Intercollegiate Conference | Tulsa | 4–0 |
| South Dakota Intercollegiate Conference | Dakota Wesleyan | — |
| Southern California Intercollegiate Athletic Conference | Pomona | 5–0 |
| Southern Intercollegiate Athletic Conference | Morehouse | — |
| Southwestern Athletic Conference | Paul Quinn | — |

=== Minor conference standings ===
1922 California Coast Conference football standings
| | Conf. | | | | | Overall |
| Team | W | | L | | T | W | | L | | T |
|---|---|---|---|---|---|---|---|---|---|---|
| Fresno State $ | 2 | – | 0 | – | 1 | 7 | – | 1 | – | 2 |
| Pacific (CA) | 3 | – | 0 | – | 0 | 6 | – | 1 | – | 0 |
| Chico State | 2 | – | 1 | – | 0 | 5 | – | 3 | – | 0 |
| Modesto | 2 | – | 2 | – | 1 | 2 | – | 3 | – | 4 |
| Loyola (CA) | 1 | – | 1 | – | 0 | 3 | – | 4 | – | 1 |
| Sacramento | 0 | – | 1 | – | 0 | ? | – | ? | – | ? |
| Cal Poly | 0 | – | 2 | – | 0 | 1 | – | 3 | – | 0 |
| San Jose State | 0 | – | 3 | – | 0 | 2 | – | 5 | – | 1 |
$ – Conference champion

1922 Colored Intercollegiate Athletic Association football standings
| | Conf. | | | | | Overall |
| Team | W | | L | | T | W | | L | | T |
|---|---|---|---|---|---|---|---|---|---|---|
| Hampton $ | 4 | – | 1 | – | 0 | 6 | – | 1 | – | 0 |
| Virginia Union | 3 | – | 1 | – | 0 | 4 | – | 2 | – | 1 |
| Shaw | 1 | – | 1 | – | 0 | 5 | – | 2 | – | 1 |
| Howard | 2 | – | 2 | – | 0 | 4 | – | 2 | – | 0 |
| Virginia Normal | 2 | – | 3 | – | 0 | 4 | – | 4 | – | 0 |
| Lincoln (PA) | 1 | – | 2 | – | 0 | 6 | – | 3 | – | 0 |
| Virginia Seminary | 0 | – | 3 | – | 0 | 1 | – | 5 | – | 0 |
$ – Conference champion

1922 Illinois Intercollegiate Athletic Conference football standings
| | Conf. | | | | | Overall |
| Team | W | | L | | T | W | | L | | T |
|---|---|---|---|---|---|---|---|---|---|---|
| Lombard + | 3 | – | 0 | – | 0 | 7 | – | 0 | – | 2 |
| Eastern Illinois | 3 | – | 0 | – | 2 | 4 | – | 0 | – | 2 |
| Shurtleff | 4 | – | 1 | – | 1 | 4 | – | 1 | – | 1 |
| Illinois Wesleyan | 6 | – | 2 | – | 0 | 6 | – | 3 | – | 0 |
| Northern Illinois State | 3 | – | 1 | – | 1 | 5 | – | 4 | – | 1 |
| Western Illinois | 2 | – | 1 | – | 0 | 5 | – | 3 | – | 0 |
| Eureka | 4 | – | 3 | – | 0 | 5 | – | 3 | – | 0 |
| Carthage | 2 | – | 2 | – | 0 | 5 | – | 4 | – | 0 |
| Lake Forest | 0 | – | 0 | – | 1 | 4 | – | 3 | – | 2 |
| McKendree | 1 | – | 1 | – | 1 | 1 | – | 1 | – | 2 |
| Mount Morris | 1 | – | 1 | – | 0 | 3 | – | 3 | – | 0 |
| Millikin | 2 | – | 2 | – | 1 | 3 | – | 4 | – | 2 |
| Monmouth (IL) | 2 | – | 4 | – | 0 | 2 | – | 6 | – | 0 |
| Knox (IL) | 1 | – | 3 | – | 0 | 2 | – | 7 | – | 0 |
| Illinois State Normal | 1 | – | 3 | – | 3 | 1 | – | 4 | – | 3 |
| Lincoln (IL) | 1 | – | 3 | – | 0 | 1 | – | 5 | – | 0 |
| Augustana (IL) | 1 | – | 5 | – | 0 | 1 | – | 8 | – | 0 |
| St. Viator | 0 | – | 1 | – | 0 | 3 | – | 4 | – | 1 |
| Wheaton (IL) | 0 | – | 3 | – | 0 | 2 | – | 5 | – | 0 |
| Southern Illinois | 0 | – | 3 | – | 0 | 1 | – | 6 | – | 0 |
| Illinois College | ? | – | ? | – | ? | 5 | – | 4 | – | 0 |
| Blackburn | ? | – | ? | – | ? | 1 | – | 4 | – | 1 |
$ – Conference champion

1922 Kansas Collegiate Athletic Conference football standings
| | Conf. | | | | | Overall |
| Team | W | | L | | T | W | | L | | T |
|---|---|---|---|---|---|---|---|---|---|---|
| Baker $ | 7 | – | 1 | – | 0 | 8 | – | 1 | – | 0 |
| Kansas State Normal | 6 | – | 1 | – | 0 | 6 | – | 2 | – | 0 |
| College of Emporia | 5 | – | 1 | – | 2 | 6 | – | 1 | – | 2 |
| Friends | 5 | – | 2 | – | 0 | 5 | – | 2 | – | 0 |
| Southwestern (KS) | 5 | – | 2 | – | 2 | 5 | – | 3 | – | 2 |
| Bethany (KS) | 5 | – | 3 | – | 0 | 5 | – | 3 | – | 0 |
| McPherson | 5 | – | 4 | – | 0 | 5 | – | 4 | – | 0 |
| Sterling | 4 | – | 4 | – | 0 | 4 | – | 4 | – | 0 |
| St. Mary's (KS) | 3 | – | 3 | – | 0 | 4 | – | 4 | – | 0 |
| Pittsburg Teachers | 3 | – | 4 | – | 0 | 4 | – | 5 | – | 0 |
| Fairmount | 3 | – | 5 | – | 1 | 3 | – | 6 | – | 1 |
| Hays Teachers | 2 | – | 4 | – | 1 | 2 | – | 4 | – | 1 |
| Kansas Wesleyan | 2 | – | 7 | – | 0 | 2 | – | 7 | – | 0 |
| Washburn | 1 | – | 5 | – | 0 | 1 | – | 7 | – | 0 |
| Bethel (KS) | 0 | – | 3 | – | 0 | 0 | – | 3 | – | 0 |
| Ottawa | 0 | – | 7 | – | 0 | 0 | – | 8 | – | 0 |
$ – Conference champion

1922 Midwest Conference football standings
| | Conf. | | | | | Overall |
| Team | W | | L | | T | W | | L | | T |
|---|---|---|---|---|---|---|---|---|---|---|
| Coe + | 2 | – | 0 | – | 0 | 7 | – | 0 | – | 0 |
| Lawrence + | 2 | – | 0 | – | 1 | 6 | – | 0 | – | 1 |
| Millikin + | 1 | – | 0 | – | 0 | 3 | – | 4 | – | 2 |
| Hamline | 2 | – | 1 | – | 0 | 4 | – | 2 | – | 1 |
| Carleton | 1 | – | 1 | – | 0 | 4 | – | 3 | – | 0 |
| Knox | 1 | – | 3 | – | 0 | 2 | – | 7 | – | 0 |
| Beloit | 0 | – | 1 | – | 1 | 3 | – | 3 | – | 1 |
| Cornell (IA) | 0 | – | 3 | – | 0 | 3 | – | 5 | – | 0 |
+ – Conference co-champions

1922 Minnesota Intercollegiate Athletic Conference football standings
| | Conf. | | | | | Overall |
| Team | W | | L | | T | W | | L | | T |
|---|---|---|---|---|---|---|---|---|---|---|
| St. Olaf + | 4 | – | 0 | – | 1 | 5 | – | 0 | – | 1 |
| St. Thomas (MN) + | 4 | – | 0 | – | 0 | 8 | – | 1 | – | 0 |
| Hamline | 3 | – | 1 | – | 0 | 4 | – | 2 | – | 1 |
| Carleton | 2 | – | 2 | – | 0 | 6 | – | 1 | – | 0 |
| Macalester | 2 | – | 3 | – | 1 | 2 | – | 3 | – | 1 |
| Concordia (MN) | 0 | – | 1 | – | 0 | 1 | – | 4 | – | 0 |
| Saint John's (MN) | 0 | – | 4 | – | 0 | 1 | – | 5 | – | 0 |
| Gustavus Adolphus | 0 | – | 4 | – | 0 | 0 | – | 4 | – | 1 |
+ – Conference co-champions

1922 Missouri Intercollegiate Athletic Association football standings
| | Conf. | | | | | Overall |
| Team | W | | L | | T | W | | L | | T |
|---|---|---|---|---|---|---|---|---|---|---|
| Springfield (MO) $ | 7 | – | 0 | – | 0 | 7 | – | 0 | – | 0 |
| Kirksville | 6 | – | 0 | – | 2 | 6 | – | 0 | – | 2 |
| William Jewell | 5 | – | 0 | – | 2 | 5 | – | 1 | – | 2 |
| Central (MO) | 3 | – | 2 | – | 1 | 4 | – | 4 | – | 1 |
| Cape Girardeau | 1 | – | 1 | – | 0 | 5 | – | 2 | – | 1 |
| Missouri Valley | 2 | – | 2 | – | 0 | 4 | – | 2 | – | 0 |
| Missouri Wesleyan | 4 | – | 4 | – | 0 | 6 | – | 4 | – | 0 |
| Maryville (MO) | 3 | – | 3 | – | 1 | 4 | – | 4 | – | 1 |
| Drury | 2 | – | 3 | – | 1 | 2 | – | 4 | – | 1 |
| Missouri Mines | 1 | – | 2 | – | 0 | 1 | – | 6 | – | 1 |
| Warrensburg | 2 | – | 6 | – | 0 | 3 | – | 6 | – | 0 |
| Tarkio | 1 | – | 4 | – | 0 | 4 | – | 4 | – | 0 |
| Culver–Stockton | 0 | – | 2 | – | 2 | 1 | – | 4 | – | 2 |
| Westminster (MO) | 0 | – | 4 | – | 2 | 0 | – | 5 | – | 2 |
| Central Wesleyan | 0 | – | 4 | – | 1 | 1 | – | 6 | – | 1 |
$ – Conference champion

1922 Nebraska Intercollegiate Conference football standings
| | Conf. | | | | | Overall |
| Team | W | | L | | T | W | | L | | T |
|---|---|---|---|---|---|---|---|---|---|---|
| Midland $ | 7 | – | 0 | – | 1 | 7 | – | 1 | – | 1 |
| Peru Normal | 5 | – | 1 | – | 0 | 6 | – | 1 | – | 0 |
| Nebraska Wesleyan | 4 | – | 1 | – | 0 | 4 | – | 4 | – | 1 |
| Chadron Normal | 2 | – | 1 | – | 0 | 4 | – | 2 | – | 1 |
| Kearney Normal | 5 | – | 2 | – | 1 | 5 | – | 2 | – | 1 |
| Grand Island | 4 | – | 2 | – | 1 | ? | – | ? | – | ? |
| Hastings | 4 | – | 2 | – | 1 | ? | – | ? | – | ? |
| Doane | 3 | – | 3 | – | 1 | 4 | – | 3 | – | 1 |
| Cotner | 2 | – | 4 | – | 1 | 0 | – | 8 | – | 0 |
| Nebraska Central | 2 | – | 5 | – | 0 | ? | – | ? | – | ? |
| Wayne Normal | 1 | – | 4 | – | 0 | 1 | – | 6 | – | 0 |
| York (NE) | 0 | – | 6 | – | 0 | 0 | – | 6 | – | 0 |
$ – Conference champion

1922 North Central Conference football standings
| | Conf. | | | | | Overall |
| Team | W | | L | | T | W | | L | | T |
|---|---|---|---|---|---|---|---|---|---|---|
| South Dakota State $ | 4 | – | 1 | – | 1 | 5 | – | 4 | – | 1 |
| Creighton | 3 | – | 1 | – | 0 | 7 | – | 2 | – | 1 |
| North Dakota | 3 | – | 1 | – | 0 | 3 | – | 3 | – | 0 |
| St. Thomas (MN) | 1 | – | 1 | – | 0 | 8 | – | 1 | – | 0 |
| North Dakota Agricultural | 1 | – | 2 | – | 0 | 6 | – | 2 | – | 0 |
| Des Moines | 0 | – | 1 | – | 1 | 4 | – | 2 | – | 1 |
| Morningside | 0 | – | 2 | – | 2 | 1 | – | 4 | – | 2 |
| South Dakota | 0 | – | 2 | – | 1 | 3 | – | 6 | – | 1 |
| Nebraska Wesleyan | 0 | – | 2 | – | 1 | 4 | – | 4 | – | 1 |
$ – Conference champion

1922 Ohio Athletic Conference football standings
| | Conf. | | | | | Overall |
| Team | W | | L | | T | W | | L | | T |
|---|---|---|---|---|---|---|---|---|---|---|
| Ohio Wesleyan $ | 7 | – | 0 | – | 0 | 8 | – | 1 | – | 0 |
| Oberlin | 5 | – | 0 | – | 0 | 6 | – | 1 | – | 0 |
| St. Xavier | 2 | – | 0 | – | 0 | 7 | – | 2 | – | 0 |
| Wooster | 7 | – | 1 | – | 0 | 8 | – | 1 | – | 0 |
| Ohio | 3 | – | 1 | – | 0 | 5 | – | 3 | – | 0 |
| Mount Union | 5 | – | 2 | – | 0 | 6 | – | 2 | – | 1 |
| Wittenberg | 5 | – | 2 | – | 1 | 6 | – | 2 | – | 1 |
| Akron | 5 | – | 3 | – | 0 | 5 | – | 3 | – | 0 |
| Denison | 4 | – | 3 | – | 0 | 6 | – | 3 | – | 0 |
| Miami (OH) | 4 | – | 3 | – | 0 | 4 | – | 3 | – | 1 |
| Kenyon | 2 | – | 4 | – | 0 | 3 | – | 5 | – | 0 |
| Western Reserve | 3 | – | 6 | – | 0 | 3 | – | 7 | – | 0 |
| Cincinnati | 1 | – | 3 | – | 1 | 1 | – | 7 | – | 1 |
| Ohio Northern | 2 | – | 5 | – | 0 | 4 | – | 5 | – | 0 |
| Otterbein | 2 | – | 6 | – | 0 | 2 | – | 6 | – | 0 |
| Case | 2 | – | 7 | – | 0 | 2 | – | 8 | – | 0 |
| Muskingum | 1 | – | 4 | – | 0 | 4 | – | 5 | – | 0 |
| Hiram | 1 | – | 6 | – | 0 | 2 | – | 7 | – | 0 |
| Heidelberg | 1 | – | 6 | – | 0 | 1 | – | 7 | – | 0 |
$ – Conference champion

1922 Oklahoma Intercollegiate Conference football standings
| | Conf. | | | | | Overall |
| Team | W | | L | | T | W | | L | | T |
|---|---|---|---|---|---|---|---|---|---|---|
| Phillips + | 5 | – | 0 | – | 0 | 7 | – | 1 | – | 0 |
| Tulsa + | 4 | – | 0 | – | 0 | 8 | – | 0 | – | 0 |
| Southeastern Oklahoma State + | 3 | – | 1 | – | 0 | 7 | – | 1 | – | 1 |
| Oklahoma A&M | 2 | – | 0 | – | 0 | 4 | – | 4 | – | 1 |
| Central State Teachers | 5 | – | 3 | – | 0 | 7 | – | 4 | – | 0 |
| Southwestern State | 4 | – | 3 | – | 0 | 5 | – | 4 | – | 0 |
| East Central | 2 | – | 3 | – | 0 | 5 | – | 3 | – | 1 |
| Northwestern Oklahoma State | 1 | – | 4 | – | 1 | 3 | – | 4 | – | 1 |
| Oklahoma Baptist | 1 | – | 6 | – | 1 | 2 | – | 7 | – | 1 |
| Oklahoma City | 0 | – | 7 | – | 0 | 0 | – | 9 | – | 0 |
$ – Conference champion

1922 South Dakota Intercollegiate Conference football standings
| | Conf. | | | | | Overall |
| Team | W | | L | | T | W | | L | | T |
|---|---|---|---|---|---|---|---|---|---|---|
| Dakota Wesleyan $ | 4 | – | 0 | – | 0 | 5 | – | 2 | – | 0 |
| Spearfish | 3 | – | 0 | – | 1 | 3 | – | 2 | – | 1 |
| Yankton | 4 | – | 1 | – | 0 | 6 | – | 2 | – | 0 |
| South Dakota Mines | 3 | – | 1 | – | 1 | 5 | – | 2 | – | 1 |
| Columbus (SD) | 1 | – | 1 | – | 0 | 2 | – | 5 | – | 0 |
| Augustana (SD) | 1 | – | 2 | – | 0 | 3 | – | 4 | – | 0 |
| Northern Normal | 1 | – | 3 | – | 0 | 3 | – | 3 | – | 0 |
| Huron | 0 | – | 4 | – | 0 | 0 | – | 5 | – | 0 |
| Sioux Falls | 0 | – | 5 | – | 0 | 0 | – | 6 | – | 0 |
$ – Conference champion

1922 Southern California Conference football standings
| | Conf. | | | | | Overall |
| Team | W | | L | | T | W | | L | | T |
|---|---|---|---|---|---|---|---|---|---|---|
| Pomona $ | 5 | – | 0 | – | 0 | 5 | – | 3 | – | 0 |
| Occidental | 4 | – | 1 | – | 0 | 5 | – | 3 | – | 0 |
| Caltech | 3 | – | 2 | – | 0 | 3 | – | 3 | – | 0 |
| Whittier | 1 | – | 3 | – | 1 | 3 | – | 3 | – | 1 |
| Southern Branch | 1 | – | 3 | – | 1 | 2 | – | 3 | – | 1 |
| Redlands | 0 | – | 5 | – | 0 | 2 | – | 5 | – | 0 |
$ – Conference champion

1922 Southern Intercollegiate Athletic Association football standings
| | Conf. | | | | | Overall |
| Team | W | | L | | T | W | | L | | T |
|---|---|---|---|---|---|---|---|---|---|---|
| Furman $ | 3 | – | 0 | – | 0 | 8 | – | 3 | – | 0 |
| Vanderbilt* | 2 | – | 0 | – | 0 | 8 | – | 0 | – | 1 |
| Presbyterian | 2 | – | 0 | – | 0 | 6 | – | 2 | – | 1 |
| Mississippi College | 2 | – | 0 | – | 0 | 6 | – | 3 | – | 0 |
| Centre | 1 | – | 0 | – | 0 | 8 | – | 2 | – | 0 |
| Georgetown (KY) | 1 | – | 0 | – | 0 | 1 | – | 1 | – | 0 |
| Chattanooga | 3 | – | 1 | – | 0 | 6 | – | 2 | – | 1 |
| Western Kentucky | 1 | – | 1 | – | 0 | 9 | – | 1 | – | 0 |
| Sewanee | 1 | – | 1 | – | 0 | 3 | – | 4 | – | 1 |
| Millsaps | 1 | – | 1 | – | 0 | 1 | – | 1 | – | 0 |
| Mercer | 1 | – | 2 | – | 0 | 4 | – | 6 | – | 0 |
| Transylvania | 0 | – | 1 | – | 0 | 0 | – | 1 | – | 0 |
| The Citadel | 0 | – | 2 | – | 0 | 3 | – | 5 | – | 0 |
| Howard (AL) | 0 | – | 2 | – | 0 | 2 | – | 6 | – | 2 |
| Louisville | 0 | – | 2 | – | 0 | 2 | – | 7 | – | 0 |
| Wofford | 0 | – | 2 | – | 0 | 2 | – | 7 | – | 0 |
| Oglethorpe | 0 | – | 4 | – | 0 | 1 | – | 9 | – | 0 |
$ – Conference champion; * – co-member of SoCon

1922 Spokane Intercollegiate Conference football standings
| | Conf. | | | | | Overall |
| Team | W | | L | | T | W | | L | | T |
|---|---|---|---|---|---|---|---|---|---|---|
| Whitworth $ | 5 | – | 0 | – | 0 | ? | – | ? | – | ? |
| Spokane College | 3 | – | 2 | – | 0 | ? | – | ? | – | ? |
| Cheney Normal | 1 | – | 2 | – | 0 | 1 | – | 5 | – | 0 |
| Spokane University | 0 | – | 5 | – | 0 | ? | – | ? | – | ? |
$ – Conference champion

1922 Texas Intercollegiate Athletic Association football standings
| | Conf. | | | | | Overall |
| Team | W | | L | | T | W | | L | | T |
|---|---|---|---|---|---|---|---|---|---|---|
| Austin $ | 5 | – | 1 | – | 0 | 6 | – | 2 | – | 0 |
| North Texas State Normal | 3 | – | 0 | – | 0 | 5 | – | 2 | – | 1 |
| Rice | 1 | – | 0 | – | 0 | 4 | – | 4 | – | 0 |
| Simmons (TX) | 4 | – | 1 | – | 1 | 5 | – | 3 | – | 1 |
| Howard Payne | 4 | – | 2 | – | 1 | 6 | – | 2 | – | 1 |
| Trinity (TX) | 2 | – | 2 | – | 2 | 3 | – | 2 | – | 3 |
| Southwestern (TX) | 2 | – | 3 | – | 0 | 4 | – | 6 | – | 0 |
| Daniel Baker | 2 | – | 4 | – | 0 | 2 | – | 6 | – | 0 |
| East Texas State | 0 | – | 2 | – | 0 | 4 | – | 5 | – | 0 |
| West Texas State | 0 | – | 2 | – | 0 | 2 | – | 8 | – | 0 |
| Southwest Texas State | 0 | – | 3 | – | 0 | 3 | – | 3 | – | 0 |
| TCU | 0 | – | 3 | – | 2 | 2 | – | 5 | – | 3 |
$ – Conference champion

1922 Wisconsin Normal Athletic Conference football standings
| | Conf. | | | | | Overall |
| Team | W | | L | | T | W | | L | | T |
|---|---|---|---|---|---|---|---|---|---|---|
| Eau Claire Normal + | 2 | – | 0 | – | 1 | 5 | – | 0 | – | 1 |
| Whitewater Normal + | 2 | – | 0 | – | 1 | 5 | – | 0 | – | 2 |
| Oshkosh Normal | 3 | – | 1 | – | 3 | 4 | – | 1 | – | 3 |
| Milwaukee Normal | 2 | – | 2 | – | 0 | 4 | – | 2 | – | 1 |
| La Crosse Normal | 1 | – | 1 | – | 1 | 3 | – | 2 | – | 1 |
| River Falls Normal | 2 | – | 2 | – | 1 | 3 | – | 3 | – | 1 |
| Superior Normal | 2 | – | 2 | – | 0 | 4 | – | 4 | – | 2 |
| Platteville Normal | 1 | – | 2 | – | 0 | 3 | – | 4 | – | 0 |
| Stevens Point Normal | 1 | – | 3 | – | 1 | 3 | – | 4 | – | 1 |
| Stout Normal | 0 | – | 3 | – | 0 | 1 | – | 3 | – | 0 |
$ – Conference champion

== Awards and honors ==
=== All-Americans ===
The consensus All-America team included:

| Position | Name | Height | Weight (lbs.) | Class | Hometown | Team |
|---|---|---|---|---|---|---|
| QB | Gordon Locke | 5'10" | 165 | Jr. | Denison, Iowa | Iowa |
| HB | Harry Kipke | 5'11" | 155 | Jr. | Lansing, Michigan | Michigan |
| HB | Eddie Kaw | 5'10" | 168 | Sr. | Houston, Texas | Cornell |
| FB | John Webster Thomas | | | Jr. | Ocheyedan, Iowa | Chicago |
| E | Harold Muller | 6'0" | 180 | Sr. | Dunsmuir, California | California |
| T | John Thurman | 6'1" | 225 | Sr. | | Penn |
| G | Charles Hubbard | | | Jr. | | Harvard |
| C | Edgar Garbisch | 6'0" | 185 | So. | Washington, Pennsylvania | Army |
| G | Frank Schwab | 5'11" | 195 | Sr. | Saltsburg, Pennsylvania | Lafayette |
| T | Herb Treat | 6'0" | 190 | | Somerville, Massachusetts | Princeton |
| E | Wendell Taylor | | | Sr. | | Navy |

== Statistical leaders ==
- Team scoring most points: California, 398 (including mid majors, King College, 498)
- Team giving up fewest points: Vanderbilt, 1.8 per game
