= 1922 Southern Conference football season =

- League: NCAA
- Sport: College football
- Duration: September 23, 1922 through December 2, 1922
- Teams: 20

Regular Season
- Season champions: Vanderbilt; Georgia Tech; North Carolina

Football seasons
- 1923

1922 Southern Conference football standings
	Conf.					Overall
Team	W		L		T	W		L		T
North Carolina +	5	–	0	–	0	9	–	1	–	0
Georgia Tech +	4	–	0	–	0	7	–	2	–	0
Vanderbilt * +	3	–	0	–	0	8	–	0	–	1
VPI	3	–	0	–	0	8	–	1	–	1
Florida	2	–	0	–	0	7	–	2	–	0
Auburn	2	–	1	–	0	8	–	2	–	0
Tennessee	3	–	2	–	0	8	–	2	–	0
Alabama	3	–	2	–	1	6	–	3	–	1
Virginia	1	–	1	–	1	4	–	4	–	1
Mississippi A&M	2	–	3	–	0	3	–	4	–	2
Kentucky	1	–	2	–	0	6	–	3	–	0
Clemson	1	–	2	–	0	5	–	4	–	0
Washington and Lee	1	–	2	–	0	5	–	3	–	1
Maryland	1	–	2	–	0	4	–	5	–	1
LSU	1	–	2	–	0	3	–	7	–	0
Georgia	1	–	3	–	1	5	–	4	–	1
Tulane	1	–	4	–	0	4	–	4	–	0
South Carolina	0	–	2	–	0	5	–	4	–	0
Ole Miss	0	–	2	–	0	4	–	5	–	1
NC State	0	–	5	–	0	4	–	6	–	0
+ – Conference co-champions; * – co-member of SIAA

The 1922 Southern Conference football season was the college football games played by the member schools of the Southern Conference as part of the 1922 college football season. The season began on September 23 as part of the 1922 college football season. Conference play began on October 7 with Washington & Lee defeating North Carolina State 14–6 in Lexington.

This was the conference's inaugural season, featuring former members of the Southern Intercollegiate Athletic Association (SIAA) and South Atlantic Intercollegiate Athletic Association (SAIAA). Amongst others, conference co-champion Vanderbilt was still a co-member of the SIAA.

Though North Carolina posted the best conference record, most sources listed either Vanderbilt or Georgia Tech as champion. Vanderbilt was the only school to claim a championship and remain undefeated against all opponents. It posted the nation's number one defense as measured by points against per game and was retroactively selected for a national championship by selector Clyde Berryman.

Intersectionalism was popular. Vanderbilt fought Michigan to a scoreless tie at the inaugural game at Dudley Field, the first football stadium in the south in the style of the Eastern schools. Alabama, which scored 300 points on the season, upset John Heisman's Penn Quakers 9–7.

Auburn's upset of Centre opened the door for the SoCon champion to claim a championship of the South. It was considered one of best teams Auburn turned out in the first half of the 20th century. Centre quarterback Herb Covington had made a "world record" six drop kick field goals against Louisville.

Vanderbilt end Lynn Bomar and Georgia Tech halfback Red Barron were unanimous All-Southern selections and second-team Walter Camp All-Americans.

== Season overview ==
=== Results and team statistics ===
Conf. Rank	Team	Head coach	Overall record	Conf. record	PPG	PAG
1 (tie)	North Carolina	Bob Fetzer/Bill Fetzer	9–1	5–0	19.1	7.2
1 (tie)	Georgia Tech	William Alexander	7–2	4–0	17.4	6.6
1 (tie)	Vanderbilt	Dan McGugin	8–0–1	3–0	19.7	**1.8**
4	VPI	Ben Cubbage	8–1–1	3–0	26.2	3.2
5	Florida	William G. Kline	7–2	2–0	26.7	5.7
6	Auburn	Mike Donahue	8–2	2–1	27.6	4.8
7 (tie)	Tennessee	M. B. Banks	8–2	3–2	23.9	4.5
7 (tie)	Alabama	Xen C. Scott	6–3–1	3–2–1	**30.0**	8.1
9	Virginia	Thomas J. Campbell	4–4–1	1–1–1	11.3	6.7
10	Mississippi A&M	Dudy Noble	3–4–2	2–3	6.2	20.4
11 (tie)	Kentucky	William Juneau	6–3	1–2	18.6	6.2
11 (tie)	Clemson	Doc Stewart	5–4	1–2	18.9	12.1
11 (tie)	Washington and Lee	James DeHart	5–3–1	1–2	23.2	12.0
11 (tie)	Maryland	Curley Byrd	4–5–1	1–2	7.7	13.7
11 (tie)	LSU	Irving Pray	3–7	1–2	7.2	24.4
16	Georgia	Herman Stegeman	5–4–1	1–3–1	17.8	7.7
17	Tulane	Clark Shaughnessy	4–4	1–4	17.0	12.5
18 (tie)	South Carolina	Sol Metzger	5–4–1	0–2	10.2	7.7
18 (tie)	Ole Miss	Roland Cowell	4–5–1	0–2	8.7	18.3
20	NC State	Harry Hartsell	4–6	0–5	10.1	9.2

Key

PPG = Average of points scored per game
PAG = Average of points allowed per game

=== Regular season ===
Index to colors and formatting
Non-conference matchup; SoCon member won
Non-conference matchup; SoCon member lost
Non-conference matchup; tie
Conference matchup

SoCon teams in bold.

==== Week One ====
Date	Visiting team	Home team	Site	Result	Attendance	Reference
September 23	Marion	**Auburn**	Drake Field • Auburn, Alabama	**W** 61–0		
September 23	Newberry	**Georgia**	Sanford Field • Athens, Georgia	**W** 82–13		
September 23	Emory & Henry	**Tennessee**	Shields–Watkins Field • Knoxville, Tennessee	**W** 50–0		
September 23	Hampden-Sydney	**VPI**	Miles Field • Blacksburg, Virginia	**W** 38–0		

==== Week Two ====
Date	Time	Visiting team	Home team	Site	Result	Attendance	Reference
September 29		Erskine	**South Carolina**	Columbia, South Carolina	**W** 13–0		
September 30		Marion	**Alabama**	Denny Field • Tuscaloosa, Alabama	**W** 110–0		
September 30		**Auburn**	Howard	Rickwood Field • Birmingham, Alabama	**W** 72–0		
September 30		Centre	**Clemson**	Riggs Field • Calhoun, South Carolina	**L** 21–0		
September 30		Mercer	**Georgia**	Sanford Field • Athens, Georgia	**W** 41–0		
September 30		Oglethorpe	**Georgia Tech**	Grant Field • Atlanta	**W** 31–6		
September 30		Marshall	**Kentucky**	Stoll Field • Lexington, Kentucky	**W** 16–0		
September 30		Northwestern State	**LSU**	State Field • Baton Rouge, Louisiana	**W** 13–0		
September 30		3rd Army Corps	**Maryland**	Baltimore	**W** 7–0		
September 30		Wake Forest	**North Carolina**	Emerson Field • Chapel Hill, North Carolina	**W** 62–3		
September 30		Randolph-Macon	**North Carolina State**	Riddick Stadium • Raleigh, North Carolina	**W** 20–2		
September 30		Union (TN)	**Ole Miss**	Hemingway Stadium • Oxford, Mississippi	**T** 0–0		
September 30		Carson-Newman	**Tennessee**	Shields–Watkins Field • Knoxville, Tennessee	**W** 32–7		
September 30	3:00 p. m.	Middle Tennessee State	**Vanderbilt**	Dudley Field • Nashville, Tennessee	**W** 38–0		
September 30		George Washington	**Virginia**	Lambeth Field • Charlottesville, Virginia	**W** 34–0		
September 30		King	**VPI**	Miles Field • Blacksburg, Virginia	**W** 25–0		
September 30		Emory & Henry	**Washington & Lee**	Wilson Field • Lexington, Virginia	**W** 85–0		

==== Week Three ====
Date	Visiting team	Home team	Site	Result	Attendance	Reference
October 7	Oglethorpe	**Alabama**	Denny Field • Tuscaloosa, Alabama	**W** 41–0		
October 7	Spring Hill	**Auburn**	Montgomery, Alabama	**W** 19–6		
October 7	**Ole Miss**	Centre	Cheek Field • Danville, Kentucky	**L** 55–0		
October 7	Newberry	**Clemson**	Riggs Field • Calhoun, South Carolina	**W** 57–0		
October 7	Furman	**Florida**	Fleming Field • Gainesville, Florida	**L** 7–6		
October 7	**Georgia**	Chicago	Stagg Field • Chicago	**L** 20–0	18,000	
October 7	Davidson	**Georgia Tech**	Grant Field • Atlanta	**W** 19–0		
October 7	Cincinnati	**Kentucky**	Stoll Field • Lexington, Kentucky	**W** 15–0		
October 7	Loyola	**LSU**	State Field • Baton Rouge, Louisiana	**L** 7–0		
October 7	**Maryland**	Richmond	Richmond, Virginia	**T** 0–0		
October 7	Birmingham–Southern	**Mississippi A&M**	Davis Wade Stadium • Starkville, Mississippi	**W** 14–60		
October 7	**North Carolina**	Yale	New Haven, Connecticut	**L** 18–0		
October 7	Presbyterian	**South Carolina**	Columbia, South Carolina	**W** 6–0		
October 7	Maryvile	**Tennessee**	Shields–Watkins Field • Knoxville, Tennessee	**W** 21–0		
October 7	Mississippi College	**Tulane**	Second Tulane Stadium • New Orleans, Louisiana	**W** 30–0		
October 7	Henderson-Brown	**Vanderbilt**	Dudley Field • Nashville, Tennessee	**W** 33–0		
October 7	**Virginia**	Princeton	Palmer Stadium • Princeton, New Jersey	**L** 5–0		
October 7	**North Carolina State**	**Washington & Lee**	Wilson Field • Lexington, Virginia	**W&L** 14–6		
October 7	William & Mary	**VPI**	Miles Field • Blacksburg, Virginia	**W** 20–6		

==== Week Four ====
Date	Time	Visiting team	Home team	Site	Result	Attendance	Reference
October 12		Duke	**North Carolina**	Chapel Hill, North Carolina	**W** 20–0		
October 13		Presbyterian	**Clemson**	Riggs Field • Calhoun, South Carolina	**W** 13–0		
October 14		**Auburn**	Army	Parade Ground • West Point, New York	**L** 19–6		
October 14		**Florida**	Rollins	Orlando, Florida	**W** 19–0		
October 14		**Georgia**	Furman	Manly Field • Greenville, South Carolina	**W** 7–0		
October 14		**Alabama**	**Georgia Tech**	Grant Field • Atlanta	**GT** 33–7		
October 14		Louisville	**Kentucky**	Stoll Field • Lexington, Kentucky	**W** 73–0		
October 14		**Maryland**	Penn	Franklin Field • Philadelphia	**L** 12–0		
October 14		Rhodes	**Ole Miss**	Hemingway Stadium • Oxford, Mississippi	**W** 23–0		
October 14		Howard	**Mississippi A&M**	Starkville, Mississippi	**T** 0–0		
October 14		**South Carolina**	**North Carolina**	Emerson Field • Chapel Hill, North Carolina	**UNC** 10–7		
October 14		Roanoke	**North Carolina State**	Riddick Stadium • Raleigh, North Carolina	**W** 13–0		
October 14		**Tennessee**	Fort Benning	Columbus, Georgia	**W** 15–0		
October 14		Spring Hill	**Tulane**	Second Tulane Stadium • New Orleans	**W** 30–10		
October 14	2:15 p. m.	Michigan	**Vanderbilt**	Dudley Field • Nashville, Tennessee	**T** 0–0	16,000	
October 14		Richmond	**Virginia**	Lambeth Field • Charlottesville, Virginia	**W** 14–6		
October 14	2:30 p. m.	Centre	**VPI**	Mayo Island Park • Richmond, Virginia	**L** 10–6	12,500	
October 14		Carson-Newman	**Washington & Lee**	Wilson Field • Lexington, Virginia	**W** 13–0		

==== Week Five ====
Date	Time	Visiting team	Home team	Site	Result	Attendance	Reference
October 19		**North Carolina**	**North Carolina State**	Riddick Stadium • Raleigh, North Carolina	**UNC** 14–9		
October 20		Wofford	**South Carolina**	Columbia, South Carolina	**W** 20–0		
October 20		**LSU**	Texas A&M	College Station, Texas	**L** 46–0		
October 21		Sewanee	**Alabama**	Rickwood Field • Birmingham, Alabama	**T** 7–7		
October 21		Mercer	**Auburn**	Drake Field • Auburn, Alabama	**W** 50–6		
October 21		American Legion	**Florida**	Tampa, Florida	**W** 14–0		
October 21		**Tennessee**	**Georgia**	Sanford Field • Athens, Georgia	**UGA** 7–3		
October 21		**Georgia Tech**	Navy	Worden Field • Annapolis, Maryland	**L** 13–0		
October 21		**Kentucky**	Georgetown (KY)	Georgetown, Kentucky	**W** 40–6		
October 21		**Maryland**	Princeton	Palmer Stadium • Princeton, New Jersey	**L** 26–0		
October 21		**Ole Miss**	**Mississippi A&M**	Jackson, Mississippi	**MSA&M** 19–13		
October 21		Fort Benning	**Tulane**	Second Tulane Stadium • New Orleans	**W** 18–0		
October 21	3:00 p. m.	**Vanderbilt**	Texas	Fair Park Stadium • Dallas, Texas	**W** 20–10	11,000	
October 21		VMI	**Virginia**	Lambeth Field • Charlottesville, Virginia	**L** 14–0		
October 21		**VPI**	Davidson	Sprunt Field • Davidson, North Carolina	**T** 7–7	3,000	
October 21		**Washington & Lee**	West Virginia	Laidley Field • Charleston, West Virginia	**T** 12–12		

==== Week Six ====
Date	Visiting team	Home team	Site	Result	Attendance	Reference
October 26	**Clemson**	**South Carolina**	Columbia, South Carolina	**CLEM** 3–0		
October 28	**Alabama**	Texas	Austin, Texas	**L** 19–10		
October 28	Fort Benning	**Auburn**	Drake Field • Auburn, Alabama	**W** 30–0		
October 28	Howard	**Florida**	Fleming Field • Gainesville, Florida	**W** 57–0		
October 28	Oglethorpe	**Georgia**	Sanford Field • Athens, Georgia	**W** 26–6		
October 28	Notre Dame	**Georgia Tech**	Grant Field • Atlanta	**L** 13–3		
October 28	Sewanee	**Kentucky**	Stoll Field • Lexington, Kentucky	**W** 7–0		
October 28	Arkansas	**LSU**	Fair Grounds Field • Shreveport, Louisiana	**L** 40–6		
October 28	**Maryland**	**North Carolina**	Emerson Field • Chapel Hill, North Carolina	**UNC** 27–3		
October 28	**Ole Miss**	**Tennessee**	Shields–Watkins Field • Knoxville, Tennessee	**TENN** 49–0		
October 29	**Mississippi A&M**	**Tulane**	Second Tulane Stadium • New Orleans	**TUL** 26–0		
October 29	Mercer	**Vanderbilt**	Dudley Field • Nashville, Tennessee	**W** 25–0		
October 28	**Virginia**	Johns Hopkins	Baltimore, Maryland	**W** 19–0		
October 28	Catholic	**VPI**	Blacksburg, Virginia	**W** 73–0		
October 28	Lynchburg	**Washington & Lee**	Wilson Field • Lexington, Virginia	**W** 53–0		

==== Week Seven ====
Date	Visiting team	Home team	Site	Result	Attendance	Reference
November 2	Spring Hill	**LSU**	State Field • Baton Rouge, Louisiana	**W** 25–7		
November 4	**Alabama**	Penn	Franklin Field • Philadelphia	**W** 9–7		
November 4	**Auburn**	**Georgia**	Memorial Stadium • Columbus, Georgia	**AUB** 7–3		
November 4	**Clemson**	**Georgia Tech**	Grant Field • Atlanta	**GT** 21–7		
November 4	**Florida**	Harvard	Harvard Stadium • Boston, Massachusetts	**L** 24–0	30,000	
November 4	Centre	**Kentucky**	Stoll Field • Lexington, Kentucky	**L** 27–3		
November 4	**Maryland**	**VPI**	Blacksburg, Virginia	**VPI** 21–0		
November 4	Birmingham–Southern	**Ole Miss**	Hemingway Stadium • Oxford, Mississippi	**W** 6–0		
November 4	**North Carolina**	**Tulane**	Second Tulane Stadium • New Orleans	**UNC** 19–12		
November 4	Davidson	**North Carolina State**	Riddick Stadium • Raleigh, North Carolina	**W** 15–0		
November 4	Ouachita	**Mississippi A&M**	Davis Wade Stadium • Starkville, Mississippi	**T** 7–7		
November 4	Sewanee	**South Carolina**	Columbia, South Carolina	**L** 7–6		
November 4	**Vanderbilt**	**Tennessee**	Shields–Watkins Field • Knoxville, Tennessee	**VAN** 14–6	7,000	
November 4	**Washington & Lee**	**Virginia**	Lambeth Field • Charlottesville, Virginia	**UVA** 22–6		

==== Week Eight ====
Date	Visiting team	Home team	Site	Result	Attendance	Reference
November 7	**LSU**	Rutgers	New York	**L** 25–0		
November 10	**LSU**	**Alabama**	Denny Field • Tuscaloosa, Alabama	**ALA** 47–3		
November 11	**Tulane**	**Auburn**	Montgomery, Alabama	**AUB** 19–0		
November 11	**Clemson**	The Citadel	College Park Stadium • Charleston, South Carolina	**W** 18–0		
November 11	Mississippi College	**Florida**	Plant Field • Tampa, Florida	**W** 58–0	4,000	
November 11	**Georgia**	**Virginia**	Lambeth Field • Charlottesville, Virginia	**T** 6–6		
November 11	Georgetown	**Georgia Tech**	Grant Field • Atlanta	**W** 19–7		
November 11	Hendrix	**Ole Miss**	Hemingway Stadium • Oxford, Mississippi	**W** 13–7		
November 11	**North Carolina**	VMI	Richmond, Virginia	**W** 9–7		
November 11	**North Carolina State**	**VPI**	Norfolk, Virginia	**VPI** 24–0	6,000	
November 11	**Mississippi A&M**	**Tennessee**	Shields–Watkins Field • Knoxville, Tennessee	**TENN** 31–3		
November 11	**Kentucky**	**Vanderbilt**	Dudley Field • Nashville, Tennessee	**VAN** 9–0	12,000	
November 11	**Washington & Lee**	Centre	Louisville, Kentucky	**L** 27–6		

==== Week Nine ====
Date	Time	Visiting team	Home team	Site	Result	Attendance	Reference
November 16		The Citadel	**South Carolina**	County Fairgrounds • Orangeburg, South Carolina	**W** 13–0		
November 18		Centre	**Auburn**	Rickwood Field • Birmingham, Alabama	**W** 6–0		
November 18		Erskine	**Clemson**	Riggs Field • Calhoun, South Carolina	**W** 52–0		
November 18		**Alabama**	**Kentucky**	Stoll Field • Lexington, Kentucky	**UK** 6–0		
November 18		**Florida**	**Tulane**	Second Tulane Stadium • New Orleans	**FLA** 27–6	6,000	
November 18		**North Carolina State**	**Georgia Tech**	Grant Field • Atlanta	**GT** 17–0		
November 18		**Maryland**	Johns Hopkins	Baltimore, Maryland	**W** 3–0		
November 18		**Ole Miss**	Tennessee Medical College	Memphis, Tennessee	**L** 32–0		
November 18		**Mississippi A&M**	**LSU**	State Field • Baton Rouge, Louisiana	**MSA&M** 7–0		
November 18		Davidson	**North Carolina**	Charlotte, North Carolina	**W** 20–6		
November 18		Sewanee	**Tennessee**	Chamberlain Field • Chattanooga, Tennessee	**W** 18–7		
November 18	3:00 p. m.	**Vanderbilt**	**Georgia**	Sanford Field • Athens, Georgia	**VAN** 12–0		
November 18		**Virginia**	West Virginia	WVU Athletic Field • Morgantown, West Virginia	**L** 13–0		
November 18		**VPI**	**Washington & Lee**	Lynchburg, Virginia	**VPI** 41–6		

==== Week Ten ====
Date	Time	Visiting team	Home team	Site	Result	Attendance	Reference
November 25		**Georgia**	**Alabama**	Cramton Bowl • Montgomery, Alabama	**ALA** 10–6		
November 25		**Clemson**	Furman	Manly Field • Greenville, South Carolina	**L** 20–6		
November 25		**Florida**	Oglethorpe	Atlanta	**W** 12–0		
November 25		**Maryland**	Catholic	Washington, D. C.	**W** 54–0		
November 25		Drake	**Mississippi A&M**	Davis Wade Stadium • Starkville, Mississippi	**L** 48–6		
November 25		**Ole Miss**	Fort Benning	Columbus, Georgia	**L** 14–13		
November 25		**North Carolina State**	Wake Forest	Wake Forest, North Carolina	**W** 32–0		
November 25	2:00 p. m.	Sewanee	**Vanderbilt**	Dudley Field • Nashville, Tennessee	**W** 26–0	20,000	

==== Week Eleven ====
Date	Time	Visiting team	Home team	Site	Result	Attendance	Reference
November 30		**Mississippi A&M**	**Alabama**	Rickwood Field • Birmingham, Alabama	**ALA** 59–0		
November 30		**Auburn**	**Georgia Tech**	Grant Field • Atlanta	**GT** 14–6		
November 30		**Tulane**	**LSU**	State Field • Baton Rouge, Louisiana	**LSU** 25–14		
November 30		**Maryland**	**North Carolina State**	Riddick Stadium • Raleigh, North Carolina	**MD** 7–6		
November 30		**Ole Miss**	Millsaps	Jackson, Mississippi	**W** 19–7		
November 30		**North Carolina**	**Virginia**	Lambeth Field • Charlottesville, Virginia	**UNC** 10–7		
November 30		**Kentucky**	**Tennessee**	Shields–Watkins Field • Knoxville, Tennessee	**TENN** 14–7		
November 30		**South Carolina**	Centre	Danville, Kentucky	**L** 42–0		
November 30	2:30 p. m.	VMI	**VPI**	Roanoke, Virginia	**W** 7–3	15,000	
November 30		**Washington & Lee**	Johns Hopkins	Baltimore, Maryland	**W** 14–0		
December 2		**Clemson**	**Florida**	Jacksonville, Florida	**FLA** 47–14		

== Awards and honors ==
=== All-Americans ===
- E – Lynn Bomar, Vanderbilt (WC-2; WE-3 [tackle]; BE; FM-1)
- T – Joe Bennett, Georgia (BE)
- G – Oscar Davis, Georgia Tech (LP-1; BE)
- QB – Doc Kuhn, Vanderbilt (BE)
- HB – Red Barron, Georgia Tech (WC-2 [fb]; BE; FM-2)
- FB – John Fletcher, Georgia (BE)

=== All-Southern team ===
The following is the composite All-Southern team compiled from twenty four coaches and sporting editors of the South, each of whom received trophies from the Atlanta Journal:

Position	Name	First-team selectors	Team
QB	Herb Covington	AJ	Centre
HB	Red Barron	AJ	Georgia Tech
HB	John Shirey	AJ	Auburn
FB	John Fletcher	AJ	Georgia
E	Lynn Bomar	AJ	Vanderbilt
T	Albert Staton	AJ	Georgia Tech
G	Oscar Davis	AJ	Georgia Tech
C	Claire Frye	AJ	Georgia Tech
G	Puss Whelchel	AJ	Georgia
T	Joe Bennett	AJ	Georgia
E	Red Roberts	AJ	Centre

== See also ==
- 1922 Michigan vs. Vanderbilt football game
- 1922 Alabama vs. Penn football game
