= 1922 VPI Gobblers football team =

American college football season

1922 VPI Gobblers football
- Conference: Southern Conference
- Record: 8–1–1 (3–0 SoCon)
- Head coach: B. C. Cubbage (2nd season)
- Captain: Harry Judson Hardwick
- Home stadium: Miles Field

1922 Southern Conference football standings
	Conf.					Overall
Team	W		L		T	W		L		T
North Carolina +	5	–	0	–	0	9	–	1	–	0
Georgia Tech +	4	–	0	–	0	7	–	2	–	0
Vanderbilt * +	3	–	0	–	0	8	–	0	–	1
VPI	3	–	0	–	0	8	–	1	–	1
Florida	2	–	0	–	0	7	–	2	–	0
Auburn	2	–	1	–	0	8	–	2	–	0
Tennessee	3	–	2	–	0	8	–	2	–	0
Alabama	3	–	2	–	1	6	–	3	–	1
Virginia	1	–	1	–	1	4	–	4	–	1
Mississippi A&M	2	–	3	–	0	3	–	4	–	2
Kentucky	1	–	2	–	0	6	–	3	–	0
Clemson	1	–	2	–	0	5	–	4	–	0
Washington and Lee	1	–	2	–	0	5	–	3	–	1
Maryland	1	–	2	–	0	4	–	5	–	1
LSU	1	–	2	–	0	3	–	7	–	0
Georgia	1	–	3	–	1	5	–	4	–	1
Tulane	1	–	4	–	0	4	–	4	–	0
South Carolina	0	–	2	–	0	5	–	4	–	0
Ole Miss	0	–	2	–	0	4	–	5	–	1
NC State	0	–	5	–	0	4	–	6	–	0
+ – Conference co-champions; * – co-member of SIAA

The 1922 VPI Gobblers football team represented Virginia Polytechnic Institute in the 1922 college football season. The team was led by their head coach B. C. Cubbage and finished with a record of eight wins, one loss and one tie (8–1–1).

== Schedule ==
Date	Time	Opponent	Site	Result	Attendance	Source
September 23		Hampden–Sydney*	Miles Field; Blacksburg, VA	W 38–0		
September 30		King*	Miles Field; Blacksburg, VA	W 25–6		
October 7		William & Mary*	Miles Field; Blacksburg, VA	W 20–6		
October 14	2:30 p.m.	vs. Centre*	Mayo Island Park; Richmond, VA	L 6–10	12,500	
October 21		at Davidson*	Sprunt Field; Davidson, NC	T 7–7	3,000	
October 28		Catholic*	Miles Field; Blacksburg, VA	W 73–0		
November 4		Maryland	Miles Field; Blacksburg, VA	W 21–0		
November 11	2:30 p.m.	vs. NC State	League Park; Norfolk, VA	W 24–0	6,000	
November 18		vs. Washington and Lee	Fair Grounds; Lynchburg, VA	W 41–6		
November 30	2:30 p.m.	vs. VMI*	Fair Grounds; Roanoke, VA (rivalry)	W 7–3	12,000–16,000	
*Non-conference game; All times are in Eastern time

== Before the season ==
The 1921 VPI Gobblers football team compiled a 7–3 record and were led by B. C. Cubbage in his first season as head coach.

On July 11, 1922, the Roanoke, Virginia Association of Commerce stated that they were worried about losing the rights to the annual VPI-VMI rivalry game, which had been played in Roanoke for the past 11 seasons. They stated that two other cities were trying to acquire the rights to the annual game and that the biggest obstacle for Roanoke was that the contract stated that a stadium containing a minimum of 10,000 seats must be available. At the time, the largest stadium in Roanoke had approximately 5,000 seats.

== Game summaries ==
=== Hampden–Sydney ===
VPI's first game of the season was a victory over Hampden–Sydney at Miles Field. In the first quarter, VPI's Sutton returned a kickoff 70 yards, but Hampden–Sydney was able to stop VPI from scoring and started their drive on their own two-yard line. Hampden–Sydney had to punt the ball and VPI worked their way down the field, resulting in a touchdown by Gettle. In the second quarter, VPI scored again when Flory rushed for a touchdown and Tilson successfully kicked the extra point. At the beginning of the second half, VPI received the kickoff and Sutton ran 50 yards to the endzone. However, there was a holding penalty and the touchdown was nullified. VPI then scored another rushing touchdown. Later in the third quarter, VPI's Sutton ran around Hampden–Sydney's left side for a 45-yard gain. Beck then entered the game and scored another touchdown. VPI's second team entered the game in the fourth quarter and score two more touchdowns.

The starting lineup for VPI was: Hardwick (left end), Tilson (left tackle), Moore (left guard), Baker (center), Sherertz (right guard), Graham (right tackle), Wilson (right end), Sutton (quarterback), Buchanan (left halfback), Flory (right halfback), Gettle (fullback). The substitutes were: Beck, Glaze, Greene, Liebrecht, Linkous, Moran, Nutter, Owens, Ray, Rea, Roberts, Sanders, Saunders and Wallace.

The starting lineup for Hampden–Sydney was: Robert Brenaman (left end), William Fuqua (left tackle), William Saunders (left guard), A. J. McKelway (center), James Hall (right guard), Cecil Blankenship (right tackle), Robert Stoltz (right end), Hugh Brenaman (quarterback), Lorraine Sanders (left halfback), William Day (right halfback), Rex Blankenship (fullback). The substitutes were: J. O. Durham, Hughes, Hurt, Graham Lacy, Edwin Ott, Smith and Bailey Tyson.

=== King ===
After their victory over Hampden–Sydney, VPI played King College at Miles Field.

The starting lineup for VPI was: Hardwick (left end), Tilson (left tackle), Moore (left guard), Baker (center), Sherertz (right guard), Greene (right tackle), Wilson (right end), Wallace (quarterback), Sutton (left halfback), Buchanan (right halfback), Gettle (fullback). The substitutes were: Beck, Flory, Graham, Moran, Ray, Rea, Rhodes, Roberts, Sanders, Saunders and Sharpe.

The starting lineup for King was: Moore (left end), Ralph Stowell (left tackle), Dick Fitzgerald (left guard), Swede Swanson (center), Dewey Greehoe (right guard), John Fletcher (right tackle), Tot Rhodes (right end), Max Osburn (quarterback), Elton Sharp (left halfback), James Orr (right halfback), Finnefrock (fullback). The substitutes were: O'Hara and Fred Reuning.

=== William & Mary ===
The starting lineup for VPI was: Hardwick (left end), Tilson (left tackle), Rea (left guard), Moran (center), Sherertz (right guard), Graham (right tackle), Wilson (right end), Wallace (quarterback), Rutherford (left halfback), Flory (right halfback), Beck (fullback). The substitutes were: Glaze, Greene, Liebrecht, Moore, Nutter, Owens, Ray, Rhodes, Roberts, Sanders, Saunders and Whitehead.

The starting lineup for William & Mary was: Jack Chalkley (left end), Frances Elliott (left tackle), Leslie Parsons (left guard), John Todd (center), Russell House (right guard), T. J. Young (right tackle), Earnest Dietz (right end), George Flanders (quarterback), Harvey Hastings (left halfback), C. H. Cain (right halfback), Levvy (fullback). The substitutes were: Win Charles, C. V. Cofer, Leo Haskell, Winston Irwin, Thomas Jordan, Paul Keister and Fairmount White.

=== Centre ===
Centre vs. VPI

Team	1	2	3	4	Total
• Centre	0	0	0	10	10
VPI	6	0	0	0	6

- Date: October 14, 1922
- Location: Mayo Island Park
  Richmond, VA
- Game start: 2:30 p.m.
- Game attendance: 12,500
- Referee: Paul Magoffin

The VPI-Centre game was almost cancelled after Centre College requested that the date be changed or that the game be played in Danville, Kentucky and VPI declined both requests.

The starting lineup for VPI was: Hardwick (left end), Tilson (left tackle), Rea (left guard), Baker (center), Sherertz (right guard), Graham (right tackle), Wilson (right end), Wallace (quarterback), Sutton (left halfback), Rutherford (right halfback), Gettle (fullback). The substitutes were: Beck, Flory and Moore.

The starting lineup for Centre was: Red Roberts (left end), Howard Lynch (left tackle), George Jones (left guard), Ed Kubale (center), Frank Rubarth (right guard), Ben Cregor (right tackle), Cliff Lemon (right end), Herb Covington (quarterback), Thomas Bartlett (left halfback), Hall Snowday (right halfback), John Tanner (fullback). The substitutes were: Hope Hudgins and John Hunter.

=== Davidson ===
VPI at Davidson

Team	1	2	3	4	Total
VPI	0	7	0	0	7
Davidson	0	7	0	0	7

- Date: October 21, 1922
- Location: Sprunt Field
  Davidson, NC
- Game attendance: 3,000
- Referee: Jack Gass

The starting lineup for VPI was: Hardwick (left end), Tilson (left tackle), Rea (left guard), Baker (center), Sherertz (right guard), Graham (right tackle), Wilson (right end), Wallace (quarterback), Flory (left halfback), Rutherford (right halfback), Gettle (fullback). The substitutes were: Buchanan, Moore, Ray, Rhodes and Sutton.

The starting lineup for Davidson was: Charles Davis (left end), Charles Clark (left tackle), George Sorrells (left guard), R. Marion Brice (center), Samuel Davis (right guard), J. C. McMasters (right tackle), Elias Faison (right end), James Hendrix (quarterback), James DeArmon (left halfback), William Shepherd (right halfback), John Hunt (fullback). The substitutes were: Leonard Dick, Red Laird, William Martin and Moore.

=== Catholic ===
The starting lineup for VPI was: Hardwick (left end), Tilson (left tackle), Moore (left guard), Baker (center), Sherertz (right guard), Moran (right tackle), Rhodes (right end), Wallace (quarterback), Sutton (left halfback), Rutherford (right halfback), Gettle (fullback). The substitutes were: Adams, Beck, Buchanan, Donovan, Flory, Givens, Graham, Greene, Nutter, Owens, Sanders and Saunders.

The starting lineup for Catholic was: H. R. Moore (left end), John Whalen (left tackle), Walter May (left guard), B. L. Eberts (center), T. J. Tobin (right guard), B. J. Vorsanger (right tackle), Eddie Lynch (right end), Brennan (quarterback), James Freney (left halfback), Smith (right halfback), Neary (fullback). The substitutes were: Costello, Ford and Reilly.

=== Maryland ===
Maryland vs. VPI

Team	1	2	3	4	Total
Maryland	0	0	0	0	0
• VPI	0	14	0	7	21

- Date: November 4, 1922
- Location: Miles Field
  Blacksburg, VA
- Referee: Jack Gass

The starting lineup for VPI was: Hardwick (left end), Tilson (left tackle), Rea (left guard), Baker (center), Sherertz (right guard), Greene (right tackle), Wilson (right end), Wallace (quarterback), Beck (left halfback), Buchanan (right halfback), Gettle (fullback). The substitutes were: Flory, Glaze, Graham, Moore, Moran, Nutter, Owens, Rhodes, Roberts and Saunders.

The starting lineup for Maryland was: John Groves (left end), Andy Nesbit (left tackle), John Moore (left guard), Caleb Bailey (center), John Hough (right guard), Joseph C. Burger (right tackle), Cecil Branner (right end), Henry Guervich (quarterback), Ed Pugh (left halfback), George Heine (right halfback), Jack McQuade (fullback). The substitutes were: Beers, Kirkland Besley, Lester Bosley, Mac Brewer, Walter Bromley, Endslow, Martin, George Pollock, Eddie Semler and Smith.

=== NC State ===
NC State vs. VPI

Team	1	2	3	4	Total
NC State	0	0	0	0	0
• VPI	0	10	14	0	24

- Date: November 11, 1922
- Location: League Park
  Norfolk, VA
- Referee: McCormick (Bucknell)

The starting lineup for VPI was: Hardwick (left end), Tilson (left tackle), Rea (left guard), Baker (center), Sherertz (right guard), Graham (right tackle), Wilson (right end), Wallace (quarterback), Rutherford (left halfback), Buchanan (right halfback), Gettle (fullback). The substitutes were: Beck, Flory, Liebrecht, Moore, Owens, Rhodes, Roberts and Saunders.

The starting lineup for NC State was: Samuel Wallis (left end), William Cox (left tackle), W. L. Baker (left guard), Thomas Bostian (center), Percy Beatty (right guard), Averette Floyd (right tackle), Robert Holland (right end), Robert Long (quarterback), Ernest Randolph (left halfback), Thomas Park (right halfback), Gaither Lassiter (fullback). The substitutes were: Dill, Chelsie Eller, John Jennette, William McPherson, Earl Pasour, Joseph Ripple and David VanSant.

=== Washington and Lee ===
Washington & Lee vs. VPI

Team	1	2	3	4	Total
W&L	0	0	0	6	6
• VPI	7	10	14	10	41

- Date: November 18, 1922
- Location: Fair Grounds
  Lynchburg, VA
- Game weather: "Drizzling rain"
- Referee: Jack Gass

The starting lineup for VPI was: Hardwick (left end), Tilson (left tackle), Rea (left guard), Baker (center), Sherertz (right guard), Graham (right tackle), Wilson (right end), Wallace (quarterback), Rutherford (left halfback), Buchanan (right halfback), Gettle (fullback). The substitutes were: Beck, Flory, Liebrecht, Moore, Nutter, Rhodes, Roberts and Saunders.

The starting lineup for Washington and Lee was: Joel McDonald (left end), Warren E. Tilson (left tackle), Douglas Bemis (left guard), Charles Terry (center), C. L. Walters (right guard), R. C. Potts (right tackle), John McVay (right end), Preston Hatcher (quarterback), Mayo Hamilton (left halfback), Henry McMillan (right halfback), Eddie Cameron (fullback). The substitutes were: B. H. Arbogast, Joseph Atkins, Richard Beard, Thomas Bemis, Harry Dawson, Archie Hawkins, H. M. Taylor, James Kay Thomas and George Vogel.

=== VMI ===
VMI vs. VPI

Team	1	2	3	4	Total
VMI	3	0	0	0	3
• VPI	7	0	0	0	7

- Date: November 30, 1922
- Location: Fair Grounds
  Roanoke, VA
- Game start: 2:30 p.m.
- Game attendance: 12,000–16,000
- Game weather: "Ideal"
- Referee: Robert Kent Gooch

The starting lineup for VPI was: Hardwick (left end), Tilson (left tackle), Sherertz (left guard), Baker (center), Rea (right guard), Graham (right tackle), Wilson (right end), Wallace (quarterback), Buchanan (left halfback), Rutherford (right halfback), Beck (fullback). The substitutes were: Flory, Moore, Rhodes and Sutton.

The starting lineup for VMI was: Mortimer Watkins (left end), Charlie Barbour (left tackle), Thomas Gray (left guard), Francis Ferguson (center), William Harrison (right guard), Robert Hunt (right tackle), Eugene Carlton (right end), Farley (quarterback), Edward Ryder (left halfback), Donald MacGregor (right halfback), Windy White (fullback). The substitutes were: Paul Caldwell, Hal Costolo, Worthington Faulkner and Carl Hammond.

== After the season ==
In December 1922, the VPI players elected Harry McMullen Sutton as captain of the 1923 VPI Gobblers football team.

== Players ==
=== Roster ===
VPI 1922 roster
Adams; Robert Baker; C. O. Beck; Raymond Buchanan; Donovan; Charles Flory; Herbert "Pasco" Gettle; Givens; Glaze; Samuel Oscar Graham; Arthur Trevilian Greene; Harry Judson Hardwick (Capt.); Edward Frank Liebrecht; Linkous; Ralph Moore; Joseph Henry Moran; Oscar Price Nutter	Owens; James Edward Ray; Robert Rea; Charles Rhodes; Arthur Roberts; Donald Rutherford; Sanders; Saunders; Sharpe; William Sherertz; Harry Sutton (Capt.); Sumner D. Tilson; John "Rip" Wallace; Whitehead; Williams; Victor Peters Wilson

=== Monogram Club members ===
Seventeen players received monograms for their participation on the 1922 VPI team.

Player	Hometown	Notes
Robert Lindsay Baker	Norfolk, Virginia	
C. O. Beck	Erwin, Tennessee	
Raymond Madison Buchanan	Saltville, Virginia	
Charles Laurence Flory	Porterville, California	
Herbert Houston "Pasco" Gettle		
Samuel Oscar Graham	Hamilton, Virginia	
Arthur Trevilian Greene		
Harry Judson Hardwick	Blacksburg, Virginia	The 22nd head football coach at the United States Naval Academy in Annapolis, Maryland.
Ralph Erskine Moore	Augusta County, Virginia	World War I veteran (USAAS).
Robert James Rea		
Charles Douglas Rhodes	Bristol, Virginia	World War I veteran (Navy).
Donald Hurt Rutherford	Bristol, Virginia	
William Shields Sherertz	Roanoke, Virginia	
Harry McMullen Sutton	Suffolk, Virginia	
Sumner Dewey "Tex" Tilson	Childress, Texas	VPI's head football coach for one season, in 1942, compiling a record of 7–2–1.
John Graham "Rip" Wallace	Hampton, Virginia	
Victor Peters Wilson	Hampton, Virginia	

== Coaching and training staff ==
- Head coach: B. C. Cubbage
- Assistant coach: William L. Younger
- Graduate Manager: Sally Miles
- Manager: Samuel Russell Bailey
- Freshman head coach: Henry Redd
- Freshman Manager: W. W. Krebs
