= 1922 Georgia Bulldogs football team =

American college football season

1922 Georgia Bulldogs football
- Conference: Southern Conference
- Record: 5–4–1 (1–3–1 SoCon)
- Head coach: Herman Stegeman (3rd season)
- Captain: Hugh Whelchel
- Home stadium: Sanford Field

1922 Southern Conference football standings
	Conf.					Overall
Team	W		L		T	W		L		T
North Carolina +	5	–	0	–	0	9	–	1	–	0
Georgia Tech +	4	–	0	–	0	7	–	2	–	0
Vanderbilt * +	3	–	0	–	0	8	–	0	–	1
VPI	3	–	0	–	0	8	–	1	–	1
Florida	2	–	0	–	0	7	–	2	–	0
Auburn	2	–	1	–	0	8	–	2	–	0
Tennessee	3	–	2	–	0	8	–	2	–	0
Alabama	3	–	2	–	1	6	–	3	–	1
Virginia	1	–	1	–	1	4	–	4	–	1
Mississippi A&M	2	–	3	–	0	3	–	4	–	2
Kentucky	1	–	2	–	0	6	–	3	–	0
Clemson	1	–	2	–	0	5	–	4	–	0
Washington and Lee	1	–	2	–	0	5	–	3	–	1
Maryland	1	–	2	–	0	4	–	5	–	1
LSU	1	–	2	–	0	3	–	7	–	0
Georgia	1	–	3	–	1	5	–	4	–	1
Tulane	1	–	4	–	0	4	–	4	–	0
South Carolina	0	–	2	–	0	5	–	4	–	0
Ole Miss	0	–	2	–	0	4	–	5	–	1
NC State	0	–	5	–	0	4	–	6	–	0
+ – Conference co-champions; * – co-member of SIAA

The 1922 Georgia Bulldogs football team represented the University of Georgia during the 1922 college football season. The team had a 5–4–1 record and was the first Georgia team to compete in the newly formed Southern Conference, which was formed when a group of teams left the Southern Intercollegiate Athletic Association (SIAA) after the end of the 1921 season. This was Georgia's third and final season under the guidance of head coach Herman Stegeman, though he remained athletic director.

== Schedule ==
Date	Opponent	Site	Result	Attendance	Source
September 23	Newberry*	Sanford Field; Athens, GA	W 82–13		
September 30	Mercer*	Sanford Field; Athens, GA	W 41–0		
October 7	at Chicago*	Stagg Field; Chicago, IL	L 0–20	18,000	
October 14	at Furman*	Manly Field; Greenville, SC	W 7–0		
October 21	Tennessee	Sanford Field; Athens, GA (rivalry)	W 7–3		
October 27	Oglethorpe*	Sanford Field; Athens, GA	W 26–6		
November 4	vs. Auburn	Memorial Stadium; Columbus, GA (rivalry)	L 3–7		
November 11	at Virginia	Lambeth Field; Charlottesville, VA	T 6–6		
November 18	Vanderbilt^{†}	Sanford Field; Athens, GA (rivalry)	L 0–12		
November 25	at Alabama	Cramton Bowl; Montgomery, AL (rivalry)	L 6–10	10,000	
*Non-conference game; ^{†}Homecoming

== Game summaries ==
=== Newberry ===
Teany Randall scored 19 points on three touchdowns and one PAT.

=== Mercer ===
The September 30, 1922 game against Mercer, was the 200th football game played by Georgia. Including the victory over Mercer, Georgia's cumulative record over its first 200 games was 107–72–21, a winning percentage of .588.

Randall scored 29 points in the Mercer game. He had a 1-yard touchdown plunge followed by scores of 74 yards, a 90-yard interception return, and a 34-yard reception Dick Mulvehill and five PATs.

The starting lineup was: Boney (left end), Taylor (left tackle), Grayson (left guard), Frier (center), Vandiver (right guard), Bennett (right tackle), Butler (right end), Collings (quarterback), Thompson (left halfback), Randall (right halfback), Tanner (fullback).

=== Chicago ===
In front of 18,000 in Chicago, Georgia lost to the Maroons 20–0. In the first quarter, Joe Bennett caused a fumble on a Chicago punt return, and Randall ran it to Chicago's 10-yard line before Georgia fumbled and the chance to score was lost.

The starting line up was: Boney (left end), Bennett (left tackle), Whelchel (left guard), Frier (center), Vandiver (guard), Taylor (right tackle), Butler (right end), Collings (quarterback), Randall (left halfback), Thompson (right halfback), Fletcher (fullback).

=== Furman ===
In Greenville, South Carolina, Georgia beat Furman 7–0. The starting lineup was: Mason (left end), Bennett (left tackle), Joselove (left guard), Frier (center), Vandiver (right guard), Taylor (right tackle), Butler (right end), Collings (quarterback), Post (left halfback), Thompson (right halfback), Fletcher (fullback).

=== Tennessee ===
The Bulldogs defeated the Tennessee Volunteers 7–3. A pass from Mulvehill to Smack Thompson got the touchdown. The starting lineup was: Richardson (left end), Taylor (left tackle), Whelchel (left guard), Boney (center), Vandiver (right guard), Bennett (right tackle), Collings (right end), Mulvihill (quarterback), Thompson (left halfback), Fletcher (right halfback), Tanner (fullback).

=== Oglethorpe ===
The Bulldogs beat in-state foe Oglethorpe 26–6.

=== Auburn ===
Auburn defeated Georgia 7–3. The starting lineup was: Richardson (left end), Bennett (left tackle), Whelchel (left guard), Boney (center), Vandiver (right guard), Taylor (right tackle), Collings (right end), Mulvihill (quarterback), Post (left halfback), Thompson (right halfback), Tanner (fullback).

=== Virginia ===
At Charlottesville, Georgia fought Virginia to a 6–6 tie.

=== Vanderbilt ===
Vanderbilt at Georgia

Team	1	2	3	4	Total
• Vanderbilt	6	0	6	0	12
Georgia	0	0	0	0	0

- Date: November 18
- Location: Sanford Field
  Athens, Georgia
- Game start: 3:00 p. m.
- Referee: Jogger Elcock

The Georgia Bulldogs played Vanderbilt for their homecoming. Georgia was hungry to finally beat Vanderbilt and this game was at the top of its list of desirable victories. The Commodores were equally eager to defeat the Bulldogs and claim a Southern championship. Vanderbilt won 12–0, with Bomar described as a "holy terror" to the Bulldogs by W. C. Munday. As it had intended, Vanderbilt left the game as favorite to be crowned champions of the South. The 1922 game between Georgia and Vanderbilt marked the last time Georgia had lost two consecutive games at home to Vanderbilt, having also lost 46 to 0 at Athens in 1912.

The starting lineup was: Richardson (left end), Bennett (left tackle), Vandiver (left guard), Boney (center), whelchel (right guard), Taylor (right tackle), Anderson (right end), Collings (quarterback), Randall (left halfback), Fletcher (right halfback), Tanner (fullback).

=== Alabama ===
Georgia at Alabama

Team	1	2	3	4	Total
Georgia	6	0	0	0	6
• Alabama	0	7	3	0	10

- Date: November 25
- Location: Cramton Bowl
  Montgomery, AL
- Game attendance: 10,000

Playing their first ever game at the Cramton Bowl, the Alabama Crimson Tide overcame an early 6–0 deficit and defeated the Bulldogs 10–6. The Bulldogs scored first after John Fletcher recovered an Allen Graham MacCartee fumble and returned it 96-yards for a touchdown.

Alabama responded with a short Charles Bartlett touchdown run in the second and with a 20-yard Bartlett field goal in the third for the 10–6 win.

== Awards and honors ==
Tackle Joe Bennett and fullback John Fletcher appear on Billy Evans's All-America, "National Honor Roll". One writer states, "Prior to the 1960s, Bennett is likely Georgia's most outstanding tackle." Guard and captain Hugh Whelchel was All-Southern along with Bennett and Fletcher.
