= 1922 Georgia Tech Golden Tornado football team =

American college football season

1922 Georgia Tech Golden Tornado football

SoCon co-champion
- Conference: Southern Conference
- Record: 7–2 (4–0 SoCon)
- Head coach: William Alexander (3rd season)
- Offensive scheme: Jump shift
- Captain: Red Barron
- Home stadium: Grant Field

Uniform
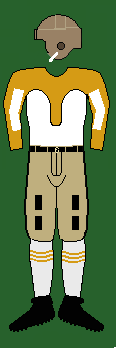

1922 Southern Conference football standings
| | Conf. | | | | | Overall |
| Team | W | | L | | T | W | | L | | T |
|---|---|---|---|---|---|---|---|---|---|---|
| North Carolina + | 5 | – | 0 | – | 0 | 9 | – | 1 | – | 0 |
| Georgia Tech + | 4 | – | 0 | – | 0 | 7 | – | 2 | – | 0 |
| Vanderbilt * + | 3 | – | 0 | – | 0 | 8 | – | 0 | – | 1 |
| VPI | 3 | – | 0 | – | 0 | 8 | – | 1 | – | 1 |
| Florida | 2 | – | 0 | – | 0 | 7 | – | 2 | – | 0 |
| Auburn | 2 | – | 1 | – | 0 | 8 | – | 2 | – | 0 |
| Tennessee | 3 | – | 2 | – | 0 | 8 | – | 2 | – | 0 |
| Alabama | 3 | – | 2 | – | 1 | 6 | – | 3 | – | 1 |
| Virginia | 1 | – | 1 | – | 1 | 4 | – | 4 | – | 1 |
| Mississippi A&M | 2 | – | 3 | – | 0 | 3 | – | 4 | – | 2 |
| Kentucky | 1 | – | 2 | – | 0 | 6 | – | 3 | – | 0 |
| Clemson | 1 | – | 2 | – | 0 | 5 | – | 4 | – | 0 |
| Washington and Lee | 1 | – | 2 | – | 0 | 5 | – | 3 | – | 1 |
| Maryland | 1 | – | 2 | – | 0 | 4 | – | 5 | – | 1 |
| LSU | 1 | – | 2 | – | 0 | 3 | – | 7 | – | 0 |
| Georgia | 1 | – | 3 | – | 1 | 5 | – | 4 | – | 1 |
| Tulane | 1 | – | 4 | – | 0 | 4 | – | 4 | – | 0 |
| South Carolina | 0 | – | 2 | – | 0 | 5 | – | 4 | – | 0 |
| Ole Miss | 0 | – | 2 | – | 0 | 4 | – | 5 | – | 1 |
| NC State | 0 | – | 5 | – | 0 | 4 | – | 6 | – | 0 |
+ – Conference co-champions; * – co-member of SIAA

The 1922 Georgia Tech Golden Tornado football team (Note: Although Georgia Tech's teams are officially known as the "Yellow Jackets", northern writers called the team the "Golden Tornado" in 1917; the name was commonly used until 1928 and for many years afterwards as an alternate nickname. It may have been coined by Morgan Blake.) represented the Georgia Tech Golden Tornado of the Georgia Institute of Technology during the 1922 Southern Conference football season. The Tornado was coached by William Alexander in his third year as head coach, compiling a record of 7–2 (4–0 SoCon) and outscoring opponents 157 to 59.

Red Barron made Walter Camp's second-team All-America.

== Before the season ==
1922 is the first season of the new Southern Conference, and freshmen were barred from play.

In the line, at either end one finds brothers John and Al Staton. At guard was Oscar Davis, who with Barron was later named to an All-Tech Alexander era team.

== Schedule ==
| Date | Opponent | Site | Result | Attendance | Source |
|---|---|---|---|---|---|
| September 30 | Oglethorpe* | Grant Field; Atlanta, GA | W 31–6 | | |
| October 7 | Davidson* | Grant Field; Atlanta, GA | W 19–0 | | |
| October 14 | Alabama | Grant Field; Atlanta, GA (rivalry) | W 33–7 | | |
| October 21 | at Navy* | Worden Field; Annapolis, MD | L 0-13 | 20,000 | |
| October 28 | Notre Dame* | Grant Field; Atlanta, GA (rivalry) | L 3-13 | 18,000–20,000 | |
| November 4 | Clemson | Grant Field; Atlanta, GA (rivalry) | W 21–7 | | |
| November 11 | Georgetown* | Grant Field; Atlanta, GA | W 19–7 | | |
| November 18 | NC State | Grant Field; Atlanta, GA | W 17–0 | | |
| November 30 | Auburn | Grant Field; Atlanta, GA (rivalry) | W 14–6 | 26,000 | |
*Non-conference game

== Game summaries ==
=== Oglethorpe ===
Oglethorpe at Georgia Tech

| Team | 1 | 2 | 3 | 4 | Total |
|---|---|---|---|---|---|
| Oglethorpe | 0 | 0 | 0 | 6 | 6 |
| • Ga. Tech | 6 | 7 | 6 | 12 | 31 |

- Date: September 30
- Location: Grant Field
  Atlanta, GA
- Referee: Jogger Elcock

The season opened with a 31–6 defeat over the Oglethorpe Stormy Petrels. Red Barron scored two touchdowns, and Oglethorpe's Adrian Maurer had a 90-yard touchdown run.

The starting lineup was J. Staton (left end), Johnson (left tackle), McIntyre (left guard), Frye (center), Davis (right guard), Lyman (right tackle), A. Staton (right end), McDonough (quarterback), Barron (left halfback), Brewster (right halfback), Hunt (fullback).

=== Davidson ===
In the second week of play, Tech beat the Davidson Wildcats 19–0. Red Barron ran for 116 yards and two touchdowns despite playing for only part of the contest.

The starting lineup was J. Staton (left end), Johnson (left tackle), McIntyre (left guard), Frye (center), Davis (right guard), A. Staton (right tackle), Mitchel(right end), McDonough (quarterback), Barron (left halfback), Rather (right halfback), Hunt (fullback).

=== Alabama ===
Alabama at Georgia Tech

| Team | 1 | 2 | 3 | 4 | Total |
|---|---|---|---|---|---|
| Alabama | 0 | 0 | 7 | 0 | 7 |
| • Ga. Tech | 21 | 12 | 0 | 0 | 33 |

- Date: October 14
- Location: Grant Field
  Atlanta, GA

Tech defeated the Alabama Crimson Tide 33–7. Alabama's score came when Country Oliver returned a kickoff 95 yards.

The starting lineup was J. Staton (left end), Cornell (left tackle), McIntyre (left guard), Frye (center), Davis (right guard), A. Staton (right tackle), Mitchell (right end), McDonough (quarterback), Barron (left halfback), McWhorter (right halfback), Hunt (fullback).

=== Navy ===
Red Barron played well in the 13–0 loss to the Navy Midshipmen.

The starting lineup was J. Staton (left end), Connell (left tackle), McIntyre (left guard), Frye (center), Davis (right guard), A. Staton (right tackle), Mitchell (right end), McDonough (quarterback), Barron (left halfback), McWhorter (right halfback), Hunt (fullback).

=== Notre Dame ===
Tech played Knute Rockne's Notre Dame Fighting Irish for the first time. The Four Horsemen were sophomores playing their first year on the varsity, and beat Tech 13–3. The Irish stopped Red Barron.

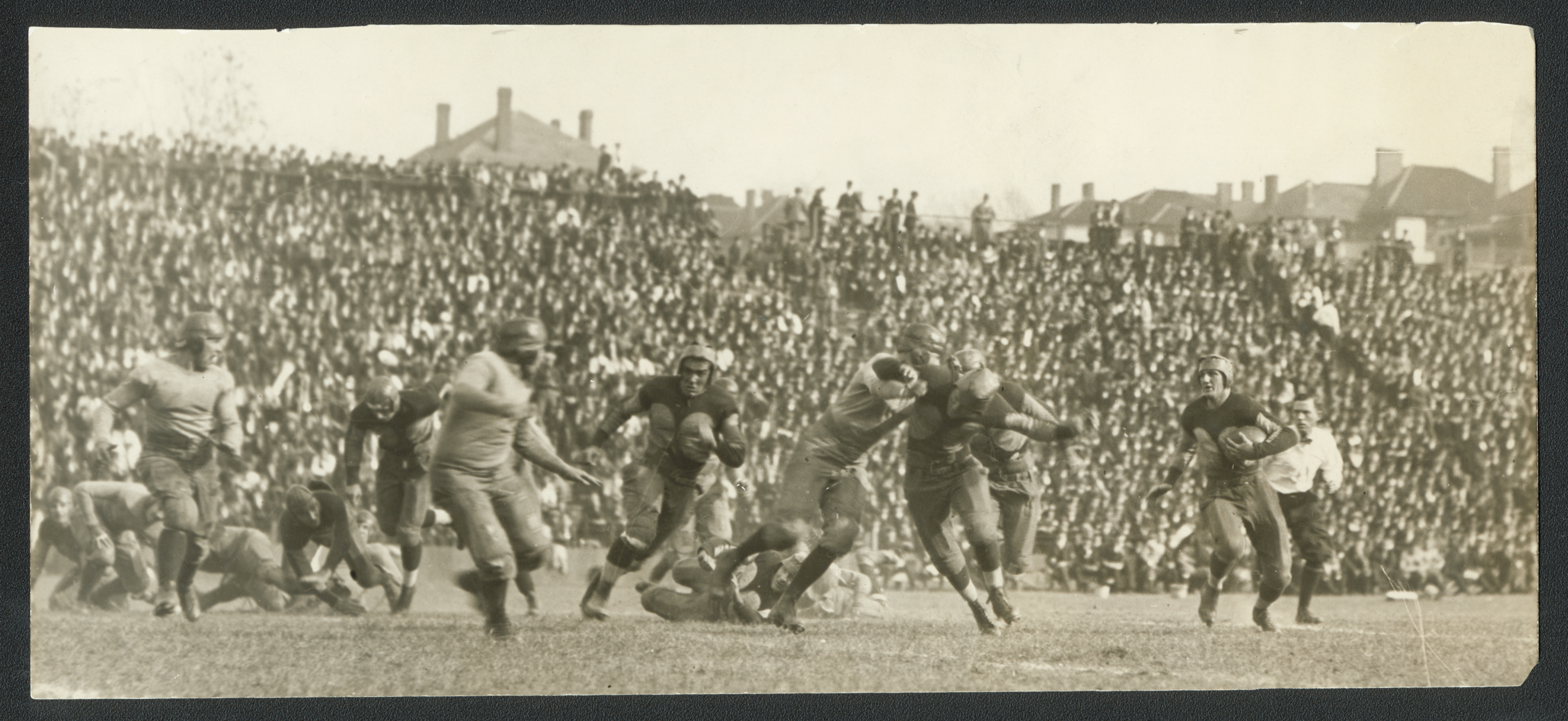
McDonough running interference for Brewster

The starting lineup was J. Staton (left end), Usry (left tackle), McConnel (left guard), Frye (center), Davis (right guard), Lyman (right tackle), A. Staton (right end), McDonough (quarterback), Barron (left halfback), Brewster (right halfback), Hunt (fullback)

=== Clemson ===
The Clemson Tigers were defeated 21–7. Coach Alexander used a different platoon each quarter.

The starting lineup was J. Staton (left end), Usery (left tackle), McConell (left guard), Frye (center), Davis (right guard), Lyman (right tackle), A. Staton (right end), McDonough (quarterback), Barron (left halfback), Brewster (right halfback), Hunt (fullback).

=== Georgetown ===
Georgetown at Georgia Tech

| Team | 1 | 2 | 3 | 4 | Total |
|---|---|---|---|---|---|
| Georgetown | 0 | 0 | 6 | 0 | 6 |
| • Ga. Tech | 6 | 6 | 7 | 0 | 19 |

- Date: November 11
- Location: Grant Field
  Atlanta, GA
- Referee: Echols (W and J)

Tech's backfield starred in a 19–7 defeat of the Georgetown Blue and Gray. Jack McDonough scored two touchdowns and Brewster another. Flavin scored for Georgetown.

The starting lineup was J. Staton (left end), Usry (left tackle), McIntyre (left guard), Frye (center), Davis (right guard), A. Staton (right tackle), Mitchell (right end), McDonough (quarterback), Barron (left halfback), Brewster (right halfback), Hunt (fullback).

=== NC State ===
NC State at Georgia Tech

| Team | 1 | 2 | 3 | 4 | Total |
|---|---|---|---|---|---|
| NCST | 0 | 0 | 0 | 0 | 0 |
| • Ga. Tech | 7 | 7 | 0 | 3 | 17 |

- Date: November 18
- Location: Grant Field
  Atlanta, GA

The Tornado shutout the NC State Wolfpack 17–0. Henry Reeves made a 40-yard drop kick.

The starting lineup was Gardner (left end), Johnson (left tackle), McConnell (left guard), Fleetwood (center), Borum (right guard), Lyman (right tackle), Mitchell (right end), McDonough (quarterback), Barron (left halfback), Brewster (right halfback), Hunt (fullback)

=== Auburn ===
Auburn at Georgia Tech

| Team | 1 | 2 | 3 | 4 | Total |
|---|---|---|---|---|---|
| Auburn | 0 | 0 | 0 | 6 | 6 |
| • Ga. Tech | 0 | 7 | 7 | 0 | 14 |

- Date: November 30
- Location: Grant Field
  Atlanta, GA
- Referee: Ed Finlay

Tech beat coach Mike Donahue's rival Auburn Tigers to secure a share of the SoCon championship. The 1922 team is considered one of Auburn's greatest football teams, and they had lost only to undefeated Army. Still Tech held the Tigers without a first down in the second and third periods. Ed Sherling scored Auburn's touchdown on a 16-yard rush.

The starting lineup was J. Staton (left end), Usry (left tackle), McIntyre (left guard), Frye (center), Davis (right guard), Lyman (right tackle), A. Staton (right end), McDonough (quarterback), Barron (left halfback), Brewster (right halfback), Hunt (fullback).

== Postseason ==
Red Barron and Vanderbilt's Lynn Bomar were the only unanimous All-Southern selections.

== Personnel ==
=== Depth chart ===
The following chart provides a visual depiction of Tech's lineup during the 1922 season with games started at the position reflected in parentheses. The chart mimics the offense after the jump shift has taken place.

LE
John Staton (8)
Gardner (1)

| LT | LG | C | RG | RT |
|---|---|---|---|---|
| Usry (4) | John McIntyre (6) | Claire Frye (8) | Oscar Davis (8) | W. P. Lyman (6) |
| Johnson (3) | McConnell (3) | Fleetwood (1) | Borum (1) | Albert Staton (3) |
| Connell (2) | | | | |

RE
Albert Staton (7)
Mitchell (2)

QB
Jack McDonough (9)

RHB
Jimmy Brewster (6)
McWhorter (2)
Rather (1)

FB
Pinkey Hunt (9)

LHB
Red Barron (9)
