= 1922 Auburn Tigers football team =

American college football season

1922 Auburn Tigers football
- Conference: Southern Conference
- Record: 8–2 (2–1 SoCon)
- Head coach: Mike Donahue (18th season)
- Base defense: 7–2–2
- Captain: John Shirey
- Home stadium: Drake Field; Rickwood Field; Cramton Bowl

1922 Southern Conference football standings
	Conf.					Overall
Team	W		L		T	W		L		T
North Carolina +	5	–	0	–	0	9	–	1	–	0
Georgia Tech +	4	–	0	–	0	7	–	2	–	0
Vanderbilt * +	3	–	0	–	0	8	–	0	–	1
VPI	3	–	0	–	0	8	–	1	–	1
Florida	2	–	0	–	0	7	–	2	–	0
Auburn	2	–	1	–	0	8	–	2	–	0
Tennessee	3	–	2	–	0	8	–	2	–	0
Alabama	3	–	2	–	1	6	–	3	–	1
Virginia	1	–	1	–	1	4	–	4	–	1
Mississippi A&M	2	–	3	–	0	3	–	4	–	2
Kentucky	1	–	2	–	0	6	–	3	–	0
Clemson	1	–	2	–	0	5	–	4	–	0
Washington and Lee	1	–	2	–	0	5	–	3	–	1
Maryland	1	–	2	–	0	4	–	5	–	1
LSU	1	–	2	–	0	3	–	7	–	0
Georgia	1	–	3	–	1	5	–	4	–	1
Tulane	1	–	4	–	0	4	–	4	–	0
South Carolina	0	–	2	–	0	5	–	4	–	0
Ole Miss	0	–	2	–	0	4	–	5	–	1
NC State	0	–	5	–	0	4	–	6	–	0
+ – Conference co-champions; * – co-member of SIAA

The 1922 Auburn Tigers football team represented Auburn University in the 1922 college football season. It was the Tigers' 31st overall and they competed as a member of the Southern Conference (SoCon). The team was led by head coach Mike Donahue, in his 18th year, and played their home games at Drake Field in Auburn, Alabama. They finished with a record of eight wins and two losses (8–2 overall, 2–1 in the SoCon). It was considered one of best teams Auburn turned out in the first half of the 20th century.

== Schedule ==
Date	Opponent	Site	Result	Attendance	Source
September 23	Marion*	Drake Field; Auburn, AL	W 61–0		
September 30	at Howard (AL)*	Rickwood Field; Birmingham, AL	W 72–0		
October 7	Spring Hill*	Cramton Bowl; Montgomery, AL	W 19–6		
October 14	at Army*	The Plain; West Point, NY	L 6–19		
October 21	Mercer*	Drake Field; Auburn, AL	W 50–6		
October 28	Fort Benning*	Drake Field; Auburn, AL	W 30–0		
November 4	vs. Georgia	Memorial Stadium; Columbus, GA (rivalry)	W 7–3		
November 11	Tulane	Cramton Bowl; Montgomery, AL (rivalry)	W 19–0	8,000	
November 18	Centre*	Rickwood Field; Birmingham, AL	W 6–0		
November 30	at Georgia Tech	Grant Field; Atlanta, GA (rivalry)	L 6–14	26,000	
*Non-conference game
