= 1922 Mississippi A&M Aggies football team =

American college football season

1922 Mississippi A&M Aggies football
- Conference: Southern Conference
- Record: 3–4–2 (2–3 SoCon)
- Head coach: Dudy Noble (1st season)
- Home stadium: Scott Field

1922 Southern Conference football standings
	Conf.					Overall
Team	W		L		T	W		L		T
North Carolina +	5	–	0	–	0	9	–	1	–	0
Georgia Tech +	4	–	0	–	0	7	–	2	–	0
Vanderbilt * +	3	–	0	–	0	8	–	0	–	1
VPI	3	–	0	–	0	8	–	1	–	1
Florida	2	–	0	–	0	7	–	2	–	0
Auburn	2	–	1	–	0	8	–	2	–	0
Tennessee	3	–	2	–	0	8	–	2	–	0
Alabama	3	–	2	–	1	6	–	3	–	1
Virginia	1	–	1	–	1	4	–	4	–	1
Mississippi A&M	2	–	3	–	0	3	–	4	–	2
Kentucky	1	–	2	–	0	6	–	3	–	0
Clemson	1	–	2	–	0	5	–	4	–	0
Washington and Lee	1	–	2	–	0	5	–	3	–	1
Maryland	1	–	2	–	0	4	–	5	–	1
LSU	1	–	2	–	0	3	–	7	–	0
Georgia	1	–	3	–	1	5	–	4	–	1
Tulane	1	–	4	–	0	4	–	4	–	0
South Carolina	0	–	2	–	0	5	–	4	–	0
Ole Miss	0	–	2	–	0	4	–	5	–	1
NC State	0	–	5	–	0	4	–	6	–	0
+ – Conference co-champions; * – co-member of SIAA

The 1922 Mississippi A&M Aggies football team was an American football team that represented the Agricultural and Mechanical College of the State of Mississippi (now known as Mississippi State University) as a member of the Southern Conference (SoCon) during the 1922 college football season. In their first season under head coach Dudy Noble, Mississippi A&M compiled a 3–4–2 record.

== Schedule ==
Date	Opponent	Site	Result	Attendance	Source
October 7	Birmingham–Southern*	Scott Field; Starkville, MS	W 14–0		
October 14	Howard (AL)*	Scott Field; Starkville, MS	T 0–0		
October 21	vs. Ole Miss	Fairgrounds; Jackson, MS (rivalry)	W 19–13	12,000–15,000	
October 28	at Tulane	Tulane Stadium; New Orlans, LA	L 0–26	5,000	
November 4	Ouachita Baptist*	Scott Field; Starkville, MS	T 7–7		
November 11	vs. Tennessee	Russwood Park; Memphis, TN	L 3–31	10,000	
November 18	at LSU	State Field; Baton Rouge, LA (rivalry)	W 7–0		
November 25	Drake*	Scott Field; Starkville, MS	L 6–48	15,000	
November 30	at Alabama	Denny Field; Tuscaloosa, AL (rivalry)	L 0–59		
*Non-conference game
