= 1922 LSU Tigers football team =

American college football season

1922 LSU Tigers football
- Conference: Southern Conference
- Record: 3–7 (1–2 SoCon)
- Head coach: Irving Pray (3rd season)
- Captain: E. L. "Tubby" Ewen
- Home stadium: State Field

1922 Southern Conference football standings
	Conf.					Overall
Team	W		L		T	W		L		T
North Carolina +	5	–	0	–	0	9	–	1	–	0
Georgia Tech +	4	–	0	–	0	7	–	2	–	0
Vanderbilt * +	3	–	0	–	0	8	–	0	–	1
VPI	3	–	0	–	0	8	–	1	–	1
Florida	2	–	0	–	0	7	–	2	–	0
Auburn	2	–	1	–	0	8	–	2	–	0
Tennessee	3	–	2	–	0	8	–	2	–	0
Alabama	3	–	2	–	1	6	–	3	–	1
Virginia	1	–	1	–	1	4	–	4	–	1
Mississippi A&M	2	–	3	–	0	3	–	4	–	2
Kentucky	1	–	2	–	0	6	–	3	–	0
Clemson	1	–	2	–	0	5	–	4	–	0
Washington and Lee	1	–	2	–	0	5	–	3	–	1
Maryland	1	–	2	–	0	4	–	5	–	1
LSU	1	–	2	–	0	3	–	7	–	0
Georgia	1	–	3	–	1	5	–	4	–	1
Tulane	1	–	4	–	0	4	–	4	–	0
South Carolina	0	–	2	–	0	5	–	4	–	0
Ole Miss	0	–	2	–	0	4	–	5	–	1
NC State	0	–	5	–	0	4	–	6	–	0
+ – Conference co-champions; * – co-member of SIAA

The 1922 LSU Tigers football team represented Louisiana State University (LSU) as a member of the Southern Conference (SoCon) during the 1922 college football season. Led by Irving Pray, who returned for his third and final season as head coach after having helmed the team for part of the 1916 season and the entire 1919 season, the Tigers compiled an overall record of 3–7 with a mark of 1–2 in conference play, placing in a five-way tie for 11th in the SoCon.

== Schedule ==
Date	Opponent	Site	Result	Attendance	Source
September 30	Louisiana Normal*	State Field; Baton Rouge, LA	W 13–0	3,000	
October 7	Loyola (LA)*	State Field; Baton Rouge, LA	L 0–7	4,500	
October 14	at SMU*	Fair Park Stadium; Dallas, TX	L 0–51	7,000	
October 20	at Texas A&M*	Kyle Field; College Station, TX (rivalry)	L 0–47		
October 28	vs. Arkansas*	Fair Grounds; Shreveport, LA (rivalry)	L 6–40		
November 2	Spring Hill*	State Field; Baton Rouge, LA	W 25–7	3,000	
November 7	vs. Rutgers*	Polo Grounds; New York, NY	L 0–25		
November 10	Alabama	Denny Field; Tuscaloosa, AL (rivalry)	L 3–47	7,500	
November 18	Mississippi A&M	State Field; Baton Rouge, LA (rivalry)	L 0–7		
November 30	Tulane^{†}	State Field; Baton Rouge, LA (Battle for the Rag)	W 25–14	9,500	
*Non-conference game; ^{†}Homecoming
