= 1922 Washington and Lee Generals football team =

American college football season

1922 Washington and Lee Generals football
- Conference: Southern Conference
- Record: 5–3–1 (1–2 SoCon)
- Head coach: Jimmy DeHart (1st season)
- Captain: Marv Mattox
- Home stadium: Wilson Field

1922 Southern Conference football standings
	Conf.					Overall
Team	W		L		T	W		L		T
North Carolina +	5	–	0	–	0	9	–	1	–	0
Georgia Tech +	4	–	0	–	0	7	–	2	–	0
Vanderbilt * +	3	–	0	–	0	8	–	0	–	1
VPI	3	–	0	–	0	8	–	1	–	1
Florida	2	–	0	–	0	7	–	2	–	0
Auburn	2	–	1	–	0	8	–	2	–	0
Tennessee	3	–	2	–	0	8	–	2	–	0
Alabama	3	–	2	–	1	6	–	3	–	1
Virginia	1	–	1	–	1	4	–	4	–	1
Mississippi A&M	2	–	3	–	0	3	–	4	–	2
Kentucky	1	–	2	–	0	6	–	3	–	0
Clemson	1	–	2	–	0	5	–	4	–	0
Washington and Lee	1	–	2	–	0	5	–	3	–	1
Maryland	1	–	2	–	0	4	–	5	–	1
LSU	1	–	2	–	0	3	–	7	–	0
Georgia	1	–	3	–	1	5	–	4	–	1
Tulane	1	–	4	–	0	4	–	4	–	0
South Carolina	0	–	2	–	0	5	–	4	–	0
Ole Miss	0	–	2	–	0	4	–	5	–	1
NC State	0	–	5	–	0	4	–	6	–	0
+ – Conference co-champions; * – co-member of SIAA

The 1922 Washington and Lee Generals football team represented Washington and Lee University during the 1922 college football season. The Generals competed in the Southern Conference (SoCon), were coached by Jimmy DeHart in his second year as head coach, and compiled a 5–3–1 record overall with a 1–2 mark in SoCon play.

== Schedule ==
Date	Opponent	Site	Result	Attendance	Source
September 30	Emory and Henry*	Wilson Field; Lexington, VA	W 85–0		
October 7	NC State	Wilson Field; Lexington, VA	W 14–0		
October 14	Carson–Newman*	Wilson Field; Lexington, VA	W 13–7		
October 21	vs. West Virginia*	Laidley Field; Charleston, WV	T 12–12	7,500	
October 28	Lynchburg*	Wilson Field; Lexington, VA	W 53–0		
November 4	at Virginia	Lambeth Field; Charlottesville, VA	L 6–22	8,000–10,000	
November 11	vs. Centre*	Eclipse Park; Louisville, KY	L 6–27		
November 18	vs. VPI	Fair Grounds; Lynchburg, VA	L 6–41		
November 30	at Johns Hopkins*	Homewood Field; Baltimore, MD	W 14–0		
*Non-conference game
