= 1922 Ole Miss Rebels football team =

American college football season

1922 Ole Miss Rebels football
- Conference: Southern Conference
- Record: 4–5–1 (0–2 SoCon)
- Head coach: Roland Cowell (1st season)
- Home stadium: Hemingway Stadium

1922 Southern Conference football standings
	Conf.					Overall
Team	W		L		T	W		L		T
North Carolina +	5	–	0	–	0	9	–	1	–	0
Georgia Tech +	4	–	0	–	0	7	–	2	–	0
Vanderbilt * +	3	–	0	–	0	8	–	0	–	1
VPI	3	–	0	–	0	8	–	1	–	1
Florida	2	–	0	–	0	7	–	2	–	0
Auburn	2	–	1	–	0	8	–	2	–	0
Tennessee	3	–	2	–	0	8	–	2	–	0
Alabama	3	–	2	–	1	6	–	3	–	1
Virginia	1	–	1	–	1	4	–	4	–	1
Mississippi A&M	2	–	3	–	0	3	–	4	–	2
Kentucky	1	–	2	–	0	6	–	3	–	0
Clemson	1	–	2	–	0	5	–	4	–	0
Washington and Lee	1	–	2	–	0	5	–	3	–	1
Maryland	1	–	2	–	0	4	–	5	–	1
LSU	1	–	2	–	0	3	–	7	–	0
Georgia	1	–	3	–	1	5	–	4	–	1
Tulane	1	–	4	–	0	4	–	4	–	0
South Carolina	0	–	2	–	0	5	–	4	–	0
Ole Miss	0	–	2	–	0	4	–	5	–	1
NC State	0	–	5	–	0	4	–	6	–	0
+ – Conference co-champions; * – co-member of SIAA

The 1922 Ole Miss Rebels football team was an American football team that represented the University of Mississippi (Ole Miss) in the Southern Conference during the 1922 college football season. In their first season under head coach Roland Cowell, the Rebels compiled a 4–5–1 record (0–2 against conference opponents).

== Schedule ==
Date	Opponent	Site	Result	Attendance	Source
September 30	Union (TN)*	Hemingway Stadium; Oxford, MS	T 0–0		
October 7	at Centre*	Cheek Field; Danville, KY	L 0–55		
October 14	Southwestern Presbyterian*	Hemingway Stadium; Oxford, MS	W 23–0		
October 21	vs. Mississippi A&M	State Fairgrounds; Jackson, MS	L 13–19	12,000–15,000	
October 28	at Tennessee	Shields–Watkins Field; Knoxville, TN	L 0–49		
November 4	Birmingham–Southern*	Hemingway Stadium; Oxford, MS	W 6–0		
November 11	Hendrix*	Hemingway Stadium; Oxford, MS	W 13–7		
November 18	at Tennessee Docs*	Russwood Park; Memphis, TN	L 0–32		
November 25	at Fort Benning*	Driving Park Stadium; Columbus, GA	L 13–14		
November 30	at Millsaps*	Capital Park; Jackson, MS	W 19–7		
*Non-conference game
