= 1922 Virginia Orange and Blue football team =

American college football season

1922 Virginia Orange and Blue football
- Conference: Southern Conference
- Record: 4–4–1 (1–1–1 SoCon)
- Head coach: Thomas J. Campbell (1st season)
- Home stadium: Lambeth Field

1922 Southern Conference football standings
	Conf.					Overall
Team	W		L		T	W		L		T
North Carolina +	5	–	0	–	0	9	–	1	–	0
Georgia Tech +	4	–	0	–	0	7	–	2	–	0
Vanderbilt * +	3	–	0	–	0	8	–	0	–	1
VPI	3	–	0	–	0	8	–	1	–	1
Florida	2	–	0	–	0	7	–	2	–	0
Auburn	2	–	1	–	0	8	–	2	–	0
Tennessee	3	–	2	–	0	8	–	2	–	0
Alabama	3	–	2	–	1	6	–	3	–	1
Virginia	1	–	1	–	1	4	–	4	–	1
Mississippi A&M	2	–	3	–	0	3	–	4	–	2
Kentucky	1	–	2	–	0	6	–	3	–	0
Clemson	1	–	2	–	0	5	–	4	–	0
Washington and Lee	1	–	2	–	0	5	–	3	–	1
Maryland	1	–	2	–	0	4	–	5	–	1
LSU	1	–	2	–	0	3	–	7	–	0
Georgia	1	–	3	–	1	5	–	4	–	1
Tulane	1	–	4	–	0	4	–	4	–	0
South Carolina	0	–	2	–	0	5	–	4	–	0
Ole Miss	0	–	2	–	0	4	–	5	–	1
NC State	0	–	5	–	0	4	–	6	–	0
+ – Conference co-champions; * – co-member of SIAA

The 1922 Virginia Orange and Blue football team represented the University of Virginia as a member of the Southern Conference (SoCon) during the 1922 college football season. Led by Thomas J. Campbell in his first and only season as head coach, the Orange and Blue compiled an overall record of 4–4–1 with a mark of 1–1–1 in conference play, placing ninth in the SoCon.

== Schedule ==
Date	Opponent	Site	Result	Attendance	Source
September 30	George Washington*	Lambeth Field; Charlottesville, VA	W 34–0		
October 7	at Princeton*	Palmer Stadium; Princeton, NJ	L 0–5		
October 14	Richmond*	Lambeth Field; Charlottesville, VA	W 14–6		
October 21	VMI*	Lambeth Field; Charlottesville, VA	L 0–14	11,000	
October 28	at Johns Hopkins*	Homewood Field; Baltimore, MD	W 19–0		
November 4	Washington and Lee	Lambeth Field; Charlottesville, VA	W 22–6	8,000–10,000	
November 11	Georgia	Lambeth Field; Charlottesville, VA	T 6–6		
November 18	West Virginia*	WVU Athletic Field; Morgantown, WV	L 0–13	6,000	
November 30	North Carolina	Lambeth Field; Charlottesville, VA (rivalry)	L 7–10		
*Non-conference game
