= 1922 Tulane Green Wave football team =

American college football season

1922 Tulane Green Wave football
- Conference: Southern Conference
- Record: 4–4 (1–4 SoCon)
- Head coach: Clark Shaughnessy (7th season)
- Offensive scheme: Single wing
- Captain: Paul Maloney
- Home stadium: Second Tulane Stadium

1922 Southern Conference football standings
	Conf.					Overall
Team	W		L		T	W		L		T
North Carolina +	5	–	0	–	0	9	–	1	–	0
Georgia Tech +	4	–	0	–	0	7	–	2	–	0
Vanderbilt * +	3	–	0	–	0	8	–	0	–	1
VPI	3	–	0	–	0	8	–	1	–	1
Florida	2	–	0	–	0	7	–	2	–	0
Auburn	2	–	1	–	0	8	–	2	–	0
Tennessee	3	–	2	–	0	8	–	2	–	0
Alabama	3	–	2	–	1	6	–	3	–	1
Virginia	1	–	1	–	1	4	–	4	–	1
Mississippi A&M	2	–	3	–	0	3	–	4	–	2
Kentucky	1	–	2	–	0	6	–	3	–	0
Clemson	1	–	2	–	0	5	–	4	–	0
Washington and Lee	1	–	2	–	0	5	–	3	–	1
Maryland	1	–	2	–	0	4	–	5	–	1
LSU	1	–	2	–	0	3	–	7	–	0
Georgia	1	–	3	–	1	5	–	4	–	1
Tulane	1	–	4	–	0	4	–	4	–	0
South Carolina	0	–	2	–	0	5	–	4	–	0
Ole Miss	0	–	2	–	0	4	–	5	–	1
NC State	0	–	5	–	0	4	–	6	–	0
+ – Conference co-champions; * – co-member of SIAA

The 1922 Tulane Green Wave football team was an American football team that represented Tulane University as a member of the Southern Conference (SoCon) during the 1922 college football season. In its seventh year under head coach Clark Shaughnessy, Tulane compiled a 4–4 record (1–4 in conference games), finished in 17th place in the SoCon, and outscored opponents by a total of 136 to 100.

== Schedule ==
Date	Opponent	Site	Result	Attendance	Source
October 7	Mississippi College*	Tulane Stadium; New Orleans, LA	W 30–0		
October 14	Spring Hill*	Tulane Stadium; New Orleans, LA	W 30–10		
October 21	Fort Benning Infantry School (GA)*	Tulane Stadium; New Orleans, LA	W 18–0		
October 28	Mississippi A&M	Tulane Stadium; New Orleans, LA	W 26–0	5,000	
November 4	North Carolina	Tulane Stadium; New Orleans, LA	L 12–19	10,000	
November 11	at Auburn	Cramton Bowl; Montgomery, AL (rivalry)	L 0–19	8,000	
November 18	Florida	Tulane Stadium; New Orleans, LA	L 6–27	6,000	
November 30	at LSU	State Field; Baton Rouge, LA (Battle for the Rag)	L 14–25	9,500	
*Non-conference game
