= 1922 NC State Wolfpack football team =

American college football season

1922 NC State Wolfpack football
- Conference: Southern Conference
- Record: 4–6 (0–5 SoCon)
- Head coach: Harry Hartsell (3rd season)
- Home stadium: Riddick Stadium

1922 Southern Conference football standings
	Conf.					Overall
Team	W		L		T	W		L		T
North Carolina +	5	–	0	–	0	9	–	1	–	0
Georgia Tech +	4	–	0	–	0	7	–	2	–	0
Vanderbilt * +	3	–	0	–	0	8	–	0	–	1
VPI	3	–	0	–	0	8	–	1	–	1
Florida	2	–	0	–	0	7	–	2	–	0
Auburn	2	–	1	–	0	8	–	2	–	0
Tennessee	3	–	2	–	0	8	–	2	–	0
Alabama	3	–	2	–	1	6	–	3	–	1
Virginia	1	–	1	–	1	4	–	4	–	1
Mississippi A&M	2	–	3	–	0	3	–	4	–	2
Kentucky	1	–	2	–	0	6	–	3	–	0
Clemson	1	–	2	–	0	5	–	4	–	0
Washington and Lee	1	–	2	–	0	5	–	3	–	1
Maryland	1	–	2	–	0	4	–	5	–	1
LSU	1	–	2	–	0	3	–	7	–	0
Georgia	1	–	3	–	1	5	–	4	–	1
Tulane	1	–	4	–	0	4	–	4	–	0
South Carolina	0	–	2	–	0	5	–	4	–	0
Ole Miss	0	–	2	–	0	4	–	5	–	1
NC State	0	–	5	–	0	4	–	6	–	0
+ – Conference co-champions; * – co-member of SIAA

The 1922 North Carolina State Wolfpack football team was an American football team that represented the NC State Wolfpack of North Carolina State University during the 1922 college football season. In its third season under head coach Harry Hartsell, the team compiled a 4–6 record.

== Schedule ==
Date	Time	Opponent	Site	Result	Attendance	Source
September 30		Randolph–Macon*	Riddick Stadium; Raleigh, NC	W 20–2		
October 7		at Washington and Lee	Wilson Field; Lexington, VA	L 6–14		
October 14		Roanoke*	Riddick Stadium; Raleigh, NC	W 13–0		
October 19		North Carolina	Riddick Stadium; Raleigh, NC (rivalry)	L 9–14		
October 28		vs. VMI*	League Park; Norfolk, VA	L 0–14		
November 4		Davidson*	Riddick Stadium; Raleigh, NC	W 15–0		
November 11	2:30 p.m.	vs. VPI	League Park; Norfolk, VA	L 0–24	6,000	
November 18		at Georgia Tech	Grant Field; Atlanta, GA	L 0–17		
November 25		at Wake Forest*	Gore Field; Wake Forest, NC (rivalry)	W 32–0	2,500	
November 30		Maryland	Riddick Stadium; Raleigh, NC	L 6–7		
*Non-conference game; All times are in Eastern time
