= 1922 Maryland Aggies football team =

American college football season

1922 Maryland Aggies football
- Conference: Southern Conference
- Record: 4–5–1 (1–2 SoCon)
- Head coach: Curley Byrd (12th season)

1922 Southern Conference football standings
	Conf.					Overall
Team	W		L		T	W		L		T
North Carolina +	5	–	0	–	0	9	–	1	–	0
Georgia Tech +	4	–	0	–	0	7	–	2	–	0
Vanderbilt * +	3	–	0	–	0	8	–	0	–	1
VPI	3	–	0	–	0	8	–	1	–	1
Florida	2	–	0	–	0	7	–	2	–	0
Auburn	2	–	1	–	0	8	–	2	–	0
Tennessee	3	–	2	–	0	8	–	2	–	0
Alabama	3	–	2	–	1	6	–	3	–	1
Virginia	1	–	1	–	1	4	–	4	–	1
Mississippi A&M	2	–	3	–	0	3	–	4	–	2
Kentucky	1	–	2	–	0	6	–	3	–	0
Clemson	1	–	2	–	0	5	–	4	–	0
Washington and Lee	1	–	2	–	0	5	–	3	–	1
Maryland	1	–	2	–	0	4	–	5	–	1
LSU	1	–	2	–	0	3	–	7	–	0
Georgia	1	–	3	–	1	5	–	4	–	1
Tulane	1	–	4	–	0	4	–	4	–	0
South Carolina	0	–	2	–	0	5	–	4	–	0
Ole Miss	0	–	2	–	0	4	–	5	–	1
NC State	0	–	5	–	0	4	–	6	–	0
+ – Conference co-champions; * – co-member of SIAA

The 1922 Maryland Aggies football team was an American football team that represented the University of Maryland in the Southern Conference (SoCon) during the 1922 college football season. In their 12th season under head coach Curley Byrd, the Aggies compiled a 4–5–1 record (1–2 against SoCon opponents), finished in a five-way tie for 11th place in the conference, and were outscored by a total of 137 to 77.

== Schedule ==
Date	Opponent	Site	Result	Attendance	Source
September 30	vs. Third Army Corps*	Homewood Field; Baltimore, MD	W 7–0		
October 7	at Richmond*	Stadium Field; Richmond, VA	T 0–0		
October 14	at Penn*	Franklin Field; Philadelphia, PA	L 0–12		
October 21	at Princeton*	Palmer Stadium; Princeton, NJ	L 0–26		
October 28	at North Carolina	Emerson Field; Chapel Hill, NC	L 3–27	2,888	
November 4	at VPI	Miles Field; Blacksburg, VA	L 0–21		
November 11	at Yale*	Yale Bowl; New Haven, CT	L 3–45	10,000	
November 18	at Johns Hopkins*	Homewood Field; Baltimore, MD	W 3–0		
November 25	at Catholic University*	Wilson Stadium; Washington, DC	W 54–0	3,000	
November 30	at NC State	Riddick Stadium; Raleigh, NC	W 7–6		
*Non-conference game
