= 1922 Kentucky Wildcats football team =

American college football season

1922 Kentucky Wildcats football
- Conference: Southern Conference
- Record: 6–3 (1–2 SoCon)
- Head coach: William Juneau (3rd season)
- Captain: Birkett Pribble
- Home stadium: Stoll Field

1922 Southern Conference football standings
	Conf.					Overall
Team	W		L		T	W		L		T
North Carolina +	5	–	0	–	0	9	–	1	–	0
Georgia Tech +	4	–	0	–	0	7	–	2	–	0
Vanderbilt * +	3	–	0	–	0	8	–	0	–	1
VPI	3	–	0	–	0	8	–	1	–	1
Florida	2	–	0	–	0	7	–	2	–	0
Auburn	2	–	1	–	0	8	–	2	–	0
Tennessee	3	–	2	–	0	8	–	2	–	0
Alabama	3	–	2	–	1	6	–	3	–	1
Virginia	1	–	1	–	1	4	–	4	–	1
Mississippi A&M	2	–	3	–	0	3	–	4	–	2
Kentucky	1	–	2	–	0	6	–	3	–	0
Clemson	1	–	2	–	0	5	–	4	–	0
Washington and Lee	1	–	2	–	0	5	–	3	–	1
Maryland	1	–	2	–	0	4	–	5	–	1
LSU	1	–	2	–	0	3	–	7	–	0
Georgia	1	–	3	–	1	5	–	4	–	1
Tulane	1	–	4	–	0	4	–	4	–	0
South Carolina	0	–	2	–	0	5	–	4	–	0
Ole Miss	0	–	2	–	0	4	–	5	–	1
NC State	0	–	5	–	0	4	–	6	–	0
+ – Conference co-champions; * – co-member of SIAA

The 1922 Kentucky Wildcats football team represented the University of Kentucky as a member of the Southern Conference (SoCon) during the 1923 college football season. Led by William Juneau in his third and final season as head coach, the Wildcats compiled an overall record of 6–3 with a mark of 1–2 in conference play, tying for 11th place in the SoCon. The Wildcats' November 18 win over Alabama would be the school's last over the Crimson Tide until 1997.

== Schedule ==
Date	Opponent	Site	Result	Attendance	Source
September 30	Marshall*	Stoll Field; Lexington, KY	W 16–0		
October 7	Cincinnati*	Stoll Field; Lexington, KY	W 15–0		
October 14	Louisville*	Stoll Field; Lexington, KY (rivalry)	W 73–0		
October 21	at Georgetown (KY)*	Georgetown, KY	W 40–6		
October 28	Sewanee*	Stoll Field; Lexington, KY	W 7–0		
November 4	Centre*	Stoll Field; Lexington, KY (rivalry)	L 3–27		
November 11	at Vanderbilt	Dudley Field; Nashville, TN (rivalry)	L 0–9	12,000	
November 18	Alabama	Stoll Field; Lexington, KY	W 6–0		
November 30	at Tennessee	Shields–Watkins Field; Knoxville, TN (rivalry)	L 7–14		
*Non-conference game
