= 1922 Alabama Crimson Tide football team =

American college football season

1922 Alabama Crimson Tide football
- Conference: Southern Conference
- Record: 6–3–1 (3–2–1 SoCon)
- Head coach: Xen C. Scott (4th season)
- Captain: Ernest Cooper
- Home stadium: Denny Field; Rickwood Field; Cramton Bowl

1922 Southern Conference football standings
	Conf.					Overall
Team	W		L		T	W		L		T
North Carolina +	5	–	0	–	0	9	–	1	–	0
Georgia Tech +	4	–	0	–	0	7	–	2	–	0
Vanderbilt * +	3	–	0	–	0	8	–	0	–	1
VPI	3	–	0	–	0	8	–	1	–	1
Florida	2	–	0	–	0	7	–	2	–	0
Auburn	2	–	1	–	0	8	–	2	–	0
Tennessee	3	–	2	–	0	8	–	2	–	0
Alabama	3	–	2	–	1	6	–	3	–	1
Virginia	1	–	1	–	1	4	–	4	–	1
Mississippi A&M	2	–	3	–	0	3	–	4	–	2
Kentucky	1	–	2	–	0	6	–	3	–	0
Clemson	1	–	2	–	0	5	–	4	–	0
Washington and Lee	1	–	2	–	0	5	–	3	–	1
Maryland	1	–	2	–	0	4	–	5	–	1
LSU	1	–	2	–	0	3	–	7	–	0
Georgia	1	–	3	–	1	5	–	4	–	1
Tulane	1	–	4	–	0	4	–	4	–	0
South Carolina	0	–	2	–	0	5	–	4	–	0
Ole Miss	0	–	2	–	0	4	–	5	–	1
NC State	0	–	5	–	0	4	–	6	–	0
+ – Conference co-champions; * – co-member of SIAA

The 1922 Alabama Crimson Tide football team (variously "Alabama", "UA" or "Bama") represented the University of Alabama in the 1922 college football season. It was the Crimson Tide's 29th overall and first season as a member of the Southern Conference (SoCon). The team was led by head coach Xen C. Scott, in his fourth year, and played their home games at Denny Field in Tuscaloosa, Rickwood Field in Birmingham and the Cramton Bowl in Montgomery, Alabama. They finished the season with a record of six wins, three losses and one tie (6–3–1 overall, 3–2–1 in the SoCon).

Alabama opened the season with a 110–0 victory over the Marion, which still stands as the school record for largest margin of victory and as the Crimson Tide's only 100 point game. After a victory over Oglethorpe, Alabama went winless over their next three games with losses at both Georgia Tech and Texas and a tie against Sewanee at Rickwood Field. With a record of 2–2–1, Alabama entered an intersectional contest against undefeated Penn as a major underdog. Alabama managed to upset the Quakers 9–7 in a game The Plain Dealer called "intersectional history". The Crimson Tide then completed their season with a homecoming win over LSU, a loss at Kentucky, a win over Georgia in Alabama's first game at the Cramton Bowl and a win over Mississippi A&M to close the season.

== Schedule ==
Date	Opponent	Site	Result	Attendance	Source
September 30	Marion*	Denny Field; Tuscaloosa, AL	W 110–0		
October 7	Oglethorpe*	Denny Field; Tuscaloosa, AL	W 41–0	3,000	
October 14	at Georgia Tech	Grant Field; Atlanta, GA (rivalry)	L 7–33		
October 21	Sewanee	Rickwood Field; Birmingham, AL	T 7–7		
October 28	at Texas*	Clark Field; Austin, TX	L 10–19		
November 4	at Penn*	Franklin Field; Philadelphia, PA	W 9–7	25,000	
November 10	LSU^{†}	Denny Field; Tuscaloosa, AL (rivalry)	W 47–3	7,500	
November 18	at Kentucky	Stoll Field; Lexington, KY	L 0–6		
November 25	Georgia	Cramton Bowl; Montgomery, AL (rivalry)	W 10–6	10,000	
November 30	Mississippi A&M	Rickwood Field; Birmingham, AL (rivalry)	W 59–0		
*Non-conference game; ^{†}Homecoming

== Before the season ==
Scott coached the 1922 season while dying of oral cancer, and he spent the whole season suffering from the effects of his illness, losing weight, barely able to speak, coaching against the advice of a doctor who told him to quit immediately, and bedridden except when attending practices and games.

The 1922 season also marked the first for the Crimson Tide as a member of the SoCon, as Alabama was one of the twenty members of the Southern Intercollegiate Athletic Association that left the Association to form the SoCon following the 1921 season.

== Game summaries ==
=== Marion ===
Marion at Alabama

Team	1	2	3	4	Total
Marion	0	0	0	0	0
• Alabama	20	35	28	27	110

- Date: September 30
- Location: Denny Field
  Tuscaloosa, AL

To open the season, Alabama played the Marion Military Institute at Tuscaloosa, and defeated the Cadets 110–0 in what was the most lopsided victory in the history of the Crimson Tide football program. Against Marion, Alabama shutout the Cadets 55–0 at Tuscaloosa for their third consecutive win to open the season. Touchdowns were scored four times by Max Rosenfeld, twice by William C. Baty and once each by Al Clemens and Virgil Hawkins.

=== Oglethorpe ===
Oglethorpe at Alabama

Team	1	2	3	4	Total
Oglethorpe	0	0	0	0	0
• Alabama	7	7	13	14	41

- Date: October 7
- Location: Denny Field
  Tuscaloosa, AL
- Game attendance: 3,000

After their record setting victory over Marion to open the season, Alabama prepared for an Oglethorpe squad that nearly upset Georgia Tech in their opening game. In what was the first all-time meeting against the Petrels, Alabama won 41–0 before 3,000 fans at Tuscaloosa. In the game, Charles Bartlett starred for Alabama as he scored five of their six touchdowns in the victory. Bartlett scored touchdowns on a 26-yard run in the first, a 15-yard reception from Hulet Whitaker in the second, and on a pair of runs in the third and one in the fourth. Graham McClintock scored the final touchdown of the game with his short run in the fourth and made the score 41–0.

After the Oglethorpe game Scott tendered his resignation, effective at the end of the season.

=== Georgia Tech ===
Alabama at Georgia Tech

Team	1	2	3	4	Total
Alabama	0	7	0	0	7
• Ga. Tech	13	20	0	0	33

- Date: October 14
- Location: Grant Field
  Atlanta, GA

In what was their first road game of the season, Alabama was defeated by the Georgia Tech Golden Tornado 33–7 at Atlanta. All of the scoring in the game occurred in the first half and the Yellow Jackets took a 33–0 lead en route to the win. Georgia Tech scored on first quarter runs of six-yards by Jack McDonough and eight-yards by Red Barron; in the second quarter they scored on runs by Alexander Hunt and Barron. The Yellow Jackets then scored their final touchdown on a 20-yard McDonough pass to Hunt late in the second quarter. Alabama responded with their only points just prior to halftime when Country Oliver returned a McDonough kickoff 95-yards for a touchdown.

=== Sewanee ===
Sewanee at Alabama

Team	1	2	3	4	Total
Sewanee	0	0	7	0	7
Alabama	0	7	0	0	7

- Date: October 21
- Location: Rickwood Field
  Birmingham, AL

In the first Rickwood Field game of the season, Alabama tied the Sewanee Tigers 7–7 for their lone tie of the season. After a scoreless first quarter, the Crimson Tide took a 7–0 lead after Charles Bartlett threw a 60-yard touchdown pass to Allen MacCartee in the second. Sewanee responded in the third when Bill Coughlan intercepted a Bartlett pass and returned it 70-yards and tied the game 7–7. Although they outplayed the Tigers throughout the game, Alabama was unable to win due to their numerous turnovers made throughout the contest.

=== Texas ===
Alabama at Texas

Team	1	2	3	4	Total
Alabama	7	0	3	0	10
• Texas	13	3	3	0	19

- Date: October 28
- Location: Clark Field
  Austin, TX

In their second road game of the season, Alabama was defeated by the Texas Longhorns 19–10 at Clark Field in Austin. Alabama took an early 7–0 lead in the first two minutes of the game after Charles Bartlett threw a 25-yard touchdown pass to William Baty. Texas responded with a pair of touchdowns later in the quarter for a 13–7 lead. The first came on an Ivan Robertson pass to George Gardere and the second on a Yancy Culp run. A Robertson field goal in the second quarter extended the Longhorns lead to 16–7 at halftime.

After a 31-yard Robertson field goal in the third extended the Texas lead, Alabama scored the final points of the game on a short L. O. Wesley field goal later in the quarter and made the final score 19–10.

=== Penn ===
Alabama at Penn

Team	1	2	3	4	Total
• Alabama	0	3	6	0	9
Penn	0	7	0	0	7

- Date: November 4
- Location: Franklin Field
  Philadelphia, PA
- Game attendance: 25,000

Alabama entered their intersectional contest against undefeated Penn, coached by John Heisman, with noted sports columnist Grantland Rice having predicted a 21–0 Quaker victory. Although the entered as an underdog, The Philadelphia Inquirer noted the Crimson Tide as a veteran squad that had not reached their full potential and expected them to plat Penn tough. Before 25,000 fans at Franklin Field, Alabama upset the Quakers 9–7 in what was later recognized as one of the Crimson Tide's most significant victories in the history of the program.

After a scoreless first quarter, Alabama took a 3–0 lead after L. O. Wesley connected on a 34-yard field goal. G. H. Sullivan responded later in the quarter with his 35-yard touchdown run that gave the Quakers a 7–3 halftime lead. In the third quarter the Crimson Tide took the lead after Pooley Hubert fumbled on third and goal and teammate Clyde Propst recovered the ball for a touchdown. The extra point failed, but Alabama took a 9–7 lead. Twice in the fourth quarter Alabama missed field goals, leaving Penn with a chance to win late. The Quakers drove to the Alabama 30 in the final moments but on fourth down Alabama came up with a sack to clinch a 9–7 victory.

The starting lineup was: Newton (left end), Hovater (left tackle), Wesley (left guard), Probst (center), Compton (right guard), Cooper (right tackle), Clemens (right end), Bartlett (quarterback), Baty (left halfback), Oliver (right halfback), and Hubert (fullback).

=== LSU ===
LSU at Alabama

Team	1	2	3	4	Total
LSU	0	3	0	0	3
• Alabama	0	27	14	6	47

- Date: November 10
- Location: Denny Stadium
  Tuscaloosa, AL
- Game attendance: 7,500

On the Friday after their upset victory at Philadelphia, Alabama returned to Tuscaloosa and before the then largest crowd in the history of Denny Field on homecoming and defeated LSU 47–3. After a scoreless first quarter, Bartlett scored on a ten-yard run for a 7–0 Crimson Tide lead. Allen Graham MacCartee then extended their lead to 13–0 with his short touchdown run, and the Tigers responded with their lone points of the game on a 28-yard Roland Kizer drop kick. Alabama then extended their lead to 27–3 at halftime behind a five-yard Hulet Whitaker run and short Bartlett pass to Al Clemens.

Early in the third, a Graham McClintock fumble gave LSU possession deep in Crimson Tide territory. On the play that ensued, Pooley Hubert intercepted a Kizer pass and returned it 65 yards for a touchdown. A five-yard Bartlett touchdown run later in the quarter extended the Alabama lead to 41–3 as they entered the fourth. Playing almost exclusively reserves in the final period, Bartlett made the final score 47–3 with his five-yard touchdown run.

=== Kentucky ===
Alabama at Kentucky

Team	1	2	3	4	Total
Alabama	0	0	0	0	0
• Kentucky	0	0	6	0	6

- Date: November 18
- Location: Stoll Field
  Lexington, KY

In rain soaked conditions on a soggy field, Alabama was defeated 6–0 by Kentucky at Lexington. The Wildcats scored the only points of the game in the third quarter on a six-yard Bruce Fuller touchdown run.

=== Georgia ===
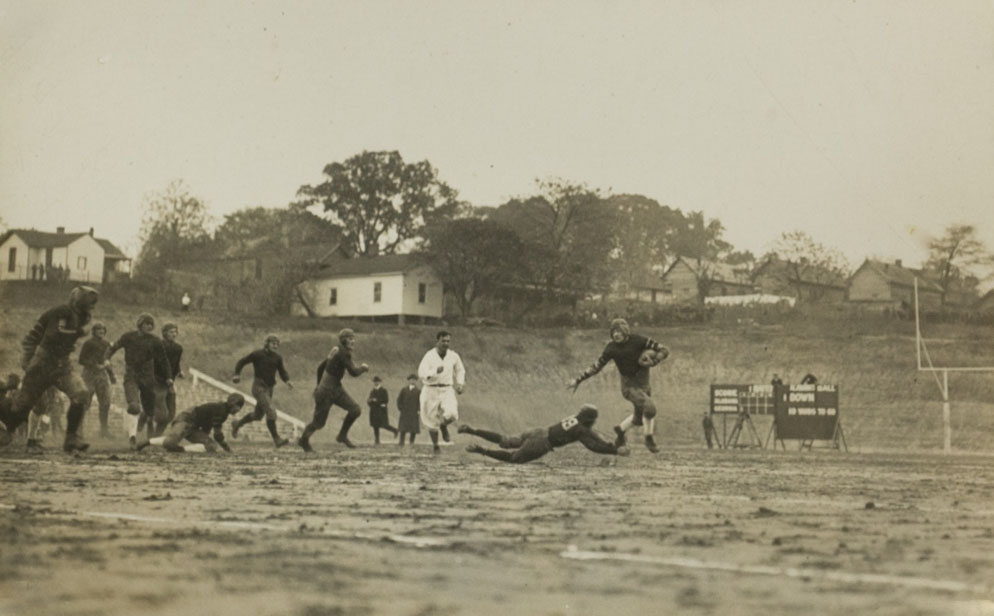
Charles Bartlett running around end against the Bulldogs.

Georgia at Alabama

Team	1	2	3	4	Total
Georgia	6	0	0	0	6
• Alabama	0	7	3	0	10

- Date: November 25
- Location: Cramton Bowl
  Montgomery, AL
- Game attendance: 10,000

Playing their first all-time game at the Cramton Bowl, the Crimson Tide overcame an early 6–0 deficit and defeated the Georgia Bulldogs 10–6. The Bulldogs scored first after John Fletcher recovered an Allen Graham MacCartee fumble and returned it 96-yards for a touchdown.

Alabama responded with a short Charles Bartlett touchdown run in the second and with a 20-yard Bartlett field goal in the third for the 10–6 win.

=== Mississippi A&M ===
Mississippi A&M at Alabama

Team	1	2	3	4	Total
Mississippi A&M	0	0	0	0	0
• Alabama	29	9	7	14	59

- Date: November 30
- Location: Rickwood Field
  Birmingham, AL

In their final game of the season, Alabama defeated the Mississippi A&M (now known as Mississippi State University) Aggies 59–0 at Rickwood Field. The Crimson Tide scored in all four quarters of the contest and touchdowns were scored by Charles Bartlett, Pooley Hubert, Hulet Whitaker, Allen Graham MacCartee, Al Clemens and Tom Newton.

== After the season ==
Scott died in April 1924 at age 41. The Tide hired Vanderbilt assistant Wallace Wade.

Alabama averaged the most points per game of any team in the SoCon. Bartlett was selected for the All-Southern team of Marvin McCarthy, sporting editor for the Birmingham Age-Herald, and given honorable mention on the All-America team of Walter Camp.

== Personnel ==
=== Varsity letter winners ===
==== Line ====
Player	Hometown	Position	Games started	Prep school	Height	Weight	Age
Al Clemens	Scottsboro, Alabama	End					24
Ernest Cooper	St. Stephens, Alabama	Tackle					
Elmer Wilbur Dany	Cleveland, Ohio	End					
Clayton H. Hudson	Montgomery, Alabama	End					
Ben Hunt	Scottsboro, Alabama	Guard					
William Milner Kelly	Birmingham, Alabama	End					
Jack Langhorne	Uniontown, Alabama	Tackle					
Graham McClintock	Laurel, Mississippi	End/Back					
Tom Newton	Birmingham, Alabama	End					
Clyde "Shorty" Propst	Ohatchee, Alabama	Center					
L. O. Wesley	Guin, Alabama	Guard					

==== Backfield ====
Player	Hometown	Position	Games started	Prep school	Height	Weight	Age
Charles Bartlett	Marlin, Texas	Halfback/Quarterback					
William C. Baty	Bessemer, Alabama	Halfback					
J. H. Emmett	Albertville, Alabama	Halfback					
Robert Poole Hinton	Uniontown, Alabama	Back					
Allison "Pooley" Hubert	Meridian, Mississippi	Fullback		Meridian High			21
Allen Graham MacCartee	Washington, D.C.	Halfback					
W. S. "Country" Oliver	Panola, Alabama	Back/Tackle					

==== Other ====
Name	Hometown	Position
Berney Perry		Manager

=== Coaching staff ===
Name	Position	Seasons at Alabama	Alma mater
Xen C. Scott	Head coach	4	
Hank Crisp	Assistant coach	2	VPI (1920)
William T. Van de Graaff	Assistant coach	2	Alabama (1916)
