= 1922 Florida Gators football team =

American college football season

1922 Florida Gators football
- Conference: Southern Conference
- Record: 7–2 (2–0 SoCon)
- Head coach: William G. Kline (3rd season)
- Offensive scheme: Multiple
- Captain: Ferdinand H. Duncan
- Home stadium: Fleming Field

Uniform
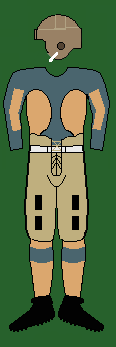

1922 Southern Conference football standings
	Conf.					Overall
Team	W		L		T	W		L		T
North Carolina +	5	–	0	–	0	9	–	1	–	0
Georgia Tech +	4	–	0	–	0	7	–	2	–	0
Vanderbilt * +	3	–	0	–	0	8	–	0	–	1
VPI	3	–	0	–	0	8	–	1	–	1
Florida	2	–	0	–	0	7	–	2	–	0
Auburn	2	–	1	–	0	8	–	2	–	0
Tennessee	3	–	2	–	0	8	–	2	–	0
Alabama	3	–	2	–	1	6	–	3	–	1
Virginia	1	–	1	–	1	4	–	4	–	1
Mississippi A&M	2	–	3	–	0	3	–	4	–	2
Kentucky	1	–	2	–	0	6	–	3	–	0
Clemson	1	–	2	–	0	5	–	4	–	0
Washington and Lee	1	–	2	–	0	5	–	3	–	1
Maryland	1	–	2	–	0	4	–	5	–	1
LSU	1	–	2	–	0	3	–	7	–	0
Georgia	1	–	3	–	1	5	–	4	–	1
Tulane	1	–	4	–	0	4	–	4	–	0
South Carolina	0	–	2	–	0	5	–	4	–	0
Ole Miss	0	–	2	–	0	4	–	5	–	1
NC State	0	–	5	–	0	4	–	6	–	0
+ – Conference co-champions; * – co-member of SIAA

The 1922 Florida Gators football team represented the Florida Gators of the University of Florida during the 1922 Southern Conference football season. The season was law professor William G. Kline's third and last year as the head coach of the Florida Gators football team. Kline's 1922 Florida Gators finished 7–2 overall, and 2–0 in their first year as members of the new Southern Conference, placing fifth of twenty-one teams in the conference standings.

Despite the undefeated conference record, the team played only two conference opponents (Tulane and Clemson) and so did not rank as co-champion with Vanderbilt, Georgia Tech, and North Carolina.

The 1922 Spalding's Football Guide ranked Florida as the best forward passing team in the country. The team had an unexpected loss early in the season to Furman in a close match, but otherwise the season is notable for visiting Washington D.C. and the White House upon traveling to the Northern United States for the first time to face Harvard, and the upset of Tulane.

== Before the season ==
In the first season of the new Southern Conference (SoCon), freshmen were barred from play.

1921 had been the best year in Florida football history. Florida had two of the South's best punters in running backs Ark Newton and Ray Dickson.

== Schedule ==
Date	Opponent	Site	Result	Attendance	Source
October 7	Furman*	Fleming Field; Gainesville, FL	L 6–7		
October 14	at Rollins*	Exposition Park; Orlando, FL	W 19–0		
October 21	vs. American Legion*	Plant Field; Tampa, FL	W 14–0		
October 28	Howard (AL)*	Fleming Field; Gainesville, FL	W 57–0		
November 4	at Harvard*	Harvard Stadium; Boston, MA	L 0–24	30,000	
November 11	vs. Mississippi College*	Plant Field; Tampa, FL	W 58–0	4,000	
November 18	at Tulane	Second Tulane Stadium; New Orleans, LA	W 27–6	6,000	
November 25	at Oglethorpe*	Ponce de Leon Park; Atlanta, GA	W 12–0		
December 2	vs. Clemson	Barrs Field; Jacksonville, FL	W 47–14		
*Non-conference game

== Game summaries ==
=== Week 1: Furman ===
Week 1: Furman at Florida

Team	1	2	3	4	Total
• Furman	7	0	0	0	7
Florida	0	6	0	0	6

- Date: October 7
- Location: Fleming Field
  Gainesville, FL
- Game weather: Rain
- Referee: Ted Arnold

The lone upset of the year happened in the opening game with a 7 to 6 loss to coach Billy Laval's Furman Purple Hurricane. A muddy and slippery field plagued the first half. Florida had two touchdowns called back and halfback Case once fell down with a clear field in front of him. The Gators' only score was made in a downpour.

Florida completed just two passes. Furman scored on its only completed pass, a long one of 60+ yards. Ark Newton once failing to kick goal proved to be the difference. As a result of this game, the coaches revised their tactics and strategy.

The starting lineup was: Coleman (left end), Robinson (left tackle), Norton (left guard), Gunn (center), Scott (right guard), Doty (right tackle), Duncan (right end), Barchan (quarterback), Pomeroy (left halfback), Newton (right halfback), Hockenstadt (fullback).

=== Week 2: Rollins ===
Again rain and a soggy field hampered play in the second week against the Rollins Tars in Orlando. Florida only rolled up 19 points with the new tactics. Dickson made two touchdowns and Newton one.

The starting lineup was: Coleman (left end), Robinson (left tackle), Norton (left guard), Gunn (center), Scott (right guard), Doty (right tackle), Duncan (right end), Barchan (quarterback), Pomeroy (left halfback), Newton (right halfback), Dickson (fullback).

=== Week 3: American Legion ===
Week 3: American Legion at Florida

Team	1	2	3	4	Total
Legion	0	0	0	0	0
• Florida	0	0	7	7	14

- Date: October 21
- Location: Tampa, FL

Facing many former college football stars, including Hall of Famer Buck Flowers, who netted a 74-yard punt during the contest, Florida defeated American Legion 14–0 in Tampa using much of the new style of play. Stewart Pomeroy scored both touchdowns and Ray Dickson made both extra points. The last touchdown from Pomeroy was "a beautiful run around right end."

=== Week 4: Howard ===
In the game against coach Harris Cope's Howard Bulldogs in Gainesville, Florida, seemed to find its stride within the coaches' new system, winning 57–0. Coleman broke his collarbone.

The starting lineup was: Coleman (left end), Robinson (left tackle), Byrd (left guard), Gunn (center), Scott (right guard), Doty (right tackle), Duncan (right end), Pomeroy (quarterback), Case (left halfback), Newton (right halfback), Dickson (fullback).

=== Week 5: at Harvard ===
Week 5: Florida at Harvard

Team	1	2	3	4	Total
Florida	0	0	0	0	0
• Harvard	14	3	0	7	24

- Date: November 4
- Location: Harvard Stadium
  Boston, MA
- Game attendance: 30,000
- Referee: W. R. Crowley (Bowdoin)

In the Gators' first ever game against a traditional northeastern college football power, they traveled north to meet coach Bob Fisher's Harvard Crimson. On their way north the Gators stopped in Washington, D.C., and were greeted by President Warren Harding.

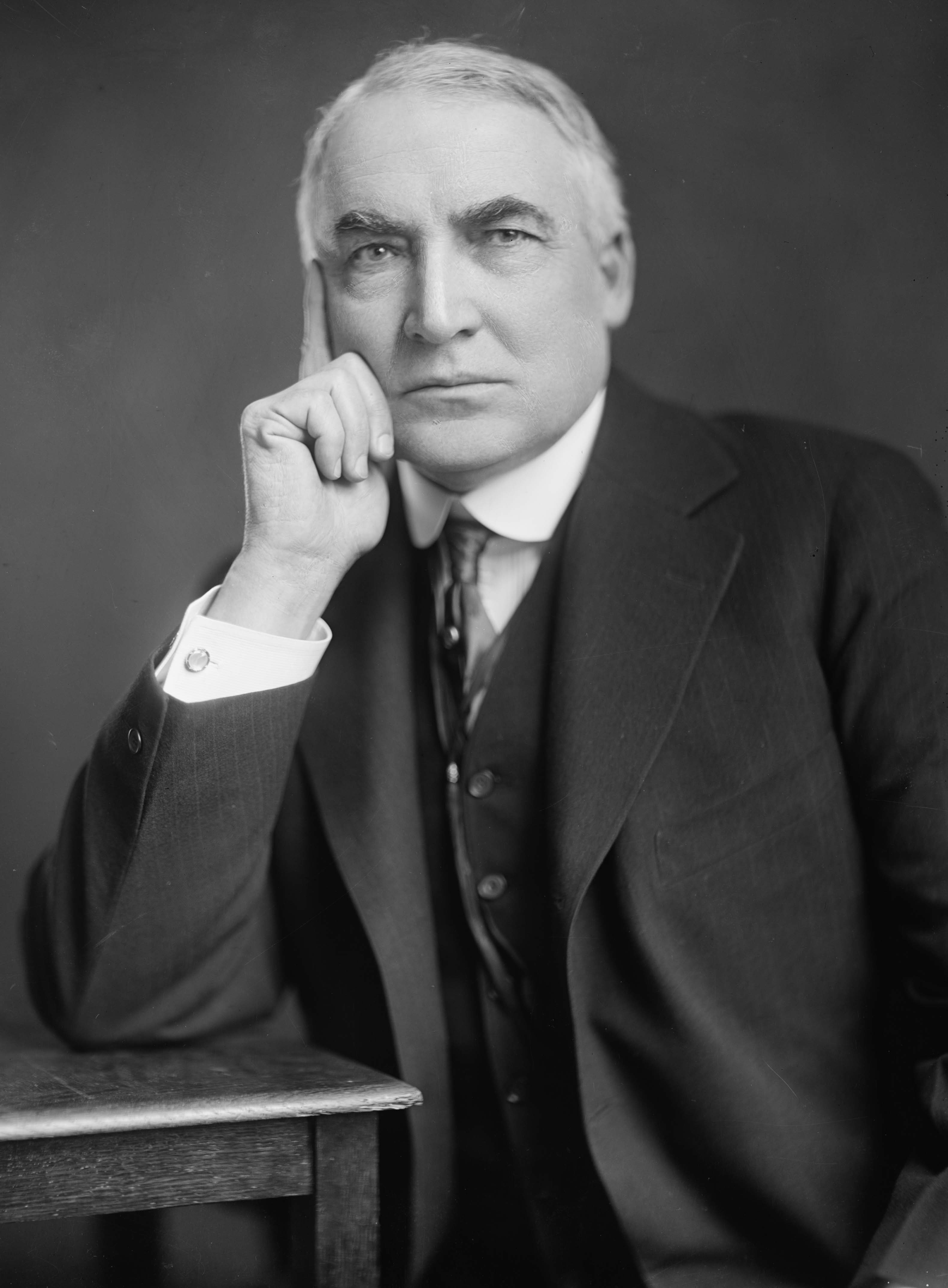
The Gator team met President Harding (pictured) prior to the Harvard game.

Harvard subs overwhelmed the Florida team 24 to 0 in front of the largest crowd yet to see the Gators play. One writer spoke of "the desperate rally of Florida's 'Gators against the overwhelming Harvard attack" which despite the loss "showed the 'Gators probably the best team the Gainesville institution has turned out." The stars for Florida that day included backs Ray Dickson and Ark Newton. On the line, Robbie Robinson, "who at times stood Harvard's backs on their heads," played well. "Robinson and Duncan stood out all afternoon."

The starting lineup was: Hockinstadt (left end), Robinson (left tackle), Byrd (left guard), Gunn (center), Scott (right guard), Doty (right tackle), Duncan (right end), Pomeroy (quarterback), Newton (left halfback), Case (right halfback), Dickson (fullback).

=== Week 6: Mississippi College ===
Week 6: Mississippi College at Florida

Team	1	2	3	4	Total
Mississippi	0	0	0	0	0
• Florida	0	13	13	32	58

- Date: November 11
- Location: Plant Field
  Tampa, FL
- Game attendance: 4,000

In Tampa on Plant Field, the Gators defeated coach Stanley L. Robinson's Mississippi College Choctaws 58 to 0. Florida played poorly in the first quarter. The highlight of the game was Ark Newton's run of 72 yards in the second quarter.

The starting lineup was: Mounts (left end), Robinson (left tackle), Byrd (left guard), Gunn (center), Scott (right guard), Doty (right tackle), Duncan (right end), Barchan (quarterback), Case (left halfback), Newton (right halfback), Dickson (fullback).

=== Week 7: at Tulane ===
Week 7: Florida at Tulane

Team	1	2	3	4	Total
• Florida	6	0	7	14	27
Tulane	0	6	0	0	6

- Date: November 18
- Location: Tulane Stadium
  New Orleans, LA
- Game attendance: 6,000
- Referee: Bonner (Auburn)

In the seventh week of play, Florida defeated coach Clark Shaughnessy's Tulane Green Wave in New Orleans 27 to 6 in an upset. Fullback Ray Dickson was all over the field tackling Tulane's players. He knocked Tulane center Eddie Reed out of the game on a hit which got an unnecessary roughness penalty.

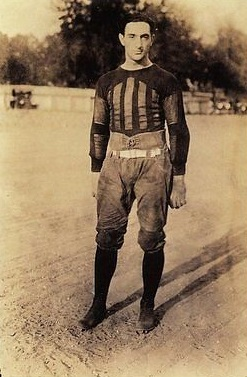
Ark Newton

After the first half ended in a 6–6 tie, the Gators opened up a passing attack in the second half "which could not be stopped." One sportswriter claimed Ark Newton threw 13 completions in a row. "Newton gave the greatest halfback exhibition this season in New Orleans."

The starting lineup was: Hockinstadt (left end), Robinson (left tackle), Byrd (left guard), Gunn (center), Scott (right guard), Doty (right tackle), Duncan (right end), Barchan (quarterback), Newton (left halfback), Case (right halfback), Dickson (fullback).

=== Week 8: at Oglethorpe ===
Week 8: Florida at Oglethorpe

Team	1	2	3	4	Total
• Florida	0	6	0	6	12
Oglethorpe	0	0	0	0	0

- Date: November 25
- Location: Poncey
  Atlanta, GA
- Referee: Lawson (Illinois)

Freezing weather and a stony field in Atlanta made for unexpected trouble against the Oglethorpe Stormy Petrels. Florida defeated the Petrels by just a 12 to 0 score. End Ferdinand H. Duncan scored all of Florida's points. "Albeit Duncan did the damage...most of the credit for the victory should go to Newton."

The starting lineup was: Hockinstad (left end), Robinson (left tackle), Byrd (left guard), Gunn (center), Scott (right guard), Doty (right tackle), Duncan (right end), Barchan (quarterback), Case (left halfback), Newton (right halfback), Dickson (fullback).

=== Week 9: Clemson ===
Week 9: Clemson at Florida

Team	1	2	3	4	Total
Clemson	0	7	7	0	14
• Florida	6	13	14	14	47

- Date: December 2
- Location: Barrs Field
  Jacksonville, FL
- Referee: Jogger Elcock

The Gators defeated the Clemson Tigers 47 to 14 using a repertoire of shifting tactics. They also used hard line plunges and forward passes. "Newton and Pomeroy provided the thrills from the Florida side." A description of the game reads "The whistle frequently found Ark Newton, Florida's star on his feet with four or five of the Carolinians clinging around him and the others smothered under the Florida poundage."

The starting lineup was: Mounts (left end), Robinson (left tackle), Byrd (left guard), Gunn (center), Scott (right guard), Doty (right tackle), Hockenstad (right end), Barchan (quarterback), Pomeroy (left halfback), Case (right halfback), Newton (fullback).

== Postseason ==
=== Awards and honors ===
The season trumped the accomplishments even of last year's team. Newton was selected for the All-Southern team of Ed Hebert of the Times-Picayune in 1922.

The 1922 freshman team was a Southern champion, coached by Florida native and former Yale All-American John Acosta. (Note: The team included Cy Williams, Goldy Goldstein, Edgar Jones, and Bill Middlekauff.)

=== Kline's departure ===
After the 1922–1923 school year, Kline resigned to pursue a legal career, and returned to the University of Nebraska, where he was the head coach of the Nebraska Cornhuskers men's basketball and baseball teams, and later became a published author of books on coaching football, basketball and baseball. He was replaced at Florida by assistant Van Fleet.

== Personnel ==
=== Line ===
Player	Position	Games started	Hometown	Prep school	Height	Weight	Age
Calhoun Byrd	guard	8					
Robert Carlton	center	0					
Arthur Doty	tackle	8			6'0"	198	
Ferdinand H. Duncan	end	7		University of South Dakota	6'2"	200	26
Eric Dunn	center	8	Kissimmee		6'6"	200	
George Hodges	guard	0					
Lloyd Hokenstad	end	4					
Mervin Mounts	end	2			5'9"	155	
Robbie Robinson	tackle	8	Mobile, Alabama		6'0"	180	20
Ivan Scott	guard	8			6'0"	180	

=== Backfield ===
Player	Position	Games started	Hometown	Prep school	Height	Weight	Age
Joseph Barchan	quarterback	6					
Osmond Bie	halfback	0					
Lawrence Case	halfback	6	St. Augustine				
Ray Dickson	fullback	6			6'0"	202	
Ark Newton	halfback	8	Camden, Arkansas	Camden High	6'1"	185	19
Stewart Pomeroy	halfback/quarterback	5	Tampa		5'6"	150	

=== Coaching staff ===
- Head coach: William G. Kline
- Assistant coach: James Van Fleet
- Freshman coach: John Acosta
- Manager: James R. Boyd
- Assistant manager: Frank Evans

== See also ==
- 1922 College Football All-Southern Team
- 1922 Southern Conference football season

== Bibliography ==
- Carlson, Norm (2007). University of Florida Football Vault: The History of the Florida Gators. Atlanta, Georgia: Whitman Publishing, LLC. ISBN 978-0-7948-2298-9.
- University of Florida (1923). The Seminole.
- Woodruff, Fuzzy (1928). A History of Southern Football 1890–1928. Vol. 3.
