= John Acosta =

American football player and coach (1898–1929)

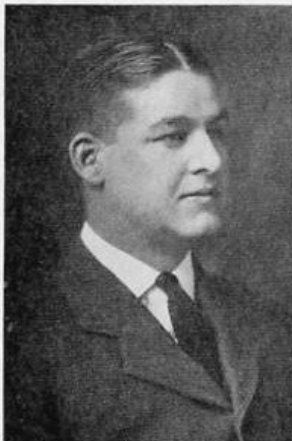

Biographical details
- Born: December 13, 1898; Jacksonville, Florida
- Died: July 18, 1929 (aged 30); Waverly, Georgia

Playing career
- 1919–1920: Yale
- Position: Guard

Coaching career (HC unless noted)
- 1922: Florida (freshmen)

Accomplishments and honors

Awards
- All-American (1920)

John Sidney Acosta (December 13, 1898 – July 18, 1929) was a college football player and coach from Jacksonville, Florida in the United States. He was a guard for the Yale Bulldogs, selected first-team All-American in 1920 by Walter Eckersall. Acosta was born by parents Tracy L. Acosta and Cora Acosta. He grew up in a democratic household with three siblings by the names of Tracy, James Bailey (who died at the age of three), and Katherine. He came to Yale from the Lawrenceville (New Jersey) School. He went out for football and track; was captain of the Freshman Football Team, and in 1919 and 1920 was on the University Football Team. In Freshman year he was on the Freshman Team, and in the Sophomore, Junior and Senior years belonged to the University Track Team. He was a member of the Sophomore German Committee, the Junior Promenade Committee and the Student Council. He belonged to the Lawrenceville School Club, the Southern Club, of which he was treasurer in 1920, the Sword and Gun Club, Delta Kappa Epsilon and Skull and Bones, being the only Florida born man who ever received that honor. Mr. Acosta joined the Yale R.O.T.C. in October 1917, and served with it at New Haven and Camp Jackson, South Carolina, until September 13, 1918, when he was commissioned second lieutenant of Field Artillery and assigned to the Thirty-ninth Training Battery at Camp Zachary Taylor, Kentucky. He remained with that unit until he received his discharge on December 4, 1918. After graduation he joined his father in the insurance business in Jacksonville, Florida. He then took up coaching. Acosta was the freshman coach for the Florida Gators in 1922, leading them to a southern title. He later died at age 30, in an automobile accident.
