= 1922 North Carolina Tar Heels football team =

American college football season

1922 North Carolina Tar Heels football

SoCon co-champion
- Conference: Southern Conference
- Record: 9–1 (5–0 SoCon)
- Head coach: Bob Fetzer & Bill Fetzer (2nd season)
- Captain: Grady Pritchard
- Home stadium: Emerson Field

1922 Southern Conference football standings
	Conf.					Overall
Team	W		L		T	W		L		T
North Carolina +	5	–	0	–	0	9	–	1	–	0
Georgia Tech +	4	–	0	–	0	7	–	2	–	0
Vanderbilt * +	3	–	0	–	0	8	–	0	–	1
VPI	3	–	0	–	0	8	–	1	–	1
Florida	2	–	0	–	0	7	–	2	–	0
Auburn	2	–	1	–	0	8	–	2	–	0
Tennessee	3	–	2	–	0	8	–	2	–	0
Alabama	3	–	2	–	1	6	–	3	–	1
Virginia	1	–	1	–	1	4	–	4	–	1
Mississippi A&M	2	–	3	–	0	3	–	4	–	2
Kentucky	1	–	2	–	0	6	–	3	–	0
Clemson	1	–	2	–	0	5	–	4	–	0
Washington and Lee	1	–	2	–	0	5	–	3	–	1
Maryland	1	–	2	–	0	4	–	5	–	1
LSU	1	–	2	–	0	3	–	7	–	0
Georgia	1	–	3	–	1	5	–	4	–	1
Tulane	1	–	4	–	0	4	–	4	–	0
South Carolina	0	–	2	–	0	5	–	4	–	0
Ole Miss	0	–	2	–	0	4	–	5	–	1
NC State	0	–	5	–	0	4	–	6	–	0
+ – Conference co-champions; * – co-member of SIAA

The 1922 North Carolina Tar Heels football team represented the University of North Carolina in the 1922 college football season. Led by second year head coaches Bob Fetzer and Bill Fetzer, the team compiled a record of 9–1 and tied for the Southern Conference (SoCon) championship. The team's quarterback was Monk McDonald.

== Schedule ==
Date	Time	Opponent	Site	Result	Attendance	Source
September 30		vs. Wake Forest*	Wayne Athletic Field; Goldsboro, NC (rivalry)	W 62–3	2,427	
October 7	3:00 p.m.	at Yale*	Yale Bowl; New Haven, CT	L 0–18	15,000	
October 12		Trinity (NC)*	Emerson Field; Chapel Hill, NC (rivalry)	W 20–0	3,897	
October 14		South Carolina	Emerson Field; Chapel Hill, NC (rivalry)	W 10–7	2,649	
October 19	3:00 p.m.	at NC State	Riddick Field; Raleigh, NC (rivalry)	W 14–9	9,756	
October 28		Maryland	Emerson Field; Chapel Hill, NC	W 27–3	2,888	
November 4		at Tulane	Second Tulane Stadium; New Orleans, LA	W 19–12	10,000	
November 11	2:30 p.m.	vs. VMI*	Mayo Island Park; Richmond, VA	W 9–7	8,233	
November 18	2:30 p.m.	vs. Davidson*	Wearn Field; Charlotte, NC	W 29–6	7,500	
November 30	2:30 p.m.	at Virginia	Lambeth Field; Charlottesville, VA (rivalry)	W 10–7	6,962	
*Non-conference game; All times are in Eastern time
