= 1922 Clemson Tigers football team =

American college football season

1922 Clemson Tigers football
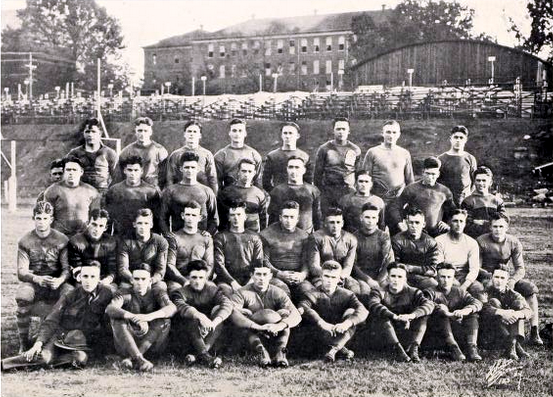
- Conference: Southern Conference
- Record: 5–4 (1–2 SoCon)
- Head coach: E. J. Stewart (2nd season)
- Captain: E. H. Emanuel
- Home stadium: Riggs Field

1922 Southern Conference football standings
	Conf.					Overall
Team	W		L		T	W		L		T
North Carolina +	5	–	0	–	0	9	–	1	–	0
Georgia Tech +	4	–	0	–	0	7	–	2	–	0
Vanderbilt * +	3	–	0	–	0	8	–	0	–	1
VPI	3	–	0	–	0	8	–	1	–	1
Florida	2	–	0	–	0	7	–	2	–	0
Auburn	2	–	1	–	0	8	–	2	–	0
Tennessee	3	–	2	–	0	8	–	2	–	0
Alabama	3	–	2	–	1	6	–	3	–	1
Virginia	1	–	1	–	1	4	–	4	–	1
Mississippi A&M	2	–	3	–	0	3	–	4	–	2
Kentucky	1	–	2	–	0	6	–	3	–	0
Clemson	1	–	2	–	0	5	–	4	–	0
Washington and Lee	1	–	2	–	0	5	–	3	–	1
Maryland	1	–	2	–	0	4	–	5	–	1
LSU	1	–	2	–	0	3	–	7	–	0
Georgia	1	–	3	–	1	5	–	4	–	1
Tulane	1	–	4	–	0	4	–	4	–	0
South Carolina	0	–	2	–	0	5	–	4	–	0
Ole Miss	0	–	2	–	0	4	–	5	–	1
NC State	0	–	5	–	0	4	–	6	–	0
+ – Conference co-champions; * – co-member of SIAA

The 1922 Clemson Tigers football team represented Clemson Agricultural College—now known as Clemson University—as a member of the Southern Conference (SoCon) during the 1922 college football season. Led by E. J. Stewart in his second and final season as head coach, the Tigers compiled an overall record of 5–4 with a mark of 1–2 in conference play, tying for 11th place in the SoCon. E. H. Emanuel was the team captain. Clemson's 100th program win came on October 13 against Presbyterian.

== Schedule ==
Date	Opponent	Site	Result	Source
September 30	Centre*	Riggs Field; Calhoun, SC	L 0–21	
October 7	Newberry*	Riggs Field; Calhoun, SC	W 57–0	
October 13	Presbyterian*	Riggs Field; Calhoun, SC	W 13–0	
October 26	at South Carolina	State Fairgrounds; Columbia, SC (rivalry)	W 3–0	
November 4	at Georgia Tech	Grant Field; Atlanta, GA (rivalry)	L 7–21	
November 11	at The Citadel*	College Park Stadium; Charleston, SC	W 18–0	
November 18	Erskine*	Riggs Field; Calhoun, SC	W 52–0	
November 25	at Furman*	Manly Field; Greenville, SC	L 6–20	
December 2	vs. Florida	Barrs Field; Jacksonville, FL	L 14–47	
*Non-conference game
