= 1922 Tennessee Volunteers football team =

American college football season

1922 Tennessee Volunteers football
- Conference: Southern Conference
- Record: 8–2 (3–2 SoCon)
- Head coach: M. B. Banks (2nd season)
- Captain: Pap Striegel
- Home stadium: Shields–Watkins Field

1922 Southern Conference football standings
	Conf.					Overall
Team	W		L		T	W		L		T
North Carolina +	5	–	0	–	0	9	–	1	–	0
Georgia Tech +	4	–	0	–	0	7	–	2	–	0
Vanderbilt * +	3	–	0	–	0	8	–	0	–	1
VPI	3	–	0	–	0	8	–	1	–	1
Florida	2	–	0	–	0	7	–	2	–	0
Auburn	2	–	1	–	0	8	–	2	–	0
Tennessee	3	–	2	–	0	8	–	2	–	0
Alabama	3	–	2	–	1	6	–	3	–	1
Virginia	1	–	1	–	1	4	–	4	–	1
Mississippi A&M	2	–	3	–	0	3	–	4	–	2
Kentucky	1	–	2	–	0	6	–	3	–	0
Clemson	1	–	2	–	0	5	–	4	–	0
Washington and Lee	1	–	2	–	0	5	–	3	–	1
Maryland	1	–	2	–	0	4	–	5	–	1
LSU	1	–	2	–	0	3	–	7	–	0
Georgia	1	–	3	–	1	5	–	4	–	1
Tulane	1	–	4	–	0	4	–	4	–	0
South Carolina	0	–	2	–	0	5	–	4	–	0
Ole Miss	0	–	2	–	0	4	–	5	–	1
NC State	0	–	5	–	0	4	–	6	–	0
+ – Conference co-champions; * – co-member of SIAA

The 1922 Tennessee Volunteers football team (variously "Tennessee", "UT" or the "Vols") represented the University of Tennessee in the 1922 college football season. Playing as a member of the Southern Conference (SoCon), the team was led by head coach M. B. Banks, in his second year, and played their home games at Shields–Watkins Field in Knoxville, Tennessee. The 1922 Vols won eight games, lost two, and tied zero (8–2 overall, 3–2 in the SoCon). The Volunteers outscored their opponents 239 to 45 and posted four shutouts.

== Schedule ==
Date	Opponent	Site	Result	Attendance	Source
September 23	Emory and Henry*	Shields–Watkins Field; Knoxville, TN	W 50–0		
September 30	Carson–Newman*	Shields–Watkins Field; Knoxville, TN	W 32–7		
October 7	Maryville (TN)*	Shields–Watkins Field; Knoxville, TN	W 21–0		
October 14	at Fort Benning*	Driving Park Stadium; Columbus, GA	W 15–0	5,000	
October 21	at Georgia	Sanford Field; Athens, GA (rivalry)	L 3–7		
October 28	Ole Miss	Shields–Watkins Field; Knoxville, TN (rivalry)	W 49–0		
November 4	Vanderbilt	Shields–Watkins Field; Knoxville, TN (rivalry)	L 6–14		
November 11	vs. Mississippi A&M	Russwood Park; Memphis, TN	W 31–3	10,000	
November 18	vs. Sewanee*	Chamberlain Field; Chattanooga, TN	W 18–7	4,000	
November 30	Kentucky	Shields–Watkins Field; Knoxville, TN (rivalry)	W 14–7		
*Non-conference game
