= Thomas J. Campbell (American football) =

American banker and college football coach

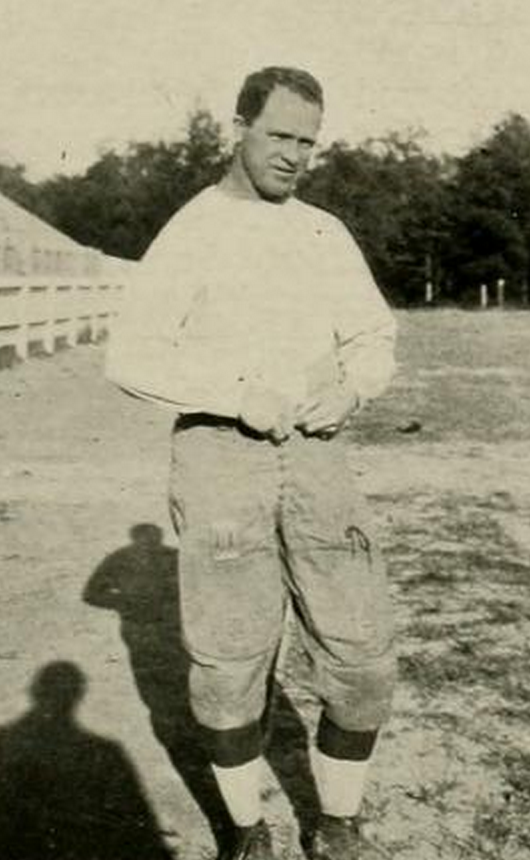
- Campbell pictured in Yackety Yack 1917, UNC yearbook

Biographical details
- Born: October 27, 1886; Gardner, Massachusetts, U.S.
- Died: February 28, 1972 (aged 85); South Natick, Massachusetts, U.S.

Playing career
- 1910–1911: Harvard
- Position: Halfback

Coaching career (HC unless noted)
- 1912: Morristown HS (NJ)
- 1913–1914: Harvard (assistant)
- 1915: Bowdoin
- 1916–1919: North Carolina
- 1922: Virginia
- 1923–1924: Harvard (freshmen)

Head coaching record
- Overall: 16–16–2 (college)

Thomas Joseph Campbell (October 27, 1886 – February 28, 1972) was an American banker and football player and coach. He served as the head football coach at Bowdoin College in 1915, at the University of North Carolina at Chapel Hill from 1916 to 1919, and at the University of Virginia in 1922, compiling a career college football record of 16–16–2. Campbell played football at Harvard University, from which he graduated in 1912.

Campbell married Mildred Bell in 1920 in New York.

== Coaching career ==
In 1916 and 1919, Campbell served as the head coach at the University of North Carolina at Chapel Hill, where he compiled a 9–7–1 record. From 1917 to 1918, he served in the military during World War I while North Carolina's football program was suspended. In 1922, Campbell coached at the University of Virginia, tallying a mark of 4–4–1.

== Head coaching record ==
=== College ===
Year	Team	Overall	Conference	Standing	Bowl/playoffs
Bowdoin Polar Bears () (1915)
1915	Bowdoin	3–5			
Bowdoin:		3–5			
North Carolina Tar Heels (South Atlantic Intercollegiate Athletic Association) (1916–1919)
1916	North Carolina	5–4	3–1	T–5th	
1917	No team—World War I				
1918	No team—World War I				
1919	North Carolina	4–3–1	3–1	T–3rd	
North Carolina:		9–7–1	6–2		
Virginia Orange and Blue (Southern Conference) (1922)
1922	Virginia	4–4–1	1–1–1	9th	
Virginia:		4–4–1	1–1–1		
Total:		16–16–2			
