= 1922 Alabama vs. Penn football game =

1922 Alabama Crimson Tide vs. Penn Quakers football game
Alabama Crimson Tide	Penn Quakers
(2–2–1)	(5–0)
9	7
Head coach: Xen C. Scott	Head coach: John Heisman
	1	2	3	4	Total
Alabama	0	3	6	0	9
Penn	0	7	0	0	7
- Date: November 4, 1922
- Season: 1922
- Stadium: Franklin Field
- Location: Philadelphia, Pennsylvania
- Referee: E. J. O'Brien
- Attendance: 20,000

The 1922 Alabama vs. Pennsylvania football game, played November 4, 1922, was a college football game between the Alabama Crimson Tide and Penn Quakers. Beating one of the "big 4" Ivy League institutions in a major upset, it is considered one of the most important wins in Alabama football history, giving the team some of its first national recognition. One writer called the game the hardest fought battle on Penn's field in seven years.

== Background ==
It was the second game at the newly renovated Franklin Field; the first an important victory for Penn over Navy.

John Heisman's Penn team was highly favored. Noted sports columnist Grantland Rice predicted a 21–0 Quaker victory.

== Game details ==
Alabama quarterback Charles Bartlett set up the winning touchdown with a dash from the 35-yard line to the 6. College Football Hall of Fame inductee Pooley Hubert was a freshman at fullback.

== Aftermath ==
After the game, when the news reached Tuscaloosa, "they started burning red fires and celebrating in a manner that Tuscaloosa had never seen before in its history."

Bartlett received Walter Camp's All-America honorable mention,
