= Roland Cowell =

American football, basketball, and baseball coach

Biographical details
- Born: September 22, 1895; Clyde, Kansas, U.S.
- Died: August 27, 1953 (aged 57)

Coaching career (HC unless noted)

Football
- 1922–1923: Ole Miss
- 1924–1925: Des Moines
- 1926–1928: Northern Illinois State

Basketball
- 1926–1929: Northern Illinois State

Baseball
- 1927–1929: Northern Illinois State

Administrative career (AD unless noted)
- 1924–1926: Des Moines
- 1926–1929: Northern Illinois State

Head coaching record
- Overall: 16–35–5 (football); 12–8 (baseball)

Roland Adhemar Cowell (September 22, 1895 – August 27, 1953) was an American football, basketball, and baseball coach and college athletics administrator. Contemporary newspaper reports often referred to him as R. A. Cowell.

Cowell served as the head football coach at the University of Mississippi (Ole Miss) from 1922 to 1923, Des Moines University, from 1924 to 1925 and Northern Illinois State Teachers College—now known as Northern Illinois University—from 1926 to 1928. Cowell was also the head basketball coach at Northern Illinois from 1926 to 1929 and the head baseball coach at the school from 1927 to 1929. Cowell was an assistant coach in basketball, baseball, and track at Ole Miss.

Cowell was a graduate of the University of Illinois where he also played football. His brother, Butch Cowell, was also a coach and administrator in college athletics.

== Head coaching record ==
=== Football ===
Year	Team	Overall	Conference	Standing	Bowl/playoffs
Ole Miss Rebels (Southern Conference) (1922–1923)
1922	Ole Miss	4–5–1	0–2	T–18th	
1923	Ole Miss	4–6	0–4	T–19th	
Ole Miss:		8–11–1	0–6		
Des Moines Tigers (North Central Conference) (1924–1925)
1924	Des Moines	2–6	1–3	6th	
1925	Des Moines	0–7–1	0–4	8th	
Des Moines:		2–13–1	1–7		
Northern Illinois State Teachers (Independent) (1926–1927)
1926	Northern Illinois State	5–1–1			
1927	Northern Illinois State	1–4–1			
Northern Illinois State Teachers (Illinois Intercollegiate Athletic Conference) (1928)
1928	Northern Illinois State	0–6–1	0–2–1	T–19th	
Northern Illinois State:		6–11–3	0–2–1		
Total:		16–35–5			
