= Win Charles =

American football player (1903–1949)

Profile
- Position: ?

Personal information
- Born: September 26, 1903
- Died: January 29, 1949 (aged 45)
- Listed height: 5 ft 9 in (1.75 m)
- Listed weight: 160 lb (73 kg)

Career information
- College: William & Mary

Career history
- Dayton Triangles (1928)

Career NFL statistics
- Games played: 5
- Stats at Pro Football Reference

Winston Holt "Win" Charles (September 26, 1903 – January 29, 1949) was an American professional football player for the American Professional Football Association's Dayton Triangles. He played in five games in the 1928 season. Charles played college football at William & Mary. He was shot to death on January 29, 1949. His wife, Ivy Patterson Charles, was convicted of his murder on May 11, 1949 and sentenced to serve six years. She was denied a pardon by Governor Tuck on October 14, 1949.
