= Oscar Davis (American football) =

American football player

Profile
- Position: Guard

Personal information
- Listed weight: 182 lb (83 kg)

Career information
- College: Georgia Tech (1919–1922)

Awards and highlights
- Honors: All-American (1922); All-Southern (1921, 1922); Tech Athletics Hall of Fame; Tech All-Era Team (William Alexander Era)

Oscar Davis was an American football guard for the Georgia Tech Yellow Jackets of the Georgia Institute of Technology. He was selected All-Southern and is a member of the Tech Athletics Hall of Fame and Tech All-Era Team (William Alexander Era). Davis was selected All-American in 1922 by Lawrence Perry and Billy Evans.
