= John Fletcher (fullback) =

American football player (1901–1977)

Profile
- Position: Fullback

Personal information
- Born: March 31, 1901; Tifton, Georgia, U.S.
- Died: June 4, 1977 (aged 76); Tifton, Georgia, U.S.
- Listed weight: 200 lb (91 kg)

Career information
- College: Georgia (1921–1924)

Awards and highlights
- All-Southern (1922); Billy Evans's National Honor Roll (1922)

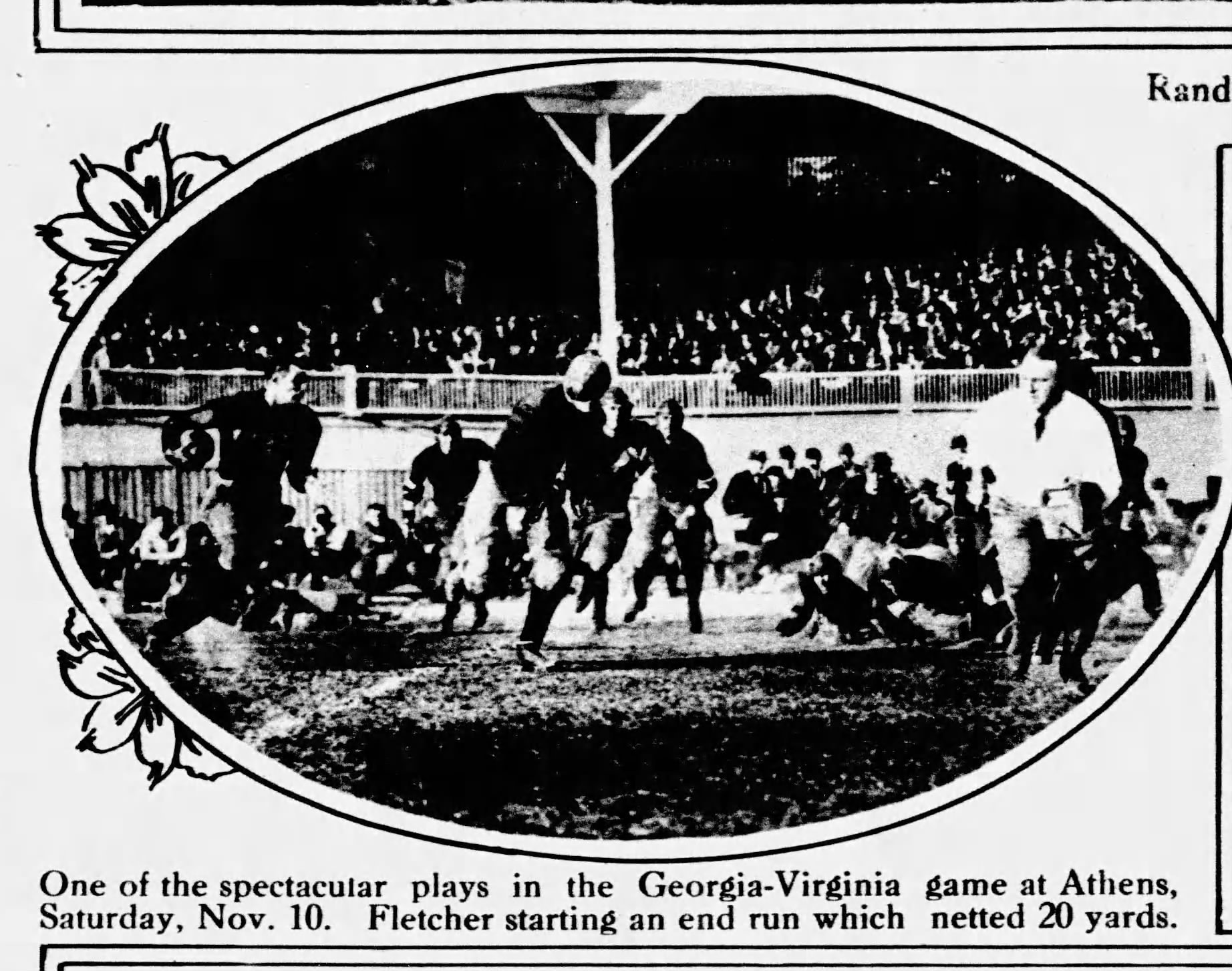
John Fletcher shown starting an end run, which netted 20 yards in a Georgia-Virginia football game on November 10, 1923.

John Hamilton Fletcher Sr. (March 31, 1901 – June 4, 1977) was an American college football player.

== College football ==
Fletcher was a prominent fullback for the Georgia Bulldogs of the University of Georgia, selected All-Southern in 1922. Walter Camp gave him honorable mention on his All-America team. In the game against Tennessee in 1923, one account reads "he rammed the ball almost the entire length of the field on two occasions." He was elected captain of the 1924 team, but went down with injury and had his place at captain filled by tackle Jim Taylor. At Georgia he was a member of Alpha Tau Omega.
