= 1922 Vanderbilt Commodores football team =

American college football season

1922 Vanderbilt Commodores football
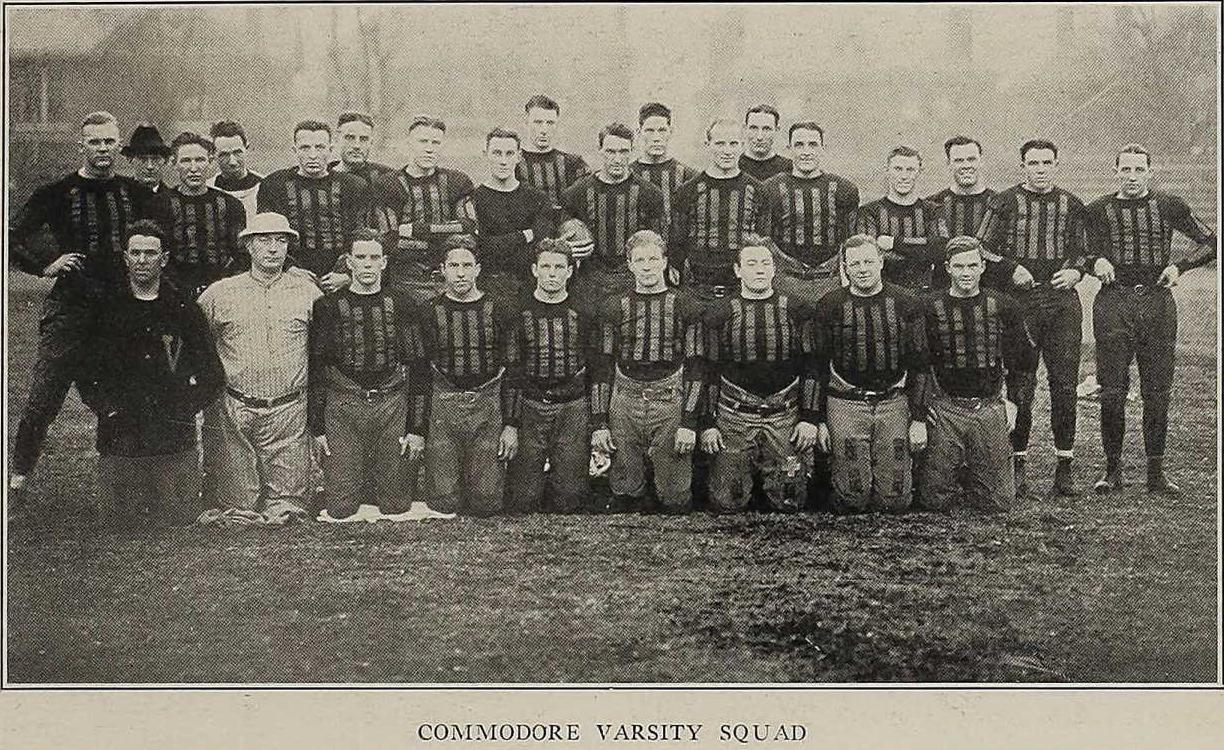

National champion (QPRS) SoCon co-champion
- Conference: Southern Conference, Southern Intercollegiate Athletic Association
- Record: 8–0–1 (3–0 SoCon, 2–0 SIAA)
- Head coach: Dan McGugin (18th season)
- Offensive scheme: Short punt
- Captain: Jess Neely
- Home stadium: Curry Field, Dudley Field

Uniform
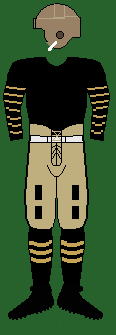

1922 Southern Conference football standings
	Conf.					Overall
Team	W		L		T	W		L		T
North Carolina +	5	–	0	–	0	9	–	1	–	0
Georgia Tech +	4	–	0	–	0	7	–	2	–	0
Vanderbilt * +	3	–	0	–	0	8	–	0	–	1
VPI	3	–	0	–	0	8	–	1	–	1
Florida	2	–	0	–	0	7	–	2	–	0
Auburn	2	–	1	–	0	8	–	2	–	0
Tennessee	3	–	2	–	0	8	–	2	–	0
Alabama	3	–	2	–	1	6	–	3	–	1
Virginia	1	–	1	–	1	4	–	4	–	1
Mississippi A&M	2	–	3	–	0	3	–	4	–	2
Kentucky	1	–	2	–	0	6	–	3	–	0
Clemson	1	–	2	–	0	5	–	4	–	0
Washington and Lee	1	–	2	–	0	5	–	3	–	1
Maryland	1	–	2	–	0	4	–	5	–	1
LSU	1	–	2	–	0	3	–	7	–	0
Georgia	1	–	3	–	1	5	–	4	–	1
Tulane	1	–	4	–	0	4	–	4	–	0
South Carolina	0	–	2	–	0	5	–	4	–	0
Ole Miss	0	–	2	–	0	4	–	5	–	1
NC State	0	–	5	–	0	4	–	6	–	0
+ – Conference co-champions; * – co-member of SIAA

1922 Southern Intercollegiate Athletic Association football standings
	Conf.					Overall
Team	W		L		T	W		L		T
Furman $	3	–	0	–	0	8	–	3	–	0
Vanderbilt*	2	–	0	–	0	8	–	0	–	1
Presbyterian	2	–	0	–	0	6	–	2	–	1
Mississippi College	2	–	0	–	0	6	–	3	–	0
Centre	1	–	0	–	0	8	–	2	–	0
Georgetown (KY)	1	–	0	–	0	1	–	1	–	0
Chattanooga	3	–	1	–	0	6	–	2	–	1
Western Kentucky	1	–	1	–	0	9	–	1	–	0
Sewanee	1	–	1	–	0	3	–	4	–	1
Millsaps	1	–	1	–	0	1	–	1	–	0
Mercer	1	–	2	–	0	4	–	6	–	0
Transylvania	0	–	1	–	0	0	–	1	–	0
The Citadel	0	–	2	–	0	3	–	5	–	0
Howard (AL)	0	–	2	–	0	2	–	6	–	2
Louisville	0	–	2	–	0	2	–	7	–	0
Wofford	0	–	2	–	0	2	–	7	–	0
Oglethorpe	0	–	4	–	0	1	–	9	–	0
$ – Conference champion; * – co-member of SoCon

The 1922 Vanderbilt Commodores football team represented Vanderbilt University during the 1922 Southern Conference football season. During the season, Dan McGugin's 18th as head coach, (Note: McGugin coached from 1904 to 1917 and then from 1919 to 1934. It is said he took 1918 off either to work in the mining business or because of the First World War.) Vanderbilt compiled a record of 8–0–1 (5–0 in conference games) (Note: Vanderbilt held dual membership as they were in both the SIAA and in SoCon. Sewanee also held dual membership, and Mercer was in the SIAA, so both games are counted as conference wins.) and outscored its opponents 177 to 16. The Commodores' defense was unrivaled in the South, leading the nation in giving up just 1.8 points per game, none of them at home. The season included a tie with Michigan at the dedication of the new Dudley Field; the first stadium in the South to be used exclusively for college football. The season was immediately dubbed one of the best in Vanderbilt and Southern football history.

It was also Vanderbilt's first year in the newly formed Southern Conference (SoCon), in which the team tied with North Carolina and Georgia Tech for the conference championship. This was Vanderbilt's second consecutive season as leader of its conference, having tied with Georgia, Centre, and Georgia Tech for the Southern Intercollegiate Athletic Association (SIAA) title in 1921. Recognized as the best southern team by several sportswriters, some consider Vanderbilt among the best teams in the US this season, along with Princeton, Cornell, California, Michigan, and Iowa. Both Clyde Berryman and James Howell named Vanderbilt as a retroactive national champion for the second consecutive year.

The team featured end and tackle Lynn Bomar, Vanderbilt's first member of the College Football Hall of Fame, and halfback and captain Jess Neely, who is in the Hall of Fame as a coach. Neely was one of Vanderbilt's greatest-ever team captains and was also the team's best passer. Neely to Bomar is considered among the best pass-receiver tandems in Vanderbilt's history.

Several Vanderbilt players received post-season honors. Walter Camp selected Bomar for his All-America team, a rarity for a player in the South. Walter Eckersall and Frank G. Menke also gave Bomar All-America honors. He was a unanimous All-Southern selection. Camp gave honorable mentions to Neely, quarterback Doc Kuhn, and end and punter Scotty Neill. Bomar and Kuhn also appear on Billy Evans' National Honor Roll; Bomar, Neill, Kuhn, and three other Commodores players were selected for his Southern Honor Roll.

== Schedule ==
Date	Time	Opponent	Site	Result	Attendance	Source
September 30	3:00 p.m.	Middle Tennessee State Normal*	Curry Field; Nashville, TN	W 38–0	2,500	
October 7		Henderson-Brown*	Curry Field; Nashville, TN	W 33–0		
October 14	2:15 p.m.	Michigan*	Dudley Field; Nashville, TN	T 0–0	16,000	
October 21	3:00 p.m.	at Texas*	Fair Park Stadium; Dallas, TX	W 20–10	11,000	
October 28		Mercer*	Dudley Field; Nashville, TN	W 25–0		
November 4		at Tennessee	Shields–Watkins Field; Knoxville, TN (rivalry)	W 14–6	7,000	
November 11	2:30 p. m.	Kentucky	Dudley Field; Nashville, TN (rivalry)	W 9–0	12,000	
November 18	3:00 p.m.	at Georgia	Sanford Field; Athens, GA (rivalry)	W 12–0		
November 30	2:00 p.m.	Sewanee*	Dudley Field; Nashville, TN (rivalry)	W 26–0	20,000	
*Non-conference game

== Before the season ==
The 1922 season included the new "try for a point" rule. Teams were allowed to either kick an extra point after a touchdown or to place the ball anywhere beyond the 5-yard line and try to score, either by touchdown or by a kick, and receive one point if successful. Under the "try for a point" rule, any foul by the defense meant the point was awarded to the offense and any foul by the offense invalidated the try.

Centre and Georgia Tech were favorites to repeat as champions of the South. Both had lost more players in the offseason than other teams, however. Vanderbilt, along with Auburn, Georgia, and Sewanee, retained enough experienced players to still be considered contenders. Nationally, traditional Eastern teams Yale, Harvard, and Princeton, as well as Cornell and Navy were expected to play for the title. Michigan was favored to win the West.

Vanderbilt entered the first season of the new Southern Conference (SoCon) on March 9. Freshmen were barred from play, and as such the coaches prepared to choose the roster spots from their pool of 23 veteran players. The team included players from Nashville and central Tennessee, including captain Jess Neely, who came from Middle Tennessee State Normal School. His older brother Bill Neely was captain in 1910.

Fifteen starters returned from the previous season including: Neely, Doc Kuhn, Percy Conyers, Alfred Sharp, Tot McCullough, Hugh Mixon, Hek Wakefield, Red Rountree, Freddie Meiers, Tex Bradford, and Fatty Lawrence. Lynn Bomar, who played fullback in 1921, and backup quarterback Alvin Bell were returning for their sophomore campaigns.

Newcomers included guard Garland Morrow and halfback Gil Reese – who was given particular attention from first-year backfield coach Lewie Hardage. Guard Tuck Kelly was a transfer who had formerly played center for Kentucky. Tom Zerfoss, the new varsity assistant and head coach of the freshman team, had also once transferred from Kentucky to Vanderbilt.

After last season, the yearbook noted the Commodores "should have a good chance to repeat the splendid record of '21", expecting to lose just captain Pink Wade (Note: Though coach Dan McGugin was "moving heaven and earth" to get him to return for another year.) and Fats Bailey to graduation. Georgia coach Herman Stegeman predicted a fine season for Vanderbilt in 1922. One commentator noted the Commodores' increase in weight.

Last season's leading scorer Rupert Smith also did not return; neither did end and punter Thomas Ryan, who preferred to remain at his job in the oil industry in Tampico, Mexico. The team also lost tackle Pos Elam, who decided to attend the Middle Tennessee State Normal School.

== Game summaries ==
=== Week 1: Middle Tennessee State Normal ===
Week 1: Middle Tennessee Normal at Vanderbilt

Team	1	2	3	4	Total
Normal	0	0	0	0	0
• Vanderbilt	7	25	0	6	38

- Date: September 30
- Location: Curry Field
  Nashville, Tennessee
- Game attendance: 2,500

Vanderbilt's season opened on September 30, with a 38–0 victory over the Middle Tennessee State Normal at Curry Field. (Note: After former Vanderbilt quarterback Irby "Rabbit" Curry, who died in aerial combat during the First World War. This was to distinguish it from the larger, new Dudley Field used later in the season, as the Commodores had outgrown their old stadium.) The Middle Tennessee State Normal School's team was led by Alfred B. Miles in his eighth season as head coach. The game was marked by "the brilliant running of Gil Reese". As well as Reese, game accounts praise quarterback Doc Kuhn and halfback Freddie "Froggy" Meiers for displaying skill while sprinting around broken fields.

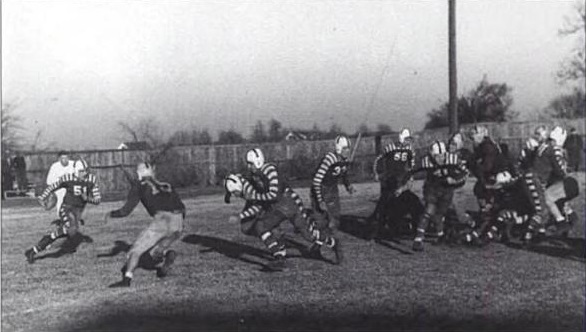
The Normal team c. 1922

Vanderbilt scored all of its touchdowns via end runs and forward passes, which the Normal School's publication The Normalite said attested to the underwhelming play of the Commodores' line against Normal's squad of "big stalwart, husky fellows, with proper training in the fundamentals of the game". (Note: Before the game, writers noted the great size of the Normal line players, whose weight averaged 185 pounds (84 kg).) Normal's best play was its only first down, a 12 yd (11 m) end run from its halfback Delay.

Vanderbilt coaches expected more from their attempted line plunges and were concerned by the weak showing of the line which needed to improve if Vanderbilt was to have confidence in the mid-season, and in particular against Michigan.

The starting lineup was: McCullough (left end), Bomar (left tackle), Morrow (left guard), Sharp (center), Kelly (right guard), Lawrence (right tackle), Neil (right end), Kuhn (quarterback), Wakefield (left halfback), Neely (right halfback), and Porter (fullback).

=== Week 2: Henderson-Brown ===
Week 2: Henderson-Brown at Vanderbilt

Team	1	2	3	4	Total
Henderson	0	0	0	0	0
• Vanderbilt	7	0	6	20	33

- Date: October 7
- Location: Curry Field
  Nashville, Tennessee
- Referee: Alf Adams

In the second game of the year, Vanderbilt beat Henderson-Brown 33–0. Vanderbilt was sluggish in the first half, which saw Doc Kuhn, Alvin Bell, and Freddie Meiers each play quarterback, but apparently failing to find a rhythm. Vanderbilt was limited to three first downs in the first half, while Henderson-Brown was limited to two. The only points scored during the half was a 70 yd (64 m) touchdown run in the first quarter as Commodore halfback Gil Reese darted through the entire Henderson-Brown defense. Hek Wakefield kicked a goal. Reese's long run was an anomaly in the first half. Vanderbilt's running backs were generally ineffective and its line was arguably outplayed by the weaker line of Henderson-Brown. The Commodores did not complete a single pass during the game. Henderson-Brown also had no success with the passing game; its only attempt was broken up by Vanderbilt's defense.

Vanderbilt found its stride in the second half, scoring 26 points including touchdowns on defense and a blocked punt. Halfback Red Rountree took over at quarterback, sparking the offense. Two drives resulted in nine first downs and two touchdowns, one by Jess Neely and the other by Rountree soon after the fourth quarter had started. Fatty Lawrence recovered a fumble in the end zone for Vanderbilt's fourth touchdown. Later in the fourth quarter, Garland Morrow broke through the line and blocked a punt that crossed the goal line and was recovered by Scotty Neill for the final touchdown. Hugh Mixon accounted for two extra points.

The starting lineup was: McCullough (left end), Bradford (left tackle), Morrow (left guard), Sharp (center), Kelly (right guard), Walker (right tackle), Conyers (right end), Kuhn (quarterback), Reese (left halfback), Neely (right halfback), and Wakefield (fullback).

=== Week 3: Michigan ===
Week 3: Michigan at Vanderbilt

Team	1	2	3	4	Total
Michigan	0	0	0	0	0
Vanderbilt	0	0	0	0	0

- Date: October 14
- Location: Dudley Field
  Nashville, Tennessee
- Game attendance: 16,000
- Referee: Horatio B. Hackett

The third game brought the high point of the season, a scoreless tie with Michigan Wolverines at the dedication of Dudley Field. The tie was the greatest of achievements for the underdog Commodores, and "a great surprise to the sporting world." It features prominently in the school's history. According to one account: "The Commodores[,] surprising even to their followers, fought the Michigan eleven, headed by Coach Yost, to a standstill." Another account reads: "Thousands of cheering Vanderbilt fans inspired the surge of center Alfred Sharp, guard Gus Morrow, tackle Tex Bradford, and end Lynn Bomar, who stopped Michigan cold in four attempts." Commodore fans celebrated by throwing around 3,000 seat cushions onto the field. Many publications called it "one of the big moments of the gridiron season".

The game matched Michigan head coach Fielding H. Yost against his former player and brother-in-law Dan McGugin. McGugin learned what he knew of football while playing under Yost as a guard on Michigan's "point-a-minute" offense; Yost recommended McGugin for the Vanderbilt job. Owing to the relationship between Yost and McGugin, Vanderbilt and Michigan played nine times between 1905 and 1923, with Michigan winning eight times. The 1922 game was the first since 1913.

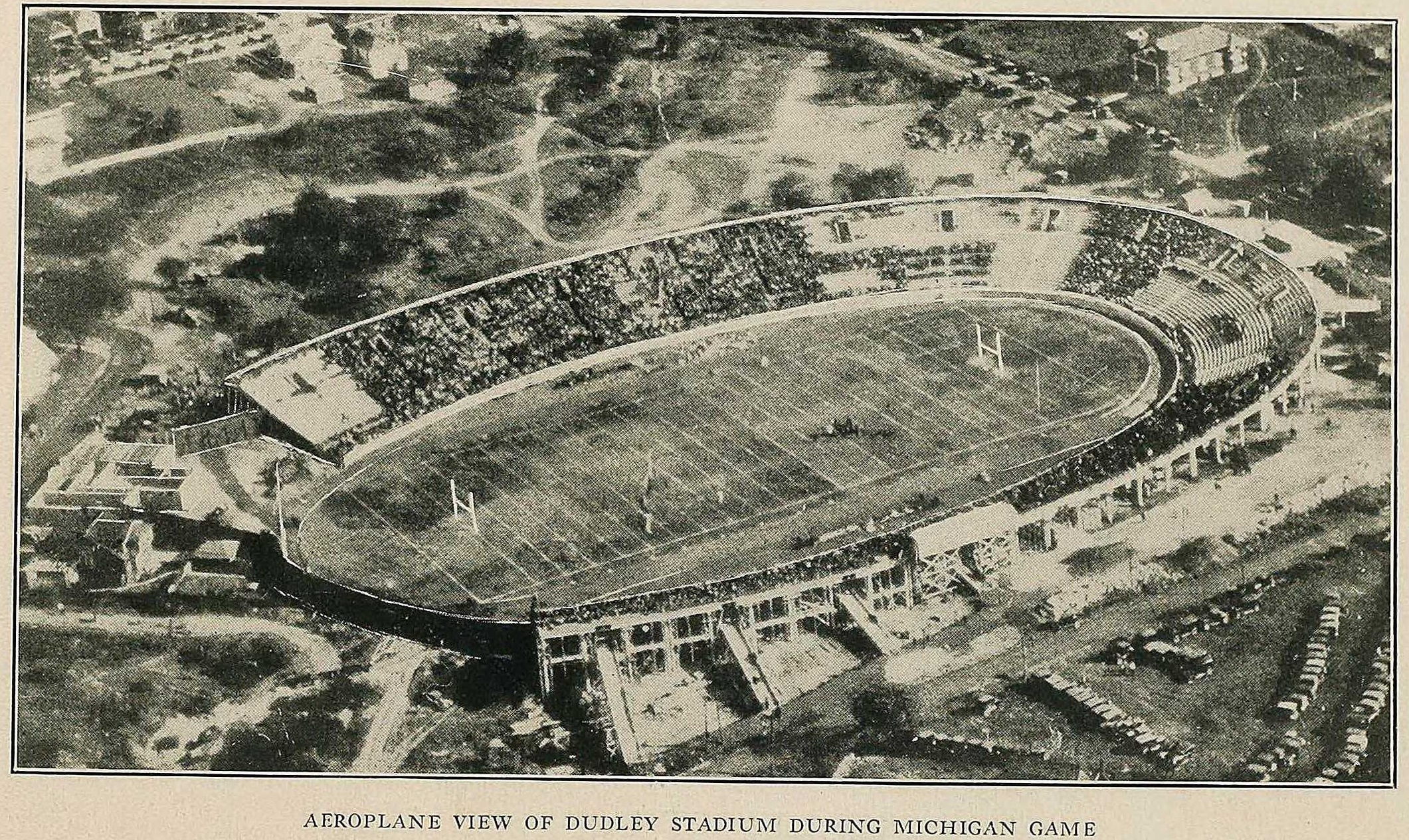
Aerial view of Dudley Field during the game.

The Wolverines were a national power and the favorite to win the game. Michigan had beaten Vanderbilt at all prior meetings, and had the much healthier lineup. During the pre-game dressing room talk, coach McGugin is reported to have said: "You are going against Yankees, some of whose grandfathers killed your grandfathers in the Civil War." Also reported, probably more accurately, as: "Out there lie the bones of your grandfathers ... and down on that field are the grandsons of the Yankee soldiers who put them there", referring to a nearby military cemetery. Ironically, Yost's father was a Confederate veteran, and McGugin's father was an officer in the Union Army.

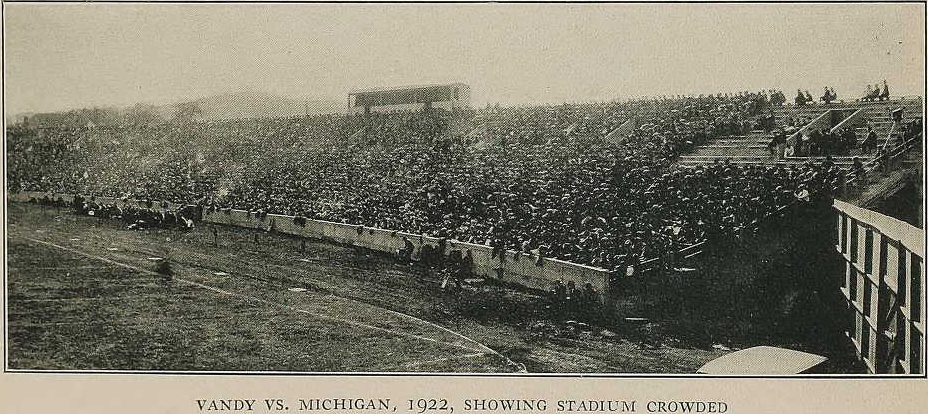
The crowded stadium

The game, which featured the season's top-two defenses as measured by points against per game, saw little offense. Vanderbilt punted 17 times; Michigan punted 10 times. Some writers were surprised by Michigan's lack of offense, citing it as their best feature. During the entire game, Michigan made six first downs, two of which came from penalties, while Vanderbilt made one. Michigan's consensus All-American halfback Harry Kipke had been rendered moot for most of the game and later said: "I picked myself up very, very painfully from every blade of grass in the place." Fullback Franklin Cappon seemed to be the only Michigan player who could gain much for his offense. According to the 2012 Vanderbilt Football Fact Book, the tie was preserved when captain Neely recovered a fumble near the Commodore goal.

A goal line stand was the Commodores' key play. A partially blocked Vanderbilt punt gave the Wolverines the ball at Vanderbilt's 25-yard line. Two end runs, two line bucks, and a forward pass brought them to first and goal after six minutes. The Commodores' defense repelled four touchdown attempts. Three runs straight up the middle were stopped before the goal line. Cappon made a yard, Kipke lost one, and Cappon then drove to within one ft (0.30 m) of the goal. Vanderbilt captain Jess Neely was heard shouting, "Stop 'em." On fourth down, Michigan faked a field goal and ran with Harry Kipke off tackle to the right. Kipke was stopped very close to the end zone. One Vanderbilt player pushed himself off the goal post in an attempt to generate a greater backwards thrust as the crowd cheered.

The starting lineup was: McCullough (left end), Bomar (left tackle), Morrow (left guard), Sharp (center), Kelly (right guard), Bradford (right tackle), Sc. Neill (right end), Kuhn (quarterback), Neely (left halfback), Reese (right halfback), and Wakefield (fullback).

=== Week 4: Texas ===
Week 4: Vanderbilt at Texas

Team	1	2	3	4	Total
• Vanderbilt	13	0	0	7	20
Texas	3	7	0	0	10

- Date: October 21
- Location: Fair Park Stadium
  Dallas
- Game attendance: 11,000
- Referee: A. M. Venne
- Sources

Vanderbilt then traveled to Dallas, to play the Texas Longhorns at the State Fair for the second consecutive year, beating them 20–10. Last year Texas, an experienced team, had been expected to defeat Vanderbilt's team of inexperienced players, but lost. This year, Vanderbilt was the fourteen-point favorite. Along with the Michigan game, the match up between Vanderbilt and Texas had been billed as one of the more important intersectional games since the beginning of the season, and among the best of them in the South.

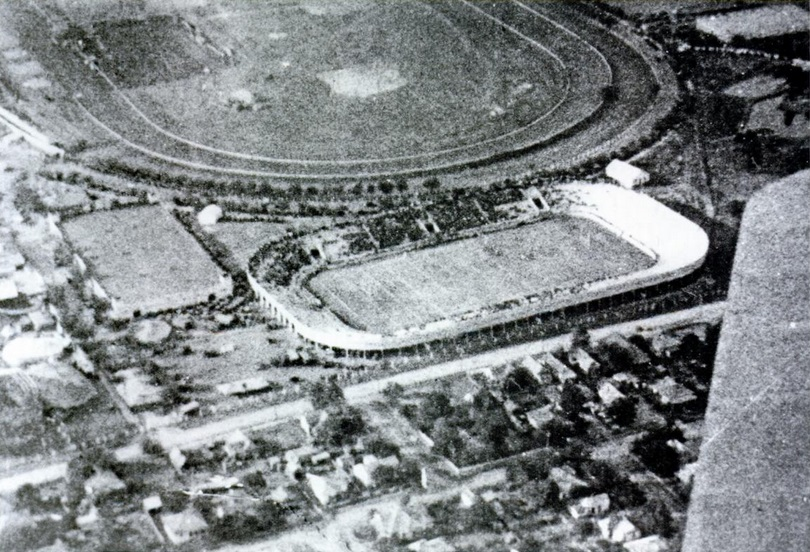
Fair Park Stadium circa 1922

The teams were fairly even in terms of weight, and Texas was strong between the tackles. A rough match was expected; an ambulance was kept at the ready near the stadium's entrance. Several key Vanderbilt players were injured: Neely, Morrow, and McCullough all experienced problems, leading to a significantly shortened playing time. Coach McGugin had said: "We are crippled beyond all repair, but we are going out to Texas to win."

The first score of the game came from Texas. After the kickoff went to Vanderbilt, Scotty Neill quickly punted back to Texas, as Vanderbilt had much faith in its defense. A 22-yard (20 m) run around the edge by Texas quarterback Franklin Stacy was the highlight of the ensuing drive. A few plays later, Texas found itself on Vanderbilt's 18-yard line. Vanderbilt committed an offsides penalty, moving Texas to the 13-yard line. Texas then lost yards and was at the 17-yard line when Stacy kicked a field goal.

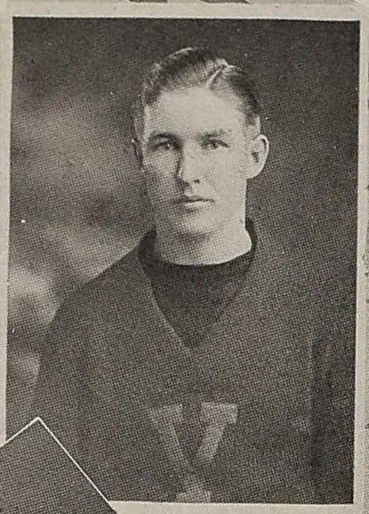
The speedy Gil Reese.

Later in the first quarter, Vanderbilt kicked to Stacy, who fumbled the ball, which was recovered by Hek Wakefield at the 25-yard line. Gil Reese ran twice around the edge, placing the ball at the 13-yard line. After working it to the goal, Reese scored with a short run off-tackle. The try was good and Vanderbilt led 7–3. Captain Neely broke a streak of lethargic offense from both teams, running back a 30-yard (27 m) punt return, to the 40-yard line. Soon after, Reese jetted around the end, "slipping here, twirling there", for a 45-yard (41 m) touchdown. The try was missed and the score was 13–3.

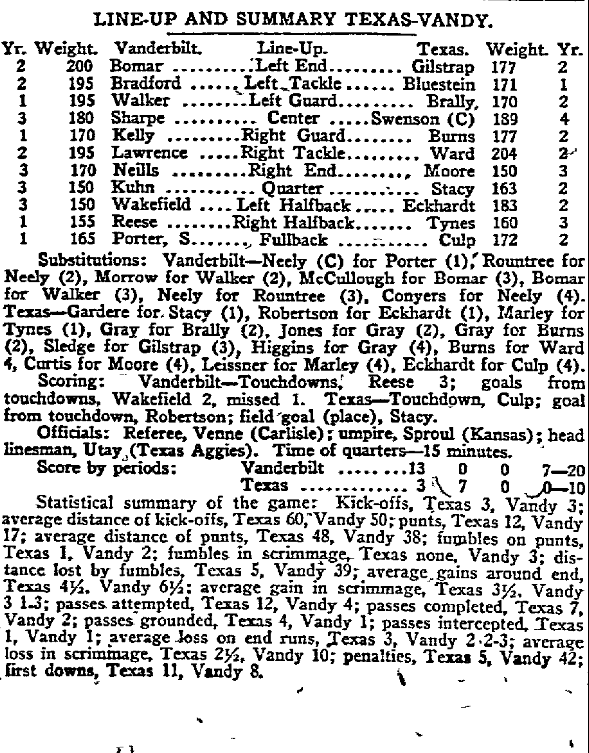
Line-up and summary

In the second quarter, a short Texas punt and Reese's return, Vanderbilt found itself in good field position at Texas's 45-yard line. On the next play, the Longhorns' Edwin Bluestein blew through the line and stopped Reese for a loss. Then came a 15-yard penalty on Neill for slugging. (Note: Neill was going to be ejected but this did not occur because Texas victim, center and captain 'Swede' Swenson, told the referees to allow him to stay.) The next play saw a clumsy toss to Neill resulting in a fumble recovered by Texas at the 29-yard line. Texas's James Marley then got loose for a 21 yards (19 m) run. A short run by Marley then set up a touchdown from Yancy Culp. Texas closed the gap, 13–10. Two unsuccessful field goal attempts by Texas ended the first half.

During the second half, Reese recovered his own fumble at the 18-yard line, giving Texas a temporary edge in field position. Texas's chance to score was missed when a pass from halfback Ivan Robertson was intercepted by Lynn Bomar. The field position then shifted in Vanderbilt's favor when Neill netted a punt of about 60-yard (55 m). In the fourth quarter, Neely hit Bomar on a long pass that went 23 yards (21 m) in the air, with Bomar running for some 20 yards (18 m) more and down close to the goal. Reese ran it in on the next play, and the try was good. Vanderbilt led Texas 20–10.

Robertson later recovered a Wakefield fumble on Vanderbilt's 20-yard line. The Longhorns worked the ball to the eight-yard line, but they failed to convert on the next series of downs as Marley fell short of the goal line. After a 52-yard (48 m) punt from Neill out of his own endzone, the teams traded interceptions. The last play of a vigorous drive saw a Texas run downed at about the 12-yard line as the game ended.

Gil Reese was the widely accepted player of the game, scoring all three of Vanderbilt's touchdowns. Doc Kuhn was praised for his contributions to the run game and his generalship at the quarterback position, as was Scotty Neill for his punting. The result of the 1922 game was much closer than that of the previous year. Texas played better than was expected. The number of first downs seemed to favor Texas; the Longhorns had fifteen first downs compared with the Commodores' eight. Referee A. M. Venne said Vanderbilt defeated Texas because of its crafty play, and "head work".'

The starting lineup was: Bomar (left end), Bradford (left tackle), Walker (left guard), Sharp (center), Kelly (right guard), Lawrence (right tackle), Sc. Neill (right end), Kuhn (quarterback), Wakefield (left halfback), Reese (right halfback), and S. Porter (fullback).

=== Week 5: Mercer ===
Week 5: Mercer at Vanderbilt

Team	1	2	3	4	Total
Mercer	0	0	0	0	0
• Vanderbilt	0	12	0	13	25

- Date: October 28
- Location: Dudley Field
  Nashville, Tennessee
- Referee: Russ Cohen

For the fifth game, Vanderbilt beat the Mercer Baptists by a 25–0 score in a "featureless match". Mercer was coached by former All-Southern tackle and Vanderbilt football star Josh Cody. Mercer's team was reduced; many of its star players were experiencing dengue fever. Included on the sick list were: Ed Irwin, Mercer's triple-threat end; right guard 'Judge' Dasher; left guard and team captain Carl Lancaster; halfback George Harmon, who had hurt his ankle; back-up center W. M. Barron, who had mumps; and tackle Beverly Gaines. It was reported that 'Coot' Lynch, replacement for Ed Irwin, was as good an end without Irwin's passing and punting ability. Glenn Carthron was to replace captain Lancaster, and though big, he did not compare to Lynch, who had just returned from an illness-related absence. Injuries aside, the Baptists outweighed the Commodores by more than 20 pounds (9.1 kg) per man.

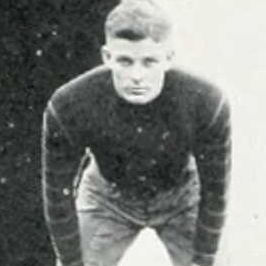
Red Rountree helped Vanderbilt beat Mercer.

For the entire 1922 season, Mercer had been unable to play a full lineup of regulars. Scoring would have been an achievement for the Mercer Baptists. Vanderbilt therefore used this game to rest its injured players and played mostly substitutes. Replacement quarterback Red Rountree was the star of the game, making possible all four of the Commodores' scores with his punt returns and end runs. The Baptists' star was fullback Dave Rice, who got the majority of their yardage on the ground. The first score came early in the second when substitute quarterback Red Rountree ran for 43 yards (39 m) around end. In the same period, Lynn Bomar hit Rountree on a 28-yard (26 m) pass, but Vanderbilt was unable to use this to score. The second touchdown came after a short punt from Mercer and a good return from Rountree set up a line buck into the end zone from Bomar.

In the fourth quarter, the Commodores saw two more touchdowns. A pass to Bomar, and a strong line plunge from S. T. Porter, accounted for the scores. Mercer's only chance to score came in the final quarter; after Vanderbilt had fumbled, Mercer completed a pass down to the 10-yard line when the game ended. Red Rountree finished the game with 132 yards (121 m) rushing and 109 yards (100 m) on punt returns. The Vanderbilt team gained 241 yards (220 m) of offense.

The starting lineup was: Brown (left end), Bomar (left tackle), Orr (left guard), W. Porter (center), Lawrence (right guard), Walker (right tackle), Sc. Neill (right end), Rountree (quarterback), Mixon (left halfback), Meiers (right halfback), and S. Porter (fullback).

=== Week 6: Tennessee ===
Week 6: Vanderbilt at Tennessee

Team	1	2	3	4	Total
• Vanderbilt	0	7	0	7	14
Tennessee	0	0	0	6	6

- Date: November 4
- Location: Shields–Watkins Field
  Knoxville, Tennessee
- Game attendance: 7,000
- Referee: Oscar Randolph

In the sixth game of the year, Vanderbilt beat the Tennessee Volunteers at Knoxville, 14–6 "principally due to the fact that Neill was able to outkick the great Campbell." (Note: It was Vanderbilt's first game at Shields–Watkins Field, the Volunteers' new stadium.) The Tennessee Volunteers were "after revenge"—they had only beaten the Commodores twice and Vanderbilt was ahead in points scored by 347 to 53.

Tennessee also hoped to improve its SoCon record after losing to the Georgia Bulldogs. Both teams had rested their starters the previous week; Vanderbilt won over Mercer and Tennessee beat Mississippi 49–0. It was therefore thought the game should be closer than in previous years, and Vanderbilt was only a slight favorite. The 18th meeting between Vanderbilt and Tennessee packed the stadium; it was the largest crowd of the season for Shields–Watkins Field. The game was hotly contested; several accounts wrote Vanderbilt was "outplayed but not outfought".

Tennessee drove down to the seven-yard line in the first quarter but was held on downs. The first score came from Vanderbilt in the second quarter on a 31-yard (28 m) touchdown pass from Jess Neely to Doc Kuhn. Wakefield kicked a goal. In the fourth quarter, Tennessee reached the one-yard line after a series of long passes. Tennessee fullback Roe Campbell went over the line for the touchdown. The Volunteers' Rufe Clayton failed to kick goal. Later, Vanderbilt intercepted a Tennessee pass in Volunteer territory, leading to a chance to score. After runs at the line failed, a 5-yard (4.6 m) pass from Neely to Lynn Bomar got the touchdown. Wakefield's try was successful.

After the game, Neilly, Lynn Bomar, Gil Reese, and Fatty Lawrence were all mentioned as the Commodores' best players; Campbell was cited as the star for the Volunteers. Accounts stated that Neill out-punted the Volunteers on nearly every occasion. The Nashville Banner said Lawrence had been "in there doing a man's job blocking a kick and tackling with the deadliness of a tiger unleashed in a cave of lions." The same week, Tulane lost to North Carolina, leaving Vanderbilt as the only undefeated member of the Southern Conference.

The starting lineup was: McCullough (left end), Bradford (left tackle), Morrow (left guard), Sharp (center), Kelly (right guard), Walker (right tackle), Sc. Neill (right end), Kuhn (quarterback), Neely (left halfback), Rountree (right halfback), and Wakefield (fullback).

=== Week 7: Kentucky ===
Week 7: Kentucky at Vanderbilt

Team	1	2	3	4	Total
Kentucky	0	0	0	0	0
• Vanderbilt	3	6	0	0	9

- Date: November 11
- Location: Dudley Field
  Nashville, Tennessee
- Game attendance: 12,000
- Referee: Ed Finlay

In the seventh week of play, Vanderbilt beat the Kentucky Wildcats in a "hard fought battle" by a 9–0 score. Although Vanderbilt was favored, a tough match was expected. Freddie Meiers was the star of the contest.

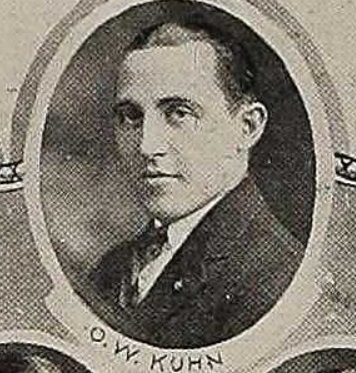
Vanderbilt quarterback Doc Kuhn

Lynn Bomar's kickoff, fielded by Turner Gregg, was returned to the 16-yard line. Three runs from Kentucky gained nine yards (8.2 m), and on fourth down the Wildcats punted the ball out of bounds at midfield. After the punt, Vanderbilt moved deeper into Kentucky territory. The drive started poorly; Doc Kuhn lost yards on a run around end. The next play was the beginning of Vanderbilt's success—Freddie Meiers had an eight-yard (7.3 m) run. Then on a fake kick, Bomar ran around the end for 5 yards (4.6 m). On the next play, an 18-yard (16 m) drop kick by Henry Wakefield split the uprights. Kentucky drove to Vanderbilt's 20-yard line on the next possession. Any attempt to move further was stopped by Vanderbilt's defense, and a 35-yard (32 m) dropkick from Gregg missed.

The Commodore's first drive of the second quarter centered around Kuhn, Meiers, and Jess Neely; but after reaching Kentucky's 35-yard line the ball was turned over on downs. Kentucky eventually punted away. The next series saw a 70-yard (64 m) drive from Vanderbilt. With fourth down on the one-yard line, Meiers punched it in for the touchdown. Wakefield's try was missed. A later punt by the Wildcats saw Kuhn return the ball 43 yards (39 m), tackled by the last man before the end zone—Kentucky's punter Gregg. The half ended before Vandy could use this to score.

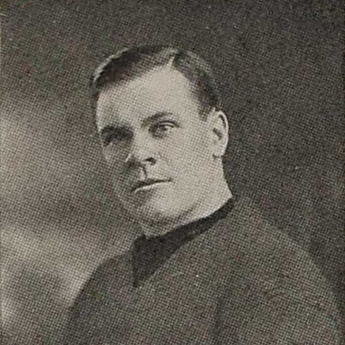
Scotty Neill, punter and end

Vanderbilt's play in the third quarter was hampered by fumbles. The ball was kicked off to Kuhn for a 12-yard (11 m) return. Meiers then fumbled the ball, which was recovered by Kentucky. During the ensuing possession, Vanderbilt jumped offside. Vanderbilt's defense made up for the Commodores' poor situation. Kentucky tried an end run that resulted in a loss of three yards (2.7 m) and on the next play a pass was intercepted by Bomar. The next Vanderbilt drive seemed promising with an average of more than five yards (4.6 m) per play, until Vanderbilt again fumbled the ball away. The Vanderbilt defense once more came to the rescue; Kentucky could not get 10 yards (9.1 m) and the ball went over on downs.

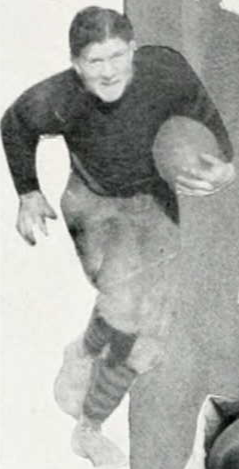
Freddie Meiers starred versus Kentucky.

The final quarter saw Kentucky attempt a hurried comeback led by forward passes. Only one was completed; a 30-yard (27 m) pass from Fuller to Hollowell. Vanderbilt sent in Gil Reese for Meiers, and Reese closed out the game. One play was a 35-yard (32 m) run; Reese failed to score because Kentucky's Brewer tackled his feet from behind. At Kentucky's 35-yard (32 m) line the drive was stalled with a turnover on downs.

At the end of the week, Vanderbilt was the only undefeated team left in the South; VMI had lost to North Carolina. (Note: West Virginia was also undefeated but was not considered part of the South.) The following week, Kentucky hosted the high-scoring Alabama Crimson Tide squad and was the only team of the season to hold that team scoreless.

The starting lineup was: Bomar (left end), Bradford (left tackle), Lawrence (left guard), Sharp (center), Kelly (right guard), Morrow (right tackle), Sc. Neill (right end), Kuhn (quarterback), Meiers (left halfback), Neely (right halfback), and Wakefield (fullback)

=== Week 8: Georgia ===
Week 8: Vanderbilt at Georgia

Team	1	2	3	4	Total
• Vanderbilt	6	0	6	0	12
Georgia	0	0	0	0	0

- Date: November 18
- Location: Sanford Field
  Athens, Georgia
- Referee: Jogger Elcock

The Georgia Bulldogs played Vanderbilt for their homecoming and were defeated 12–0, with Bomar described as a "holy terror" to the Bulldogs by W. C. Munday. Vanderbilt left the game as favorite to be crowned champions of the South. The game marked the last time Georgia had lost two consecutive games at home to Vanderbilt, having also lost 46–0 at Athens in 1912. Georgia was without its quarterback Dick Mulvehill. Governor-elect Clifford Walker was among the notables in the large crowd at Sanford Field.

Vanderbilt entered the Georgia game as slight favorites. Since it had held Yost's Michigan machine scoreless, it was thought Georgia could have a difficult time with the Commodores' defense. At that time, Vanderbilt usually beat Georgia; but the previous year, Vanderbilt had to fight to bring the game to a tie.

Every Georgia opponent had failed to score through its line during the 1920 and 1921 seasons, but the Bulldogs had defended the forward pass poorly in prior weeks. It was thought Vanderbilt should expose Georgia's defense by using the forward pass. This seemed to work, for though the Commodores were 3 for 9 on pass plays, they made those three count for around 90 yards (82 m). These passes showed the mark of "ceaseless drill" and seemed to come once Vanderbilt had Georgia's defense looking for the run.

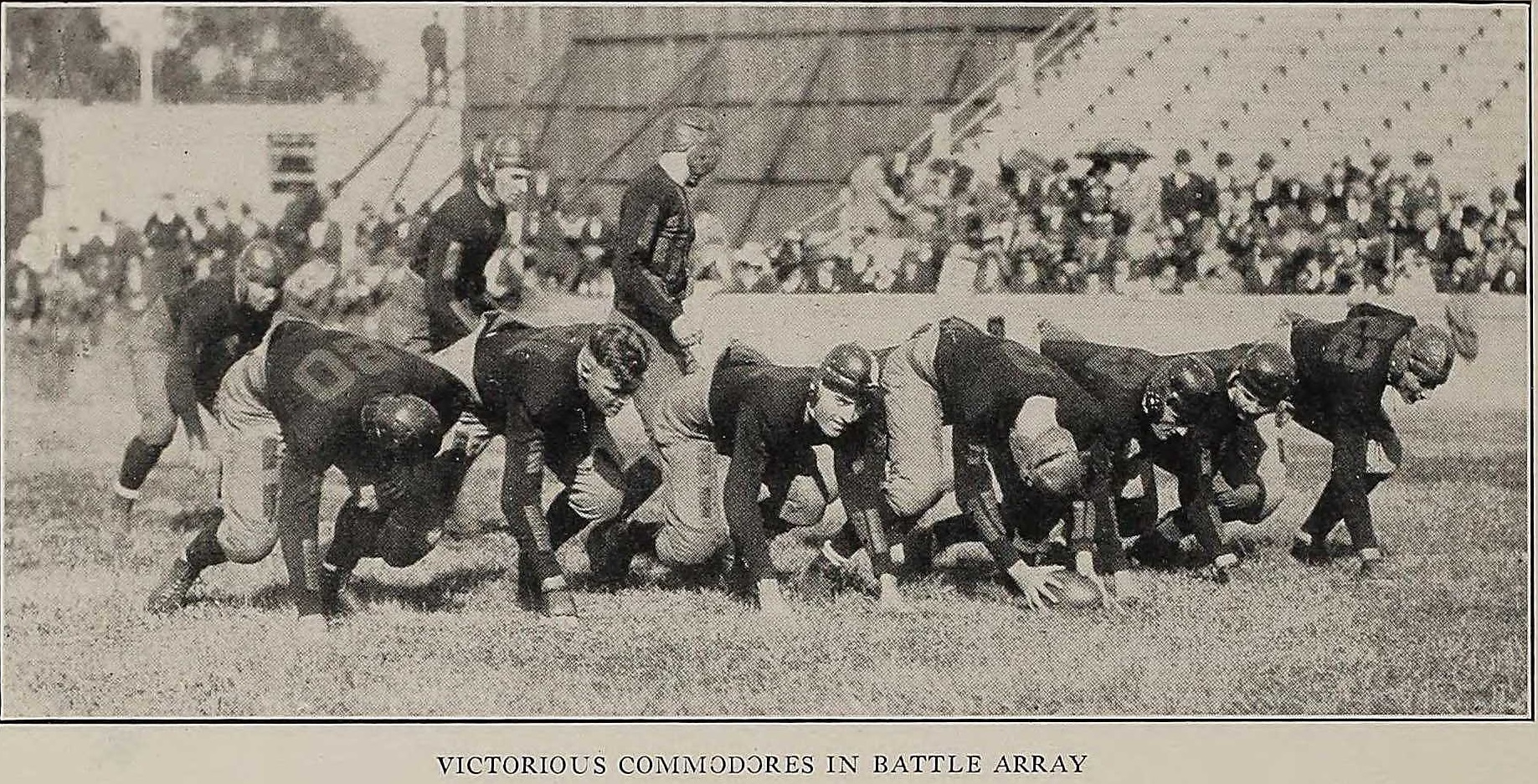
"Victorious Commodore Battle Array".

Vanderbilt found itself in another game where punts may have decided the victor. Scotty Neill punted 14 times with an average distance of 47 yards (43 m). Georgia punted 15 times with an average of 34 yards (31 m). Vanderbilt also had a play where, after a fair catch, the team lined up as if they were prepared to punt, and tried to recover a high, hanging onside kick from scrimmage. It was tried twice and failed, although Georgia seemed to be caught off-guard by the display. (Note: The Commodores may have tried the play because an onside kick saved them from losing to Georgia the year before.)

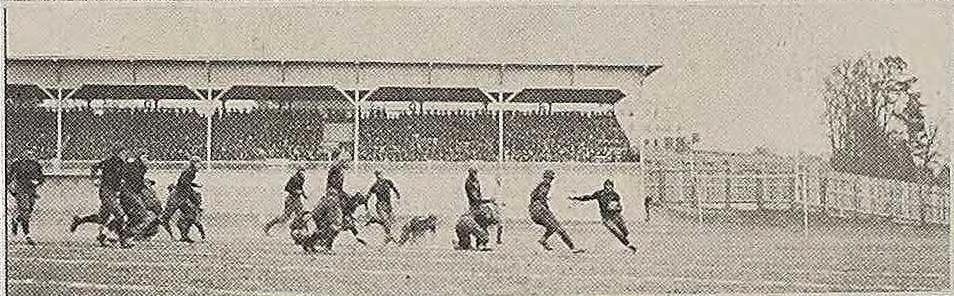
Action shot from the Georgia-Vanderbilt game.

The first score of the game came when Jess Neely hit Bomar on a long pass thrown from several yards behind the line of scrimmage at the 45-yard line. Bomar caught it near the seven-yard line and was downed by Georgia halfback Teany Randall after having run for 5 yards (4.6 m) more, close to the three-yard line. The next series of downs saw a touchdown from Reese on a run at the left tackle.

After a few series in the second quarter for both teams, Reese was hit hard on a punt return and fumbled. Georgia's Randall came out of the pile of players with the ball on Vanderbilt's 40-yard line; the crowd could be heard chanting, "Tie it up!" Fullback John Fletcher made nine yards (8.2 m) on a double pass play. A few plays later, Randall hit Paul Anderson on a pass play to get Georgia inside the 20-yard line. Two more runs by Fletcher for a net gain of nine yards (8.2 m) and Tanner barely getting the yard needed for a first down. Vanderbilt's defense stiffened after this, and a pass was knocked down at the two-yard line as the half ended.

To start the second half, Dave Collings kicked off to Freddie Meiers, who had the best run of the day with a return of 40 yards (37 m), giving Vanderbilt the ball at the 45-yard line. Neill punted to Randall, who fell on his own fumble at the 17-yard line. Reese returned the ensuing punt 20 yards (18 m) to Georgia's 44-yard line. Soon after, on a play similar to the touchdown in the first quarter, Doc Kuhn dropped back and hit Bomar for an over 40-yard (37 m) touchdown pass, which went 28 yards (26 m) in the air with Bomar running the rest of the way. Collings tackled Bomar as he was crossing the goal line, hurting himself. Wakefield missed the kick. Neither team had much success passing the ball in the fourth quarter and the game ended with a final score of 12–0.

The starting lineup was: Bomar (left end), Bradford (left tackle), Morrow (left guard), Sharp (center), Kelly (right guard), Walker (right tackle), Sc. Neill (right end), Kuhn (quarterback), Reese (left halfback), Neely (right halfback), and Wakefield (fullback).

=== Week 9: Sewanee ===
Week 9: Sewanee at Vanderbilt

Team	1	2	3	4	Total
Sewanee	0	0	0	0	0
• Vanderbilt	14	6	0	6	26

- Date: November 30
- Location: Dudley Field
  Nashville, Tennessee
- Game attendance: 20,000
- Referee: Horatio B. Hackett

Vanderbilt finished the season on November 30, Thanksgiving Day, with a game against its oldest rival, the Sewanee Tigers, at Dudley Field. Vanderbilt beat Sewanee by a larger-than-expected margin, 26–0. Clinching an undefeated season, the Commodores achieved 19 first downs to the Tigers' two. The crowd of 20,000 people was then the largest attendance ever at a football game in Nashville.

Sewanee got the ball first and rushed to within a yard of a first down but decided to kick the ball away. The Tigers went for an onside kick that was recovered by the Commodores on the 40-yard line. Scotty Neill then muffed a pass from center and was tackled for a 10-yard (9.1 m) loss. The ensuing punt by Neill went 43-yard (39 m). Sewanee failed to gain much and had a short punt out of bounds at the 43-yard line. This led to Vanderbilt's first scoring drive, which was marked by dashes around end from Gil Reese and powerful runs off-tackle by Freddie Meiers. Reese went around the right end for 13 yards (12 m). Meiers then ran all the way to Sewanee's 14-yard (13 m) line, and Reese skirted around left end for ten more. After Meiers failed to gain on the next play, Reese carried the ball for a score on a flank attack, and Hek Wakefield kicked the extra point.

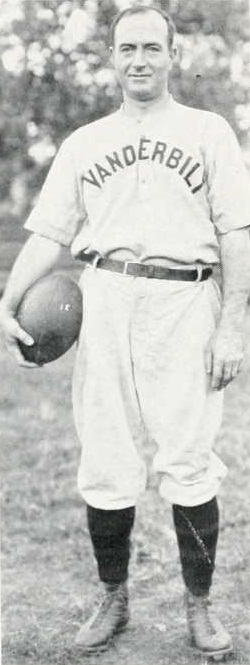
Coach Dan McGugin

A few minutes later, Vanderbilt scored another touchdown. Wakefield returned a kick for 33 yards (30 m) and Doc Kuhn ran out of bounds for a six-yard gain. Sewanee was then caught off-guard by a trick play. Reese tossed to Kuhn who faked a run. He tossed the ball to Lynn Bomar, who easily ran the remaining twenty-five yards (23 m) for the touchdown. Wakefield kicked the extra point.

In the second quarter, Sewanee tried to put a drive together unsuccessfully after holding Vanderbilt on downs at the 23-yard line. Near the end of the quarter, Bomar intercepted a Sewanee pass. Vanderbilt put together another scoring drive, this time started by Meiers running through Sewanee's line for a long gain. Reese then hit the line to no avail and a pass fell incomplete. Kuhn hit Neill on a 10-yard (9.1 m) pass to get the Commodores inside the five-yard line. On the next series, Kuhn faked his way through the line for a touchdown. The try failed.

The third quarter was Sewanee's best. After trading punts, Sewanee's offense started to click for the first time. The first long gain for Sewanee was because of a Vanderbilt penalty for roughness. Powers made nine-yard (8.2 m) around end, and Gibbons plunged over behind his tackles for four more. A long pass from Powers to end 'Shucks' Shook got Sewanee to about the eight-yard line. Vanderbilt's defense responded again, throwing Gibbons for a loss, and Sewanee's attempted field goal from the 11-yard line narrowly missed.

Vanderbilt returned to its previous success in the final quarter, with a drive described as a "savage attack". The Commodores got to Sewanee's 17-yard line when two passes failed, one dropped by Tex Bradford at the five-yard line, to turn the ball over on downs. Sewanee started to get desperate with passes, one of which was intercepted by George Waller. Runs around end and through the middle took Vanderbilt down to the one-yard line. After Kuhn got a short gain needed for a first down up the middle, Reese took two runs which together accounted for 19 yards (17 m). Reese then ran up behind center to power his way into the end zone. The umpire was knocked down on this play and had a sprained ankle. Sewanee's last drive featured a 29-yard (27 m) pass from Powers to captain Bill Coughlan, which went to the Commodores' 42-yard line. Three more passes were unsuccessful. On fourth down, Sewanee hit a nine-yard (8.2 m) pass, not enough for the first down. The game ended shortly after Vanderbilt's offense took the field, ensuring Vanderbilt's undefeated season.

The starting lineup was: Bomar (left end), Bradford (left tackle), Lawrence (left guard), Sharp (center), Kelly (right guard), Morrow (right tackle), Sc. Neill (right end), Kuhn (quarterback), Neely (left halfback), Reese (right halfback), and Wakefield (fullback).

== After the season ==
The 1922 season was among the best in Vanderbilt and in Southern football history. Many publications listed Vanderbilt's season as best in the South. Among sportswriters, Georgia Tech seemed the only challenger for the mythical Southern crown, though the 1922 SoCon championship was officially a tie between Vanderbilt, Georgia Tech, and North Carolina. The Commodores therefore shared a conference title for the second year in a row, having tied with Georgia Bulldogs for the SIAA championship in 1921. Vanderbilt's defense was universally acknowledged as the best in the South. One sports editor wrote: "Vanderbilt has a defensive system any coach would give his right eye to possess." Vanderbilt's defense held Michigan, Tennessee, Georgia, and Texas when all were within three yards (2.7 m) of the goal.

Coach Dan McGugin's record in intersectional matchups started to attract attention. He had beaten the Carlisle Indians 4–0 in 1906, tied Navy on the road in 1907, tied with Yale on the road in 1910, lost a close fight with Harvard 9–3 in 1912; to which could be added the 1922 scoreless tie with Michigan. The next year the Commodores were again scheduled to play Michigan and Texas. Both matches were to be away games, while the rest of the schedule would be played at home. At the annual football banquet on December 5, quarterback Doc Kuhn was elected captain of the Commodore squad for 1923.

=== Awards and honors ===
Lynn Bomar received first team All-American honors from Frank G. Menke. He was also selected as a second team All-American by Walter Camp, a third team All-American by Walter Eckersall, and appears on Billy Evans' National Honor Roll. Bomar was one of the first Southern players to make Camp's team. Grantland Rice wrote the next year, "there was no better end in the country last fall." Jess Neely, Doc Kuhn, and Scotty Neill got Camp's honorable mention. Bomar was one of two consensus All-Southern selections; the other was Red Barron of Georgia Tech. Kuhn appeared on Billy Evans' National Honor Roll, and was the second quarterback after Herb Covington of Centre to be selected for Evans' Southern Honor Roll. Scotty Neill appeared on Evans's Southern Honor Roll, the All-Southern team of Zipp Newman, sports editor for The Birmingham News, and on the second team of All-Southerns chosen by Homer George, sports editor for The Atlanta Constitution. Gil Reese also appeared on Evans' Southern Honor Roll and on George's second team. Other Commodores on Evans' Southern Honor Roll were Tex Bradford and Tuck Kelly. T. H. Alexander selected the entire Vanderbilt eleven as his All-Southern team.

=== Coaching changes ===
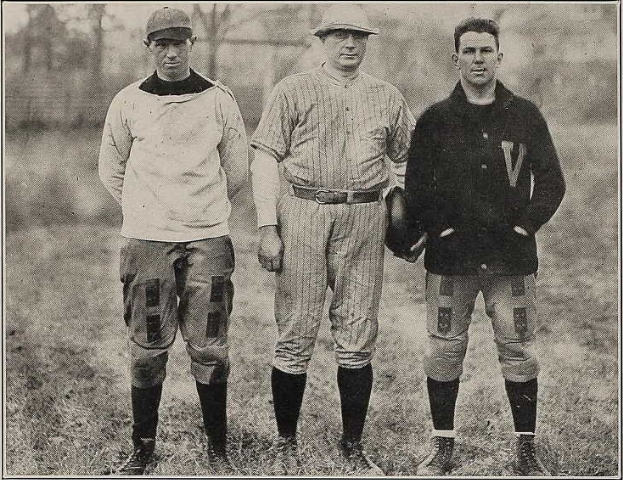
Coaches Wade, McGugin, and Hardage

Assistant coach Wallace Wade left the Vanderbilt football team for the head coaching position at Alabama, where he had much success establishing Alabama's dynasty. He was first pursued by the University of Kentucky, but refused that option because he felt they had kept him too late with a committee hearing. Dan McGugin was first pursued by Alabama but felt content with Vanderbilt and recommended Wade for the position. In his eight years at Alabama, Wade went 61–13–3 with the school's first three national titles, and had the first Southern team to play in a Rose Bowl. His replacement at Vanderbilt was Josh Cody, Mercer Bears coach and former Vanderbilt player.

== Personnel ==
=== Coaching staff ===
- Dan McGugin (Michigan '03), head coach
- Wallace Wade (Brown '16), line coach
- Lewie Hardage (Vanderbilt '12), backfield coach
- Tom Zerfoss (Vanderbilt '19), assistant and freshman coach.
- Joe Killebrew, manager

=== Varsity letterwinners ===
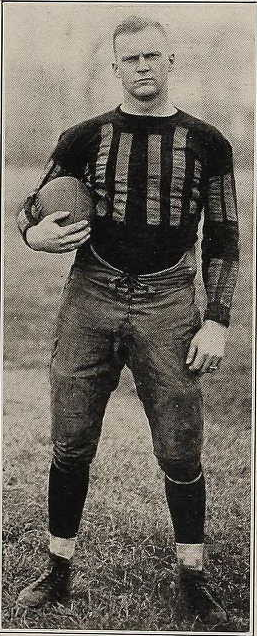
Lynn Bomar, 'The Blonde Bear'

==== Line ====
Number	Player	Position	Games started	Hometown	Prep school	Height	Weight	Age
7	Lynn Bomar	End; Tackle	4; 3	Gallatin, Tennessee	Fitzgerald and Clarke School	6'1"	198	21
21	Tex Bradford	Tackle	7	Mansfield, Texas	Texas Christian University	6'0"	200	23
18	Percy Conyers	End	1	Halls, Tennessee	Union Academy		151	
13	Tuck Kelly	Guard	7	Whitesville, Kentucky	University of Kentucky	6'0"	170	24
19	Fatty Lawrence	Guard	4	Nashville, Tennessee	Hume-Fogg H.S.	5'7"	190	19
22	Tot McCullough	End	4	Lewisburg, Tennessee		6'4"	190	27
23	Garland Morrow	Guard	6	Nashville, Tennessee	Hume-Fogg H.S.		175	24
20	Scotty Neill	End	8	Birmingham, Alabama	Birmingham–Southern College		168	26
3	Alfred Sharp	Center	7	Nashville, Tennessee	Hume-Fogg H.S.	6'4"	189	20
12	Jim Walker	Tackle; Guard	5; 1	Birmingham, Alabama			190	

==== Backfield ====
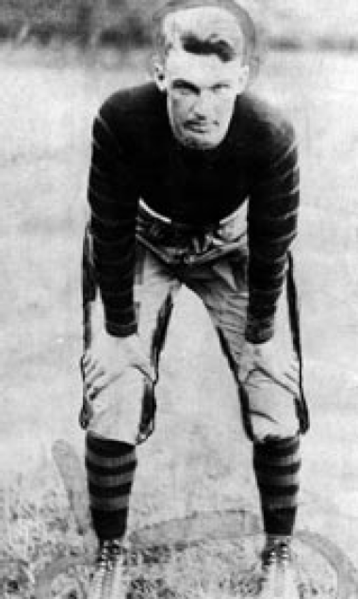
Captain Jess Neely

Number	Player	Position	Games started	Hometown	Prep school	Height	Weight	Age
2	Doc Kuhn	Quarterback	8	Nashville, Tennessee	Montgomery Bell Academy	5'8"	150	24
6	Freddie Meiers	Halfback	6	Nashville, Tennessee	Georgia Military Academy (GA)		150	
1	Jess Neely	Halfback	6	Smyrna, Tennessee	Branham and Hughes Military Academy		158	24
11	Gil Reese	Halfback	8	Tupelo, Mississippi	Tupelo H.S.		155	21
17	Red Rountree	Halfback	3	Hartselle, Alabama	Morgan County H.S.		145	19
16	Hek Wakefield	Fullback	6	Petersburg, Tennessee	Fitzgerald and Clarke School	5'10"	155	23

=== Subs ===
==== Line ====
Number	Player	Position	Games started	Hometown	Prep school	Height	Weight	Age
	Bill Bryan	End						
	Paul Lindsay	Guard						
15	Sam Neill	Guard						
9	Perry Orr	Tackle						
14	William E. Porter	Center						

==== Backfield ====
Number	Player	Position	Games started	Hometown	Prep school	Height	Weight	Age
4	Alvin 'Pep' Bell	Quarterback		Little Rock, Arkansas	Little Rock H. S.		150	21
24	Manning Brown	Fullback						
5	Hugh Mixon	Halfback		Marianna, Arkansas	Polytechnic H.S. (California)		160	
8	S. T. Porter	Fullback			Peabody Academy			
	John Thomas	Halfback						
	George Waller	Halfback						
	John Whorley	Halfback						

=== Scoring leaders ===
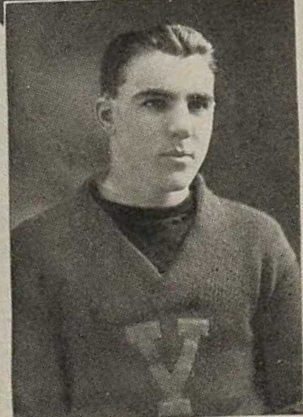
Fullback Hek Wakefield

Player	Touchdowns	Extra points	Field goals	Points
Gil Reese	7	0	0	42
Lynn Bomar	5	0	0	30
Jess Neely	3	0	0	18
Freddie Meiers	3	0	0	18
Red Rountree	3	0	0	18
Doc Kuhn	2	0	0	12
Hek Wakefield	0	9	1	12
S. T. Porter	1	1	0	7
Scotty Neill	1	0	0	6
Fatty Lawrence	1	0	0	6
Tot McCullough	1	0	0	6
Hugh Mixon	0	2	0	2
Total	27	12	1	177

=== Depth chart ===
The following chart provides a visual depiction of Vanderbilt's lineup during the 1922 season with games started at the position reflected in parentheses. The chart mimics a short punt formation while on offense, with the quarterback under center.

LE
Lynn Bomar (4)
Tot McCullough (3)
Bill Bryan (1)

LT	LG	C	RG	RT
Tex Bradford (6)	Garland Morrow (5)	Alfred Sharp (8)	Tuck Kelly (8)	Jim Walker (4)
Lynn Bomar (3)	Fatty Lawrence (2)	William E. Porter (0)	Fatty Lawrence (1)	Fatty Lawrence (2)
	Perry Orr (1)		Paul Lindsay (0)	Garland Morrow (2)
	Jim Walker (1)		Sam Neill (0)	Tex Bradford (1)

RE
Scotty Neill (8)
Percy Conyers (1)

QB
Doc Kuhn (8)
Red Rountree (1)
Pep Bell (0)

LHB	RHB
Jess Neely (4)	Gil Reese (4)
Gil Reese (2)	Jess Neely (4)
Hek Wakefield (2)	Froggie Meiers (1)
Froggie Meiers (1)	Red Rountree (1)
Hugh Mixon (1)	George Waller (0)
John Whorley (0)	John Thomas (0)

FB
Hek Wakefield (6)
S. T. Porter (3)
Manning Brown (0)

-

== Bibliography ==
- Baker, Louis Henry (1945). Football:Facts and Figures.
- Hawthorne, Bobby (2007). Longhorn Football: An Illustrated History. Austin: University of Texas. ISBN 9780292714465.
- Noel, Tex (2011). Stars of an Earlier Autumn An Unofficial College Football Records Book. iUniverse. ISBN 9781462053063.
- Perrin, Tom (1987). Football: a college history. McFarland & Company Incorporated Pub. ISBN 9780899502946. "lynn bomar ."
- Pittard, Homer. The First Fifty Years: A History of Middle Tennessee State College.
- Pope, Edwin (1955). Football's Greatest Coaches. Atlanta: Tupper and Love.
- Russell, Fred (1938). Fifty Years of Vanderbilt Football. Nashville, Tennessee.
- Scott, Richard (2008). SEC Football: 75 Years of Pride and Passion. Minneapolis. ISBN 9781616731335.
- University of Tennessee (1923). The Volunteer Yearbook. Archived from the original on August 19, 2014.
- Traughber, Bill (2010). Nashville Sports History: Stories from the Stands.
- Traughber, Bill (2011). Vanderbilt Football: Tales of Commodore Gridiron History. The History Press. ISBN 978-1-60949-423-0.
- Vanderbilt University (1922). The Commodore.
- Vanderbilt University (1923). The Commodore.
- Vanderbilt University (2012). Vanderbilt Football Fact Book.
- Walsh, Christopher J. (2006). Where Football Is King: A History of the SEC. Taylor Trade. ISBN 9781461734772.
- Whittingham, Richard (2001). Rites of Autumn: The Story of College Football.
- Wilder, Robert E. (1982). Gridiron Glory Days: Football at Mercer, 1892–1942. Macon, Georgia. ISBN 9780881462678.
- Woodruff, Fuzzy (1928). A History of Southern Football 1890–1928. Vol. 2.
