= Athletics at the 1912 Summer Olympics – Men's 110 metres hurdles =

Men's 110 metres hurdles at the Games of the V Olympiad
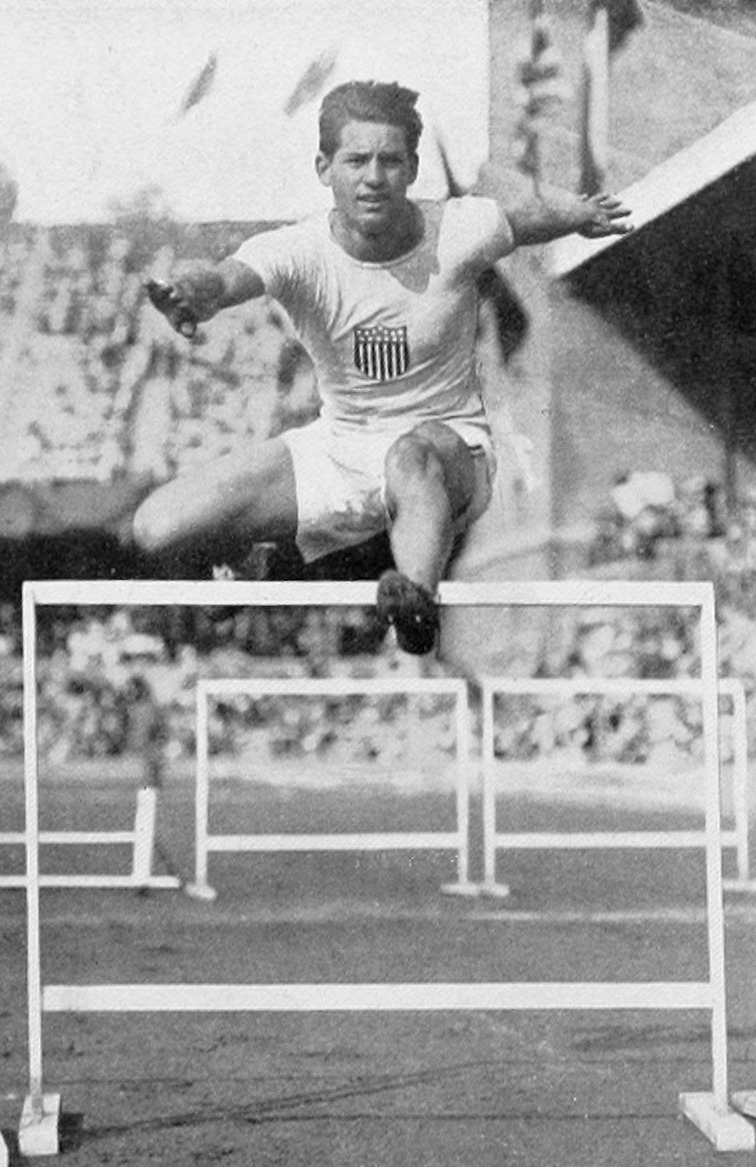
- The winner, Fred Kelly.
- Venue: Stockholm Olympic Stadium
- Dates: July 11, 1912 (heats, semifinals); July 12, 1912 (final)
- Competitors: 22 from 10 nations
- Winning time: 15.1

Medalists
1st place, gold medalist(s)		Fred Kelly; United States
2nd place, silver medalist(s)		James Wendell; United States
3rd place, bronze medalist(s)		Martin Hawkins; United States

The men's 110 metres hurdles was a track and field athletics event held as part of the Athletics at the 1912 Summer Olympics programme. The competition was held on Thursday, July 11, 1912, and on Friday, July 12, 1912. 22 hurdlers from 10 nations competed. NOCs could enter up to 12 athletes. The event was won by Fred Kelly of the United States, the fifth of five consecutive victories for the nation in the first five Olympic Games. It was also the fourth of four consecutive podium sweeps for the Americans in the event.

== Background ==
This was the fifth appearance of the event, which is one of 12 athletics events to have been held at every Summer Olympics. None of the finalists from 1908 returned. The American hurdles were favored, with Fred Kelly, John Case, and Vaughn Blanchard the Olympic trial winners.

Chile, Finland, and Italy each made their first appearance in the event. The United States made its fifth appearance, the only nation to have competed in the 110 metres hurdles in each Games to that point.

== Competition format ==
As in 1908, there were three rounds. The first round consisted of 11 heats, many of which had only one or two hurdlers and none of which had more than three. The top two hurdlers in each heat advanced to the semifinals, resulting in only two men being eliminated in the first round. The 22 semifinalists were divided into six semifinals of 3 or 4 runners each; only the top hurdler in each advanced to the 6-man final.

== Records ==
The records for the 110 metre hurdles coming into 1912 were 15.0 seconds, which were not matched during the 1912 Games.

World record	Forrest Smithson (USA)	15.0	London, United Kingdom	25 July 1908
Olympic record	Forrest Smithson (USA)	15.0	London, United Kingdom	25 July 1908

== Schedule ==
Date	Time	Round
Thursday, 11 July 1912	9:30; 16:15	Round 1 Semifinals
Friday, 12 July 1912	15:00	Final

== Results ==
=== Heats ===
All heats were held on Thursday, July 11, 1912.

Only two hurdlers were eliminated after the heats.

==== Heat 1 ====
Rank	Athlete	Nation	Time	Notes
1	George Chisholm	United States	15.4	Q
2	Károly Solymár	Hungary	15.8	Q

==== Heat 2 ====
Rank	Athlete	Nation	Time	Notes
1	John Eller	United States	16.0	Q
2	Gerard Anderson	Great Britain	18.6	Q

==== Heat 3 ====
Rank	Athlete	Nation	Time	Notes
1	Martin Hawkins	United States	16.1	Q
2	Géo André	France	16.8	Q

==== Heat 4 ====
Rank	Athlete	Nation	Time	Notes
1	Ferdinand Bie	Norway	16.2	Q
2	Valdemar Wickholm	Finland	16.6	Q

==== Heat 5 ====
Rank	Athlete	Nation	Time	Notes
1	Pablo Eitel	Chile	17.2	Q

==== Heat 6 ====
Rank	Athlete	Nation	Time	Notes
1	Marius Delaby	France	16.0	Q
2	Vaughn Blanchard	United States	16.0	Q
3	Alfredo Pagani	Italy	Unknown	

==== Heat 7 ====
Rank	Athlete	Nation	Time	Notes
1	Edwin Pritchard	United States	16.4	Q
2	Henry Blakeney	Great Britain	17.4	Q

==== Heat 8 ====
Rank	Athlete	Nation	Time	Notes
1	John Nicholson	United States	15.5	Q
2	Daciano Colbacchini	Italy	16.1	Q

==== Heat 9 ====
Rank	Athlete	Nation	Time	Notes
1	Fred Kelly	United States	16.4	Q

==== Heat 10 ====
Rank	Athlete	Nation	Time	Notes
1	John Case	United States	16.3	Q
2	Hermann von Bönninghausen	Germany	17.0	Q

==== Heat 11 ====
Rank	Athlete	Nation	Time	Notes
1	Kenneth Powell	Great Britain	15.6	Q
2	James Wendell	United States	15.7	Q
3	Frank Lukeman	Canada	Unknown	

=== Semifinals ===
All semifinals were held on Thursday, July 11, 1912.

==== Semifinal 1 ====
Rank	Athlete	Nation	Time	Notes
1	Kenneth Powell	Great Britain	15.6	Q
2	John Eller	United States	15.7	
3	Ferdinand Bie	Norway	15.8	
4	Pablo Eitel	Chile	Unknown	

==== Semifinal 2 ====
Rank	Athlete	Nation	Time	Notes
1	Martin Hawkins	United States	15.7	Q
2	Daciano Colbacchini	Italy	16.0	
3	Marius Delaby	France	16.2	
—	Károly Solymár	Hungary	DNF	

==== Semifinal 3 ====
Rank	Athlete	Nation	Time	Notes
1	John Nicholson	United States	15.4	Q
2	Vaughn Blanchard	United States	15.7	
3	Hermann von Bönninghausen	Germany	16.0	

==== Semifinal 4 ====
Rank	Athlete	Nation	Time	Notes
1	James Wendell	United States	15.5	Q
2	George Chisholm	United States	15.7	
—	Gerard Anderson	Great Britain	DNF	

==== Semifinal 5 ====
Rank	Athlete	Nation	Time	Notes
1	Fred Kelly	United States	15.6	Q
2	Valdemar Wickholm	Finland	16.6	
3	Henry Blakeney	Great Britain	Unknown	

==== Semifinal 6 ====
Rank	Athlete	Nation	Time	Notes
1	John Case	United States	15.6	Q
2	Edwin Pritchard	United States	15.6	
3	Géo André	France	Unknown	

=== Final ===
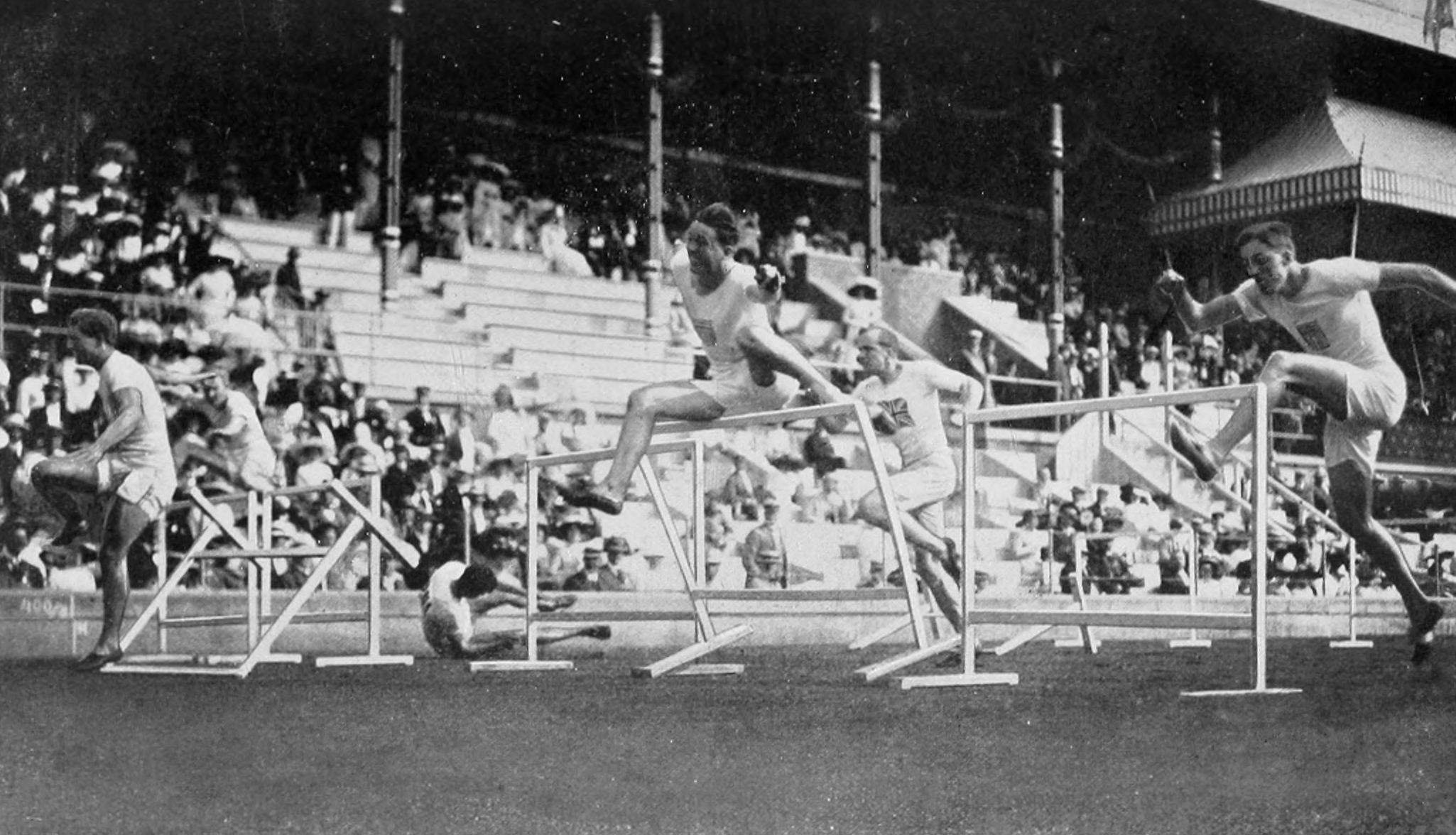
The final where John Nicholson fell and did not finish the race.

The final was held on Friday, July 12, 1912. Nicholson fell at the eighth hurdle, leaving Kelly to hold on and win by a narrow margin over Wendell.

Rank	Athlete	Nation	Time
1	Fred Kelly	United States	15.1
2	James Wendell	United States	15.2
3	Martin Hawkins	United States	15.3
4	John Case	United States	15.3
5	Kenneth Powell	Great Britain	15.5
—	John Nicholson	United States	DNF

== Notes ==
- Bergvall, Erik, ed. (1913). The Official Report of the Olympic Games of Stockholm 1912. Translated by Adams-Ray, Edward. Stockholm: Wahlström & Widstrand.
- Wudarski, Pawel (1999). "Wyniki Igrzysk Olimpijskich" (in Polish).
