= Walter B. Rountree =

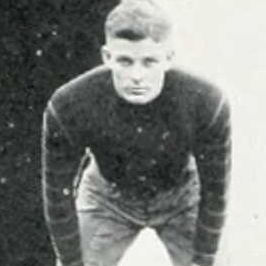
- Born: May 31, 1903; Hartselle, Alabama, U.S.
- Died: April 1980 (aged 76)
- Occupation: Physician
- Football career

No. 17; 8
- Position: Halfback

Personal information
- Listed weight: 145 lb (66 kg)

Career information
- High school: Morgan County
- College: Vanderbilt (1920–1923)

Awards and highlights
- SIAA championship (1921); SoCon championship (1922, 1923)

Walter Boyce "Red" Rountree (May 31, 1903 – April, 1980) was a physician in Birmingham, Alabama. Rountree played college football and was a prominent halfback for coach Dan McGugin's Vanderbilt Commodores football team from 1920 to 1923. In 1922, Rountree played quarterback in the game against Mercer and was the star. In 1923, Rountree ran for a 63-yard touchdown in the 51–7 victory over the rival Tennessee Volunteers.
