= James Wendell =

American hurdler (1890–1958)

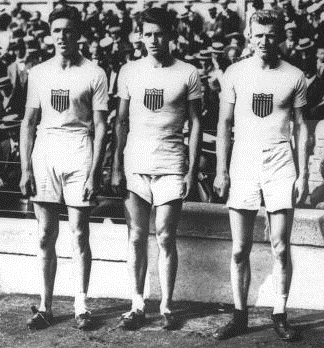
- Fred Kelly, James Wendell and Martin Hawkins at the 1912 Olympics

Personal information
- Born: September 3, 1890 Schenectady, United States
- Died: November 22, 1958 (aged 68) Philadelphia, United States
- Height: 1.83 m (6 ft 0 in)
- Weight: 79 kg (174 lb)

Sport
- Sport: Hurdles running
- Club: NYAC, New York
Medal record
Representing the United States
Olympic Games
Silver medal – second place	1912 Stockholm	110 metre hurdles

James Isaac Wendell (September 3, 1890 – November 22, 1958) was an American athlete who won the silver medal competed in the 110 m hurdles at the 1912 Summer Olympics.

After retiring from competitions, Wendell had a successful career in education. He was a master of English and assistant track coach at The Hill School (1913–1928), a boarding school in Pottstown, Pennsylvania, where he was subsequently named headmaster (1928–1952). A teammate of his on the 1912 Olympic Team, General George S. Patton, later sent his son to The Hill while Wendell was headmaster. During Wendell's tenure as headmaster, Hill graduate William ("Bill") Franklin Porter II, class of 1944, won a gold medal in the 110-meters hurdles at the 1948 Summer Olympics.

In 2008, Wendell was named to Wesleyan University's Athletic Hall of Fame. He graduated from the school in 1913 and broke several track and field records during his time there.
