= John Nicholson (hurdler) =

American track and field athlete (1889–1940)

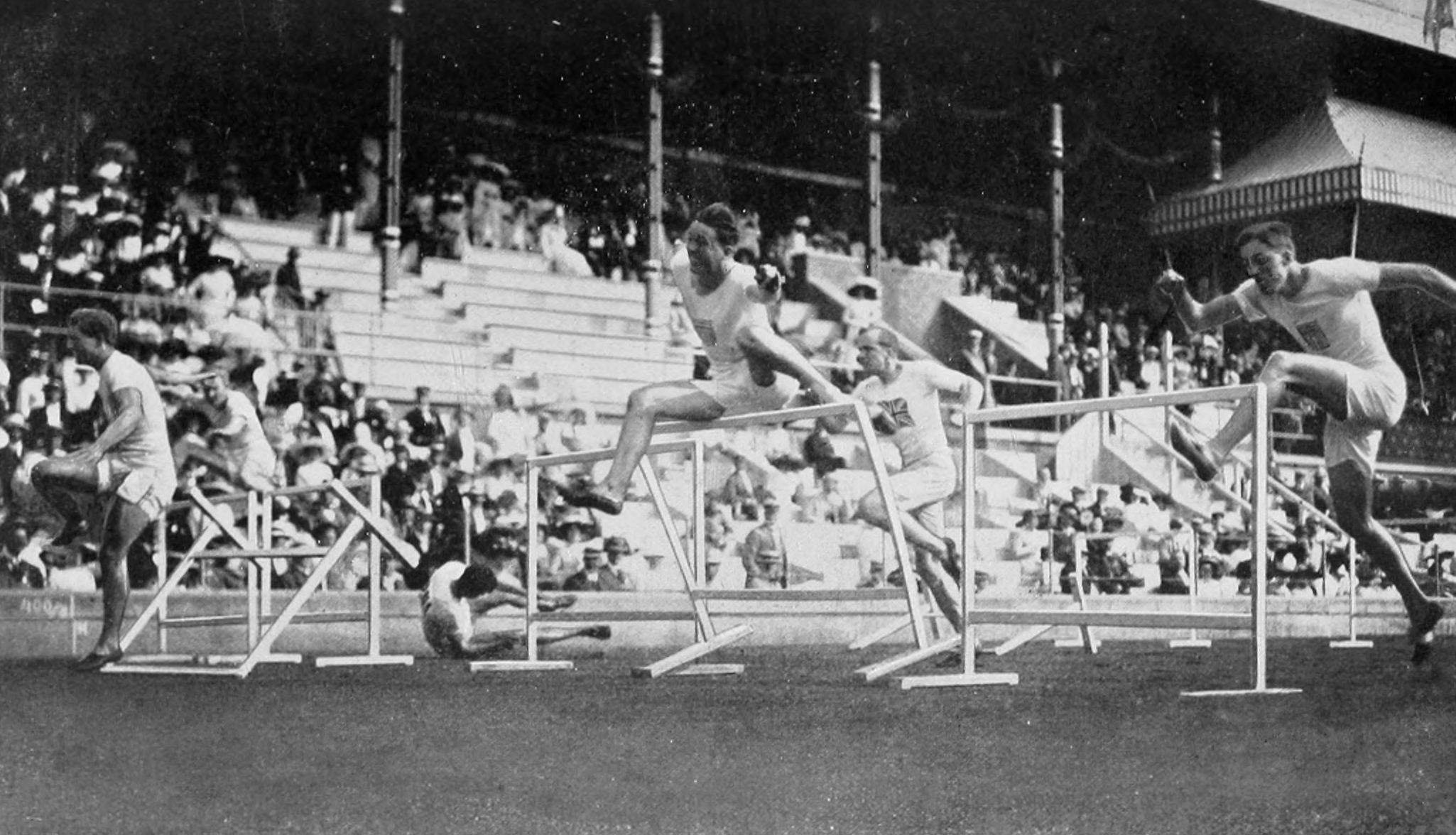
- The 1912 Olympics final where John Nicholson fell and did not finish the race

Personal information
- Born: July 30, 1889 Greenville, Pennsylvania, U.S.
- Died: April 2, 1940 (aged 50) South Bend, Indiana, U.S.
- Height: 1.83 m (6 ft 0 in)
- Weight: 75 kg (165 lb)

Sport
- Sport: Hurdles, high jump, triple jump, high jump, pole vault
- Club: University of Missouri

John Patrick Nicholson (July 30, 1889 – April 2, 1940) was an American track and field athlete who competed in the 1912 Summer Olympics. He ran in the final of the 110 meter hurdles competition but fell and did not finish the race. He also participated in the high jump event but was not able to clear a height.

After finishing his athletics career, Nicholson went on to become a track coach. He coached at DePauw University, Sewanee: The University of the South, Rice University, and the University of Notre Dame. He died suddenly on April 2, 1940.

== Head coaching record ==
=== Football ===
Year	Team	Overall	Conference	Standing	Bowl/playoffs
Sewanee Tigers (Southern Intercollegiate Athletic Association) (1921–1922)
1921	Sewanee	6–2	4–2	7th	
1922	Sewanee	3–4–1	1–1	T–8th	
Sewanee:		9–6–1	5–3		
Total:		9–6–1			
