= Fred Kelly (hurdler) =

American hurdler

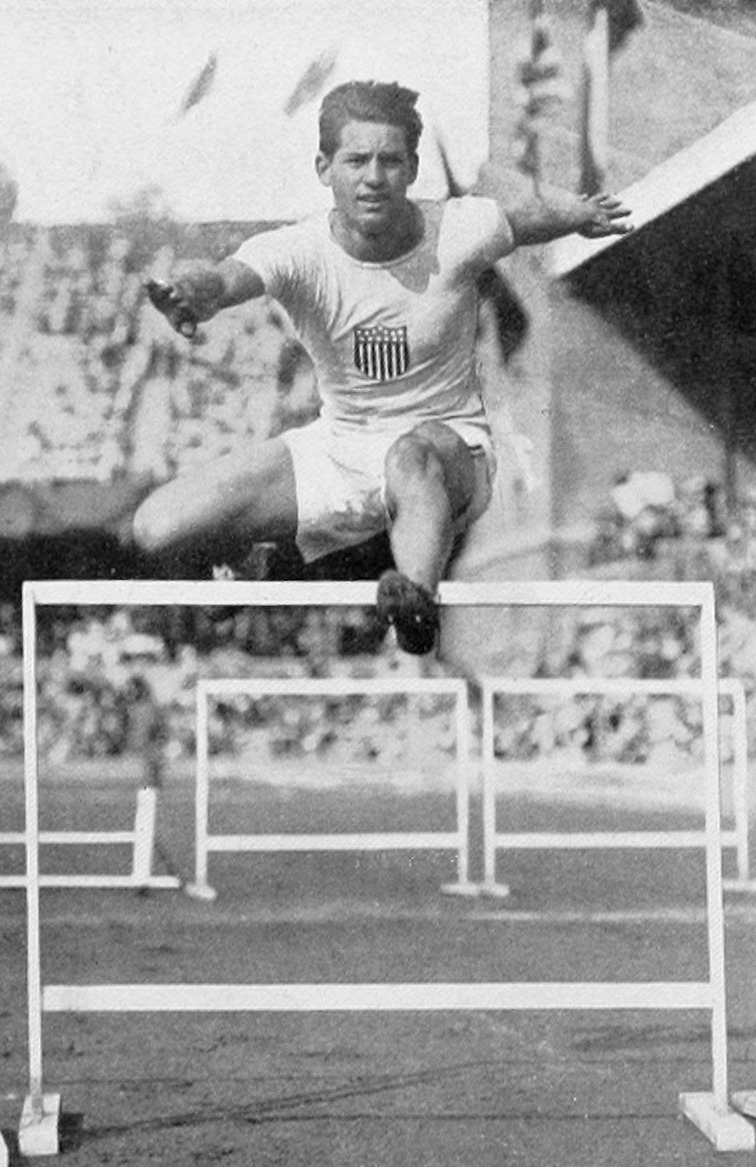
- Fred Kelly at the 1912 Olympics

Personal information
- Born: September 12, 1891 Beaumont, California, United States
- Died: May 7, 1974 (aged 82) Medford, Oregon, United States
- Height: 1.82 m (6 ft 0 in)
- Weight: 72 kg (159 lb)

Sport
- Sport: Hurdle running
- Club: USC Trojans, Los Angeles
Medal record
Representing the United States
Olympic Games
Gold medal – first place	1912 Stockholm	110 m hurdles

Frederick Warren Kelly (September 12, 1891 – May 7, 1974) was an American athlete, winner of 110 m hurdles at the 1912 Summer Olympics.

Born in Beaumont, California, Fred Kelly attended Orange High School. He was a freshman at University of Southern California when he was selected to the US 1912 Olympic team.

At Stockholm, Kelly won his preliminary heats easily and qualified to the final with four more Americans and one representative from Great Britain. From the start, the five Americans ran even until the eighth hurdle, where Kelly and James Wendell spun ahead to decide the winner. Kelly got in front the instant before the tape was broken to win by 0.1 seconds. He also competed for the US in an exhibition baseball tournament in Stockholm.

Kelly was the AAU Champion in 120 yd (110 m) hurdles in 1913 and finished second in 1916 and 1919. Kelly also finished first at the 1915 AAU Championships but was disqualified for knocking down four hurdles.

Kelly served in the United States Army in World War I and later became a pioneering aviator, carrying mail for Western Air Express and training Army pilots during World War II.

Beginning on March 19, 1949, he served as the first President of the SoCal Olympians and Paralympians.

Fred Kelly died in Medford, Oregon, aged 82.

A stadium near where he attended Orange High School in Orange, California has been named after him, Fred Kelly Stadium, which is located next to El Modena High School.
