= Károly Solymár =

Hungarian hurdler

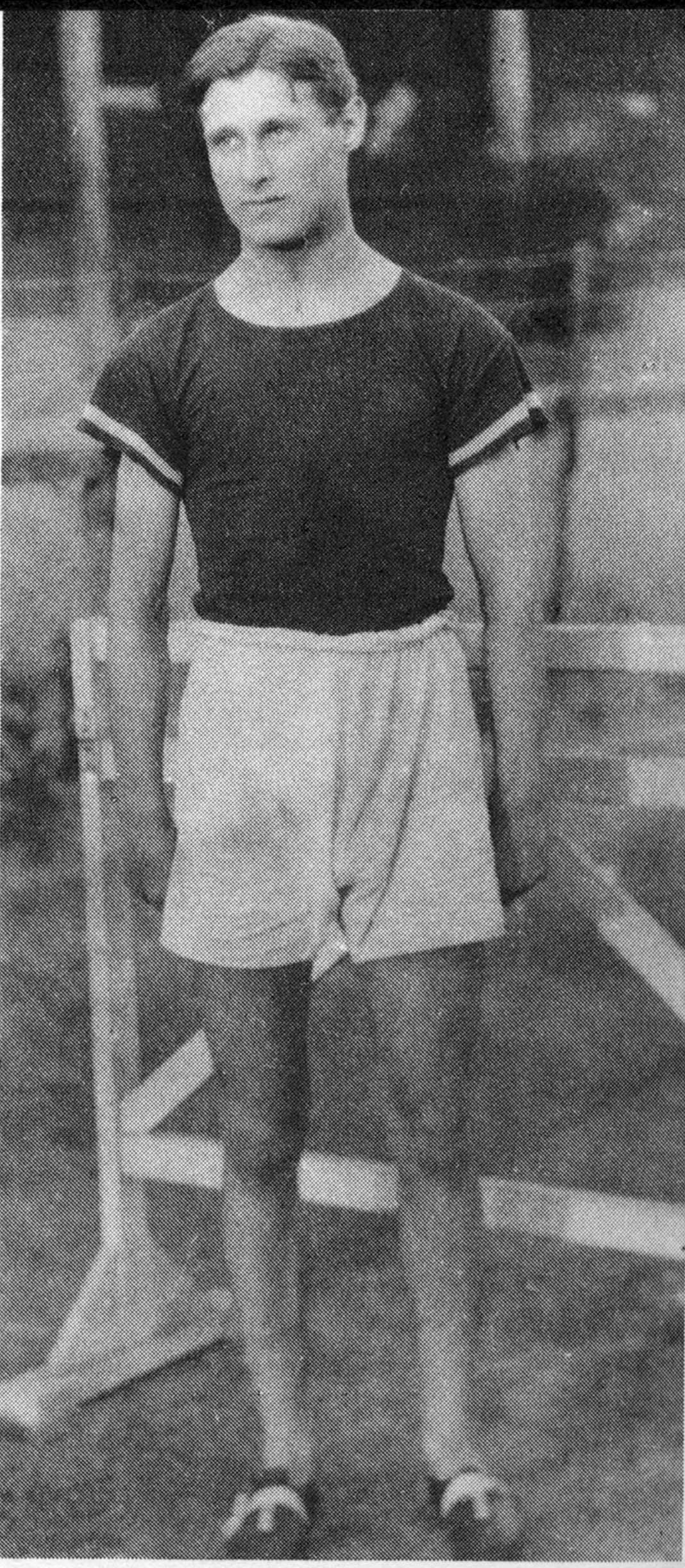

Personal information
- Nationality: Hungarian
- Born: 23 December 1894
- Died: 15 December 1945 (aged 50)

Sport
- Sport: Track and field
- Event: 110 metres hurdles

Károly Solymár (23 December 1894 – 15 December 1945) was a Hungarian hurdler. He competed in the men's 110 metres hurdles at the 1912 Summer Olympics.
