= 1922 Chattanooga Moccasins football team =

American college football season

1922 Chattanooga Moccasins football
- Conference: Southern Intercollegiate Athletic Association
- Record: 6–2–1 (3–1 SIAA)
- Head coach: Bill McAllester (1st season)
- Captain: Ed Sussdorf
- Home stadium: Chamberlain Field

1922 Southern Intercollegiate Athletic Association football standings
	Conf.					Overall
Team	W		L		T	W		L		T
Furman $	3	–	0	–	0	8	–	3	–	0
Vanderbilt*	2	–	0	–	0	8	–	0	–	1
Presbyterian	2	–	0	–	0	6	–	2	–	1
Mississippi College	2	–	0	–	0	6	–	3	–	0
Centre	1	–	0	–	0	8	–	2	–	0
Georgetown (KY)	1	–	0	–	0	1	–	1	–	0
Chattanooga	3	–	1	–	0	6	–	2	–	1
Western Kentucky	1	–	1	–	0	9	–	1	–	0
Sewanee	1	–	1	–	0	3	–	4	–	1
Millsaps	1	–	1	–	0	1	–	1	–	0
Mercer	1	–	2	–	0	4	–	6	–	0
Transylvania	0	–	1	–	0	0	–	1	–	0
The Citadel	0	–	2	–	0	3	–	5	–	0
Howard (AL)	0	–	2	–	0	2	–	6	–	2
Louisville	0	–	2	–	0	2	–	7	–	0
Wofford	0	–	2	–	0	2	–	7	–	0
Oglethorpe	0	–	4	–	0	1	–	9	–	0
$ – Conference champion; * – co-member of SoCon

The 1922 Chattanooga Moccasins football team represented the University of Chattanooga, located in the American city of Chattanooga, Tennessee and today known as the University of Tennessee at Chattanooga, in the sport of gridiron football for the 1922 college football season. The team was a member of the Southern Intercollegiate Athletic Association and completed its 9-game schedule with a record of 6 wins, 2 losses, and 1 tie. It was led by head coach Bill McAllester, in his first season at the helm of the Moccasins.

== Schedule ==
Date	Opponent	Site	Result	Attendance	Source
September 29	Bryson College*	Chamberlain Field; Chattanooga, TN	W 40–0		
October 7	Cumberland (TN)*	Chamberlain Field; Chattanooga, TN	W 40–0		
October 14	Emory and Henry*	Chamberlain Field; Chattanooga, TN	W 56–0		
October 21	Birmingham–Southern*	Chamberlain Field; Chattanooga, TN	T 0–0		
October 28	Transylvania	Chamberlain Field; Chattanooga, TN	W 40–6		
November 4	at Tennessee Docs*	Russwood Park; Memphis, TN	L 0–19	3,500	
November 11	Mercer	Chamberlain Field; Chattanooga, TN	W 13–6		
November 18	at Georgetown (KY)	Hinton Field; Georgetown, KY	L 0–20		
November 30	Oglethorpe	Chamberlain Field; Chattanooga, TN	W 13–9		
*Non-conference game
