= 1922 Centre Praying Colonels football team =

American college football season

1922 Centre Praying Colonels football
- Conference: Southern Intercollegiate Athletic Association
- Record: 8–2 (1–0 SIAA)
- Head coach: Charley Moran (6th season)
- Offensive scheme: Single-wing
- Home stadium: Cheek Field

Uniform
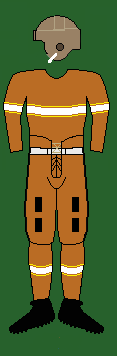

1922 Southern Intercollegiate Athletic Association football standings
	Conf.					Overall
Team	W		L		T	W		L		T
Furman $	3	–	0	–	0	8	–	3	–	0
Vanderbilt*	2	–	0	–	0	8	–	0	–	1
Presbyterian	2	–	0	–	0	6	–	2	–	1
Mississippi College	2	–	0	–	0	6	–	3	–	0
Centre	1	–	0	–	0	8	–	2	–	0
Georgetown (KY)	1	–	0	–	0	1	–	1	–	0
Chattanooga	3	–	1	–	0	6	–	2	–	1
Western Kentucky	1	–	1	–	0	9	–	1	–	0
Sewanee	1	–	1	–	0	3	–	4	–	1
Millsaps	1	–	1	–	0	1	–	1	–	0
Mercer	1	–	2	–	0	4	–	6	–	0
Transylvania	0	–	1	–	0	0	–	1	–	0
The Citadel	0	–	2	–	0	3	–	5	–	0
Howard (AL)	0	–	2	–	0	2	–	6	–	2
Louisville	0	–	2	–	0	2	–	7	–	0
Wofford	0	–	2	–	0	2	–	7	–	0
Oglethorpe	0	–	4	–	0	1	–	9	–	0
$ – Conference champion; * – co-member of SoCon

The 1922 Centre Praying Colonels football team represented Centre College in the 1922 college football season. The Praying Colonels scored 296 points while allowing 52 points and finished 8–2 The season featured handing V. P. I its only loss of the season, and a big upset in the South when the Colonels lost to the Auburn Tigers.

James "Red" Roberts (at both end and tackle), Ed Kubale (center) and Herb Covington (quarterback) were named to the 1922 College Football All-America Team.

== Schedule ==
Date	Opponent	Site	Result	Attendance	Source
September 23	Carson–Newman*	Cheek Field; Danville, KY	W 72–0		
September 30	at Clemson*	Riggs Field; Calhoun, SC	W 21–0		
October 7	Ole Miss*	Cheek Field; Danville, KY	W 55–0		
October 14	vs. VPI*	Mayo Island Park; Richmond, VA	W 10–6	12,500	
October 21	at Harvard*	Harvard Stadium; Boston, MA	L 10–24	50,000	
October 28	Louisville	Cheek Field; Danville, KY	W 32–7		
November 4	at Kentucky*	Stoll Field; Lexington, KY (rivalry)	W 27–3		
November 11	vs. Washington and Lee*	Eclipse Park; Louisville, KY	W 27–6		
November 18	at Auburn*	Rickwood Field; Birmingham, AL	L 0–6		
November 30	South Carolina*	Cheek Field; Danville, KY	W 42–0		
*Non-conference game
