= Carl Prause =

American football coach and college athletics administrator

Biographical details
- Born: October 5, 1893; South Carolina, U.S.
- Died: March 26, 1970 (aged 76); Charleston, South Carolina, U.S.

Coaching career (HC unless noted)
- 1922–1929: The Citadel

Administrative career (AD unless noted)
- 1922–1929: The Citadel

Head coaching record
- Overall: 41–32–4

Carl William Prause (October 5, 1893 – March 26, 1970) was an American football coach and college athletics administrator. He served as a second lieutenant in the 118th Infantry 30th Division in the United States Army during World War I and was awarded the Distinguished Service Cross. He was the seventh head football coach at The Citadel, serving for eight seasons, from 1922 to 1929, and compiling a record of 41–32–4. He died at a Charleston hospital in 1970.

== Head coaching record ==
Year	Team	Overall	Conference	Standing	Bowl/playoffs
The Citadel Bulldogs (Southern Intercollegiate Athletic Association) (1922–1929)
1922	The Citadel	3–5	1–2		
1923	The Citadel	5–3–1	2–1–1		
1924	The Citadel	6–4	4–2		
1925	The Citadel	6–4	5–2	7th	
1926	The Citadel	7–3	5–3	13th	
1927	The Citadel	3–6–1	2–3–1		
1928	The Citadel	6–3–1	4–3	12th	
1929	The Citadel	5–4–1	4–0–1		
The Citadel:		41–32–4	27–16–3		
Total:		41–32–4			
