= Hermann von Bönninghausen =

German athlete (1888–1919)

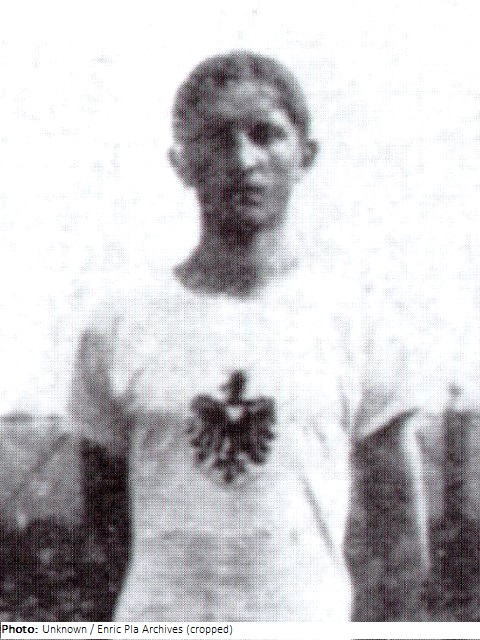
- Born: 24 July 1888; Bocholt, Kingdom of Prussia, German Empire
- Died: 26 January 1919 (aged 30)
- Sports career
- Country: Kingdom of Prussia
- Sport: Track and field Football
- Events: 100 metres, long jump

Sports achievements and titles
- Olympic finals: 2
- Military career
- Allegiance: Kingdom of Prussia
- Conflicts: World War I

Hermann von Bönninghausen (24 July 1888 – 26 January 1919) was a German athlete who competed at the 1908 Summer Olympics and in the 1912 Summer Olympics. He died after World War I due to injury by being shot in the face.

== Biography ==
Von Bönninghausen was born in Bocholt. In the 100 metres event at the 1908 Summer Games, he took fifth place in his first round heat with a time of 12.0 seconds. He did not advance to the semifinals. He also participated in the long jump competition, but his final ranking is unknown.

Four years later, he was eliminated in the semi-finals of the 110-metre hurdles event.

== See also ==
- List of Olympians killed in World War I
