= George Chisholm (hurdler) =

American hurdler

George Alpin Chisholm (December 2, 1887 – January 20, 1920) was an American track and field athlete who competed in the 1912 Summer Olympics. He was born in Attleboro, Massachusetts. In 1912, he was eliminated in the semi-finals of the 110 metre hurdles competition.
