= John Case (hurdler) =

American hurdler (1889–1975)

John Ruggles Case (March 31, 1889 – January 20, 1975) was an American track and field athlete who competed in the 1912 Summer Olympics. He was born in Evanston, Illinois and died in Oceanside, California. In 1912, he finished fourth in the 110 metre hurdles competition.
