= 1922 Mississippi College Choctaws football team =

American college football season

1922 Mississippi College Choctaws football
- Conference: Southern Intercollegiate Athletic Association
- Record: 6–3 (2–0 SIAA)
- Head coach: Stanley L. Robinson (3rd season)
- Home stadium: Provine Field

1922 Southern Intercollegiate Athletic Association football standings
	Conf.					Overall
Team	W		L		T	W		L		T
Furman $	3	–	0	–	0	8	–	3	–	0
Vanderbilt*	2	–	0	–	0	8	–	0	–	1
Presbyterian	2	–	0	–	0	6	–	2	–	1
Mississippi College	2	–	0	–	0	6	–	3	–	0
Centre	1	–	0	–	0	8	–	2	–	0
Georgetown (KY)	1	–	0	–	0	1	–	1	–	0
Chattanooga	3	–	1	–	0	6	–	2	–	1
Western Kentucky	1	–	1	–	0	9	–	1	–	0
Sewanee	1	–	1	–	0	3	–	4	–	1
Millsaps	1	–	1	–	0	1	–	1	–	0
Mercer	1	–	2	–	0	4	–	6	–	0
Transylvania	0	–	1	–	0	0	–	1	–	0
The Citadel	0	–	2	–	0	3	–	5	–	0
Howard (AL)	0	–	2	–	0	2	–	6	–	2
Louisville	0	–	2	–	0	2	–	7	–	0
Wofford	0	–	2	–	0	2	–	7	–	0
Oglethorpe	0	–	4	–	0	1	–	9	–	0
$ – Conference champion; * – co-member of SoCon

The 1922 Mississippi College Choctaws football team was an American football team that represented Mississippi College as a member of the Southern Intercollegiate Athletic Association (SIAA) in the 1922 college football season. Led by Stanley L. Robinson in his third season as head coach, the team compiled an overall record of 6–3, with a mark of 2–0 against SIAA competition.

== Schedule ==
Date	Opponent	Site	Result	Attendance	Source
September 30	Louisiana College*	Provine Field; Clinton, MS	W 22–0		
October 7	at Tulane*	Tulane Stadium; New Orleans, LA	L 0–30		
October 13	vs. Henderson-Brown*	Athletic Field; Pine Bluff, AR	W 3–0		
October 20	Howard (AL)	State Fairgrounds; Jackson, MS	W 28–0		
October 28	at Baylor*	Cotton Palace; Waco, TX	L 7–40		
November 4	at Millsaps	Athletic Field; Jackson, MS (rivalry)	W 13–6		
November 11	vs. Florida*	Plant Field; Tampa, FL	L 0–58	4,000	
November 18	Birmingham–Southern*	Provine Field; Clinton, MS	W 6–0		
November 25	at Spring Hill*	Monroe Park; Mobile, AL	W 7–6		
*Non-conference game
