= 1922 Oglethorpe Stormy Petrels football team =

American college football season

1922 Oglethorpe Stormy Petrels football
- Conference: Southern Intercollegiate Athletic Association
- Record: 1–9 (0–4 SIAA)
- Head coach: Russ Stein (1st season)
- Captain: Edgar David

1922 Southern Intercollegiate Athletic Association football standings
	Conf.					Overall
Team	W		L		T	W		L		T
Furman $	3	–	0	–	0	8	–	3	–	0
Vanderbilt*	2	–	0	–	0	8	–	0	–	1
Presbyterian	2	–	0	–	0	6	–	2	–	1
Mississippi College	2	–	0	–	0	6	–	3	–	0
Centre	1	–	0	–	0	8	–	2	–	0
Georgetown (KY)	1	–	0	–	0	1	–	1	–	0
Chattanooga	3	–	1	–	0	6	–	2	–	1
Western Kentucky	1	–	1	–	0	9	–	1	–	0
Sewanee	1	–	1	–	0	3	–	4	–	1
Millsaps	1	–	1	–	0	1	–	1	–	0
Mercer	1	–	2	–	0	4	–	6	–	0
Transylvania	0	–	1	–	0	0	–	1	–	0
The Citadel	0	–	2	–	0	3	–	5	–	0
Howard (AL)	0	–	2	–	0	2	–	6	–	2
Louisville	0	–	2	–	0	2	–	7	–	0
Wofford	0	–	2	–	0	2	–	7	–	0
Oglethorpe	0	–	4	–	0	1	–	9	–	0
$ – Conference champion; * – co-member of SoCon

The 1922 Oglethorpe Stormy Petrels football team represented Oglethorpe University in the sport of American football during the 1922 college football season. The Stormy Petrels faced a tough schedule, evidenced by its record. They played against some of the toughest teams in the United States. Many of the games were very close. An interesting note is that the Sewanee assistant, Herb Stein, was the brother of the Oglethorpe coach.

== Schedule ==
Date	Opponent	Site	Result	Source
September 30	at Georgia Tech*	Grant Field; Atlanta, GA	L 6–31	
October 7	at Alabama*	Denny Field; Tuscaloosa, AL	L 0–41	
October 14	at Sewanee	Hardee Field; Sewanee, TN	L 0–19	
October 21	Furman	Ponce de Leon Park; Atlanta, GA	L 0–26	
October 27	at Georgia*	Sanford Field; Athens, GA	L 6–26	
November 4	at Trinity (NC)*	Hanes Field; Durham, NC	L 6–7	
November 11	at Fort Benning*	Columbus, GA	W 14–3	
November 17	at Mercer	Alumni Field; Macon, GA	L 16–18	
November 25	Florida*	Ponce de Leon Park; Atlanta, GA	L 12–0	
November 30	at Chattanooga	Chamberlain Field; Chattanooga, TN	L 9–13	
*Non-conference game
