= 1922 Furman Purple Hurricane football team =

American college football season

1922 Furman Purple Hurricane football

SIAA champion
- Conference: Southern Intercollegiate Athletic Association
- Record: 8–3 (3–0 SIAA)
- Head coach: Billy Laval (8th season)
- Captain: Dizzy McLeod
- Home stadium: Manly Field

1922 Southern Intercollegiate Athletic Association football standings
	Conf.					Overall
Team	W		L		T	W		L		T
Furman $	3	–	0	–	0	8	–	3	–	0
Vanderbilt*	2	–	0	–	0	8	–	0	–	1
Presbyterian	2	–	0	–	0	6	–	2	–	1
Mississippi College	2	–	0	–	0	6	–	3	–	0
Centre	1	–	0	–	0	8	–	2	–	0
Georgetown (KY)	1	–	0	–	0	1	–	1	–	0
Chattanooga	3	–	1	–	0	6	–	2	–	1
Western Kentucky	1	–	1	–	0	9	–	1	–	0
Sewanee	1	–	1	–	0	3	–	4	–	1
Millsaps	1	–	1	–	0	1	–	1	–	0
Mercer	1	–	2	–	0	4	–	6	–	0
Transylvania	0	–	1	–	0	0	–	1	–	0
The Citadel	0	–	2	–	0	3	–	5	–	0
Howard (AL)	0	–	2	–	0	2	–	6	–	2
Louisville	0	–	2	–	0	2	–	7	–	0
Wofford	0	–	2	–	0	2	–	7	–	0
Oglethorpe	0	–	4	–	0	1	–	9	–	0
$ – Conference champion; * – co-member of SoCon

The 1922 Furman Purple Hurricane football team represented the Furman University as a member of the Southern Intercollegiate Athletic Association (SIAA) during the 1922 college football season. Led by eighth-year head coach Billy Laval, the Purple Hurricane compiled an overall record of 8–3 with a mark of 3–0 in conference play, winning the SIAA title. The team upset Florida.

== Schedule ==
Date	Opponent	Site	Result	Source
September 29	Newberry*	Manly Field; Greenville, SC	W 33–0	
October 7	at Florida*	Fleming Field; Gainesville, FL	W 7–6	
October 14	Georgia*	Manly Field; Greenville, SC	L 0–7	
October 19	vs. The Citadel	Pee Dee Fairgrounds; Florence, SC (rivalry)	W 28–0	
October 21	at Oglethorpe	Ponce de Leon Park; Atlanta, GA	W 26–0	
October 28	Richmond*	Manly Field; Greenville, SC	L 0–13	
November 4	Erskine*	Manly Field; Greenville, SC	W 67–6	
November 11	at South Carolina*	University Field; Columbia, SC	L 7–27	
November 18	Wofford	Spartanburg, SC (rivalry)	W 41–0	
November 25	Clemson*	Manly Field; Greenville, SC	W 20–6	
November 30	Davidson*	Manly Field; Greenville, SC	W 13–10	
*Non-conference game
