= 1922 South Carolina Gamecocks football team =

American college football season

1922 South Carolina Gamecocks football
- Conference: Southern Conference
- Record: 5–4 (0–2 SoCon)
- Head coach: Sol Metzger (3rd season)
- Captain: Alex Waite
- Home stadium: University Field

1922 Southern Conference football standings
	Conf.					Overall
Team	W		L		T	W		L		T
North Carolina +	5	–	0	–	0	9	–	1	–	0
Georgia Tech +	4	–	0	–	0	7	–	2	–	0
Vanderbilt * +	3	–	0	–	0	8	–	0	–	1
VPI	3	–	0	–	0	8	–	1	–	1
Florida	2	–	0	–	0	7	–	2	–	0
Auburn	2	–	1	–	0	8	–	2	–	0
Tennessee	3	–	2	–	0	8	–	2	–	0
Alabama	3	–	2	–	1	6	–	3	–	1
Virginia	1	–	1	–	1	4	–	4	–	1
Mississippi A&M	2	–	3	–	0	3	–	4	–	2
Kentucky	1	–	2	–	0	6	–	3	–	0
Clemson	1	–	2	–	0	5	–	4	–	0
Washington and Lee	1	–	2	–	0	5	–	3	–	1
Maryland	1	–	2	–	0	4	–	5	–	1
LSU	1	–	2	–	0	3	–	7	–	0
Georgia	1	–	3	–	1	5	–	4	–	1
Tulane	1	–	4	–	0	4	–	4	–	0
South Carolina	0	–	2	–	0	5	–	4	–	0
Ole Miss	0	–	2	–	0	4	–	5	–	1
NC State	0	–	5	–	0	4	–	6	–	0
+ – Conference co-champions; * – co-member of SIAA

The 1922 South Carolina Gamecocks football team represented the University of South Carolina during the 1922 Southern Conference football season. It was the team's first season in the Southern Conference (SoCon). Led by third-year head coach Sol Metzger, the Gamecocks compiled an overall record of 5–4 with a mark of 0–2 in conference play, tying for 18th place in the SoCon.

== Schedule ==
Date	Opponent	Site	Result	Source
September 29	Erskine*	University Field; Columbia, SC	W 13–0	
October 7	Presbyterian*	University Field; Columbia, SC	W 7–0	
October 14	at North Carolina	Emerson Field; Chapel Hill, NC	L 7–10	
October 20	Wofford*	University Field; Columbia, SC	W 20–0	
October 26	Clemson	State Fairgrounds; Columbia, SC	L 0–3	
November 4	Sewanee*	University Field; Columbia, SC	L 6–7	
November 11	Furman*	University Field; Columbia, SC	W 27–7	
November 16	vs. The Citadel*	County Fairgrounds; Orangeburg, SC	W 13–0	
November 30	at Centre*	Cheek Field; Danville, KY	L 0–42	
*Non-conference game
