= 1922 Howard Bulldogs football team =

American college football season

1922 Howard Bulldogs football
- Conference: Southern Intercollegiate Athletic Association
- Record: 2–6–2 (0–2 SIAA)
- Head coach: Harris G. Cope (1st season)
- Home stadium: Berry Field; Rickwood Field

1922 Southern Intercollegiate Athletic Association football standings
	Conf.					Overall
Team	W		L		T	W		L		T
Furman $	3	–	0	–	0	8	–	3	–	0
Vanderbilt*	2	–	0	–	0	8	–	0	–	1
Presbyterian	2	–	0	–	0	6	–	2	–	1
Mississippi College	2	–	0	–	0	6	–	3	–	0
Centre	1	–	0	–	0	8	–	2	–	0
Georgetown (KY)	1	–	0	–	0	1	–	1	–	0
Chattanooga	3	–	1	–	0	6	–	2	–	1
Western Kentucky	1	–	1	–	0	9	–	1	–	0
Sewanee	1	–	1	–	0	3	–	4	–	1
Millsaps	1	–	1	–	0	1	–	1	–	0
Mercer	1	–	2	–	0	4	–	6	–	0
Transylvania	0	–	1	–	0	0	–	1	–	0
The Citadel	0	–	2	–	0	3	–	5	–	0
Howard (AL)	0	–	2	–	0	2	–	6	–	2
Louisville	0	–	2	–	0	2	–	7	–	0
Wofford	0	–	2	–	0	2	–	7	–	0
Oglethorpe	0	–	4	–	0	1	–	9	–	0
$ – Conference champion; * – co-member of SoCon

The 1922 Howard Bulldogs football team was an American football team that represented Howard College (now known as the Samford University) as a member of the Southern Intercollegiate Athletic Association (SIAA) during the 1922 college football season. In their first year under head coach Harris G. Cope, the team compiled a 2–6–2 record.

== Schedule ==
Date	Opponent	Site	Result	Source
September 23	Jacksonville State*	Berry Field; Birmingham, AL (rivalry)	W 12–0	
September 30	Auburn*	Rickwood Field; Birmingham, AL	L 0–72	
October 7	Marion*	Rickwood Field; Birmingham, AL	T 0–0	
October 14	at Mississippi A&M*	Scott Field; Starkville, MS	T 0–0	
October 20	at Mississippi College	State Fairgrounds; Jackson, MS	L 0–28	
October 28	at Florida*	Fleming Field; Gainesville, FL	L 0–57	
November 4	Union (TN)*	Rickwood Field; Birmingham, AL	L 7–20	
November 11	at Spring Hill*	Monroe Park; Mobile, AL	L 0–48	
November 16	at Millsaps	State Fairgrounds; Jackson, MS	L 7–13	
November 25	vs. Birmingham–Southern*	Rickwood Field; Birmingham, AL	W 9–7	
*Non-conference game
