= Edwin Pritchard =

American hurdler

Edwin M. Pritchard (May 17, 1889 – April 3, 1976) was an American track and field athlete and a member of the Irish American Athletic Club who competed in the 1912 Summer Olympics.

He was born in Jersey City, New Jersey and died in Wheaton, Illinois.

In 1912, he was eliminated in the semi-finals of the 110 metre hurdles competition.

== Sources ==
- Sullivan, James E. (1912). The Olympic Games Stockholm - 1912 (PDF). New York: American Sports Publishing Company. Archived from the original (PDF) on 2008-04-10.
