= 1922 Presbyterian Blue Hose football team =

American college football season

1922 Presbyterian Blue Hose football
- Conference: Southern Intercollegiate Athletic Association
- Record: 6–2–1 (2–0 SIAA)
- Head coach: Walter A. Johnson (7th season)
- Captain: J. B. Clowney

1922 Southern Intercollegiate Athletic Association football standings
	Conf.					Overall
Team	W		L		T	W		L		T
Furman $	3	–	0	–	0	8	–	3	–	0
Vanderbilt*	2	–	0	–	0	8	–	0	–	1
Presbyterian	2	–	0	–	0	6	–	2	–	1
Mississippi College	2	–	0	–	0	6	–	3	–	0
Centre	1	–	0	–	0	8	–	2	–	0
Georgetown (KY)	1	–	0	–	0	1	–	1	–	0
Chattanooga	3	–	1	–	0	6	–	2	–	1
Western Kentucky	1	–	1	–	0	9	–	1	–	0
Sewanee	1	–	1	–	0	3	–	4	–	1
Millsaps	1	–	1	–	0	1	–	1	–	0
Mercer	1	–	2	–	0	4	–	6	–	0
Transylvania	0	–	1	–	0	0	–	1	–	0
The Citadel	0	–	2	–	0	3	–	5	–	0
Howard (AL)	0	–	2	–	0	2	–	6	–	2
Louisville	0	–	2	–	0	2	–	7	–	0
Wofford	0	–	2	–	0	2	–	7	–	0
Oglethorpe	0	–	4	–	0	1	–	9	–	0
$ – Conference champion; * – co-member of SoCon

The 1922 Presbyterian Blue Hose football team represented Presbyterian College as a member of the Southern Intercollegiate Athletic Association (SIAA) during the 1922 college football season. Led by seventh-year head coach Walter A. Johnson, Presbyterian compiled an overall record of 6–2–1 with a mark of 2–0 in SIAA play. The team captain was J. B. Clowney.

== Schedule ==
Date	Opponent	Site	Result	Attendance	Source
September 29	Davidson*	Clinton, SC	W 8–7	1,300	
October 7	at South Carolina*	University Field; Columbia, SC	L 0–6		
October 13	at Clemson*	Riggs Field; Clemson, SC	L 0–13		
October 19	vs. Erskine*	Piedmont Fairgrounds; Greenwood, SC	W 19–0		
October 28	at The Citadel	College Park Stadium; Charleston, SC	W 9–0		
November 4	at Wofford	Spartanburg, SC	W 32–0		
November 11	North Georgia*	Clinton, SC	W 67–0		
November 17	at Trinity (NC)*	Hanes Field; Durham, NC	T 6–6		
December 2	Newberry*	Clinton, SC (Bronze Derby)	W 35–9		
*Non-conference game
