= 1922 Sewanee Tigers football team =

American college football season

1922 Sewanee Tigers football
- Conference: Southern Intercollegiate Athletic Association
- Record: 3–4–1 (1–1 SIAA)
- Head coach: John Nicholson (2nd season)
- Captain: Bill Coughlan
- Home stadium: Hardee Field

1922 Southern Intercollegiate Athletic Association football standings
	Conf.					Overall
Team	W		L		T	W		L		T
Furman $	3	–	0	–	0	8	–	3	–	0
Vanderbilt*	2	–	0	–	0	8	–	0	–	1
Presbyterian	2	–	0	–	0	6	–	2	–	1
Mississippi College	2	–	0	–	0	6	–	3	–	0
Centre	1	–	0	–	0	8	–	2	–	0
Georgetown (KY)	1	–	0	–	0	1	–	1	–	0
Chattanooga	3	–	1	–	0	6	–	2	–	1
Western Kentucky	1	–	1	–	0	9	–	1	–	0
Sewanee	1	–	1	–	0	3	–	4	–	1
Millsaps	1	–	1	–	0	1	–	1	–	0
Mercer	1	–	2	–	0	4	–	6	–	0
Transylvania	0	–	1	–	0	0	–	1	–	0
The Citadel	0	–	2	–	0	3	–	5	–	0
Howard (AL)	0	–	2	–	0	2	–	6	–	2
Louisville	0	–	2	–	0	2	–	7	–	0
Wofford	0	–	2	–	0	2	–	7	–	0
Oglethorpe	0	–	4	–	0	1	–	9	–	0
$ – Conference champion; * – co-member of SoCon

The 1922 Sewanee Tigers football team represented Sewanee: The University of the South during the 1922 college football season as a member of the Southern Intercollegiate Athletic Association (SIAA). The Tigers were led by head coach John Nicholson in his second season and finished with a record of three wins, four losses, and one tie (3–4–1 overall, 1–1 in the SIAA).

== Schedule ==
Date	Opponent	Site	Result	Attendance	Source
October 7	at Penn*	Franklin Field; Philadelphia, PA	L 0–27	20,000	
October 14	Oglethorpe	Hardee Field; Sewanee, TN	W 19–0		
October 21	at Alabama*	Rickwood Field; Birmingham, AL	T 7–7		
October 28	at Kentucky*	Stoll Field; Lexington, KY	L 0–7		
November 4	at South Carolina*	University Field; Columbia, SC	W 7–6		
November 11	Birmingham–Southern*	Hardee Field; Sewanee, TN	W 21–0		
November 18	vs. Tennessee*	Chamberlain Field; Chattanooga, TN	L 7–18	4,000	
November 30	at Vanderbilt	Dudley Field; Nashville, TN (rivalry)	L 0–26	20,000	
*Non-conference game
