= 1922 The Citadel Bulldogs football team =

American college football season

1922 The Citadel Bulldogs football
- Conference: Southern Intercollegiate Athletic Association
- Record: 3–5 (0–2 SIAA)
- Head coach: Carl Prause (1st season)
- Home stadium: College Park Stadium

1922 Southern Intercollegiate Athletic Association football standings
	Conf.					Overall
Team	W		L		T	W		L		T
Furman $	3	–	0	–	0	8	–	3	–	0
Vanderbilt*	2	–	0	–	0	8	–	0	–	1
Presbyterian	2	–	0	–	0	6	–	2	–	1
Mississippi College	2	–	0	–	0	6	–	3	–	0
Centre	1	–	0	–	0	8	–	2	–	0
Georgetown (KY)	1	–	0	–	0	1	–	1	–	0
Chattanooga	3	–	1	–	0	6	–	2	–	1
Western Kentucky	1	–	1	–	0	9	–	1	–	0
Sewanee	1	–	1	–	0	3	–	4	–	1
Millsaps	1	–	1	–	0	1	–	1	–	0
Mercer	1	–	2	–	0	4	–	6	–	0
Transylvania	0	–	1	–	0	0	–	1	–	0
The Citadel	0	–	2	–	0	3	–	5	–	0
Howard (AL)	0	–	2	–	0	2	–	6	–	2
Louisville	0	–	2	–	0	2	–	7	–	0
Wofford	0	–	2	–	0	2	–	7	–	0
Oglethorpe	0	–	4	–	0	1	–	9	–	0
$ – Conference champion; * – co-member of SoCon

The 1922 The Citadel Bulldogs football team represented The Citadel, The Military College of South Carolina in the 1922 college football season. Carl Prause served as head coach for the first season. The Bulldogs played as members of the Southern Intercollegiate Athletic Association and played home games at College Park Stadium in Hampton Park.

== Schedule ==
Date	Opponent	Site	Result	Source
October 7	Parris Island Marines*	College Park Stadium; Charleston, SC	W 14–6	
October 19	vs. Furman	Pee Dee Fairgrounds; Florence, SC (rivalry)	L 0–28	
October 28	Presbyterian	College Park Stadium; Charleston, SC	L 0–9	
November 4	at Newberry*	Setzler Field; Newberry, SC	L 7–10	
November 11	Clemson*	College Park Stadium; Charleston, SC	L 0–18	
November 16	vs. South Carolina*	County Fairgrounds; Orangeburg, SC	L 0–13	
November 25	at Southern College (FL)*	Adair Park; Lakeland, FL	W 53–0	
November 30	Erskine*	College Park Stadium; Charleston, SC	W 26–0	
*Non-conference game
