= Henry Blakeney =

British athlete (1890–1958)

Henry Edward Hugh Blakeney (8 October 1890 – 12 February 1958) was a British track and field athlete who competed in the 1912 Summer Olympics.

In 1912, he was eliminated in the semi-finals of the 110 metre hurdles competition. He was eliminated in the first round in the 100 metres event.
