= Vaughn Blanchard =

American baseball player

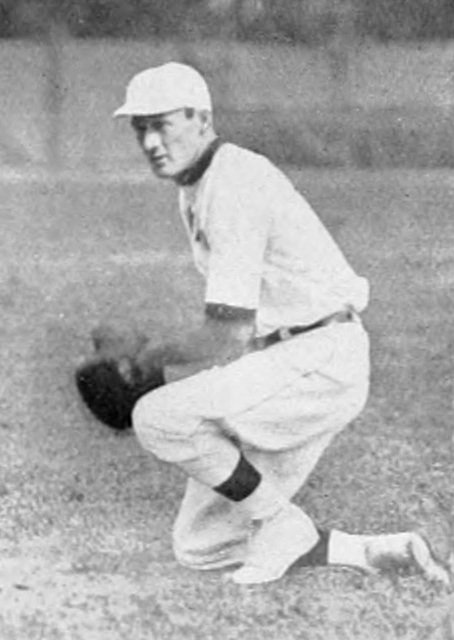
- Blanchard at the 1912 Olympics

Personal information
- Born: July 11, 1889 Franklin, New Hampshire, United States
- Died: November 26, 1969 (aged 80) Sarasota County, Florida, United States
- Height: 1.86 m (6 ft 1 in)
- Weight: 75 kg (165 lb)

Sport
- Sport: Hurdles, baseball
- Club: Boston Athletic Association

Vaughn Seavey Blanchard (July 11, 1889 – November 26, 1969) was an American track and field athlete who competed in the 110 m hurdles and in the exhibition baseball tournament at the 1912 Summer Olympics. He attended Bates College in Lewiston Maine and later became a well known physical education proponent in Michigan.

== Biography ==
Blanchard was born in Franklin, New Hampshire in 1889 and graduated from Pittsfield High School in Pittsfield, New Hampshire in 1908. Blanchard graduated from Bates College in 1912 where he was the Maine intercollegiate champion for three years and won the junior low hurdles national championship in 1911. He then competed at the 1912 Summer Olympics in the 110 meter hurdles and in the exhibition baseball tournament. He studied at the YMCA Training College (Springfield College) from 1912 to 1913. He worked as a French and German teacher and track coach at the Worcester Academy in Worcester, Massachusetts from 1913 to 1915 and at New Hampshire State College in Durham in 1915. He then served as a track coach at Phillips Andover Academy in Andover, Massachusetts from 1915 to 1919 before serving the YMCA overseas.

During World War I in 1917 Blanchard trained troops at Camp Wadsworth in South Carolina in physical fitness and then temporarily taught at the University of Alabama before returning to Massachusetts to teach at Medford High School. In 1920 Blanchard moved to Michigan and worked at several schools in Detroit including Central and Cass High Schools. From 1929 to 1954 Blanchard served as director of the Detroit public schools' Health and Physical Education departments and at one point on the Board of Education in Detroit and received various national awards. Blanchard was a proponent of intramural sports and "believed that there was an overemphasis on competitive athletics. He favored a withdrawal from outside competition and endorsed the development of a program of greater intraschool, intramural activity" and he also supported students managing, coaching, and organizing the sports events. In the 1930s Blanchard served as a lecturer at the University of Michigan where he received a Master's degree in physical education in 1936, and he also was the athletic director at Wayne University.
