= Hugh Mixon =

American football player and treasurer (1899–1976)

Profile
- Position: Halfback

Personal information
- Born: December 6, 1899; Marianna, Arkansas
- Died: February 10, 1976 (aged 76); Marianna, Arkansas
- Listed weight: 160 lb (73 kg)

Career information
- High school: Polytechnic H.S. (Calif.)
- College: Vanderbilt (1920–1922)

Hugh Clarke Mixon (December 6, 1899 – February 10, 1976) was a treasurer of Lee County, Arkansas. He attended Vanderbilt University and Stanford University. At the former, he was a member of Dan McGugin's football teams.
