= Alfred Michael "Chief" Venne =

Alfred Michael Venne (Ojibwe: Soangetaha; 1879 – 1971) was an Ojibwa (Chippewa) Native American. He was educated at the Carlisle Indian Industrial School, Pennsylvania. He later became an educator, athletic manager and coach, administrator and mentor to countless young men.

== Early life ==
Alfred M. Venne was born near Leroy, Pembina County, Dakota Territory, in 1879. His Native American name was Soangetaha (Fiero: Zoongide'e, "Strong Hearted"). After early education at local Indian Schools, Alfred entered Carlisle in 1899. He was an excellent football and baseball player under their famous Coach Glenn S. "Pop" Warner. Venne graduated from Carlisle in the class of 1904. Warner coached Carlisle 1899-1903 and 1907-1914. The 1904-06 football teams were Indian coached with great success by Eddy Rodgers and Bemus Pierce, both former Carlisle All-Americans. Upon his graduation, Alfred was highly regarded and retained on staff at Carlisle as an athletic trainer and coach. His extraordinary skills were also utilized as football team business manager, band manager, museum curator, and photography lab instructor and manager. He was a member of a group from Carlisle which took part in the President Theodore Roosevelt Inaugural Parade in March, 1905 in Washington D.C., at which time he met and became friends with the great Apache War Chief Geronimo. The legendary Jim Thorpe arrived at Carlisle in 1904 at age 16. He had played baseball, ran track, etc., but had not played football. Alfred trained and coached Thorpe in several sports and was instrumental in preparing him to play football in 1907 when Pop Warner returned to Carlisle from Cornell as head coach.

== Family ==
Alfred was the son of Michel Venne, an Ojibwa tribal chief and farmer. After graduation from Carlisle, Alfred married Sarah Williams, a Seneca from New York. She was also a Carlisle graduate and trained as a nurse. They had a son, Alfred M. Venne, Jr. (1908–1939), who died from TB after a long illness in Missouri. They also had a daughter Victoria Haskell Venne.

== Later life ==
Alfred was transferred from Carlisle to the Chilocco Indian School, Oklahoma in 1909, where he served briefly. He then spent a number of years as Athletic Manager and Coach at Haskell Indian Institute in Kansas, and later worked as a YMCA Director. He retired in 1946 as athletic director at the Kansas City Athletic Club. He then moved to Austin, Texas, and worked for the Capitol Area Council of boy scouts serving as Ranger at Camp Tom Wooten. He also developed the Tonkawa Lodge Indian Dance Group. In late 1953, Chief Venne relocated to Sebastopol, California, and continued to be involved with several boy scout councils. Chief Venne died in January, 1971 in California at the age of 91. He had cherished his Carlisle experience, with the belief that his people needed to become educated and assimilate into American society. He was proud of his Native American roots, embraced his culture and remained a devout Christian during his entire life.
