= Martin Hawkins =

American hurdler

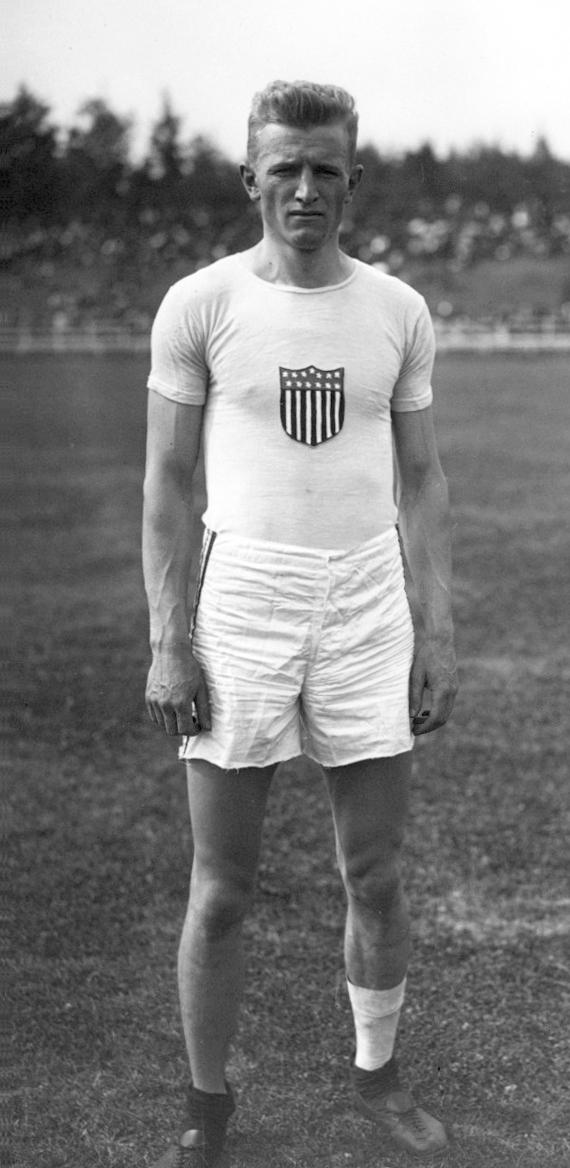
- Martin Hawkins in 1912

Personal information
- Born: February 20, 1888 Schenectady, United States
- Died: October 27, 1959 (aged 71) Portland, Oregon, United States
- Height: 1.75 m (5 ft 9 in)
- Weight: 68 kg (150 lb)

Sport
- Sport: Athletics
- Event: 110 m hurdles
- Club: Multnomah AC, Portland

Achievements and titles
- Personal best: 110 mH – 15.3 (1912)
Medal record
Representing the United States
Olympic Games
Bronze medal – third place	1912 Stockholm	110 metre hurdles

Martin William Hawkins (February 20, 1888 – October 27, 1959) was an American athlete who won the bronze medal in the 110 m hurdles at the 1912 Summer Olympics.

A track star at the University of Oregon, Hawkins later attended law school at Oregon and became a lawyer and judge in Portland.
