= 1922 Mercer Baptists football team =

American college football season

1922 Mercer Baptists football
- Conference: Southern Intercollegiate Athletic Association
- Record: 5–6 (1–2 SIAA)
- Head coach: Josh Cody (3rd season)
- Home stadium: Alumni Field

1922 Southern Intercollegiate Athletic Association football standings
	Conf.					Overall
Team	W		L		T	W		L		T
Furman $	3	–	0	–	0	8	–	3	–	0
Vanderbilt*	2	–	0	–	0	8	–	0	–	1
Presbyterian	2	–	0	–	0	6	–	2	–	1
Mississippi College	2	–	0	–	0	6	–	3	–	0
Centre	1	–	0	–	0	8	–	2	–	0
Georgetown (KY)	1	–	0	–	0	1	–	1	–	0
Chattanooga	3	–	1	–	0	6	–	2	–	1
Western Kentucky	1	–	1	–	0	9	–	1	–	0
Sewanee	1	–	1	–	0	3	–	4	–	1
Millsaps	1	–	1	–	0	1	–	1	–	0
Mercer	1	–	2	–	0	4	–	6	–	0
Transylvania	0	–	1	–	0	0	–	1	–	0
The Citadel	0	–	2	–	0	3	–	5	–	0
Howard (AL)	0	–	2	–	0	2	–	6	–	2
Louisville	0	–	2	–	0	2	–	7	–	0
Wofford	0	–	2	–	0	2	–	7	–	0
Oglethorpe	0	–	4	–	0	1	–	9	–	0
$ – Conference champion; * – co-member of SoCon

The 1922 Mercer Baptists football team was an American football team that represented Mercer University as a member of the Southern Intercollegiate Athletic Association (SIAA) during the 1922 college football season. In their third season under head coach Josh Cody, Mercer compiled a 5–6 record.

== Schedule ==
Date	Opponent	Site	Result	Source
September 23	Piedmont*	Alumni Field; Macon, GA	W 24–3	
September 30	at Georgia*	Sanford Field; Athens, GA	L 0–41	
October 7	North Georgia*	Alumni Field; Macon, GA	W 31–0	
October 14	at Birmingham–Southern*	Munger Bowl; Birmingham, AL	W 17–13	
October 21	at Auburn*	Drake Field; Auburn, AL	L 6–50	
October 28	at Vanderbilt	Dudley Field; Nashville, TN	L 0–25	
November 3	Maryville (TN)*	Alumni Field; Macon, GA	W 12–0	
November 11	at Chattanooga	Chamberlain Field; Chattanooga, TN	L 6–13	
November 17	Oglethorpe	Alumni Field; Macon, GA	W 18–16	
November 24	at Carson–Newman*	Shields–Watkins Field; Knoxville, TN	L 7–12	
December 2	at Camp Benning*	Driving Park; Columbus, GA	L 13–27	
*Non-conference game
