= 1923 College Football All-Southern Team =

American all-star college football team

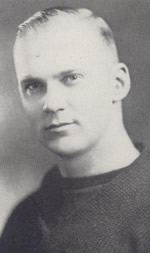
Lynn Bomar of Vanderbilt was selected an All-American by Walter Camp.

The 1923 College Football All-Southern Team consists of American football players selected to the College Football All-Southern Teams selected by various organizations for the 1923 Southern Conference football season.

Vanderbilt won the SoCon championship, its last conference title to date. Florida upset previously undefeated Alabama on the last week of play.

== Composite eleven ==
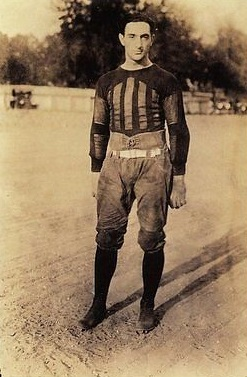
Ark Newton of Florida.

The composite All-Southern eleven put out by the Atlanta Journal who received gold medals included:

- Joe Bennett, tackle for Georgia. One writer notes: "Prior to the 1960s, Bennett is likely Georgia's most outstanding tackle." He was later a Coca-Cola executive.
- Lynn Bomar, end for Vanderbilt, the last southern player selected a first-team All-American by Walter Camp. Bomar played with the New York Giants of the National Football League (NFL) in their inaugural season and was later warden of Tennessee State Prison. Inducted into the College Football Hall of Fame in 1956.
- Grant Gillis, quarterback for Alabama. Gillis played professional baseball for the Washington Senators and Boston Red Sox.
- Goldy Goldstein, tackle for Florida. Goldstein was one of the first Jews to ever play for the Gators. He played professionally for the Newark Bears of the first American Football League (AFL), and was later an attorney practicing in Miami Beach.
- Everett E. Kelly, guard for Vanderbilt, known as "Tuck." After a bitterly fought loss to national champion Michigan on Ferry Field, the referee McDonald approached Kelly and told him, "You are the first individual I've complimented after a game in which I officiated, but I want to tell you that I never saw a better guard than you are."
- Ark Newton, halfback for Florida. Newton's punts, including one of at least 60 yards, helped the Gators in their 16 to 6 upset victory over previously undefeated Alabama.
- Clyde Propst, center for Alabama, known as "Shorty." Propst later coached at various institutions, including as an assistant at his alma mater and as the head coach at Howard and Southwestern.

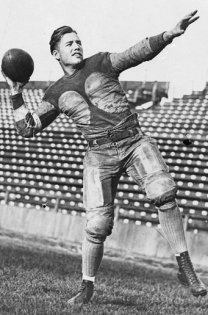
Doug Wycoff of Georgia Tech was a near unanimous selection.

- Gil Reese, halfback for Vanderbilt. Reese was the team's leading scorer, netting nine touchdowns in two weeks in the victories over Tennessee and Georgia had by a combined 86–14.
- Robbie Robinson, tackle and captain for Florida. On the Gators' upset of previously undefeated Alabama, he said "Psychology did the trick and turned the tables on the Crimson, for the word went the rounds on the campus that "they can't do it"'–referring to Alabama's chances of walking on the Florida team. He also remarked on the many goal line stands by Florida.
- Henry Wakefield, end for Vanderbilt, known as "Hek." After the loss to Michigan opposing coach Fielding Yost said "I never saw a greater exhibition of end play", referring to Wakefield. The Kingsport Times reported that governor Austin Peay had also given Hek praise for his play that day. Coach Dan McGugin rated Wakefield as one of the six greatest players he ever coached.
- Doug Wycoff, fullback for Georgia Tech. Coach Alexander recalled "The work of Douglas Wycoff against Notre Dame two years in succession was brilliant in the extreme, as was his plunging against Penn State when we defeated them twice." Wycoff played professionally for various teams in both the AFL and NFL including with the Newark Bears. He was inducted into the Georgia Sports Hall of Fame in 1978.

== Composite overview ==
Doug Wycoff received the most votes of any player in the composite selection.

| Name | Position | School | First-team selections |
|---|---|---|---|
| Doug Wycoff | Fullback | Georgia Tech | 30 |
| Gil Reese | Halfback | Vanderbilt | 25 |
| Lynn Bomar | End | Vanderbilt | 23 |
| Hek Wakefield | End | Vanderbilt | 19 |
| Joe Bennett | Tackle | Georgia | 17 |
| Shorty Propst | Center | Alabama | 15 |
| Goldy Goldstein | Guard | Florida | 14 |
| Tuck Kelly | Guard | Vanderbilt | 14 |
| Ark Newton | Halfback | Florida | 13 |
| Rip Reagan | Guard | Auburn | 11 |
| Al Clemens | End | Alabama | 10 |
| Robbie Robinson | Tackle | Florida | 10 |
| John Staton | End | Georgia Tech | 9 |
| Bob Rives | Tackle | Vanderbilt | 9 |
| Charlie Barbour | Tackle | VMI | 8 |
| Claire Frye | Center | Georgia Tech | 8 |
| Grant Gillis | Quarterback | Alabama | 8 |
| Fats Lawrence | Guard | Auburn | 6 |

== All-Southerns of 1923 ==
=== Ends ===
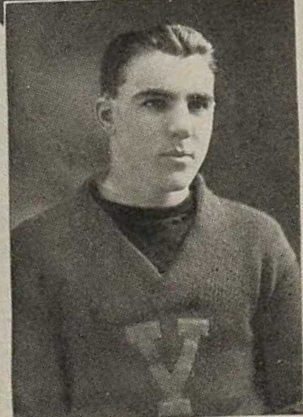
Hek Wakefield of Vanderbilt.

- Lynn Bomar*, Vanderbilt (College Football Hall of Fame) (C, AC, MB, BCL, MN-2, ZN, JB-1, CL [as t], BH-1, JH-1, WGF, WR [as g], FD, NOD, EH, WC, GJ, BE)
- Hek Wakefield, Vanderbilt (C, AC, MB-1, BCL, MT, CL, HP, BH-1, JH-1, WGF, GHB-1, WR, BP, KN, NOD, LB, HB, JF, BE)
- Al Clemens, Alabama (C, ED, HP, JH-2, GHB-2, FD, EH, HC, BE)
- John Staton, Georgia Tech, (C, MB-1, ED, MN-2, BH-2, JH-2, GHB-1, LB, BE)
- Cliff Lemon, Centre (ZN, JB-2, CL, BH-2, BP, WC, JF, GJ, HC, BE)
- Tarzan Holt, Tennessee (GHB-2 [as fb], WR, KN, TT)
- Spec Lightsey, Florida (JB-1, HP)
- Crook Smith, Mercer (MT)
- Case Thomasson, Centre (HB)
- Tuck Carlton, VMI (HC)
- Blood Miller, Sewanee (JB-2, GHB-2)
- Bill Supplee, Maryland (BE)

=== Tackles ===
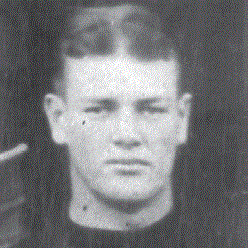
Joe Bennett of Georgia.

- Joe Bennett, Georgia (C, AC, MB, ED, BCL, MT, MN-2, CL, JH-2, WGF [as g], GHB-1, WR, BP, FD, EH, LB, HB, GJ, TT, BE)
- Robbie Robinson, Florida (C, JB-1, BH-2, WGF, GHB-1, FD, EH, BE)
- Bob Rives, Vanderbilt (C, AC, MT, JB-1, BH-1, JH-1, WGF, GHB-2, KN, HB, HC, BE)
- Charlie Barbour, VMI (C, MB, ED, ZN, BH-1, JH-1, BE)
- E. A. Stephenson, Kentucky (BH-2, JH-2, NOD, BE)
- Jack Langhorne, Alabama (KN, JF [as g], HC)
- J. G. Lowe, Tennessee (WR, BE)
- Jim Taylor Georgia (HP)
- Broomley, Maryland (NOD)
- Cy Williams, Florida (LB)
- Jim Walker, Vanderbilt (JF)
- Huffines, Georgia Tech (JF)
- Amos Kent, Sewanee (GJ)
- Tex Tilson, Washington & Lee (TT)
- Ralph Brice, Auburn (JB-2, GHB-2)
- Red Simmons, Mercer (MN-2)

=== Guards ===
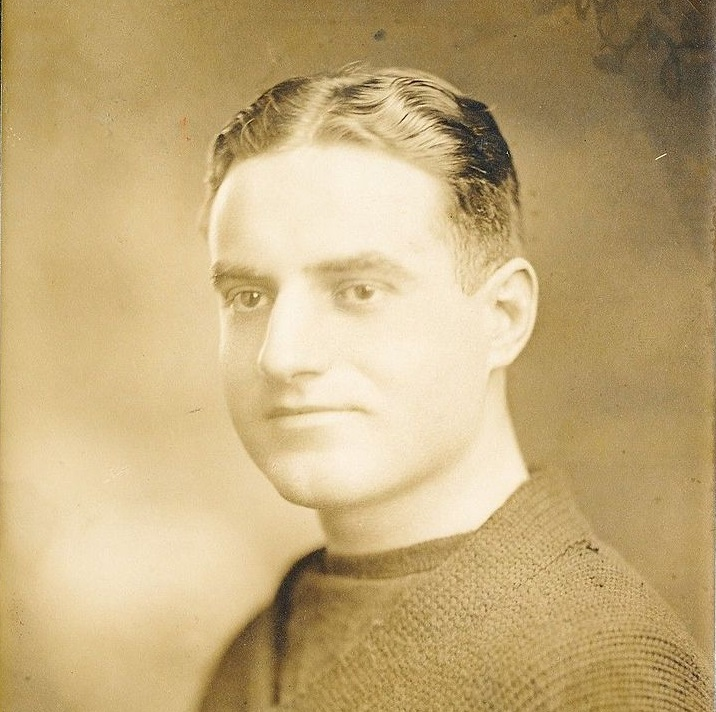
Tuck Kelly of Vanderbilt.

- Goldy Goldstein, Florida (C, AC, ED, ZN, JB-1, BH-1, JH-1, NOD, EH, HC, TT, BE)
- Tuck Kelly, Vanderbilt (C, AC, MB, ED, BCL, ZN, BH-1, JH-2, GHB-1, BP, KN, WC [as t], LB, HB, BE)
- Rip Reagan, Auburn, (C, BCL, MT, WGF, GHB-1, WC, TT, BE)
- H. Lynch, Centre (CL, HP, BH-2, WC [as t], GJ, BP)
- Dell Ramsey, Kentucky (WR, HB)
- Mike Herndon, Mercer (MT)
- Bill Buckler, Alabama (JB-1)
- Fats Hammond, VMI (JH-1)
- Pete Camp, Alabama (NOD)
- Cooper Litton, Sewanee (BH-2, JH-2, GHB-2)
- John McIntyre, Georgia Tech (GHB-2, KN, JF, BE)
- C. L. Terry, Washington & Lee (HC, BE)
- Tom McCracken, VMI (MN-2)
- F. McConnell, Georgia Tech (MN-2)
- Ben Compton, Alabama (JB-2)
- George M. Chinn, Centre (BE)

=== Centers ===
- Shorty Propst, Alabama (C, AC, MB [as g], ZN [as t], JB-1, CL, HP, BH-1, JH-1, WGF, GHB-2, WR, BP [as t], KN, FD, EH, WC [as g], GJ [as g], TT, BE)
- Claire Frye, Georgia Tech (C, MB, MN-2, GHB-1, FD [as g], NOD, EH [as g], BE)
- Fats Lawrence, Auburn (C, ED, ZN, JB-2 [as g], CL [as g], HP [as g], LB [as t], BE)
- Ed Kubale, Centre (BCL, MT, JB-2, BH-2, JH-2, BP, LB, WC, HB, JF, GJ, BE)
- Alf Sharpe, Vanderbilt (FD [as g])
- T. Roosevelt Day, Georgia (HC)

=== Quarterbacks ===
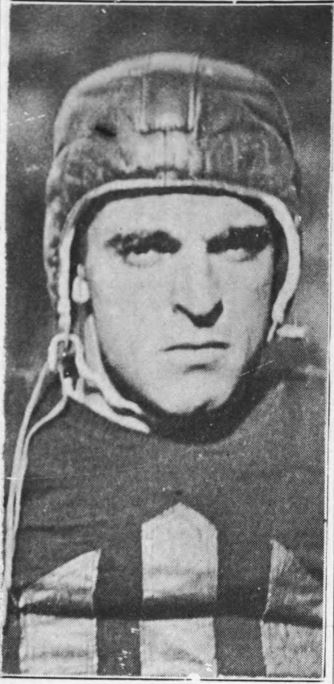
Grant Gillis

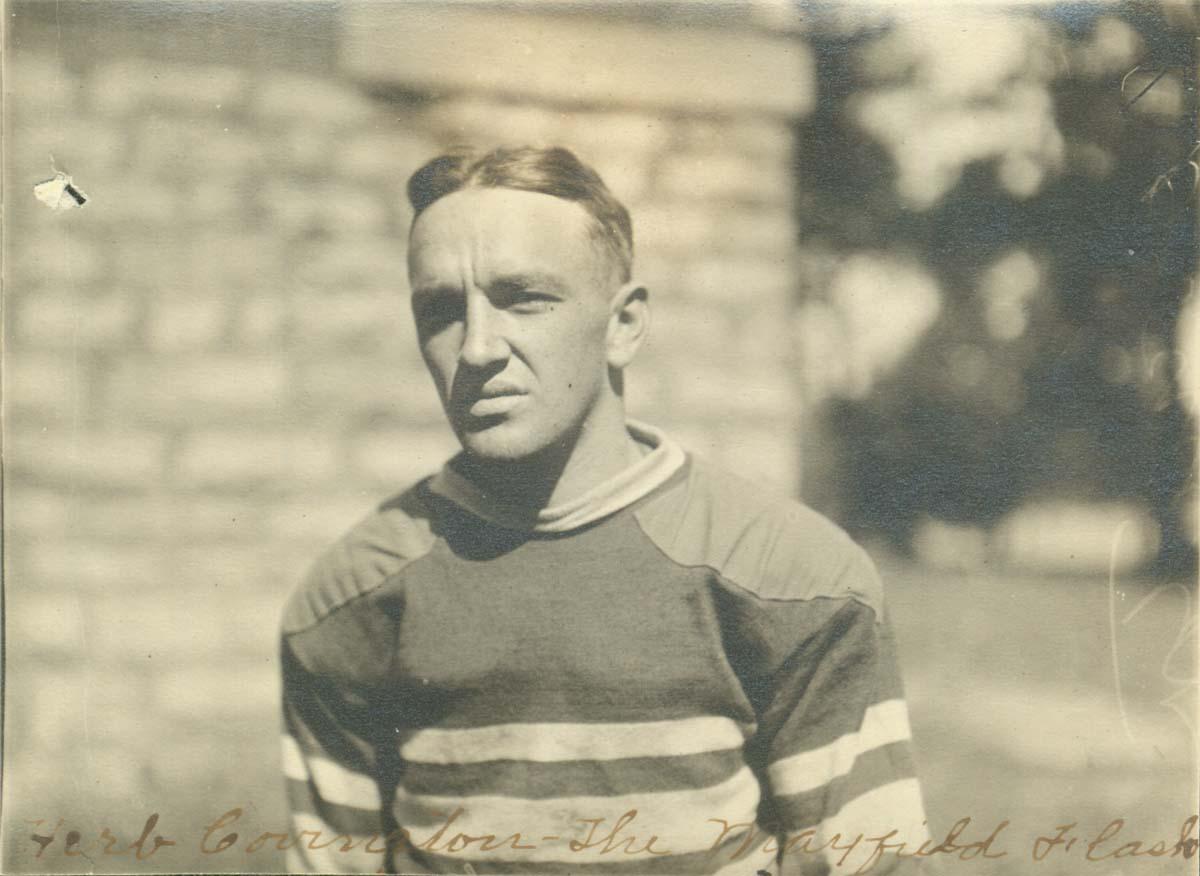
Herb Covington

- Grant Gillis, Alabama (C, MB, ED, JB-1 [as hb], BH-2, JH-2 [as hb], WGF [as hb], GHB-1 [as hb], BE [as hb])
- Herb Covington, Centre (AC, BCL, MT, ZN, JB-1, CL, HP, BH-1, GHB-1, WR, BP, FD, EH, LB, WC, HB, JF, GJ, HC, TT, BE)
- Edgar C. Jones, Florida (MN-2, JB-2 [as qb], BE)
- Monk McDonald, North Carolina (NOD)
- S. D. Peterson, Auburn (GHB-2)
- Boots Groves, Maryland (GHB-2 [as hb])
- Doc Kuhn, Vanderbilt (BE)
- Harry Sutton, VPI (BE)

=== Halfbacks ===
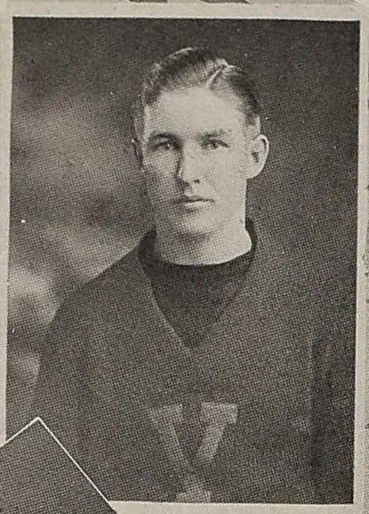
Gil Reese of Vanderbilt.

- Gil Reese, Vanderbilt (C, MB, AC, ED, BCL, MT, ZN, JB-1, CL, HP, BH-1, JH, WGF, GHB-1, WR, BP, KN, FD, NOD, EH [as fb], LB, HB, GJ, TT, BE)
- Ark Newton, Florida (C, AC, MB, BCL [as t], MT, MN-2, JB-2, CL, BH-1, JH, EH, WC, HC, TT, BE)
- Windy White, VMI (MB, ED, BH-2, JH-2 [as fb], GHB-2, BE)
- Brother Brown, Tulane (FD, NOD, EH)
- William Bone, Tennessee (WR, KN)
- John H. Fletcher, Georgia (BCL, JH-2)
- Spurlock, Washington & Lee (WC)
- Ike Williams, Georgia Tech (JF)
- Hudgins, Centre (JF)
- J. E. Luckett, Mississippi A&M (HC)
- Adrian Maurer, Oglethorpe (MN-2, BE)
- Cy Parks, Mississippi College (JB-2)
- William C. Baty, Alabama (BH-2)
- W. Shufford, NC State (BE)

=== Fullbacks ===
- Doug Wycoff, Georgia Tech (C, AC, MB, ED, BCL, MT, ZN [as hb], JB, CL, HP, BH-1, JH, WGF, GHB-1, WR, BP [as hb], KN, FD, NOD, LB [as hb], WC, HB [as hb], GJ [as hb], HC, TT, BE)
- Pooley Hubert, Alabama (College Football Hall of Fame) (MN-2, ZN, HP [as hb])
- Eddie Cameron, Washington & Lee (HB, JF, BE)
- Bill Middlekauff, Florida (JB-2, BH-2, BP, BE)
- Curtis Sanders, Kentucky (LB, BE)
- John Hutchins, Carson-Newman (GJ)
- Jack McQuade, Maryland (BE)

== Key ==
Bold = Composite selection

* = Consensus All-American

C = received votes for the composite All-Southern eleven, using 32 sportswriters, put out by the Atlanta Journal. The composite eleven received gold medals. Votes for multiple positions have been combined under the one which received the most.

AC = another composite selection, using 21 sportswriters.

MB = selected by Morgan Blake of the Atlanta Journal.

ED = selected by Ed Danforth of the Atlanta Georgian.

BCL = selected by B. C. Lumpkin of the Athens Banner.

MT = selected by the Macon Telegraph.

MN = selected by Julian Leggett of the Macon News.

ZN = selected by Zipp Newman of the Birmingham News.

JB = selected by Jerry Bryan of the Birmingham Age-Herald.

CL = selected by Colquitt Love in the Montgomery Journal

HP = selected by Howard Pill of the Montgomery Advertiser.

BH = selected Blinkey Horn of the Nashville Tennessean.

JH = selected by Joe Hatcher of the Nashville Tennessean.

WGF = selected by W. G. Foster of the Chattanooga Times.

GHB = selected by George H. Butler in the Chattanooga News.

WR = selected by Wendell Robinson of the Knoxville Sentinel

BP = selected by Bob Pigue of the News-Scimitar.

KN = selected by the Knoxville News.

FD = selected by Fred Digby of the New Orleans Item.

NOD = selected by the New Orleans Daily States.

EH = selected by Ed Hebert of the Times-Picayune.

LB = selected by Lester Barnes of the Louisville Times.

WC = selected by Warren Collins of the Louisville Herald.

HB = selected by Harry Bloom of the Louisville Post.

JF = selected by John Francis of the Courier-Journal.

GJ = selected by George Joplin of the Danville Messenger.

HC = selected by Harry Cully of the Florida Times-Union.

TT = selected by the Tampa Tribune.

BE = Billy Evans's "All-Southern" Honor Roll

== See also ==
- 1923 College Football All-America Team
