= 1922 College Football All-Southern Team =

American all-star college football team

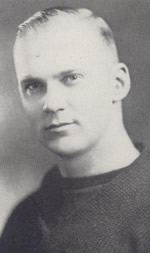
Lynn Bomar of Vanderbilt.

The 1922 College Football All-Southern Team consists of college football players chosen by various organizations and writers for College Football All-Southern Teams for the 1922 Southern Conference football season. It was the first season of the Southern Conference.

Vanderbilt end Lynn Bomar and Georgia Tech running back Red Barron were the only two unanimous choices of a composite of selectors. Walter Camp picked no Southerners for his first-team All-American, but picked Bomar and Barron for his second team.

== Composite eleven ==
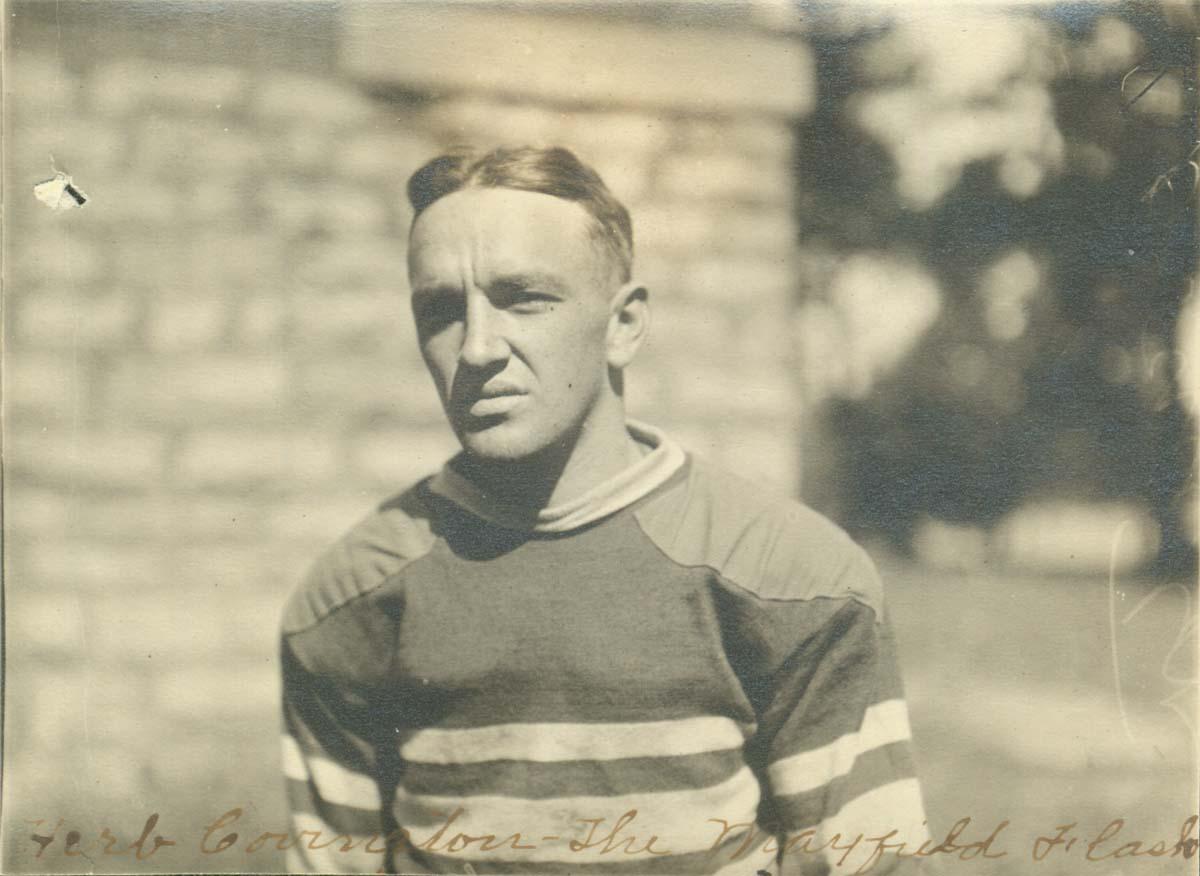
Herb Covington of Centre

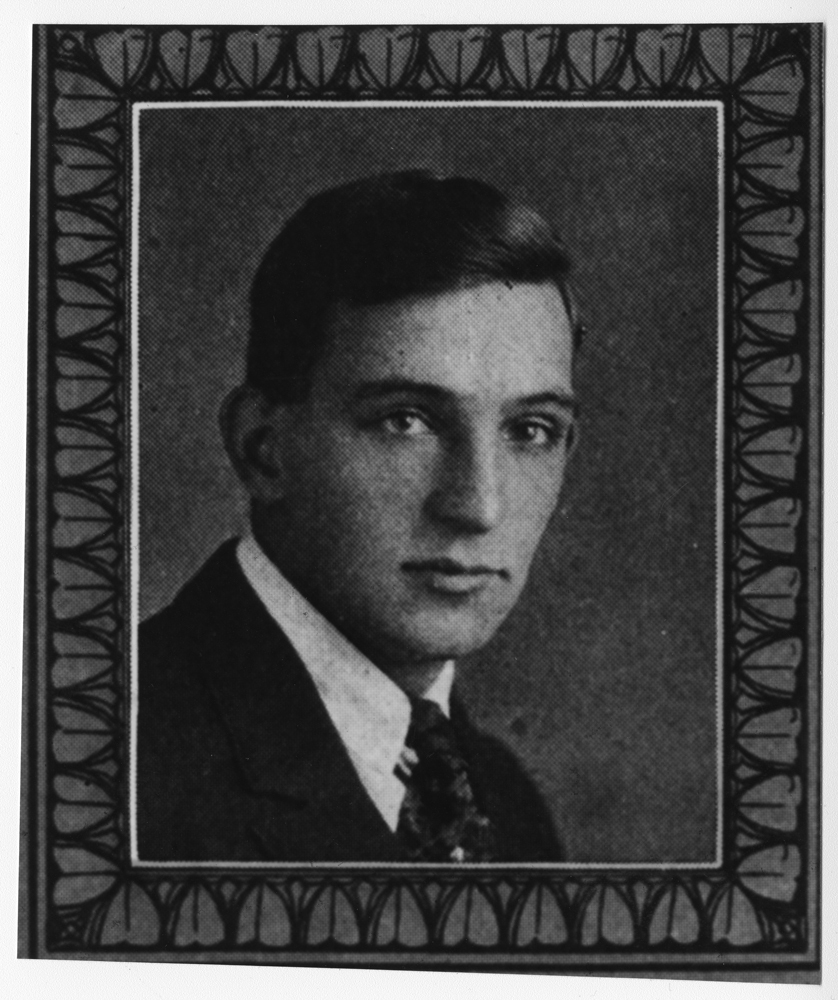
Al Staton of Georgia Tech.

The composite All-Southern eleven compiled from twenty four coaches and sporting editors of the South each of whom received trophies from the Atlanta Journal included:

- Red Barron, halfback for Georgia Tech, unanimous selection, second-team Camp All-American. Barron led Tech to a 14–6 defeat over one of Auburn's greatest teams. He was also an All-Southern baseball player who played professionally with the Boston Braves; and later coached high school football.
- Joe Bennett, tackle for Georgia, later a Coca-Cola executive. "Prior to the 1960s, Bennett is likely Georgia's most outstanding tackle." Both he and Whelchel were notorious kick blockers.
- Lynn Bomar, end for Vanderbilt, unanimous selection, second-team Camp All-American. He played with the New York Giants in their inaugural season and was later warden of Tennessee State Prison. Inducted into the College Football Hall of Fame in 1956.
- Herb Covington, quarterback for Centre, known as "The Mayfield Flash", had to replace Bo McMillin and kicked a record six straight drop-kicked field goals in a game against Louisville.
- Oscar Davis, guard for Georgia Tech, also selected All-American by Lawrence Perry and Billy Evans.
- John Fletcher, fullback for Georgia, provided much of the team's offense. An account of the game against Tennessee the next season says "he rammed the ball almost the entire length of the field on two occasions."
- Claire Frye, center for Georgia Tech, had formerly played football as a member of the American Expeditionary Forces.
- Red Roberts, end for Centre, last year the fifth southern player selected first-team All-American by Walter Camp. Later coached the Waynesburg Yellow Jackets.
- John Shirey, halfback for Auburn, was a member of various all-time Auburn teams.
- Albert Staton, tackle for Georgia Tech, is the starting end on the all-time Heisman era team.
- Puss Whelchel, guard for Georgia, and the unanimously elected captain from Georgia's strong line of '21. Both he and Bennett were notorious kick blockers.

=== Composite overview ===
Name	Position	School	First-team selections
Lynn Bomar	End/Tackle	Vanderbilt	24
Red Barron	Halfback	Georgia Tech	24
Oscar Davis	Guard	Georgia Tech	23
Herb Covington	Quarterback	Centre	22
John Shirey	Halfback	Auburn	22
Red Roberts	End/Guard/Tackle/Fullback	Centre	19
Albert Staton	Tackle	Georgia Tech	11
Joe Bennett	Tackle	Georgia	11
Claire Frye	Center	Georgia Tech	10
John Fletcher	Fullback	Georgia	9
Puss Whelchel	Guard	Georgia	8
James Pearce	Tackle/Guard	Auburn	7
Ed Kubale	Center	Centre	7
Shorty Propst	Center/Guard	Alabama	6
Scotty Neill	End	Vanderbilt	5
Rip Reagan	Guard	Auburn	5
Slick Moulton	End	Auburn	4
John Staton	End	Georgia Tech	3
Eddie Reed	Center	Tulane	3
Roe Campbell	Fullback	Tennessee	3
Al Clemens	End	Alabama	2
Jack Hovater	Tackle	Alabama	2
Thug Murray	Tackle	Sewanee	2
Tex Bradford	Tackle	Vanderbilt	2
Ed Sherling	Fullback	Auburn	2
Tarzan Holt	End	Tennessee	1
Cliff Lemon	End	Centre	1
Blood Miller	End	Sewanee	1
Crook Smith	End	Mercer	1
Edgar David	End	Oglethorpe	1
Charles R. Fenwick	Tackle	Virginia	1
Martin	Tackle	–	1
Tex Tilson	Tackle	VPI	1
Yen Lightsey	Tackle	Clemson	1
L. O. Wesley	Guard	Alabama	1
Ben Compton	Guard	Alabama	1
Birkett Pribble	Guard	Kentucky	1
Grady Pritchard	Guard	North Carolina	1
Tuck Kelly	Guard	Vanderbilt	1
Fats Lawrence	Center	Auburn	1
Johnson	Center	Mercer	1
Pooley Hubert	Fullback	Alabama	1
Red Johnston	Fullback	North Carolina	1

== All-Southerns of 1922 ==
=== Ends ===
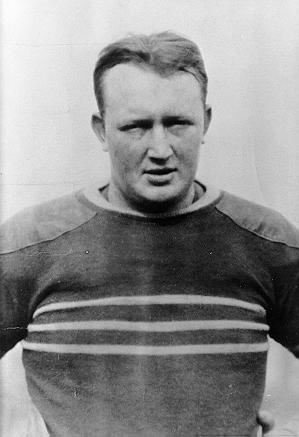
Red Roberts of Centre.

- Lynn Bomar†, Vanderbilt (College Football Hall of Fame) (C, BE, MA, ZN [as t], ED [as t], EH, MB, JP [as t], MM, GHB, BH, HGP, JB [as t], CWA, JH, NOI, NOS, CM, KS, WGF, MT[as t])
- Red Roberts, Centre (C, BE, MA, ED [as fb], MB [as g], EH, JP [as g], GHB, BH, HGP, JB, CWA, JH [as t], NOI [as t], NOS [as fb], CM [as t], KS [as t], WGF [as t], MT[as fb])
- John Staton, Georgia Tech (C, BE, ZN, ED, JP)
- Scotty Neill, Vanderbilt (C, BE, ZN, JH, WGF, MT)
- Slick Moulton, Auburn (C, BE, MB, NOI, NOS)
- Cliff Lemon, Centre (C, BE, JP, CM)
- Tarzan Holt, Tennessee (C, BE, JB, KS)
- Blood Miller, Sewanee (C, MM)
- Crook Smith, Mercer (C, MT)
- Edgar David, Oglethorpe (C)
- Terry Snowday, Centre (ED)

=== Tackles ===
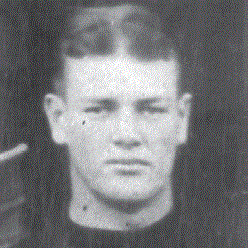
Joe Bennett

- Al Staton, Georgia Tech (C, BE, MA, ED, MB, HGP, JB, CWA, NOS, MT)
- Joe Bennett, Georgia (C, BE, MA, MB, GHB, CWA, JH, WGF)
- James Pearce, Auburn (C, BE, MM, GHB, NOI, KS)
- Thug Murray, Sewanee (C, BE, BH, HGP)
- Jack Hovater, Alabama (C, ZN, JP)
- Tex Bradford, Vanderbilt (C, BE, BH, NOS)
- Tex Tilson, VPI (C, BE, CM)
- Charles Fenwick, Virginia (C, EH)
- Yen Lightsey, Clemson (C)
- Martin

=== Guards ===
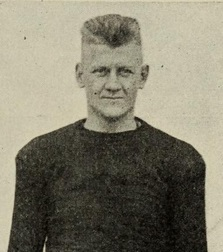
Puss Whelchel of Georgia.

- Oscar Davis, Georgia Tech (C, BE, MA [as g], ZN, ED, EH [as t], MB, JP, MM [as t], GHB, BH, HGP, JB, CWA, JH, NOI, NOS, KS, WGF, MT)
- Puss Whelchel, Georgia (C, BE, EH, MM, GHB, JH, NOI, NOS)
- Rip Reagan, Auburn (C, BE, ED, HGP, JB, CM, MT)
- L. O. Wesley, Alabama (C, BE, MM)
- Tuck Kelly, Vanderbilt (C, BE, BH)
- Birkett Pribble, Kentucky (C, BE, WGF)
- Ben Compton, Alabama (C)
- Grady Pritchard, North Carolina (C, KS)

=== Centers ===
- Claire Frye, Georgia Tech (C, BE, ZN [as g], ED, MB, JB, CM [as g])
- Ed Kubale, Centre (C, BE, JP, GHB, JH, CM, KS, WGF)
- Shorty Propst, Alabama, (C, BE, MA [as g], ZN, EH [as g], MM, HGP, CWA [as g])
- Eddie Reed, Tulane (C, BE, MA, EH, CWA, NOI, NOS)
- Fats Lawrence, Auburn (C)
- Johnson, Mercer (C, MT)

=== Quarterbacks ===
- Herb "Flash" Covington, Centre (C, BE, MA, ZN, ED, EH, MB, JP, MM, GHB, BH, HGP, JB, CWA, JH, NOI, NOS, CM, KS, WGF, MT)
- Charles Bartlett, Alabama (BE, MM [as hb])
- Doc Kuhn, Vanderbilt (BE)
- Dick Mulvehill, Georgia (BE)
- Jack McDonough, Georgia Tech (BE)

=== Halfbacks ===
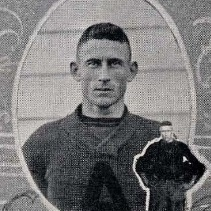
John Shirey of Auburn.

- Red Barron†, Georgia Tech (C, BE, MA, ZN, ED, EH, MB, JP, MM, GHB, BH, HGP, JB, CWA, JH, NOI, NOS, CM, KS, WGF, MT)
- John Shirey, Auburn (C, BE, MA, ZN, ED, EH [as fb], MB, JP, MM [as fb], GHB [as fb], BH, HGP, JB, CWA, JH, NOI, NOS, CM, WGF, MT)
- Gil Reese, Vanderbilt (BE, GHB)
- Ark Newton, Florida (EH, KS)
- Jimmy Brewster, Georgia Tech (BE)
- G. B. Arnold, Virginia (BE)

=== Fullbacks ===
- John Fletcher, Georgia (C, BE, MB, BH, HGP, CM)
- Ed Sherling, Auburn (C, BE, MA, ZN, JP, CWA)
- Roe Campbell, Tennessee (C, BE, JB, JH, KS, WGF)
- Pooley Hubert, Alabama (College Football Hall of Fame) (C)
- Red Johnston, North Carolina (C, NOI)
- Pinkey Hunt, Georgia Tech (BE)

== Key ==
Bold = Composite selection

* = Consensus All-American

† = Unanimous selection

C = received votes for the composite All-Southern eleven compiled from twenty four coaches and sporting editors of the South.

BE = Billy Evans's Southern Honor Roll.

MA = selected by the Montgomery Advertiser.

ZN = selected by Zipp Newman, sporting editor for the Birmingham News.

ED = selected by Ed Danforth, sporting editor for the Atlanta Georgian.

EH = selected by Ed Hebert of the Times-Picayune.

MB = selected by Morgan Blake, sporting editor for the Atlanta Journal.

JP = selected by J. P. Paterson, former Auburn star.

MM = selected by Marvin McCarthy, sporting editor of the Birmingham Age-Herald.

GHB = selected by George H. Butler of the Chattanooga News.

BH = selected by Blinkey Horn, sporting editor of the Nashville Tennessean.

HGP = selected by H. G. Pannell of the Montgomery Journal.

JB = selected by Jimmy Burns of the Knoxville Journal-Tribune.

CWA = selected by Carlyle Ward of the Montgomery Journal.

JH = selected by Joe Hatcher of the Nashville Tennessean.

NOI = selected by the New Orleans Item.

NOS = selected by Henry Reiter of the New Orleans Daily States.

CM = selected by Centre coach Charley Moran

KS = selected by the Knoxville Sentinel

WGF = selected W. G. Foster and S. J. McAllister in the Chattanooga Times.

MT = selected by the Macon Telegraph

== See also ==
- 1922 College Football All-America Team
