= 1921 Georgia Bulldogs football team =

American college football season

1921 Georgia Bulldogs football

SIAA co-champion
- Conference: Southern Intercollegiate Athletic Association
- Record: 7–2–1 (6–0–1 SIAA)
- Head coach: Herman Stegeman (2nd season)
- Captain: Owen Reynolds
- Home stadium: Sanford Field

Uniform
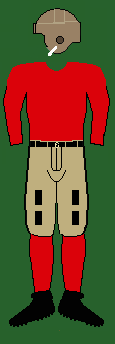

1921 Southern Intercollegiate Athletic Association football standings
	Conf.					Overall
Team	W		L		T	W		L		T
Centre +	5	–	0	–	0	10	–	1	–	0
Georgia +	6	–	0	–	1	7	–	2	–	1
Georgia Tech +	5	–	0	–	0	8	–	1	–	0
Vanderbilt +	5	–	0	–	1	7	–	0	–	1
Tennessee	4	–	1	–	1	6	–	2	–	1
Florida	4	–	1	–	2	6	–	3	–	2
Mississippi College	3	–	1	–	1	7	–	2	–	1
Sewanee	4	–	2	–	0	6	–	2	–	0
Transylvania	2	–	1	–	0	4	–	4	–	0
LSU	2	–	1	–	1	6	–	1	–	1
South Carolina	2	–	1	–	1	5	–	1	–	2
Furman	4	–	2	–	1	7	–	2	–	1
Auburn	3	–	2	–	0	5	–	3	–	0
Mississippi A&M	2	–	3	–	1	4	–	4	–	1
Tulane	3	–	4	–	0	4	–	6	–	0
Alabama	2	–	4	–	2	5	–	4	–	2
Oglethorpe	2	–	4	–	0	5	–	4	–	0
Chattanooga	2	–	4	–	0	4	–	6	–	0
The Citadel	1	–	2	–	1	3	–	3	–	2
Kentucky	1	–	3	–	1	4	–	3	–	1
Ole Miss	1	–	4	–	0	3	–	6	–	0
Howard (AL)	1	–	4	–	0	3	–	6	–	0
Mercer	1	–	5	–	0	3	–	6	–	0
Louisville	0	–	1	–	0	2	–	2	–	1
Wofford	0	–	2	–	0	2	–	7	–	0
Georgetown (KY)	0	–	3	–	0	2	–	6	–	0
Millsaps	0	–	3	–	0	1	–	5	–	1
Clemson	0	–	5	–	2	1	–	6	–	2
+ – Conference co-champions

The 1921 Georgia Bulldogs football team represented the University of Georgia during the 1921 college football season. This was the team's second season under the guidance of head coach Herman Stegeman. The Bulldogs had a 7–2–1 record, and were also co-champion of the Southern Intercollegiate Athletic Association: co-champions Georgia Tech and Vanderbilt were also undefeated. Vanderbilt tied Georgia with an onside kick in their game which decided conference title. The Bulldogs' only two losses came against two of the football powerhouses of the day, Eastern schools Harvard and Dartmouth.

All season, not a single team scored through its line, which was the greatest in the South, and featured four All-Southern players. Guard Hugh Whelchel was selected a third-team All-American by Walter Camp.

== Schedule ==
Date	Opponent	Site	Result	Attendance	Source
October 1	Mercer	Sanford Field; Athens, GA	W 28–0		
October 8	Furman	Sanford Field; Athens, GA	W 27–7		
October 15	at Harvard*	Harvard Stadium; Boston, MA	L 7–10	25,000	
October 22	Oglethorpe	Sanford Field; Athens, GA	W 14–0		
October 29	vs. Auburn	A. J. McClung Memorial Stadium; Columbus, GA (rivalry)	W 7–0		
November 5	Virginia*	Sanford Field; Athens, GA	W 21–0		
November 12	at Vanderbilt	Dudley Field; Nashville, TN (rivalry)	T 7–7		
November 19	vs. Alabama	Ponce de Leon Park; Atlanta, GA (rivalry)	W 22–0		
November 24	Clemson	Sanford Field; Athens, GA (rivalry)	W 28–0		
November 26	vs. Dartmouth*	Grant Field; Atlanta, GA	L 0–7		
*Non-conference game

== Before the season ==
On the line with Whelchel were captain and end Owen Reynolds, tackles Artie Pew and Joe Bennett, and center Bum Day. According to Patrick Garbin, "Prior to the 1960s, Bennett is likely Georgia's most outstanding tackle."

== Game summaries ==
=== Mercer ===
The season opened with a 28–0 defeat of Josh Cody's Mercer Baptists. The starting lineup was O. Reynolds (left end), Bennett (left tackle), Whelchel (left guard), Day (center), Anthony (right guard), Pew (right tackle), Murray (right end), Pierce (quarterback), Reynolds (left halfback), Spicer (right halfback), and Collings (fullback)

=== Furman ===
In the second week of play, Georgia beat Furman 27–7. Jim Tom Reynolds provided the feature play when he returned an interception 40 yards to set up a touchdown.

The starting lineup was Reynolds (left end), Bennett (left tackle), Whelchel (left guard), Day (center), Anthony (right guard), Pew (right tackle), Murray (right end), Randall (quarterback), Fletcher (left halfback), Spicer (right halfback), Tanner (fullback).

=== At Harvard ===
Georgia at Harvard

Team	1	2	3	4	Total
Georgia	0	0	0	7	7
• Harvard	7	3	0	0	10

- Date: October 15
- Location: Harvard Stadium
  Boston, Massachusetts
- Game attendance: 25,000
- Referee: W. G. Crowell (Swarthmore)

The Bulldogs traveled north and were defeated by the eastern power Harvard Crimson 10–7. They were the first team all season to score on the Crimson. Harvard won by a blocked punt recovery and a drop kicked field goal. A triple pass from Collings to Jim Reynolds to Dick Hartley in the final period got Georgia's touchdown.

The starting lineup was O. Reynolds (left end), Bennett (left tackle), Whelchel (left guard), Day (center), Anthony (right guard), Pew (right tackle), Murray (right end), Randall (quarterback), Fletcher (left halfback), Hartley (right halfback), and Spicer (fullback).

=== Oglethorpe ===
Georgia easily defeated the in-state Oglethorpe Stormy Petrels 14–0. The starting lineup was Bennett (left end), Colley (left tackle), Whelchel (left guard), Boney (center), Vandiver (right guard), Williams (right tackle), Richardson (right end), Pearce (quarterback), Clark (left halfback), Thompson (right halfback), Tanner (fullback).

=== Auburn ===
Auburn at Georgia

Team	1	2	3	4	Total
Auburn	0	0	0	0	0
• Georgia	0	0	0	7	7

- Date: October 15
- Location: Columbus, Georgia

Georgia beat the heavily favored Auburn team 7–0 when Teany Randall scored in the final period.

The starting lineup was Reynolds (left end), Bennett (left tackle), Whelchel (left guard), Day (center), Anthony (right guard), Pew (right tackle), P. Bennett (right end), Randall (quarterback), Hartley (left halfback), Spicer (right halfback), Fletcher (fullback).

=== Virginia ===
The Bulldogs shutout the Virginia Orange and Blue 21–0. UVA presented Georgia with a memorial tablet to Richard Von Albade Gammon.

The starting lineup was Reynolds (left end), Bennett (left tackle), Whelchel (left guard), Day (center), Anthony (right guard), Pew (right tackle), Murray (right end), Collings (quarterback), Hartley (left halfback), J. Reynolds (right halfback), Tanner (fullback).

=== At Vanderbilt ===
Georgia at Vanderbilt

Team	1	2	3	4	Total
Georgia	0	7	0	0	7
Vanderbilt	0	0	0	7	7

- Date: November 12
- Location: Curry Field
  Nashville, Tennessee

In the seventh week of play, the Bulldogs faced the Vanderbilt Commodores at Curry Field. The game was the highlight of Vanderbilt's schedule this year, deciding the conference champion, and was described by The New York Times as an "important clash"; another source called it a "tooth and toe nail event." Birmingham News sports editor "Zipp" Newman wrote weeks before the game, "Stegeman has a powerful team and with all the regulars in the game, the team has a chance of going through the season undefeated unless it be Vanderbilt that stops her".

Vanderbilt's record against Georgia was 6–1; Georgia's only win was 4–0, in 1898, and the all-time score was 184–4 in favor of the Commodores. The Bulldogs were favored to win their first meeting since 1912. In the first quarter, both teams were evenly matched. The Commodores had their best chance to score when Thomas Ryan beat the defense, but he dropped Jess Neely's pass. Vanderbilt had another chance to score when a Georgia field goal was blocked by Lynn Bomar and picked up by Tot McCullough, who was caught from behind before he could score.

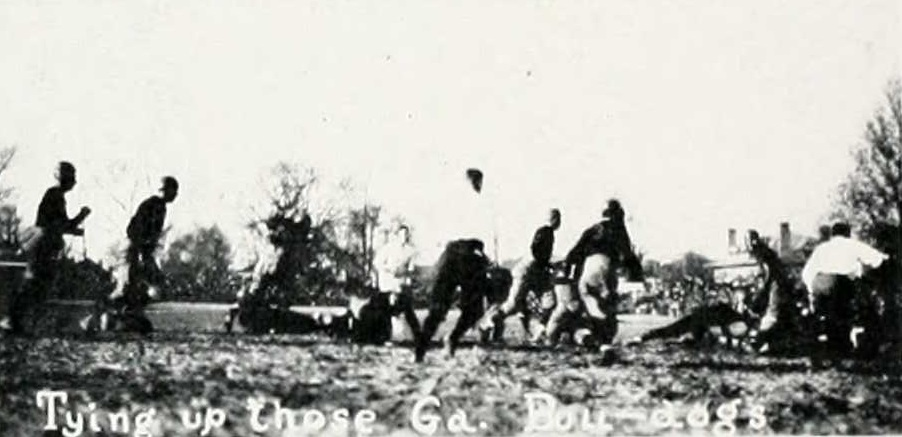
Vanderbilt tying the score

In the second quarter, Georgia outplayed Vanderbilt. The Commodores had two first downs in the first half, both because of Bulldog penalties. A Commodore punt was returned 15 yards by Georgia to the Vanderbilt 30-yard line, and the Bulldogs completed an 18-yard pass from Dick Hartley to halfback Jim Tom Reynolds on Vanderbilt's 12-yard line. After three short gains, Hartley advanced five yards and Vanderbilt was penalized for being offside. Jim Reynolds, gaining a yard or so, went over for the touchdown with a counter on the following series; the close call was disputed. At the end of the half, Georgia had gained 113 yards to Vanderbilt's nine.

The teams were as evenly matched in the third quarter as they had been in the first, with Vanderbilt gaining only two first downs. Soon after the start of the fourth quarter Neely intercepted a pass, weaving for a 25-yard return to Georgia's 40-yard line. Two long pass attempts failed, and Thomas Ryan lined up to punt. Rupert Smith sneaked in behind Ryan, rushing to recover the 25-yard onside kick from scrimmage. Smith jumped up to get the ball from a horde of Bulldogs after they let it bounce, and raced for a 15-yard touchdown. After he added an extra point, the game ended in a 7–7 tie. (Note: One source credits Vanderbilt with the first successful onside kick in the history of football, despite the fact the onside kick was legalized in 1906, and the first one in the South was executed by Auburn against Georgia in 1896.)

Lynn Bomar's play as a linebacker was noted. According to Nashville Tennessean sportswriter Blinkey Horn, "Georgia would have trampled Vanderbilt to atoms but for Lynn Bomar ... [who] was the stellar performer of the game. In the first-half he made two-thirds of the tackles"; Bomar stopped five Georgia touchdowns that day. Tom Ryan's punting was also key to keeping the game close, despite the Bulldogs' 18 first downs. The starting lineup was O. Reynolds (left end), Bennett (left tackle), Whelchel (left guard), Day (center), Vandiver (right guard), Pew (right tackle), Murray (right end), J. Reynolds (quarterback), Randall (left halfback), Thompson (right halfback), and Collings (fullback).

=== Alabama ===
Alabama at Georgia

Team	1	2	3	4	Total
Alabama	0	0	0	0	0
• Georgia	7	0	0	15	22

- Date: November 20
- Location: Ponce de Leon Park
  Atlanta
- Referee: Jogger Elcock

On a muddy Ponce de Leon Park, Georgia handily defeated the Alabama Crimson Tide 22–0. Jim Reynolds scored first for Georgia. After Whelchel blocked a Charles Bartlett punt, Bartlett fell on it for a safety. After another punt block, Day recovered the ball deep in Alabama territory, and eventually Spicer ran in a touchdown. In the fourt quarter, the Bulldogs had an 80-yard touchdown drive. Randall and Spicer made 20 yards on end runs, and pass from Hartley to Randall netted 30 yards, down to the 3-yard line, from where Randall scored.

The starting lineup was O. Reynolds (left end), Bennett (left tackle), Whelchel (left guard), Day (center), Anthony (right guard), Pew (right tackle), P. Bennett (right end), Fitts (quarterback), Thompson (left halfback), Spicer (right halfback), and Collings (fullback).

=== Clemson ===
Clemson was beaten 28–0. The starting lineup was O. Reynolds (left end), Bennett (left tackle), Whelchel (left guard), Day (center), Anthony (right guard), Pew (right tackle), P. Bennett (right end), Randall (quarterback), Hartley (left halfback), Spicer (right halfback), and Tanner (fullback).

=== Dartmouth ===
Dartmouth at Georgia

Team	1	2	3	4	Total
• Dartmouth	0	7	0	0	7
Georgia	0	0	0	0	0

- Date: November 26
- Location: Grant Field
  Atlanta

Georgia was beaten by eastern power Dartmouth 7–0. Dartmouth scored on a 64-yard forward pass that went 44 in the air, from Jim Robertson to Lynch. Dick Hartley fumbled twice.

== Arter the season ==
Whelchel was elected captain for the next year.

== Players ==
=== Varsity letterwinners ===
==== Line ====
Player	Position	Games started	Hometown	Prep school	Height	Weight	Age
Thurston Anthony	tackle						
Joe Bennett	tackle		Statesboro, Georgia			180	20
Sam Boney	center						
Bum Day	center		Nashville, Georgia	Porter Military Academy	5'10"	190	23
Ike Joselove	center						
Artie Pew	tackle		Damascus, Georgia			195	23
Owen Reynolds	end		Douglasville, Georgia		6'3"	180	
Jim Taylor	tackle		Hazlehurst, Georgia				
Nemo Vandiver	guard						
Hugh Whelchel	guard		Dahlonega, Georgia			200	21

==== Backfield ====
Player	Position	Games started	Hometown	Prep school	Height	Weight	Age
Dave Collings	halfback						
John H. Fletcher	fullback		Tifton, Georgia			200	
Dick Hartley	halfback		Fort Valley, Georgia				
Dick Mulvehill	quarterback						
Teany Randall	halfback						
Jim Tom Reynolds	halfback						

==== Unlisted ====
Player	Position	Games started	Hometown	Prep school	Height	Weight	Age
Paul Anderson
Jacob Butler
Hervey Cleckley
Dan Post
Sam Richardson
James D. Thomason
