= Shirey =

Shirey is a surname. Notable people with the surname include:

- Bill Shirey (born 1932), American racing driver
- Duke Shirey (1898–1962), American baseball player
- Fred Shirey (1916-1961), American football player
- Hilbert Shirey, American poker player
- John Shirey (1898–1966), American college football player and engineer
- Mark Shirey, member of the Alabama House of Representatives
- Sxip Shirey, American electric-acoustic composer, performer, and story-teller
