= Ben Compton =

Ben Compton can refer to:

- Ben Compton (American football)
- Ben Compton (cricketer)
