= 1924 College Football All-Southern Team =

American all-star college football team

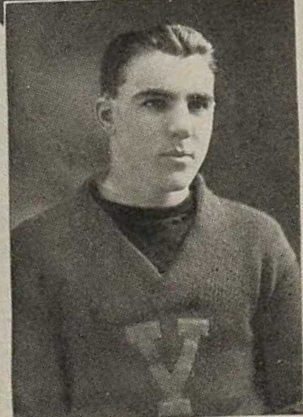
Hek Wakefield of Vanderbilt.

The 1924 College Football All-Southern Team consists of American football players selected to the College Football All-Southern Teams selected by various organizations for the 1924 Southern Conference football season.

Alabama won the SoCon championship. Centre defeated Alabama and claims a Southern championship, even though Centre was never a member of the Southern Conference.

== Composite eleven ==
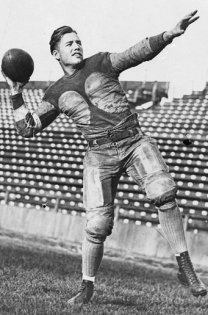
Doug Wycoff of Georgia Tech.

The composite All-Southern eleven compiled by the Atlanta Journal included:

- Goldy Goldstein, tackle for Florida. Goldstein was one of the first Jews to ever play for the Gators. He played professionally for the Newark Bears of the first American Football League (AFL), and was later an attorney practicing in Miami Beach.
- Pooley Hubert, halfback for Alabama, inducted into the College Football Hall of Fame in 1964. While he was his team's best passer, he was also heralded as one of the game's best ever defensive backs. Coach Wallace Wade called him "undoubtedly one of the greatest football players of all time."
- Edgar C. Jones, quarterback for Florida, later athletic director at his alma mater and a banker.
- Fats Lawrence, center for Auburn. An all-time Auburn team notes ""Big" Thigpen", "Tubby" Lockwood, and "Fats" Lawrence were man-mountains."
- Clyde Propst, center for Alabama, known as "Shorty," second team All-American selection of Lawrence Perry. He later coached, once head coach at Howard and Southwestern.
- Gil Reese, "the Tupelo flash", halfback for Vanderbilt, scored in the 16–0 victory over Minnesota. He was selected a third-team All-American by Norman E. Brown.
- Bob Rives, tackle for Vanderbilt. Rives was considered the greatest football player ever to come out of Hopkinsville High School in Hopkinsville, Kentucky. He played professionally for the Newark Bears and later was for several years a referee for high school football games throughout Tennessee.
- Jim Taylor, tackle for Georgia, also selected a third-team All-American by Norman E. Brown.
- Smack Thompson, end for Georgia. Brother of Charlie Thompson.
- Henry Wakefield, end for Vanderbilt, known as "Hek," second-team Walter Camp All-American. As an interim team captain following the loss of both Kelly and Bomar to injuries, he scored twice in the Commodores' 13–0 win over the Auburn Tigers, and defeated the Georgia Tech Yellow Jackets 3–0 with a 37-yard drop-kick field goal. He also played every minute of an inspired game against Minnesota.
- Doug Wycoff, fullback for Georgia Tech. Coach Alexander recalled "The work of Douglas Wycoff against Notre Dame two years in succession was brilliant in the extreme, as was his plunging against Penn State when we defeated them twice." Wycoff played professionally for various teams in both the AFL and NFL including with the Newark Bears. He was inducted into the Georgia Sports Hall of Fame in 1978.

== All-Southerns of 1924 ==
=== Ends ===
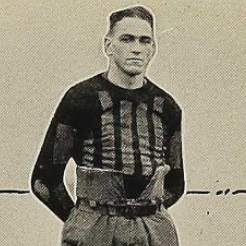
Bob Rives

- Hek Wakefield*, Vanderbilt (C, C2, AS, NB-1, CH-1, FH, UGA, VU, BE)
- Smack Thompson, Georgia (C, C2, CH-2, UGA, BE)
- Cliff Lemon, Centre (NB-2, AS, CH-1, VU, BE)
- G. B. Ollinger, Auburn (NB-1)
- King, Georgia Tech (FH)
- James Kay Thomas, Washington (BE)
- Ab Kirwan, Kentucky (CH-2, BE)
- Joe Tilghman, Furman (NB-2)

=== Tackles ===
- Bob Rives, Vanderbilt (C, C2, NB-1, CH-1, FH, VU, BE)
- Jim Taylor, Georgia (C, C2, NB-1, CH-2, FH, UGA, VU, BE)
- Red Simmons, Mercer (NB-1, UGA)
- Walter Skidmore, Centre (AS, CH-2)
- Minos Gordy, Centre (CH-1)
- Curtis Luckey, Georgia (NB-2)
- Samuel Oscar Graham, VPI (NB-2)
- Cy Williams, Florida (BE)
- Noisy Grisham, Auburn (BE)

=== Guards ===
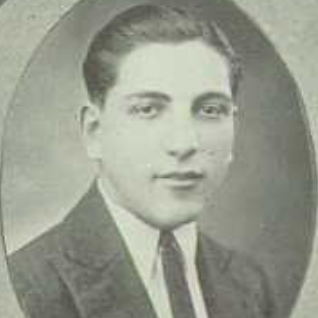
Goldy Goldstein of Florida.

- Goldy Goldstein, Florida (C, C2, AS, NB-2, FH, UGA, BE)
- Ben Compton, Alabama (C2, CH-1, BE)
- Ike Joselove, Georgia (NB-2, UGA, VU)
- Walt Godwin, Georgia Tech (VU, BE)
- Bill Buckler, Alabama (NB-1)
- J. Lawrence, Tulane (NB-1)
- George Gardner, Georgia Tech (VU)
- Earl McFaden, Auburn (VU)
- Fatty Lawrence, Vanderbilt (VU, BE)
- Lynch, Centre (CH-2)
- Irish Levy, Tulane (BE)

=== Centers ===
- Fats Lawrence, Auburn (C [as g], C2, AS [as g], CH-2 [as g], FH, VU, BE)
- Shorty Propst, Alabama (C, AS [as g], NB-1, CH-1 [as g], FH [as g], UGA, VU [as g], BE)
- Ed Kubale, Centre (AS, NB-1, CH-1, BE)

=== Quarterbacks ===
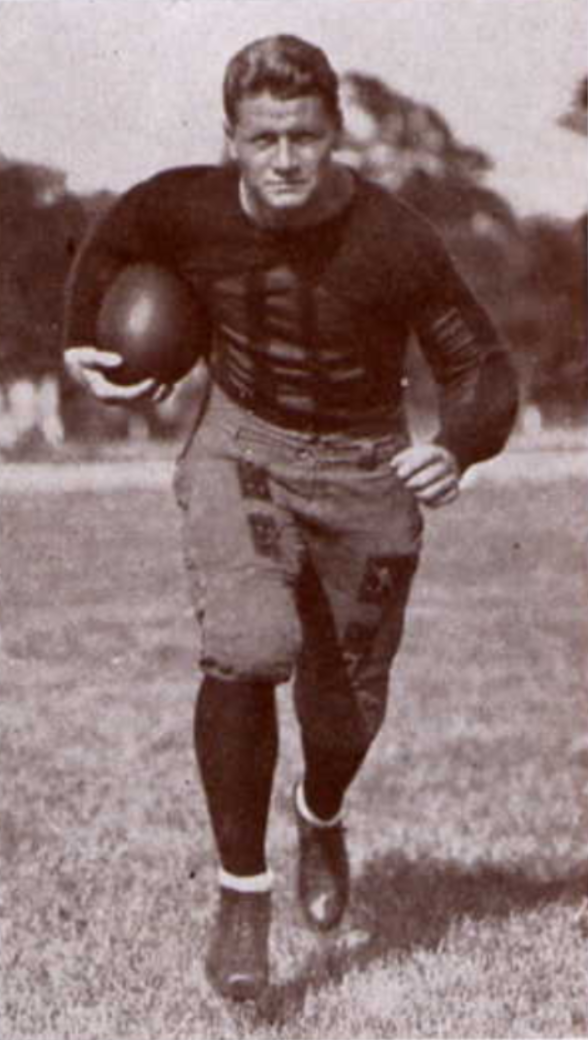
Edgar C. Jones of Florida.

- Edgar C. Jones, Florida (C, C2, AS [as hb], FH, UGA [as hb], VU, BE)
- Herb Covington, Centre (AS, NB-1, UGA, BE)
- Scrappy Moore, Georgia (CH-2)
- Grant Gillis, Alabama (NB-2)
- A. C. Carter Diffey, Virginia (BE)
- Lester Lautenschlaeger, Tulane (BE)

=== Halfbacks ===
- Pooley Hubert, Alabama (College Football Hall of Fame) (C, C2, CH-1, FH, BE)
- Gil Reese, Vanderbilt (C, C2, AS, NB-1, CH-2, VU, BE)
- Brother Brown, Tulane (NB-1, CH-2 [as fb], VU, BE)
- Ark Newton, Florida (FH, BE)
- Martin Kilpatrick, Georgia (NB-2, UGA)
- David Rosenfeld, Alabama (NB-2)
- Johnny Mack Brown, Alabama (CH-2)

=== Fullbacks ===
- Doug Wycoff, Georgia Tech (C, C2, AS, NB-1, FH, UGA, VU)
- Tom Ryan, Vanderbilt (VU [as hb], BE)
- James D. Thomason, Georgia (NB-2)
- Eddie Cameron, Washington & Lee (BE)

== Key ==
Bold = Consensus selection

* = Consensus All-American

C = Composite selections from the Atlanta Journal.

C2 = A second composite selection. Both were drawn by writers from Birmingham, Atlanta, Louisville, Nashville, Memphis, Chattanooga, New Orleans, Montgomery, Shreveport, Knoxville, Jacksonville, Columbus, and Columbia.

AS = selected by Anniston coaches and The Anniston Star.

NB = selected by Norman E. Brown.

CH = selected by Happy Chandler, scout for the Centre Colonels football team.

FH = selected by Fox Howe, coach of AMI.

UGA = received most votes at their position by the players of the Georgia Bulldogs football team.

VU = received votes at their position by the players of the Vanderbilt Commodores football team.

BE = Billy Evans's "Southern Honor Roll"

== See also ==
- 1924 College Football All-America Team
