= Charles Bartlett (American football) =

American football player (1899–1964)

Profile
- Position: Halfback/Quarterback

Personal information
- Born: June 14, 1899; Marlin, Texas
- Died: March 29, 1965 (aged 65); Marlin, Texas

Career information
- College: Alabama (1919–1922)

Awards and highlights
- All-Southern (1922); All-America Honorable Mention (1922)

Charles Henry "Stumpy" Bartlett (June 14, 1899 – March 29, 1965) was a college football player.

== Early life ==
Bartlett was from Marlin, Texas.

== University of Alabama ==
Bartlett was a prominent halfback and quarterback for Xen C. Scott's Alabama Crimson Tide football teams of the University of Alabama.

=== 1922 ===
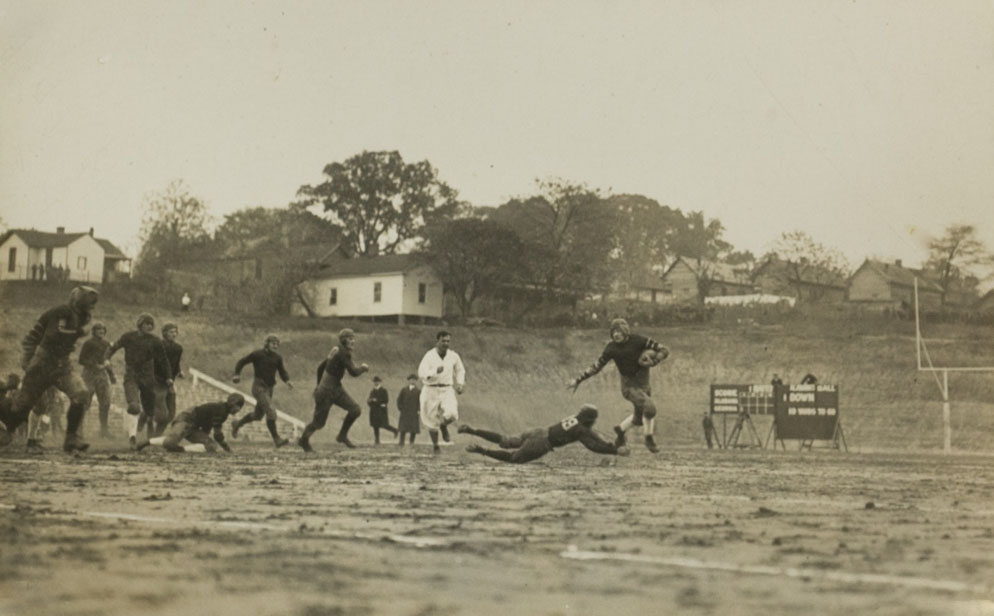
Bartlett running around end against Georgia.

Bartlett starred in the first ever meeting against the Oglethorpe Stormy Petrels in 1922. Alabama won 41–0 before 3,000 fans at Tuscaloosa. Bartlett scored five of their six touchdowns in the victory. He scored touchdowns on a 26-yard run in the first, a 15-yard reception from Hulet Whitaker in the second, and on a pair of runs in the third and one in the fourth. In the tie against Sewanee, Bartlett threw a 60-yard touchdown pass to Allen MacCartee. The upset of Penn 9–7 on November 4 was the highlight of the year. Alabama's own website has this account of the winning drive: "Alabama came back strong in the second quarter on the back of leader Charles Bartlett. Bartlett drove the team down the field on most notably a 22 yard run from the 27 that put the ball on the Penn 4 yard line. Pooley Hubert went in the rest of the way but fumbled the ball in the endzone. Shorty Propst recovered the ball and gave Alabama the 9-7 lead that they would never give up." The next week Alabama beat LSU 47–3 in what was then the largest crowd ever to witness a game at Denny Field. Bartlett was responsible for three touchdowns. Bartlett was selected for the All-Southern team of Marvin McCarthy, sporting editor for the Birmingham Age-Herald, and given honorable mention on the All-America team of Walter Camp.

== See also ==
- 1922 College Football All-Southern Team
