= Clare Frye =

American football player (1899–1971)

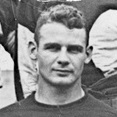
- Frye cropped from team picture, 1922

Profile
- Position: Center

Personal information
- Born: May 10, 1899; Oklahoma City, Oklahoma, US
- Died: October 16, 1971 (aged 72); Fairfax, Virginia, US
- Listed weight: 160 lb (73 kg)

Career information
- College: Georgia Tech (1920–1923)

Awards and highlights
- All-Southern (1922, 1923)

Clare Alanson Frye (May 10, 1899 – October 16, 1971) was an American college football player who starred as a center for the Georgia Tech Yellow Jackets from 1920 to 1923. During his collegiate career, Frye earned recognition as a standout lineman, contributing to the team's efforts in the Southern Conference and receiving All-Southern honors in 1922 and 1923.

Frye's playing style was noted for its tenacity and skill in the trenches, helping anchor Georgia Tech's offensive and defensive lines during an era when the Yellow Jackets were a dominant force in Southern football under coach William Alexander. In 1923, he was involved in a publicized off-field incident in Atlanta alongside fellow Georgia Tech athletes, highlighting the scrutiny faced by prominent student-athletes of the time. Retrospective rankings place him at #377 among college football players of the 1920s.

== Early life and education ==
=== Birth and family ===
Clare Alanson Frye was born on May 10, 1899, in Oklahoma City, Oklahoma, U.S. He was named after County Clare, a county in Munster in the Southern part of Ireland.

=== Pre-college education ===
Frye attended Oklahoma City High School. During his high school years, he played football on the school's team, though he was lightweight at the time. Prior to enrolling at Georgia Tech, Frye served two years in the U.S. Army, which helped build his physical strength.

== Military service ==
Frye enlisted in the United States Army in 1915 at the age of 16, falsifying his records in order to serve ahead of the United States' official involvement in World War I. He volunteered for service amid the national mobilization, reflecting the widespread response to President Woodrow Wilson's call to arms following Germany's unrestricted submarine warfare.

After completing basic training stateside, Frye was deployed overseas with the American Expeditionary Forces (AEF) under General John J. Pershing, arriving in France by mid-1917 as part of the initial wave of American troops bolstering Allied efforts on the Western Front. His role was that of an infantryman, contributing to the AEF's buildup during a period of intense combat, including the Meuse-Argonne Offensive in late 1918.

Frye returned to service during World War II as commander of Naval Mobile Construction Battalion 26, supporting operations in the Pacific Theater and overseeing critical construction projects that contributed to the Allied campaign on Guadalcanal.

== Football in the American Expeditionary Forces ==
During his military service in World War I, Frye played football for teams within the AEF stationed in France from 1917 to 1918, leveraging his pre-enlistment athletic background to contribute at a high level. Frye earned selection as the All-AEF center, a recognition highlighting his standout performance among soldiers across the expeditionary units. In this position, he was responsible for snapping the ball to start offensive plays, calling defensive alignments, and serving as the anchor of the line to disrupt opposing rushes.

His play featured in key inter-unit and Allied service games, including matchups against British and French military squads, where Frye's compact 160-pound build allowed him to excel in trench-like line battles, holding ground against larger opponents and facilitating quick defensive shifts. These wartime experiences sharpened Frye's leadership on the field, and built his physical toughness amid the rigors of overseas service.

== College football career ==
=== 1921 season at Georgia Tech ===
Frye joined Georgia Tech in 1920 as a freshman and spent that year as a scrub, practicing with the junior varsity team. He earned his first varsity letter during the 1921 season, transitioning to the main roster as a center under head coach William Alexander. Alexander, who had assumed the head coaching role in 1920 after serving as an assistant to John Heisman, guided the Yellow Jackets to an impressive 8-1 record that year, with the team's only loss coming in a close contest against a strong out-of-conference opponent. The Jackets dominated Southern Conference play, going 2-0, and scored a total of 360 points while allowing just 56, highlighting the effectiveness of Alexander's jump shift offensive scheme, which emphasized quick line movements and powerful runs, elements influenced by the evolving national styles seen in contemporaries like Knute Rockne's Notre Dame teams.

As a backup center, Frye appeared in four games during the 1921 season, contributing to line play and snaps in relief of the starter. His limited but steady role helped maintain the integrity of the offensive and defensive fronts in key victories, such as the 38-0 shutout of North Carolina and the 21-0 win over Auburn, allowing the team to control the tempo and protect the backfield effectively. Frye's military football background provided a disciplined approach to his position, aiding his quick adaptation to Alexander's system, which prioritized physicality and precision in the trenches. The season represented a solid foundation for Frye, as Georgia Tech finished ranked 10th nationally and set the stage for stronger performances in the years ahead.

=== 1922 season and All-Southern honors ===
In 1922, Frye solidified his role as the starting center for the Georgia Tech Yellow Jackets, anchoring the line during a 7–2 season in which the team outscored opponents 157–59. The Yellow Jackets secured notable victories, including a 14–6 win over rival Auburn on Thanksgiving Day, contributing to their undefeated 4–0 Southern Conference mark. Frye's leadership on the offensive line and defensive contributions earned him widespread recognition among Southern sports writers. He was selected to the composite All-Southern team, receiving 10 votes for center in a poll of 24 coaches and editors, more than Ed Kubale's 6 votes and outpacing Clyde Propst, who tallied 9 votes but primarily for guard. Georgia Tech placed the most players on the mythical eleven, with four selections including Frye, highlighting the team's dominant line play that season.

=== 1923 season ===
In 1923, Frye returned as the starting center for the Georgia Tech Golden Tornado in his senior year, anchoring the offensive and defensive lines during a season marked by defensive solidity but inconsistent results. The team, coached by William Alexander, finished with a 3–2–4 record, securing wins against Oglethorpe (28–13) and VMI (10–7) early on before tying Florida (7–7) and suffering a decisive 35–7 loss to Notre Dame on the road. Frye played in six of the nine games, providing stability in the trenches amid a schedule that included four ties, such as scoreless draws with Alabama and Auburn, and a narrow 7–0 defeat at Penn State. His role was crucial in maintaining line integrity during several low-scoring affairs that highlighted the team's resilient but limited offensive output of just 75 points across the season.

Frye's consistent performance earned him a second consecutive All-Southern selection, following his 1922 honor, and he was named to teams by multiple selectors including the Atlanta Constitution and Birmingham News. This repeat recognition underscored his reliability as a pivot in the South's competitive conferences, where he excelled in snapping and blocking duties. Over his three-year varsity career from 1921 to 1923, Frye earned three letters and participated in approximately 20 games, solidifying his status as one of Georgia Tech's standout linemen of the era.

== Public controversy ==
In February 1923, during his senior year at Georgia Tech, Frye was accused of participating in an assault alongside three other young men. Carl Davis, an Atlanta resident, alleged that Frye, J. E. Fincher (an Emory University student), "Puh" McWhorter (another Georgia Tech football player), and Henry Lyons (a local clubman) abducted him from the YMCA, beat him severely, and forced him to kneel and apologize to a society girl for an alleged insult uttered during a dance. Davis denied insulting the woman, claiming his oath was not directed at her. Peace warrants were issued, and the four men posted $200 bonds each to appear in police court on charges of disorderly conduct. No further legal outcomes are documented in contemporary reports.

== Later life and death ==
Frye eventually settled in Mount Vernon, Virginia. He died on October 16, 1971 at the age of 72 and survived by his wife and two children. Frye was buried at Arlington National Cemetery.
