= Hugh Whelchel =

American football player (1900–1968)

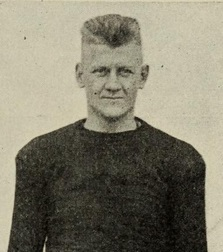
- Whelchel c. 1921 "Puss"

No. 45 – Georgia Bulldogs
- Position: Guard

Personal information
- Born: July 20, 1900; Dahlonega, Georgia, U.S.
- Died: April 1, 1968 (aged 67); Sanford, Florida, U.S.
- Listed weight: 200 lb (91 kg)

Career information
- College: Georgia (1919–1922)

Awards and highlights
- SIAA championship (1920, 1921); All-Southern (1920, 1921, 1922); Third-team All-American (1921)

Hugh Calvin "Puss" Whelchel (July 20, 1900 – April 1, 1968) was an American college football player.

== Early life ==
Hugh was born on July 20, 1900, in Dahlonega, Georgia, to Henry Cowan Whelchel and Clara Annabel Moore. Hugh was a first cousin of Georgia Tech football player Dan Whelchel.

== University of Georgia ==
He was a prominent guard for the Georgia Bulldogs of the University of Georgia from 1919 to 1922. He was said to have blocked 19 kicks in his college football career. Whelchel was a member of the Alpha Tau Omega fraternity. He was nominated though not selected for an Associated Press All-Time Southeast 1869-1919 era team.

=== 1920 ===
His kick blocking featured in the 21–14 victory over Alabama in 1920. Buck Cheves returned the block 87 yards for a touchdown and the win, ranked fourth in The 50 Greatest Plays In Georgia Bulldogs Football History. Georgia was 8–0–1 and SIAA champions in 1920, as well as the first team known as the "Bulldogs."

=== 1921 ===
He was selected as a third-team All-American by Walter Camp in 1921.

=== 1922 ===
Whelchel was unanimously elected captain of the 1922 team. Camp gave him honorable mention.
