= Joe Bennett (American football) =

American football and basketball player (1901–1975)

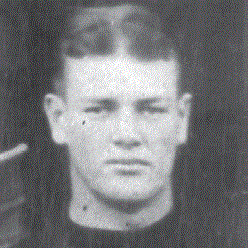

No. 11 – Georgia Bulldogs
- Position: Tackle
- Class: 1923

Personal information
- Born: April 9, 1901; Statesboro, Georgia, U.S.
- Died: October 23, 1975 (aged 74); Alameda, California, U.S.
- Listed weight: 180 lb (82 kg)

Career information
- College: Georgia (1920–1923)

Awards and highlights
- SIAA championship (1920, 1921); All-Southern (1922, 1923); All-American (1922); All-Time Georgia All-Star Team (1935); Georgia Sports Hall of Fame; Georgia Bulldogs Hall of Heroes

Joseph Johnston Bennett Jr. (April 9, 1901 – October 23, 1975) was an American football and basketball player for the Georgia Bulldogs of the University of Georgia. Bennett was captain of the 1923 team, and considered one of the best kick-blockers in the south. "Prior to the 1960s, Bennett is likely Georgia's most outstanding tackle." After university, he became an executive with Coca-Cola in Atlanta and Los Angeles. Bennett was inducted into the State of Georgia Sports Hall of Fame in 1984.

== Biography ==
=== Early life ===
Joseph Johnston Bennett, Jr. was born on April 1, 1901, in Statesboro, Georgia, to Joseph Sr., a Baptist minister, and Mary Conyers.

=== University of Georgia ===
Bennett was a prominent tackle for coaches Herman Stegeman and Kid Woodruff's Georgia Bulldogs football team from 1920 to 1923, starting as a freshman. During his playing years Georgia's football team compiled a record of 25–9–4. The team shared Southern Intercollegiate Athletic Association (SIAA) titles in 1920 and 1921. Bennett received Walter Camp All-America honorable mention in 1922. An All-Time Georgia All-Star Team published in 1935 had Bennett as a first-team tackle.

=== Death ===
Bennett died on October 23, 1975, in Alameda, California, at the age of 74.

== See also ==
- 1922 College Football All-America Team
- 1923 College Football All-Southern Team
