= Ike Joselove =

American football player (1904–1925)

Profile
- Position: Guard

Personal information
- Born: September 30, 1904; Georgia, U.S.
- Died: June 6, 1925 (aged 20); Atlanta, Georgia, U.S.

Career information
- High school: Technical
- College: Georgia (1922–1924)

Awards and highlights
- All-Southern (1924)

Isadore Aaron "Ike" Joselove (September 30, 1904 – June 6, 1925) was a college football player. He was killed in an automobile accident. He attended Tech High School in Atlanta.

== University of Georgia ==
Joselove was a prominent guard for the Georgia Bulldogs football team of the University of Georgia.

=== 1924 ===
In 1924, he was selected All-Southern by the players of Vanderbilt University.
