= Dick Hartley =

American football player (1900–1978)

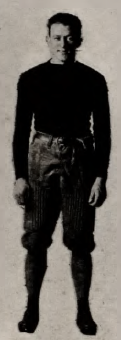
- Hartley, c. 1920

No. 23 – Georgia Bulldogs
- Position: Halfback

Personal information
- Born: December 13, 1900 (Note: Hartley's draft registration card of December 1942 lists his date of birth as December 13, 1901; however, both his obituary and Beneficiary Identification Records Locator Subsystem (BIRLS) death file list his date of birth as December 13, 1900.); Fort Valley, Georgia, U.S.
- Died: August 4, 1978 (aged 77); Petaluma, California, U.S.

Career information
- High school: Georgia Military Academy
- College: Georgia (1920–1921)

Awards and highlights
- SIAA Championship (1920, 1921)

Hugh Vinson "Dick" Hartley (December 13, 1900 – August 4, 1978) was an American college football player and business executive.

== Biography ==
Hartley was born on December 13, 1900, in Fort Valley, Georgia. He prepped at Georgia Military Academy, graduating in 1919. He then starred as a halfback for the Georgia Bulldogs in 1920 and 1921. As a member of the "ten second backfield" (Note: The term "ten second backfield" generally refers to players capable (or thought to be capable) of running a 100-yard dash in 10 seconds—that is, fast runners.) in 1920, Hartley ran for 170 yards and two touchdowns in a minute and twenty seconds against South Carolina. That season, he scored a total of 11 touchdowns, including eight on runs of more than 35 yards. In 1921, he scored on Harvard, and he fumbled twice against Dartmouth. Hartley was also a standout member of Georgia's track team, and was a member of the Delta Tau Delta fraternity.

As of October 1922, Hartley was coaching high school football in Emanuel County, Georgia. In August 1923, Hartley was reportedly set to enter the United States Military Academy at West Point, New York. He joined Thomas Cook & Son in 1924, and was made a director of the company in 1964. During World War II, he was a major in the United States Army Air Forces, serving from September 1942 to January 1946.

Hartley died on August 4, 1978, aged 77, on Petaluma, California.
