= Blood Miller =

American football player and track & field athlete

No. 5
- Position: End

Personal information
- Listed weight: 180 lb (82 kg)

Career information
- College: Sewanee (1922)

Awards and highlights
- All-Southern (1922); Porter Cup (1922)

Virgil George "Blood" Miller was an American college football player and track and field athlete for the Sewanee Tigers of Sewanee: The University of the South. He later went to Tampa. Miller was selected All-Southern in 1922 by Marvin McCarthy, sporting editor of the Birmingham Age-Herald, a year in which he drew praise for his work against Oglethorpe. He won the Porter Cup as Sewanee's best all-around athlete.
