= Edgar David =

American football player

Profile
- Position: End

Career information
- College: Oglethorpe (1920–1923)

Awards and highlights
- All-Southern (1922); Oglethorpe Athletics Hall of Fame

Edgar George David was a college football player.

== Oglethorpe ==
David was a prominent baseball, basketball and football player for the Oglethorpe Stormy Petrels of Oglethorpe University. He was captain of the football team in 1922, a year in which he was selected All-Southern. He was inducted into the Oglethorpe Athletic Hall of Fame in 1969. The Yamacraw, the school's yearbook, remarked his coach said "that no finer leader ever graced a southern gridiron than Ed David."
