= Teany Randall =

American football player (1901–1965)

Profile
- Position: Halfback

Personal information
- Born: May 3, 1901; New Albany, Indiana, U.S.
- Died: September 12, 1965 (aged 64); Piqua, Ohio, U.S.

Career information
- College: Georgia (1921–1924)

Awards and highlights
- SIAA Championship (1921)

Loren Chester "Teany" Randall (May 3, 1901 – September 12, 1965) was a college football player for the Georgia Bulldogs. He played halfback and quarterback on the Southern Intercollegiate Athletic Association champion 1921 team. Against Newberry in 1922, Randall scored 19 points on three touchdowns and one PAT. He once intercepted a pass intended for Mercer's Crook Smith and ran 90 yards for a score.

== Early life ==
Loren Chester "Teany" Randall was born on May 3, 1901, in New Albany, Indiana, to Albert L. Randall, an insurance salesman, and Nettie (Miller) Randall, who both died prior to his 17th birthday. While traveling with a symphony orchestra from Cincinnati after the death of his parents, Teany met a major in Monteagle, Tennessee, who encouraged him to join the football team at Chalmer's Military Academy in Jacksonville, Florida. At the conclusion of his high school career in the spring of 1920, his senior yearbook quote read, "Throw my books in the lake! I'm going to play football!" Randall started his collegiate athletic career at Chalmer's Military that fall.

== University of Georgia ==
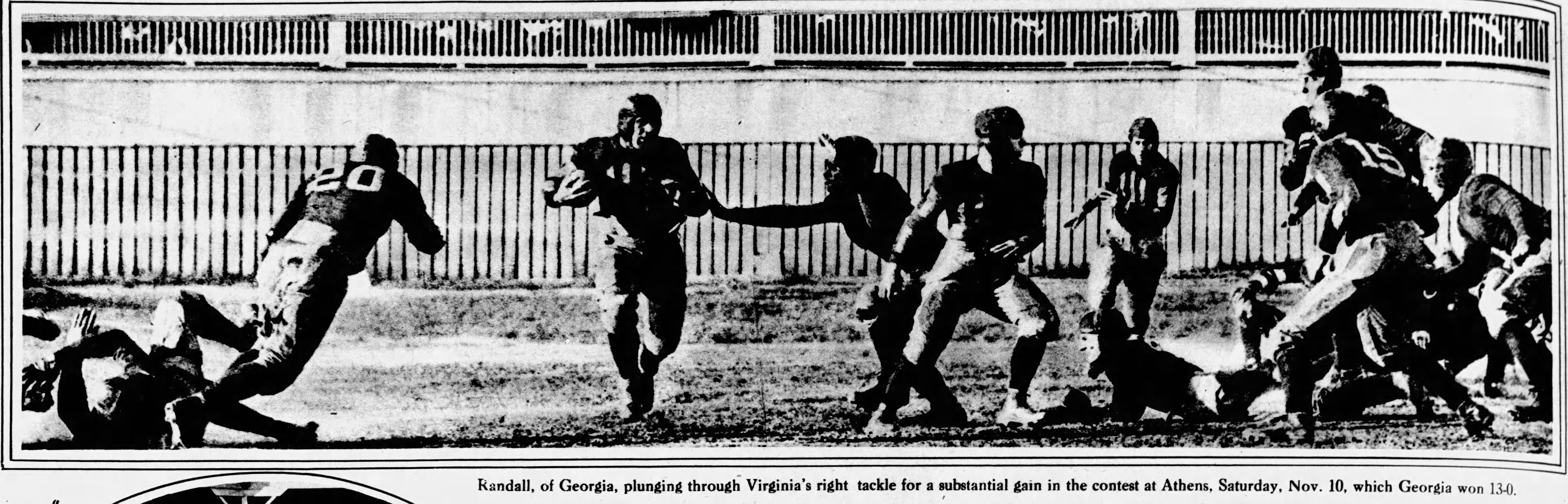
Randall playing in the November 10, 1923 game vs. Virginia

After winning a scholarship, Randall joined the varsity football squad at the University of Georgia the following year in 1921, the last year freshman were allowed to play varsity sports. Injuries plagued the first two years of Randall's career with the Bulldogs, but he maintained his status as a top player until his exit in 1924. Randall was most noted for his versatility as a student athlete, directing the university's orchestra, singing in the choir, writing poems and drawing sketches, and playing on the varsity football, baseball, and track and field teams. He was also tapped to join the inaugural University of Georgia swim team in 1925 while living in Jacksonville, Florida.

== Later life ==
Randall eventually removed to Springfield, Ohio, where he met and married Elizabeth Gram in 1930 while working on a musical revue together. Teany raised his family in Springfield and died in Piqua, Ohio, on September 12, 1965.
