= Thug Murray =

American football player and coach (1898–1979)

Roger Murray
Biographical details
- Born: May 8, 1898; Jackson, Tennessee, U.S.
- Died: August 1979 (aged 81); Jackson, Tennessee, U.S.

Playing career

Football
- 1919–1920: Navy
- 1921–1922: Sewanee
- 1923: Cumberland
- Position: Tackle

Coaching career (HC unless noted)
- 1923: Cumberland (TN)

Accomplishments and honors

Awards
- Walter Camp All-America Honorable Mention (1920); Billy Evans's Southern Honor Roll (1922); Cumberland Athletics Hall of Fame; Tennessee Sports Hall of Fame; Sewanee All-Time Football Team

Roger Goodman "Thug" Murray (May 8, 1898 – August, 1979) was an American college football player and coach.

== Naval Academy ==
Murray played on Navy teams which beat Army twice. The New York Times wrote of Murray's play in the 1920 game, praising Murray for opening holes through which "a wagon could be driven." He was a member of Sigma Alpha Epsilon.

== Sewanee ==
After a short stint with the Merchant Marines, Murray played for the Sewanee Tigers in 1921 and 1922. He wore number 10. Billy Evans selected him All-Southern in 1922, placing him on his "Southern Honor Roll." Walter Camp gave Murray honorable mention on his All-America team. Murray was placed on Sewanee's "All-Time" football team.

== Cumberland ==
He then went on to Cumberland to finish his law degree, as well as perform the function of football player, head football coach, and athletics director. Murray was posthumously inducted into the Cumberland Sports Hall of Fame in 1981, and into the Tennessee Sports Hall of Fame in 1983. He was the first posthumous inductee of the latter.
