= Windy White =

American football fullback

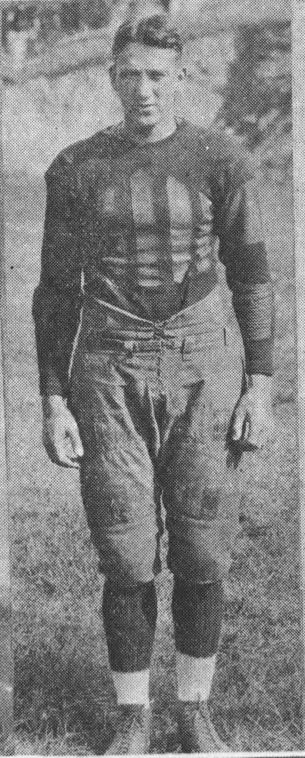
- White in 1925

VMI Keydets
- Position: Fullback

Personal information
- Listed height: 6 ft 2 in (1.88 m)
- Listed weight: 190 lb (86 kg)

Career information
- College: VMI (1922–1925)

Awards and highlights
- All-Southern (1923); VMI Sports Hall of Fame

Wyndham R. "Windy" White Jr. was a college football player. He was a fullback for the VMI Keydets in the 1920s. He was selected All-Southern in 1923. He also played basketball. He is in the VMI Hall of Fame.
