= Rip Reagan =

American football player and coach (1898–1971)

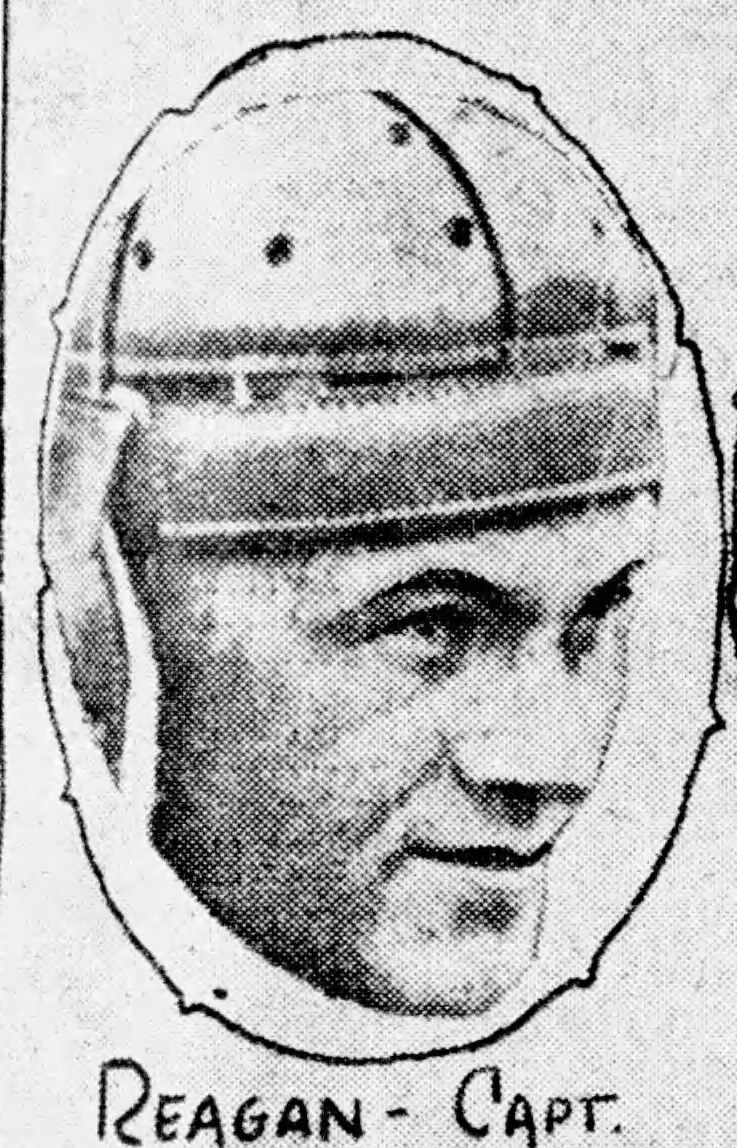

Profile
- Position: Guard

Personal information
- Born: March 20, 1898; Delta, Alabama, U.S.
- Died: February 22, 1971 (aged 72); Gadsden, Alabama, U.S.

Career information
- College: Auburn (1920–1923)

Awards and highlights
- All-Southern (1922, 1923)

Frank Alexander "Rip" Reagan (March 20, 1898 – February 22, 1971) was an American football player and coach.

== Early life ==
Frank A. Reagan was born on March 20, 1898, in Delta, Alabama, to William Eugene Reagan and Ann Judson Jenkins.

== Auburn University ==
He was a prominent guard for the Auburn Tigers of Auburn University, captain of the 1923 team. Reagan was twice selected All-Southern.

== High school coach and educator ==
Reagan was head coach at Gadsden City High School from 1924 to 1927. He also coached at Disque High School. Reagan was once principal of Emma Sansom High School.

== Military ==
Reagan was also prominent in the military.
