= Birkett Pribble =

American football player (1897–1987)

Profile
- Position: Guard

Personal information
- Born: August 25, 1897; Butler, Kentucky
- Died: December 24, 1987 (aged 90); Lake County, Illinois

Career information
- College: Kentucky (1921–1922)

Awards and highlights
- All-Southern (1922)

Birkett Lee Pribble (August 25, 1897 – December 24, 1987) was an American college football player. He was a guard for the Kentucky Wildcats, selected All-Southern in 1922. The 1922 team beat Alabama.
