= Jim Tom Reynolds =

American football player

Profile
- Position: Halfback

Career information
- College: Georgia (1921)

Awards and highlights
- All-Southern (1921)

Jim Tom Reynolds was a college football player. He was a running back for coach Herman Stegeman's Georgia Bulldogs football team. Reynolds was All-Southern in 1921, and scored the touchdown in the tie with Vanderbilt.
