= E. R. Moulton =

American educator, athlete, and coach (1900–1979)

Profile
- Position: End

Personal information
- Born: April 21, 1900; Mobile, Alabama, U.S.
- Died: October 14, 1979 (aged 79); Rome, Georgia, U.S.

Career information
- College: Auburn (1921–1923)

Awards and highlights
- All-Southern (1922)

Edward Russell "Slick" Moulton (April 21, 1900 – October 14, 1979) was an American educator and a college football and baseball player and coach.

== Auburn ==
"Slick" attended Auburn University, where he played for the football and baseball teams. On the football team, Slick was an All-Southern end for Mike Donahue, and was selected by coach Donahue for his All-time Auburn team. Walter Camp gave Moulton honorable mention on his All-America team in 1922. After graduation Moulton stayed coaching baseball and was an assistant football coach at Auburn High School. In 1927, he returned to Auburn as an assistant football and head baseball coach.

== Educator ==
Moulton was instrumental in the founding and organization of the Georgia Education Association, where he served as president.

=== Lindale ===
Moulton was brought to Lindale in 1929, where he was superintendent of schools and manager of the Lindale baseball team for 37 years.
