= J. D. Lawrence =

American football player (1903–1971)

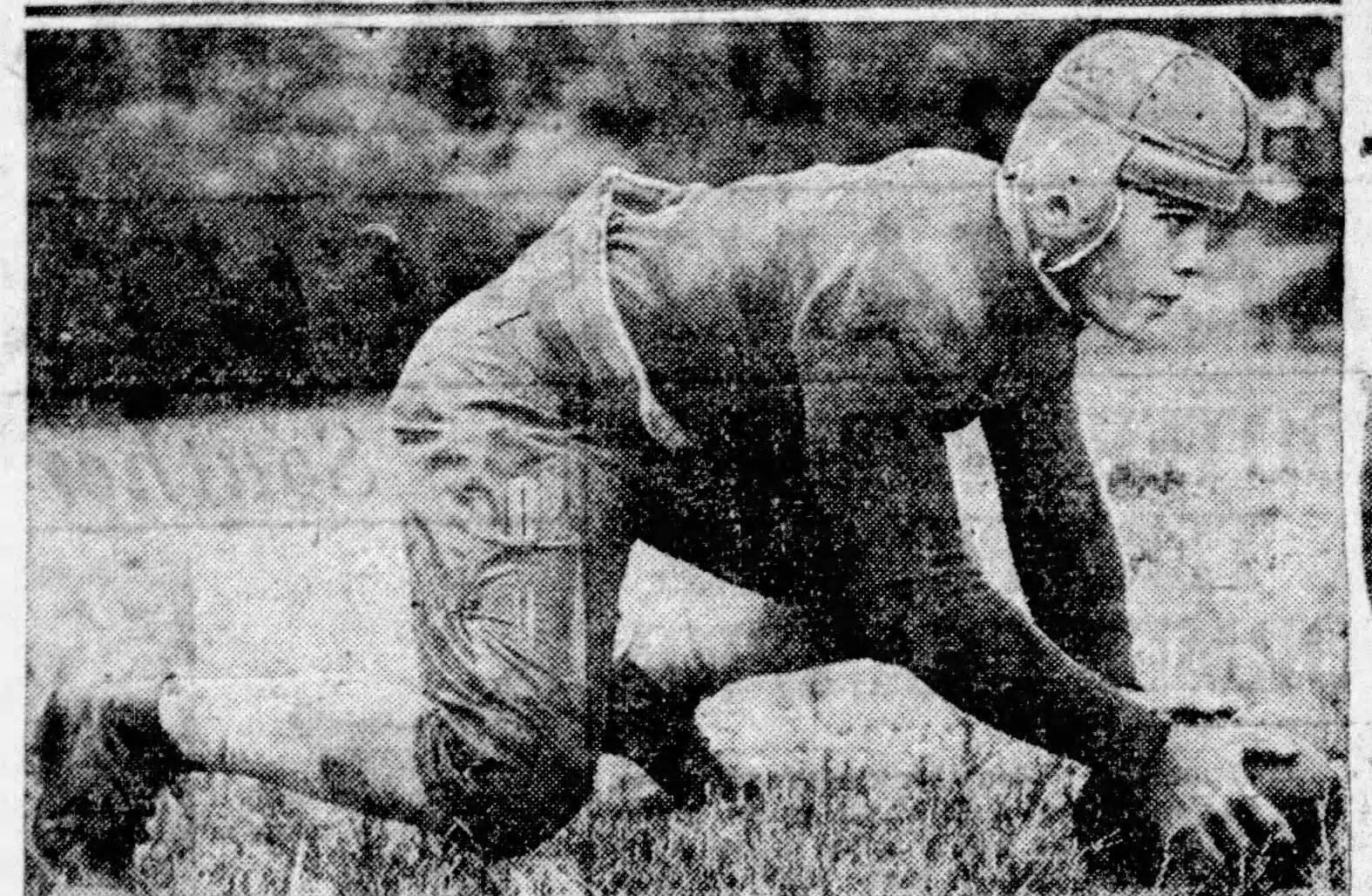
- Lawrence in 1924

Profile
- Position: Center

Personal information
- Born: January 21, 1903; Plantersville, Alabama, U.S.
- Died: March 8, 1971 (aged 68); Birmingham, Alabama, U.S.

Career information
- College: Auburn (1922–1924)

Awards and highlights
- All-Southern (1923, 1924)

James Driskell "Fats" Lawrence (January 21, 1903 – March 8, 1971) was an All-Southern college football center for the Auburn Tigers of Auburn University. Lawrence was captain in his senior year of 1924. Upon graduation the Glomerata, the school's yearbook, writes "Fats was a real leader, a hard worker, a quick thinker, and a clean player; in other words, an ideal football man, and Auburn will have a hard time finding a center to fill his shoes."

== Early life ==
James Driskell Lawrence was born on January 21, 1903, in Plantersville, Alabama to Charles Lawrence and Salliego Driskell Todd.
