= Adrian Maurer =

American football player (1901–1943)

Profile
- Position: Running back

Personal information
- Born: April 7, 1901; Canton, Ohio
- Died: May 4, 1943 (aged 42); San Francisco, California
- Listed height: 5 ft 8 in (1.73 m)
- Listed weight: 185 lb (84 kg)

Career information
- College: Oglethorpe

Career history
- Oglethorpe Stormy Petrels (1923–1925); Newark Bears (1926)

Awards and highlights
- Championships: 2 SIAA (1924, 1925); Honors: All-SIAA (1923); second-team All-Southern (1923, 1925); Oglethorpe University Athletic Hall of Fame

Adrian Harold "Sparky" Maurer (April 7, 1901 – May 4, 1943) was an American football player.

== Oglethorpe University ==
He played college football as a running back for the Oglethorpe Stormy Petrels football team of Oglethorpe University. He was inducted into the Oglethorpe University Athletic Hall of Fame in 1962.

=== 1923 ===
Maurer was selected second-team All-Southern by Julian Leggett of the Macon News, and first team All-Southern Intercollegiate Athletic Association (SIAA) by various writers including Morgan Blake.

=== 1924 ===
He was captain of the 1924 team which won the SIAA championship.

=== 1925 ===
The 1925 team was again SIAA champion.

== Newark Bears ==
He played professionally with the Newark Bears. The Bears are remembered for the team's financially weak ownership group, which led to the folding of the team mid-season. The team played only five games before folding in October.
