= Tarzan Holt =

American football player and coach

Profile
- Position: End

Career information
- College: Tennessee (1920–1923)

Awards and highlights
- All-Southern (1922)

Robert "Tarzan" Holt was an American college football player and high school football coach. He once coached high school football at Tellico Plains, Tennessee. He also coached under Bill Brennan at Little Rock College.

== University of Tennessee ==
Holt was a prominent end for the Tennessee Volunteers football team of the University of Tennessee from 1920 to 1923. Coach M. B. Banks moved him to the position from the backfield.

=== 1922 ===
He was selected All-Southern in 1922.

=== 1923 ===
Holt was elected captain of 1923.
