= Brother Brown (American football) =

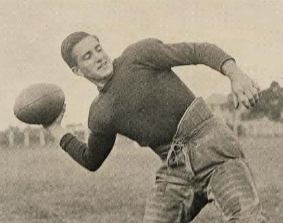

No. 1 – Tulane Green Wave
- Position: Halfback

Career information
- College: Tulane (1921–1924)

Awards and highlights
- All-Southern (1924); Tulane Athletics Hall of Fame

Alfred W. "Brother" Brown was a college football player.

== Tulane University ==
He was a prominent running back for the Tulane Green Wave football team of Tulane University from 1921 to 1924. Clark Shaughnessy said he was the best player he ever coached. He, Peggy Flournoy and hall of famer Lester Lautenschlaeger were all in the backfield. Brown was inducted into the Tulane Athletics Hall of Fame in 1979. LSU coach Irving Pray told his players of Brown, "Don't try to tackle him on sweeps. Just run with him and force him out of bounds."

The last TD in the 21–0 win over LSU came on a 65-yard punt return by Brown. Brown was captain in 1924. Tulane suffered only one loss all year – to Mississippi A&M. He closed the season with several 100 yard rushing efforts. Brown was selected All-Southern by the players of the Vanderbilt Commodores.

== Professional football ==
Brown and Lautenschlaeger played once against Red Grange's Chicago Bears in the first professional football game in New Orleans.
