= Dick Mulvehill =

American football quarterback

Profile
- Position: Quarterback

Career information
- College: Georgia (1922)

Awards and highlights
- Billy Evans Southern Holl (1922)

Richard Mulvehill was a college football player. Mulvehill was a quarterback for the Georgia Bulldogs, selected for Billy Evans's Southern Honor Roll in 1922.
