= Charlie Barbour =

American football player (1904–1964)

- Barbour in football uniform c. 1923

Profile
- Position: Tackle

Personal information
- Born: November 13, 1904; Martinsville, Virginia, U.S.
- Died: December 27, 1964 (aged 60)
- Listed height: 6 ft 3 in (1.91 m)
- Listed weight: 235 lb (107 kg)

Career information
- High school: Martinsville
- College: Virginia Military Institute

Career history
- VMI Keydets (1923); Buffalo Bisons (1925)

Awards and highlights
- All-Southern (1923)

Charles Smith Barbour (November 13, 1904 – December 27, 1964) was an American football tackle in the National Football League (NFL). Born in Martinsville, Virginia, Barbour played college football for the VMI Keydets, selected All-Southern in 1923. The 1923 team went 9–1. Only an upset by William Alexander's Georgia Tech stopped an undefeated season. He also wrestled at VMI. He played for the Buffalo Bisons in 1925.
