= Jim Taylor (tackle) =

American football player

Profile
- Position: Tackle

Personal information
- Born: Hazlehurst, Georgia, U.S.

Career information
- College: Georgia (1920–1924)

Awards and highlights
- All-Southern (1924); Third-team All-American (1924)

N. James Taylor was an American college football player.

== College football ==
Taylor was a prominent tackle for the Georgia Bulldogs football team of the University of Georgia. When John Fletcher went down with injury, Taylor was acting captain of the 1924 team. He was selected All-Southern the same year, as well as a third-team All-American by Norman E. Brown.
