= John Shirey =

American football player and engineer (1898–1966)

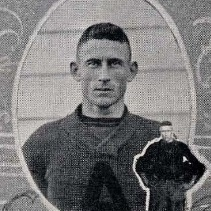
- Shirey in the Glomerata c. 1919

Profile
- Positions: Halfback, end

Personal information
- Born: March 19, 1898; Texas, U.S.
- Died: October 19, 1966 (aged 68); Phenix City, Alabama, U.S.

Career information
- College: Auburn (1920–1922)

Awards and highlights
- All-Southern (1922)

John Brett Shirey (March 19, 1898 – October 19, 1966) was an American college football player and engineer, He was a member of the American Society of Mechanical Engineers.

== Early life ==
Shirey was born on March 19, 1898, in Texas to John Meredith Shirey and Loretta Hughes, and grew up in Guin, Alabama.

== Auburn ==
Shirey was a prominent running back for the Auburn Tigers of Auburn University. Shirey played for coach Mike Donahue from 1918 to 1922. He was a member of an All-time Auburn Tigers football team selected in 1935, as well as coach Donahue's all-time Auburn team.

=== 1922 ===
He was captain-elect in 1922, The Glomerata, Auburn's yearbook, says Shirey's "greatest delight is to catch a forward pass and serenade down the field like lightning. Walter Camp gave Shirey honorable mention on his All-America team.
