= Ben Compton (American football) =

American football player

Profile
- Position: Guard

Personal information
- Born: April 2, 1901; Greensboro, Alabama
- Died: October 18, 1946 (aged 45); Tuskegee, Alabama

Career information
- College: Alabama (1922–1924)

Awards and highlights
- SoCon championship (1924); All-Southern (1922, 1924)

Ben E. Compton (April 2, 1901 – October 18, 1946) was a college football player.

== University of Alabama ==
He was a prominent guard for the Alabama Crimson Tide football team of the University of Alabama from 1922 to 1924, playing opposite Bill Buckler. Compton also kicked.

=== 1924 ===
Compton was a member of the 1924 Southern Conference champion, playing opposite Bill Buckler. He was selected All-Southern on the second of two composite All-Southern selections.
