= Oglethorpe Stormy Petrels football =

American college football team

- First season: 1917
- Last season: 1941; 84 years ago
- Stadium: Hermance Stadium (capacity: 5,000)
- Location: Brookhaven, Georgia
- Conference titles: 2
- Colors: Black and gold

The Oglethorpe Stormy Petrels football team represented Oglethorpe University in college football. They have not competed since 1941 when World War II shut down all sports in 1942.

== History ==
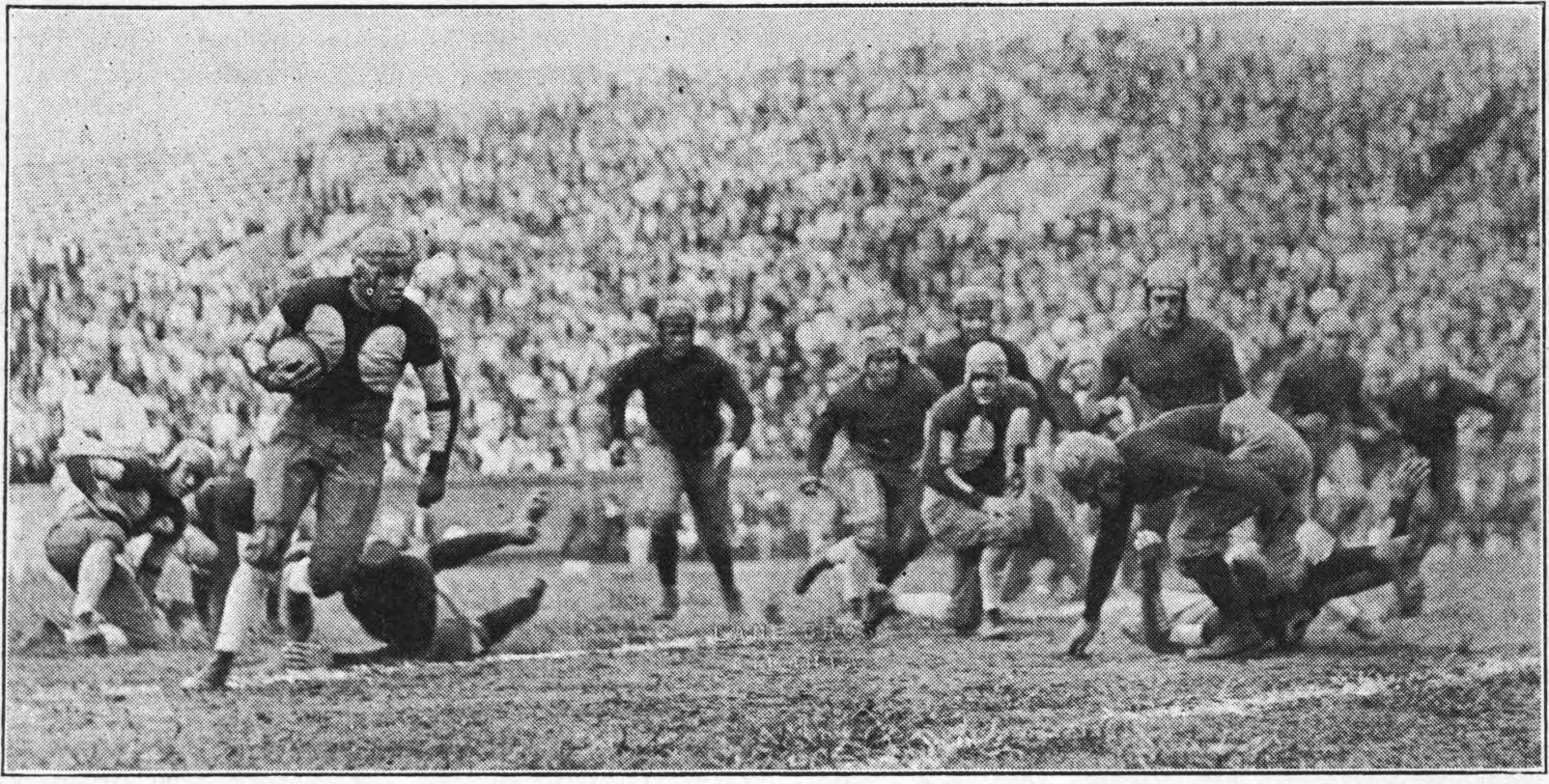
The 1925 team playing Georgia Tech at Grant Field

Frank B. Anderson established the football and baseball programs in 1917. Jogger Elcock was the team's next coach. Under Harry J. Robertson, the team won a Southern Intercollegiate Athletic Association (SIAA) conference title on the back of Adrian Maurer in 1924 and 1925.

The 1926 team defeated Georgia Tech, and the 1929 team beat Georgia.

== Notable players ==
- Edgar David
- Adrian Maurer
- Charlie Waller
- Luke Appling
