= Clyde Propst =

American football player and coach (1898–1959)

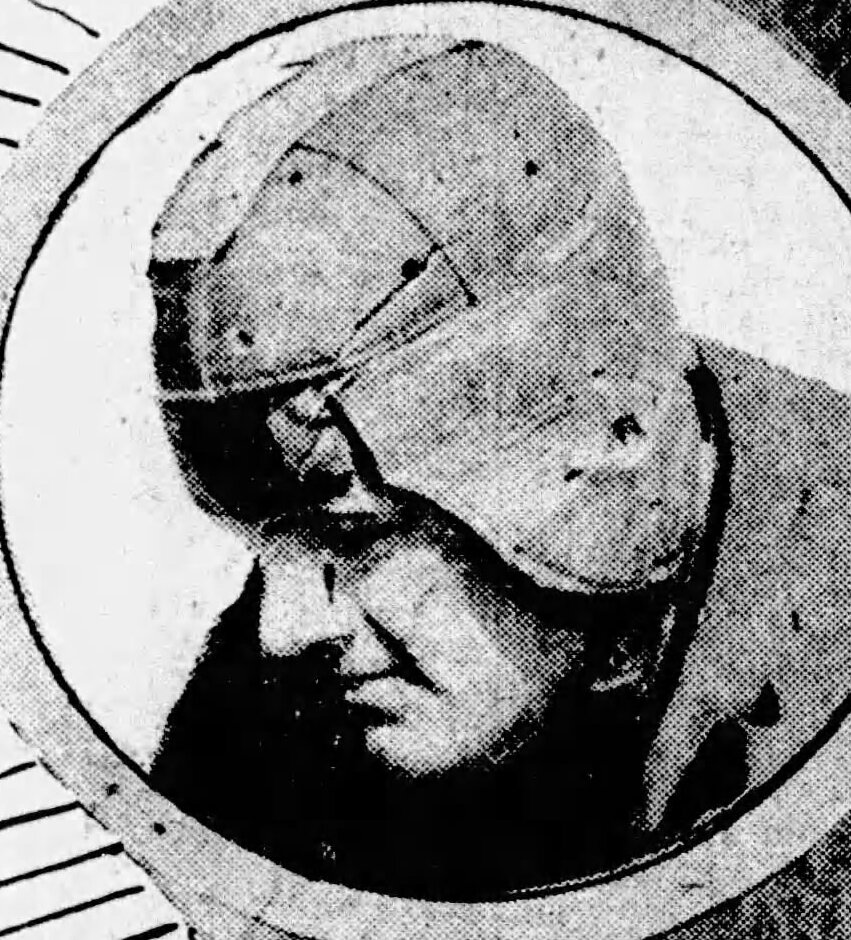
- Propst photo from the Atlanta Journal's composite All-Southern college football team, 1923.

Biographical details
- Born: May 12, 1898; Ohatchee, Alabama, U.S.
- Died: October 13, 1959 (aged 61); Philadelphia, Pennsylvania, U.S.

Playing career
- ?: Birmingham–Southern
- 1922–1924: Alabama
- Position: Center

Coaching career (HC unless noted)
- 1925–1932: Alabama (assistant)
- 1926–1927: Alabama (freshmen)
- 1928–1932: Alabama (assistant)
- 1934: Howard (AL)
- 1935–1937: Southwestern (TN)
- 1944–1947: Auburn (line)

Administrative career (AD unless noted)
- 1935–1937: Southwestern (TN)

Head coaching record
- Overall: 19–14–6

Accomplishments and honors

Championships
- 1 SoCon (1924)

Awards
- 3× All-Southern (1922, 1923, 1924)

Ralph Clyde "Shorty" Propst (May 12, 1898 – October 13, 1959) was an American college football player and coach. He served as head coach at both Howard and Southwestern from 1934 to 1937. During his tenure as a head coach, Propst had an overall record of 19 wins, 14 losses and 6 ties (19–14–6).

== Playing career ==
Propst was a prominent center for the Alabama Crimson Tide football teams of the University of Alabama coached by Xen C. Scott and Wallace Wade. In three different years he was selected All-Southern. He recovered Pooley Hubert's fumble in the endzone which was the deciding score in the 9 to 7 victory over Penn in 1922, arguably the biggest win in the era of Scott's coaching tenure. He won the Porter Loving Cup three times. He also played center on Alabama's basketball team.

== Coaching career ==
After he graduated from Alabama, Propst began his coaching career under Wallace Wade with the Crimson Tide in 1925. At Alabama, Propst served as an assistant with the varsity in 1925, led the freshmen team in 1926 and 1927 before returning as a varsity assistant from 1928 to 1932. After the 1932 season, he left coaching briefly to enter private business. On March 21, 1934, Propst was hired to serve as head coach at Howard College (now Samford University) after Eddie McLane resigned to take the same position at Louisiana Tech. During his one season with the Bulldogs, Propst led Howard to an overall record of three wins, four losses and two ties (3–4–2).

He resigned his position at Howard one year later on March 7, 1935 to become both the head coach and athletic director at Southwestern College of Memphis (now Rhodes College). The position came available after the death of James DeHart who was hired, but never coached a game at Southwestern in February 1935. During his three-year tenure with the Lynx, his most notable victory came in 1936 when he led Southwestern to a 12–0 upset over Vanderbilt. Propst later resigned both as head coach and athletic director at Southwestern on December 3, 1937. He chose to resign after he learned his contract was not to be renewed in March 1938 by university officials. During his three-year tenure at Southwestern, Propst led the Lynx to an overall record of sixteen wins, ten losses and four ties (16–10–4). Propst later served as line coach at Auburn University from 1944 to 1947.

== Head coaching record ==
Year	Team	Overall	Conference	Standing	Bowl/playoffs
Howard Bulldogs (Dixie Conference / Southern Intercollegiate Athletic Association) (1934)
1934	Howard	3–4–2	0–1 / 2–1–1	7th / T–11th	
Howard:		3–4–2	2–2–1		
Southwestern Lynx (Dixie Conference) (1935–1937)
1935	Southwestern	3–4–3	2–2–2	T–4th	
1936	Southwestern	7–2–1	3–1–1	T–2nd	
1937	Southwestern	6–4	4–1	T–2nd	
Southwestern:		16–10–4	9–4–3		
Total:		19–14–6			

== Later life ==
After he resigned from Auburn, Propst was recommended by Sam Hobbs in 1948 to serve as postmaster in Ohatchee, Alabama. He later died on October 13, 1959, at the home of his daughter in Philadelphia where he had resided since 1957.
