= Billy Evans =

American baseball umpire (1884–1956)

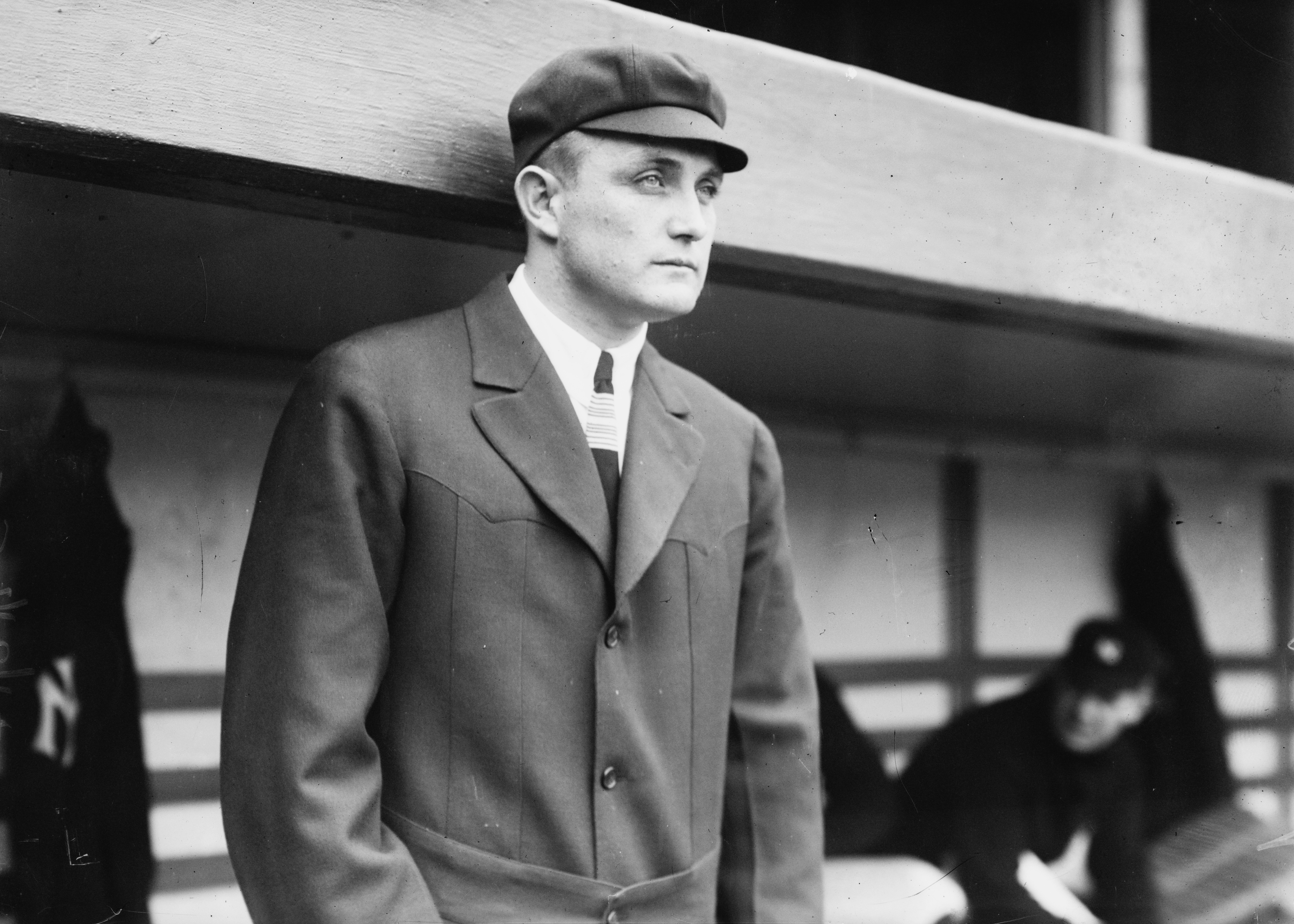
- Evans in 1914
- Born: February 10, 1884; Chicago, Illinois, U.S.
- Died: January 23, 1956 (aged 71); Miami, Florida, U.S.
- Occupation: Baseball umpire
- Years active: 1906–1927
- Spouse: Hazel Baldwin (m. 1908)
- Children: Robert
- Baseball career

Member of the National

Baseball Hall of Fame
- Induction: 1973
- Election method: Veterans Committee

William George Evans (February 10, 1884 – January 23, 1956), nicknamed "the Boy Umpire", was an American umpire in Major League Baseball (MLB) who worked in the American League from 1906 to 1927. He became, at age 22, the youngest umpire in major league history, and later became the youngest to officiate in the World Series at age 25.

Upon his retirement at age 43, his 3,319 career games ranked fifth in major league history; his 1,757 games as a home plate umpire ranked third in AL history, and remain the eighth-most by a major league umpire. He later became a key front office executive for the Cleveland Indians and Detroit Tigers of MLB, the Cleveland Rams of the National Football League, and president of the minor league Southern Association.

In addition to his inside role in the sport, Evans authored countless articles, as well as two books, Umpiring from the Inside (1947) and Knotty Problems in Baseball (1950). He was elected to the Baseball Hall of Fame in 1973, the third umpire ever selected.

== Formative years ==
Evans was born in Chicago. When he was still a child, he relocated with his family to Youngstown, Ohio, where his Welsh-born father became superintendent at a Carnegie steel plant. In Youngstown, the Evans family joined Westminster Presbyterian Church, where Billy Evans attended Sunday school. As a youth, Evans was active in YMCA programs and participated in a neighborhood baseball club called the Youngstown Spiders, a team named in honor of the regionally popular Cleveland Spiders. He gained notability as an athlete at Youngstown's Rayen School, excelling at baseball, football, and track. In 1902, Evans enrolled at Cornell University, where he played on a freshman team managed by veteran major league shortstop Hughie Jennings. After two years, his law studies and collegiate sports career came to an end, with the sudden death of his father. Evans returned to Ohio and accepted a job as a sports reporter at the Youngstown Daily Vindicator. The paper's city editor, Sam Wright, hired Evans on the basis of writing experience he secured as a staff member of his high school yearbook and college newspaper. At the same time, Wright understood that Evans' varied experiences as an athlete provided him with an in-depth knowledge of sports.

In the early 1900s, while covering a baseball game between the Youngstown Ohio Works club and a team from Homestead, Pennsylvania, Evans was approached by the manager of the local club, ex-major leaguer Marty Hogan, and asked to fill an umpire vacancy. According to Evans's obituary, the aspiring reporter, who was on a date with a young woman, "wasn't interested until Hogan mentioned he would be paid $15 a week for officiating the game", a figure equivalent to a week's salary at his sportswriting job.

Evans' ability caught the attention of Charlie Morton, president of the Ohio–Pennsylvania League, and he was offered a full-time position as a league umpire. Evans accepted the job, on the condition that he could retain his position as a sportswriter. In 1906, he received a spectacular career boost from fellow Youngstowner Jimmy McAleer, an ex-major leaguer who was so impressed with the young man's ability that he recommended Evans to American League president Ban Johnson. This gesture enabled Evans to move from a Class C Division minor league club to the major leagues.

== Major league umpiring career ==
At 22 years of age, Evans was the youngest umpire in major league history; furthermore, he was among those very rare umpires who broke into the major leagues with little previous professional experience. He was regarded as the only umpire of his era who never had played professional baseball himself. After making his debut at Highlanders' Park in New York City, he went on to umpire for six World Series: 1909, 1912, 1915, 1917, 1919 and 1923. Working in an era during which most major league games used no more than two umpires (and sometimes only one), Evans single-handedly umpired seven double-headers in eight days during the 1907 season. He was the base umpire for Charlie Robertson's perfect game on April 30, 1922.

Unlike many umpires, Evans never made claims to infallibility. "I missed a lot of decisions", he once said. "At the time of making such a decision there was no doubt in my mind as to its correctness. However, a second or two later I felt that I erred and wished I could change my original ruling". Evans' humility and impartiality did not always protect him from abusive fans. As sportswriters Daniel Okrent and Steve Wulf observed, "roughness on the field seemed to elicit the same in the stands". On September 15, 1907, in the midst of a doubleheader between the St. Louis Browns and Detroit Tigers, Evans suffered a skull fracture when a bottle hurled by an angry spectator knocked him unconscious. The New York Times described the incident as "one of the most disgraceful scenes ever witnessed on a ball field".

Evans became known as an innovator during more than two decades with the American League. One obituary observed that he "introduced something new to officiating by running down to a base where a play was made so that he would be on top of it". This approach became a standard practice among major league officials. He was also aware of the increasing demands placed on umpires and strongly advocated formal training for baseball officials. Furthermore, in a game that retained much of the rough-and-tumble atmosphere of earlier decades, Evans "substituted diplomacy for belligerency and proved an arbiter could control a game without threats of physical violence".

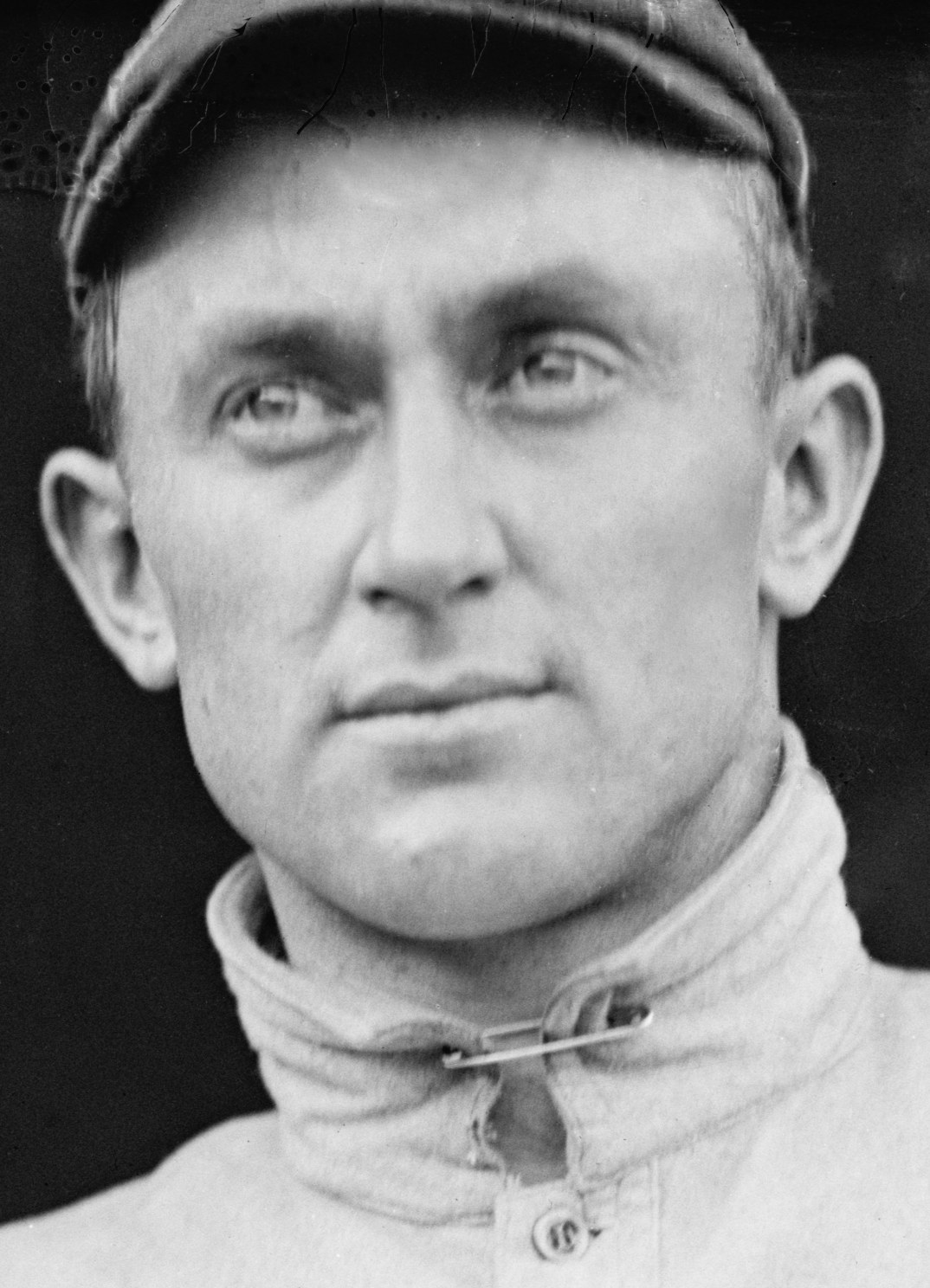
Ty Cobb

At the same time, he was unwilling to "back down" when physically threatened. In September 1921, Evans was involved in a bloody fistfight with Ty Cobb, who contested one of Evans' calls. Baseball historian David Anderson noted that the trouble began when Cobb threatened to "whip" Evans "right at home plate", a move that would have led to Cobb's immediate suspension. Evans supposedly invited Cobb to the umpire's dressing room for "post-game festivities", and before long, the two men were brawling beneath the stands as players from both teams looked on. According to some accounts, many of Cobb's Detroit Tigers teammates "rooted" for Evans. After the fight, Cobb was suspended for one game, while Evans attended the next several games wearing bandages. Both men had agreed before the fight that they would not report it to league officials, but a word of the incident eventually reached the league president, Ban Johnson. According to sports writers Okrent and Wulf, Johnson responded to news of the incident "with uncharacteristic humor", saying "only that he was sorry that he missed it".

For the duration of his career as an umpire, Evans also remained active as a sportswriter. From 1918 to 1928, he served as sports editor of Newspaper Enterprise Association and produced a syndicated sports column titled, "Billy Evans Says". His staff featured well-known sportswriters Jimmy Powers and Joe Williams.

== Executive career ==
Evans retired from umpiring following the 1927 season to become the general manager of the Cleveland Indians, earning a substantial annual salary of $30,000. Baseball historian Bill James observed that Evans was the first front-office executive of a major league team to be officially called a "general manager". In this capacity, Evans was credited with taking the Indians from a second division to a first division team. He served as general manager for the next eight years, until budget cuts forced him out in 1935. Rumors circulated that Evans's decision to leave the Indians was also motivated by a disagreement with the Indians' manager, Walter Johnson, over the suspension of third baseman Willie Kamm and the release of catcher Glenn Myatt. Johnson allegedly accused Evans of "disloyalty", while Evans reportedly replied that he refused to be a "yes man". Evans soon found work as chief scout and head of the Boston Red Sox farm system, but left on October 8, 1940, after the team sold Pee Wee Reese to the Brooklyn Dodgers over his objections.

Shifting sports, Evans returned to Cleveland to become general manager of the Cleveland Rams for the 1941 season. Although the team struggled on the field, it was a financial success, but after failing to come to terms on a new contract, Evans left and spent the next year writing before accepting the position of league president of the Southern Association on December 3, 1942.

During his four years leading the league, the Association thrived despite many other leagues shutting down due to World War II. In his first year, attendance increased by nearly 300,000, and while it dipped slightly in 1944, the threshold of one million people attending league games was again reached the following year.

On December 16, 1946, Evans accepted a contract offer from the Detroit Tigers to become their general manager. One of his first moves was dramatic – selling ageing superstar Hank Greenberg to the Pittsburgh Pirates. Over the next four years, the team had two runner-up finishes to the New York Yankees, but after dropping in the standings during the 1951 season, Evans announced his resignation on July 28 in favor of Tiger legend Charlie Gehringer.

== Private life ==
Despite long absences from his residence in Cleveland, Evans was known as a devoted husband and father. He married the former Hazel Baldwin in 1908; the couple had one child, Robert, who became the sports director of a radio station in Miami, Florida. Evans maintained close ties with family members and died while visiting his son in Miami.

Despite his success, Evans remained accessible to friends from his early days in Youngstown. Shortly after Evans' death, a former high school classmate, E. Allan Lightner, recalled that his late friend "was still the fine clean character that he was in his high school days in Youngstown". Lightner recalled that, shortly after his final conversation with the retired umpire, Evans sent Lightner an autographed photo of himself with former Detroit Tigers manager Red Rolfe.

== Final years ==
By 1952, Evans had unofficially retired, then was injured in an automobile accident in Monroe, Michigan. After recovering, he remained in good health until January 21, 1956, when he suffered a massive stroke while visiting his son. Evans died two days later at the age of 71. Funeral services were held in Cleveland. Evans' remains were interred at Knollwood Cemetery in Mayfield Heights, Ohio.

== Legacy ==
Evans' contributions to baseball have been widely recognized. In 1946 he was named in the Honor Rolls of Baseball, and in 1973 he became the third umpire elected to the Baseball Hall of Fame. Evans is honored for the high standard of professionalism he set during his career as an official, and he is credited as a tireless advocate of formal training for umpires. Ironically, as David Anderson observed, Evans might have been denied the opportunity to serve as an official in the major leagues "if the present day umpire school system existed during the Dead Ball Era". Anderson noted that Evans' description of the basic qualities required of an effective umpire holds up even today: "Good eyes, plenty of courage – mental and physical – thorough knowledge of the playing rules, more than average portions of fair play, common sense and diplomacy, an entire lack of vindictiveness, plenty of confidence in your ability".

In 1917 Billy Evans "noted American League Umpire" teamed up with the Spalding Athletic Library for the book, "How to umpire".
