= 1921 Yale Bulldogs football team =

American college football season

1921 Yale Bulldogs football
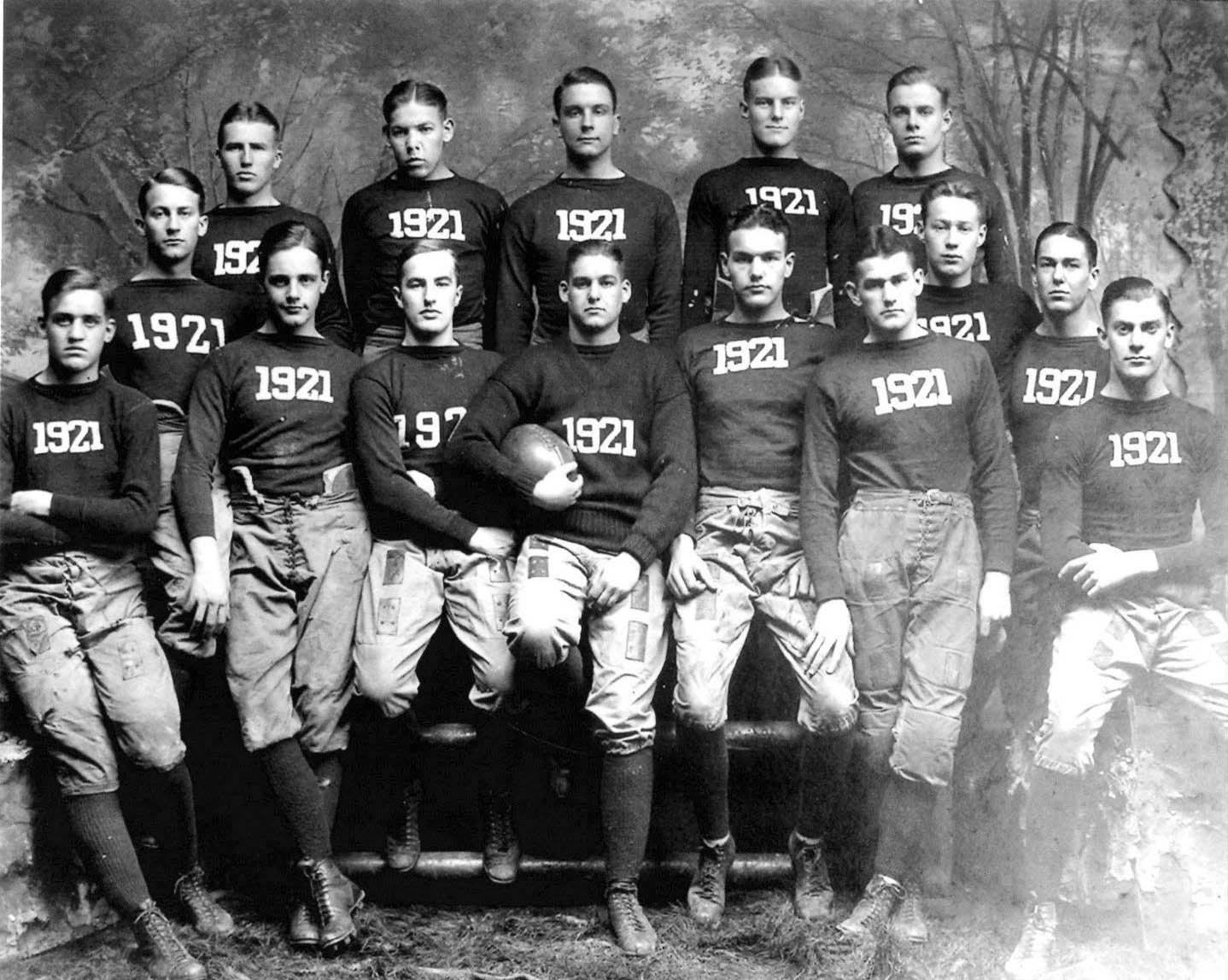
- Conference: Independent
- Record: 8–1
- Head coach: Tad Jones (4th season)
- Offensive scheme: Single-wing
- Captain: Malcolm Aldrich
- Home stadium: Yale Bowl

1921 Eastern college football independents records
	Conf.			Overall
Team	W	L	T	W		L		T
Washington & Jefferson		–		10	–	0	–	1
Lafayette		–		9	–	0	–	0
Cornell		–		8	–	0	–	0
Penn State		–		8	–	0	–	2
Yale		–		8	–	1	–	0
New Hampshire		–		8	–	1	–	1
Franklin & Marshall		–		6	–	1	–	2
Villanova		–		6	–	1	–	2
Carnegie Tech		–		7	–	2	–	0
Syracuse		–		7	–	2	–	0
Harvard		–		7	–	2	–	1
Boston University		–		6	–	2	–	0
Dartmouth		–		6	–	2	–	1
Brown		–		5	–	3	–	1
Bucknell		–		5	–	3	–	1
Geneva		–		5	–	3	–	1
Pittsburgh		–		5	–	3	–	1
Holy Cross		–		5	–	3	–	0
Army		–		6	–	4	–	0
Princeton		–		4	–	3	–	0
Boston College		–		4	–	3	–	1
Fordham		–		4	–	3	–	2
Penn		–		4	–	3	–	2
Colgate		–		4	–	4	–	2
Lehigh		–		4	–	4	–	0
Springfield		–		4	–	5	–	2
Vermont		–		3	–	4	–	0
NYU		–		2	–	3	–	3
Buffalo		–		2	–	3	–	2
Drexel		–		2	–	3	–	1
Rutgers		–		4	–	6	–	0
Rhode Island State		–		3	–	5	–	0
Columbia		–		2	–	6	–	0
Tufts		–		1	–	5	–	2
Duquesne		–		0	–	4	–	1

The 1921 Yale Bulldogs football team represented Yale University in the 1921 college football season. The Bulldogs finished with an 8–1 record under fourth-year head coach Tad Jones. Yale outscored its opponents by a combined score of 202 to 31. Its sole loss came in the final game of the season, a 10–3 loss against Harvard at Cambridge, Massachusetts. Yale halfback Malcolm Aldrich was a consensus selection for the 1921 College Football All-America Team, receiving first-team honors from Walter Camp, Billy Evans, Walter Eckersall, Jack Veiock, Malcolm McLean, and Norman E. Brown.

== Schedule ==
Date	Opponent	Site	Result	Attendance	Source
September 24	Bates	Yale Bowl; New Haven, CT	W 28–0		
October 1	Vermont	Yale Bowl; New Haven, CT	W 14–0		
October 8	North Carolina	Yale Bowl; New Haven, CT	W 34–0		
October 15	Williams	Yale Bowl; New Haven, CT	W 23–0		
October 22	Army	Yale Bowl; New Haven, CT	W 14–7		
October 29	Brown	Yale Bowl; New Haven, CT	W 45–7	20,000	
November 5	Maryland	Yale Bowl; New Haven, CT	W 28–0		
November 12	Princeton	Yale Bowl; New Haven, CT (rivalry)	W 13–7		
November 19	at Harvard	Harvard Stadium; Boston, MA (rivalry)	L 3–10		
