= 1921 college football season =

American college football season

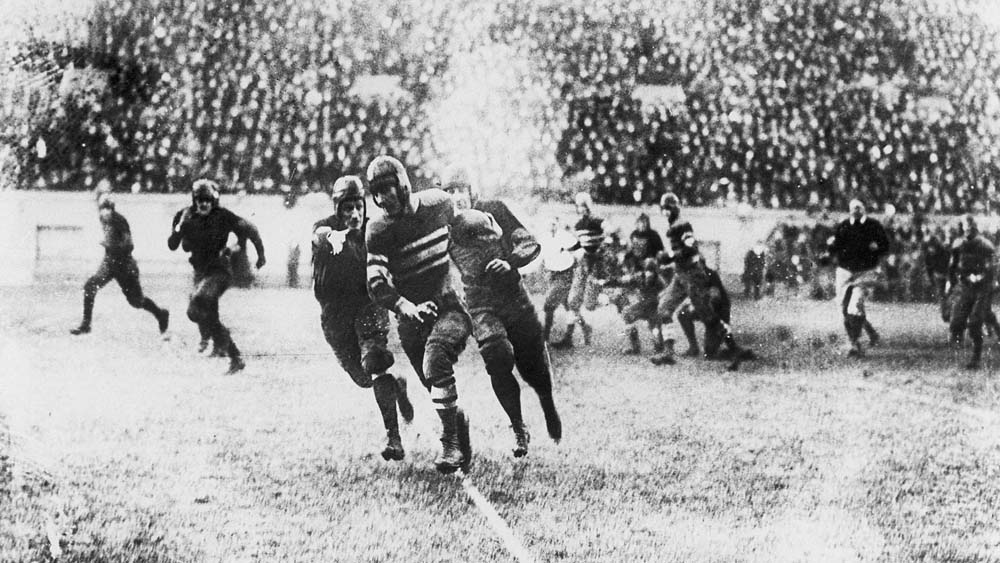
- Bo McMillin scoring against Harvard
- Number of bowls: 3
- Bowl games: December 26, 1921 – January 2, 1922
- Champion(s): California; Cornell; Iowa; Lafayette; Washington & Jefferson

The 1921 college football season had no clear-cut champion, with the Official NCAA Division I Football Records Book listing California Golden Bears, Cornell Big Red, Iowa Hawkeyes, Lafayette Leopards, Washington & Jefferson Presidents, and Vanderbilt Commodores as champions. Only California, Cornell, Iowa, and Lafayette claim national championships for the 1921 season.

Andy Smith's Pacific Coast Conference champion "Wonder Team" at California continued on its streak since 1920. Eastern power Cornell was coached by Gil Dobie and led by one of the sport's great backfields with George Pfann, Eddie Kaw, Floyd Ramsey, and Charles E. Cassidy. Jock Sutherland's Lafayette Maroons were led on the line by Frank Schwab.

Big Ten champion Iowa upset Notre Dame 10–7. Grantland Rice noted that the 1921 Notre Dame team "was the first team we know of to build its attack around a forward passing game, rather than use a forward passing game as a mere aid to the running game."

1921 was the last season for the old Southern Intercollegiate Athletic Association. Vanderbilt tied co-champion Georgia on an onside kick. On October 29, Centre upset Harvard 6–0 in what is widely considered one of the greatest upsets in college football history. Overjoyed students painted the "impossible formula" C6H0 (Centre 6, Harvard 0) on everything in sight. Georgia Tech also claimed a conference title.

The 1922 Rose Bowl was fought to a scoreless tie, between California and Washington & Jefferson, in the last Rose Bowl to be played at Tournament Park. Washington & Jefferson is the smallest school to ever play in a Rose Bowl.

== Conference and program changes ==
=== Conference establishments ===
- Two conferences began play in 1921:
  - Midwest Collegiate Athletic Conference – an active NCAA Division III conference
  - Southwestern Athletic Conference – an active NCAA Division I FCS conference

=== Membership changes ===
School	1920 Conference	1921 Conference
Fresno State Bulldogs	Program Established	Independent
Nebraska Cornhuskers	Independent	MVIAA
Oglethorpe Stormy Petrels	Independent	SIAA
Phillips Haymakers	Southwest	Independent
San Diego State Professors	Program Established	Independent

== First radio broadcast ==
A historical highlight of the regular season was the 1921 West Virginia vs. Pittsburgh football game, the first college football game to be broadcast live on radio. Today, college football on radio is common for nearly every game in every division.

== C6H0 ==
On October 29, Centre College beat Harvard 6 to 0 in what is widely considered one of the greatest upsets in college football history. Overjoyed students painted the "impossible formula" C6H0 (Centre 6, Harvard 0) on everything in sight.

== Bowl games ==
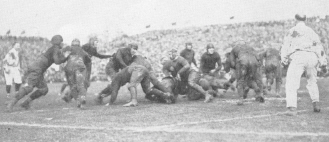
Image from the Rose Bowl.

In the 1922 Rose Bowl, heavily favored California played Washington & Jefferson to a scoreless tie. The game holds several distinctions including being the only scoreless contest and the first tie in a Rose Bowl. Charles Fremont West of Washington & Jefferson was the first African-American quarterback to play in the Rose Bowl, and Herb Kopf, also of Washington and Jefferson, was the first freshman to play in a Rose Bowl. The 1922 Rose Bowl was the last played at Tournament Park. Washington & Jefferson College, with only 450 students at the time, was the smallest school to ever play in a Rose Bowl.

=== Other bowls ===
- 1922 Dixie Classic
- San Diego Christmas Classic

== Conference standings ==
=== Major conference standings ===
1921 Big Ten Conference football standings
	Conf.					Overall
Team	W		L		T	W		L		T
Iowa $	5	–	0	–	0	7	–	0	–	0
Chicago	4	–	1	–	0	6	–	1	–	0
Ohio State	4	–	1	–	0	5	–	2	–	0
Wisconsin	3	–	1	–	1	5	–	1	–	1
Michigan	2	–	1	–	1	5	–	1	–	1
Indiana	1	–	2	–	0	3	–	4	–	0
Minnesota	2	–	4	–	0	3	–	4	–	0
Illinois	1	–	4	–	0	3	–	4	–	0
Purdue	1	–	4	–	0	1	–	6	–	0
Northwestern	0	–	5	–	0	1	–	6	–	0
$ – Conference champion

1921 Missouri Valley Conference football standings
	Conf.					Overall
Team	W		L		T	W		L		T
Nebraska $	3	–	0	–	0	7	–	1	–	0
Kansas State	4	–	2	–	0	5	–	3	–	0
Missouri	4	–	2	–	0	6	–	2	–	0
Drake	2	–	2	–	0	5	–	2	–	0
Kansas	3	–	3	–	0	4	–	4	–	0
Iowa State	3	–	4	–	0	4	–	4	–	0
Oklahoma	2	–	3	–	0	5	–	3	–	0
Washington University	2	–	3	–	0	4	–	3	–	1
Grinnell	0	–	4	–	0	2	–	5	–	0
$ – Conference champion

1921 Northwest Conference football standings
	Conf.					Overall
Team	W		L		T	W		L		T
Whitman $	3	–	0	–	0	4	–	2	–	0
Washington State	2	–	0	–	1	4	–	2	–	1
Oregon	1	–	0	–	3	5	–	1	–	3
Oregon Agricultural	1	–	1	–	1	4	–	3	–	2
Idaho	1	–	2	–	1	4	–	3	–	1
Montana	0	–	2	–	0	3	–	3	–	1
Willamette	0	–	3	–	0	1	–	5	–	0
$ – Conference champion

1921 Pacific Coast Conference football standings
	Conf.					Overall
Team	W		L		T	W		L		T
California $	4	–	0	–	0	9	–	0	–	1
Washington State	2	–	1	–	1	4	–	2	–	1
Stanford	1	–	1	–	1	4	–	2	–	2
Oregon Agricultural	1	–	2	–	1	4	–	3	–	2
Oregon	0	–	1	–	2	5	–	1	–	3
Washington	0	–	3	–	1	3	–	4	–	1
$ – Conference champion

1921 Rocky Mountain Conference football standings
	Conf.					Overall
Team	W		L		T	W		L		T
Utah Agricultural $	4	–	0	–	0	7	–	1	–	0
Colorado	4	–	0	–	1	4	–	1	–	1
Utah	2	–	1	–	1	3	–	2	–	1
Denver	2	–	2	–	1	4	–	2	–	1
Colorado Agricultural	2	–	2	–	1	2	–	3	–	1
Colorado College	2	–	4	–	0	4	–	4	–	0
Wyoming	1	–	3	–	2	1	–	4	–	2
Colorado Mines	1	–	5	–	0	1	–	5	–	0
Montana State	0	–	1	–	0	2	–	4	–	0
$ – Conference champion

1921 South Atlantic Intercollegiate Athletic Association football standings
	Conf.					Overall
Team	W		L		T	W		L		T
Washington and Lee $	2	–	0	–	0	6	–	3	–	0
Georgetown	1	–	0	–	0	8	–	1	–	0
Virginia	5	–	1	–	0	5	–	4	–	0
North Carolina	3	–	1	–	1	5	–	2	–	2
VPI	4	–	2	–	0	7	–	3	–	0
Maryland	2	–	1	–	1	3	–	5	–	1
Richmond	2	–	2	–	1	4	–	3	–	1
Catholic University	2	–	2	–	0	3	–	5	–	0
NC State	1	–	1	–	3	3	–	3	–	3
William & Mary	1	–	3	–	1	4	–	3	–	1
Trinity (NC)	0	–	1	–	0	6	–	1	–	2
Davidson	0	–	1	–	3	3	–	4	–	3
Johns Hopkins	0	–	2	–	0	6	–	3	–	0
VMI	0	–	3	–	1	3	–	5	–	1
George Washington	0	–	3	–	1	3	–	3	–	2
$ – Conference champion

1921 Southern Intercollegiate Athletic Association football standings
	Conf.					Overall
Team	W		L		T	W		L		T
Centre +	5	–	0	–	0	10	–	1	–	0
Georgia +	6	–	0	–	1	7	–	2	–	1
Georgia Tech +	5	–	0	–	0	8	–	1	–	0
Vanderbilt +	5	–	0	–	1	7	–	0	–	1
Tennessee	4	–	1	–	1	6	–	2	–	1
Florida	4	–	1	–	2	6	–	3	–	2
Mississippi College	3	–	1	–	1	7	–	2	–	1
Sewanee	4	–	2	–	0	6	–	2	–	0
Transylvania	2	–	1	–	0	4	–	4	–	0
LSU	2	–	1	–	1	6	–	1	–	1
South Carolina	2	–	1	–	1	5	–	1	–	2
Furman	4	–	2	–	1	7	–	2	–	1
Auburn	3	–	2	–	0	5	–	3	–	0
Mississippi A&M	2	–	3	–	1	4	–	4	–	1
Tulane	3	–	4	–	0	4	–	6	–	0
Alabama	2	–	4	–	2	5	–	4	–	2
Oglethorpe	2	–	4	–	0	5	–	4	–	0
Chattanooga	2	–	4	–	0	4	–	6	–	0
The Citadel	1	–	2	–	1	3	–	3	–	2
Kentucky	1	–	3	–	1	4	–	3	–	1
Ole Miss	1	–	4	–	0	3	–	6	–	0
Howard (AL)	1	–	4	–	0	3	–	6	–	0
Mercer	1	–	5	–	0	3	–	6	–	0
Louisville	0	–	1	–	0	2	–	2	–	1
Wofford	0	–	2	–	0	2	–	7	–	0
Georgetown (KY)	0	–	3	–	0	2	–	6	–	0
Millsaps	0	–	3	–	0	1	–	5	–	1
Clemson	0	–	5	–	2	1	–	6	–	2
+ – Conference co-champions

1921 Southwest Conference football standings
	Conf.					Overall
Team	W		L		T	W		L		T
Texas A&M $	3	–	0	–	2	6	–	1	–	2
Texas	1	–	0	–	1	6	–	1	–	1
Arkansas	2	–	1	–	0	5	–	3	–	1
Baylor	2	–	2	–	0	8	–	3	–	0
Oklahoma A&M	1	–	1	–	0	5	–	4	–	1
Rice	1	–	2	–	1	4	–	4	–	1
SMU	0	–	4	–	0	1	–	6	–	1
$ – Conference champion

=== Independents ===
1921 Eastern college football independents records
	Conf.			Overall
Team	W	L	T	W		L		T
Washington & Jefferson		–		10	–	0	–	1
Lafayette		–		9	–	0	–	0
Cornell		–		8	–	0	–	0
Penn State		–		8	–	0	–	2
Yale		–		8	–	1	–	0
New Hampshire		–		8	–	1	–	1
Franklin & Marshall		–		6	–	1	–	2
Villanova		–		6	–	1	–	2
Carnegie Tech		–		7	–	2	–	0
Syracuse		–		7	–	2	–	0
Harvard		–		7	–	2	–	1
Boston University		–		6	–	2	–	0
Dartmouth		–		6	–	2	–	1
Brown		–		5	–	3	–	1
Bucknell		–		5	–	3	–	1
Geneva		–		5	–	3	–	1
Pittsburgh		–		5	–	3	–	1
Holy Cross		–		5	–	3	–	0
Army		–		6	–	4	–	0
Princeton		–		4	–	3	–	0
Boston College		–		4	–	3	–	1
Fordham		–		4	–	3	–	2
Penn		–		4	–	3	–	2
Colgate		–		4	–	4	–	2
Lehigh		–		4	–	4	–	0
Springfield		–		4	–	5	–	2
Vermont		–		3	–	4	–	0
NYU		–		2	–	3	–	3
Buffalo		–		2	–	3	–	2
Drexel		–		2	–	3	–	1
Rutgers		–		4	–	6	–	0
Rhode Island State		–		3	–	5	–	0
Columbia		–		2	–	6	–	0
Tufts		–		1	–	5	–	2
Duquesne		–		0	–	4	–	1

1921 Midwestern college football independents records
	Conf.			Overall
Team	W	L	T	W		L		T
Detroit Junior College		–		6	–	0	–	2
Notre Dame		–		10	–	1	–	0
Creighton		–		8	–	1	–	0
Detroit		–		8	–	1	–	0
South Dakota State		–		7	–	1	–	0
Kirksville Osteopaths		–		6	–	1	–	0
Iowa State Teachers		–		5	–	1	–	1
Wabash		–		7	–	2	–	0
Central Michigan		–		7	–	2	–	1
Butler		–		6	–	2	–	0
Western State Normal		–		6	–	2	–	0
Marquette		–		6	–	2	–	1
DePauw		–		4	–	3	–	0
Haskell		–		5	–	4	–	0
Michigan Mines		–		1	–	1	–	0
North Dakota Agricultural		–		3	–	3	–	1
Saint Louis		–		4	–	4	–	1
Valparaiso		–		2	–	2	–	1
Michigan Agricultural		–		3	–	5	–	0
Northern Illinois State		–		3	–	5	–	0
Earlham		–		2	–	4	–	1
St. Ignatius (OH)		–		2	–	6	–	0
Dayton		–		1	–	7	–	1
Kent State		–		0	–	2	–	1

1921 Southern college football independents records
	Conf.			Overall
Team	W	L	T	W		L		T
Tennessee Docs		–		8	–	0	–	0
Southwest Texas State		–		7	–	0	–	0
Talladega		–		4	–	0	–	1
Navy		–		6	–	1	–	0
Sam Houston Normal		–		3	–	1	–	2
Erskine		–		6	–	2	–	0
Marshall		–		5	–	2	–	1
Delaware		–		5	–	4	–	0
West Virginia		–		5	–	4	–	1
Middle Tennessee State Normal		–		3	–	2	–	1
East Tennessee State Normal		–		4	–	3	–	0
Birmingham–Southern		–		4	–	4	–	1
Louisville		–		2	–	2	–	1
Marion		–		4	–	4	–	0
Spring Hill		–		4	–	4	–	0
West Tennessee State Normal		–		4	–	5	–	1
Mississippi Normal		–		3	–	4	–	0
Western Kentucky State Normal		–		2	–	4	–	1
Loyola (LA)		–		2	–	4	–	0
Roanoke		–		3	–	7	–	0
Abilene Christian		–		2	–	5	–	0
Bryson College		–		2	–	5	–	0
Stetson		–		1	–	4	–	0
Texas Mines		–		1	–	4	–	0
Wake Forest		–		2	–	8	–	0
Presbyterian		–		1	–	7	–	0

1921 Western college football independents records
	Conf.			Overall
Team	W	L	T	W		L		T
USC		–		10	–	1	–	0
Arizona		–		7	–	2	–	0
Santa Clara		–		6	–	0	–	0
La Verne		–		4	–	2	–	1
Chico State		–		4	–	3	–	1
Nevada		–		4	–	3	–	1
Saint Mary's		–		4	–	3	–	0
Hawaii		–		3	–	3	–	2
Pacific (CA)		–		3	–	3	–	0
University Farm		–		3	–	4	–	0
New Mexico		–		2	–	2	–	0
New Mexico A&M		–		2	–	2	–	0
Gonzaga		–		2	–	4	–	1
Fresno State		–		2	–	4	–	0
San Jose State		–		1	–	5	–	0

=== Minor conferences ===
Conference	Champion(s)	Record
Central Intercollegiate Athletics Association	Virginia Union	3–0
Inter-Normal Athletic Conference of Wisconsin	Stout Normal	3–0
Kansas Collegiate Athletic Conference	Kansas State Teachers; Kansas State Teachers–Fort Hays	6–0–1; 6–0
Louisiana Intercollegiate Athletic Association	Louisiana Polytechnic	3–0
Michigan Intercollegiate Athletic Association	No champion	–
Minnesota Intercollegiate Athletic Conference	Hamline	5–0
Nebraska Intercollegiate Conference	Unknown	—
Ohio Athletic Conference	Miami (OH)	7–0
Oklahoma Intercollegiate Conference	Unknown	—
Southern California Intercollegiate Athletic Conference	Pomona	5–0
Southern Intercollegiate Athletic Conference	Morehouse	—
Southwestern Athletic Conference	Wiley	—

=== Minor conference standings ===
1921 Colored Intercollegiate Athletic Association football standings
	Conf.					Overall
Team	W		L		T	W		L		T
Virginia Union $	3	–	0	–	0	6	–	0	–	2
Howard	4	–	1	–	0	7	–	1	–	0
Lincoln (PA)	2	–	1	–	0	8	–	1	–	0
Virginia Normal	1	–	1	–	0	2	–	1	–	1
Hampton	1	–	3	–	0	2	–	3	–	0
Shaw	0	–	2	–	0	?	–	?	–	0
Virginia Seminary	0	–	3	–	0	4	–	4	–	0
$ – Conference champion

1921 Illinois Intercollegiate Athletic Conference football standings
	Conf.					Overall
Team	W		L		T	W		L		T
Carthage	4	–	2	–	0	6	–	2	–	0
Southern Illinois			–			4	–	3	–	2

1921 Kansas Collegiate Athletic Conference football standings
	Conf.					Overall
Team	W		L		T	W		L		T
Hays Normal $	6	–	0	–	0	6	–	1	–	0
Kansas State Normal	6	–	1	–	0	6	–	1	–	0
Pittsburg Normal	5	–	1	–	1	7	–	2	–	1
College of Emporia	4	–	1	–	0	4	–	2	–	1
Fairmount	4	–	2	–	1	5	–	2	–	1
Bethany (KS)	4	–	3	–	0	5	–	3	–	0
Baker	4	–	3	–	1	5	–	3	–	1
Southwestern (KS)	4	–	4	–	0	5	–	4	–	0
Friends	3	–	3	–	1	3	–	4	–	1
Washburn	3	–	3	–	1	3	–	5	–	1
St. Mary's (KS)	2	–	5	–	0	3	–	5	–	0
Ottawa	2	–	5	–	1	3	–	5	–	1
McPherson	2	–	6	–	0	5	–	6	–	0
Sterling	1	–	6	–	0	1	–	6	–	0
Kansas Wesleyan	0	–	7	–	0	0	–	8	–	0
$ – Conference champion

1921 Michigan Intercollegiate Athletic Association football standings
	Conf.					Overall
Team	W		L		T	W		L		T
Kalamazoo $	3	–	0	–	0	7	–	2	–	0
Albion	4	–	1	–	0	6	–	2	–	0
Hillsdale	2	–	2	–	0	5	–	3	–	0
Michigan State Normal	1	–	2	–	0	3	–	3	–	0
Olivet	1	–	3	–	0	2	–	5	–	1
Alma	1	–	4	–	0	2	–	6	–	1
$ – Conference champion

1921 Minnesota Intercollegiate Athletic Conference football standings
	Conf.					Overall
Team	W		L		T	W		L		T
Hamline $	5	–	0	–	0	7	–	0	–	0
Carleton	3	–	1	–	0	6	–	1	–	0
St. Olaf	3	–	2	–	0	4	–	2	–	0
St. Thomas (MN)	2	–	2	–	0	4	–	2	–	0
Macalester	2	–	2	–	0	2	–	2	–	1
Concordia (MN)	0	–	2	–	0	2	–	3	–	1
Saint John's (MN)	0	–	2	–	0	1	–	4	–	0
Gustavus Adolphus	0	–	4	–	0	2	–	4	–	0
$ – Conference champion

1921 Missouri Intercollegiate Athletic Association football standings
	Conf.					Overall
Team	W		L		T	W		L		T
Missouri Wesleyan +	6	–	1	–	0	7	–	1	–	0
Kirksville +	6	–	1	–	0	7	–	2	–	0
William Jewell +	6	–	1	–	0	6	–	2	–	0
Missouri Mines	4	–	1	–	0	4	–	4	–	0
Central (MO)	3	–	2	–	0	5	–	2	–	0
Tarkio	3	–	3	–	0	3	–	6	–	0
Springfield (MO)	3	–	4	–	0	3	–	5	–	0
Warrensburg	2	–	3	–	0	2	–	5	–	1
Missouri Valley	1	–	2	–	2	2	–	2	–	3
Drury	1	–	4	–	1	2	–	5	–	1
Westminster (MO)	1	–	4	–	1	2	–	5	–	1
Maryville (MO)	1	–	4	–	0	2	–	6	–	0
Culver–Stockton	0	–	2	–	0	3	–	4	–	0
Cape Girardeau	0	–	2	–	0	1	–	3	–	2
Central Wesleyan	0	–	3	–	0	0	–	4	–	1
+ – Conference co-champions

1921 Nebraska Intercollegiate Conference football standings
	Conf.					Overall
Team	W		L		T	W		L		T
Nebraska Wesleyan $	5	–	0	–	0	8	–	3	–	0
Wayne Normal	5	–	0	–	0	6	–	2	–	0
Doane	4	–	2	–	1	5	–	3	–	1
Peru Normal	5	–	3	–	0	6	–	1	–	0
Kearney Normal	3	–	2	–	1	3	–	2	–	1
Hastings	3	–	3	–	2	4	–	3	–	2
York (NE)	3	–	4	–	0	3	–	5	–	0
Cotner	2	–	3	–	0	2	–	3	–	2
Midland	2	–	4	–	0	3	–	4	–	0
Grand Island	1	–	4	–	1	1	–	5	–	1
Chadron Normal	0	–	3	–	0	2	–	4	–	0
Nebraska Central	0	–	5	–	0	0	–	5	–	0
Championship: Nebraska Wesleyan 17, Wayne Normal 3
$ – Conference champion

1921 Northwest Ohio League football standings
	Conf.					Overall
Team	W		L		T	W		L		T
Bowling Green $	3	–	0	–	0	3	–	1	–	1
Toledo			–			3	–	5	–	0
Findlay	0	–	3	–	0	0	–	3	–	0
$ – Conference champion

1921 Ohio Athletic Conference football standings
	Conf.					Overall
Team	W		L		T	W		L		T
Miami (OH) $	7	–	0	–	0	8	–	0	–	0
St. Xavier	1	–	0	–	0	6	–	2	–	0
Oberlin	7	–	0	–	1	7	–	0	–	1
Case	6	–	1	–	2	6	–	2	–	2
Wooster	6	–	2	–	0	6	–	2	–	0
Denison	5	–	2	–	0	5	–	3	–	0
Akron	4	–	3	–	0	5	–	3	–	0
Ohio Northern	4	–	3	–	0	5	–	4	–	0
Ohio State	1	–	1	–	0	5	–	2	–	0
Wittenberg	3	–	3	–	2	4	–	3	–	2
Kenyon	1	–	1	–	4	1	–	1	–	5
Ohio	1	–	1	–	0	4	–	4	–	1
Otterbein	1	–	3	–	2	1	–	5	–	2
Western Reserve	2	–	5	–	1	2	–	7	–	1
Hiram	1	–	4	–	2	2	–	4	–	2
Ohio Wesleyan	1	–	6	–	1	1	–	6	–	1
Mount Union	0	–	5	–	1	1	–	6	–	1
Cincinnati	0	–	4	–	0	3	–	6	–	0
Heidelberg	0	–	7	–	0	0	–	7	–	1
$ – Conference champion

1921 South Dakota Intercollegiate Conference football standings
	Conf.					Overall
Team	W		L		T	W		L		T
Dakota Wesleyan $	3	–	0	–	0	6	–	2	–	0
Columbus (SD)	2	–	1	–	0	5	–	2	–	0
Huron	1	–	2	–	0	3	–	3	–	0
Yankton	1	–	2	–	0	3	–	4	–	0
South Dakota Mines	1	–	2	–	0	2	–	4	–	1
Northern Normal	1	–	2	–	0	1	–	4	–	0
$ – Conference champion

1921 Southern California Conference football standings
	Conf.					Overall
Team	W		L		T	W		L		T
Whittier $	5	–	0	–	0	5	–	2	–	0
Redlands	4	–	1	–	0	5	–	2	–	1
Occidental	2	–	2	–	1	2	–	4	–	1
Pomona	2	–	2	–	1	2	–	3	–	1
Caltech	1	–	4	–	0	2	–	5	–	1
Southern Branch	0	–	5	–	0	0	–	5	–	0
$ – Conference champion

1921 Southwestern Athletic Conference football standings
	Conf.			Overall
Team	W	L	T	W		L		T
Wiley $		–		7	–	0	–	1
Bishop		–				–
Paul Quinn		–				–
Prairie View State		–				–
Samuel Huston		–				–
Texas College		–				–
$ – Conference champion

1921 Spokane Intercollegiate Conference football standings
	Conf.					Overall
Team	W		L		T	W		L		T
Cheney Normal $	3	–	0	–	0	3	–	3	–	0
Whitworth	4	–	1	–	0	5	–	1	–	0
Spokane College	1	–	3	–	1	?	–	?	–	?
Spokane University	0	–	4	–	1	?	–	?	–	?
$ – Conference champion

1921 Texas Intercollegiate Athletic Association football standings
	Conf.					Overall
Team	W		L		T	W		L		T
Rice $	3	–	0	–	0	4	–	4	–	1
Howard Payne	4	–	1	–	0	5	–	3	–	0
TCU	2	–	1	–	0	6	–	3	–	1
Simmons (TX)	3	–	2	–	0	6	–	4	–	0
Austin	3	–	2	–	0	5	–	4	–	0
Trinity (TX)	2	–	4	–	0	4	–	4	–	0
SMU	1	–	3	–	1	1	–	6	–	1
Daniel Baker	0	–	2	–	0	3	–	4	–	1
Southwestern (TX)	0	–	3	–	1	0	–	6	–	1
$ – Conference champion

1921 Wisconsin Normal Athletic Conference football standings
	Conf.					Overall
Team	W		L		T	W		L		T
Stout Normal $	3	–	0	–	0	5	–	0	–	2
Oshkosh Normal	3	–	1	–	0	5	–	2	–	0
La Crosse Normal	3	–	1	–	1	5	–	1	–	1
Superior Normal	2	–	1	–	1	5	–	1	–	1
Stevens Point Normal	1	–	1	–	1	3	–	2	–	1
Whitewater Normal	2	–	2	–	0	3	–	2	–	1
Eau Claire Normal	1	–	2	–	1	2	–	2	–	1
River Falls Normal	1	–	3	–	1	3	–	4	–	1
Milwaukee Normal	0	–	2	–	1	4	–	2	–	1
Platteville Normal	0	–	3	–	0	4	–	3	–	0
$ – Conference champion

== Awards and honors ==
=== All-Americans ===
The consensus All-America team included:

Position	Name	Height	Weight (lbs.)	Class	Hometown	Team
QB	Aubrey Devine	5'9"	170	Sr.	Des Moines, Iowa	Iowa
QB	Bo McMillin	5'9"	165	Sr.	Fort Worth, Texas	Centre
HB	Glenn Killinger	5'9"	163	Sr.	Harrisburg, Pennsylvania	Penn State
HB	Mal Aldrich	5'11"	165	Sr.	Fall River, Massachusetts	Yale
FB	Eddie Kaw	5'10"	168	Jr.	Houston, Texas	Cornell
E	Harold Muller	6'0"	180	Jr.	Dunsmuir, California	California
T	Dan McMillan	6'1"	225	Sr.	Los Angeles, California	California
G	Fiske Brown			Sr.	Plymouth, Massachusetts	Harvard
G	Stan Keck	5'11"	206	Sr.	Greensburg, Pennsylvania	Princeton
C	Herb Stein	6'1"	186	Sr.	Warren, Ohio	Pittsburgh
G	Frank Schwab	5'11"	195	Sr.	Saltsburg, Pennsylvania	Lafayette
G	Iolas Huffman	5'11"	228	Sr.	Chandlersville, Ohio	Ohio State
E	Eddie Anderson			Sr.	Mason City, Iowa	Notre Dame

== Statistical leaders ==
- Total offense leader: Aubrey Devine, Iowa, 2211
- Receptions leader: Eddie Anderson, Notre Dame, 26
- Receiving yards leader: Eddie Anderson, 394
