= 1921 Maine Black Bears football team =

American college football season

1921 Maine Black Bears football
- Conference: Maine Intercollegiate Athletic Association
- Record: 2–5–1 (0–2–1 MIAA)
- Head coach: Fred Brice (1st season)
- Home stadium: Alumni Field

The 1921 Maine Black Bears football team was an American football team that represented the University of Maine during the 1921 college football season. In its first season under head coach Fred Brice, the team compiled a 2–5–1 record.

== Schedule ==
Date	Opponent	Site	Result	Source
September 24	at Fordham*	Fordham Field; Bronx, NY	L 14–25	
October 1	Norwich*	Alumni Field; Orono, ME	L 0–14	
October 8	Lowell Textile*	Alumni Field; Orono, ME	W 34–0	
October 15	Rhode Island State*	Alumni Field; Orono, ME	W 7–3	
October 22	at Bates	Garcelon Field; Lewiston, ME	T 7–7	
October 29	at Colby	Seaverns Field; Waterville, ME	L 0–3	
November 5	Bowdoin	Alumni Field; Orono, ME	L 7–14	
November 12	at Stevens*	Hoboken, NJ	L 7–34	
*Non-conference game
