= 1921 Bucknell football team =

American college football season

1921 Bucknell football
- Conference: Independent
- Record: 5–3–1
- Head coach: Pete Reynolds (3rd season)
- Home stadium: Tustin Field

1921 Eastern college football independents records
	Conf.			Overall
Team	W	L	T	W		L		T
Washington & Jefferson		–		10	–	0	–	1
Lafayette		–		9	–	0	–	0
Cornell		–		8	–	0	–	0
Penn State		–		8	–	0	–	2
Yale		–		8	–	1	–	0
New Hampshire		–		8	–	1	–	1
Franklin & Marshall		–		6	–	1	–	2
Villanova		–		6	–	1	–	2
Carnegie Tech		–		7	–	2	–	0
Syracuse		–		7	–	2	–	0
Harvard		–		7	–	2	–	1
Boston University		–		6	–	2	–	0
Dartmouth		–		6	–	2	–	1
Brown		–		5	–	3	–	1
Bucknell		–		5	–	3	–	1
Geneva		–		5	–	3	–	1
Pittsburgh		–		5	–	3	–	1
Holy Cross		–		5	–	3	–	0
Army		–		6	–	4	–	0
Princeton		–		4	–	3	–	0
Boston College		–		4	–	3	–	1
Fordham		–		4	–	3	–	2
Penn		–		4	–	3	–	2
Colgate		–		4	–	4	–	2
Lehigh		–		4	–	4	–	0
Springfield		–		4	–	5	–	2
Vermont		–		3	–	4	–	0
NYU		–		2	–	3	–	3
Buffalo		–		2	–	3	–	2
Drexel		–		2	–	3	–	1
Rutgers		–		4	–	6	–	0
Rhode Island State		–		3	–	5	–	0
Columbia		–		2	–	6	–	0
Tufts		–		1	–	5	–	2
Duquesne		–		0	–	4	–	1

The 1921 Bucknell football team was an American football team that represented Bucknell University as an independent during the 1921 college football season. In its third season under head coach Pete Reynolds, the team compiled a 5–3–1 record and outscored opponents by a total of 179 to 66.

== Schedule ==
Date	Opponent	Site	Result	Attendance	Source
October 1	at Washington & Jefferson	College Field; Washington, PA	L 0–26	> 6,000	
October 8	at Muhlenberg	Allentown, PA	W 14–0		
October 15	Lafayette^{†}	Tustin Field; Lewisburg, PA	L 7–20		
October 22	at West Virginia	Morgantown, WV	T 0–0		
October 29	Catholic University	Tustin Field; Lewisburg, PA	W 41–0		
November 5	at Navy	Worden Field; Annapolis, MD	L 0–6		
November 12	at Gettysburg	Gettysburg, PA	W 34–7		
November 19	Susquehanna	Tustin Field; Lewisburg, PA	W 62–7		
November 24	at Dickinson	Carlisle, PA	W 21–0		
^{†}Homecoming
