= 1921 Syracuse Orangemen football team =

American college football season

1921 Syracuse Orangemen football
- Conference: Independent
- Record: 7–2
- Head coach: Chick Meehan (2nd season)
- Captain: Bertrand Gulick
- Home stadium: Archbold Stadium

1921 Eastern college football independents records
	Conf.			Overall
Team	W	L	T	W		L		T
Washington & Jefferson		–		10	–	0	–	1
Lafayette		–		9	–	0	–	0
Cornell		–		8	–	0	–	0
Penn State		–		8	–	0	–	2
Yale		–		8	–	1	–	0
New Hampshire		–		8	–	1	–	1
Franklin & Marshall		–		6	–	1	–	2
Villanova		–		6	–	1	–	2
Carnegie Tech		–		7	–	2	–	0
Syracuse		–		7	–	2	–	0
Harvard		–		7	–	2	–	1
Boston University		–		6	–	2	–	0
Dartmouth		–		6	–	2	–	1
Brown		–		5	–	3	–	1
Bucknell		–		5	–	3	–	1
Geneva		–		5	–	3	–	1
Pittsburgh		–		5	–	3	–	1
Holy Cross		–		5	–	3	–	0
Army		–		6	–	4	–	0
Princeton		–		4	–	3	–	0
Boston College		–		4	–	3	–	1
Fordham		–		4	–	3	–	2
Penn		–		4	–	3	–	2
Colgate		–		4	–	4	–	2
Lehigh		–		4	–	4	–	0
Springfield		–		4	–	5	–	2
Vermont		–		3	–	4	–	0
NYU		–		2	–	3	–	3
Buffalo		–		2	–	3	–	2
Drexel		–		2	–	3	–	1
Rutgers		–		4	–	6	–	0
Rhode Island State		–		3	–	5	–	0
Columbia		–		2	–	6	–	0
Tufts		–		1	–	5	–	2
Duquesne		–		0	–	4	–	1

The 1921 Syracuse Orangemen football team represented Syracuse University as an independent during the 1921 college football season.

== Schedule ==
Date	Opponent	Site	Result	Attendance	Source
September 24	Hobart	Archbold Stadium; Syracuse, NY	W 35–0	12,000	
October 1	Ohio	Archbold Stadium; Syracuse, NY	W 38–0	12,000	
October 8	Maryland	Archbold Stadium; Syracuse, NY	W 42–0	9,000	
October 15	Brown	Archbold Stadium; Syracuse, NY	W 28–0	20,000	
October 22	at Pittsburgh	Forbes Field; Pittsburgh, PA (rivalry)	L 0–30	22,000–30,000	
October 29	Washington & Jefferson	Archbold Stadium; Syracuse, NY	L 10–15	15,000	
November 5	at McGill	(Canada) Molson Memorial Stadium; Montreal, QC	W 13–0	6,000	
November 12	Colgate	Archbold Stadium; Syracuse, NY (rivalry)	W 14–0	12,000	
November 19	vs. Dartmouth	Polo Grounds; New York, NY	W 14–7	15,000	
