= 1921 NYU Violets football team =

American college football season

1921 NYU Violets football
- Conference: Independent
- Record: 2–3–3
- Head coach: Frank Gargan (2nd season)
- Home stadium: Ohio Field

1921 Eastern college football independents records
	Conf.			Overall
Team	W	L	T	W		L		T
Washington & Jefferson		–		10	–	0	–	1
Lafayette		–		9	–	0	–	0
Cornell		–		8	–	0	–	0
Penn State		–		8	–	0	–	2
Yale		–		8	–	1	–	0
New Hampshire		–		8	–	1	–	1
Franklin & Marshall		–		6	–	1	–	2
Villanova		–		6	–	1	–	2
Carnegie Tech		–		7	–	2	–	0
Syracuse		–		7	–	2	–	0
Harvard		–		7	–	2	–	1
Boston University		–		6	–	2	–	0
Dartmouth		–		6	–	2	–	1
Brown		–		5	–	3	–	1
Bucknell		–		5	–	3	–	1
Geneva		–		5	–	3	–	1
Pittsburgh		–		5	–	3	–	1
Holy Cross		–		5	–	3	–	0
Army		–		6	–	4	–	0
Princeton		–		4	–	3	–	0
Boston College		–		4	–	3	–	1
Fordham		–		4	–	3	–	2
Penn		–		4	–	3	–	2
Colgate		–		4	–	4	–	2
Lehigh		–		4	–	4	–	0
Springfield		–		4	–	5	–	2
Vermont		–		3	–	4	–	0
NYU		–		2	–	3	–	3
Buffalo		–		2	–	3	–	2
Drexel		–		2	–	3	–	1
Rutgers		–		4	–	6	–	0
Rhode Island State		–		3	–	5	–	0
Columbia		–		2	–	6	–	0
Tufts		–		1	–	5	–	2
Duquesne		–		0	–	4	–	1

The 1921 NYU Violets football team was an American football team that represented New York University as an independent during the 1921 college football season. In their second year under head coach Frank Gargan, the team compiled a 2–3–3 record.

== Schedule ==
Date	Opponent	Site	Result	Attendance	Source
October 1	Hobart	Ohio Field; Bronx, NY	W 26–0		
October 8	at Brown	Andrews Field; Providence, RI	L 0–13		
October 15	at Columbia	South Field; New York, NY	L 0–19	12,000	
October 22	Wesleyan	Ohio Field; Bronx, NY	T 7–7		
October 29	vs. Colgate	Johnson Field; Johnson City, NY	T 7–7	10,000	
November 8	Trinity (CT)	Ohio Field; Bronx, NY	W 28–0		
November 12	Rutgers	Ohio Field; Bronx, NY	L 7–21		
November 19	Trinity (NC)	Ohio Field; Bronx, NY	T 7–7	5,000	
