= 1921 Holy Cross football team =

American college football season

1921 Holy Cross football
- Conference: Independent
- Record: 5–3
- Head coach: Cleo A. O'Donnell (3rd season)
- Home stadium: Fitton Field

1921 Eastern college football independents records
| | Conf. | | | Overall |
| Team | W | L | T | W | | L | | T |
|---|---|---|---|---|---|---|---|---|
| Washington & Jefferson | | – | | 10 | – | 0 | – | 1 |
| Lafayette | | – | | 9 | – | 0 | – | 0 |
| Cornell | | – | | 8 | – | 0 | – | 0 |
| Penn State | | – | | 8 | – | 0 | – | 2 |
| Yale | | – | | 8 | – | 1 | – | 0 |
| New Hampshire | | – | | 8 | – | 1 | – | 1 |
| Franklin & Marshall | | – | | 6 | – | 1 | – | 2 |
| Villanova | | – | | 6 | – | 1 | – | 2 |
| Carnegie Tech | | – | | 7 | – | 2 | – | 0 |
| Syracuse | | – | | 7 | – | 2 | – | 0 |
| Harvard | | – | | 7 | – | 2 | – | 1 |
| Boston University | | – | | 6 | – | 2 | – | 0 |
| Dartmouth | | – | | 6 | – | 2 | – | 1 |
| Brown | | – | | 5 | – | 3 | – | 1 |
| Bucknell | | – | | 5 | – | 3 | – | 1 |
| Geneva | | – | | 5 | – | 3 | – | 1 |
| Pittsburgh | | – | | 5 | – | 3 | – | 1 |
| Holy Cross | | – | | 5 | – | 3 | – | 0 |
| Army | | – | | 6 | – | 4 | – | 0 |
| Princeton | | – | | 4 | – | 3 | – | 0 |
| Boston College | | – | | 4 | – | 3 | – | 1 |
| Fordham | | – | | 4 | – | 3 | – | 2 |
| Penn | | – | | 4 | – | 3 | – | 2 |
| Colgate | | – | | 4 | – | 4 | – | 2 |
| Lehigh | | – | | 4 | – | 4 | – | 0 |
| Springfield | | – | | 4 | – | 5 | – | 2 |
| Vermont | | – | | 3 | – | 4 | – | 0 |
| NYU | | – | | 2 | – | 3 | – | 3 |
| Buffalo | | – | | 2 | – | 3 | – | 2 |
| Drexel | | – | | 2 | – | 3 | – | 1 |
| Rutgers | | – | | 4 | – | 6 | – | 0 |
| Rhode Island State | | – | | 3 | – | 5 | – | 0 |
| Columbia | | – | | 2 | – | 6 | – | 0 |
| Tufts | | – | | 1 | – | 5 | – | 2 |
| Duquesne | | – | | 0 | – | 4 | – | 1 |

The 1921 Holy Cross football team was an American football team that represented the College of the Holy Cross as an independent during the 1921 college football season. In its third season under head coach Cleo A. O'Donnell, the team compiled a 5–3 record. The team played its home games at Fitton Field in Worcester, Massachusetts.

== Schedule ==
| Date | Time | Opponent | Site | Result | Attendance | Source |
|---|---|---|---|---|---|---|
| October 1 | | at Harvard | Harvard Stadium; Boston, MA | L 0–3 | | |
| October 8 | | Canisius | Fitton Field; Worcester, MA | W 44–0 | | |
| October 12 | | at Springfield | Pratt Field; Springfield, MA | W 12–0 | 8,000 | |
| October 22 | | Georgetown | Fitton Field; Worcester, MA | L 7–28 | 6,000 | |
| October 29 | | Bates | Fitton Field; Worcester, MA | W 28–0 | | |
| November 12 | | Colby | Fitton Field; Worcester, MA | W 14–0 | | |
| November 19 | | at New Hampshire | Textile Field; Manchester, NH | L 7–13 | 12,000 | |
| November 26 | 2:00 p.m. | vs. Boston College | Braves Field; Boston, MA (rivalry) | W 41–0 | | |
All times are in Eastern time
