= 1921 Fordham Maroon football team =

American college football season

1921 Fordham Maroon football
- Conference: Independent
- Record: 4–3
- Head coach: Joseph DuMoe (2nd season)
- Captain: Sylvester Fitzpatrick
- Home stadium: Fordham Field, Polo Grounds

1921 Eastern college football independents records
	Conf.			Overall
Team	W	L	T	W		L		T
Washington & Jefferson		–		10	–	0	–	1
Lafayette		–		9	–	0	–	0
Cornell		–		8	–	0	–	0
Penn State		–		8	–	0	–	2
Yale		–		8	–	1	–	0
New Hampshire		–		8	–	1	–	1
Franklin & Marshall		–		6	–	1	–	2
Villanova		–		6	–	1	–	2
Carnegie Tech		–		7	–	2	–	0
Syracuse		–		7	–	2	–	0
Harvard		–		7	–	2	–	1
Boston University		–		6	–	2	–	0
Dartmouth		–		6	–	2	–	1
Brown		–		5	–	3	–	1
Bucknell		–		5	–	3	–	1
Geneva		–		5	–	3	–	1
Pittsburgh		–		5	–	3	–	1
Holy Cross		–		5	–	3	–	0
Army		–		6	–	4	–	0
Princeton		–		4	–	3	–	0
Boston College		–		4	–	3	–	1
Fordham		–		4	–	3	–	2
Penn		–		4	–	3	–	2
Colgate		–		4	–	4	–	2
Lehigh		–		4	–	4	–	0
Springfield		–		4	–	5	–	2
Vermont		–		3	–	4	–	0
NYU		–		2	–	3	–	3
Buffalo		–		2	–	3	–	2
Drexel		–		2	–	3	–	1
Rutgers		–		4	–	6	–	0
Rhode Island State		–		3	–	5	–	0
Columbia		–		2	–	6	–	0
Tufts		–		1	–	5	–	2
Duquesne		–		0	–	4	–	1

The 1921 Fordham Maroon football team was an American football team that represented Fordham University as an independent during the 1921 college football season. In its second season under coach Joseph DuMoe, Fordham compiled a 4–3–2 record. Fordham's media guide claims a record of 5–3–1, listing the result against Villanova as a 20–19 victory.

== Schedule ==
Date	Opponent	Site	Result	Attendance	Source
September 24	Maine	Fordham Field; Bronx, NY	W 25–14		
October 1	Washington College	Fordham Field; Bronx, NY	W 101–0		
October 8	Catholic University	Fordham Field; Bronx, NY	W 10–0		
October 15	Villanova	Fordham Field; Bronx, NY	T 20–20		
October 22	Lafayette	Polo Grounds; New York, NY	L 7–28	10,000	
October 29	Boston College	Ebbets Field; Brooklyn, NY	T 0–0	5,000	
November 5	at Georgetown	American League Park; Washington, DC	L 7–34	7,000	
November 12	at Muhlenberg	Allentown, PA	L 7–12		
November 19	at Springfield	Pratt Field; Springfield, MA	W 14–0	5,000	
