= 1921 Boston University football team =

American college football season

1921 Boston University football
- Conference: Independent
- Record: 6–2
- Head coach: Charles Whelan (1st season)
- Captain: John J. O'Hare
- Home stadium: Braves Field

1921 Eastern college football independents records
| | Conf. | | | Overall |
| Team | W | L | T | W | | L | | T |
|---|---|---|---|---|---|---|---|---|
| Washington & Jefferson | | – | | 10 | – | 0 | – | 1 |
| Lafayette | | – | | 9 | – | 0 | – | 0 |
| Cornell | | – | | 8 | – | 0 | – | 0 |
| Penn State | | – | | 8 | – | 0 | – | 2 |
| Yale | | – | | 8 | – | 1 | – | 0 |
| New Hampshire | | – | | 8 | – | 1 | – | 1 |
| Franklin & Marshall | | – | | 6 | – | 1 | – | 2 |
| Villanova | | – | | 6 | – | 1 | – | 2 |
| Carnegie Tech | | – | | 7 | – | 2 | – | 0 |
| Syracuse | | – | | 7 | – | 2 | – | 0 |
| Harvard | | – | | 7 | – | 2 | – | 1 |
| Boston University | | – | | 6 | – | 2 | – | 0 |
| Dartmouth | | – | | 6 | – | 2 | – | 1 |
| Brown | | – | | 5 | – | 3 | – | 1 |
| Bucknell | | – | | 5 | – | 3 | – | 1 |
| Geneva | | – | | 5 | – | 3 | – | 1 |
| Pittsburgh | | – | | 5 | – | 3 | – | 1 |
| Holy Cross | | – | | 5 | – | 3 | – | 0 |
| Army | | – | | 6 | – | 4 | – | 0 |
| Princeton | | – | | 4 | – | 3 | – | 0 |
| Boston College | | – | | 4 | – | 3 | – | 1 |
| Fordham | | – | | 4 | – | 3 | – | 2 |
| Penn | | – | | 4 | – | 3 | – | 2 |
| Colgate | | – | | 4 | – | 4 | – | 2 |
| Lehigh | | – | | 4 | – | 4 | – | 0 |
| Springfield | | – | | 4 | – | 5 | – | 2 |
| Vermont | | – | | 3 | – | 4 | – | 0 |
| NYU | | – | | 2 | – | 3 | – | 3 |
| Buffalo | | – | | 2 | – | 3 | – | 2 |
| Drexel | | – | | 2 | – | 3 | – | 1 |
| Rutgers | | – | | 4 | – | 6 | – | 0 |
| Rhode Island State | | – | | 3 | – | 5 | – | 0 |
| Columbia | | – | | 2 | – | 6 | – | 0 |
| Tufts | | – | | 1 | – | 5 | – | 2 |
| Duquesne | | – | | 0 | – | 4 | – | 1 |

The 1921 Boston University football team was an American football team that represented Boston University as an independent during the 1921 college football season. In its first season under head coach Charles Whelan, the team compiled a 6–2 record and outscored opponents by a total of 115 to 44.

== Schedule ==
| Date | Opponent | Site | Result | Attendance | Source |
|---|---|---|---|---|---|
| September 24 | at Harvard | Harvard Stadium; Boston, MA | L 0–10 | 18,000 | |
| October 1 | at Boston College | Alumni Field; Newton, MA (rivalry) | L 0–13 | 5,000 | |
| October 8 | Worcester Tech | Braves Field; Boston, MA | W 52–0 | | |
| October 15 | at Wesleyan | Andrus Field; Middletown, CT | W 7–0 | | |
| October 22 | at Trinity (CT) | Trinity Field; Hartford, CT | W 14–0 | | |
| October 29 | Rhode Island State | Braves Field; Boston, MA | W 14–0 | | |
| November 5 | at Tufts | Medford Oval; Medford, MA | W 8–7 | | |
| November 12 | Norwich | Braves Field; Boston, MA | W 20–14 | | |
