= 1921 Washington & Jefferson Presidents football team =

American college football season

1921 Washington & Jefferson Presidents football
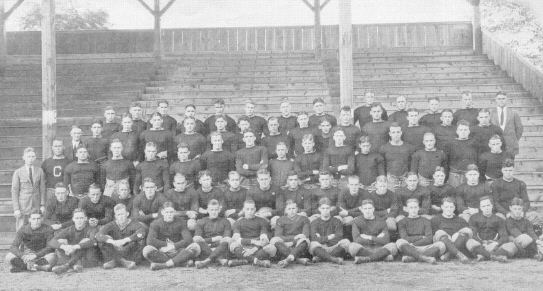

Co-national champion (Boand)

Rose Bowl, T 0–0 vs. California
- Conference: Independent
- Record: 10–0–1
- Head coach: Greasy Neale (1st season)
- Offensive scheme: Short-punt
- Home stadium: College Field

1921 Eastern college football independents records
| | Conf. | | | Overall |
| Team | W | L | T | W | | L | | T |
|---|---|---|---|---|---|---|---|---|
| Washington & Jefferson | | – | | 10 | – | 0 | – | 1 |
| Lafayette | | – | | 9 | – | 0 | – | 0 |
| Cornell | | – | | 8 | – | 0 | – | 0 |
| Penn State | | – | | 8 | – | 0 | – | 2 |
| Yale | | – | | 8 | – | 1 | – | 0 |
| New Hampshire | | – | | 8 | – | 1 | – | 1 |
| Franklin & Marshall | | – | | 6 | – | 1 | – | 2 |
| Villanova | | – | | 6 | – | 1 | – | 2 |
| Carnegie Tech | | – | | 7 | – | 2 | – | 0 |
| Syracuse | | – | | 7 | – | 2 | – | 0 |
| Harvard | | – | | 7 | – | 2 | – | 1 |
| Boston University | | – | | 6 | – | 2 | – | 0 |
| Dartmouth | | – | | 6 | – | 2 | – | 1 |
| Brown | | – | | 5 | – | 3 | – | 1 |
| Bucknell | | – | | 5 | – | 3 | – | 1 |
| Geneva | | – | | 5 | – | 3 | – | 1 |
| Pittsburgh | | – | | 5 | – | 3 | – | 1 |
| Holy Cross | | – | | 5 | – | 3 | – | 0 |
| Army | | – | | 6 | – | 4 | – | 0 |
| Princeton | | – | | 4 | – | 3 | – | 0 |
| Boston College | | – | | 4 | – | 3 | – | 1 |
| Fordham | | – | | 4 | – | 3 | – | 2 |
| Penn | | – | | 4 | – | 3 | – | 2 |
| Colgate | | – | | 4 | – | 4 | – | 2 |
| Lehigh | | – | | 4 | – | 4 | – | 0 |
| Springfield | | – | | 4 | – | 5 | – | 2 |
| Vermont | | – | | 3 | – | 4 | – | 0 |
| NYU | | – | | 2 | – | 3 | – | 3 |
| Buffalo | | – | | 2 | – | 3 | – | 2 |
| Drexel | | – | | 2 | – | 3 | – | 1 |
| Rutgers | | – | | 4 | – | 6 | – | 0 |
| Rhode Island State | | – | | 3 | – | 5 | – | 0 |
| Columbia | | – | | 2 | – | 6 | – | 0 |
| Tufts | | – | | 1 | – | 5 | – | 2 |
| Duquesne | | – | | 0 | – | 4 | – | 1 |

The 1921 Washington & Jefferson Presidents football team was an American football team that represented Washington & Jefferson College as an independent during the 1921 college football season. In their first year under head coach Greasy Neale, the Presidents compiled a 10–0 record, shut out seven of eleven opponents, and outscored all opponents by a total of 222 to 33. During the regular season, they defeated Pitt, Detroit, and Syracuse. Their 7–0 victory over rival Pitt was celebrated with a day of canceled classes and a bonfire with inspirational speeches in front of the Washington County Courthouse. They concluded their season with a tie against California in the 1922 Rose Bowl.

The Red and Black finished the season with a share of the 1921 national championship, as determined by the Boand System.

Tackle Russ Stein was selected by Walter Camp as a first-team All-American. Halfback Hal Erickson was selected as a second-team player on the 1921 All-Eastern football team. Charles Fremont West was the team's quarterback.

== Schedule ==
| Date | Opponent | Site | Result | Attendance | Source |
|---|---|---|---|---|---|
| September 24 | Bethany (WV) | College Field; Washington, PA | W 14–0 | > 6,000 | |
| October 1 | Bucknell | College Field; Washington, PA | W 26–0 | > 6,000 | |
| October 8 | West Virginia Wesleyan | College Field; Washington, PA | W 54–0 | | |
| October 15 | Carnegie Tech | College Field; Washington, PA | W 14–0 | 12,000 | |
| October 22 | at Lehigh | Taylor Stadium; Bethlehem, PA | W 14–7 | 5,000 | |
| October 29 | at Syracuse | Archbold Stadium; Syracuse, NY | W 17–10 | 15,000 | |
| November 5 | at Westminster (PA) | New Wilmington, PA | W 49–14 | | |
| November 12 | at Pittsburgh | Forbes Field; Pittsburgh, PA | W 7–0 | 28,000–30,000 | |
| November 24 | at West Virginia | Morgantown, WV | W 13–0 | | |
| December 3 | at Detroit | Navin Field; Detroit, MI | W 14–2 | 22,000 | |
| January 1 | vs. California | Tournament Park; Pasadena, CA (Rose Bowl) | T 0–0 | 40,000 | |

== Rose Bowl ==
As the best team from the east, W&J was invited to the 1922 Rose Bowl to play the best team from the west: the undefeated and heavily favored California Golden Bears. Some had even begun to call Cal the best team in college football history. The Red and Black sent 20 men on the cross-country trip and Robert M. Murphy mortgaged his home to pay his six family members’ way. W&J would be the last Rose Bowl team to play the same 11 men the entire game. During the train ride to Pasadena, in which Greasy Neale continued to prepare his men, Lee Spillers caught pneumonia and could not finish the journey. Ross "Bucky" Buchannan, a reserve player who had stowed away on the train and was fed smuggled sandwiches during the trip, was available to fill Spillers' roster spot.

The power of this Eastern eleven lay in its ability to rip through and smear opposing plays. Its uncanny faculty in this department was pronounced especially so in a season where the attack was featured and the offensive often given no great attention. Any attack in the country, including that bewildering onslaught launched by Notre Dame, would have found great trouble in hammering out any extensive distance against Neale's machine.

— Grantland Rice, describing the 1921 football team

Cal had outscored their opponents that season by a margin of 312–33; nevertheless, the W&J defense held the Golden Bears' potent offense, led by Brick Muller, to no points, 2 first downs, no completed passes, and only 49 yards rushing. In one of the most disputed plays in Rose Bowl history, a rushing touchdown for W&J was overturned for an offside penalty called on Wayne Brenkert. On another play, W&J's Hal Erickson slipped and fell on his way to scoring a sure touchdown. The contest ended in a scoreless draw. The game was notable as the last time a "small school" would be represented in the Rose Bowl. W&J's team featured two Rose Bowl firsts: Herb Kopf was the first freshman to play and Charlie "Pruner" West was the first African American to play quarterback. W&J's team captain, Russ Stein, was inducted into the Rose Bowl Hall of Fame in 1991.
