= 1921 Vermont Green and Gold football team =

American college football season

1921 Vermont Green and Gold football
- Conference: Independent
- Record: 3–4
- Head coach: Tom Keady (1st season)
- Home stadium: Centennial Field

1921 Eastern college football independents records
	Conf.			Overall
Team	W	L	T	W		L		T
Washington & Jefferson		–		10	–	0	–	1
Lafayette		–		9	–	0	–	0
Cornell		–		8	–	0	–	0
Penn State		–		8	–	0	–	2
Yale		–		8	–	1	–	0
New Hampshire		–		8	–	1	–	1
Franklin & Marshall		–		6	–	1	–	2
Villanova		–		6	–	1	–	2
Carnegie Tech		–		7	–	2	–	0
Syracuse		–		7	–	2	–	0
Harvard		–		7	–	2	–	1
Boston University		–		6	–	2	–	0
Dartmouth		–		6	–	2	–	1
Brown		–		5	–	3	–	1
Bucknell		–		5	–	3	–	1
Geneva		–		5	–	3	–	1
Pittsburgh		–		5	–	3	–	1
Holy Cross		–		5	–	3	–	0
Army		–		6	–	4	–	0
Princeton		–		4	–	3	–	0
Boston College		–		4	–	3	–	1
Fordham		–		4	–	3	–	2
Penn		–		4	–	3	–	2
Colgate		–		4	–	4	–	2
Lehigh		–		4	–	4	–	0
Springfield		–		4	–	5	–	2
Vermont		–		3	–	4	–	0
NYU		–		2	–	3	–	3
Buffalo		–		2	–	3	–	2
Drexel		–		2	–	3	–	1
Rutgers		–		4	–	6	–	0
Rhode Island State		–		3	–	5	–	0
Columbia		–		2	–	6	–	0
Tufts		–		1	–	5	–	2
Duquesne		–		0	–	4	–	1

The 1921 Vermont Green and Gold football team was an American football team that represented the University of Vermont as an independent during the 1921 college football season. In their first year under head coach Tom Keady, the team compiled a 3–4 record.

== Schedule ==
Date	Opponent	Site	Result	Source
October 1	at Yale	Yale Bowl; New Haven, CT	L 0–14	
October 15	at Tufts	Medford Oval; Medford, MA	W 6–0	
October 22	New Hampshire	Centennial Field; Burlington, VT	L 7–21	
October 29	Massachusetts	Alumni Field; Amherst, MA	W 14–7	
November 5	at Norwich	Sabine Field; Northfield, VT	W 14–2	
November 12	Middlebury	Centennial Field; Burlington, VT	W 14–7	
November 24	at Detroit	Navin Field; Detroit, MI	L 0–21	
