= 1921 Harvard Crimson football team =

American college football season

1921 Harvard Crimson football
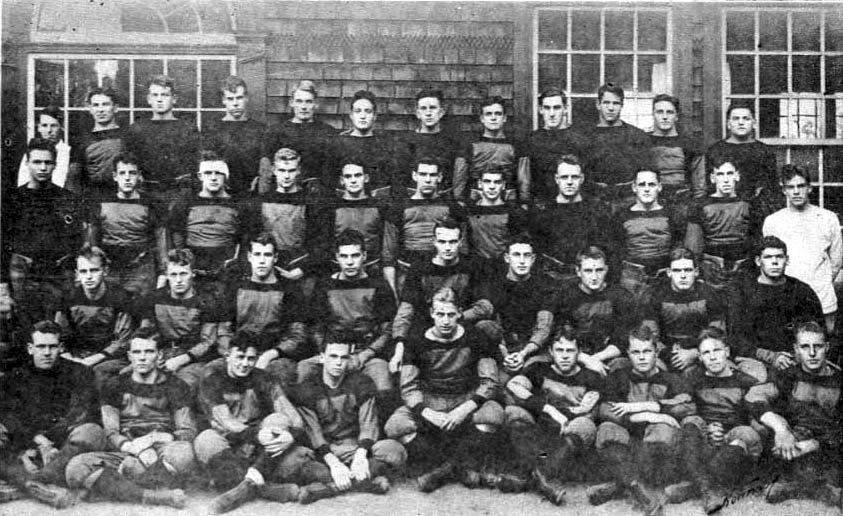
- Conference: Independent
- Record: 7–2–1
- Head coach: Bob Fisher (3rd season)
- Home stadium: Harvard Stadium

1921 Eastern college football independents records
	Conf.			Overall
Team	W	L	T	W		L		T
Washington & Jefferson		–		10	–	0	–	1
Lafayette		–		9	–	0	–	0
Cornell		–		8	–	0	–	0
Penn State		–		8	–	0	–	2
Yale		–		8	–	1	–	0
New Hampshire		–		8	–	1	–	1
Franklin & Marshall		–		6	–	1	–	2
Villanova		–		6	–	1	–	2
Carnegie Tech		–		7	–	2	–	0
Syracuse		–		7	–	2	–	0
Harvard		–		7	–	2	–	1
Boston University		–		6	–	2	–	0
Dartmouth		–		6	–	2	–	1
Brown		–		5	–	3	–	1
Bucknell		–		5	–	3	–	1
Geneva		–		5	–	3	–	1
Pittsburgh		–		5	–	3	–	1
Holy Cross		–		5	–	3	–	0
Army		–		6	–	4	–	0
Princeton		–		4	–	3	–	0
Boston College		–		4	–	3	–	1
Fordham		–		4	–	3	–	2
Penn		–		4	–	3	–	2
Colgate		–		4	–	4	–	2
Lehigh		–		4	–	4	–	0
Springfield		–		4	–	5	–	2
Vermont		–		3	–	4	–	0
NYU		–		2	–	3	–	3
Buffalo		–		2	–	3	–	2
Drexel		–		2	–	3	–	1
Rutgers		–		4	–	6	–	0
Rhode Island State		–		3	–	5	–	0
Columbia		–		2	–	6	–	0
Tufts		–		1	–	5	–	2
Duquesne		–		0	–	4	–	1

The 1921 Harvard Crimson football team represented Harvard University in the 1921 college football season. The Crimson finished with a 7–2–1 record under third-year head coach Bob Fisher. Walter Camp selected one Harvard player, guard John Fiske Brown, as a first-team member of his 1921 College Football All-America Team.

== Schedule ==
Date	Time	Opponent	Site	Result	Attendance	Source
September 24		Boston University	Harvard Stadium; Boston, MA	W 10–0	15,000	
September 24		Middlebury	Harvard Stadium; Boston, MA	W 16–0	15,000	
October 1		Holy Cross	Harvard Stadium; Boston, MA	W 3–0	30,000	
October 8		Indiana	Harvard Stadium; Boston, MA	W 19–0	15,000	
October 15		Georgia	Harvard Stadium; Boston, MA	W 10–7	25,000	
October 22		Penn State	Harvard Stadium; Boston, MA	T 21–21	30,000	
October 29		Centre	Harvard Stadium; Boston, MA	L 0–6	43,000	
November 5		at Princeton	Palmer Stadium; Princeton, NJ (rivalry)	L 3–10		
November 12	2:00 p.m.	Brown	Harvard Stadium; Boston, MA	W 9–7	25,000	
November 19		Yale	Harvard Stadium; Boston, MA (rivalry)	W 10–3		
All times are in Eastern time

== Game summaries ==
=== Game 1: Boston University ===
Boston University at Harvard

Team	1	2	3	4	Total
Boston University	0	0	0	0	0
• Harvard	7	0	3	0	10

- Date: September 24
- Location: Harvard Stadium
- Referee: O'Brien (Tufts)

Harvard began the 1921 season with a doubleheader at Harvard Stadium on September 24; both games were played with eight-minute quarters. The first game of the doubleheader was against Boston University. Harvard's team played conservatively and the line played better than was expected. With the ball on the Boston 16-yard line, they completed a forward pass and called a series of rushes which culminated in a touchdown rush by George Owen in the first quarter. Charles Buell converted the extra point to make the score 7–0. The only other scoring play in the contest was a field goal kicked from the Boston 18-yard line by Buell, which followed an 80-yard kick return by Vinton Chapin.

Harvard's season-opening starting lineup was Kunhardt at center; Kane, Hubbard, Brocker, Brown, Lockwood, and Crocker also on the line; Buell at quarterback, Fitts and Owen at halfback, and Chapin at fullback.

=== Game 2: Middlebury ===
Middlebury at Harvard

Team	1	2	3	4	Total
Middlebury	0	0	0	0	0
• Harvard	0	10	0	6	16

- Date: September 24
- Location: Harvard Stadium
- Referee: O'Brien (Tufts)

Harvard's starters for the game were Bradford at center, Hartley, Henry, Anthony, Grew, Hobson, and Macomber also on the line, Johnson at quarterback, Pfaffman and Rouillard at halfback, and Churchill at fullback.

=== Game 3: Holy Cross ===
Holy Cross at Harvard

Team	1	2	3	4	Total
Holy Cross	0	0	0	0	0
• Harvard	0	0	3	0	3

- Date: October 1
- Location: Harvard Stadium
- Game attendance: 30,000
- Referee: O'Brien (Tufts)

=== Game 4: Indiana ===
Indiana at Harvard

Team	1	2	3	4	Total
Indiana	0	0	0	0	0
• Harvard	3	10	0	6	19

- Date: October 8
- Location: Harvard Stadium
- Game attendance: 15,000
- Game weather: Rain
- Referee: Crowell (Swarthmore)

=== Game 5: Georgia ===
Georgia at Harvard

Team	1	2	3	4	Total
Georgia	0	0	0	7	7
• Harvard	7	3	0	0	10

- Date: October 15
- Location: Harvard Stadium
- Game attendance: 25,000
- Referee: Crowell (Swarthmore)

=== Game 6: Penn State ===
Penn State at Harvard

Team	1	2	3	4	Total
Penn State	0	7	7	7	21
Harvard	7	7	0	7	21

- Date: October 22
- Location: Harvard Stadium
- Referee: O'Brien (Tufts)

=== Game 7: Centre ===
Centre at Harvard, "C6H0"

Team	1	2	3	4	Total
• Centre	0	0	6	0	6
Harvard	0	0	0	0	0

- Date: October 29
- Location: Harvard Stadium
- Referee: Maxwell (Swarthmore)

=== Game 8: Princeton ===
Harvard at Princeton

Team	1	2	3	4	Total
Harvard	0	0	0	3	3
• Princeton	0	0	0	10	10

- Date: November 5
- Location: Palmer Stadium
- Referee: Crowell (Swarthmore)

=== Game 9: Brown ===
Brown at Harvard

Team	1	2	3	4	Total
Brown	0	0	0	7	7
• Harvard	0	0	3	6	9

- Date: November 12
- Location: Harvard Stadium
- Game start: 2:00 p.m.
- Game attendance: 25,000
- Referee: Crowell (Swarthmore)

=== Game 10: Yale ===
Yale at Harvard

Team	1	2	3	4	Total
Yale	3	0	0	0	3
• Harvard	0	0	0	10	10

- Date: November 19
- Location: Harvard Stadium
- Referee: Maxwell (Swarthmore)

== Personnel ==
=== Roster ===
Player	Position	Games started	Prep school	Height	Weight	Age
Line
Wesley Brocker	Guard	1	Mechanic Arts HS	6 ft 2 in (1.88 m)	205 lb (93 kg)	26
Fiske Brown	Guard	1	Andover HS	6 ft 0 in (1.83 m)	207 lb (94 kg)	21
Henry W. Clark	Center		Phillips Exeter Academy	6 ft 0 in (1.83 m)	167 lb (76 kg)	22
John Crocker	End	1	Groton School	6 ft 1 in (1.85 m)	180 lb (82 kg)	21
R. P. Field	End		St. Mark's School	5 ft 11 in (1.80 m)	175 lb (79 kg)	20
H. S. Grew	Guard		St. Mark's School	5 ft 11 in (1.80 m)	209 lb (95 kg)	20
Charles Hubbard	Tackle	1	Milton HS	6 ft 2 in (1.88 m)	190 lb (86 kg)	19
Henry Janin	End		Pomfret School	6 ft 0 in (1.83 m)	180 lb (82 kg)	21
Richmond Kane	Tackle	1	St. George's School	6 ft 1 in (1.85 m)	185 lb (84 kg)	21
Philip Kunhardt	Center	1	Groton School	6 ft 0 in (1.83 m)	190 lb (86 kg)	21
Alexander Ladd	Tackle		Milton HS	6 ft 2 in (1.88 m)	187 lb (85 kg)	19
Benoni Lockwood	Tackle	1	Groton School	6 ft 2 in (1.88 m)	190 lb (86 kg)	19
Charles Macomber	End		Newton HS	5 ft 10 in (1.78 m)	175 lb (79 kg)	21
Charles Tierney	Center		Andover HS	6 ft 2 in (1.88 m)	192 lb (87 kg)	27
Backfield
Charles Buell	Quarterback	1	Pomfret School	5 ft 9 in (1.75 m)	156 lb (71 kg)	22
Vinton Chapin	Back	1	St. Mark's School	5 ft 10 in (1.78 m)	165 lb (75 kg)	21
Winthrop Churchill	Back		Milton HS	5 ft 6 in (1.68 m)	160 lb (73 kg)	20
Philip Coburn	Back		Noble and Greenough School	5 ft 11 in (1.80 m)	185 lb (84 kg)	21
Roscoe Fitts	Back	1	Tufts University	5 ft 11 in (1.80 m)	180 lb (82 kg)	20
Erwin Gehrke	Back		Cleveland HS	5 ft 11 in (1.80 m)	182 lb (83 kg)	22
Mitchell Gratwick	Back		Andover HS	6 ft 0 in (1.83 m)	160 lb (73 kg)	21
Percy Jenkins	Back		Mercersburg Academy	5 ft 9 in (1.75 m)	165 lb (75 kg)	20
Frank Johnson	Quarterback		Gunnery School	5 ft 8 in (1.73 m)	155 lb (70 kg)	24
George Owen	Back	1	Newton HS	5 ft 11 in (1.80 m)	184 lb (83 kg)	20
Karl Pfaffman	Back		Boston College HS	6 ft 1 in (1.85 m)	160 lb (73 kg)	21

The "Games started" column is correct through Harvard's first game, against Boston University. It will be updated as more progress is made on the article's "Game summaries" section.
