= 1921 Princeton Tigers football team =

American college football season

1921 Princeton Tigers football
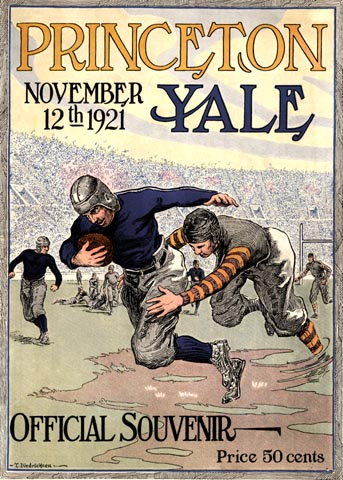
- Princeton v Yale game poster
- Conference: Independent
- Record: 4–3
- Head coach: Bill Roper (8th season)
- Offensive scheme: Short punt
- Captain: Stan Keck
- Home stadium: Palmer Stadium

Uniform
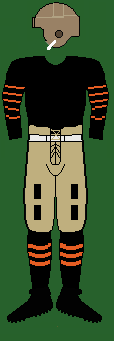

1921 Eastern college football independents records
	Conf.			Overall
Team	W	L	T	W		L		T
Washington & Jefferson		–		10	–	0	–	1
Lafayette		–		9	–	0	–	0
Cornell		–		8	–	0	–	0
Penn State		–		8	–	0	–	2
Yale		–		8	–	1	–	0
New Hampshire		–		8	–	1	–	1
Franklin & Marshall		–		6	–	1	–	2
Villanova		–		6	–	1	–	2
Carnegie Tech		–		7	–	2	–	0
Syracuse		–		7	–	2	–	0
Harvard		–		7	–	2	–	1
Boston University		–		6	–	2	–	0
Dartmouth		–		6	–	2	–	1
Brown		–		5	–	3	–	1
Bucknell		–		5	–	3	–	1
Geneva		–		5	–	3	–	1
Pittsburgh		–		5	–	3	–	1
Holy Cross		–		5	–	3	–	0
Army		–		6	–	4	–	0
Princeton		–		4	–	3	–	0
Boston College		–		4	–	3	–	1
Fordham		–		4	–	3	–	2
Penn		–		4	–	3	–	2
Colgate		–		4	–	4	–	2
Lehigh		–		4	–	4	–	0
Springfield		–		4	–	5	–	2
Vermont		–		3	–	4	–	0
NYU		–		2	–	3	–	3
Buffalo		–		2	–	3	–	2
Drexel		–		2	–	3	–	1
Rutgers		–		4	–	6	–	0
Rhode Island State		–		3	–	5	–	0
Columbia		–		2	–	6	–	0
Tufts		–		1	–	5	–	2
Duquesne		–		0	–	4	–	1

The 1921 Princeton Tigers football team represented Princeton University in the 1921 college football season. The team finished with a 4–3 record under eighth-year head coach Bill Roper. Princeton guard Stan Keck was a consensus first-team honoree on the 1921 College Football All-America Team, and two other players (center Al Wittmer and an end with the surname Sniveley) were selected as first-team All-Americans by at least one selector.

== Schedule ==
Date	Opponent	Site	Result	Source
October 1	Swarthmore	Palmer Stadium; Princeton, NJ	W 21–7	
October 8	Colgate	Palmer Stadium; Princeton, NJ	W 19–0	
October 15	at Navy	Worden Field; Annapolis, MD	L 0–13	
October 22	Chicago	Palmer Stadium; Princeton, NJ	L 0–9	
October 29	Virginia	Palmer Stadium; Princeton, NJ	W 34–0	
November 5	Harvard	Palmer Stadium; Princeton, NJ (rivalry)	W 10–3	
November 12	at Yale	Yale Bowl; New Haven, CT (rivalry)	L 7–13	
