= 1921 Springfield Red and White football team =

American college football season

1921 Springfield Red and White football
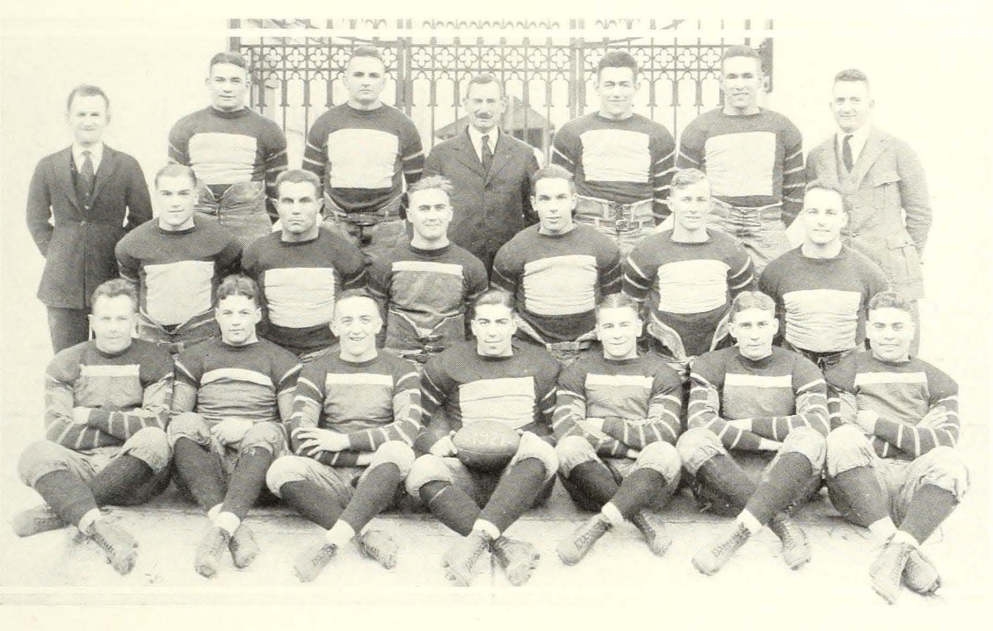
- Conference: Independent
- Record: 4–5–2
- Head coach: Elmer Berry (5th season)
- Captain: Len Watters
- Home stadium: Pratt Field

1921 Eastern college football independents records
	Conf.			Overall
Team	W	L	T	W		L		T
Washington & Jefferson		–		10	–	0	–	1
Lafayette		–		9	–	0	–	0
Cornell		–		8	–	0	–	0
Penn State		–		8	–	0	–	2
Yale		–		8	–	1	–	0
New Hampshire		–		8	–	1	–	1
Franklin & Marshall		–		6	–	1	–	2
Villanova		–		6	–	1	–	2
Carnegie Tech		–		7	–	2	–	0
Syracuse		–		7	–	2	–	0
Harvard		–		7	–	2	–	1
Boston University		–		6	–	2	–	0
Dartmouth		–		6	–	2	–	1
Brown		–		5	–	3	–	1
Bucknell		–		5	–	3	–	1
Geneva		–		5	–	3	–	1
Pittsburgh		–		5	–	3	–	1
Holy Cross		–		5	–	3	–	0
Army		–		6	–	4	–	0
Princeton		–		4	–	3	–	0
Boston College		–		4	–	3	–	1
Fordham		–		4	–	3	–	2
Penn		–		4	–	3	–	2
Colgate		–		4	–	4	–	2
Lehigh		–		4	–	4	–	0
Springfield		–		4	–	5	–	2
Vermont		–		3	–	4	–	0
NYU		–		2	–	3	–	3
Buffalo		–		2	–	3	–	2
Drexel		–		2	–	3	–	1
Rutgers		–		4	–	6	–	0
Rhode Island State		–		3	–	5	–	0
Columbia		–		2	–	6	–	0
Tufts		–		1	–	5	–	2
Duquesne		–		0	–	4	–	1

The 1921 Springfield Red and White football team was an American football team that represented Springfield College as an independent during the 1921 college football season. Led by Elmer Berry in his fifth and final season as head coach, Springfield compiled a record of 4–5–2. Len Watters was the team's captain. Springfield played home games at Pratt Field in Springfield, Massachusetts.

== Schedule ==
Date	Time	Opponent	Site	Result	Attendance	Source
September 24		Amherst	Springfield, MA	W 26–0		
October 1		at Army	The Plain; West Point, NY	L 6–28		
October 8		Colby	Pratt Field; Springfield, MA	W 13–6		
October 12		Holy Cross	Pratt Field; Springfield, MA	L 0–12	8,000	
October 15		at Stevens	Hoboken, NJ	W 34–18		
October 22		at Brown	Andrews Field; Providence, RI	T 0–0		
October 29		Niagara	Springfield, MA	W 40–0		
November 5	2:30 p.m.	at Detroit	Navin Field; Detroit, MI	L 0–21	12,000	
November 12		at Cornell	Schoellkopf Field; Ithaca, NY	L 0–14		
November 19		Fordham	Pratt Field; Springfield, MA	L 0–14	5,000	
November 24		New Hampshire	Pratt Field; Springfield, MA	T 0–0		
All times are in Eastern time
