= 1921 Army Cadets football team =

American college football season

1921 Army Cadets football
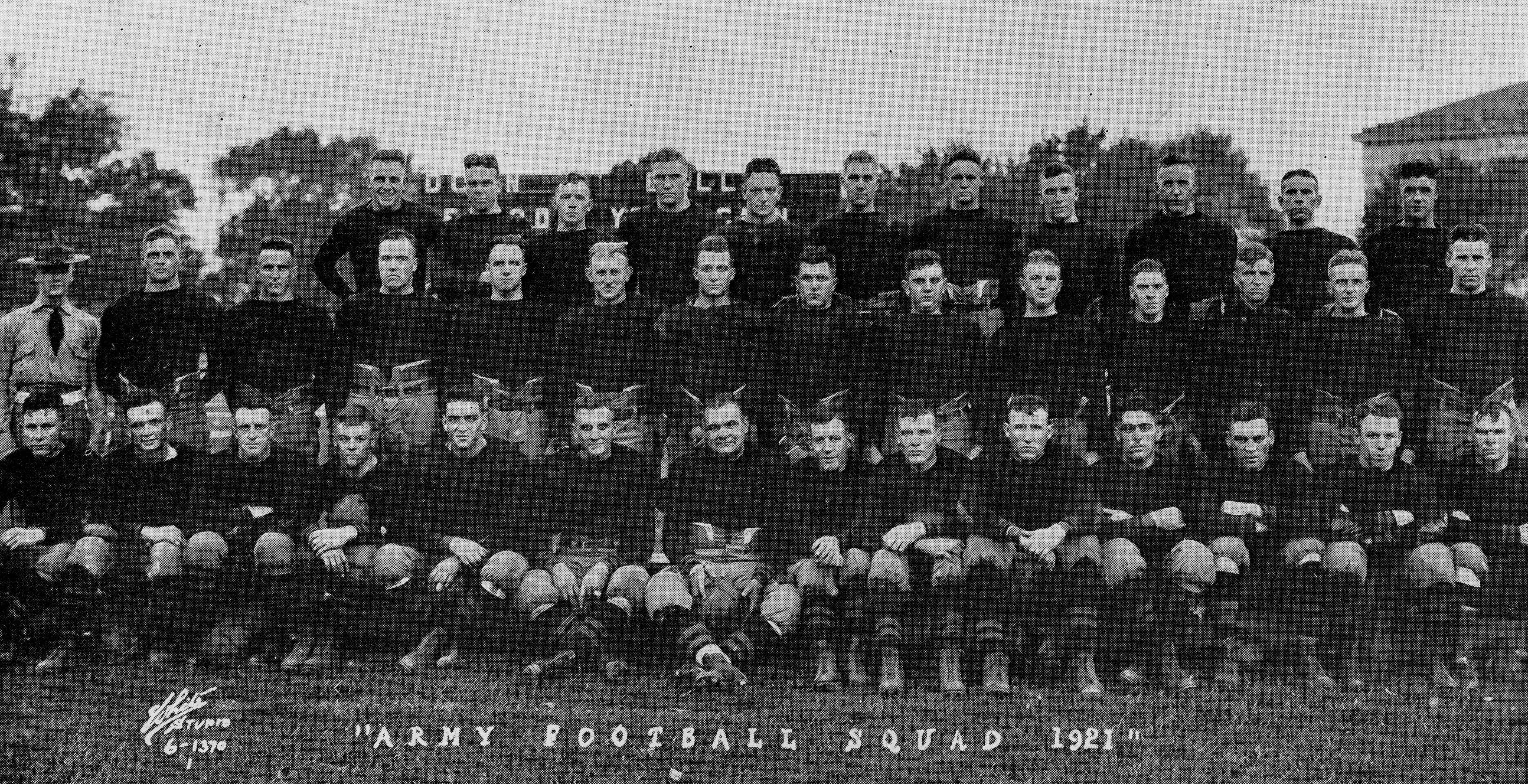
- Conference: Independent
- Record: 6–4
- Head coach: Charles Dudley Daly (7th season)
- Captain: Francis Greene
- Home stadium: The Plain

1921 Eastern college football independents records
	Conf.			Overall
Team	W	L	T	W		L		T
Washington & Jefferson		–		10	–	0	–	1
Lafayette		–		9	–	0	–	0
Cornell		–		8	–	0	–	0
Penn State		–		8	–	0	–	2
Yale		–		8	–	1	–	0
New Hampshire		–		8	–	1	–	1
Franklin & Marshall		–		6	–	1	–	2
Villanova		–		6	–	1	–	2
Carnegie Tech		–		7	–	2	–	0
Syracuse		–		7	–	2	–	0
Harvard		–		7	–	2	–	1
Boston University		–		6	–	2	–	0
Dartmouth		–		6	–	2	–	1
Brown		–		5	–	3	–	1
Bucknell		–		5	–	3	–	1
Geneva		–		5	–	3	–	1
Pittsburgh		–		5	–	3	–	1
Holy Cross		–		5	–	3	–	0
Army		–		6	–	4	–	0
Princeton		–		4	–	3	–	0
Boston College		–		4	–	3	–	1
Fordham		–		4	–	3	–	2
Penn		–		4	–	3	–	2
Colgate		–		4	–	4	–	2
Lehigh		–		4	–	4	–	0
Springfield		–		4	–	5	–	2
Vermont		–		3	–	4	–	0
NYU		–		2	–	3	–	3
Buffalo		–		2	–	3	–	2
Drexel		–		2	–	3	–	1
Rutgers		–		4	–	6	–	0
Rhode Island State		–		3	–	5	–	0
Columbia		–		2	–	6	–	0
Tufts		–		1	–	5	–	2
Duquesne		–		0	–	4	–	1

The 1921 Army Cadets football team Represented the United States Military Academy as an independent during the 1921 college football season. In their seventh season under head coach Charles Dudley Daly, the Cadets compiled a 6–4 record, shut out five of their ten opponents, and outscored all opponents by a combined total of 217 to 65 In the annual Army–Navy Game, the Cadets lost to the Midshipmen 7–0. The Cadets also lost to Yale and Notre Dame.

Three Army players were recognized on the All-America team: halfback Walter French was selected as a third-team All-American by Walter Camp, guard Fritz Breidster was selected as a third-team All-American by Jack Veiock, sports editor of the International News Service, and a center named Larsen was selected as a second-team All-American by Walter Camp and Football World.

== Schedule ==
Date	Opponent	Site	Result	Attendance	Source
October 1	Springfield	The Plain; West Point, NY	W 28–6		
October 1	New Hampshire	The Plain; West Point, NY	L 7–10		
October 8	Lebanon Valley	The Plain; West Point, NY	W 33–0		
October 8	Middlebury	The Plain; West Point, NY	W 19–0		
October 15	Wabash	The Plain; West Point, NY	W 21–0		
October 22	at Yale	Yale Bowl; New Haven, CT	L 7–14		
October 29	Susquehanna	The Plain; West Point, NY	W 53–0		
November 5	Notre Dame	The Plain; West Point, NY (rivalry)	L 0–28	7,000	
November 12	Villanova	The Plain; West Point, NY	W 49–0		
November 26	vs. Navy	Polo Grounds; New York, NY (Army–Navy Game)	L 0–7	40,000	
