= 1921 Brown Bears football team =

American college football season

1921 Brown Bears football
- Conference: Independent
- Record: 5–3–1
- Head coach: Edward N. Robinson (20th season)
- Captain: W. H. Shupert
- Home stadium: Andrews Field

1921 Eastern college football independents records
	Conf.			Overall
Team	W	L	T	W		L		T
Washington & Jefferson		–		10	–	0	–	1
Lafayette		–		9	–	0	–	0
Cornell		–		8	–	0	–	0
Penn State		–		8	–	0	–	2
Yale		–		8	–	1	–	0
New Hampshire		–		8	–	1	–	1
Franklin & Marshall		–		6	–	1	–	2
Villanova		–		6	–	1	–	2
Carnegie Tech		–		7	–	2	–	0
Syracuse		–		7	–	2	–	0
Harvard		–		7	–	2	–	1
Boston University		–		6	–	2	–	0
Dartmouth		–		6	–	2	–	1
Brown		–		5	–	3	–	1
Bucknell		–		5	–	3	–	1
Geneva		–		5	–	3	–	1
Pittsburgh		–		5	–	3	–	1
Holy Cross		–		5	–	3	–	0
Army		–		6	–	4	–	0
Princeton		–		4	–	3	–	0
Boston College		–		4	–	3	–	1
Fordham		–		4	–	3	–	2
Penn		–		4	–	3	–	2
Colgate		–		4	–	4	–	2
Lehigh		–		4	–	4	–	0
Springfield		–		4	–	5	–	2
Vermont		–		3	–	4	–	0
NYU		–		2	–	3	–	3
Buffalo		–		2	–	3	–	2
Drexel		–		2	–	3	–	1
Rutgers		–		4	–	6	–	0
Rhode Island State		–		3	–	5	–	0
Columbia		–		2	–	6	–	0
Tufts		–		1	–	5	–	2
Duquesne		–		0	–	4	–	1

The 1921 Brown Bears football team represented Brown University as an independent during the 1921 college football season. Led by 20th-year head coach Edward N. Robinson, the Bears compiled a record of 5–3–1.

== Schedule ==
Date	Time	Opponent	Site	Result	Attendance	Source
September 24		Rhode Island State	Andrews Field; Providence, RI (rivalry)	W 6–0		
October 1		Colby	Andrews Field; Providence, RI	W 12–7		
October 8		NYU	Andrews Field; Providence, RI	W 13–0		
October 15		at Syracuse	Archbold Stadium; Syracuse, NY	L 0–28	20,000	
October 22		Springfield	Andrews Field; Providence, RI	T 0–0		
October 29		at Yale	Yale Bowl; New Haven, CT	L 7–45	20,000	
November 5		St. Bonaventure	Andrews Field; Providence, RI	W 55–0		
November 12	2:00 p.m.	at Harvard	Harvard Stadium; Boston, MA	L 7–9	25,000	
November 19		Colgate	Andrews Field; Providence, RI	W 14–0		
All times are in Eastern time
