= 1921 Rutgers Queensmen football team =

1921 Rutgers University football team

1921 Rutgers Queensmen football
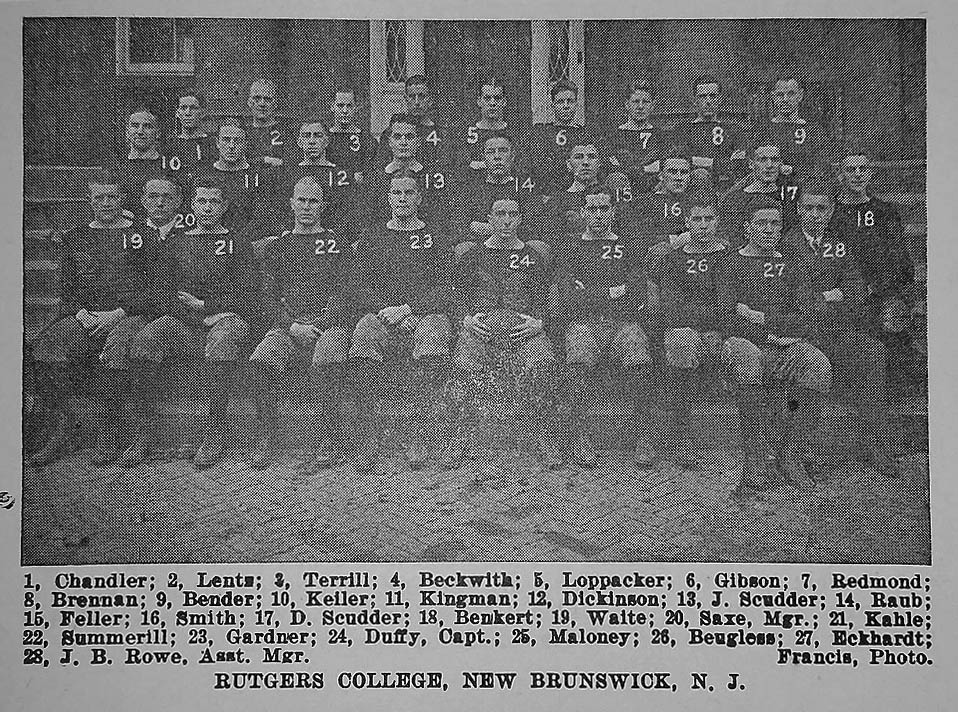
- Conference: Independent
- Record: 4–5
- Head coach: George Sanford (9th season)
- Home stadium: Neilson Field

1921 Eastern college football independents records
	Conf.			Overall
Team	W	L	T	W		L		T
Washington & Jefferson		–		10	–	0	–	1
Lafayette		–		9	–	0	–	0
Cornell		–		8	–	0	–	0
Penn State		–		8	–	0	–	2
Yale		–		8	–	1	–	0
New Hampshire		–		8	–	1	–	1
Franklin & Marshall		–		6	–	1	–	2
Villanova		–		6	–	1	–	2
Carnegie Tech		–		7	–	2	–	0
Syracuse		–		7	–	2	–	0
Harvard		–		7	–	2	–	1
Boston University		–		6	–	2	–	0
Dartmouth		–		6	–	2	–	1
Brown		–		5	–	3	–	1
Bucknell		–		5	–	3	–	1
Geneva		–		5	–	3	–	1
Pittsburgh		–		5	–	3	–	1
Holy Cross		–		5	–	3	–	0
Army		–		6	–	4	–	0
Princeton		–		4	–	3	–	0
Boston College		–		4	–	3	–	1
Fordham		–		4	–	3	–	2
Penn		–		4	–	3	–	2
Colgate		–		4	–	4	–	2
Lehigh		–		4	–	4	–	0
Springfield		–		4	–	5	–	2
Vermont		–		3	–	4	–	0
NYU		–		2	–	3	–	3
Buffalo		–		2	–	3	–	2
Drexel		–		2	–	3	–	1
Rutgers		–		4	–	6	–	0
Rhode Island State		–		3	–	5	–	0
Columbia		–		2	–	6	–	0
Tufts		–		1	–	5	–	2
Duquesne		–		0	–	4	–	1

The 1921 Rutgers Queensmen football team represented Rutgers University as an independent during the 1921 college football season. In their ninth season under head coach George Sanford, the Queensmen compiled a 4–5 record and were outscored by their opponents, 168 to 99. Sanford was inducted into the College Football Hall of Fame in 1971.

== Schedule ==
Date	Opponent	Site	Result	Attendance	Source
September 24	at Ursinus	Collegeville, PA	W 33–0		
October 1	Maryland	Neilson Field; New Brunswick, NJ	L 0–3		
October 8	Lehigh	Neilson Field; New Brunswick, NJ	L 0–7		
October 15	Washington & Lee	Neilson Field; New Brunswick, NJ	W 14–13		
October 22	at Georgia Tech	Grant Field; Atlanta, GA	L 14–48	15,000	
October 29	at Lafayette	March Field; Easton, PA	L 0–35		
November 8	vs. Notre Dame	Polo Grounds; New York, NY	L 0–48	12,000	
November 12	at NYU	Ohio Field; Bronx, NY	W 21–7		
November 19	West Virginia	Neilson Field; New Brunswick, NJ	W 17–7		
