= 1921 New Hampshire football team =

American college football season

1921 New Hampshire football
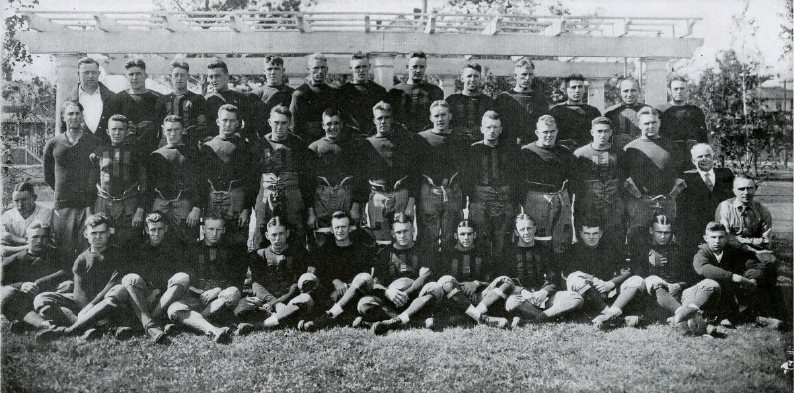
- Conference: Independent
- Record: 8–1–1
- Head coach: Butch Cowell (6th season)
- Captain: Dutch Connor
- Home stadium: Memorial Field

1921 Eastern college football independents records
	Conf.			Overall
Team	W	L	T	W		L		T
Washington & Jefferson		–		10	–	0	–	1
Lafayette		–		9	–	0	–	0
Cornell		–		8	–	0	–	0
Penn State		–		8	–	0	–	2
Yale		–		8	–	1	–	0
New Hampshire		–		8	–	1	–	1
Franklin & Marshall		–		6	–	1	–	2
Villanova		–		6	–	1	–	2
Carnegie Tech		–		7	–	2	–	0
Syracuse		–		7	–	2	–	0
Harvard		–		7	–	2	–	1
Boston University		–		6	–	2	–	0
Dartmouth		–		6	–	2	–	1
Brown		–		5	–	3	–	1
Bucknell		–		5	–	3	–	1
Geneva		–		5	–	3	–	1
Pittsburgh		–		5	–	3	–	1
Holy Cross		–		5	–	3	–	0
Army		–		6	–	4	–	0
Princeton		–		4	–	3	–	0
Boston College		–		4	–	3	–	1
Fordham		–		4	–	3	–	2
Penn		–		4	–	3	–	2
Colgate		–		4	–	4	–	2
Lehigh		–		4	–	4	–	0
Springfield		–		4	–	5	–	2
Vermont		–		3	–	4	–	0
NYU		–		2	–	3	–	3
Buffalo		–		2	–	3	–	2
Drexel		–		2	–	3	–	1
Rutgers		–		4	–	6	–	0
Rhode Island State		–		3	–	5	–	0
Columbia		–		2	–	6	–	0
Tufts		–		1	–	5	–	2
Duquesne		–		0	–	4	–	1

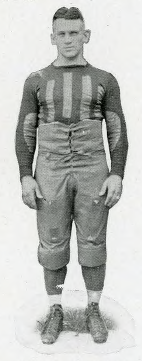
Team captain Dutch Connor c. 1921, in the annual college yearbook

The 1921 New Hampshire football team (Note: The school did not adopt the Wildcats nickname until February 1926; before then, they were generally referred to as "the blue and white".) was an American football team that represented New Hampshire College of Agriculture and the Mechanic Arts (Note: The school was often referred to as New Hampshire College or New Hampshire State College in newspapers of the era.) during the 1921 college football season—the school became the University of New Hampshire in 1923. In its sixth season under head coach William "Butch" Cowell, (Note: This was Cowell's 7th year and 6th season as head coach, as the school did not field a varsity team in 1918 due to World War I.) the team compiled an 8–1–1 record, only losing to Dartmouth, while outscoring their opponents by a total of 234 to 66.

Early in the season, the team played two "home" games in nearby Dover, New Hampshire. The first home game at Memorial Field, located in Durham, New Hampshire, was held in November; the field was used for home football games through the 1935 season. (Note: Memorial Field remains in use by the New Hampshire women's field hockey team.)

== Schedule ==
Date	Opponent	Site	Result	Attendance	Source
September 24	USMC Portsmouth	Central Park; Dover, NH	W 55–0		
October 1	at Army	The Plain; West Point, NY	W 10–7		
October 8	at Dartmouth	Alumni Oval; Hanover, NH (rivalry)	L 0–24		
October 15	Lowell Textile (Note: Lowell Textile is now University of Massachusetts Lowell.)	Central Park; Dover, NH	W 41–7		
October 22	at Vermont	Centennial Field; Burlington, VT	W 21–7		
October 29	at Bates	Lewiston, ME	W 14–0		
November 5	at Colby	Waterville, ME	W 24–7		
November 12	Massachusetts	Memorial Field; Durham, NH (rivalry)	W 56–7		
November 19	vs. Holy Cross	Textile Field; Manchester, NH	W 13–7	12,000	
November 24	at Springfield	Pratt Field; Springfield, MA	T 0–0		

Although The Granite yearbook described the September 24 contest against USMC Portsmouth as a "practice game", the result is listed by College Football Data Warehouse and the Wildcats' media guide. A newspaper article about the next season's rematch noted that the USMC team was composed of Marine Corps personnel working at the Portsmouth Naval Prison in nearby Kittery, Maine.

The 1921 game was the first meeting between the New Hampshire and Army football programs. It was one of two contests the Cadets played on October 1; before losing to New Hampshire, Army defeated Springfield College that same day.

The Dartmouth game was attended by Governor of New Hampshire Fred H. Brown, a Dartmouth graduate. Following their 1921 game, New Hampshire and Holy Cross next met in 1973. New Hampshire's 56–7 win over Massachusetts remains the largest margin of victory in what later became known as the Colonial Clash rivalry. Other than 1943 and 1945, when New Hampshire did not field teams due to World War II, 1921 remains the most recent season without a New Hampshire–Maine game.

Team captain Dutch Connor was an inaugural member of the UNH Wildcats Hall of Fame in 1982.
