= 1921 Lafayette football team =

American college football season

1921 Lafayette football
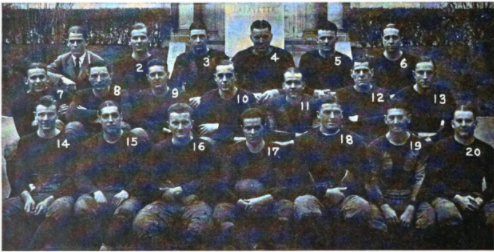

Co-national champion (Boand, Davis)
- Conference: Independent
- Record: 9–0
- Head coach: Jock Sutherland (3rd season)
- Offensive scheme: Single-wing
- Captain: Joseph Lehecka
- Home stadium: March Field

1921 Eastern college football independents records
	Conf.			Overall
Team	W	L	T	W		L		T
Washington & Jefferson		–		10	–	0	–	1
Lafayette		–		9	–	0	–	0
Cornell		–		8	–	0	–	0
Penn State		–		8	–	0	–	2
Yale		–		8	–	1	–	0
New Hampshire		–		8	–	1	–	1
Franklin & Marshall		–		6	–	1	–	2
Villanova		–		6	–	1	–	2
Carnegie Tech		–		7	–	2	–	0
Syracuse		–		7	–	2	–	0
Harvard		–		7	–	2	–	1
Boston University		–		6	–	2	–	0
Dartmouth		–		6	–	2	–	1
Brown		–		5	–	3	–	1
Bucknell		–		5	–	3	–	1
Geneva		–		5	–	3	–	1
Pittsburgh		–		5	–	3	–	1
Holy Cross		–		5	–	3	–	0
Army		–		6	–	4	–	0
Princeton		–		4	–	3	–	0
Boston College		–		4	–	3	–	1
Fordham		–		4	–	3	–	2
Penn		–		4	–	3	–	2
Colgate		–		4	–	4	–	2
Lehigh		–		4	–	4	–	0
Springfield		–		4	–	5	–	2
Vermont		–		3	–	4	–	0
NYU		–		2	–	3	–	3
Buffalo		–		2	–	3	–	2
Drexel		–		2	–	3	–	1
Rutgers		–		4	–	6	–	0
Rhode Island State		–		3	–	5	–	0
Columbia		–		2	–	6	–	0
Tufts		–		1	–	5	–	2
Duquesne		–		0	–	4	–	1

The 1921 Lafayette football team was an American football team that represented Lafayette College as an independent during the 1921 college football season. In its third season under head coach Jock Sutherland, Lafayette compiled a perfect 9–0 record, shut out five of its nine opponents, and outscored all opponents by a total of 274 to 26. Significant games included victories over Pittsburgh (6–0), Penn (38–6), and Lehigh (28–6).

There was no contemporaneous system in 1921 for determining a national champion. However, Lafayette was retroactively named as the co-national champion for 1921 by the Boand System and Parke H. Davis. Other selectors chose California, Cornell, and Iowa as the 1921 national champion.

Lafayette guard Frank Schwab was a consensus first-team selection on the 1921 All-America college football team. The team also included fullback George Seasholtz, who went on to play in the National Football League.

== Schedule ==
Date	Opponent	Site	Result	Attendance	Source
September 24	Muhlenberg	March Field; Easton, PA	W 48–0		
October 1	Pittsburgh	March Field; Easton, PA	W 6–0	15,000	
October 8	Dickinson	March Field; Easton, PA	W 27–0		
October 15	at Bucknell	Tustin Field; Lewisburg, PA	W 20–7		
October 22	at Fordham	Polo Grounds; New York, NY	W 28–7	10,000	
October 29	Rutgers	March Field; Easton, PA	W 35–0		
November 5	at Penn	Franklin Field; Philadelphia, PA	W 38–6	20,000	
November 12	Delaware	March Field; Easton, PA	W 44–0		
November 19	at Lehigh	Taylor Stadium; Bethlehem, PA (rivalry)	W 28–6	17,000	
