= 1921 Villanova Wildcats football team =

American college football season

1921 Villanova Wildcats football
- Conference: Independent
- Record: 6–1–2
- Head coach: Allie Miller (1st season)
- Captain: Joseph McCarthy

1921 Eastern college football independents records
	Conf.			Overall
Team	W	L	T	W		L		T
Washington & Jefferson		–		10	–	0	–	1
Lafayette		–		9	–	0	–	0
Cornell		–		8	–	0	–	0
Penn State		–		8	–	0	–	2
Yale		–		8	–	1	–	0
New Hampshire		–		8	–	1	–	1
Franklin & Marshall		–		6	–	1	–	2
Villanova		–		6	–	1	–	2
Carnegie Tech		–		7	–	2	–	0
Syracuse		–		7	–	2	–	0
Harvard		–		7	–	2	–	1
Boston University		–		6	–	2	–	0
Dartmouth		–		6	–	2	–	1
Brown		–		5	–	3	–	1
Bucknell		–		5	–	3	–	1
Geneva		–		5	–	3	–	1
Pittsburgh		–		5	–	3	–	1
Holy Cross		–		5	–	3	–	0
Army		–		6	–	4	–	0
Princeton		–		4	–	3	–	0
Boston College		–		4	–	3	–	1
Fordham		–		4	–	3	–	2
Penn		–		4	–	3	–	2
Colgate		–		4	–	4	–	2
Lehigh		–		4	–	4	–	0
Springfield		–		4	–	5	–	2
Vermont		–		3	–	4	–	0
NYU		–		2	–	3	–	3
Buffalo		–		2	–	3	–	2
Drexel		–		2	–	3	–	1
Rutgers		–		4	–	6	–	0
Rhode Island State		–		3	–	5	–	0
Columbia		–		2	–	6	–	0
Tufts		–		1	–	5	–	2
Duquesne		–		0	–	4	–	1

The 1921 Villanova Wildcats football team represented the Villanova University during the 1921 college football season. The Wildcats team captain was Joseph McCarthy.

== Schedule ==
Date	Opponent	Site	Result	Source
October 1	at Ursinus	Collegeville, PA	W 6–0	
October 8	at Pennsylvania Military	Chester, PA	W 19–7	
October 15	at Fordham	Fordham Field; Bronx, NY	T 20–20	
October 22	at Catholic University	Brookland Field; Washington, DC	W 7–0	
October 29	at Lebanon Valley	Norristown, PA	W 41–7	
November 5	at Gettysburg	York, PA	W 13–10	
November 12	at Army	The Plain; West Point, NY	L 0–49	
November 19	at Canisius	Buffalo, NY	T 0–0	
November 24	Mount St. Mary's	Villanova, PA	W 7–0	
