= 1921 Penn State Nittany Lions football team =

American college football season

1921 Penn State Nittany Lions football
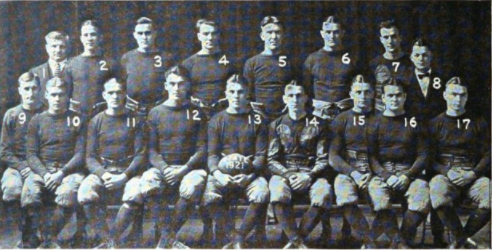
- Conference: Independent
- Record: 8–0–2
- Head coach: Hugo Bezdek (4th season)
- Captain: George Snell
- Home stadium: New Beaver Field

1921 Eastern college football independents records
	Conf.			Overall
Team	W	L	T	W		L		T
Washington & Jefferson		–		10	–	0	–	1
Lafayette		–		9	–	0	–	0
Cornell		–		8	–	0	–	0
Penn State		–		8	–	0	–	2
Yale		–		8	–	1	–	0
New Hampshire		–		8	–	1	–	1
Franklin & Marshall		–		6	–	1	–	2
Villanova		–		6	–	1	–	2
Carnegie Tech		–		7	–	2	–	0
Syracuse		–		7	–	2	–	0
Harvard		–		7	–	2	–	1
Boston University		–		6	–	2	–	0
Dartmouth		–		6	–	2	–	1
Brown		–		5	–	3	–	1
Bucknell		–		5	–	3	–	1
Geneva		–		5	–	3	–	1
Pittsburgh		–		5	–	3	–	1
Holy Cross		–		5	–	3	–	0
Army		–		6	–	4	–	0
Princeton		–		4	–	3	–	0
Boston College		–		4	–	3	–	1
Fordham		–		4	–	3	–	2
Penn		–		4	–	3	–	2
Colgate		–		4	–	4	–	2
Lehigh		–		4	–	4	–	0
Springfield		–		4	–	5	–	2
Vermont		–		3	–	4	–	0
NYU		–		2	–	3	–	3
Buffalo		–		2	–	3	–	2
Drexel		–		2	–	3	–	1
Rutgers		–		4	–	6	–	0
Rhode Island State		–		3	–	5	–	0
Columbia		–		2	–	6	–	0
Tufts		–		1	–	5	–	2
Duquesne		–		0	–	4	–	1

The 1921 Penn State Nittany Lions football team represented the Pennsylvania State College as an independent during the 1921 college football season. Known as the "Mystery Team", they were coached by Hugo Bezdek and played their home games in New Beaver Field in State College, Pennsylvania.

The Lions were again undefeated, but tied Harvard and rival Pittsburgh on the road. The season concluded in December with a long trip to Seattle and a 21–7 win over struggling Washington.

== Schedule ==
Date	Opponent	Site	Result	Attendance	Source
September 24	Lebanon Valley	New Beaver Field; State College, PA	W 53–0	2,500	
October 1	Gettysburg	New Beaver Field; State College, PA	W 24–0	2,500	
October 8	NC State	New Beaver Field; State College, PA	W 35–0	3,000	
October 15	Lehigh^{†}	New Beaver Field; State College, PA	W 28–7	4,000	
October 22	at Harvard	Harvard Stadium; Boston, MA	T 21–21	30,000	
October 29	vs. Georgia Tech	Polo Grounds; New York, NY	W 28–7	30,000	
November 5	Carnegie Tech	New Beaver Field; State College, PA	W 28–7	6,000	
November 12	vs. Navy	Franklin Field; Philadelphia, PA	W 13–7	25,000	
November 24	at Pittsburgh	Forbes Field; Pittsburgh, PA (rivalry)	T 0–0	34,000	
December 3	at Washington	University Stadium; Seattle, WA	W 21–7	13,827	
^{†}Homecoming

== Players ==
=== Line ===
Number	Player	Position	Games started	Hometown	Prep school	Height	Weight	Age
9	Ray Baer	guard		Toledo, Ohio			200	
7	Joe Bedenk	guard		Williamsport			185	
8	Newsh Bentz	center					190	
10	Hills	tackle					180	
5	Hufford	end					170	
6	McMahan	tackle					215	
11	Stan McCollum	end					178	

=== Backfield ===
Number	Player	Position	Games started	Hometown	Prep school	Height	Weight	Age
2	Glenn Killinger	quarterback		Harrisburg	Tech HS	5' 9"	160	23
25	Knabb	fullback					175	
4	Joe Lightner	halfback		Marysville			178	
15	Harry Wilson	halfback		Mingo Junction, OH		165		

=== Substitutes ===
Number	Player	Position	Games started	Hometown	Prep school	Height	Weight	Age
	Smozinski							
	Frank							
	Crowther							
	Rugh							
	Reinhard							
	Logue							
	Hamilton							
	Ritner							
	Redinger	Halfback						
	Palm							
	Cornwall							
