= 1921 Penn Quakers football team =

American college football season

1921 Penn Quakers football
- Conference: Independent
- Record: 4–3–2
- Head coach: John Heisman (2nd season)
- Captain: Rex Wray
- Home stadium: Franklin Field

1921 Eastern college football independents records
| | Conf. | | | Overall |
| Team | W | L | T | W | | L | | T |
|---|---|---|---|---|---|---|---|---|
| Washington & Jefferson | | – | | 10 | – | 0 | – | 1 |
| Lafayette | | – | | 9 | – | 0 | – | 0 |
| Cornell | | – | | 8 | – | 0 | – | 0 |
| Penn State | | – | | 8 | – | 0 | – | 2 |
| Yale | | – | | 8 | – | 1 | – | 0 |
| New Hampshire | | – | | 8 | – | 1 | – | 1 |
| Franklin & Marshall | | – | | 6 | – | 1 | – | 2 |
| Villanova | | – | | 6 | – | 1 | – | 2 |
| Carnegie Tech | | – | | 7 | – | 2 | – | 0 |
| Syracuse | | – | | 7 | – | 2 | – | 0 |
| Harvard | | – | | 7 | – | 2 | – | 1 |
| Boston University | | – | | 6 | – | 2 | – | 0 |
| Dartmouth | | – | | 6 | – | 2 | – | 1 |
| Brown | | – | | 5 | – | 3 | – | 1 |
| Bucknell | | – | | 5 | – | 3 | – | 1 |
| Geneva | | – | | 5 | – | 3 | – | 1 |
| Pittsburgh | | – | | 5 | – | 3 | – | 1 |
| Holy Cross | | – | | 5 | – | 3 | – | 0 |
| Army | | – | | 6 | – | 4 | – | 0 |
| Princeton | | – | | 4 | – | 3 | – | 0 |
| Boston College | | – | | 4 | – | 3 | – | 1 |
| Fordham | | – | | 4 | – | 3 | – | 2 |
| Penn | | – | | 4 | – | 3 | – | 2 |
| Colgate | | – | | 4 | – | 4 | – | 2 |
| Lehigh | | – | | 4 | – | 4 | – | 0 |
| Springfield | | – | | 4 | – | 5 | – | 2 |
| Vermont | | – | | 3 | – | 4 | – | 0 |
| NYU | | – | | 2 | – | 3 | – | 3 |
| Buffalo | | – | | 2 | – | 3 | – | 2 |
| Drexel | | – | | 2 | – | 3 | – | 1 |
| Rutgers | | – | | 4 | – | 6 | – | 0 |
| Rhode Island State | | – | | 3 | – | 5 | – | 0 |
| Columbia | | – | | 2 | – | 6 | – | 0 |
| Tufts | | – | | 1 | – | 5 | – | 2 |
| Duquesne | | – | | 0 | – | 4 | – | 1 |

The 1921 Penn Quakers football team was an American football team that represented the University of Pennsylvania as an independent during the 1921 college football season. In their second season under head coach John Heisman, the Quakers compiled a 4–3–2 record and outscored all opponents by a total of 164 to 135. The team played its home games at Franklin Field in Philadelphia.

== Schedule ==
| Date | Opponent | Site | Result | Attendance | Source |
|---|---|---|---|---|---|
| September 24 | Delaware | Franklin Field; Philadelphia, PA | W 89–0 | | |
| October 1 | Franklin & Marshall | Franklin Field; Philadelphia, PA | W 20–0 | | |
| October 8 | Gettysburg | Franklin Field; Philadelphia, PA | W 7–0 | | |
| October 15 | Swarthmore | Franklin Field; Philadelphia, PA | T 7–7 | | |
| October 22 | VMI | Franklin Field; Philadelphia, PA | W 21–7 | 22,000 | |
| October 29 | Pittsburgh | Franklin Field; Philadelphia, PA | L 0–28 | 30,000 | |
| November 5 | Lafayette | Franklin Field; Philadelphia, PA | L 6–38 | 20,000 | |
| November 12 | vs. Dartmouth | Polo Grounds; New York, NY | T 14–14 | | |
| November 24 | Cornell | Franklin Field; Philadelphia, PA (rivalry) | L 0–41 | 28,000 | |
