= 1921 Colgate football team =

American college football season

1921 Colgate football
- Conference: Independent
- Record: 4–4–2
- Head coach: Ellery Huntington Jr. (3rd season)
- Captain: Robert Webster
- Home stadium: Whitnall Field

1921 Eastern college football independents records
	Conf.			Overall
Team	W	L	T	W		L		T
Washington & Jefferson		–		10	–	0	–	1
Lafayette		–		9	–	0	–	0
Cornell		–		8	–	0	–	0
Penn State		–		8	–	0	–	2
Yale		–		8	–	1	–	0
New Hampshire		–		8	–	1	–	1
Franklin & Marshall		–		6	–	1	–	2
Villanova		–		6	–	1	–	2
Carnegie Tech		–		7	–	2	–	0
Syracuse		–		7	–	2	–	0
Harvard		–		7	–	2	–	1
Boston University		–		6	–	2	–	0
Dartmouth		–		6	–	2	–	1
Brown		–		5	–	3	–	1
Bucknell		–		5	–	3	–	1
Geneva		–		5	–	3	–	1
Pittsburgh		–		5	–	3	–	1
Holy Cross		–		5	–	3	–	0
Army		–		6	–	4	–	0
Princeton		–		4	–	3	–	0
Boston College		–		4	–	3	–	1
Fordham		–		4	–	3	–	2
Penn		–		4	–	3	–	2
Colgate		–		4	–	4	–	2
Lehigh		–		4	–	4	–	0
Springfield		–		4	–	5	–	2
Vermont		–		3	–	4	–	0
NYU		–		2	–	3	–	3
Buffalo		–		2	–	3	–	2
Drexel		–		2	–	3	–	1
Rutgers		–		4	–	6	–	0
Rhode Island State		–		3	–	5	–	0
Columbia		–		2	–	6	–	0
Tufts		–		1	–	5	–	2
Duquesne		–		0	–	4	–	1

The 1921 Colgate football team was an American football team that represented Colgate University as an independent during the 1921 college football season. In its third and final season under head coach Ellery Huntington Jr., the team compiled a 4–4–2 record and outscored opponents by a total of 118 to 105. Robert Webster was the team captain. The team played its home games on Whitnall Field in Hamilton, New York.

== Schedule ==
Date	Opponent	Site	Result	Attendance	Source
September 24	St. Bonaventure	Whitnall Field; Hamilton, NY	T 7–7		
October 1	Allegheny	Whitnall Field; Hamilton, NY	W 14–0		
October 8	at Princeton	Palmer Stadium; Princeton, NJ	L 0–19		
October 15	Susquehanna	Whitnall Field; Hamilton, NY	W 21–6		
October 22	at Cornell	Schoellkopf Field; Ithaca, NY (rivalry)	L 7–31	12,000	
October 29	vs. NYU	Johnson Field; Johnson City, NY	T 7–7	10,000	
November 5	Rochester	Whitnall Field; Hamilton, NY	W 41–0		
November 12	at Syracuse	Archbold Stadium; Syracuse, NY (rivalry)	L 0–14	12,000	
November 19	at Brown	Andrews Field; Providence, RI	L 0–14		
November 24	at Columbia	South Field; New York, NY	W 21–14		
