= 1921 Dartmouth Indians football team =

American college football season

1921 Dartmouth Indians football
- Conference: Independent
- Record: 6–2–1
- Head coach: Jackson Cannell (1st season)
- Captain: James Robertson

1921 Eastern college football independents records
	Conf.			Overall
Team	W	L	T	W		L		T
Washington & Jefferson		–		10	–	0	–	1
Lafayette		–		9	–	0	–	0
Cornell		–		8	–	0	–	0
Penn State		–		8	–	0	–	2
Yale		–		8	–	1	–	0
New Hampshire		–		8	–	1	–	1
Franklin & Marshall		–		6	–	1	–	2
Villanova		–		6	–	1	–	2
Carnegie Tech		–		7	–	2	–	0
Syracuse		–		7	–	2	–	0
Harvard		–		7	–	2	–	1
Boston University		–		6	–	2	–	0
Dartmouth		–		6	–	2	–	1
Brown		–		5	–	3	–	1
Bucknell		–		5	–	3	–	1
Geneva		–		5	–	3	–	1
Pittsburgh		–		5	–	3	–	1
Holy Cross		–		5	–	3	–	0
Army		–		6	–	4	–	0
Princeton		–		4	–	3	–	0
Boston College		–		4	–	3	–	1
Fordham		–		4	–	3	–	2
Penn		–		4	–	3	–	2
Colgate		–		4	–	4	–	2
Lehigh		–		4	–	4	–	0
Springfield		–		4	–	5	–	2
Vermont		–		3	–	4	–	0
NYU		–		2	–	3	–	3
Buffalo		–		2	–	3	–	2
Drexel		–		2	–	3	–	1
Rutgers		–		4	–	6	–	0
Rhode Island State		–		3	–	5	–	0
Columbia		–		2	–	6	–	0
Tufts		–		1	–	5	–	2
Duquesne		–		0	–	4	–	1

The 1921 Dartmouth Indians football team was an American football team that represented Dartmouth College as an independent during the 1921 college football season. In its first season under head coach Jackson Cannell, the team compiled a 6–2–1 record and outscored opponents by a total of 166 to 103. James Robertson was the team captain.

== Schedule ==
Date	Opponent	Site	Result	Attendance	Source
September 24	Norwich	Hanover, NH	W 34–3		
October 1	Middlebury	Hanover, NH	W 28–3		
October 8	New Hampshire	Hanover, NH (rivalry)	W 24–0		
October 15	Tennessee	Hanover, NH	W 14–3		
October 22	Columbia	Hanover, NH	W 31–7	6,000	
October 29	at Cornell	Schoellkopf Field; Ithaca, NY (rivalry)	L 7–59	13,000–14,000	
November 12	vs. Penn	Polo Grounds; New York, NY	T 14–14		
November 19	vs. Syracuse	Polo Grounds; New York, NY	L 7–14	15,000	
November 26	at Georgia	Grant Field; Atlanta, GA	W 7–0		
