= 1921 Geneva Covenanters football team =

American college football season

1921 Geneva Covenanters football
- Conference: Independent
- Record: 5–3–1
- Head coach: Philip Henry Bridenbaugh (5th season)
- Captain: Waldo S. Tippin
- Home stadium: Geneva Field

1921 Eastern college football independents records
| | Conf. | | | Overall |
| Team | W | L | T | W | | L | | T |
|---|---|---|---|---|---|---|---|---|
| Washington & Jefferson | | – | | 10 | – | 0 | – | 1 |
| Lafayette | | – | | 9 | – | 0 | – | 0 |
| Cornell | | – | | 8 | – | 0 | – | 0 |
| Penn State | | – | | 8 | – | 0 | – | 2 |
| Yale | | – | | 8 | – | 1 | – | 0 |
| New Hampshire | | – | | 8 | – | 1 | – | 1 |
| Franklin & Marshall | | – | | 6 | – | 1 | – | 2 |
| Villanova | | – | | 6 | – | 1 | – | 2 |
| Carnegie Tech | | – | | 7 | – | 2 | – | 0 |
| Syracuse | | – | | 7 | – | 2 | – | 0 |
| Harvard | | – | | 7 | – | 2 | – | 1 |
| Boston University | | – | | 6 | – | 2 | – | 0 |
| Dartmouth | | – | | 6 | – | 2 | – | 1 |
| Brown | | – | | 5 | – | 3 | – | 1 |
| Bucknell | | – | | 5 | – | 3 | – | 1 |
| Geneva | | – | | 5 | – | 3 | – | 1 |
| Pittsburgh | | – | | 5 | – | 3 | – | 1 |
| Holy Cross | | – | | 5 | – | 3 | – | 0 |
| Army | | – | | 6 | – | 4 | – | 0 |
| Princeton | | – | | 4 | – | 3 | – | 0 |
| Boston College | | – | | 4 | – | 3 | – | 1 |
| Fordham | | – | | 4 | – | 3 | – | 2 |
| Penn | | – | | 4 | – | 3 | – | 2 |
| Colgate | | – | | 4 | – | 4 | – | 2 |
| Lehigh | | – | | 4 | – | 4 | – | 0 |
| Springfield | | – | | 4 | – | 5 | – | 2 |
| Vermont | | – | | 3 | – | 4 | – | 0 |
| NYU | | – | | 2 | – | 3 | – | 3 |
| Buffalo | | – | | 2 | – | 3 | – | 2 |
| Drexel | | – | | 2 | – | 3 | – | 1 |
| Rutgers | | – | | 4 | – | 6 | – | 0 |
| Rhode Island State | | – | | 3 | – | 5 | – | 0 |
| Columbia | | – | | 2 | – | 6 | – | 0 |
| Tufts | | – | | 1 | – | 5 | – | 2 |
| Duquesne | | – | | 0 | – | 4 | – | 1 |

The 1921 Geneva Covenanters football team was an American football team that represented Geneva College as an independent during the 1921 college football season. Led by Philip Henry Bridenbaugh in his fifth and final year as head coach, the team compiled a record of 5–3–1.

== Schedule ==
| Date | Time | Opponent | Site | Result | Attendance | Source |
|---|---|---|---|---|---|---|
| September 24 | | Pittsburgh | High school field; Beaver Falls, PA | L 0–28 | | |
| October 1 | 3:00 p.m. | at Carnegie Tech | Tech Field; Pittsburgh, PA | L 0–7 | 5,000 | |
| October 8 | | at Juniata | Huntingdon, PA | W 54–0 | | |
| October 15 | | Duquesne | Beaver Falls, PA | W 9–0 | | |
| October 22 | 3:00 p.m. | Grove City | Geneva Field; Beaver Falls, PA | W 14–0 | | |
| October 29 | | at Alfred | Alfred, NY | W 21–0 | | |
| November 5 | | Hiram | Geneva Field; Beaver Falls, PA | W 1–0 (forfeit) | | |
| November 11 | | Westminster (PA) | Beaver Falls, PA | T 0–0 | | |
| November 19 | | at Allegheny | Meadville, PA | L 7–14 | | |
All times are in Eastern time
