= 1921 Boston College Eagles football team =

American college football season

1921 Boston College Eagles football
- Conference: Independent
- Record: 4–3–1
- Head coach: Frank Cavanaugh (3rd season)
- Captain: Tony Comerford
- Home stadium: Alumni Field, Braves Field

1921 Eastern college football independents records
	Conf.			Overall
Team	W	L	T	W		L		T
Washington & Jefferson		–		10	–	0	–	1
Lafayette		–		9	–	0	–	0
Cornell		–		8	–	0	–	0
Penn State		–		8	–	0	–	2
Yale		–		8	–	1	–	0
New Hampshire		–		8	–	1	–	1
Franklin & Marshall		–		6	–	1	–	2
Villanova		–		6	–	1	–	2
Carnegie Tech		–		7	–	2	–	0
Syracuse		–		7	–	2	–	0
Harvard		–		7	–	2	–	1
Boston University		–		6	–	2	–	0
Dartmouth		–		6	–	2	–	1
Brown		–		5	–	3	–	1
Bucknell		–		5	–	3	–	1
Geneva		–		5	–	3	–	1
Pittsburgh		–		5	–	3	–	1
Holy Cross		–		5	–	3	–	0
Army		–		6	–	4	–	0
Princeton		–		4	–	3	–	0
Boston College		–		4	–	3	–	1
Fordham		–		4	–	3	–	2
Penn		–		4	–	3	–	2
Colgate		–		4	–	4	–	2
Lehigh		–		4	–	4	–	0
Springfield		–		4	–	5	–	2
Vermont		–		3	–	4	–	0
NYU		–		2	–	3	–	3
Buffalo		–		2	–	3	–	2
Drexel		–		2	–	3	–	1
Rutgers		–		4	–	6	–	0
Rhode Island State		–		3	–	5	–	0
Columbia		–		2	–	6	–	0
Tufts		–		1	–	5	–	2
Duquesne		–		0	–	4	–	1

The 1921 Boston College Eagles football team represented Boston College, an independent, during the 1921 college football season. Led by third-year head coach Frank Cavanaugh, Boston College compiled a record of 4–3–1.

== Schedule ==
Date	Time	Opponent	Site	Result	Attendance	Source
October 1	3:00 p.m.	Boston University	Alumni Field; Chestnut Hill, MA (rivalry)	W 13–0		
October 8	3:00 p.m.	Providence College	Alumni Field; Chestnut Hill, MA	W 25–0		
October 15		at Baylor	State Fair of Texas; Dallas, TX	W 23–7		
October 22		Detroit	Braves Field; Boston, MA	L 0–28		
October 29		at Fordham	Ebbets Field; Brooklyn, NY	T 0–0	5,000	
November 5	2:00 p.m.	Marietta	Braves Field; Boston, MA	W 14–0		
November 19	2:00 p.m.	Georgetown	Braves Field; Boston, MA	L 10–14	20,000	
November 26	2:00 p.m.	Holy Cross	Braves Field; Boston, MA (rivalry)	L 0–41		
All times are in Eastern time
