= 1921 Drexel Dragons football team =

American college football season

1921 Drexel Dragons football
- Conference: Independent
- Record: 2–3–1
- Head coach: William McAvoy (2nd season)
- Captain: George Crichton

1921 Eastern college football independents records
	Conf.			Overall
Team	W	L	T	W		L		T
Washington & Jefferson		–		10	–	0	–	1
Lafayette		–		9	–	0	–	0
Cornell		–		8	–	0	–	0
Penn State		–		8	–	0	–	2
Yale		–		8	–	1	–	0
New Hampshire		–		8	–	1	–	1
Franklin & Marshall		–		6	–	1	–	2
Villanova		–		6	–	1	–	2
Carnegie Tech		–		7	–	2	–	0
Syracuse		–		7	–	2	–	0
Harvard		–		7	–	2	–	1
Boston University		–		6	–	2	–	0
Dartmouth		–		6	–	2	–	1
Brown		–		5	–	3	–	1
Bucknell		–		5	–	3	–	1
Geneva		–		5	–	3	–	1
Pittsburgh		–		5	–	3	–	1
Holy Cross		–		5	–	3	–	0
Army		–		6	–	4	–	0
Princeton		–		4	–	3	–	0
Boston College		–		4	–	3	–	1
Fordham		–		4	–	3	–	2
Penn		–		4	–	3	–	2
Colgate		–		4	–	4	–	2
Lehigh		–		4	–	4	–	0
Springfield		–		4	–	5	–	2
Vermont		–		3	–	4	–	0
NYU		–		2	–	3	–	3
Buffalo		–		2	–	3	–	2
Drexel		–		2	–	3	–	1
Rutgers		–		4	–	6	–	0
Rhode Island State		–		3	–	5	–	0
Columbia		–		2	–	6	–	0
Tufts		–		1	–	5	–	2
Duquesne		–		0	–	4	–	1

The 1921 Drexel Dragons football team represented Drexel Institute—now known as Drexel University—in the 1921 college football season. Led by William McAvoy in his second and final season as head coach, the team compiled a record of 2–3–1.

== Schedule ==
Date	Opponent	Site	Result	Source
October 15	Juniata	Philadelphia, PA	W 13–0	
October 22	George Washington	Strawbridge and Clothier Field; Philadelphia, PA	L 0–40	
October 29	St. John's (MD)	Philadelphia, PA	L 0–35	
November 5	New York Aggies	Philadelphia, PA	W 34–7	
November 12	at Western Maryland	Westminster, MD	L 0–14	
November 19	Gallaudet	Philadelphia, PA	T 14–14	

== Roster ==
1921 Drexel Dragons football team roster
Players
Coaches
Offense

Pos.	#	Name	Class
[[American football positions|]]		Reed
[[American football positions|]]		Valencia
[[American football positions|]]		Easterbrook
[[American football positions|]]		Ross
[[American football positions|]]		Gillette
[[American football positions|]]		Fialkowski
[[American football positions|]]		Ryan
[[American football positions|]]		Shelley
[[American football positions|]]		Hafleigh
[[American football positions|]]		Wilson
[[American football positions|]]		Layer
[[American football positions|]]		Diggins
[[American football positions|]]		Sellers
[[American football positions|]]		MacQuarrie
[[American football positions|]]		Buckman
[[American football positions|]]		H. Miller
[[American football positions|]]		Belcher
FB		George Crichton (C)
[[American football positions|]]		Greenwood
[[American football positions|]]		Mosteller
[[American football positions|]]		Connel
[[American football positions|]]		Mackin
[[American football positions|]]		W. Miller
[[American football positions|]]		Weinberger

Defense

Pos.	#	Name	Class

Special teams

Pos.	#	Name	Class

Head coach

- William McAvoy (Lafayette)

Coordinators/assistant coaches

- E.J. Hall

Legend

- (C) Team captain
- (S) Suspended
- (I) Ineligible
- Injured
- Redshirt
