= 1921 Rhode Island State football team =

American college football season

1921 Rhode Island State football
- Conference: Independent
- Record: 3–5
- Head coach: Frank Keaney (2nd season)

1921 Eastern college football independents records
	Conf.			Overall
Team	W	L	T	W		L		T
Washington & Jefferson		–		10	–	0	–	1
Lafayette		–		9	–	0	–	0
Cornell		–		8	–	0	–	0
Penn State		–		8	–	0	–	2
Yale		–		8	–	1	–	0
New Hampshire		–		8	–	1	–	1
Franklin & Marshall		–		6	–	1	–	2
Villanova		–		6	–	1	–	2
Carnegie Tech		–		7	–	2	–	0
Syracuse		–		7	–	2	–	0
Harvard		–		7	–	2	–	1
Boston University		–		6	–	2	–	0
Dartmouth		–		6	–	2	–	1
Brown		–		5	–	3	–	1
Bucknell		–		5	–	3	–	1
Geneva		–		5	–	3	–	1
Pittsburgh		–		5	–	3	–	1
Holy Cross		–		5	–	3	–	0
Army		–		6	–	4	–	0
Princeton		–		4	–	3	–	0
Boston College		–		4	–	3	–	1
Fordham		–		4	–	3	–	2
Penn		–		4	–	3	–	2
Colgate		–		4	–	4	–	2
Lehigh		–		4	–	4	–	0
Springfield		–		4	–	5	–	2
Vermont		–		3	–	4	–	0
NYU		–		2	–	3	–	3
Buffalo		–		2	–	3	–	2
Drexel		–		2	–	3	–	1
Rutgers		–		4	–	6	–	0
Rhode Island State		–		3	–	5	–	0
Columbia		–		2	–	6	–	0
Tufts		–		1	–	5	–	2
Duquesne		–		0	–	4	–	1

The 1921 Rhode Island football team was an American football team that represented Rhode Island State College (later renamed the University of Rhode Island) as an independent during the 1921 college football season. In its second season under head coach Frank Keaney, the team compiled a 3–5 record.

== Schedule ==
Date	Opponent	Site	Result	Source
September 17	at New London Sub Base		L 0–13	
September 24	at Brown	Providence, RI (rivalry)	L 0–6	
October 1	at Bowdoin	Brunswick, ME	L 0–9	
October 15	at Maine	Orono, ME	L 3–7	
October 22	at Worcester Tech	Worcester, MA	W 27–0	
October 29	at Boston University	Braves Field; Boston, MA	L 0–14	
November 5	Massachusetts	Kingston, RI	W 7–2	
November 12	at Bates		Cancelled due to snow	
November 19	Connecticut	Kingston, RI (rivalry)	W 27–21	
