= 1921 Buffalo Bisons football team =

American college football season

1921 Buffalo Bisons football
- Conference: Independent
- Record: 2–3–2
- Head coach: Art Powell (6th season)
- Captain: Herb Helwig
- Home stadium: Rotary Field

1921 Eastern college football independents records
	Conf.			Overall
Team	W	L	T	W		L		T
Washington & Jefferson		–		10	–	0	–	1
Lafayette		–		9	–	0	–	0
Cornell		–		8	–	0	–	0
Penn State		–		8	–	0	–	2
Yale		–		8	–	1	–	0
New Hampshire		–		8	–	1	–	1
Franklin & Marshall		–		6	–	1	–	2
Villanova		–		6	–	1	–	2
Carnegie Tech		–		7	–	2	–	0
Syracuse		–		7	–	2	–	0
Harvard		–		7	–	2	–	1
Boston University		–		6	–	2	–	0
Dartmouth		–		6	–	2	–	1
Brown		–		5	–	3	–	1
Bucknell		–		5	–	3	–	1
Geneva		–		5	–	3	–	1
Pittsburgh		–		5	–	3	–	1
Holy Cross		–		5	–	3	–	0
Army		–		6	–	4	–	0
Princeton		–		4	–	3	–	0
Boston College		–		4	–	3	–	1
Fordham		–		4	–	3	–	2
Penn		–		4	–	3	–	2
Colgate		–		4	–	4	–	2
Lehigh		–		4	–	4	–	0
Springfield		–		4	–	5	–	2
Vermont		–		3	–	4	–	0
NYU		–		2	–	3	–	3
Buffalo		–		2	–	3	–	2
Drexel		–		2	–	3	–	1
Rutgers		–		4	–	6	–	0
Rhode Island State		–		3	–	5	–	0
Columbia		–		2	–	6	–	0
Tufts		–		1	–	5	–	2
Duquesne		–		0	–	4	–	1

The 1921 Buffalo Bisons football team represented the University of Buffalo as an independent during the 1921 college football season. Led by Art Powell in his sixth season as head coach, the team compiled a record of 2–3–2.

== Schedule ==
Date	Time	Opponent	Site	Result	Attendance	Source
October 8	3:00 p.m.	Thiel	Rotary Field; Buffalo, NY	T 0–0		
October 15	3:00 p.m.	vs. Bethany (WV)	High School field; Wheeling, WV	L 0–42		
October 22	3:00 p.m.	Alfred	Rotary Field; Buffalo, NY	W 14–2		
October 29	2:30 p.m.	St. Stephen's	Rotary Field; Buffalo, NY	W 52–0		
November 5		vs. Allegheny	Athletic Field; Erie, PA	L 13–26	1,500	
November 12		at Hobart	Boswell Field; Geneva, NY	L 0–35		
November 19	2:30 p.m.	RPI	Rotary Field; Buffalo, NY	T 0–0		
All times are in Eastern time
