= 1921 Columbia Lions football team =

American college football season

1921 Columbia Lions football
- Conference: Independent
- Record: 2–6
- Head coach: Frank "Buck" O'Neill (2nd season)
- Captain: Francis Kessler Scovil
- Home stadium: South Field, Polo Grounds

1921 Eastern college football independents records
	Conf.			Overall
Team	W	L	T	W		L		T
Washington & Jefferson		–		10	–	0	–	1
Lafayette		–		9	–	0	–	0
Cornell		–		8	–	0	–	0
Penn State		–		8	–	0	–	2
Yale		–		8	–	1	–	0
New Hampshire		–		8	–	1	–	1
Franklin & Marshall		–		6	–	1	–	2
Villanova		–		6	–	1	–	2
Carnegie Tech		–		7	–	2	–	0
Syracuse		–		7	–	2	–	0
Harvard		–		7	–	2	–	1
Boston University		–		6	–	2	–	0
Dartmouth		–		6	–	2	–	1
Brown		–		5	–	3	–	1
Bucknell		–		5	–	3	–	1
Geneva		–		5	–	3	–	1
Pittsburgh		–		5	–	3	–	1
Holy Cross		–		5	–	3	–	0
Army		–		6	–	4	–	0
Princeton		–		4	–	3	–	0
Boston College		–		4	–	3	–	1
Fordham		–		4	–	3	–	2
Penn		–		4	–	3	–	2
Colgate		–		4	–	4	–	2
Lehigh		–		4	–	4	–	0
Springfield		–		4	–	5	–	2
Vermont		–		3	–	4	–	0
NYU		–		2	–	3	–	3
Buffalo		–		2	–	3	–	2
Drexel		–		2	–	3	–	1
Rutgers		–		4	–	6	–	0
Rhode Island State		–		3	–	5	–	0
Columbia		–		2	–	6	–	0
Tufts		–		1	–	5	–	2
Duquesne		–		0	–	4	–	1

The 1921 Columbia Lions football team was an American football team that represented Columbia University as an independent during the 1918 college football season. In his second season, head coach Frank "Buck" O'Neill led the team to a 2–6 record, with the Lions outscored 148 to 82 by opponents.

The team played most of its home games on South Field, part of the university's campus in Morningside Heights in Upper Manhattan.

== Schedule ==
Date	Opponent	Site	Result	Attendance	Source
October 1	Amherst	South Field; New York, NY	L 7–9	5,000	
October 8	Wesleyan	South Field; New York, NY	W 14–3		
October 15	NYU	South Field; New York, NY	W 19–0	12,000	
October 22	at Dartmouth	Hanover, NH	L 7–31	6,000	
October 29	Williams	South Field; New York, NY	L 0–20		
November 5	Cornell	Polo Grounds; New York, NY (rivalry)	L 7–41	20,000	
November 12	Ohio	South Field; New York, NY	L 21–23		
November 24	Colgate	South Field; New York, NY	L 14–21		

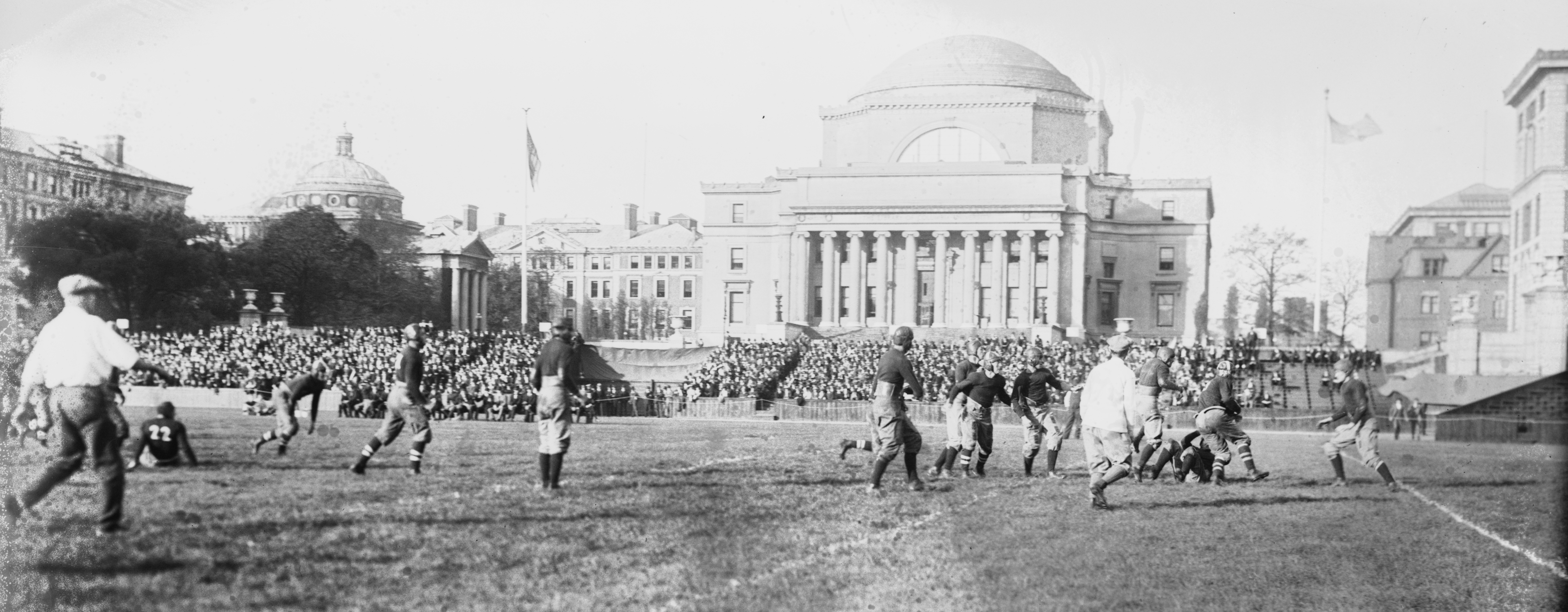
Amherst College at Columbia University football (October 1, 1921)
