= Mac Aldrich =

American football player (1900–1986)

Yale Bulldogs
- Position: Halfback

Personal information
- Born: October 1, 1900; Fall River, Massachusetts, U.S.
- Died: July 31, 1986 (aged 85); Southampton, New York, U.S.
- Listed height: 5 ft 11 in (1.80 m)
- Listed weight: 165 lb (75 kg)

Career information
- College: Yale (1919–1921)

Awards and highlights
- Consensus All-American (1921)
- College Football Hall of Fame

Malcolm Pratt "Mac" Aldrich (October 1, 1900 – July 31, 1986) was an American football player for the Yale Bulldogs football team of Yale University from 1919 to 1921. He was recognized as a consensus first-team All-American at the halfback position in 1921. Aldrich was inducted into the College Football Hall of Fame in 1972. He died July 31, 1986, at age 85.

== Yale ==
Aldrich was the Yale Bulldogs' senior team captain in 1921, and excelled as a runner and passer. He drop-kicked a 48-yard field goal against Brown, and defeated the Princeton Tigers 13-7 by kicking two fourth-quarter field goals. He scored 86 points on the season, making him the nation's third leading scorer in 1921.

Aldrich was also the Yale Bulldogs baseball captain. He played catcher.

== Commonwealth Fund ==
After graduating from Yale in 1922, he joined the Commonwealth Fund, which donated money for medical education. He became the Fund president in 1940, chairman in 1963, and received an award for distinguished service from the American Medical Association. His older brother, banking executive Hulbert Aldrich, succeeded him as president of the Commonwealth Fund.

== World War II ==
Aldrich served in the U.S. Navy during World War II.
