= Rochester–Monaca Bridge =

Bridge in Beaver County, Pennsylvania, US

Rochester–Monaca Bridge Monaca–Rochester Bridge
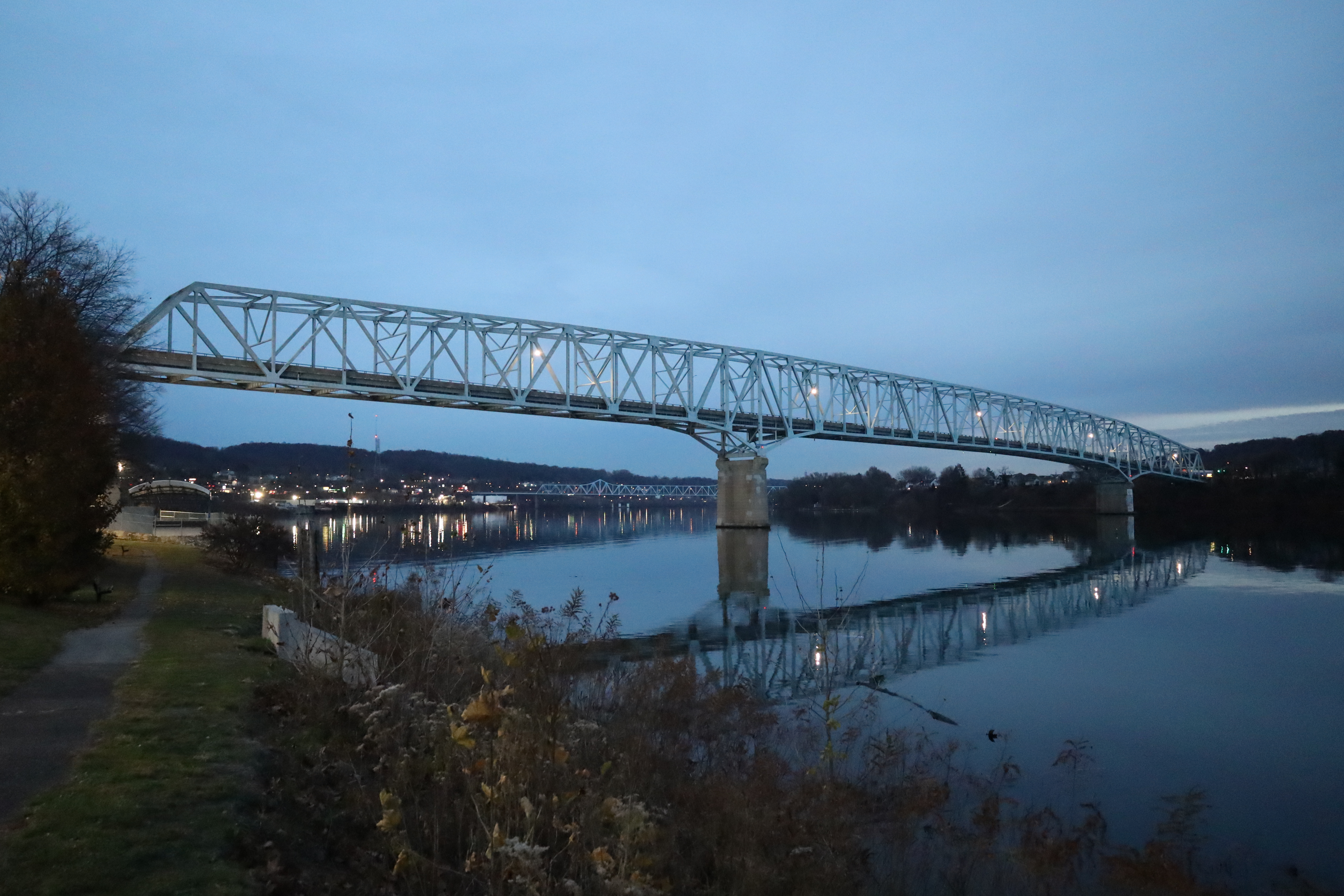
- The bridge in 2025
- Coordinates: 40.6965°N 80.2825°W
- Carries: 2 lanes of PA 18 / BicyclePA Route A
- Crosses: Ohio River
- Locale: Monaca, Pennsylvania, Rochester, Pennsylvania

Characteristics
- Design: Steel continuous truss bridge
- Longest span: 780 feet (240 m)
- Clearance below: 69 feet (21 m)

History
- Opened: 1896, 1930, 1986

Location
- Interactive map of Rochester–Monaca Bridge; Monaca–Rochester Bridge

The Rochester–Monaca Bridge/Monaca–Rochester Bridge is a steel through continuous truss bridge which crosses the Ohio River between Monaca, Pennsylvania and Rochester, Pennsylvania.

== Previous bridges ==
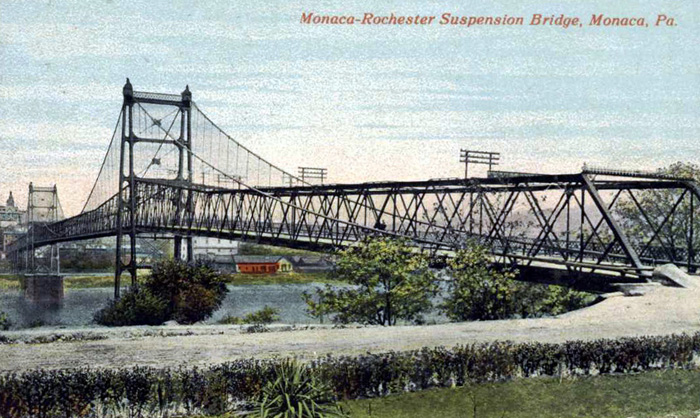
1914 postcard photo of the original Monaca–Rochester suspension bridge

The original bridge on the site was a suspension bridge built in 1896. It was replaced by a 1930 steel-truss cantilever bridge.

== Current bridge ==
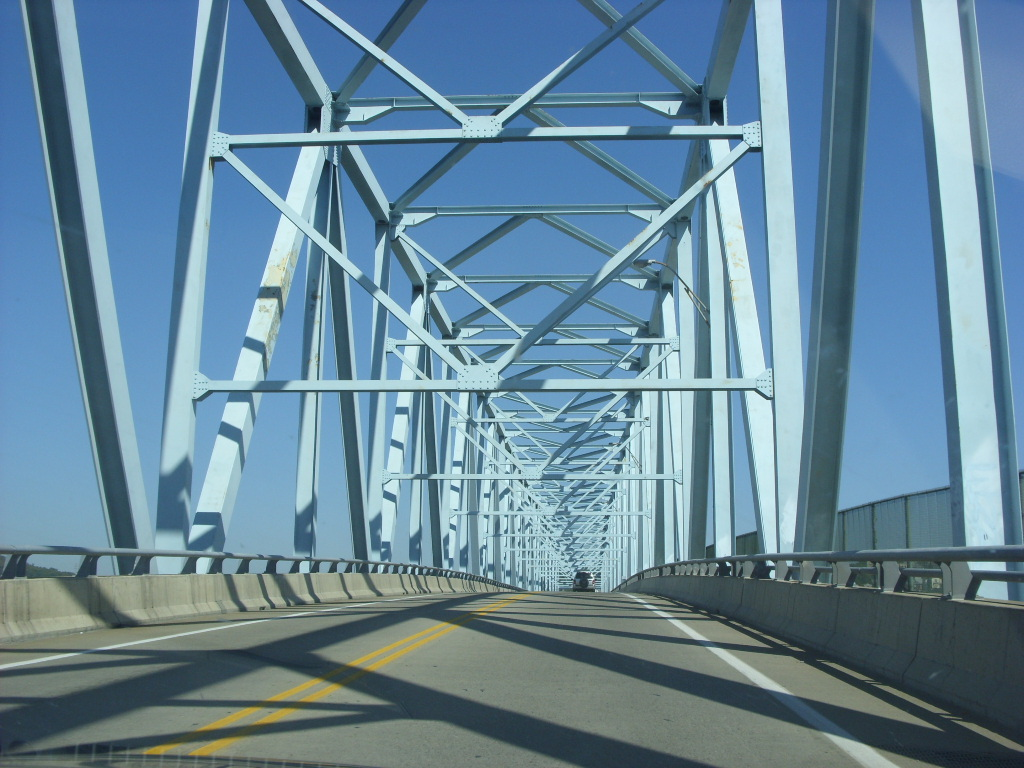
Deck of the current bridge in 2008

The current bridge opened in 1986.

From 1987 to 2009, the bridge was named each year in honor of the winner of the Rochester vs. Monaca high school football game. In 1988, the Rochester Manager Ed Piroli and Monaca Manager Tom Stoner made a bet signed with a handshake that gave the naming rights of the bridge to the winning team of that year. With Monaca High School's merger into Central Valley High School, the 2009 game was the final game to determine naming rights. with the bridge became known as the Rochester–Monaca Bridge through the end of that school year. Since then, it has been called the Rochester–Monaca Bridge on the Rochester side, and the Monaca–Rochester Bridge on the Monaca side.

Both towns' police departments respond to incidents on the bridge, with the incident location on the bridge deciding which town takes charge of incident.

== See also ==
- List of crossings of the Ohio River
