= Monaca, Pennsylvania =

Borough in Pennsylvania, United States

- Borough
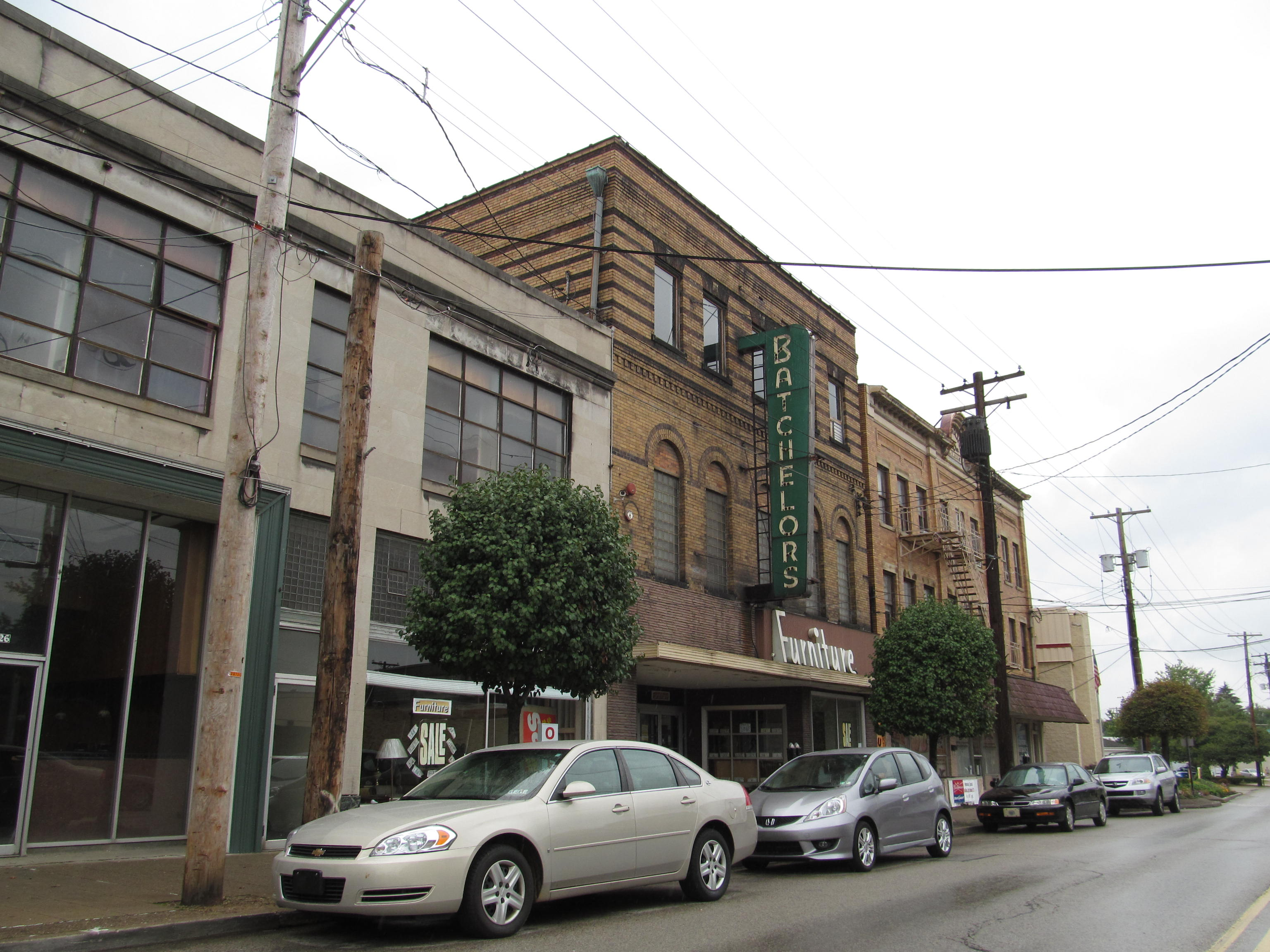
- Downtown Monaca

- Flag
- Motto: "Leading the Way in Beaver County"
- Interactive map of Monaca, Pennsylvania
- Location within Pennsylvania Location within the United States
- Coordinates: 40°41′02″N 80°16′37″W
- Country: United States
- State: Pennsylvania
- County: Beaver
- Settled: 1787
- Incorporated: 1840
- Named for: Monacatootha

Government
  - Type: Mayor-council
  - Mayor: John P. Antoline
  - Council President: John Booher, Jr.

Area
  - Total: 2.38 sq mi (6.17 km^{2})
  - Land: 2.03 sq mi (5.25 km^{2})
  - Water: 0.36 sq mi (0.92 km^{2})
- Elevation: 938 ft (286 m)

Population (2020)
  - Total: 5,625
  - Density: 2,775.0/sq mi (1,071.43/km^{2})
- Time zone: UTC-5 (Eastern (EST))
  - Summer (DST): UTC-4 (EDT)
- Zip Code: 15061
- Area code: 724
- FIPS code: 42-50320
- Website: www.monacapa.net

Monaca (/mɪˈnækə/ mi-NAK-ə) is a borough in Beaver County, Pennsylvania, United States, along the Ohio River. The population was 5,625 as of the 2020 census. It is located 25 miles (40 km) northwest of Pittsburgh and is part of the Pittsburgh metropolitan area.

First incorporated in 1840 as Phillipsburg as the home of the New Philadelphia Society, its name was changed to Monaca in honor of the Oneida leader Monacatootha. Fire clay is found in large quantities in the vicinity, and there is a Stölzle Glass plant in the town.

== History ==
=== Early settlements ===
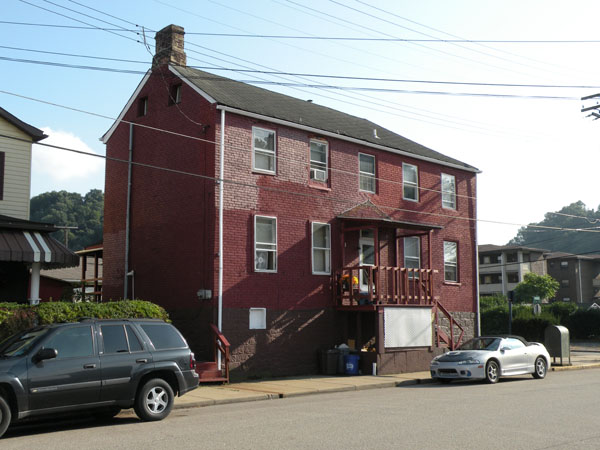
Bernhard Müller house in Monaca

Monaca has a history dating to the 18th century. The land on which it stands was granted by the Commonwealth of Pennsylvania by patent, bearing the date September 5, 1787, to Colonel Ephraim Blaine (1741–1804), who served in the Continental Army during the Revolutionary War, was commissary-general of the Northern Department from 1778 to 1782, and was James G. Blaine's great-grandfather. In the patent, this tract was called "Appetite". On August 1, 1813, the land was bought by Francis Helvidi (or Helveti, Helvedi, Helvety), described as a Polish nobleman exiled from his native country who immigrated to America. Helvidi, who may have been the first white settler in Monaca, bought the large "Appetite" tract and raised sheep on it, but his venture was unsuccessful. Harmony Society leader George Rapp, one of Helvidi's creditors, complained in 1815 "about the risk Helvidi is taking with the sheep," and in 1821, the property was sold at sheriff's sale to Rapp.

In 1822, the beginnings of a town appeared when Stephen Phillips and John Graham purchased the property and established their "extensive boat yards" on the Ohio River there. It was first named for Phillips, and was long known as Phillipsburg. Phillips and Graham built numerous steamboats, including the William Penn, which carried the Harmonites from their second settlement in New Harmony, Indiana, to Beaver County and their third and final home at Economy. In 1832, Phillips and Graham sold the entire tract of land to seceders from the Harmony Society at Economy, and moved their boatyards to what is now Freedom. The seceders from the Harmony Society were led by Bernhard Müller, known as Count de Leon. The group consisted of German immigrants who formed a communal religious society. In 1832, after leaving Economy with about 250 former Harmony Society members, Müller and his followers started a new community in Phillipsburg (now Monaca) with the money they obtained in the settlement with the Harmony Society. There they established the New Philadelphian Congregation, or New Philadelphia Society, constructing a church, a hotel, and other buildings. They soon renamed this community "Löwenburg" (Lion City). Perhaps because of ongoing litigation and other financial problems, Müller's group sold its communal land in Pennsylvania in 1833. Some community members stayed in Monaca, while others followed Müller and his family down the Ohio River on a flatboat. A number of those who followed Müller and his family ended up at the Germantown Colony near Minden, Louisiana. But many stayed in Monaca, and not long after Müller and his followers left, a new religious speaker, William Keil, showed up in the area in the early 1840s. Keil was able to attract some followers who were former Harmony Society/New Philadelphia Society members, and his group eventually moved away and settled the communal town of Bethel, Missouri, in 1844, and Aurora, Oregon, in 1856. But even still, a number of former Harmony Society/New Philadelphia Society members stayed in Monaca. In 1840, the area was incorporated as the "Borough of Phillipsburg" from the Moon Township site. The first burgess was Frederick Charles Speyerer, and the first council Edward Acker, Jacob Schaffer, Henry Jung, George Forstner, and Adam Schule.

=== Mid- to late 1800s ===
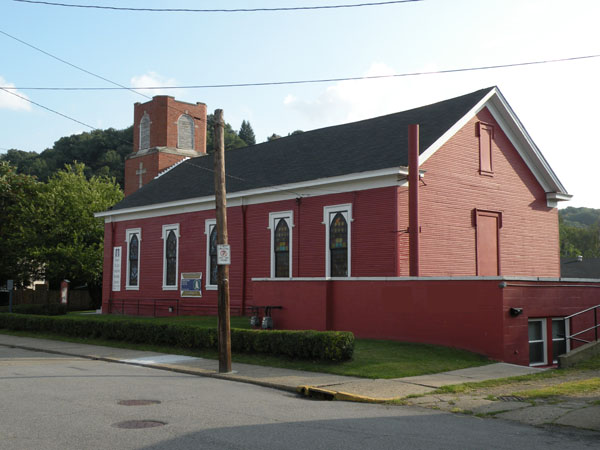
New Philadelphia Society Church, erected 1832.

Edward Acker established a "Watercure Sanatorium" in Phillipsburg in 1848, and in 1856 when the borough's first post office was established, it took the name "Water Cure". In 1865, Reverend William G. Taylor bought the Sanatorium buildings for his Soldiers' Orphans Home. The Home, according to one of the students, consisted of a "dormitory, dining room, schoolhouse, bathhouse, woodshed, carpenter shop and a two-acre playground." It burned in 1876. There is a historical marker near the point where Fourth Street meets Route 18 that reads: "Water Cure Sanatorium founded 1848 by Dr. Edward Acker. Used hydropathy or water to heal. First hospital in Beaver County. Town's first post office, 1856. Phillipsburg Soldiers Orphans School founded 1866 by Rev. William Taylor. Destroyed by fire 1876. Beaver County Historical Research & Landmarks Foundation".

Thiel College was founded in Monaca in 1866, and moved to Greenville five years later. A historical marker on Fourth Street reads: "Site of Thiel College endowed by A. Louis Thiel and founded in 1866 as Thiel Hall by Rev. William Passavant. Chartered in 1870 as Thiel College of The Evangelical Lutheran Church with Rev. Henry W. Roth as first president. Moved to Greenville, Pennsylvania, 1871. Beaver County Historical Research & Landmarks Foundation".

In 1892, the borough's name was changed from Phillipsburg to Monaca in honor of the Native American Indian Monacatootha (also known as Scarouady). Monacatootha ("Great Arrow") was an Oneida warrior chief and a representative of the Iroquois Confederacy with the authority to supervise affairs among the Delawares and Shawnees in that area. He had met with future U.S. President George Washington in Logstown. He was a strong friend of the English and campaigned against the French.

=== Modern era ===
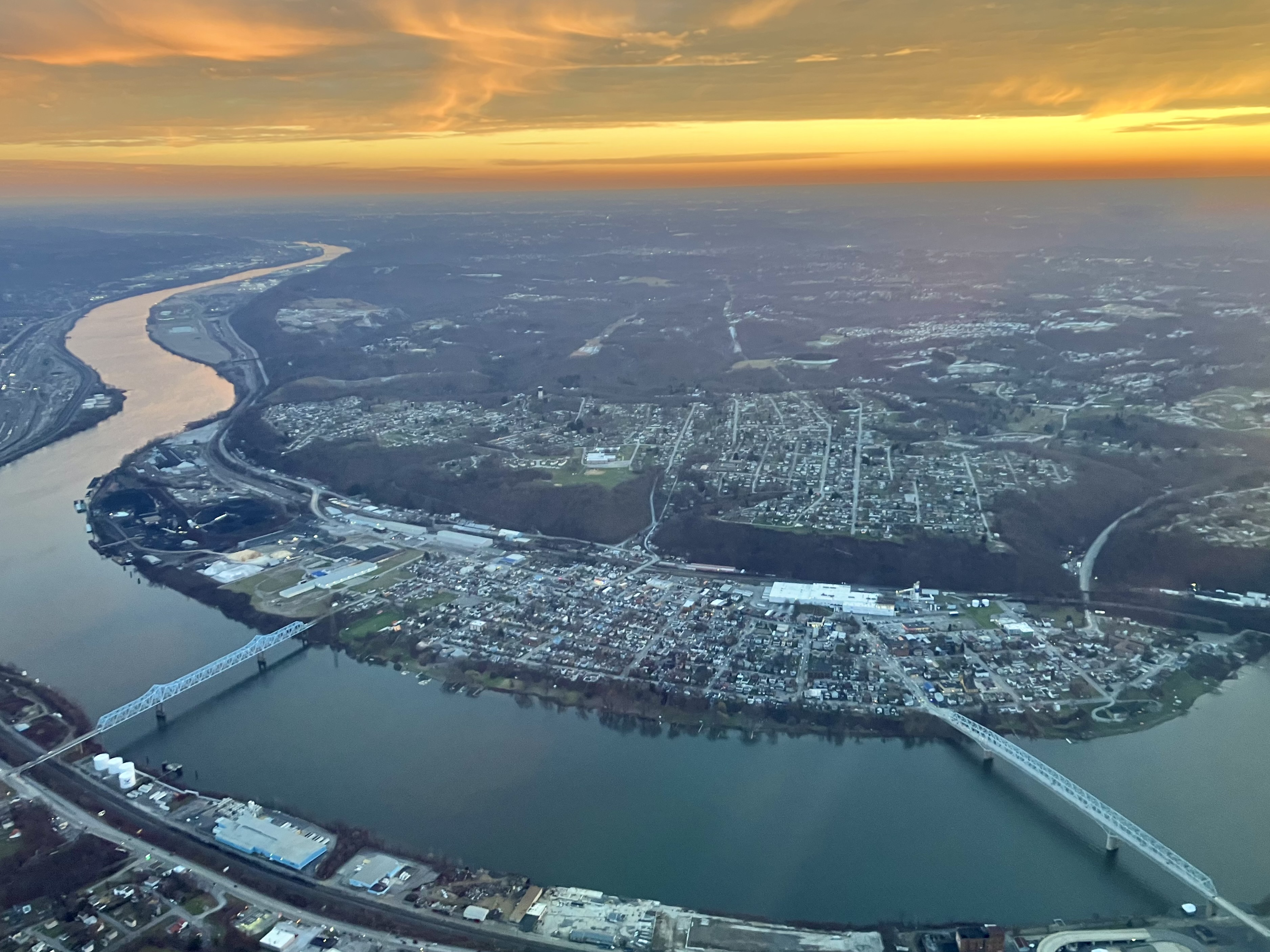
Aerial view of Monaca

In the borough's history, manufacturers made tons of enameled porcelain ware, glass, tile, tubing, drawn steel and wire. Today, Stölzle Glass USA (former Phoenix Glass/Anchor Hocking Plant #44) is in Monaca.

In 2003, Monaca was the epicenter of one of the most widespread hepatitis A outbreaks in the United States, which afflicted at least 640 people and killed four in northeastern Ohio and southwestern Pennsylvania. The outbreak was blamed on tainted green onions at a Chi-Chi's restaurant in the town.

In March 2012, Royal Dutch Shell announced its intention to study and build a multi-billion-dollar ethane cracker complex near Monaca to produce ethylene from abundant Marcellus shale natural gas in the area. It would be the first such unit built in the northeastern U.S. utilizing natural gas obtained from hydraulic fracturing as feedstock. In June 2016, Shell Chemical Appalachia committed to build the Shell Pennsylvania Petrochemicals Complex at the former Horsehead Corporation zinc site near Monaca in Potter Township.

== Geography ==
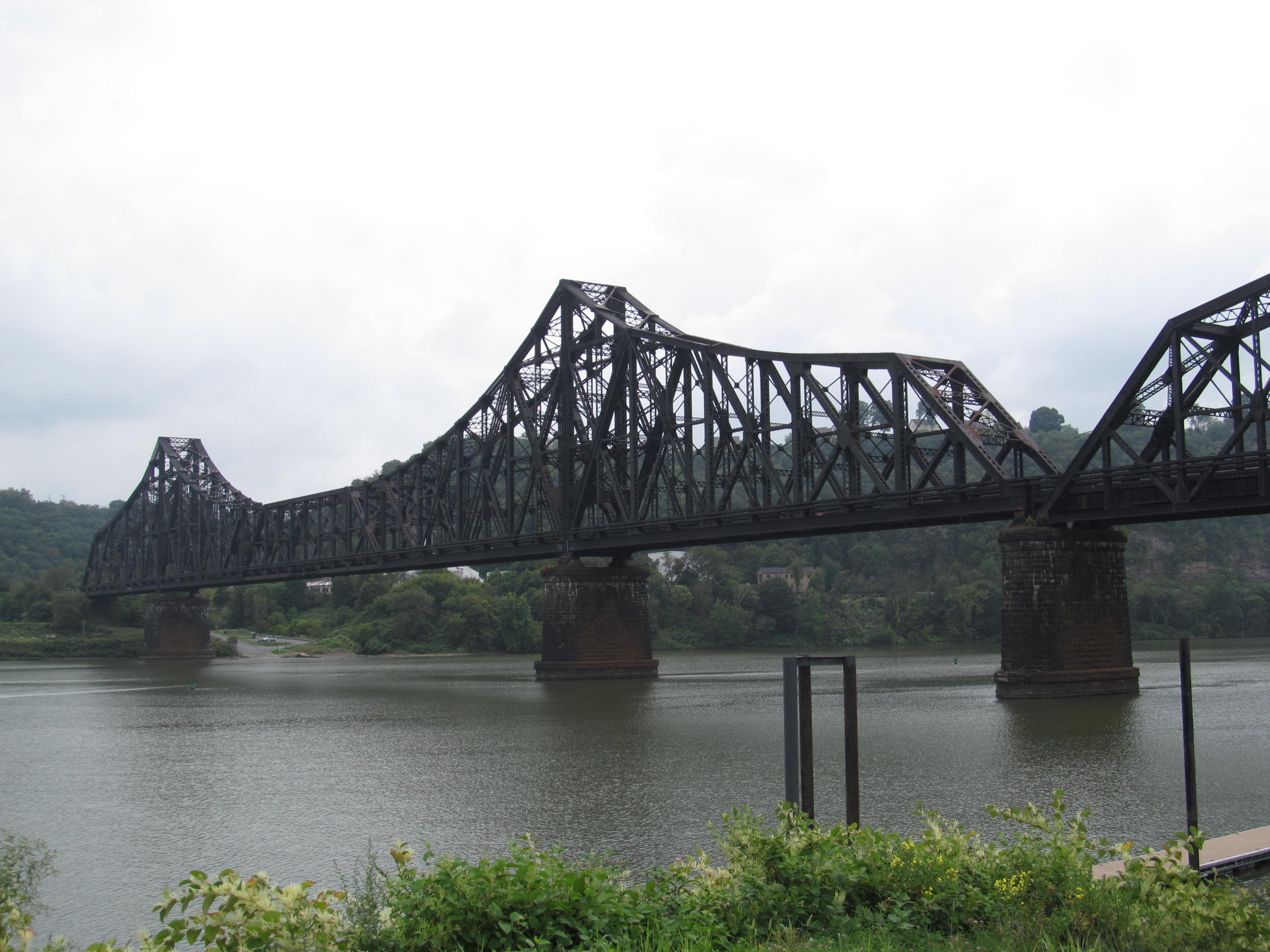
The Beaver Bridge is one of three bridges in Monaca

Monaca is located at 40°41′2″N 80°16′37″W (40.683966, −80.276986), on the south side of the Ohio River.

According to the United States Census Bureau, the borough has an area of 2.4 square miles (6.2 km^{2}), of which 2.0 square miles (5.3 km^{2}) is land and 0.35 square miles (0.9 km^{2}), or 14.89%, is water.

=== Surrounding and adjacent neighborhoods ===
Monaca has only one land border, with Center Township to the south and west. Across the Ohio River, Monaca runs adjacent with (from west to southeast) Beaver, Bridgewater, Rochester, East Rochester, Freedom, and Conway.

Two bridges cross the Ohio River from Monaca: the Rochester–Monaca Bridge carries Pennsylvania Route 18 into Rochester, and the Monaca–East Rochester Bridge carries Pennsylvania Route 51 into East Rochester. A third bridge, the Beaver Bridge, carries rail tracks owned by CSX Transportation from Monaca into Bridgewater.

== Demographics ==
Historical population
Census	Pop.	Note	%±
1840	325		—
1850	473		45.5%
1860	434		−8.2%
1870	554		27.6%
1880	458		−17.3%
1890	1,494		226.2%
1900	2,008		34.4%
1910	3,376		68.1%
1920	3,838		13.7%
1930	4,641		20.9%
1940	7,061		52.1%
1950	7,415		5.0%
1960	8,394		13.2%
1970	7,486		−10.8%
1980	7,661		2.3%
1990	6,739		−12.0%
2000	6,286		−6.7%
2010	5,737		−8.7%
2020	5,625		−2.0%
2021 (est.)	5,542	▼	−1.5%

As of the 2000 census, there were 6,286 people, 2,709 households, and 1,741 families residing in the borough. The population density was 3,004.0 inhabitants per square mile (1,159.9/km^{2}). There were 2,892 housing units at an average density of 1,382.1 per square mile (533.6/km^{2}). The racial makeup of the borough was 97.1% White, 1.9% African American, 0.2% Asian, 0% from other races, and 0.7% from two or more races. Hispanic or Latino of any race were 0.6% of the population.

There were 2,709 households, out of which 26.8% had children under the age of 18 living with them, 47.6% were married couples living together, 12.7% had a female householder with no husband present, and 35.7% were non-families. 32.2% of all households were made up of individuals, and 18.8% had someone living alone who was 65 years of age or older. The average household size was 2.31 and the average family size was 2.93.

In the borough the population was spread out, with 22.0% under the age of 18, 6.8% from 18 to 24, 26.9% from 25 to 44, 23.2% from 45 to 64, and 21.1% who were 65 years of age or older. The median age was 41 years. For every 100 females, there were 87.3 males. For every 100 females age 18 and over, there were 83.4 males.

The median income for a household in the borough was $33,706, and the median income for a family was $45,046. Males had a median income of $35,436 versus $24,375 for females. The per capita income for the borough was $17,001. About 8.1% of families and 8.9% of the population were below the poverty line, including 16.7% of those under age 18 and 3.1% of those age 65 or over.

The borough has been experiencing some growth in development and population starting in 2019 from new employers and businesses coming to the area.

== Education ==
Children in Monaca are served by the Central Valley School District. It was established on July 1, 2009, from the former Center Area School District and Monaca School District. It was Pennsylvania's first "voluntary" public school district merger, and took five years. The schools serving Monaca are:

- Center Grange Primary School – grades K–2
- Todd Lane Elementary School – 3–5
- Central Valley Middle School – grades 6–8
- Central Valley High School – grades 9–12

== Notable people ==
- Brad Davis, professional basketball player
- Mickey Davis, professional basketball player
- Ed DeChellis, head coach of the Navy men's basketball team
- Dusty Drake, country music artist
- Robert Foster, NFL player for the Buffalo Bills
- Mike Manzo, former chief of staff to Pennsylvania House of Representatives Majority Leader Bill DeWeese
- Teddy Yarosz, boxer, former Middleweight Champion of the World
- Bill Zopf, NBA player for the Milwaukee Bucks
- John Karcis, NFL player/coach

== See also ==
- List of cities and towns along the Ohio River
