= 1921 Pittsburgh Panthers football team =

American college football season

1921 Pittsburgh Panthers football
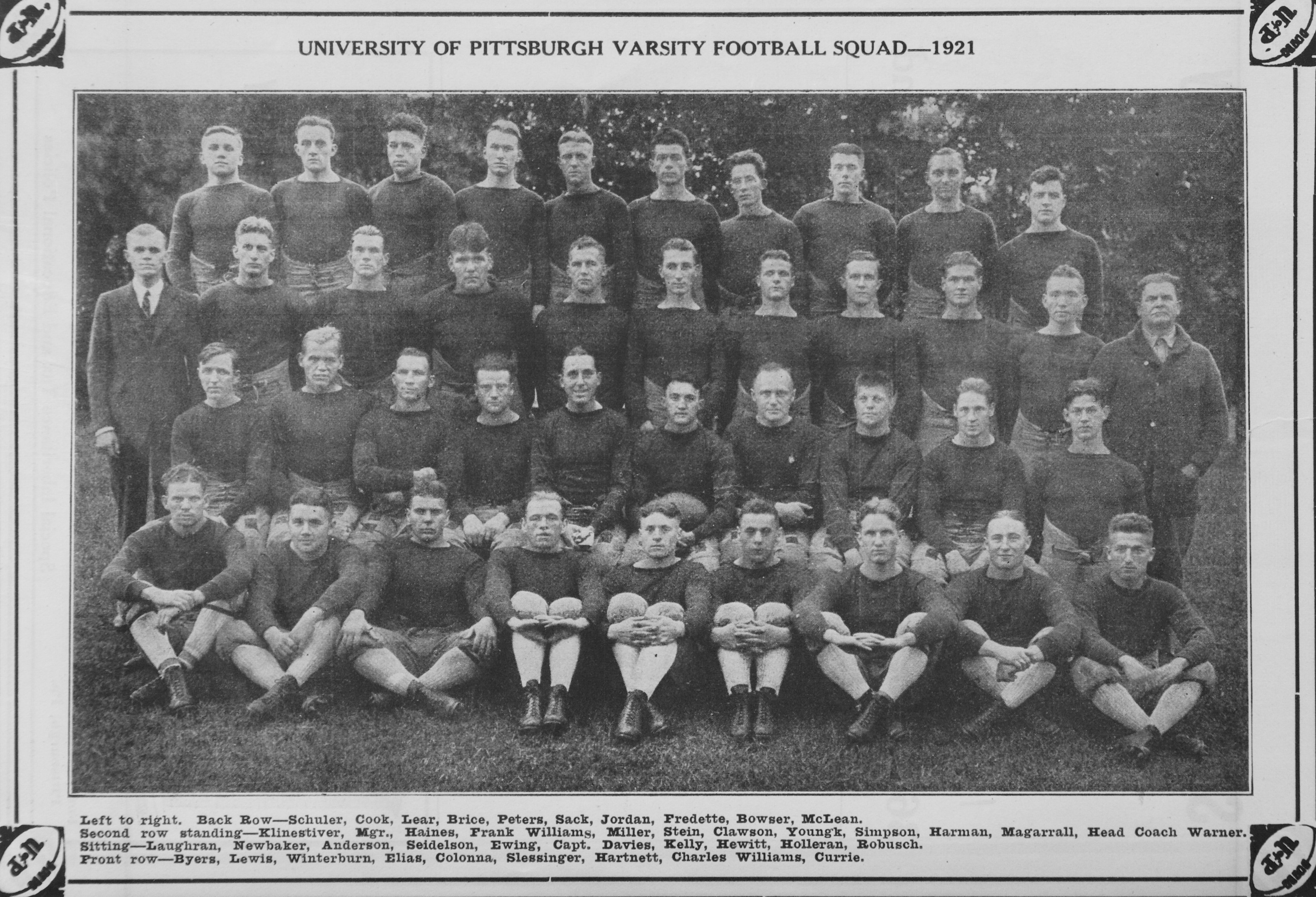
- Conference: Independent
- Record: 5–3–1
- Head coach: Pop Warner (7th season)
- Captain: Tom Davies
- Home stadium: Forbes Field

Uniform
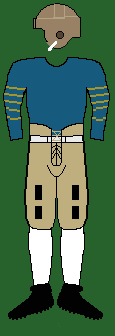

1921 Eastern college football independents records
	Conf.			Overall
Team	W	L	T	W		L		T
Washington & Jefferson		–		10	–	0	–	1
Lafayette		–		9	–	0	–	0
Cornell		–		8	–	0	–	0
Penn State		–		8	–	0	–	2
Yale		–		8	–	1	–	0
New Hampshire		–		8	–	1	–	1
Franklin & Marshall		–		6	–	1	–	2
Villanova		–		6	–	1	–	2
Carnegie Tech		–		7	–	2	–	0
Syracuse		–		7	–	2	–	0
Harvard		–		7	–	2	–	1
Boston University		–		6	–	2	–	0
Dartmouth		–		6	–	2	–	1
Brown		–		5	–	3	–	1
Bucknell		–		5	–	3	–	1
Geneva		–		5	–	3	–	1
Pittsburgh		–		5	–	3	–	1
Holy Cross		–		5	–	3	–	0
Army		–		6	–	4	–	0
Princeton		–		4	–	3	–	0
Boston College		–		4	–	3	–	1
Fordham		–		4	–	3	–	2
Penn		–		4	–	3	–	2
Colgate		–		4	–	4	–	2
Lehigh		–		4	–	4	–	0
Springfield		–		4	–	5	–	2
Vermont		–		3	–	4	–	0
NYU		–		2	–	3	–	3
Buffalo		–		2	–	3	–	2
Drexel		–		2	–	3	–	1
Rutgers		–		4	–	6	–	0
Rhode Island State		–		3	–	5	–	0
Columbia		–		2	–	6	–	0
Tufts		–		1	–	5	–	2
Duquesne		–		0	–	4	–	1

The 1921 Pittsburgh Panthers football team was an American football team that represented the University of Pittsburgh as an independent during the 1921 college football season. In its seventh season under head coach Pop Warner, the team compiled a 5–3–1 record and outscored all opponents by a total of 133 to 50. The team played its home games at Forbes Field in Pittsburgh.

The 1921 West Virginia vs. Pittsburgh football game was the first college football game to be broadcast live on radio.

== Schedule ==
Date	Opponent	Site	Result	Attendance	Source
September 24	at Geneva	High School Field; Beaver Falls, PA	W 28–0		
October 1	at Lafayette	March Field; Easton, PA	L 0–6	15,000	
October 8	West Virginia	Forbes Field; Pittsburgh, PA (rivalry)	W 21–13	18,000	
October 15	Cincinnati	Forbes Field; Pittsburgh, PA	W 21–14		
October 22	Syracuse	Forbes Field; Pittsburgh, PA	W 35–0	22,000–25,000	
October 29	at Penn	Franklin Field; Philadelphia, PA	W 28–0	30,000	
November 5	Nebraska	Forbes Field; Pittsburgh, PA	L 0–10	10,000	
November 12	Washington & Jefferson	Forbes Field; Pittsburgh, PA	L 0–7	28,000–30,000	
November 24	Penn State	Forbes Field; Pittsburgh, PA (rivalry)	T 0–0	34,000	

== Preseason ==
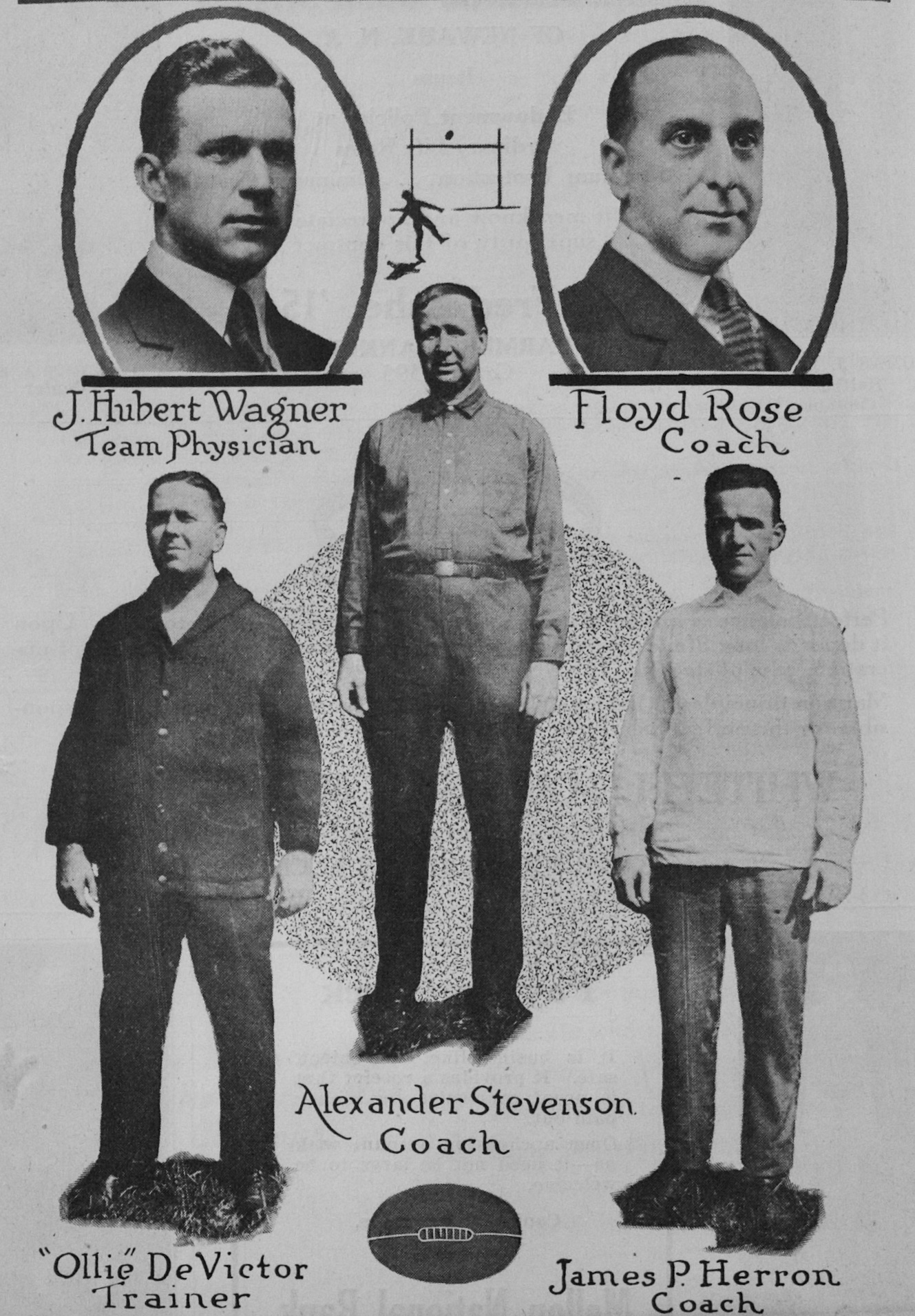
Coach Warner's 1921 Football Staff

After compiling a record of 42–3–3 in his previous six seasons, Glenn Warner returned for his seventh season as Pitt coach with some reservations about "Pittsburgh's long term commitment to remaining competitive, which to his thinking included building a much-needed stadium and continuing to recruit top-level talent for the football squad." The Stanford University coaching offer piqued his interest but he remained committed to his contract. The Athletic Department added two former Pitt players to the organization - Pat Herron was named assistant coach and Dr. J. Huber Wagner was appointed team physician.

Tom Davies was elected captain for the 1921 season and Lawrence I. Klinestiver was appointed student manager.

On September 6 the 1921 Pitt football prospects gathered at Camp Hamilton for their 2 1/2-week preseason training period. Since only four lettermen were lost from the 1920 squad – John McCrory, James Bond, William Edgar, and Herbert McCracken - and with the strong contingent from the 1920 freshmen team moving up, Coach Warner was expected to place another strong team on the field. Walter Ritchie, 1904 Pitt quarterback, and Lone Star Dietz, the famous Carlisle Indian (1909–1912), assisted Coach Warner the opening week of camp. Ritchie was assistant coach at Illinois Wesleyan and Dietz was the Purdue head coach. Ollie DeVictor was the newly appointed trainer and H. L. Westerman, senior med-student, was in charge of first aid. New facilities installed at the camp included a nine-hole golf course and tennis courts for the players enjoyment. The Panther squad broke camp on September 23 and returned to Pittsburgh. The next day they opened the 1921 season at Beaver Falls against the Covenantors of Geneva College.

The graduate manager arranged a nine-game schedule that was as hard as the 1920 schedule. Because Pitt used Forbes Field for its home games, the first two games were on the road – Geneva and Lafayette. The location of the third game depended on whether or not the Pirates won the pennant. If yes, the Panthers played at Cincinnati, if no, the Panthers played West Virginia at home. Nebraska replaced Georgia Tech in a home game. "The Westerners played good football against Penn State last fall and with new coach Fred Dawson are expected to put up a stern battle here. The team is one of the biggest in the country, virtually all the players being well over six feet tall in height. All in all, local fans should see some tip-top football in the home games, and there is no reason why the season should not be one of the biggest ever, so far as crowds go, as well as one of the most successful playing campaigns in the Panthers history."

"As the Panthers defend the colors of the University of Pittsburgh on the football field this fall, their performances will be announced by radiophone. Through the co-operation of Westinghouse Electric & Manufacturing Co., one of the Westinghouse wireless sets will be installed in the press box and it will announce to the public every play executed by the blue and gold team and their opponents. This will afford the alumni and friends of the team who on account of living at a distance will not be able to attend the games at Forbes Field, an opportunity of having the game brought to their homes. The Westinghouse Co. has made wonderful strides in the wireless field ion broadcasting information, entertainments and athletics the past year. Last winter, when the Pitt basketball team played at Motor Square Garden, the results were received as far north as Toronto, Can., as far west as Nebraska, as far south as the Gulf of Mexico, and east to the Atlantic coast. In many instances the universities and colleges of the United States have installed wireless phones, making it possible for the students who cannot attend the games to assemble at the college and receive the results."

== Coaching staff ==
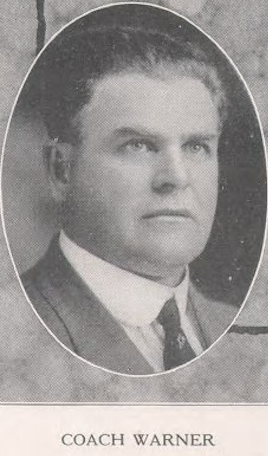
Pop Warner

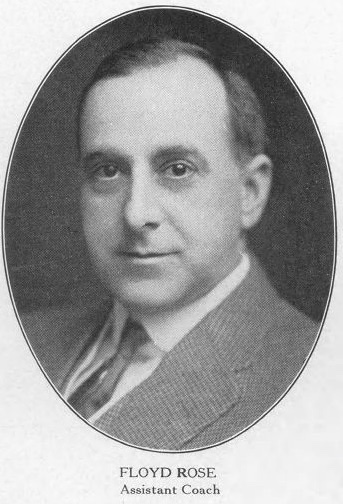
Floyd Rose

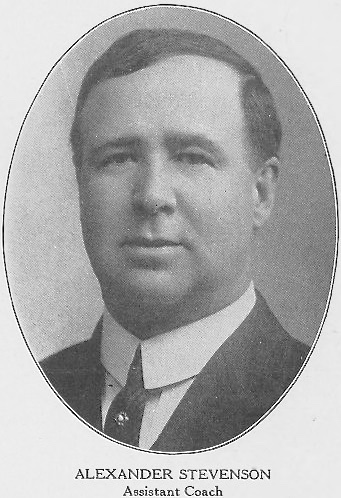
Alexander Stevenson

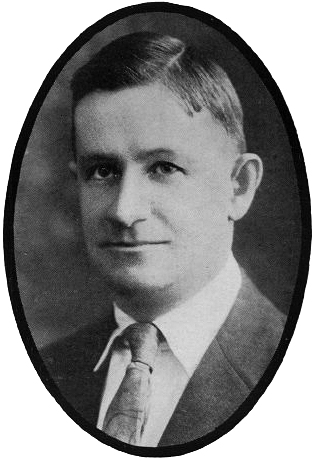
Andrew Kerr

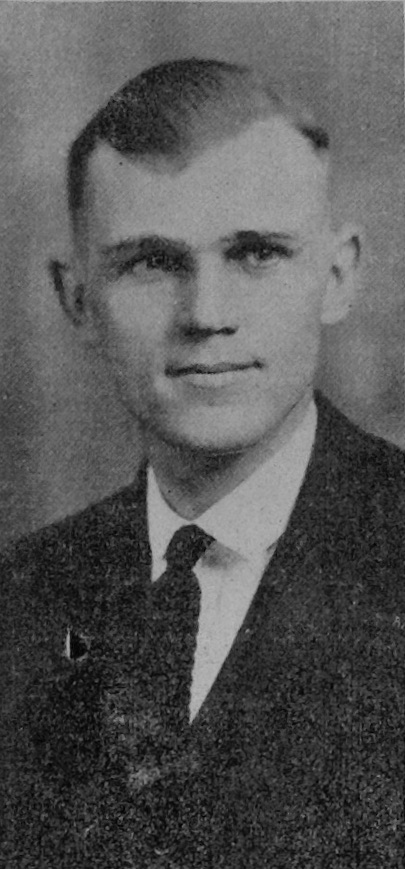
Lawrence I. Klinestiver

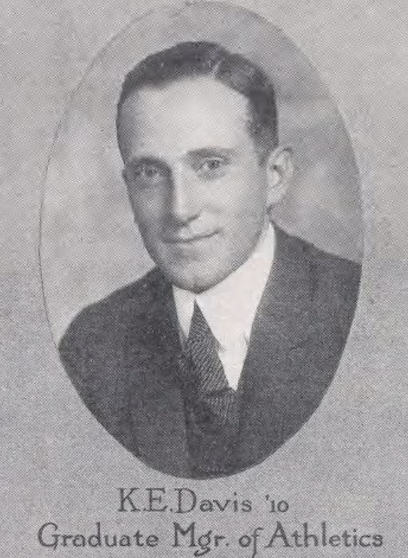
Karl E. Davis

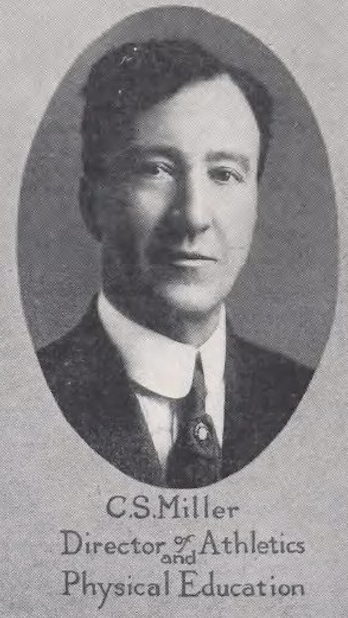
Charles S. Miller

1921 Pittsburgh Panthers football staff
Coaching staff: Pop Warner – Head coach; Floyd Rose – Assistant coach; Alexander Stevenson – Assistant coach; Pat Herron – Assistant coach; Andrew Kerr – Freshman coach	Support staff: Lawrence I. Klinestiver – student football manager; J. Huber Wagner – team physician; Ollie DeVictor – team trainer; Karl E. Davis – graduate manager of athletics; Charles S. Miller – director of athletics

== Roster ==
1921 Pittsburgh Panthers football roster
Player	Position	Games	Height	Weight	Age	Class	Prep School	Hometown
John Anderson*	halfback	6	5' 9"	160	25	1923	Ben Avon H. S.	Ben Avon, PA
Charles Bowser*	center	8	5' 11"	172	23	1923	Johnstown H. S.	Johnstown, PA
Charles B. Bryce	guard	0	6' 1"	164	18	1924	McKeesport H. S.	McKeesport, PA
J. Franklin Byers	halfback	1	5' 11"	152	20	1923	Turtle Creek H. S.	Turtle Creek, PA
James Clark*	guard	5	5' 10"	192	20	1923	Allegheny H. S.	Pittsburgh, PA
John Clawson	end	1	6' 1"	164	24	1923	The Kiski School	Irwin, PA
Nicolas Colonna*	fullback	8	5' 8"	167	29	1923	Woodlawn H. S.	Woodlawn, PA
John Cook	guard	0	6'	174	21	1923	Norwin H. S.	Irwin, PA
J. P. Currie	fullback	0	5' 7"	156	23	1924	Fifth Ave. H. S.	Pittsburgh, PA
Thomas Davies*	halfback	8	5' 9"	155	22	1922	The Kiski School	Washington, PA
Thomas Elias	halfback	2	5' 8"	155	22	1923	Schenley H. S.	Pittsburgh, PA
Fred Ewing*	end	6	5' 10"	165	23	1922	The Kiski School	Saltsburg, PA
Edmund Fredette*	center	4	5' 11"	178	21	1924	The Kiski School	Wilkinsburg, PA
William Haines	end	0	6'	160	20	1924	Crafton H. S.	Crafton, PA
Harvey Harman*	tackle	9	6'	198	20	1922	Peabody H. S.	Pittsburgh, PA
Mike Hartnett*	halfback	4	5' 11"	158	21	1923	Johnstown H. S.	Johnstown, PA
Orville Hewitt*	fullback	9	5' 10"	199	23	1923	Wilkinsburg H. S.	Wilkinsburg, PA
Tom Holleran*	quarterback	8	5' 7"	168	23	1923	The Kiski School	Pittsburgh, PA
Lloyd Jordan*	end	5	5' 10"	167	20	1924	Punxutawney H. S.	Punxutawney, PA
Leon Kelly*	tackle	8	5' 10"	172	24	1922	Mansfield Normal	Wellsboro, PA
John Laughran	halfback	0	5' 10"	144	23	1922	Braddock H. S.	Braddock, PA
Lester Lear	guard	0	6' 1"	214	21	1924	Monessen H. S.	Monessen, PA
Charles Lewis	guard	0	5' 7"	182	21	1924	Monessen H. S.	Monessen, PA
John McLean*	tackle	7	5' 11"	187	23	1923	Homestead H.S.	Homestead PA
Henry Magarral	center	2	5' 11"	160	22	1923	Westinghouse H. S.	Pittsburgh, PA
John Miller	center	2	6' 1"	244	19	1923	Mt. Union H. S.	Mt. Union, PA
Philip Newbaker	tackle	0	6' 1"	164	22	1924	Wyoming Seminary	Windber, PA
Fred Peters*	end	9	6' 2"	184	22	1922	Dickinson H. S.	Dickinson, NJ
William Robusch	fullback	1	6'	167	20	1924	Salem H. S.	Salem, OH
Jacob Sack*	tackle	8	6' 2"	181	19	1923	Fifth Avenue H. S.	Pittsburgh, PA
Harry Seidelson*	guard	6	6' 1"	184	20	1924	Fifth Avenue H. S.	Pittsburgh, PA
Nick Shuler*	quarterback	4	5' 11"	178	19	1924	Elwood City H. S.	Elwood City, PA
Richard M. Simpson	tackle	2	5' 11"	186	21	1923	Huntingdon H. S.	Huntingdon, PA
E. F. Slessinger	end	1	5' 9"	166	18	1924	Turtle Creek H. S.	Turtle Creek, PA
Herb Stein*	center	8	5' 11"	180	22	1923	The Kiski School	Niles, OH
Charles Williams*	halfback	7	5' 7"	167	21	1924	Wellsburg H. S.	Wellsburg, WVA
Frank W. Williams*	end	9	6' 2"	173	21	1923	The Kiski School	Parnassus, PA
Charles Winterburn*	halfback	9	5' 6"	176	21	1923	Elizabeth H. S.	Elizabeth, PA
Paul Youngk	end	2	6'	168	20	1924	Westinghouse H. S.	Pittsburgh, PA
Lawrence I. Klinestiver*	manager					1922	Sheffield H. S.	Sheffield, PA
* Letterman

== Game summaries ==
=== At Geneva ===
Week 1: Pitt at Geneva

Team	1	2	3	4	Total
• Pitt	7	0	7	14	28
Geneva	0	0	0	0	0

- Date: September 24, 1921
- Location: High school field
  Beaver Falls, PA
- Game start: 4:15 p.m.
- Referee: Dan B. Daugherty (W. & J.)

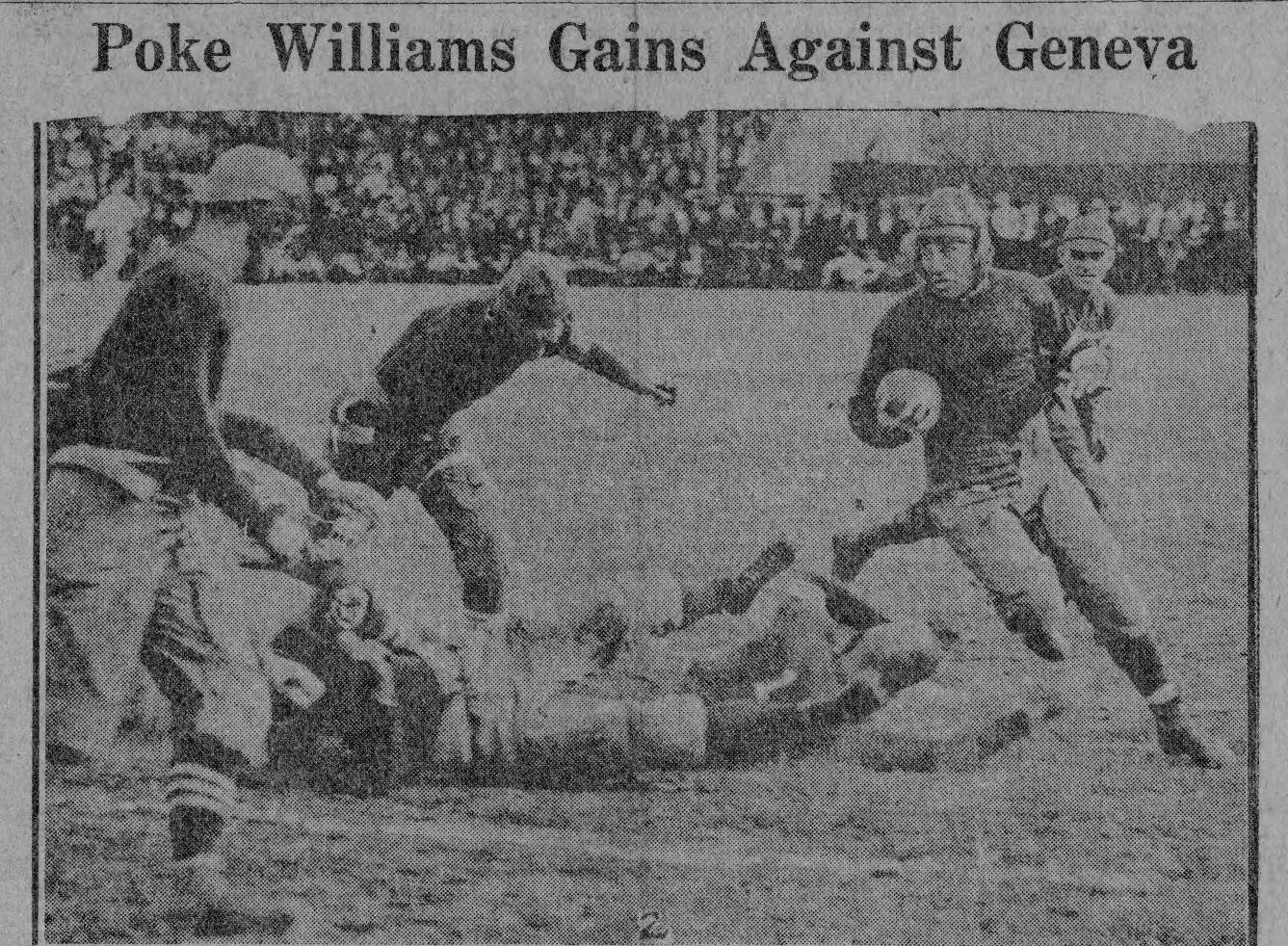
Action photo of Poke Williams against Geneva

For the third straight year the Panthers opened their football season in Beaver Falls, PA against the Covenanters of Geneva College. Geneva was led by fifth year coach Philip Henry Bridenbaugh. The Geneva lineup had Harold Krotzer, a former Panther, at fullback and Joseph Lynch, a Princeton transfer, at tackle. The Covenanters finished the season with a 5–3–1 record.

The Panther squad, students and alumni traveled to Beaver Falls on the P. & L. E. railroad. Since school was not officially in session, the band was not in attendance. The Pitt squad left Pittsburgh at 10 a.m. and had a noon lunch at the Grand Hotel in Beaver Falls. Coach Warner planned to start his strongest eleven and hoped to play everyone. However, he cautioned the Panthers that the Geneva squad "are many percent stronger than in 1920."

Coach Warner's words seemed prophetic as "the Covenanters put up a gritty battle and held the Panthers to one touchdown in the first half." Pitt backs Tom Davies and John Anderson were both injured early in the game. Late in the first quarter sophomore Charles "Poke" Williams raced 32 yards around right end for a touchdown the first time he touched the ball. Tom Holleran kicked the goal. The first half ended with the score 7–0 in Pitt's favor. Late in the third period, Nick Colonna scored from the five to pad the lead. Holleran was successful on the try for goal. Fullback Bill Robusch added two scores in the last quarter and Williams kicked both goals to close out the scoring. Pitt 28 to Geneva 0. All the touchdowns were scored by stars from the 1920 freshman team and twenty-four players received playing time.

The Pitt lineup for the game against Geneva was Herb Stein (left end), Harvey Harman (left tackle), John Sack (left guard), Henry Magarral (center), Harry Seidelson (right guard), John McLean (right tackle), Frank Williams (right end), Tom Holleran (quarterback), Tom Davies (left halfback), John Anderson (right halfback), and Orville Hewitt (fullback). Substitutes appearing in the game for Pitt were Edmund Fredette, Fred Peters, Charles Williams, Mike Hartnett, Nick Colonna, Nick Shuler, Bill Robusch, Fred Ewing, Leon Kelly, John Miller, Richard Simpson, Charles Winterburn, and Paul Youngk. The game was played in 15-minute quarters.

=== At Lafayette ===
Week 2: Pitt at Lafayette

Team	1	2	3	4	Total
Pitt	0	0	0	0	0
• Lafayette	6	0	0	0	6

- Date: October 1, 1921
- Location: March Field
  Easton, PA
- Game start: 3:00 p.m.
- Game attendance: 15,000
- Referee: Robert W. Maxwell (Swarthmore)

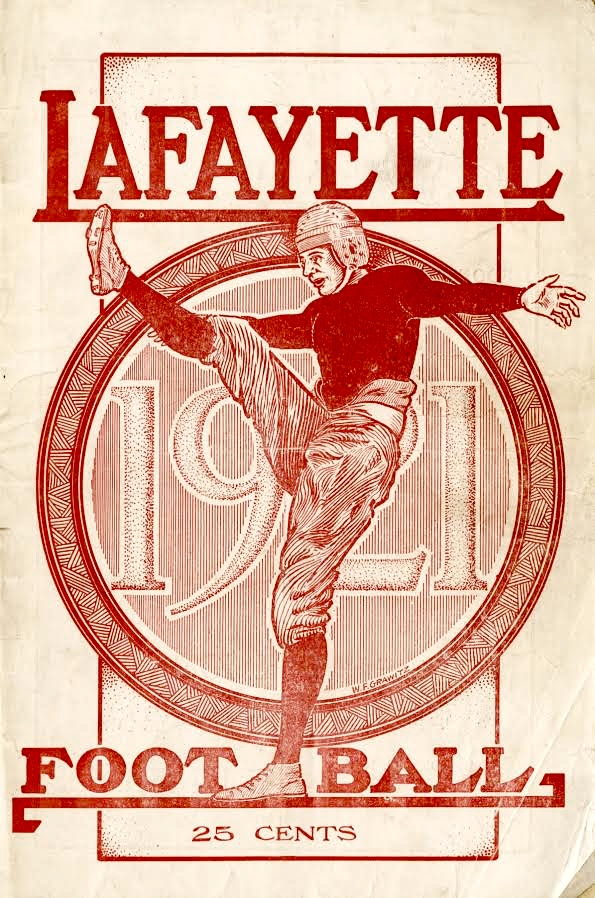
The program for the October 1, 1921 Pitt vs. Lafayette game in Easton, Pennsylvania

The second road trip was to Easton, Pennsylvania to do battle with third-year coach Jock Sutherland's Lafayette Leopards. The team departed Pittsburgh Thursday evening at 8:05 and arrived in Harrisburg at 6:00 a.m. Friday for breakfast. They then hopped aboard the P.& R. Railroad car and arrived in Allentown around 9:30 a.m. A worried Coach Warner held practice at the Lehigh Valley Country Club Friday afternoon. Saturday at noon the team made its way to Easton for the 3:00 o'clock kick-off. "After the game they will board their train at Phillipsburg, NJ, which is directly opposite Easton, and go thence to Trenton, where their sleeper will be awaiting them. They will arrive home at 8:12 Sunday morning."

Lafayette opened its season with a convincing 48–0 win over Muhlenberg College. Coach Sutherland had 16 returning lettermen, so "he can place the same team on the field this Saturday that gave Pitt such a hard tussle last year. With the advantage of playing on the home gridiron, Lafayette is hopeful of a victory." The Leopard line was anchored by consensus All-America Guard Frank Schwab.

Harry Keck of The Gazette Times was worried: "There is danger of a Pitt defeat in the meeting." Pitt was physically battered by Geneva. Starting halfback Anderson will be sidelined for three weeks. Captain Tom Davies may not play and guard Harry Seidelson will start under a handicap. "So, if Pitt has trouble winning from Lafayette Saturday, don't be surprised."

The Morning Call in Allentown reported: "The bell on old South College rang out the tidings of Lafayette's greatest football triumph in the last decade yesterday afternoon when the Maroon team crushed mighty Pitt by the score of 6–0. Fifteen thousand fans jammed historic March Stadium to witness the battle between these two gridiron juggernauts which was decided by a lone touchdown by 'Bots' Brunner in the first quarter of play." Pitt quarterback Holleran fumbled the ball on the Pitt 24-yard line and Lafayette recovered. The Leopards advanced the ball to the eight and proceeded to score on a triple pass from Gazella to Seasholtz to Brunner. The goal after was blocked. Lafayette 6 to Pitt 0. Pitt made 9 first downs but fumbled at inopportune moments. In the fourth quarter, Lafayette tried for a first down on fourth and one from their 18-yard line and failed. Pitt moved the ball to the 4-yard line on second down and then was penalized 5 yards back to the nine. On third down Hewitt gained four yards. On fourth down a pass to the end zone fell incomplete. "It was mighty Pitt's third defeat in the last four years and the victory gave Dr. Jock Sutherland the distinction of beating his old mentor, Glenn Warner. The two coaches were the first to congratulate each other after the game." Lafayette finished the season unbeaten with a 9–0 record.

The Pitt lineup for the game against Lafayette was Herb Stein (left end), Harvey Harman (left tackle), Jack Sack (left guard), Charles Bowser (center), Harry Seidelson (right guard), John McLean (right tackle), Frank Williams (right end), Tom Holleran (quarterback), Fred Byers (left halfback), Charles Williams (right halfback) and Orville Hewitt (fullback). Substitutes appearing in the game for Pitt were Fred Peters, Tom Davies, Leon Kelly, Nick Colonna and J. Charles Winterburn. The game was played in 15-minute quarters.

=== West Virginia ===
Week 3: West Virginia at Pitt

Team	1	2	3	4	Total
West Virginia	0	7	0	6	13
• Pitt	0	7	0	14	21

- Date: October 8, 1921
- Location: Forbes Field
  Pittsburgh, PA
- Game start: 3:00 p.m.
- Game attendance: 18,000
- Game weather: rain
- Referee: Nathan A. Tufts (Brown)

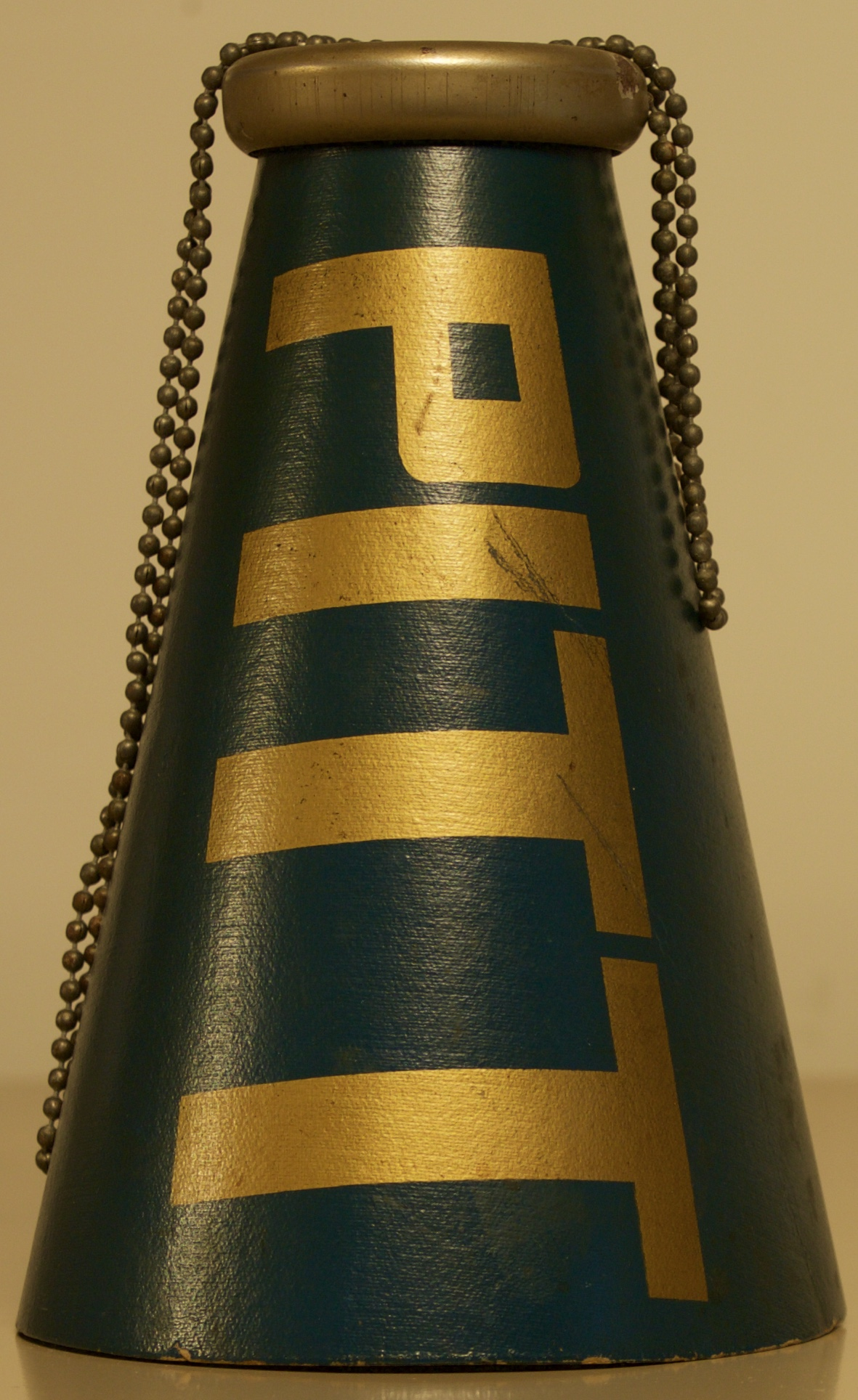
circa 1920s student megaphone

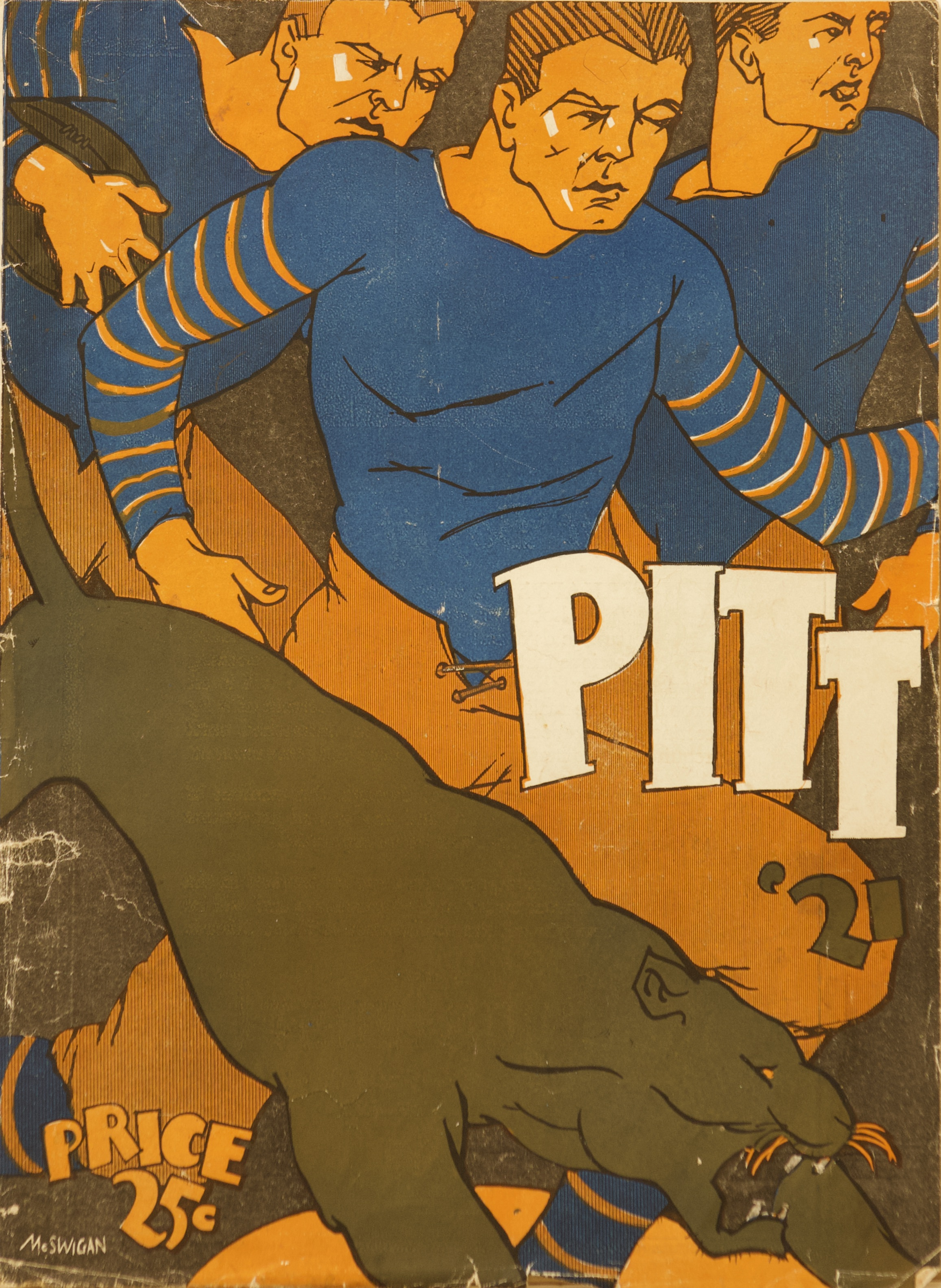
Program for October 8, 1921 Pitt vs. West Virginia game

The opening home game was the seventeenth edition of the "Backyard Brawl". West Virginia was led by first year coach Dr. Clarence W. "Fats" Spears, who coached Dartmouth for the past four years. The Mountaineers won their first two games convincingly, outscoring the opposition 85–3.

The Pittsburgh Press noted that there will be special streetcars in service from downtown and the east end to transport fans to the stadium. The 60 piece Pitt band under the direction of Director William Gregory will make its 1921 debut. Head cheerleader Clarence Smith will encourage the student body to use their megaphones. The big scoreboard will be in operation, the World Series score will be announced periodically and both teams will wear large numbers on their backs. The Pitt freshmen will play Slippery Rock Normal in a preliminary game at 1 o'clock and the varsity game will start about 3:00.

On game day The Press reported: "Spears' men are all in prime condition for today's game...The Panthers are badly crippled and will have at least three first-string men on the bench this afternoon -Capt. Tom Davies, John Anderson and 'Red' Seidelson." Charley Bowser will start at center but he was badly injured in Easton and may not be able to play the whole game.

The New York Times praised the Mountaineers: "The West Virginia University football team showed a very much improved style of attack built up under the tuition of Fatty Spears when they lined up against Glenn Warner's Pittsburgh Panthers at Forbes Field today and, although the visitors were beaten by the score of 21–13, they gave one of the best exhibitions of straight football and spectacular plays ever seen in this city." The Mountaineers finished the season with a 5–4–1 record.

Early in the first period West Virginia advanced the ball to the Pitt 9-yard line but the Panthers defense held and took over on downs. At the end of the first quarter, Pitt had advanced the ball to the West Virginia 12-yard line. Five plays into the second period, Charles Winterburn plunged over tackle for the touchdown. Tom Davies kicked goal and Pitt led 7 to 0. Mountaineer end Pierre Hill returned the kickoff to the West Virginia 43-yard line. On first down halfback George Hill raced 57 yards for the Mountaineers first touchdown. Kay was successful on the goal after and the score was tied at halftime: 7 to 7. No scoring occurred in the third period, but the fourth quarter had plenty of action. Early in the quarter, West Virginia again advanced the ball to the Pitt 9-yard line and was unable to score. After an exchange of possessions, the Panthers drove 62 yards for the go-ahead touchdown. Orville Hewitt plunged between Herb Stein and Harvey Harman from the two. Holleran kicked the goal: Pitt 14 to WVU 7. After the kick-off, Pitt forced the Mountaineers to punt and the Pitt offense marched the ball 63 yards for their final score of the afternoon. Poke Williams threw a 5-yard touchdown pass to Tom Holleran. Holleran kicked goal and Pitt led 21 to 7. Pitt kicked off and "George Hill grabbed the ball on his 10-yard line and ran down the middle of the field, eluded several tacklers and crossed the line after a run of 90 yards." Kay missed the goal after and the final score read: Pitt 21, West Virginia 13.

The Pitt lineup for the game against West Virginia was Herb Stein (left end), Harvey Harman (left tackle), Jack Sack (left guard), Charles Bowser (center), Fred Peters (right guard), John McLean (right tackle), Frank Williams (right end), Tom Holleran (quarterback), Tom Davies (left halfback), Charles Winterburn (right halfback) and Orville Hewitt (fullback). Substitutes appearing in the game for Pitt were John Miller, Edmund Fredette, James Clark, Nick Shuler, Mike Hartrnett and Charles Williams. The game was played in 15-minute quarters.

As noted above Harold W. Arlin, a Westinghouse engineer, broadcast this game over the KDKA radio station from his box seat at Forbes Field. The first college game broadcast live on radio.

=== Cincinnati ===
Week 4: Cincinnati at Pitt

Team	1	2	3	4	Total
Cincinnati	0	0	14	0	14
• Pitt	0	7	0	14	21

- Date: October 15, 1921
- Location: Forbes Field
  Pittsburgh, PA
- Game start: 3:00 p.m.
- Referee: Dex Very (Penn State)

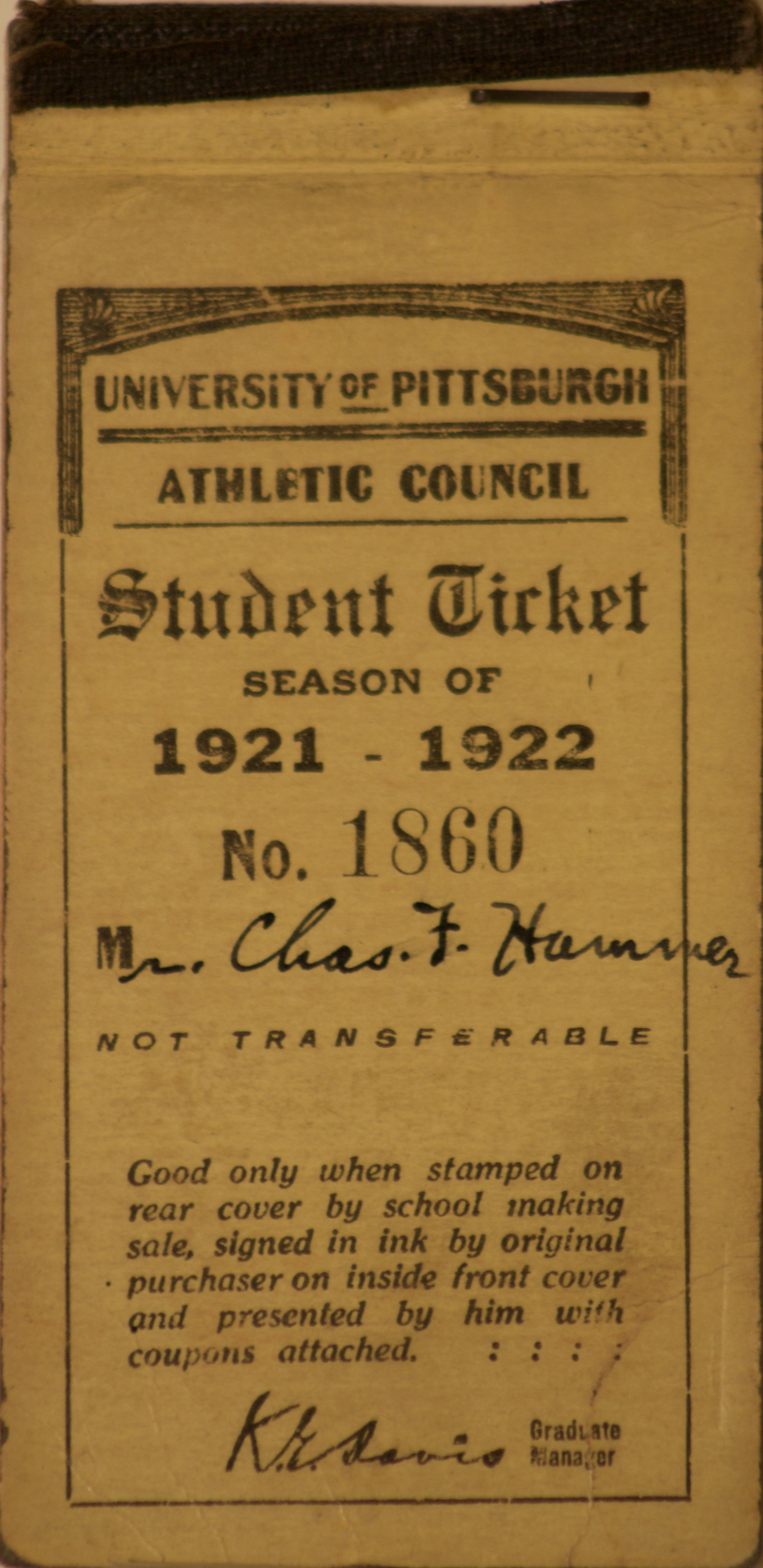
1921-22 student ticket booklet

The fourth game on the schedule pitted the Panthers against the University of Cincinnati Bearcats. Fourth year coach Boyd Chambers' team was 1–1 after beating Toledo and then losing 50–0 at West Virginia. "However, it is said that three or four of the Ohioan's best players were not available for that contest...Boyd Chambers has a lot of good material, but he has been working slowly with it, pointing his team especially for the Pitt encounter."

On game day Harry Keck of The Gazette Times noted: "For Pitt has an easy game on the books for this afternoon, one that will hardly draw a crowd large enough to pay expenses...In order to equalize things, Pitt will start the game with its real stars missing from the lineup. Capt. Stein, left end, Tom Davies, left halfback, and Tom Holleran, quarterback, have all been excused from the game and will take in the Tech - W. & J. battle, scouting the latter team for future reference."

After the game Mr. Keck was not very complimentary: "The University of Pittsburgh's football game with the University of Cincinnati at Forbes Field yesterday afternoon was a joke – and it almost proved a disastrous one for Pitt. The Panthers, or, rather the Panther scrubs won 21 to 14, but for a time they were in danger of being whipped, 14–7, by a team that had figured to be an easy victim. West Virginia University walloped Cincinnati, 50–0, two weeks ago and Pitt won from West Virginia a week later, 21–13. Pitt has no one but itself to blame for its exceedingly poor showing and it is certain that there will be one grand shakeup in football matters at the local university this week."

The Pitt offense advanced the ball well in the first quarter, but Charles Winterburn fumbled twice inside the Cincinnati 15-yard line. Mike Hartnett replaced Winterburn at the start of the second period. Pitt blocked a punt and Edmund Fredette recovered the ball on the Bearcat 30-yard line. A series of double passes from Charles "Poke" Williams to Nick Shuler produced the first touchdown of the game. Williams converted the goal after and the half time score read Pitt 7 to Cincinnati 0.

Midway in the third period Pitt recovered a Bearcat fumble on their 8-yard line. Thomas Elias, Pitt quarterback, tried to punt out of danger but shanked it. Bearcat halfback Schierloh caught it on the 12-yard line and with some interference in front was escorted into the end zone for the touchdown. Fratz kicked goal and the score was tied 7 to 7. Pitt was penalized for an illegal substitution and Cincinnati kicked off from the Pitt 30-yard line. The ball went into the end zone but was touched by a Pitt player and Myers of Cincinnati fell on it for another Bearcat touchdown. Fratz kicked goal and Cincinnati led 14–7.

At the end of the third quarter the Panthers had the ball on the Bearcat 15-yard line. Orville Hewitt, Poke Williams and Charles Bowser returned to the Pitt lineup for the fourth quarter. "Hewitt raring to go bucked through the line on four consecutive plays to score the touchdown and Poke Williams kicked goal, tying the score. Shortly afterward, Hewitt saved Pitt's bacon by intercepting a forward pass out in the open on his own 40-yard line and racing 60 yards unmolested to the goal line for the winning tally." Poke Williams converted the goal after and Pitt escaped defeat 21–14.

The Pitt lineup for the game against Cincinnati was Charles Bowser (left end), Richard Simpson (left tackle), John Clark (left guard), H. Edmund Fredette (center), Fred Peters (right guard), Leon Kelly (right tackle), Lloyd Jordan (right end), Nick Shuler (quarterback), Poke Williams (left halfback), Charles Winterburn (right halfback), and Orville Hewitt (fullback). Substitutes appearing in the game for Pitt were John Clawson, Fred Ewing, Harvey Harman, Jack Sack, Henry Magarrall, John McLean, Frank Williams, Mike Hartnett, Nicholas Colonna, Paul Youngk and Thomas Elias. The game was played in 15-minute quarters.

=== Syracuse ===
Week 5: Syracuse at Pitt

Team	1	2	3	4	Total
Syracuse	0	0	0	0	0
• Pitt	14	0	14	7	35

- Date: October 22, 1921
- Location: Forbes Field
  Pittsburgh, PA
- Game start: 3:00 p.m.
- Game attendance: 22,000 - 25,000
- Game weather: Clear and Cool
- Referee: Robert W. Maxwell (Swarthmore)

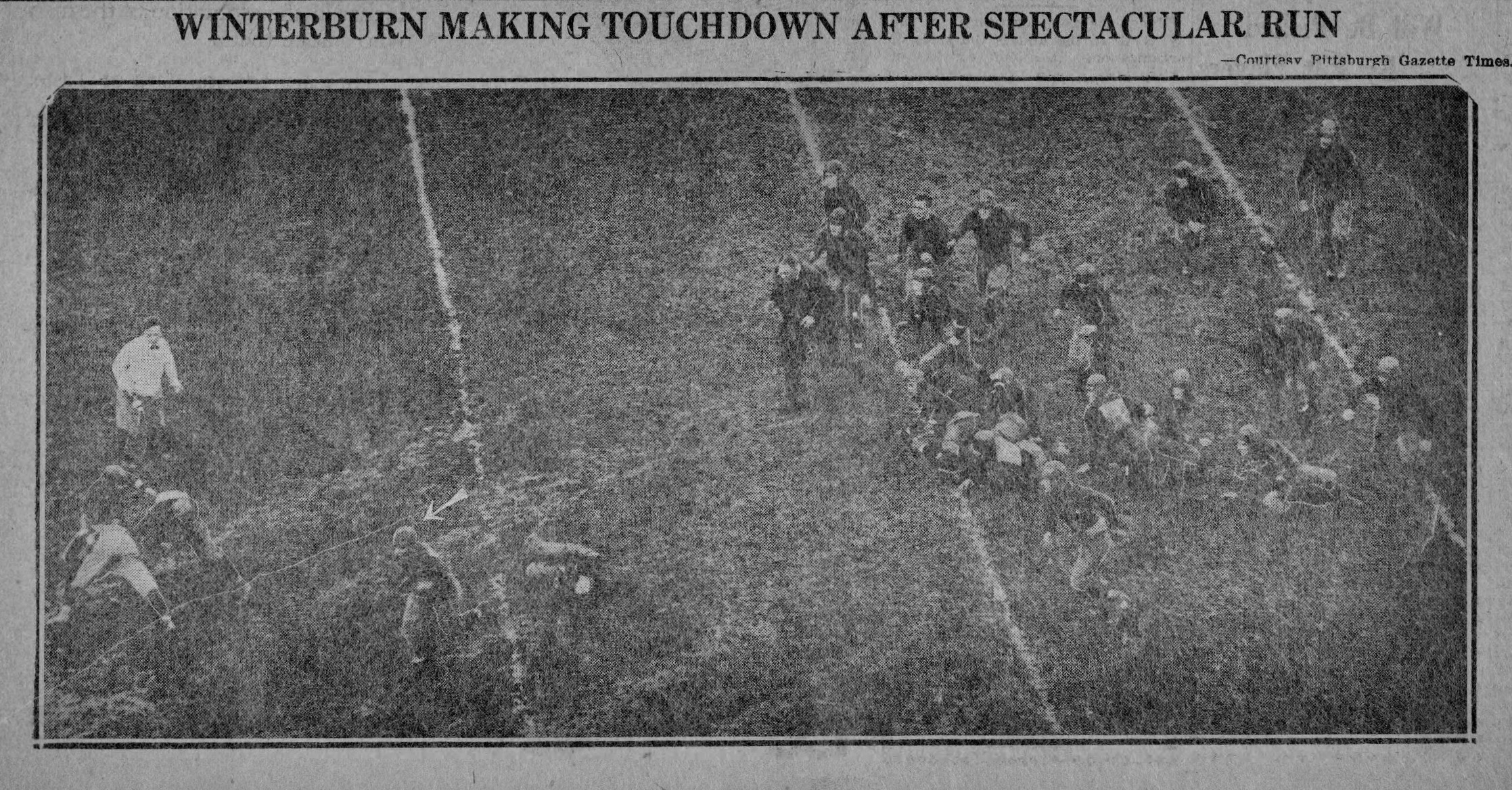
Charles Winterburn Goes 55 yards for touchdown vs. Syracuse October 22, 1921

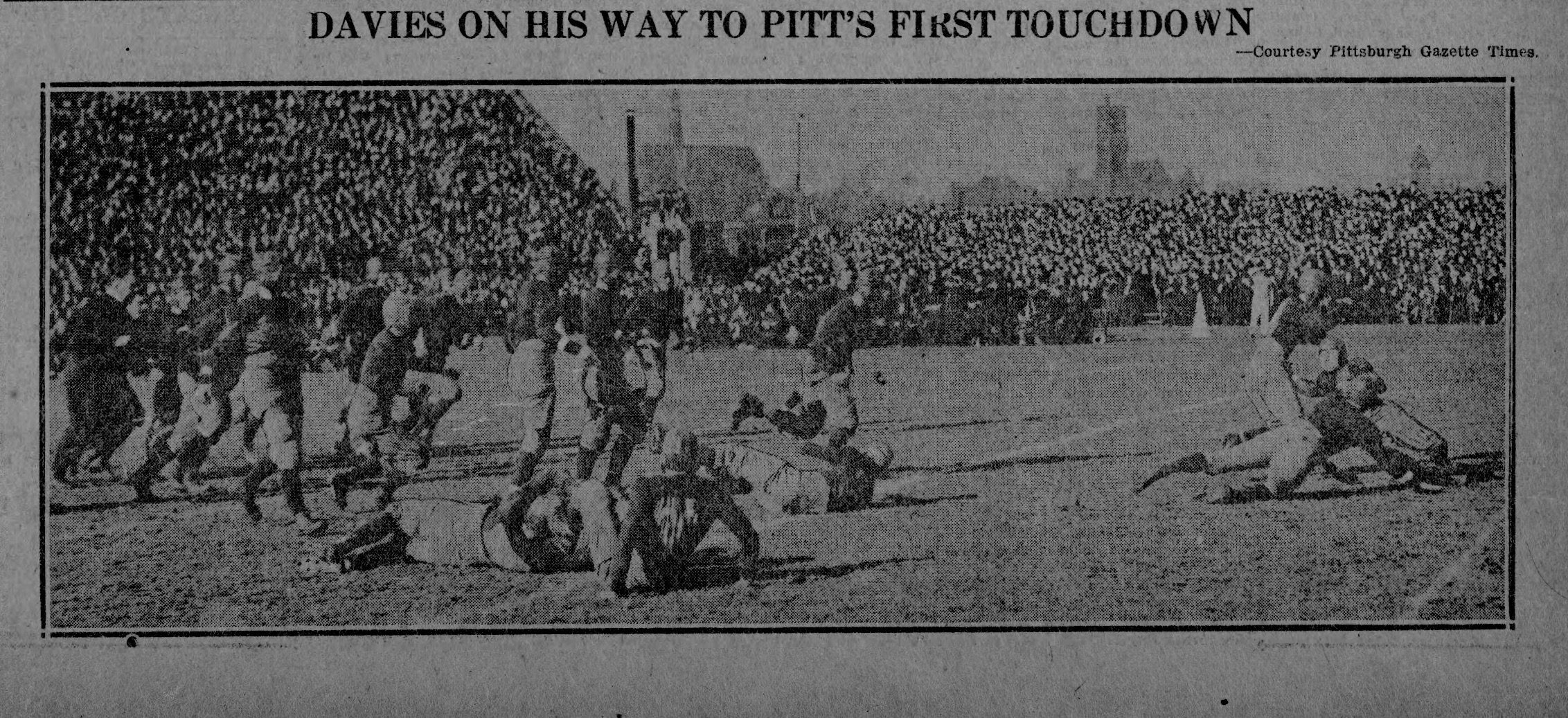
Tom Davies scores first of three touchdowns vs. Syracuse October 22, 1921

The 1921 Syracuse eleven led by second year coach Chick Meehan visited Forbes Field for the second time in the series short history. Syracuse arrived with an impressive 4–0 record and their defense, led by 1920 All-America tackle Bertrand Gulick, had not surrendered a point. The Pittsburgh Press noted that the Syracuse starting lineup was "in the pink of condition." Coach Meehan felt his team was stronger than the 1920 squad. "The Syracuse players are fighters and Coach Warner evidently has another of his strong teams so the game ought to be one of the best of the season," said Coach Meehan, "We ought to keep our slate clean and prevent any scores being registered against us. If we can beat Pitt we ought not to have much trouble in winning the rest of the games on our schedule."

The Pitt squad was healthy and according to Coach Warner "The team is right." Harry Keck of The Gazette Times wrote: "The splendid condition of the team has boosted its stock for the game immeasurably. One of the coaches said last night: 'We have our best possible combination in good condition for the first time this season and my personal opinion is that Pitt will win'."

Pitt won the game 35 to 0 and proved their coaches' predictions. Robert W. Maxwell, sporting editor of the Evening Public Ledger and referee for the game, wrote that the turning point of the game was Tom Holleran's opening kickoff return to midfield. Four plays later Pitt had their first touchdown and the rout was on. Pitt scored five touchdowns and five goals after. Tom Davies tallied three touchdowns and four goal kicks. The first touchdown came on a double pass from John Anderson from the twenty-yard line and the second was a line plunge from the one, both in the first quarter. The second period was scoreless as Davies missed two field goals and Anderson lost a fumble on the Syracuse 10-yard line. Early in the third quarter Charles Winterburn broke loose on a 55-yard jaunt and "shook off three tacklers for the Panthers third touchdown." Davies followed that with his third score on a two-yard plunge to close out the scoring for the third quarter. The second team played the fourth stanza and after a sustained drive Nick Colonna was "pushed over from the one" and Tom Holleran kicked the goal to end the scoring. Pitt gained 437 yards net and made 20 first downs. Syracuse made 4 yards net and one first down Syracuse finished the season with a 7–2 record.

The Pitt lineup for the game against Syracuse was Charles Bowser (left end), Harvey Harman (left tackle), John Sack (left guard), Herb Stein (center), Harry Seidelson (right guard), John McLean (right tackle), Frank Williams (right end), Tom Holleran (quarterback), Tom Davies (left halfback), John Anderson (right halfback), and Orville Hewitt (fullback). Substitutes appearing in the game for Pitt were Fred Ewing, John Clark, Fred Peters, Leon Kelly, Lloyd Jordan, Nick Shuler, Charles Williams, Charles Winterburn and Nick Colonna. The game was played in 15-minute quarters.

=== At Penn ===
Week 6: Pitt at Penn

Team	1	2	3	4	Total
• Pitt	14	14	0	0	28
Penn	0	0	0	0	0

- Date: October 29, 1921
- Location: Franklin Field
  Philadelphia, PA
- Game start: 2:30 p.m.
- Game attendance: 30,000
- Referee: E. J. O'Brien (Tufts)

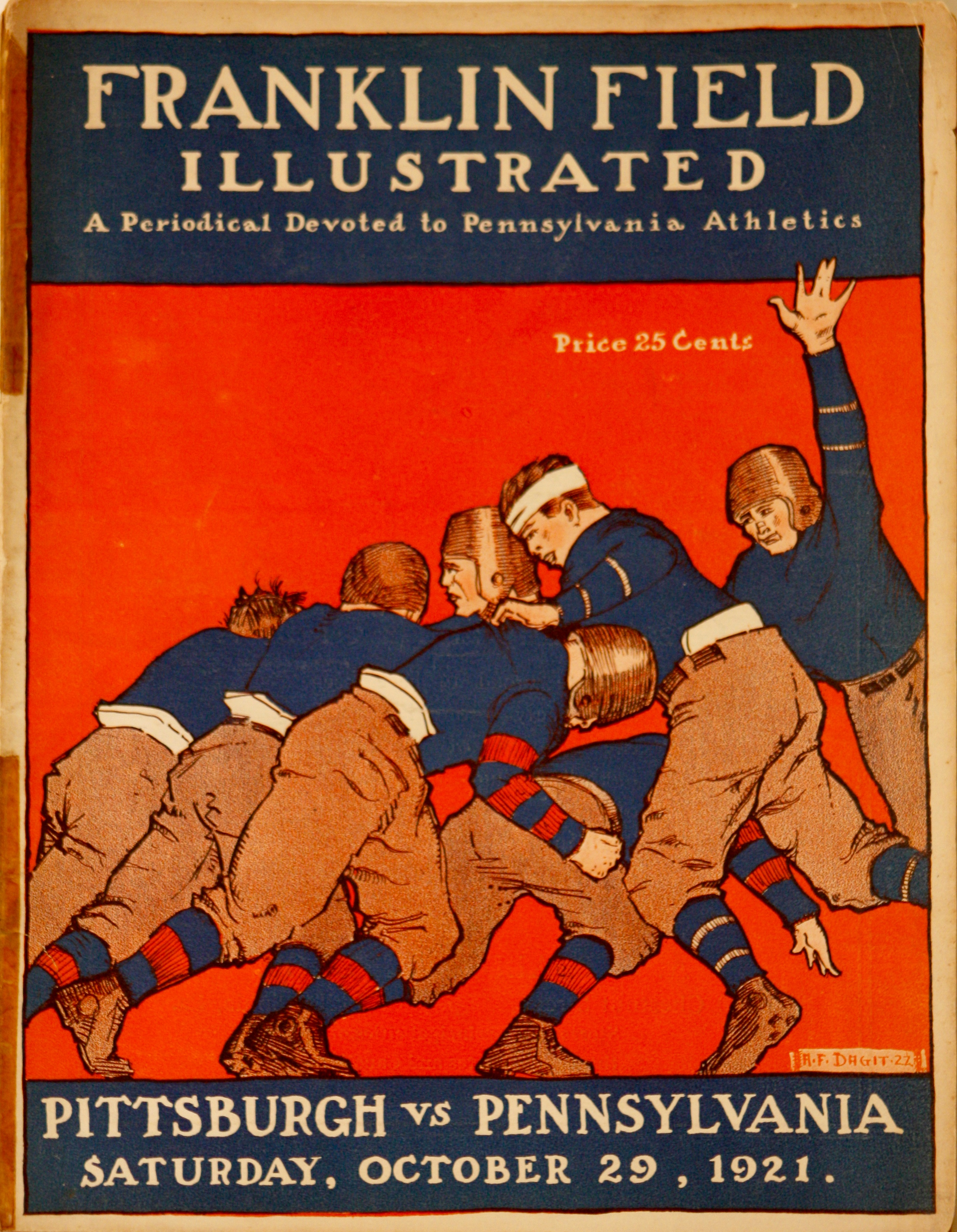
Franklin Field Illustrated for October 29, 1921 Pennsylvania vs. Pitt game

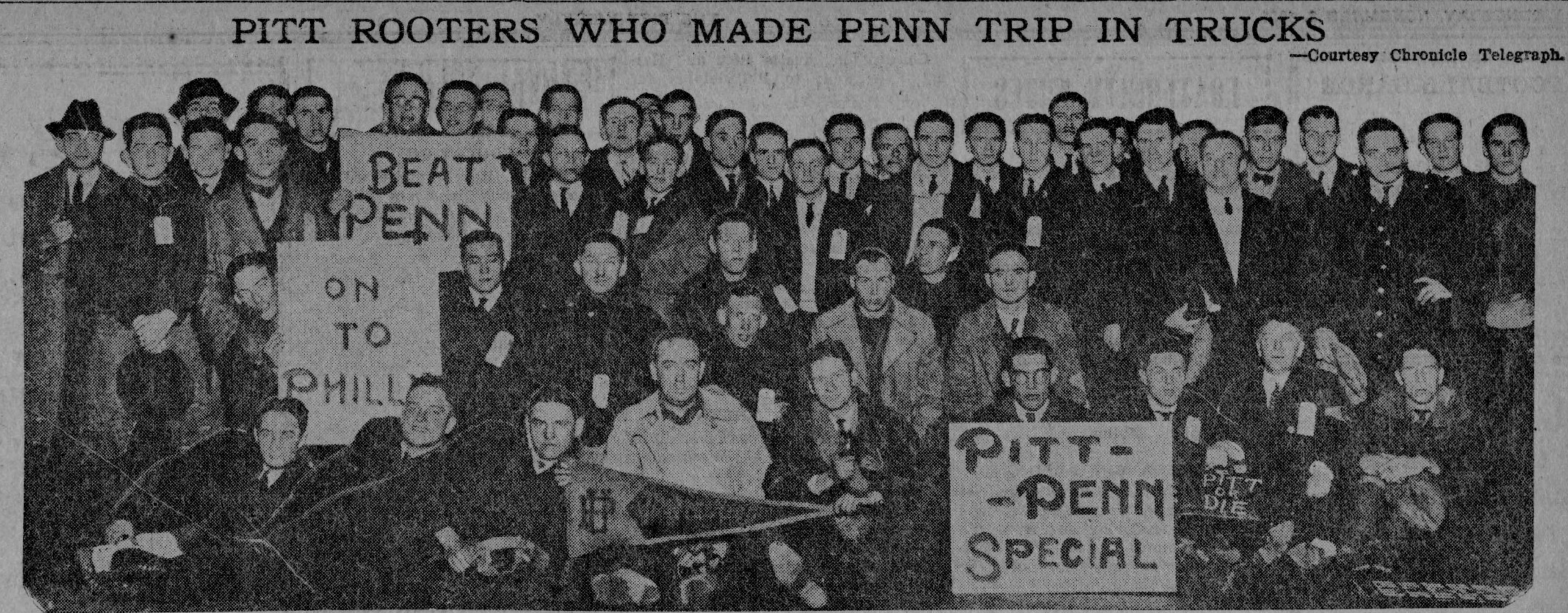
Pitt football fanatics who made the trip to the Penn game

The last road trip for the 1921 season was across the state to Philadelphia for the annual tussle with John Heisman's Penn Quakers. The Quakers' record was 4–0–1, but coach Heisman sequestered his players at Whitemarsh Country Club for secret practice time on Thursday and Friday to prepare for the Pittsburgh eleven. This was the seventh meeting in the series and Penn (0–5–1) had yet to beat the Panthers.

"The Pitt team is in good condition and Warner is confident that his men are properly keyed up, and will exhibit the same fighting spirit they showed against Syracuse."

The Philadelphia Inquirer reported: "The first big game on Penn's football schedule ended in a Red and Blue disaster on Franklin Field yesterday, when the huskies from the University of Pittsburgh rode rough-shod to a 28 to 0 victory. The Red and Blue warriors fought gallantly, but they were outclassed...Pitt's powerful line-smashing backs bowled over the Quakers as though they were pygmies, and there seemed no way in which the flashy Davies and Anderson could be checked in their dashes around the ends. The game was not five minutes old when Pitt fought her way over Penn's goal for the first touchdown after an uninterrupted advance from her 35-yard line after the kick-off. A few minutes afterward the burly Hewitt crashed through for a second touchdown. In the second period the other two scores were made, and each one of the Pitt backs registered one of the touchdowns. The speedy Davies made the first, Hewitt the second, Holleran the third and Anderson the fourth." The Pittsburgh Gazette Times noted: "The score at the end of the first half was the same as the end of the game, 28 to 0. The second half was played of course, but in it Pitt merely went through the motions."

Penn finished the season with a 4–3–2 record.

The Pitt lineup for the game against Penn was Charles Bowser (left end), Harvey Harman (left tackle), Jack Sack (left guard), Herb Stein (center), Harry Seidelson (right guard), Len Kelly (right tackle), Frank Williams (right end), Tom Holleran (quarterback), Tom Davies (left halfback), John Anderson (right halfback) and Orville Hewitt (fullback). Substitutes appearing in the game for Pitt were Lloyd Jordan, Fred Peters, Nick Colonna, Charles Winterburn and Charles Williams. The game was played in 15-minute quarters.

=== Nebraska ===
Week 7: Nebraska at Pitt

Team	1	2	3	4	Total
• Nebraska	0	7	0	3	10
Pitt	0	0	0	0	0

- Date: November 5, 1921
- Location: Forbes Field
  Pittsburgh, PA
- Game start: 2:30 p.m.
- Game attendance: 10,000
- Referee: C. J. McCarty (Germantown)

"Fit physically to the point of perfection," the Nebraska Cornhuskers arrived in the Smokey City to meet the Pitt Panthers for the first time on the gridiron. First year coach Fred Dawson's team had a 3–1 record, the only blemish being a 7 to 0 loss to 1920 National Champ Notre Dame, and the Huskers had outscored their opposition 140–7. The Pittsburgh sportswriters were impressed with the size of the Nebraska linemen. "There are 20 men on the squad who tip the beam at 190 pounds or more. They lay claim to being one of the biggest football aggregations ever assembled on a college gridiron." End Clarence Swanson and guard John Pucelik both gained recognition on the 1921 Walter Camp All-America team. At the train station prior to departing Lincoln, Captain Swanson addressed the student crowd and promised: "We are going into the game to win and will win. The east will recognize us as the 'Fighting Nebraskans'."

The Panthers were physically at a disadvantage. Quarterback Tom Holleran and tackle John McLean did not start. Charles Bowser and Jack Sack, who were injured in the Penn game, were not fully recovered but were in the starting lineup. Coach Warner was not optimistic: "What I fear most is a letdown upon the part of Pitt. I have seen danger signals all week in the listless practice and lack of enthusiasm in the players...I would not be surprised if Pitt suffered a defeat."

Cy Sherman of The Lincoln Sunday Star gloated: "Touted as the 'wonder' team of the eastern realm by virtue of recent triumphs over Syracuse and Penn, the Panthers met their masters in the mighty Cornhuskers, who outplayed, outmaneuvered and outfought the proteges of Coach Glenn Warner whipping them by a much more decisive margin than is indicated by the final count of 10 to 0." Pitt gained 77 yards from scrimmage made three first downs and did not complete a pass. The Huskers gained 308 yards, earned thirteen first downs and gained 76 yards on five pass completions.

Late in the second quarter Nebraska had the ball on their 38-yard line. A line plunge gained one yard. On second down Husker fullback Hartly threw a pass to Swanson. "The ball shot across the field to Swanson and the fast Goliath had a clear field to the goal." Dewitt kicked the goal after and Nebraska led 7–0 at halftime. The final score came late in the game as the Cornhusker offense penetrated deep into Pitt territory for the third time in the fourth quarter. Quarterback Preston booted a dropkick through the uprights from the 10 yard line and Nebraska led 10 to 0.

Coach Warner congratulated the Cornhuskers: "You have a great team Coach Dawson and I congratulate you heartily. Pitt is filing no excuse. You won the game because you deserved to win. Nebraska has the best line, the best backfield and the best coached team Pitt has played this year."

The Pitt lineup for the game against Nebraska was Charles Bowser (left end), Harvey Harman (left tackle), Jack Sack (left guard), Herb Stein (center), Harry Seidelson (right guard), Leon Kelly (right tackle), Frank Williams (right end), Charles Winterburn (quarterback), Tom Davies (left halfback), John Anderson (right halfback) and Orville Hewitt (fullback). Substitutes appearing in the game for Pitt were Fred Ewing, John Clark, Fred Peters, John McLean, Nick Shuler, Tom Holleran, Nick Colonna and Thomas Elias. The game was played in 15-minute quarters.

=== Washington & Jefferson ===
Week 8: Washington & Jefferson at Pitt

Team	1	2	3	4	Total
• W. & J.	0	0	0	7	7
Pitt	0	0	0	0	0

- Date: November 12, 1921
- Location: Forbes Field
  Pittsburgh, PA
- Game start: 2:30 p.m.
- Game attendance: 28,000-30,000
- Game weather: muddy
- Referee: Nathan A. Tufts (Brown)

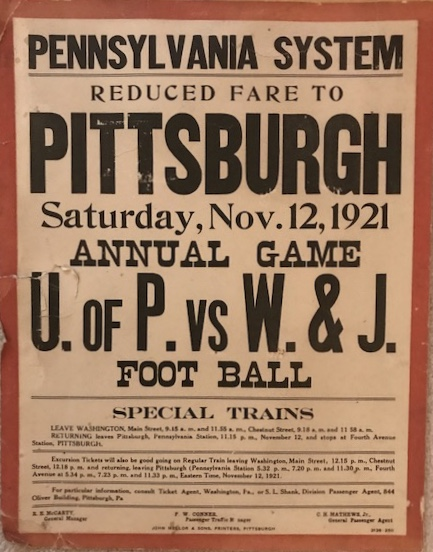
Railroad advertisement for trip to 1921 Pitt versus W. & J. football game

The Washington, PA football fanatics made their annual pilgrimage to the city of Pittsburgh on the November 12 weekend to watch the Pitt vs. W. & J. football game. "While W. & J. will be the 'underdog' in the annual clash, the supporters of the Presidents will be at Forbes Field in the same numbers as in former years filled with the hope that their favorites will be able to arise to the occasion and surprise Warner and his band of Panthers." The Presidents' followers had not gone home happy since 1914. Six straight Pitt victories were in the record books. The 1921 W. & J. team was led by first year coach Greasy Neale and sported an undefeated 7–0 record. Tackle Russ Stein, Herb Stein's brother, anchored their line and was named first team All-America by Walter Camp. "The Red and Black undergrads held a rousing mass rally on the eve of the game, and gave their heroes a terrific sendoff. Coach Neale remarked, 'This is the best exhibition of real college spirit I have ever witnessed. If the team can't fight now, they never will be able to fight. I have every confidence in them and I expect them to beat Pitt Saturday'."

Coach Warner in his weekly article for The Pittsburgh Press emphasized that the Pitt team was physically spent and not in the best shape. He felt that the effort in the Syracuse game needed to be matched against the Presidents to secure a victory. The Pitt lineup was the same that started the Syracuse game except Fred Peters was at left guard in place of the injured Jack Sack.

Max E. Hannum of The Pittsburgh Press reported: "W. & J. tasted Panther meat for the first time in seven years yesterday afternoon at Forbes Field, and the Blue and Gold was trailed in the mud by the score of 7 to 0."

The field was ankle-deep in mud, but Pitt had two first period chances to put points on the board. W. & J. halfback Benkert fumbled a Tom Davies punt and Lloyd Peters recovered on the W. & J. 20-yard line. The Panther offense advanced the ball to the 15-yard line but a forward pass fell incomplete and Pitt lost the ball on downs. A poor punt by Benkert gave Pitt possession on the W. & J. 28-yard line, but the Presidents defense sacked Davies for a 15-yard loss and Pitt chose to punt again. The game remained scoreless until early in the fourth quarter. The W. & J. offense advanced the ball to the Pitt 8-yard line. Pitt tackle Harvey Harman sacked Erickson for a 12-yard loss. On the next play Brenkert passed to W. & J. end Kopf, alone on the 10-yard line, and he carried the ball unmolested into the end zone. Russ Stein kicked goal and W. & J. led 7 to 0.

The victorious Presidents finished the season with a 10–0–1 record, their only blemish being a 0–0 tie with the University of California in the 1922 Rose Bowl.

The Pitt lineup for the game against Washington & Jefferson was Charles Bowser (left end), Harvey Harman (left tackle), Fred Peters (left guard), Herb Stein (center), Harry Seidelson (right guard), John McLean (right tackle), Frank Williams (right end), Tom Holleran (quarterback), Tom Davies (left halfback), John Anderson (right halfback), and Orville Hewitt (fullback). Substitutes entering the game for Pitt were Charles Winterburn, Nick Colonna, Leon Kelly, Fred Ewing, Lloyd Jordan, Mike Hartnett, John Clark, Charles Williams and Edmund Fredette. The game was played in 15-minute quarters.

=== Penn State ===
Week 9: Penn State at Pitt

Team	1	2	3	4	Total
Penn State	0	0	0	0	0
Pitt	0	0	0	0	0

- Date: November 24, 1920
- Location: Forbes Field
  Pittsburgh, PA
- Game start: 2:30 p.m.
- Game attendance: 34,000
- Game weather: rain
- Referee: Robert W. Maxwell (Swarthmore)

Thanksgiving Day 1921 was another exciting chapter in the Pitt versus Penn State football history. "Fans who have been following their contests through the years can recall some sensational incidents, some tough battles and numerous spectacular individual performances." Pitt had just lost two straight games for the first time under head coach Glenn Warner and Penn State was unbeaten and possibly a victory away from an Eastern or National title. Fourth-year coach Hugo Bezdek had the Lions sitting at 7–0–1. Their only blemish was a 21–21 tie with Harvard at Harvard Stadium. The Lions had plenty of talent. Halfback Glenn Killinger was a consensus first team All-America. Fullback Joe Lightner, end Stan McCollum, plus both guards, Ray Baer and Joe Bedenk, were named second team All-America.

Coach Warner took his charges to the Kiski School grounds in Saltsburg, PA for a week of secluded training. The squad came back on Thursday morning, ate lunch in seclusion and went directly to the stadium for the 2:30 kick-off. Four changes were made to the Pitt lineup. Tackle Leon Kelly, fullback Nick Colonna, guard Fred Peters and end Lloyd Jordan were in the starting lineup.

Perry Lewis of The Philadelphia Inquirer waxed poetic:

"The lion of Nittany Mountain, roving the country, seeking whom it might devour, stalked into the rain-soaked lair of the Panther of Pater Pitt this Thanksgiving Day. As the king of the beasts roared its defiance to the football world, the feline of 'Pop' Warner hurled itself upon the invader. In a sea of mud the monarchs of the jungle snarled, tore and ripped at each other, and at the end of an hour of furious action neither had been able to overcome the other. Penn State was unable to score, and so was Pitt, but that grim battle, fought in mire ankle deep, will never be forgotten by the 34,000 football mad fans who braved the elements to seek a seat in the jammed stands."

For the second year in a row the rivalry game ended in a scoreless tie. Pitt, the underdog, outplayed the Lions. Pitt had seven first downs to four for Penn State. Pitt gained 113 yards while State garnered 109. The sportswriters called it a "moral victory" for Pitt, since Penn State had been billed as the greatest team in the country. Perry Lewis summed it up best: "And in this desperate fray Pitt won because it did not lose and Penn State lost because it did not win."

The Pitt lineup for the game against Penn State was Charles Bowser (left end), Harvey Harman (left tackle), Jack Sack (left guard), Herb Stein (center), Fred Peters (right guard), Leon Kelly (right tackle), Lloyd Jordan (right end), Tom Holleran (quarterback), Tom Davies (left halfback), John Anderson (right halfback) and Nick Colonna (fullback). Substitutes appearing in the game for Pitt were Frank Williams, Fred Ewing, Orville Hewitt and Charles Winterburn. The game was played in 15-minute quarters.

== Scoring summary ==
1921 Pittsburgh Panthers scoring summary
Player	Touchdowns	Extra points	Field goals	Safety	Points
Tom Davies	4	9	0	0	33
Orville Hewitt	4	0	0	0	24
Tom Holleran	2	5	0	0	17
J. Charles Winterburn	2	0	0	0	12
Nicolas Colonna	2	0	0	0	12
William Robusch	2	0	0	0	12
Charles Williams	1	4	0	0	10
Nick Shuler	1	1	0	0	7
John Anderson	1	0	0	0	6
Totals	19	19	0	0	133

== Postseason ==
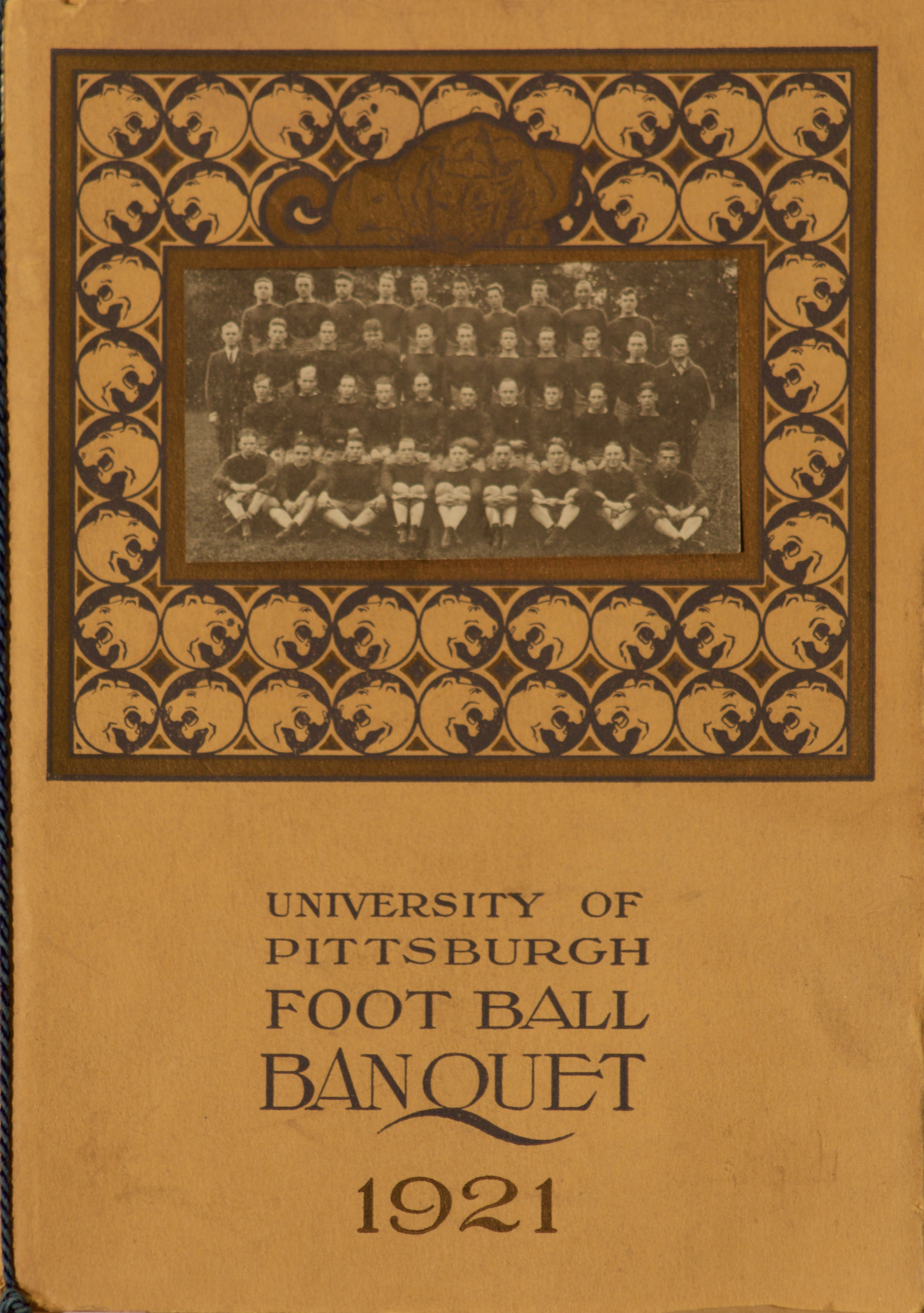
1921 Banquet Program

The 5-3-1 record of the 1921 Panthers was easily the worst in the Warner era. Warner accepted much of the responsibility. " 'I may say that I am to blame more than anyone else,' he told reporters. 'I realize I have become a little careless. We have been winning all along since I came to Pittsburgh. I have not maintained the same discipline and training as in the past. I have been inclined to let the loose ends take care of themselves, to permit players considerable freedom off the field. But believe me, I am going to get down to brass tacks next year and it will be a different story'."

Quarterback Tommy Holleran was elected captain for the 1922 football season at the annual grid banquet on December 2, 1921. The following were awarded varsity football letters: Tom Davies, Jack Sack, John McLean, John Anderson, Lloyd Jordan, John Clark, Charles Winterburn, Mike Hartnett, Charles Bowser, Herb Stein, Frank Williams, Orville Hewitt, Leon Kelly, Edmund Fredette, Charles Williams, Harvey Hartman, Harry Seidelson, Tom Holleran, Fred Ewing, Fred Peters, Nick Shuler and Nick Colonna and Manager Laurence Klinestiver.

Players lost to graduation were John McLean, Fred Peters, John Laughran, Leon Kelly, Harvey Harman, Fred Ewing, Herb Stein and Tom Davies.

George I. Carson was chosen student football manager for the 1922 season. He was a veteran of World War I and a junior in the School of Economics.

=== All-American selections ===
Herb Stein – center (3rd team Walter Camp; 1st team Jack Veiock, International News, sporting editor; 1st team Football World of Columbus, Ohio; 1st team Carl Reed, Eastern Football Official; 1st team Henry L. Farrell, New York; 1st team Billy Evans, Youngstown Daily Vindicator; 1st team Ralph S. Davis, sports editor, The Pittsburgh Press; 1st team Walter Eckersall, Chicago Tribune;)

Tom Davies - halfback (2nd team Walter Camp; 2nd team Football World of Columbus, Ohio; 2nd team Carl A. Reed, Eastern Football Official; 2nd team Billy Evans, Youngstown Daily Vindicator; 3rd team Walter Eckersall, Chicago Tribune))

Tom Holleran – quarterback (Honorable mention Walter Camp)

Orville Hewitt – fullback (Honorable mention Walter Camp)

Outing Magazine ranked 114 players from the 1921 season and four Panthers made their list – center Herb Stein, halfback Tom Davies, tackle Harvey Harman and guard Jack Sack.

Bold = Consensus All-American
