= Hube Wagner =

American football player (1891–1979)

- Wagner playing at Pitt in 1913

Profile
- Position: End

Personal information
- Born: January 5, 1891; Monaca, Pennsylvania, U.S.
- Died: March 1979 (aged 88); Pittsburgh, Pennsylvania, U.S.

Career information
- High school: Monaca (PA)
- College: Pittsburgh

Career history
- Canton Bulldogs (1915)
- College Football Hall of Fame

J. Huber "Hube" Wagner (January 5, 1891 – March 1979) was an American football player who played college football at the University of Pittsburgh from 1910 until 1913 before becoming a prominent surgeon in Pittsburgh, Pennsylvania.

== Formative years ==
While still a student at Monaca High School, Wagner was hailed by the media for being one of Pennsylvania's most versatile football players. He then made the varsity squad as a freshman at the University of Pittsburgh, where he was an end player. That season Pitt posted a 9–0 record. Although Wagner was primarily used as an end at Pitt moving forward, Pitt's coach Joe Thompson developed him into a utility player, using him at every other position except quarterback. In 1913, Wagner captained the Pitt team and received All-American honors.

In 1915, he was recruited by Jack Cusack, the manager of the Canton Bulldogs to play for the Bulldogs against their rivals the Massillon Tigers.

== Medical career ==
After graduation, Wagner became a prominent surgeon in Pittsburgh, treating patients until his retirement in 1975. He also served twelve years on the University of Pittsburgh's board of trustees.

== Awards and other honors ==
Wagner was elected to the College Football Hall of Fame in 1973.
