= Beaver Bridge (Ohio River) =

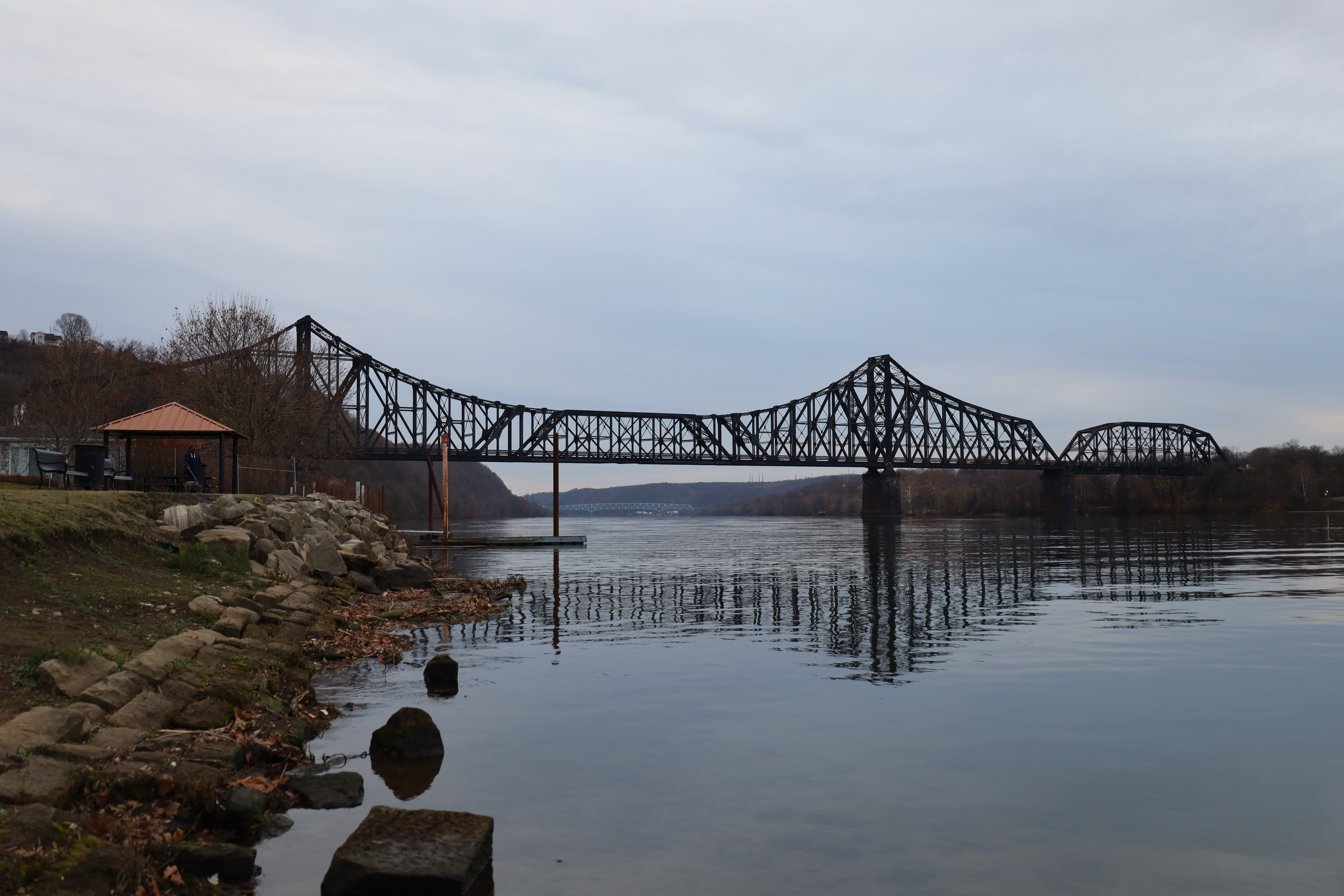
- The bridge in 2025
- Coordinates: 40.692906°N 80.290833°W
- Carries: Two tracks of CSX Transportation.
- Crosses: Ohio River
- Locale: Monaca, Pennsylvania and Beaver, Pennsylvania

Characteristics
- Design: Cantilever through truss bridge

Location
- Interactive map of Beaver Bridge

The Beaver Bridge is a rail bridge spanning the Ohio River between Monaca and Beaver, Pennsylvania. It consists of two spans: a southern cantilever through truss of 769 feet (234 m) with 320-foot (98 m) anchor arms; and a northern camelback through truss of 370 feet (110 m). The bridge currently carries two tracks of CSX Transportation.

== Previous bridges ==
Second Beaver Bridge in 1910

The original bridge at the location was an 1878 wrought iron bridge, 300 feet (91 m) downstream from the current bridge's position. It was replaced by a single-track bridge built in 1890 at that same location.

== Current bridge ==
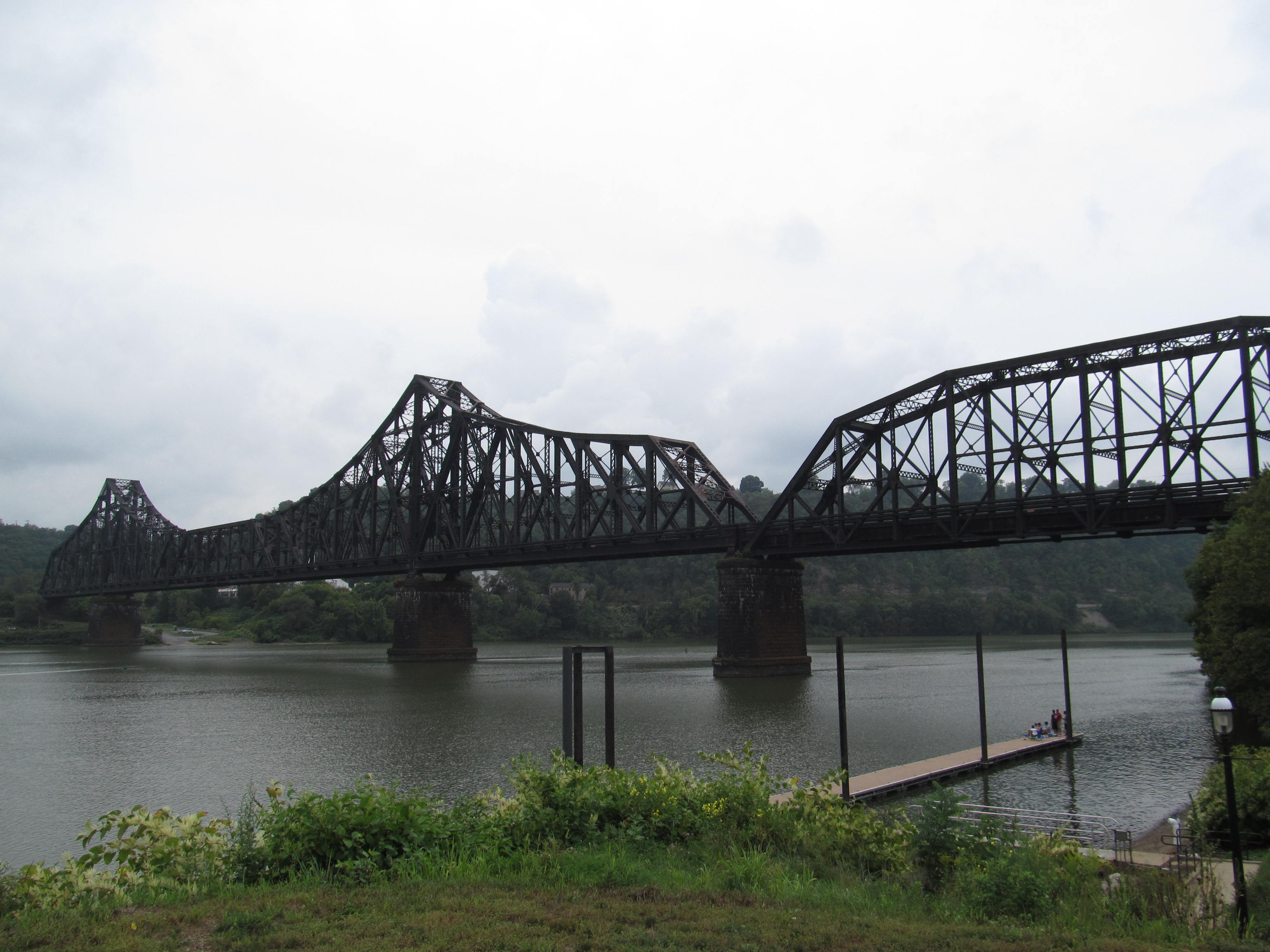
The bridge in 2012

The bridge was designed by Albert Lucius and built by McClintic-Marshall Company of Pittsburgh between March 1908 and May 1910 for the Pittsburgh and Lake Erie Railroad. The bridge is notable in that the railroad proceeded with the cantilever design despite the collapse of the Quebec cantilever bridge during construction in 1907.

== See also ==
- List of bridges documented by the Historic American Engineering Record in Pennsylvania
- List of crossings of the Ohio River
