= Center Area School District =

School district in Pennsylvania, USA

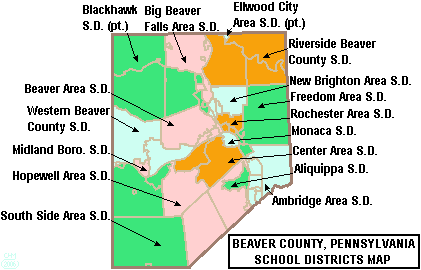

Address
- 160 Baker Road Ext. Monaca, Beaver, Pennsylvania, 15061; United States
- Coordinates: 40.66203°N 80.30430°W

District information
- Type: Public
- Grades: K-12
- Closed: 2009
- Superintendent: Dr. Daniel J. Matsook

Students and staff
- District mascot: Trojans

Other information
- Website: www.casd.k12.pa.us

The Center Area School District was a school district formerly covering Center Township and Potter Township in Beaver County, Pennsylvania. The district formerly operated Center High School, Center Middle School, Todd Lane Elementary School and Center Grange Primary School. In 2009 the district consolidated with the former Monaca School District to form Central Valley School District.
