= Isle of Harris distillery =

Scottish distillery

Isle of Harris Distillery

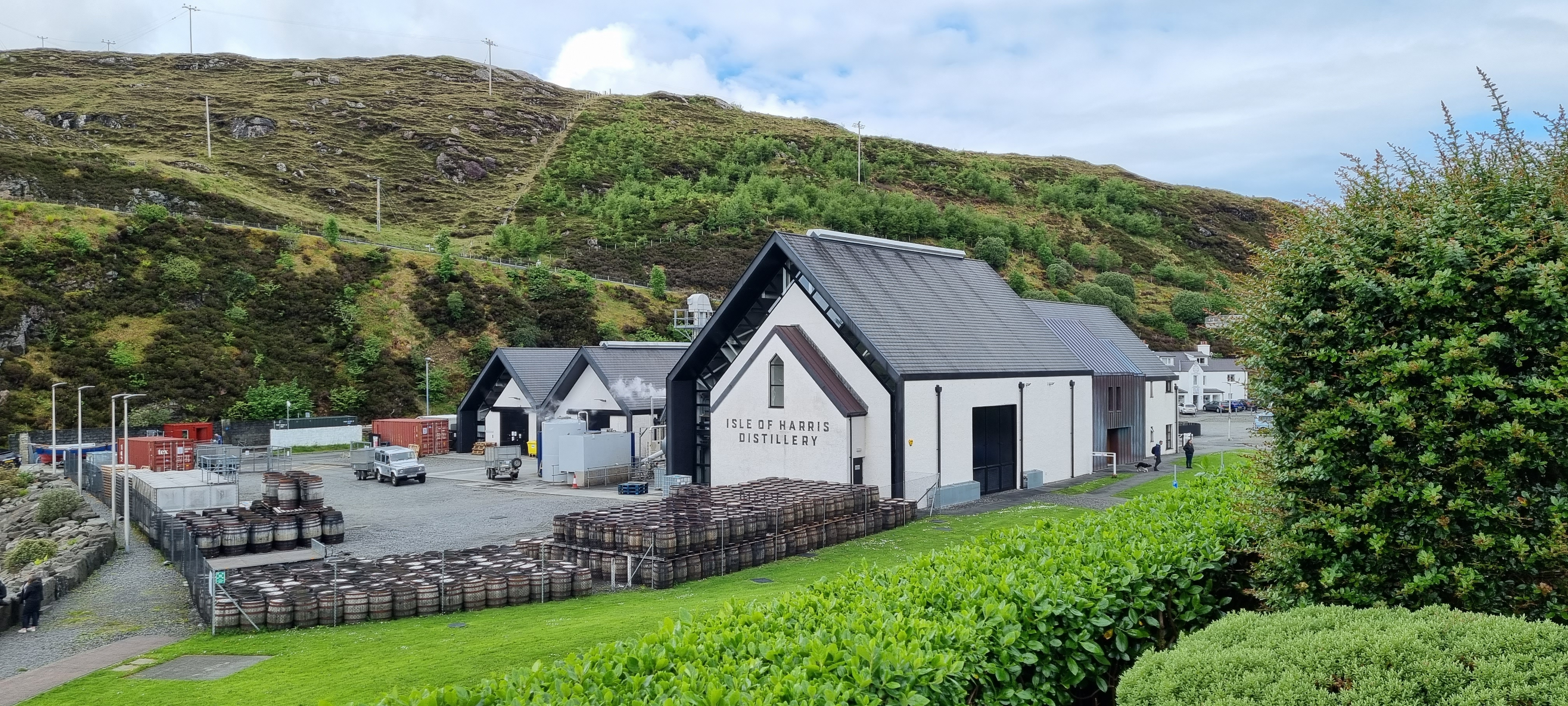

Region: Island
- Location: Tarbet, Isle of Harris HS3 3DJ, Scotland, United Kingdom
- Coordinates: 57.8976°N 6.8040°W
- Owner: Isle of Harris Distillers Ltd
- Founded: 2015; 11 years ago
- Architect: John R. Coleman Architects
- Water source: Abhainn Cnoc a’Charrainn
- No. of stills: 2; 7000 litre wash still 5000 litre spirit still
- Capacity: 230,000 L
- Website: harrisdistillery.com

Isle of Harris Distillery is a Scotch whisky and gin distillery in Tarbert on the Isle of Harris, Scotland. The distillery was the first legal distillery ever built on Harris.

== History ==
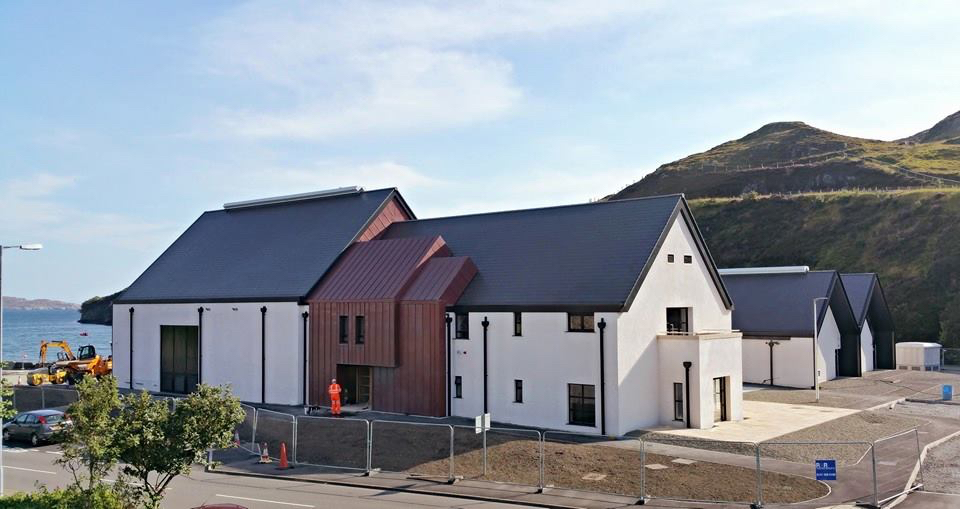
The exterior of the Isle of Harris distillery still under construction in Tarbert, Harris in 2015.

Plans for the distillery began in 2011 with a submission to the Western Isles council, Comhairle nan Eilean Siar. With the support of a £2.8 million combined grant from the Scottish Government and the Highlands and Islands Enterprise fund, and designed by John R. Coleman Architects, building commenced in spring 2014. The total investment for the original project was £10 million, with the remaining funding coming from private sources. The distillery opened in October 2015 and commenced production on 17 December 2015.

In 2016, BBC Alba produced a TV documentary about the first working year of the distillery. By 2017, the distillery had welcomed over 144,000 visitors, including Charles, Prince of Wales, as well as receiving 17 awards for their products.

In 2020, the distillery began sponsoring a virtual Cèilidh. In January 2021, the distillery submitted plans to the Council for expansion, including a new maturation warehouse.

In July 2021, the distillery launched an eco-friendly initiative to refill bottles.

In autumn 2023, the distillery released its first single malt whisky.

== Facilities ==
The distillery stills were made in Siena, Italy by Frilli Impianti. There is a visitor centre.

== Products ==
As well as a single malt whisky called The Hearach, the Gaelic word for a resident of Harris, the distillery makes a gin using botanicals including local sugar kelp seaweed. As of 2017, over two tonnes of seaweed had been collected for the gin production. Other botanicals in the gin include Juniper, Coriander, Angelica Root and Cassia Bark. The gin is sold in a distinctive blue bottle which won a Gold Award at the World Gin Awards in 2021. The gin bottles are manufactured in Yorkshire by the Stölzle Glass Group.
