= Stölzle Glass =

Austrian glassmaking company

Stoelzle Glass Group is an Austrian multinational manufacturer of glassware.

Stoelzle Oberglas logo

== History ==
Karl Smola founded the Oberdorf glassworks in Bärnbach (Styria) on 15 June 1805.

In 1978, Stölzle Glasindustrie AG became Stölzle-Oberglas AC.

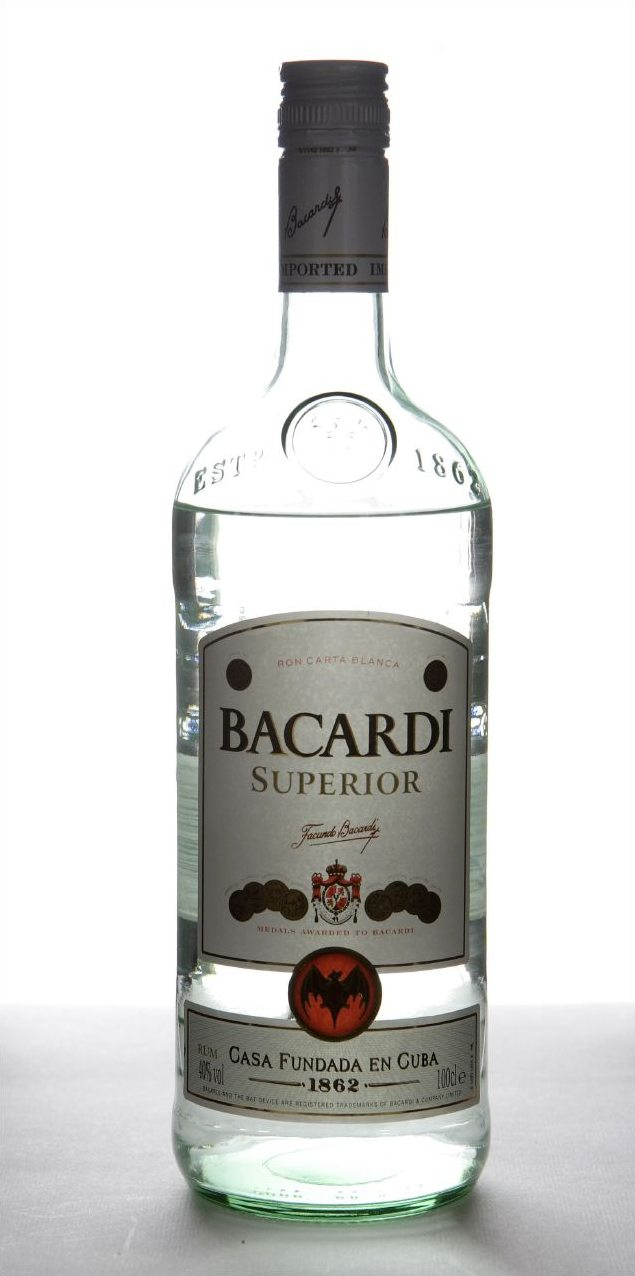
The Yorkshire site makes bottles for Bacardi

== Structure ==
The company is headquartered in Köflach (Styria).

=== United Kingdom ===
Stölzle Flaconnage have a glassmaking site in Knottingley, West Yorkshire, where it has been since 1994 on the A645, and makes glass containers (around 100 million a year) and flint glass. The site had been founded as J.W. Bagley and Co in 1871. The site provides spirit (Scottish whisky) bottles for Diageo and for Isle of Harris distillery. Another site of Bagley became Rockware Glass.

Poland

Stoelzle Flaconnage has a glassmaking site in Polish city of Częstochowa.
