= Monaca School District =

Former school district in Pennsylvania, USA

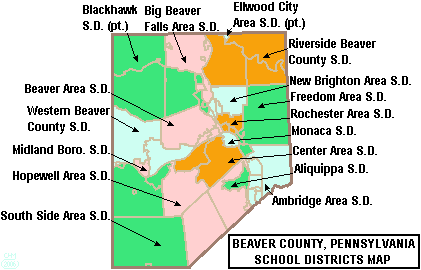
- Map of Beaver County, PA school districts

Location
- Monaca, Beaver, Pennsylvania, 15061; United States

District information
- Type: Public
- Grades: K-12
- Closed: 2009
- Superintendent: Michael Thomas

Other information
- Website: www.monaca.k12.pa.us

The Monaca School District is a defunct school district formerly covering the Borough of Monaca in Beaver County, Pennsylvania. The district operated Monaca Junior/Senior High School and the Monaca High School Elementary Department. In 2009, the district consolidated with the former Center Area School District to form the Central Valley School District.
