= Central Valley School District (Pennsylvania) =

School district in Pennsylvania

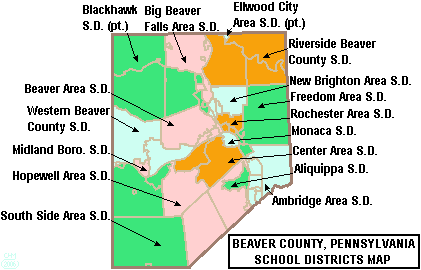
- Map showing the former districts of Center Area and Monaca now constituting Central Valley School District.

Address
- 160 Baker Road Extension Monaca, Pennsylvania, 15061; United States
- Coordinates: 40.660901°N 80.303789°W

District information
- Type: Public
- Grades: Kindergarten-12th
- Established: 2009
- Schools: 5 total: Central Valley High School; Central Valley Middle School; Todd Lane Elementary School; Center Grange Primary School; Central Valley Cyber Academy
- NCES District ID: 4200824

Students and staff
- Students: 2,382
- Teachers: 157
- Staff: 280
- Student–teacher ratio: 15:1
- District mascot: Warriors
- Colors: Carolina Blue; Navy Blue

Other information
- Website: www.centralvalleysd.org

The Central Valley School District (CVSD) was established on July 1, 2009. It comprises the former Center Area and Monaca school districts, and includes the municipalities of Center Township, Potter Township, and Monaca Borough in Beaver County, Pennsylvania. The Central Valley School District represents the first “Voluntary” merger of public school districts in the Commonwealth of Pennsylvania. The merger was a five-year process due to opposition from those who opposed the plan.

Central Valley School District encompasses approximately 23 square miles (60 km^{2}). There are approximately 18,000 residents living throughout the Central Valley School District communities.

Central Valley School District operates four schools: Center Grange Primary School, Todd Lane Elementary School, Central Valley Middle School and Central Valley High School. High school students may choose to attend Beaver County Career and Technology Center for training in the construction and mechanical trades. Beaver Valley Intermediate Unit IU27 provides the district with a wide variety of services like specialized education for disabled students and hearing, speech and visual disability services and professional development for staff and faculty.

== Current Buildings ==
| Building | Grades | Principal |
|---|---|---|
| Central Valley High School | 9-12 | Mr. Shawn McCreary |
| Central Valley Middle School | 6-8 | Mr. Brian Dolph |
| Todd Lane Elementary School | 3-5 | Ms. Christina Faragoti |
| Center Grange Primary School | K-2 | Mrs. Carla Kosanovich, |

== Extracurriculars ==
Central Valley School District offers a wide variety of clubs, activities and an extensive sports program.

=== Sports ===
The district funds:

Varsity

Boys

- Baseball - AAA
- Basketball- AAA
- Bowling - AAAA
- Cross country - AA
- Football - AAA
- Golf - AAA
- Soccer - AA
- Tennis - AA
- Track and field - AAA
- Wrestling - AA
- Swimming - AA

Girls

- Basketball - AAA
- Bowling - AAAA
- Cross country - AA
- Golf - AAA
- Gymnastics - AAAA
- Soccer (Fall) - AA
- Softball - AAA
- Girls' tennis - AA
- Track and field - AAA
- Volleyball - AA
- Swimming - AA

Middle school

Boys

- Baseball
- Basketball
- Football
- Soccer
- Track and field
- Wrestling

Girls

- Basketball
- Soccer (Fall)
- Softball
- Track and field
- Volleyball

According to PIAA directory July 2014
