= List of Muhlenberg College people =

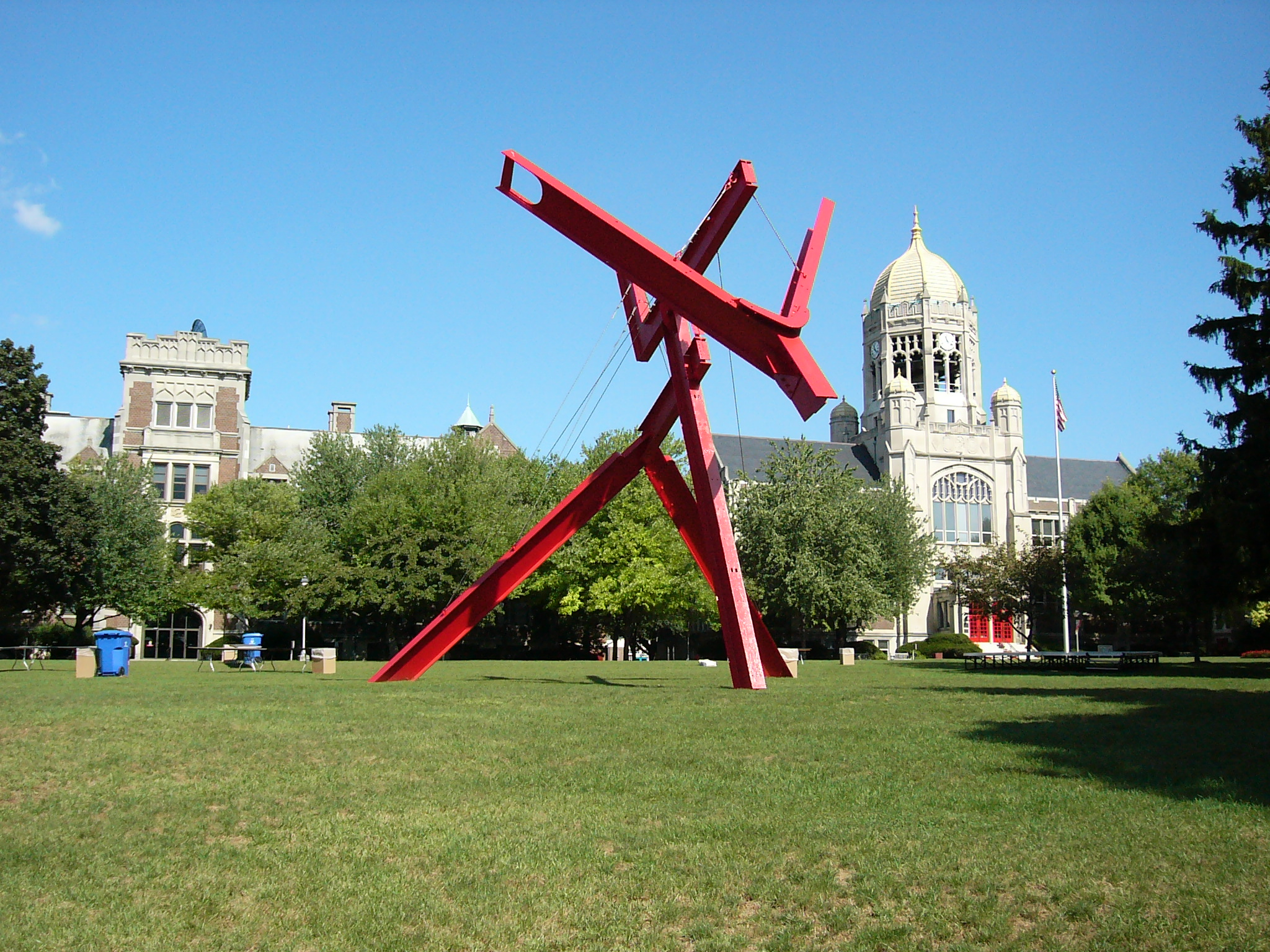
The campus of Muhlenberg College in Allentown, Pennsylvania

Notable alumni of Muhlenberg College in Allentown, Pennsylvania:

== Alumni ==
=== Academia ===
- George O. Bierkoe, former president and co-founder, Endicott College
- Mahlon Hellerich, former historian and president, Pennsylvania German Society
- Amy B. Jordan, professor and chair of journalism and media studies, Rutgers University
- Herbert Needleman, former professor of pediatrics and child psychology, University of Pittsburgh School of Medicine
- Leonard I. Zon, professor of pediatric medicine, Harvard Medical School, investigator at Howard Hughes Medical Institute, and director of the stem cell program at Boston Children's Hospital

=== Arts ===
- Brett Bara, writer, designer, television personality, spokesperson, and consultant
- Frederick Busch, author
- Andrea Clearfield, composer
- Madison Ferris, actress
- Frankie Grande, dancer, singer, actor, producer, TV host, and YouTube personality
- Matthew Hittinger, poet and printmaker
- Sarah Lampert, creator of the Netflix series, Ginny & Georgia
- Jack McCallum, author and sportswriter
- Michael McDonald, costume designer and 2009 Tony Award and Drama Desk nominee for Hair
- Darryl Ponicsan, novelist and screenwriter
- Juliette Reilly, singer/songwriter
- Nisha Sharma, novelist
- Brian Teta, executive producer, The View, and former supervising producer, Late Show with David Letterman
- Theodore Weiss, poet
- Emily Wickersham, actress known for NCIS, dropped out after two years

=== Business ===
- Michael Pocalyko, business executive and novelist

=== Government and law ===
- Richard Ben-Veniste, attorney, lead prosecutor in the Watergate scandal, Democratic counsel in the Whitewater hearings, and member of the 9/11 Commission
- Edward H. Bonekemper, federal government attorney, military historian, author, and lecturer
- Marcus C. L. Kline, U.S. representative for Pennsylvania's 13th congressional district
- Fred Ewing Lewis, U.S. representative
- Edwin W. Martin Jr., assistant secretary of U.S. Department of Education, Special Education and Related Services. 1979–80; associate and deputy commissioner 1969–1979; director of US House of Representatives Subcommittee on the Handicapped, 1966–67
- Michael Schlossberg, member of the Pennsylvania House of Representatives
- John O. Sheatz (did not graduate), former Pennsylvania state representative, state senator, and state treasurer
- John Van Sant, former Pennsylvania state representative and state senator

=== Journalism ===
- Russ Choma, reporter and investigative journalist
- Barbara Crossette, journalist, Mother Jones magazine, and author
- David Fricke, senior editor, Rolling Stone

=== Law ===
- Lee Solomon, justice of the Supreme Court of New Jersey

=== Musicians ===
- Jack O'Brien, jazz musician

=== Religion and theology ===
- Frank Buchman, founder of the Oxford Group, a Christian movement that rose to prominence in Europe and the U.S. in the 1920s and 1930s
- Matthias Loy, Lutheran theologian
- Theodore Emanuel Schmauk, Lutheran minister, theologian, educator and author

=== Science and medicine ===
- Henry David Abraham, psychiatrist and member of International Physicians for the Prevention of Nuclear War (IPPNW); the IPPNW collectively received the 1985 Nobel Peace Prize
- Frank Baldino Jr., scientist and co-founder of Cephalon
- Kenneth N. Beers, NASA flight surgeon
- Lois Curfman McInnes, applied mathematician
- Herbert Needleman, pediatrician known for research into lead poisoning
- Leonard I. Zon, Grousbeck Professor of Pediatric Medicine at Harvard Medical School, investigator at Howard Hughes Medical Institute, and director of the Stem Cell Program at Boston Children's Hospital

=== Sports ===
- Sisto Averno (1925–2012), professional football player, Baltimore Colts (AAFC), New York Yanks, Dallas Texans, Baltimore Colts (NFL)
- Jake Bornheimer, professional basketball player, Philadelphia Warriors
- Harry Donovan, professional basketball player with the New York Knicks
- Larry Friedman, basketball player
- Bill Kern, professional baseball player, Kansas City Athletics
- Tony Zuzzio, professional football player, Detroit Lions
- Matt Yallof, MLB Network personality.

== Faculty and administration ==
=== Faculty ===
- Haps Benfer, theologian and athletic coach
- Cecilia Conrad, academic and foundation administrator
- Francesca Coppa, professor of English, Theatre, and Film Studies
- William Dunham, mathematician
- Margaret Garwood, music composer
- Peyton R. Helm, former Muhlenberg College president (2003–2015)
- Daniel Klem, ornithologist
- J. Christopher Kovats-Bernat, anthropologist
- Ludwig Lenel, composer and organist
- Robert J. Marshall, Lutheran church leader
- Frederick Augustus Muhlenberg, former president, Muhlenberg College (1867–1876)
- Harry Hess Reichard, Pennsylvania German language scholar
- George Rickey, sculptor
- Frederick H. Robinson, baritone and opera director who was the founder of the opera workshop at Muhlenberg College
- Len Roberts, poet
- Theodore Schick, philosopher
- Ben Schwartzwalder, former head football coach, Syracuse University
- Helen Walker-Hill, musicologist
- John Williams, former Muhlenberg College president (2015–2019)

=== Athletic administrators and coaches ===
- George Barclay, football coach (1907)
- Haps Benfer, football, basketball, and baseball coach (1925–1965)
- Sam Bishop, assistant men's soccer coach (2007–08)
- Bennie Borgmann, men's basketball coach (1949–1954)
- Alfred E. Bull, football coach (1903–07)
- Doggie Julian, football coach (1936–1944) and baseball coach (1942–1944)
- Thomas Kelley, football coach (1911–13) and men's basketball coach (1912–1914)
- Bob Macaluso, baseball coach (1999–2006)
- George McCaa, football coach (1914–1915), men's basketball coach (1914–1917), and baseball coach (1914–1915)
- Nate Milne, head football coach (2018–present)
- Steve Moore, men's basketball coach (1981–87)
- John B. Price, football and baseball coach (1916–1917)
- Larry Rosati, football coach (1945)
- Johnny Spiegel, football coach (1921–22)
- John Troxell, assistant football coach (1997–2000)
- John Utz, football coach (1934–35), men's basketball coach (1933–36), and baseball coach (1934–35)
- Walter W. Wood, football, men's basketball, and baseball coach (1923–24)
