= Greg Olejack =

American football coach (1955–2025)

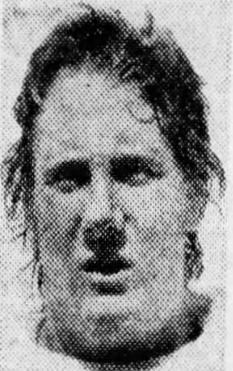
- Olejack in 1975

Biographical details
- Born: February 20, 1955; Whitehall Township, Pennsylvania, U.S.
- Died: April 24, 2025 (aged 70); Marietta, Georgia, U.S.
- Education: University of Louisville (1976); Tulane University (1983)

Playing career
- 1973–1974: New Mexico Military
- 1975–1976: Louisville
- Position: Center

Coaching career (HC unless noted)
- 1978: Clarksville HS (IN) (OL)
- 1979–1980: Garden City (DL)
- 1981–1983: Tulane (assistant)
- 1984–1987: Villanova (OL)
- 1988: Villanova (OC/OL)
- 1990: Brown (RB)
- 1991–1993: Richmond (OL)
- 1994–1996: Muhlenberg
- 1997–1998: Hawaii (OL)
- 2000 (spring): Southeast Missouri State (OL)
- 2000–2008: Kansas City Chiefs (scout)

Head coaching record
- Overall: 3–26–1

Gregory J. Olejack (February 20, 1955 – April 24, 2025) was an American college football coach and professional scout. He was the head football coach for Muhlenberg College from 1994 to 1996.

== Early life and playing career ==
Olejack was born on February 20, 1955, in Whitehall Township, Pennsylvania. He grew up in Fullerton, Pennsylvania, and played little league (knee-hi) football in the Lehigh Valley Conference (LVC). In 1968, he earned the conference's co-MVP honor at a conference held in the Northampton Liederkranz in Northampton, Pennsylvania.

Olejack went on to enroll at Whitehall High School. He played as a center. After his senior year, he was chosen to play in the third-annual LARC football game, which was held yearly as high school players in Pennsylvania competed in a charity all-star game. Olejack was not heavily recruited out of high school, causing him to commit to play junior college football for New Mexico Military Institute.

After two years with New Mexico Military, Olejack transferred to Louisville under head coach Vince Gibson. It took Olejack one week to earn the team's starting position at center. At Louisville, Olejack played against former Whitehall teammate, and life-long friend, Ron Gumhold, who was now a defensive tackle for Chattanooga, who played in week five. The reunion game ended as Louisville's only win of the season. In 1976, Olejack suffered a knee injury during the team's spring Red and White game. He healed before the season began and started every game of the season, just as he had done the season prior.

== Coaching career ==
Olejack began his coaching career as the offensive line coach for Clarksville Senior High School in Clarksville, Indiana. After one season, he jumped to the junior college ranks as the defensive line coach for Garden City under the former head coach at New Mexico Military and assistant coach at Louisville, Ray Sewalt. Alongside coaching football, Olejack served as a resident supervisor for the college.

Olejack left Garden City in 1981 and was an assistant for Tulane from 1981 to 1983. In 1984, he was hired as the offensive line coach and helped head coach Andy Talley restart the Villanova football team. In 1988, Olejack was promoted to offensive coordinator. He resigned after the 1988 season to enter private business.

Olejack returned to coaching in 1990 as the running backs coach for Brown. He spent one season with the team before joining Richmond as the team's offensive line coach. With Richmond, the team ran, and excelled, with the option offense.

On January 27, 1994, Olejack was officially announced as the 27th head football coach for Muhlenberg College. He was attracted to the Muhlenberg job due to the college's "sincere concern for the student athlete" and "the quality of players I have met impressed me and the campus itself is a great sell for recruits." He took over for Fran Meagher who led the team to four-straight losing seasons, the program's first in nearly four decades, and an overall record of 10–28–1. In Olejack's debut season, the team finished with an overall record of 2–8, despite the poor record, he received praise for continuing to lead the team through mass amounts of injuries. The team began the season to 2–1 before losing the remaining seven games, including a game against rival Moravian, who Muhlenberg had not beaten since 1987. In 1995, Muhlenberg started three different starting quarterbacks, all of which making their debut before week six as the team's quarterbacks dealt with injuries and poor performance. Olejack finished his second season with the team going winless with a 0–9–1 record. He finished his third and final season with a 1–9 record including a 27–3 loss to Moravian in the team's last game. He finished his tenure with the Mules with an overall record of 3–26–1. He holds the second-worst winning percentage of all Muhlenberg football coaches with a .117 winning percentage, just ahead of Larry Rosati who lost all five of his games in his lone season.

In 1997, Olejack was hired as the offensive line coach for Hawaii. He spent two seasons with the team. In 2000, he was hired as the offensive line coach for Southeast Missouri State on the inaugural staff of Tim Billings. Olejack resigned before the start of the season to become a scout for the Kansas City Chiefs of the National Football League (NFL). He held the position until at least 2008.

== Personal life and death ==
Olejack married Meg Lovell, an elementary teacher at Lincoln Elementary School in Garden City, Kansas, on July 20, 1979, at St. Elizabeth's Church in Whitehall Township, Pennsylvania. After the pairs wedding, they drove through the Pocono Mountains. Olejack died in Marietta, Georgia on April 24, 2025, at the age of 70.

== Head coaching record ==
Year	Team	Overall	Conference	Standing	Bowl/playoffs
Muhlenberg Mules (Centennial Conference) (1994–1996)
1994	Muhlenberg	2–8	1–6	7th	
1995	Muhlenberg	0–9–1	0–6–1	8th	
1996	Muhlenberg	1–9	1–6	7th	
Muhlenberg:		3–26–1	2–18–1		
Total:		3–26–1			
