= Howard Baughman =

American football coach

Biographical details
- Born: January 27, 1911; Ashtabula County, Ohio, U.S.
- Died: November 17, 2000 (aged 89); Hamilton County, Ohio, U.S.
- Education: Kent State University

Coaching career (HC unless noted)

Football
- 1938–1939: Bremen HS (OH)
- 1940–1943: Harvey HS (OH)
- 1944–1948: Cleveland Heights HS (OH)
- 1949–1950: Muhlenberg
- 1951–1954: Lincoln HS (OH)
- 1955–1961: Portsmouth HS (OH)

Men's basketball
- 1938–1940: Bremen HS (OH)
- 1942–1944: Harvey HS (OH)
- 1946–1947: John Carroll

Administrative career (AD unless noted)
- 1942–1944: Harvey HS (OH)
- 1955–1962: Portsmouth HS (OH)

Head coaching record
- Overall: 127–67–4 (High school football); 4–11–2 (College football); 58–11 (High school basketball); 9–11 (College basketball)

Accomplishments and honors

Championships
- Football; Lake Shore League (1941); Lake Erie League (1945); Basketball; 2 Lake Shore League (1942–43, 1943–44)

Howard Wesley Baughman (January 27, 1911 – November 17, 2000) was an American football coach who was a high school football coach in Ohio and spent two seasons as the head football coach at Muhlenberg College.

== Early life ==
Baughman grew up in Ashtabula, Ohio. He was a three-sport letter winner at Ashtabula High School and was All-Lake Shore League in football and basketball. He played football, baseball, and basketball for the Kent State Golden Flashes and graduated from Kent State University in 1938.

== Coaching ==
Baughman began his coaching career in 1938 at Bremen High School in Bremen, Ohio. In his two seasons at BHS, Baughman's football teams compiled a 14–4 record and his basketball teams went 28–5. In 1940, he became the head football coach at Thomas W. Harvey High School in Painesville, Ohio. He compiled a 25–6–4 record in four seasons and led the Red Raiders to a Lake Shore League championship in 1941. In 1942, he took over the basketball team and in his first season, the Red Raiders went 14–5 and won the Lake Shore League Championship. The team went undefeated in the regular season the following year and repeated as league champions. He also served as athletic director during his final two years at Harvey High School.

In 1944, Baughman became the head football coach at Cleveland Heights High School. Here he compiled a 38–7 record and led Cleveland Heights to the 1945 Lake Erie League championship. He also coached the John Carroll University men's basketball team during the 1946–47 season.

In 1949, Baughman was named head coach of the Muhlenberg Mules football team. He succeeded Ben Schwartzwalder, who took the head coaching job at Syracuse University. Muhlenberg went 4–11–2 in its two seasons under Baughman. One of his players, Sisto Averno, went on to play in the National Football League.

In 1951, Baughman returned to high school football at Lincoln High School in Canton, Ohio. Four years later, citing his desire to no longer play "second fiddle" to Canton McKinley High School, he took the head coaching job at Portsmouth High School in Portsmouth, Ohio. The move reunited him with H. W. McKelvey, Portsmouth's superintendent who was principal of Harvey High School when Baughman coached there. Baughman posted only two winning seasons at PHS (6–3 in 1957 and 7–2 in 1958) and when his contract was up for renewal in 1961, many opponents and supporters appeared before the school board, which ultimately decided to give him a two-year extension. Later that year, Baughman and McKelvey filed a complaint with the Ohio High School Athletic Association after two Portsmouth players, James and Larry Austin, joined the Canton McKinley football team. An investigation by the OHSAA resulted in the cancelation of Canton McKinley's 1962 season and the Austin brothers being ruled permanently ineligible to play football for CMHS. Portsmouth finished 1961 with a 3–7 record and Baughman was hanged in effigy several times during the season. He resigned at the conclusion of the school year to take a teaching position at Mentor High School.

== Personal life ==
On December 31, 1933, Baughman married Julia Cooper in Ashtabula. They had two daughters. Julia Baughman died on October 31, 1996, in Cincinnati. Baughman died four years later.
