= 1921 Franklin & Marshall Nevonians football team =

American college football season

1921 Franklin & Marshall Nevonians football
- Conference: Independent
- Record: 6–1–2
- Head coach: John B. Price (2nd season)
- Captain: Levi Gilbert

1921 Eastern college football independents records
	Conf.			Overall
Team	W	L	T	W		L		T
Washington & Jefferson		–		10	–	0	–	1
Lafayette		–		9	–	0	–	0
Cornell		–		8	–	0	–	0
Penn State		–		8	–	0	–	2
Yale		–		8	–	1	–	0
New Hampshire		–		8	–	1	–	1
Franklin & Marshall		–		6	–	1	–	2
Villanova		–		6	–	1	–	2
Carnegie Tech		–		7	–	2	–	0
Syracuse		–		7	–	2	–	0
Harvard		–		7	–	2	–	1
Boston University		–		6	–	2	–	0
Dartmouth		–		6	–	2	–	1
Brown		–		5	–	3	–	1
Bucknell		–		5	–	3	–	1
Geneva		–		5	–	3	–	1
Pittsburgh		–		5	–	3	–	1
Holy Cross		–		5	–	3	–	0
Army		–		6	–	4	–	0
Princeton		–		4	–	3	–	0
Boston College		–		4	–	3	–	1
Fordham		–		4	–	3	–	2
Penn		–		4	–	3	–	2
Colgate		–		4	–	4	–	2
Lehigh		–		4	–	4	–	0
Springfield		–		4	–	5	–	2
Vermont		–		3	–	4	–	0
NYU		–		2	–	3	–	3
Buffalo		–		2	–	3	–	2
Drexel		–		2	–	3	–	1
Rutgers		–		4	–	6	–	0
Rhode Island State		–		3	–	5	–	0
Columbia		–		2	–	6	–	0
Tufts		–		1	–	5	–	2
Duquesne		–		0	–	4	–	1

The 1921 Franklin & Marshall Nevonians football team was an American football team that represented Franklin & Marshall College as an independent during the 1921 college football season. In its second year under head coach John B. Price, the team compiled a 6–1–2 record and outscored opponents by a total of 166 to 48. Senior Levi Gilbert was the team captain.

== Schedule ==
Date	Opponent	Site	Result	Source
September 24	Albright	Lancaster, PA	W 7–0	
October 1	at Penn	Franklin Field; Philadelphia, PA	L 0–20	
October 8	Gallaudet	Lancaster, PA	W 14–0	
October 15	at Haverford	Haverford, PA	W 35–0	
October 22	at Swarthmore	Swarthmore, PA (rivalry)	T 7–7	
October 29	Pennsylvania Military	Lancaster, PA	W 41–14	
November 5	Dickinson	Lancaster, PA (rivalry)	W 21–7	
November 12	Ursinus	Lancaster, PA	W 41–0	
November 24	Gettysburg	Lancaster, PA (rivalry)	T 0–0	
