= Sam Bishop =

American soccer player (born 1983)

Personal information
- Full name: Samuel Nepean Bishop
- Date of birth: March 1, 1983 (age 43)
- Place of birth: Moorestown Township, New Jersey, U.S.
- Height: 6 ft 2 in (1.88 m)
- Position: Goalkeeper

College career
Years	Team	Apps	(Gls)
2001–2004	Lehigh Mountain Hawks		

Senior career*
Years	Team	Apps	(Gls)
2005–2007	Harrisburg City Islanders	6	(0)
2008–2009	Pennsylvania Stoners	23	
2010	FC Sonic Lehigh Valley	12	
2012–2014	Harrisburg Heat (indoor)	12	(0)

Managerial career
- 2007–2008: Muhlenberg Mules (assistant)
- 2008–2009: Pennsylvania Stoners (assistant)
- 2009: Lehigh Mountain Hawks (assistant)
- * Club domestic league appearances and goals as of November 29, 2006

Sam Bishop (born March 1, 1983) is an American former professional soccer player who played as a goalkeeper.

Bishop grew up in Moorestown Township, New Jersey, and attended Lehigh University, playing on the men's soccer team from 2001 to 2004. After graduating in 2005, he signed with the Harrisburg City Islanders in the USL Second Division. In 2007, he was part of the Islanders USL-2 championship team. In 2008, he moved to the expansion Pennsylvania Stoners as a player and assistant coach. In 2008, he also became an assistant coach with the NCAA Division III Muhlenberg College soccer team. In 2009, Bishop returned to his alma mater, Lehigh University, and acted as the goalkeeper coach.
