= John B. Price =

American physician

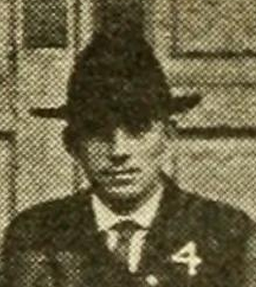
- Price pictured c. 1920 coaching at Franklin & Marshall

Biographical details
- Born: September 13, 1883; St. Clair, Pennsylvania, U.S.
- Died: May 11, 1952 (aged 68); Norristown, Pennsylvania, U.S.
- Education: Ursinus College

Coaching career (HC unless noted)

Football
- 1906–1907: Slippery Rock
- 1908–1913: Ursinus
- 1914–1915: Trinity (CT)
- 1916–1917: Muhlenberg
- 1920–1923: Franklin & Marshall

Baseball
- 1909–1913: Ursinus
- 1915–1916: Trinity (CT)
- 1921–1923: Franklin & Marshall

Head coaching record
- Overall: 69–40–15 (football)

John Beadle Price (September 13, 1883 – May 11, 1952) was an American football and baseball coach and physician. He served as the head football coach at Slippery Rock State Normal School—now known as Slippery Rock University of Pennsylvania—from 1906 to 1907, Ursinus College in Collegeville, Pennsylvania from 1908 to 1913, Trinity College in Hartford, Connecticut from 1914 to 1915, Muhlenberg College in Allentown, Pennsylvania from 1916 to 1917, and Franklin & Marshall College in Lancaster, Pennsylvania from 1920 to 1923, compiling a career college football coaching record of 69–40–15.

== Early life, playing career, education, and military service ==
A native of St. Clair, Pennsylvania, Price attended Ursinus College in Collegeville, Pennsylvania, where he captained the football and baseball teams before graduating in 1905. Price earned a medical degree from the Medico-Chirurgical College of Philadelphia in 1914 and did postgraduate work at Harvard Medical School and the New York Eye and Ear Infirmary. During World War I, he served a captain in the Medical Corps of the United States Army with the rank of captain.

== Coaching career ==
=== Muhlenberg ===
Price was the football and baseball coach at Muhlenberg College in Allentown, Pennsylvania. He coached the football team for the 1916 and 1917 seasons, amassing a record of 9–4–3.

=== Franklin & Marshall ===
Price served as the head football coach at Franklin & Marshall College in Lancaster, Pennsylvania for four seasons, from 1920 to 1923, compiling a record of 20–10–5. While at Franklin & Marshall, Price coached future head coach Jonathan K. Miller.

== Medical career and death ==
Price practiced medicine for 35 years as an ear, nose, and throat specialist. He was on staff at Graduate Hospital in Philadelphia and Montgomery Hospital in Norristown, Pennsylvania. He died on May 11, 1952, at his home in Norristown, following a week-long illness.

== Head coaching record ==
Year	Team	Overall	Conference	Standing	Bowl/playoffs
Slippery Rock (Independent) (1906–1907)
1906	Slippery Rock	3–1–1			
1907	Slippery Rock	2–2–1			
Slippery Rock:		5–3–2			
Ursinus (Independent) (1908–1913)
1908	Ursinus	7–3			
1909	Ursinus	6–1–1			
1910	Ursinus	6–1			
1911	Ursinus	3–4–1			
1912	Ursinus	3–6			
1913	Ursinus	0–6			
Ursinus:		25–21–2			
Trinity Bantams (Independent) (1914–1915)
1914	Trinity	4–2–1			
1915	Trinity	5–0–2			
Trinity:		9–2–3			
Muhlenberg Cardinal and Grey (Independent) (1916–1917)
1916	Muhlenberg	5–3–1			
1917	Muhlenberg	5–1–2			
Muhlenberg:		10–4–3			
Franklin & Marshall (Independent) (1920–1923)
1920	Franklin & Marshall	3–2–2			
1921	Franklin & Marshall	6–1–2			
1922	Franklin & Marshall	8–2			
1923	Franklin & Marshall	3–5–1			
Franklin & Marshall:		20–10–5			
Total:		69–40–15			
