= Muhlenberg Mules football =

College football team

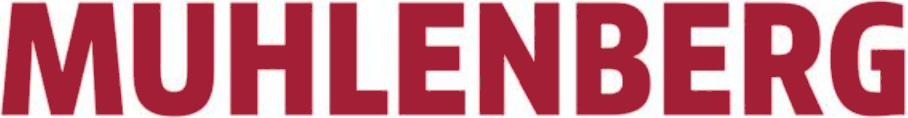
- First season: 1900; 126 years ago
- Athletic director: Lynn Tubman
- Head coach: Nate Milne; 7th season, 69–16 (.812)
- Location: Allentown, Pennsylvania, U.S.
- Stadium: Scotty Wood Stadium (capacity: 3,000)
- NCAA division: Division III
- Conference: Centennial
- Colors: Red and gray
- All-time record: 597–522–41 (.532)

Conference championships
- 18
- Rivalries: Moravian
- Mascot: Mule
- Website: muhlenbergsports.com

The Muhlenberg Mules football team represents Muhlenberg College in college football at the NCAA Division III level. The team, known as the Muhlenberg Mules, have been members of the Centennial Conference since 1983. The Mules play their home games at Scotty Wood Stadium in Allentown, Pennsylvania. The Muhlenberg Mules football program was founded in 1900.

The team's current head coach is Nate Milne, who took over the position beginning in the 2018 season.

Muhlenberg was known as the Cardinal and Grey until 1923, Cardinals from 1924 to 1928, and Mules 1929 onward.

== History ==
=== 1900 to 1945 ===
In 1900, Muhlenberg launched its football program, which was the college's first varsity sport. In 1925, Haps Benfer became Muhlenberg head football coach, and the team finished the 1925 season 6-3-1.

From 1936 to 1945, Doggie Julian was head coach. He recorded a career record of 56–49–2. Julian was also head basketball coach during this time and, from 1942 to 1944, head baseball coach.

=== 1946 to 1997 ===
In 1946, Ben Schwartzwalder became head football coach. In his first season, he guided the Mules to a 9–1 record and a national championship with Muhlenberg defeating St. Bonaventure University in the Tobacco Bowl. The following year, in the 1947 season, Schwartzwalder again led the Mules to a 9–1 record; the season's only loss came by one point, in a 7–6 loss at Temple. The Mules declined an invitation that season to appear in the Tangerine Bowl. In 1949, Schwartzwalder departed to coach Syracuse.

=== 1997 to 2018 ===
Mike Donnelly became the head football coach in 1997. Despite a 1–9 inaugural season, Donnelly turned the team around; from 2000 to 2004, the Mules won five straight Centennial Conference championships and earned five straight postseason berths. In 2007, the Mules again won the Centennial Conference and received another berth in the NCAA playoffs, winning their first-round game before falling in the second round. Donnelly's team won the Centennial Conference again in 2008 and earned a playoff berth, but lost in the playoff's first round. In 2010, they returned to the playoffs with the same result.

Since the 2000 season, Muhlenberg has compiled a 66–28 overall record in the Centennial Conference, second best among all active and former members behind only Johns Hopkins University. Seven times in the 2000s, the Muhlenberg football team won the Centennial Conference championship.

=== 2018 to present ===
Nate Milne became Muhlenberg's head football coach in the 2018 season. He has a 35–5 record over his first three seasons. In 2019, he was named AFCA Coach of the Year Award for NCAA Division III.

== Conference affiliation ==
- Independent (1900–1925)
- Eastern Pennsylvania Collegiate Conference (1926–1942)
- Independent (1943–1957)
- Middle Atlantic Conferences (1958–1982)
- Centennial Conference (1983–present)

== Former NFL players ==
Since the start of the Muhlenberg football program in 1900, at least three Muhlenberg players have gone on to play in the National Football League:

- Sisto Averno, 1950 to 1954 with the Baltimore Colts, Dallas Texans, and New York Yanks
- Charlie Copley, 1920 to 1922 with the Akron Pros and Milwaukee Badgers
- Tony Zuzzio, 1942, Detroit Lions

== List of head coaches ==
Key to symbols in coaches list
General		Overall		Conference		Postseason (Note: Although the first Rose Bowl Game was played in 1902, it has been continuously played since the 1916 game, and is recognized as the oldest bowl game by the NCAA. "—" indicates any season prior to 1916 when postseason games were not played.)	
No.	Order of coaches (Note: A running total of the number of head coaches, with coaches who served separate tenures being counted only once. Interim head coaches are represented with "Int" and are not counted in the running total. "—" indicates the team played but either without a coach or no coach is on record. "X" indicates an interim year without play.)	GC	Games coached	CW	Conference wins	PW	Postseason wins
DC	Division championships	OW	Overall wins	CL	Conference losses	PL	Postseason losses
CC	Conference championships	OL	Overall losses	CT	Conference ties	PT	Postseason ties
NC	National championships	OT	Overall ties (Note: Overtime rules in college football were introduced in 1996, making ties impossible in the period since.)	C%	Conference winning percentage		
†	Elected to the College Football Hall of Fame	O%	Overall winning percentage (Note: When computing the win–loss percentage, a tie counts as half a win and half a loss.)				

=== Coaches ===
List of head football coaches showing season(s) coached, overall records, conference records, postseason records, championships and selected awards
No.	Name	Season(s)	GC	OW	OL	OT	O%	CW	CL	CT	C%	PW	PL	PT	CC
1	Charles Schmidt	1900	5	1	3	1	.300	–	–	–	–	–	–	–	–
2	Walter Beck	1901	4	1	2	1	.375	–	–	–	–	–	–	–	–
3	William Grey	1902	7	0	4	3	.214	–	–	–	–	–	–	–	–
4	Walter Singmaster	1905	6	2	3	1	.417	–	–	–	–	–	–	–	–
5	Alfred Raub	1906	9	5	4	0	.556	–	–	–	–	–	–	–	–
6	George Barclay	1907	10	7	3	0	.700	–	–	–	–	–	–	–	–
7	Alfred E. Bull	1908–1910	24	8	12	4	.417	–	–	–	–	–	–	–	–
8	Thomas Kelley	1911–1913	27	17	9	1	.648	–	–	–	–	–	–	–	–
9	George McCaa	1914–1915	19	6	11	2	.368	–	–	–	–	–	–	–	–
10	John B. Price	1916–1917	17	10	4	3	.676	–	–	–	–	–	–	–	–
11	Guy Brubaker	1918	5	3	2	0	.600	–	–	–	–	–	–	–	–
12	Bill Ritter	1919–1920	18	6	11	1	.361	–	–	–	–	–	–	–	–
13	Johnny Spiegel	1921–1922	21	11	8	2	.571	–	–	–	–	–	–	–	–
14	Walter W. Wood	1923–1924	20	10	9	1	.525	–	–	–	–	–	–	–	–
15	Haps Benfer	1925–1928	38	19	18	1	.513	6	5	0	.545	–	–	–	1
16	George Holstrom	1929–1933	48	20	25	3	.448	8	10	2	.450	–	–	–	2
17	John Utz	1934–1935	19	3	15	1	.184	0	7	1	.063	–	–	–	0
18	Doggie Julian	1936–1944	89	42	46	1	.478	15	8	1	.646	–	–	–	3
19	Larry Rosati	1945	5	0	5	0	.000	–	–	–	–	–	–	–	–
20	Ben Schwartzwalder	1946–1948	30	25	5	0	.833	–	–	–	–	–	–	–	–
21	Howard Baughman	1949–1950	17	4	11	2	.294	–	–	–	–	–	–	–	–
22	Tom Triplett	1951–1955	41	14	25	2	.366	–	–	–	–	–	–	–	–
23	Ray Whispell	1956–1969	121	50	69	2	.421	27	45	2	.378	–	–	–	0
24	Frank P. Marino	1970–1980	99	53	40	6	.566	51	46	6	.524	–	–	–	0
25	Ralph Kirchenheiter	1981–1989	85	52	32	1	.618	42	22	1	.654	–	–	–	2
26	Francis Meagher	1990–1993	39	10	28	1	.269	9	19	0	.321	–	–	–	0
27	Greg Olejack	1994–1996	30	3	26	1	.117	2	18	1	.119	–	–	–	0
28	Mike Donnelly	1997–2017	225	148	77	0	.658	109	52	0	.677	2	5	0	7
29	Nate Milne	2018–present	85	69	16	0	.812	45	10	0	.818	8	4	0	3

== Year-by-year results ==
National champions	Conference champions	Bowl game berth	Playoff berth

Season	Year	Head coach	Association	Division	Conference	Record							Postseason	Final ranking
Season	Year	Head coach	Association	Division	Conference	Overall			Conference				Postseason	Final ranking
Season	Year	Head coach	Association	Division	Conference	Win	Loss	Tie	Finish	Win	Loss	Tie	Postseason	Final ranking
Muhlenberg Mules
1900	1900	Charles Schmidt	—	—	Independent	1	3	1					—	—
1901	1901	Walter Beck	—	—	Independent	1	2	1					—	—
1902	1902	William Grey	—	—	Independent	0	4	3					—	—
No team from 1903 to 1904
1905	1905	Walter Singmaster	—	—	Independent	2	3	1					—	—
1906	1906	Alfred Raub	IAAUS	—	Independent	5	4	0					—	—
1907	1907	George Barclay	IAAUS	—	Independent	7	3	0					—	—
1908	1908	Alfred E. Bull	IAAUS	—	Independent	2	5	1					—	—
1909	1909	Alfred E. Bull	IAAUS	—	Independent	3	4	2					—	—
1910	1910	Alfred E. Bull	NCAA	—	Independent	3	3	1					—	—
1911	1911	Thomas Kelley	NCAA	—	Independent	5	4	0					—	—
1912	1912	Thomas Kelley	NCAA	—	Independent	6	3	0					—	—
1913	1913	Thomas Kelley	NCAA	—	Independent	6	2	1					—	—
1914	1914	George McCaa	NCAA	—	Independent	2	6	2					—	—
1915	1915	George McCaa	NCAA	—	Independent	4	5	0					—	—
1916	1916	John B. Price	NCAA	—	Independent	5	3	1					—	—
1917	1917	John B. Price	NCAA	—	Independent	5	1	2					—	—
1918	1918	Guy Brubaker	NCAA	—	Independent	3	2	0					—	—
1919	1919	Bill Ritter	NCAA	—	Independent	3	5	0					—	—
1920	1920	Bill Ritter	NCAA	—	Independent	3	6	1					—	—
1921	1921	Johnny Spiegel	NCAA	—	Independent	7	2	1					—	—
1922	1922	Johnny Spiegel	NCAA	—	Independent	4	6	1					—	—
1923	1923	Walter W. Wood	NCAA	—	Independent	3	6	1					—	—
1924	1924	Walter W. Wood	NCAA	—	Independent	7	3	0					—	—
1925	1925	Haps Benfer	NCAA	—	Independent	6	3	1					—	—
1926	1926	Haps Benfer	NCAA	—	Eastern Pennsylvania	7	3	0	1st	3	0	0	—	—
1927	1927	Haps Benfer	NCAA	—	Eastern Pennsylvania	5	4	0	3rd	2	2	0	—	—
1928	1928	Haps Benfer	NCAA	—	Eastern Pennsylvania	1	8	0	T–4th	1	3	0	—	—
1929	1929	George Holstrom	NCAA	—	Eastern Pennsylvania	3	6	0	4th	1	3	0	—	—
1930	1930	George Holstrom	NCAA	—	Eastern Pennsylvania	5	4	1	T–2nd	2	1	1	—	—
1931	1931	George Holstrom	NCAA	—	Eastern Pennsylvania	2	8	0	5th	0	4	0	—	—
1932	1932	George Holstrom	NCAA	—	Eastern Pennsylvania	3	4	2	T–1st	2	1	1	—	—
1933	1933	George Holstrom	NCAA	—	Eastern Pennsylvania	6	3	0	T–1st	3	1	0	—	—
1934	1934	John Utz	NCAA	—	Eastern Pennsylvania	2	6	1	5th	0	3	1	—	—
1935	1935	John Utz	NCAA	—	Eastern Pennsylvania	1	9	0	5th	0	4	0	—	—
1936	1936	Doggie Julian	NCAA	—	Eastern Pennsylvania	2	6	1	T–3rd	1	2	1	—	—
1937	1937	Doggie Julian	NCAA	—	Eastern Pennsylvania	5	5	0	T–2nd	2	2	0	—	—
1938	1938	Doggie Julian	NCAA	—	Eastern Pennsylvania	7	3	0	T–1st	3	1	0	—	—
1939	1939	Doggie Julian	NCAA	—	Eastern Pennsylvania	6	4	0	2nd	2	1	0	—	—
1940	1940	Doggie Julian	NCAA	—	Eastern Pennsylvania	4	6	0	2nd	2	1	0	—	—
1941	1941	Doggie Julian	NCAA	—	Eastern Pennsylvania	6	4	0	T–1st	2	1	0	—	—
1942	1942	Doggie Julian	NCAA	—	Eastern Pennsylvania	7	3	0	1st	3	0	0	—	—
1943	1943	Doggie Julian	NCAA	—	Independent	1	10	0					—	—
1944	1944	Doggie Julian	NCAA	—	Independent	4	5	0					—	—
1945	1945	Larry Rosati	NCAA	—	Independent	0	5	0					—	—
1946	1946	Ben Schwartzwalder	NCAA	—	Independent	9	1	0					—	—
1947	1947	Ben Schwartzwalder	NCAA	—	Independent	9	1	0					—	—
1948	1948	Ben Schwartzwalder	NCAA	—	Independent	7	3	0					—	—
1949	1949	Howard Baughman	NCAA	—	Independent	1	7	1					—	—
1950	1950	Howard Baughman	NCAA	—	Independent	3	4	1					—	—
1951	1951	Tom Triplett	NCAA	—	Independent	1	8	0					—	—
1952	1952	Tom Triplett	NCAA	—	Independent	2	5	1					—	—
1953	1953	Tom Triplett	NCAA	—	Independent	3	5	0					—	—
1954	1954	Tom Triplett	NCAA	—	Independent	4	3	1					—	—
1955	1955	Tom Triplett	NCAA	—	Independent	4	4	0					—	—
1956	1956	Ray Whispell	NCAA	College Division	Independent	4	4	0					—	—
1957	1957	Ray Whispell	NCAA	College Division	Independent	4	4	0					—	—
1958	1958	Ray Whispell	NCAA	College Division	MAC	4	4	0	8th (University)	1	2	0	—	—
1959	1959	Ray Whispell	NCAA	College Division	MAC	3	6	0	8th (University)	1	2	0	—	—
1960	1960	Ray Whispell	NCAA	College Division	MAC	6	3	0	8th (University)	1	2	0	—	—
1961	1961	Ray Whispell	NCAA	College Division	MAC	2	7	0	8th (University)	0	4	0	—	—
1962	1962	Ray Whispell	NCAA	College Division	MAC	2	7	0	7th (University)	0	4	0	—	—
1963	1963	Ray Whispell	NCAA	College Division	MAC	5	3	0	2nd (College–Southern)	4	1	0	—	—
1964	1964	Ray Whispell	NCAA	College Division	MAC	5	4	0	3rd (College–Southern)	5	3	0	—	—
1965	1965	Ray Whispell	NCAA	College Division	MAC	1	8	0	9th (College–Southern)	1	8	0	—	—
1966	1966	Ray Whispell	NCAA	College Division	MAC	2	6	1	7th (College–Southern)	2	6	1	—	—
1967	1967	Ray Whispell	NCAA	College Division	MAC	2	5	1	9th (College–Southern)	2	5	1	—	—
1968	1968	Ray Whispell	NCAA	College Division	MAC	6	3	0	3rd (College–Southern)	6	3	0	—	—
1969	1969	Ray Whispell	NCAA	College Division	MAC	4	5	0	6th (College–Southern)	4	5	0	—	—
1970	1970	Frank P. Marino	NCAA	College Division	MAC	7	2	0	2nd (Southern)	7	2	0	—	—
1971	1971	Frank P. Marino	NCAA	College Division	MAC	5	4	0	8th (Southern)	5	4	0	—	—
1972	1972	Frank P. Marino	NCAA	College Division	MAC	1	8	0	T–8th (Southern)	1	7	0	—	—
1973	1973	Frank P. Marino	NCAA	Division III	MAC	7	1	1	3rd (Southern)	7	1	1	—	—
1974	1974	Frank P. Marino	NCAA	Division III	MAC	2	7	0	7th (Southern)	2	6	0	—	—
1975	1975	Frank P. Marino	NCAA	Division III	MAC	2	6	2	7th (Southern)	2	5	2	—	—
1976	1976	Frank P. Marino	NCAA	Division III	MAC	5	3	1	4th (Southern)	5	3	1	—	—
1977	1977	Frank P. Marino	NCAA	Division III	MAC	6	3	0	4th (Southern)	5	3	0	—	—
1978	1978	Frank P. Marino	NCAA	Division III	MAC	6	2	1	4th (Southern)	5	2	1	—	—
1979	1979	Frank P. Marino	NCAA	Division III	MAC	4	3	1	T–4th (Southern)	5	3	1	—	—
1980	1980	Frank P. Marino	NCAA	Division III	MAC	8	1	0	2nd (Southern)	7	1	0	—	—
1981	1981	Ralph Kirchenheiter	NCAA	Division III	MAC	3	5	0	8th (Southern)	3	5	0	—	—
1982	1982	Ralph Kirchenheiter	NCAA	Division III	MAC	4	5	0	5th (Southern)	4	4	0	—	—
1983	1983	Ralph Kirchenheiter	NCAA	Division III	Centennial	6	3	0	T–1st	5	2	0	Conference co-champions	—
1984	1984	Ralph Kirchenheiter	NCAA	Division III	Centennial	6	3	0	3rd	5	2	0	—	—
1985	1985	Ralph Kirchenheiter	NCAA	Division III	Centennial	7	3	0	3rd	5	2	0	—	—
1986	1986	Ralph Kirchenheiter	NCAA	Division III	Centennial	7	3	0	T–1st	6	1	0	Conference co-champions	—
1987	1987	Ralph Kirchenheiter	NCAA	Division III	Centennial	7	3	0	T–2nd	5	2	0	—	—
1988	1988	Ralph Kirchenheiter	NCAA	Division III	Centennial	7	3	0	3rd	5	2	0	—	—
1989	1989	Ralph Kirchenheiter	NCAA	Division III	Centennial	5	4	1	3rd	4	2	1	—	—
1990	1990	Francis Meagher	NCAA	Division III	Centennial	2	8	0	8th	1	6	0	—	—
1991	1991	Francis Meagher	NCAA	Division III	Centennial	3	7	0	T–4th	3	4	0	—	—
1992	1992	Francis Meagher	NCAA	Division III	Centennial	1	8	1	8th	1	6	0	—	—
1993	1993	Francis Meagher	NCAA	Division III	Centennial	4	5	0	T–3rd	4	3	0	—	—
1994	1994	Greg Olejack	NCAA	Division III	Centennial	2	8	0	7th	1	6	0	—	—
1995	1995	Greg Olejack	NCAA	Division III	Centennial	0	9	1	8th	0	6	1	—	—
1996	1996	Greg Olejack	NCAA	Division III	Centennial	1	9	0	7th	1	6	0	—	—
1997	1997	Mike Donnelly	NCAA	Division III	Centennial	1	9	0	7th	1	6	0	—	—
1998	1998	Mike Donnelly	NCAA	Division III	Centennial	5	5	0	5th	3	4	0	—	—
1999	1999	Mike Donnelly	NCAA	Division III	Centennial	6	4	0	T–3rd	3	4	0	—	—
2000	2000	Mike Donnelly	NCAA	Division III	Centennial	9	2	0	T–2nd	5	2	0	W ECAC Southwest Bowl	—
2001	2001	Mike Donnelly	NCAA	Division III	Centennial	7	4	0	T–1st	5	1	0	L ECAC Southeast Bowl	—
2002	2002	Mike Donnelly	NCAA	Division III	Centennial	10	2	0	T–1st	5	1	0	L NCAA Division III Second Round	—
2003	2003	Mike Donnelly	NCAA	Division III	Centennial	7	3	0	T–1st	5	1	0	Conference co-champions	—
2004	2004	Mike Donnelly	NCAA	Division III	Centennial	8	3	0	T–1st	4	2	0	Conference co-champions	—
2005	2005	Mike Donnelly	NCAA	Division III	Centennial	3	7	0	T–5th	2	4	0	—	—
2006	2006	Mike Donnelly	NCAA	Division III	Centennial	5	5	0	T–5th	2	4	0	—	—
2007	2007	Mike Donnelly	NCAA	Division III	Centennial	11	1	0	1st	8	0	0	L NCAA Division III Second Round	8
2008	2008	Mike Donnelly	NCAA	Division III	Centennial	9	2	0	1st	7	1	0	L NCAA Division III First Round	25
2009	2009	Mike Donnelly	NCAA	Division III	Centennial	3	7	0	T–7th	2	6	0	—	—
2010	2010	Mike Donnelly	NCAA	Division III	Centennial	7	4	0	T–1st	7	2	0	L NCAA Division III First Round	—
2011	2011	Mike Donnelly	NCAA	Division III	Centennial	7	3	0	2nd	7	2	0	—	—
2012	2012	Mike Donnelly	NCAA	Division III	Centennial	8	3	0	2nd	7	2	0	L ECAC South Atlantic Bowl	—
2013	2013	Mike Donnelly	NCAA	Division III	Centennial	8	3	0	2nd	7	2	0	L ECAC South Atlantic Bowl	—
2014	2014	Mike Donnelly	NCAA	Division III	Centennial	9	2	0	2nd	8	2	0	L NCAA Division III First Round	23
2015	2015	Mike Donnelly	NCAA	Division III	Centennial	8	3	0	T–2nd	7	2	0	L Centennial-MAC Bowl Series	—
2016	2016	Mike Donnelly	NCAA	Division III	Centennial	9	2	0	2nd	8	1	0	L Centennial-MAC Bowl Series	—
2017	2017	Mike Donnelly	NCAA	Division III	Centennial	8	3	0	T–3rd	6	3	0	W Asa S. Bushnell Bowl	—
2018	2018	Nate Milne	NCAA	Division III	Centennial	11	2	0	T–1st	8	1	0	L NCAA Division III Quarterfinal	9
2019	2019	Nate Milne	NCAA	Division III	Centennial	13	1	0	1st	9	0	0	L NCAA Division III Semifinal	7
No team in 2020 due to COVID-19.
2021	2021	Nate Milne	NCAA	Division III	Centennial	11	2	0	T–1st	8	1	0	L NCAA Division III Quarterfinal	7
2022	2022	Nate Milne	NCAA	Division III	Centennial	7	4	0	3rd	6	3	0	W Centennial-MAC Bowl Series	—
2023	2023	Nate Milne	NCAA	Division III	Centennial	10	1	0	2nd	5	1	0	W Centennial-MAC Bowl Series	22
2024	2024	Nate Milne	NCAA	Division III	Centennial	8	3	0	3rd	4	2	0	W Centennial-MAC Bowl Series	—
2025	2025	Nate Milne	NCAA	Division III	Centennial	9	3	0	3rd	5	2	0	L NCAA Division III Second Round	—

== Gallery ==
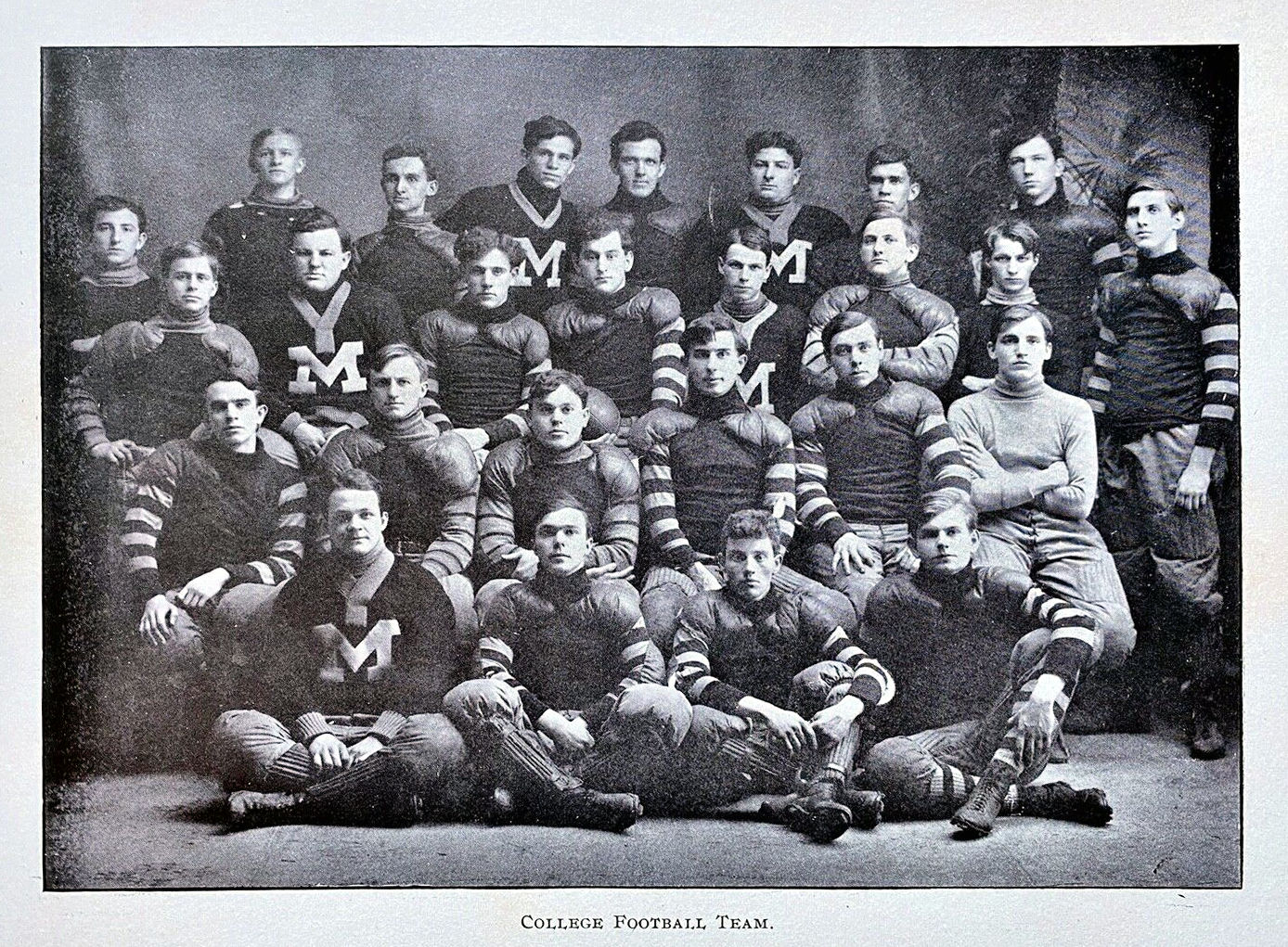
The 1908 Muhlenberg Mules football team, coached by Alfred E. Bull

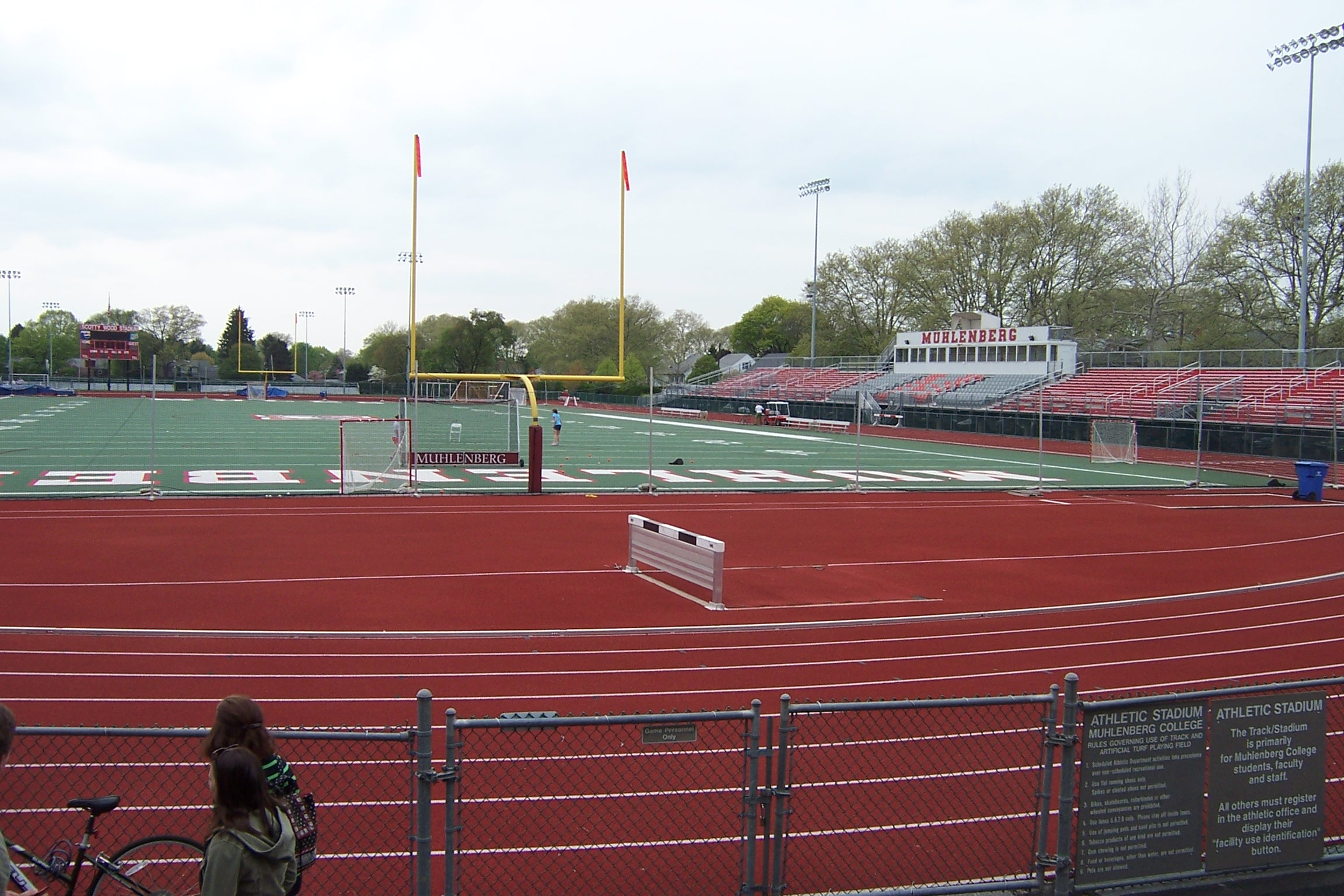
Scotty Wood Stadium, the on-campus home field

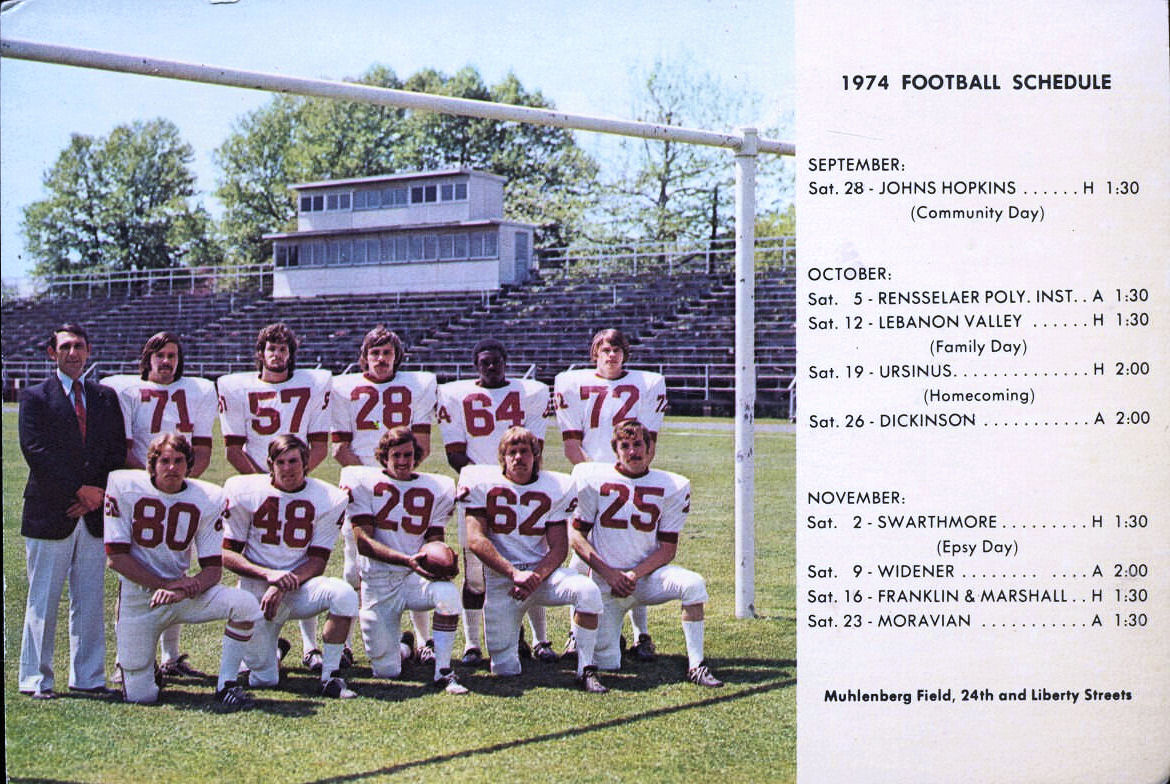
1974 team

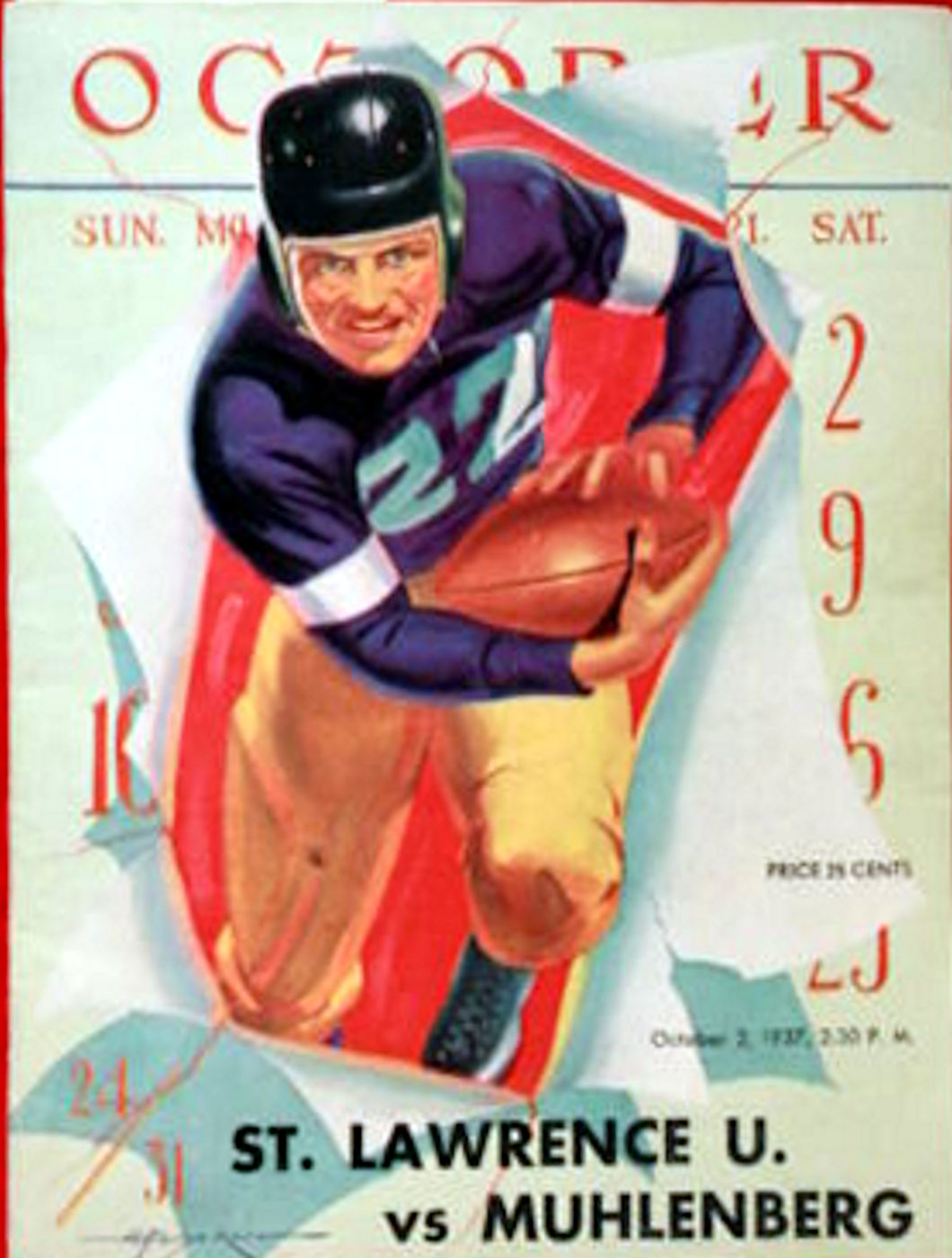
1937 program

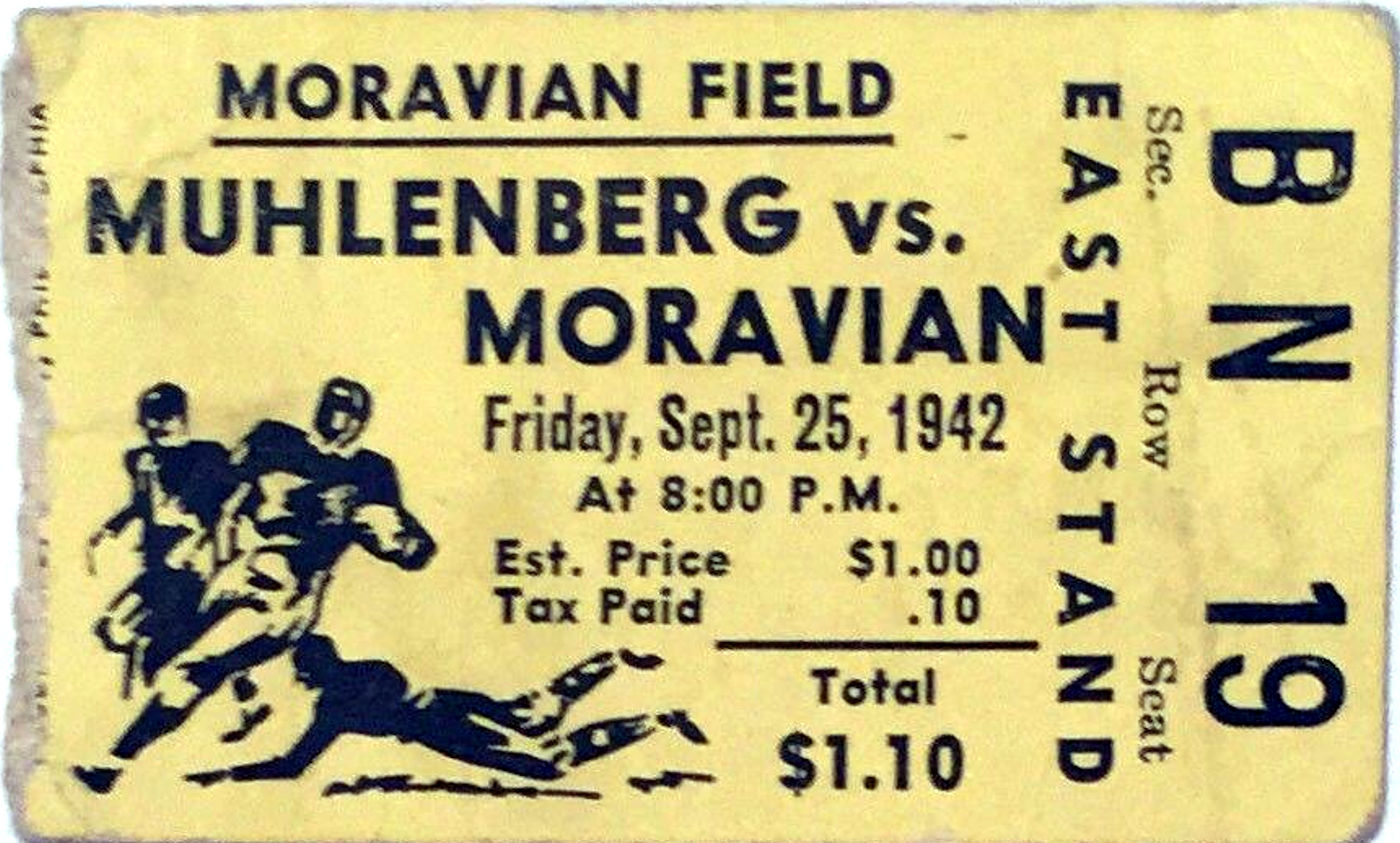
1942 ticket

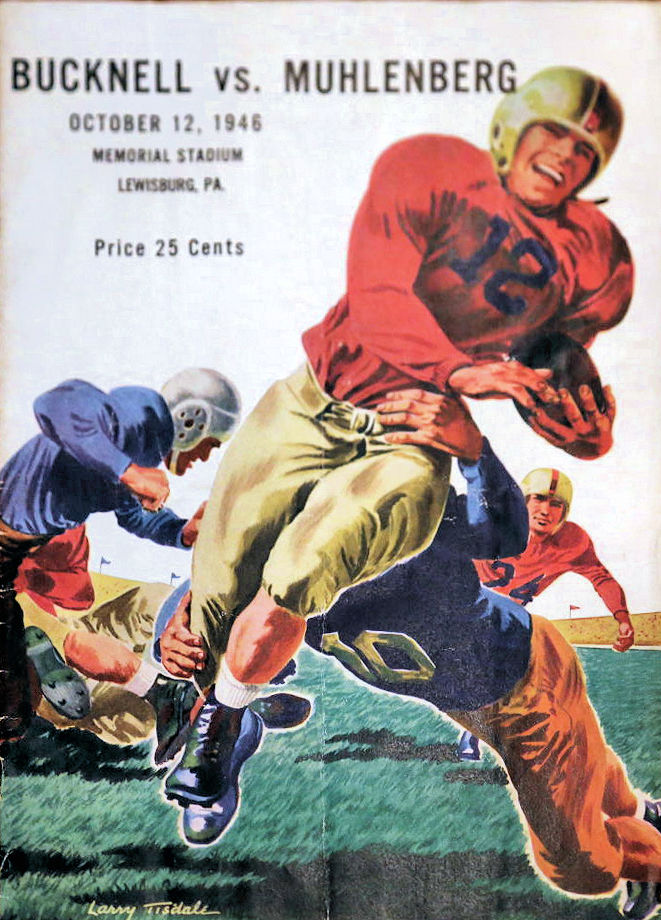
1946 program
