= St. Clair, Pennsylvania =

Borough in Pennsylvania, US

- Borough
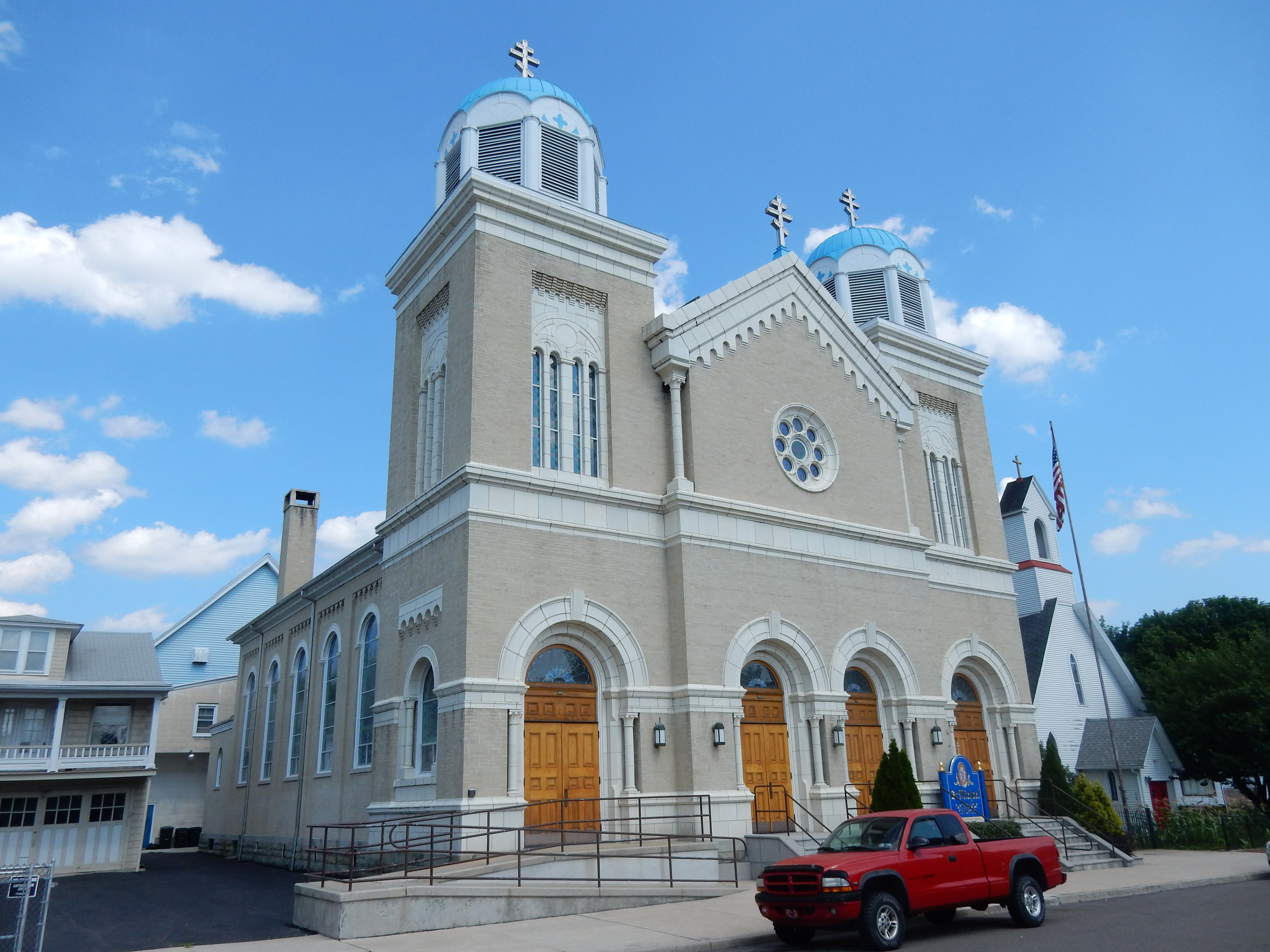
- St. Michael Orthodox Church in St. Clair, 2015

- Location of St. Clair in Schuylkill County, Pennsylvania.

- Location in Pennsylvania St. Clair (the United States)
- Coordinates: 40°43′14″N 76°11′28″W
- Country: United States
- State: Pennsylvania
- County: Schuylkill
- Settled: 1829
- Incorporated: 1850

Government
  - Type: Borough Council
  - Mayor: Martin Salata Jr.

Area
  - Total: 1.23 sq mi (3.19 km^{2})
  - Land: 1.23 sq mi (3.19 km^{2})
  - Water: 0 sq mi (0.00 km^{2})
- Elevation: 738 ft (225 m)

Population (2020)
  - Total: 2,752 ▼
  - Estimate (2021): 2,762
  - Density: 2,295.0/sq mi (886.11/km^{2})
- Time zone: UTC-5 (Eastern (EST))
  - Summer (DST): UTC-4 (EDT)
- Zip code: 17970
- Area code: 570
- FIPS code: 42-67224
- GNIS feature ID: 1185877
- Website: Official website

St. Clair is a borough in Schuylkill County, Pennsylvania, United States. As of the 2020 census, St. Clair had a population of 2,745. It is located 2 mi (3.2 km) north of Pottsville in the southern Coal Region. Extensive deposits of hard coal are present.

St. Clair is noted for manufacturing squibs, fuses and caps used in the mining industry.

== Geography ==
According to the United States Census Bureau, the borough has a total area of 1.2 square miles (3.1 km^{2}), all land.

== Demographics ==
Historical population
Census	Pop.	Note	%±
1850	2,016		—
1860	4,901		143.1%
1870	5,726		16.8%
1880	4,149		−27.5%
1890	3,681		−11.3%
1900	4,638		26.0%
1910	6,455		39.2%
1920	6,495		0.6%
1930	7,296		12.3%
1940	6,809		−6.7%
1950	5,856		−14.0%
1960	5,159		−11.9%
1970	4,576		−11.3%
1980	4,037		−11.8%
1990	3,524		−12.7%
2000	3,254		−7.7%
2010	3,004		−7.7%
2020	2,745		−8.6%
2021 (est.)	2,762	▲	0.6%

As of the census of 2000, there were 3,254 people, 1,497 households, and 887 families residing in the borough. The population density was 2,661.7 inhabitants per square mile (1,027.7/km^{2}). There were 1,647 housing units at an average density of 1,347.2 per square mile (520.2/km^{2}). The racial makeup of the borough was 98.71% White, 0.68% African American, 0.09% Native American, 0.06% Asian, 0.22% from other races, and 0.25% from two or more races. Hispanic or Latino of any race were 0.71% of the population.

There were 1,497 households, out of which 20.2% had children under the age of 18 living with them, 41.1% were married couples living together, 12.5% had a female householder with no husband present, and 40.7% were non-families. 36.6% of all households were made up of individuals, and 22.2% had someone living alone who was 65 years of age or older. The average household size was 2.17 and the average family size was 2.83.

In the borough the population was spread out, with 18.6% under the age of 18, 6.4% from 18 to 24, 26.2% from 25 to 44, 22.7% from 45 to 64, and 26.1% who were 65 years of age or older. The median age was 44 years. For every 100 females, there were 88.4 males. For every 100 females age 18 and over, there were 85.2 males.

The median income for a household in the borough was $28,161, and the median income for a family was $35,024. Males had a median income of $28,566 versus $20,719 for females. The per capita income for the borough was $15,418. About 7.7% of families and 11.8% of the population were below the poverty line, including 14.6% of those under age 18 and 9.9% of those age 65 or over.

In the 2000 census, 8.8% of the population claimed Ukrainian ancestry.

== Notable people ==
- Joel Thompson Boone, U.S. Navy vice admiral, received Congressional Medal of Honor for actions during WW I.
- Vincent Carter, U.S. Representative from Wyoming.
- Michael Dudick, priest and bishop of the Byzantine Catholic Metropolitan Church of Pittsburgh.
- Joe Holden, baseball catcher, Philadelphia Phillies (1934–1936).
- Tim Holden, U.S. Representative for Pennsylvania's 17th congressional district and chairman of the Pennsylvania Liquor Control Board.
- John B. Price, football coach.
- Ed Sharockman, professional football player; started in Super Bowl IV.
- John Titus - baseball outfielder for the Philadelphia Phillies (1903–12) and Boston Braves (1912–13).

== Gallery ==
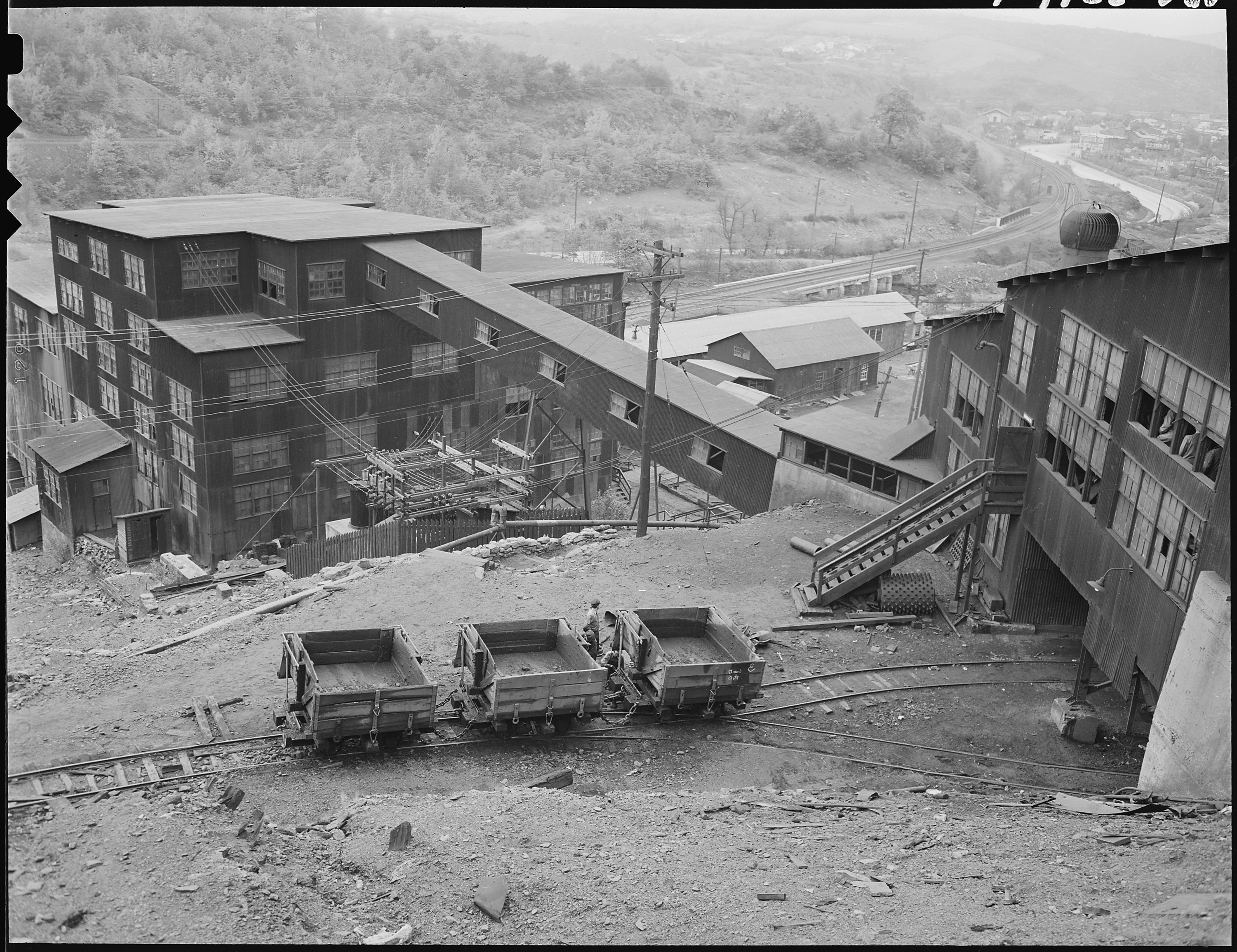
St. Clair Coal Company, 1946

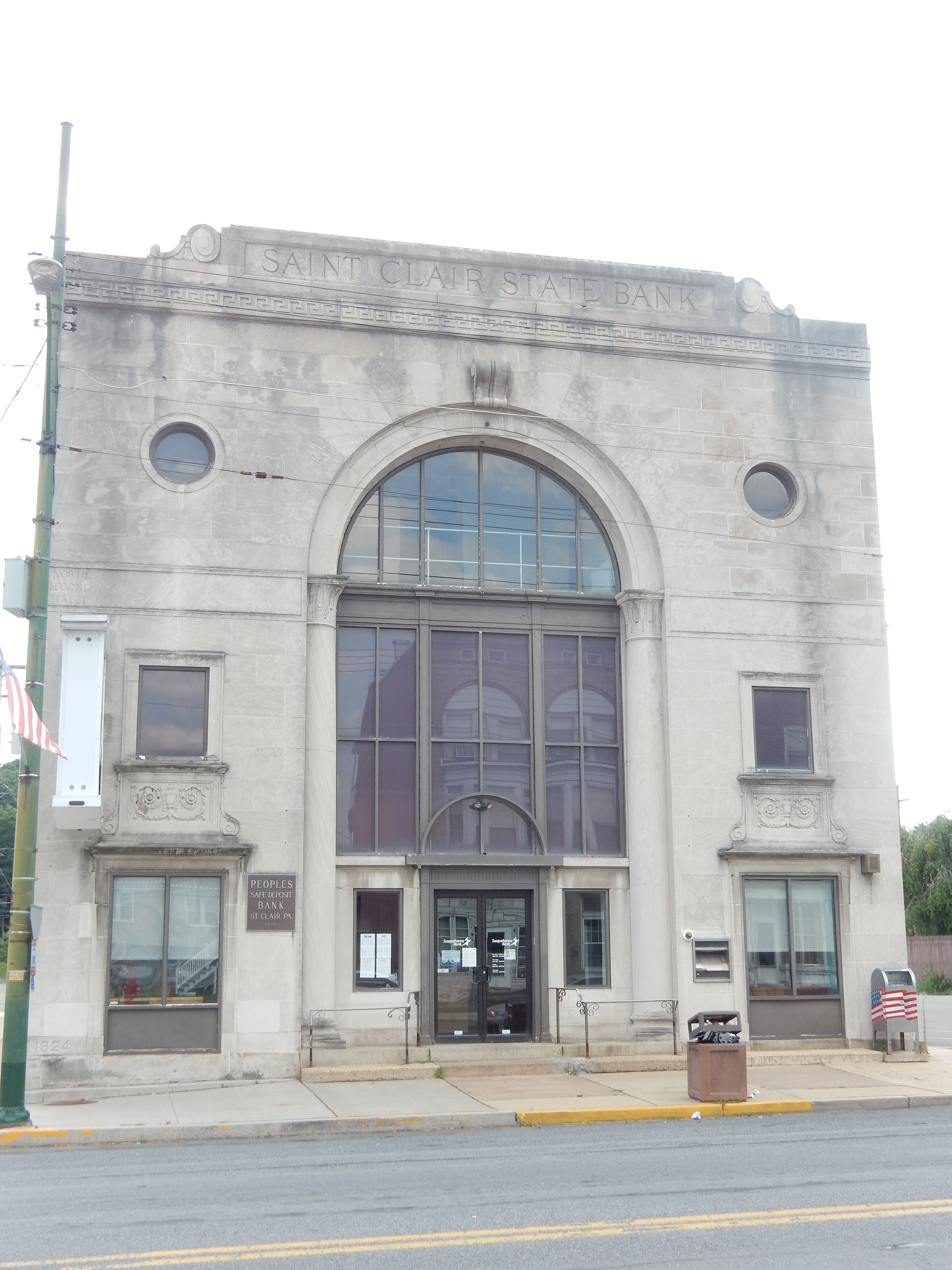
Saint Clair State Bank, 1924

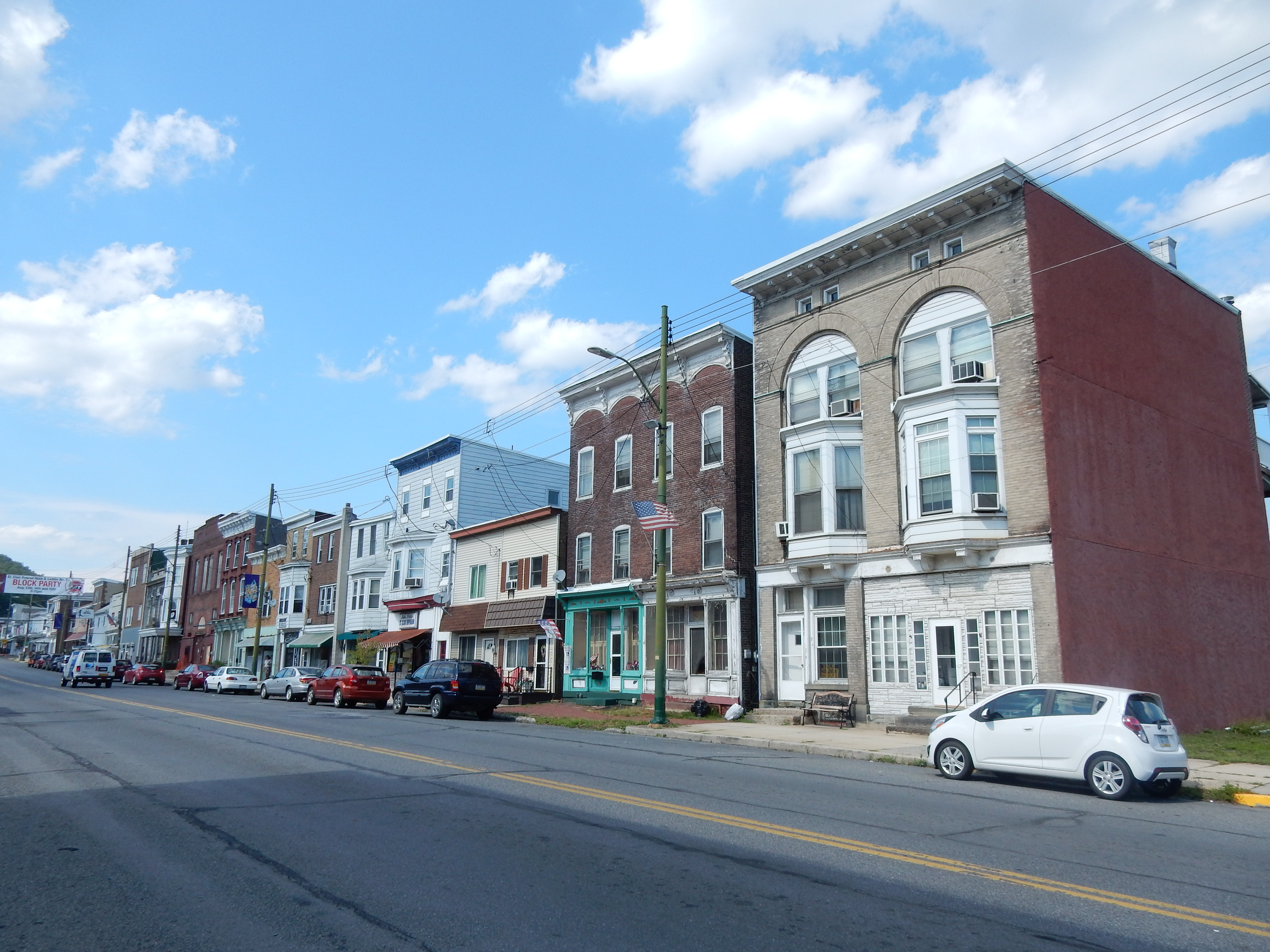
Second Street in St. Clair

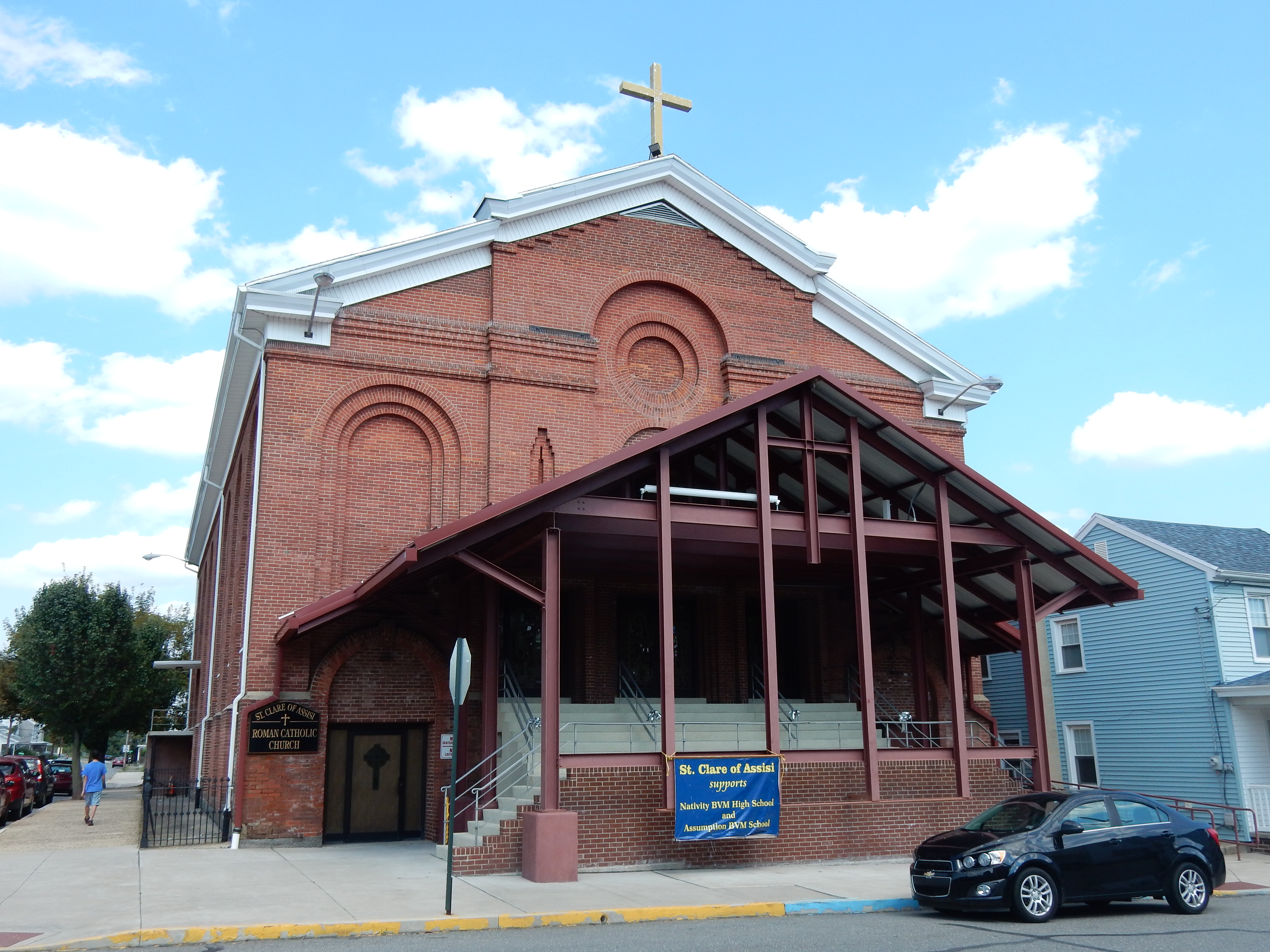
St. Clare of Assisi Catholic Church

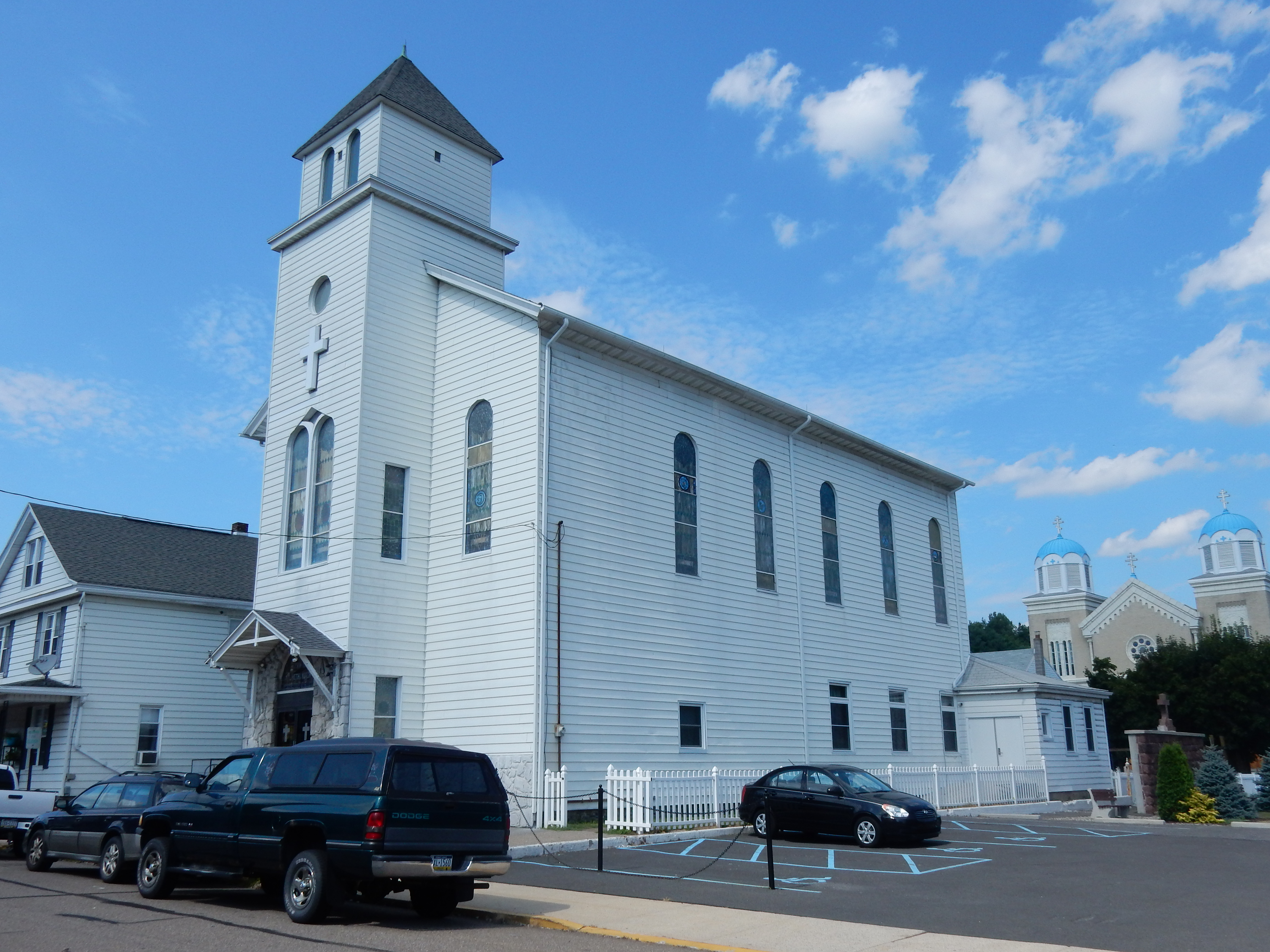
First Primitive Methodist Church
