= Joe Holden =

American baseball player (1913-1996)

- Catcher
- Born: June 4, 1913; St. Clair, Pennsylvania, U.S.
- Died: May 10, 1996 (aged 82); St. Clair, Pennsylvania, U.S.
- Batted: Left Threw: Right

MLB debut
- June 14, 1934, for the Philadelphia Phillies

Last MLB appearance
- April 21, 1936, for the Philadelphia Phillies

MLB statistics
- Games played: 17
- Hits: 2
- At bats: 24
- Stats at Baseball Reference

Teams
- Philadelphia Phillies (1934–1936)

Joseph Francis Holden (June 4, 1913 – May 10, 1996), nicknamed "Socks," was an American professional baseball player, manager and scout.

== Biography ==
Holden was a backup catcher in Major League Baseball who played from 1934 through 1936 for the Philadelphia Phillies. Listed at 5 ft 8 in (1.73 m), 175 lb., Holden batted left-handed and threw right-handed. He was born in St. Clair, Pennsylvania.

Over parts of three major league seasons, Holden was a .083 hitter (2-for-24) with one run and one stolen base in 17 games. He did not hit for any extrabases and not drove in a run.

== Death ==
Holden died in his home city of St. Clair, Pennsylvania, at the age of 82.
