= Kathleen E. Harring =

University president

13th President of Muhlenberg College
- Incumbent
- Assumed office June 19, 2019; Interim: June 19, 2019 – June 26, 2020
- Preceded by: John I. Williams Jr.

Personal details
- Spouse: John Wittenbaker
- Children: 1
- Education: Franklin & Marshall College (BA); University of North Carolina at Chapel Hill (MA, PhD)

Academic background
- Thesis: The effect of perceived group deprivation on social orientation (1984)

Kathleen E. Harring is an American educator and the 13th president of Muhlenberg College in Allentown, Pennsylvania.

== Early life and education ==
Harring graduated high school in 1976 from Tri-Valley High School in Hegins, Pennsylvania. Harring received her bachelor's in psychology from Franklin & Marshall College, and then earned her master's and Ph.D. in social psychology at University of North Carolina at Chapel Hill.

== Career ==
Harring began her academic career at Muhlenberg College as an assistant professor in the psychology department in 1984. She was appointed provost of Muhlenberg College by then-president John I. Williams in 2017. She was appointed interim president on June 19, 2019, following the departure of President John I. Williams, Jr., and officially named president on June 26, 2020. Harring was inaugurated November 12, 2021 after more than a year delay due to the COVID-19 pandemic. She is the first female president of Muhlenberg College. Dr. Harring will be retiring in June 2027.

=== Awards and honors ===
In 1991 Harring received the Christian R. and Mary F. Lindback Foundation Awards for distinguished teaching.
