= John Utz (coach) =

American athlete and coach

Playing career

Football
- 1927–1929: Penn
- Position: Tackle

Coaching career (HC unless noted)

Football
- 1934–1935: Muhlenberg

Basketball
- 1933–1936: Muhlenberg

Baseball
- 1934–1935: Muhlenberg

Head coaching record
- Overall: 3–15–1 (football); 30–27 (basketball)

Accomplishments and honors

Awards
- All-American (1929)

John L. Utz was an American football, baseball, and basketball player and coach. He served as the head football coach (1934–1935), men's basketball coach (1933–1936), and baseball coach at Muhlenberg College in Allentown, Pennsylvania.

== Head coaching record ==
=== Football ===
Year	Team	Overall	Conference	Standing	Bowl/playoffs
Muhlenberg Mules (Eastern Pennsylvania Collegiate Conference) (1934–1935)
1934	Muhlenberg	2–6–1	0–3–1	5th	
1935	Muhlenberg	1–9	0–4	5th	
Muhlenberg:		3–15–1	0–7–1		
Total:		3–15–1			
