= Larry Rosati =

American football player and coach (1918–1997)

Biographical details
- Born: January 20, 1918
- Died: September 15, 1997 (aged 79)

Playing career
- 1938–1941: Moravian
- Positions: Quarterback, defensive back

Coaching career (HC unless noted)
- 1945: Muhlenberg
- 1946–1950: Moravian

Head coaching record
- Overall: 13–31–2

Lawrence J. Rosati (January 20, 1918 – September 15, 1997) was an American college football coach. He served as the head football coach at Muhlenberg College in 1945. Rosati then moved to Moravian College, where he was the head football coach from 1946 to 1950.

== Head coaching record ==
Year	Team	Overall	Conference	Standing	Bowl/playoffs
Muhlenberg Mules (Independent) (1945)
1945	Muhlenberg	0–5			
Muhlenberg:		0–5			
Moravian Greyhounds (Independent) (1946–1950)
1946	Moravian	4–4–1			
1947	Moravian	4–4			
1948	Moravian	1–6–1			
1949	Moravian	3–5			
1950	Moravian	1–7			
Moravian:		13–26–2			
Total:		13–31–2			
