= Sleeping Rough in Port-au-Prince =

2006 book by Kovats-Bernat

Sleeping Rough in Port-au-Prince: An Ethnography of Street Children and Violence in Haiti
- Author: J. Christopher Kovats-Bernat
- Language: English
- Genre: Non-fiction
- Publisher: University Press of Florida
- Publication date: 2006
- Publication place: United States

Sleeping Rough in Port-au-Prince: An Ethnography of Street Children and Violence in Haiti is a 2006 book by American cultural anthropologist J. Christopher Kovats-Bernat. It was published by University Press of Florida. The book was the subject of scholarly reviews. In 2001, Kovats-Bernat wrote a dissertation at Temple University on street children in Port-au-Prince.
