= Walter W. Wood =

American football player and sports coach (1894–1980)

Biographical details
- Born: September 28, 1894; Madison, Illinois, U.S.
- Died: January 18, 1980 (aged 85); Alton, Illinois, U.S.

Playing career

Football
- 1914–1915: Kansas
- 1919: Kansas

Baseball
- 1915–1916: Kansas
- 1920: Kansas
- Positions: Quarterback, center (football)

Coaching career (HC unless noted)

Football
- 1916: Alton HS (IL)
- 1920: Shurtleff
- 1922: Shurtleff
- 1923–1924: Muhlenberg
- 1925–1933: Shurtleff

Basketball
- 1924–1925: Muhlenberg
- ?–1934: Shurtleff
- 1939–?: Alton HS (IL)

Baseball
- 1924–1925: Muhlenberg

Walter Winfred "Punk" Wood (September 28, 1894 – January 18, 1980) was an American football player and a football, basketball, and baseball coach. He lettered three times as a quarterback and center at the University of Kansas (1914–1915, 1919).

Wood attended Alton High School in Alton, Illinois, where he was captain and quarterback for the football team in 1912. He served in the United States Army during World War I.

Wood coached at Alton High School during the 1916–17 academic year. In 1920, he was hired as coach and head of athletics at Shurtleff College in Alton.

Wood left his coaching position at Shurtleff at the close of the basketball season in 1934 to head the sports department at Owens-Illinois, Inc.—now known as O-I Glass. He was later the personnel director for the firm's plant in Alton. In 1944, Wood was transferred to Toledo, Ohio, where he worked a general veterans coordinator until 1948, when he was appointed the personnel director of O-I's Kimble Glass division. He remained in that role until his retirement, in 1959, when he returned to Alton. He died on January 18, 1980, in Alton.
