= John Williams Jr. (university president) =

Former president of Muhlenberg College

John I. Williams, Jr.
- Education: Amherst College, BA, Harvard University, JD/MBA
- Employer: Celeritas Center for Intercultural Equity
- Known for: Former president, Muhlenberg College
- Board member of: Amherst College, Kent School
- Spouse: Tree

John I. Williams Jr. is the former and 12th president of Muhlenberg College in Allentown, Pennsylvania. He was the first African American to be named president of a Lutheran college.

Williams currently serves as co-founder and president of the Celeritas Center for Intercultural Equity, a Boston-based nonprofit organization dedicated to improving educational and career opportunities and equity for Black, Latinx, and other underrepresented minority students.

== Early life and education ==
Williams was born in 1954 in New York City and grew up in suburban Westbury, New York. He graduated cum laude from Kent School in Kent, Connecticut. He earned a BA in economics, magna cum laude, at Amherst College followed by a JD from Harvard Law School and an MBA from Harvard Business School.

== Career ==
Williams began his career as the first African American to be hired by Bain & Company, a global management consulting firm. He later served in several capacities under American Express's first Black chief executive officer Kenneth Chenault, including as senior vice president of strategic planning, vice president of the U.S. Platinum Card, senior vice president of marketing information services, and senior vice president and general manager of the Consumer Travel Network.

He was chief executive officer of Biztravel.com and, later, Sentient Jet. He managed the consulting services group for Eduventures and, later, served as a partner in the higher education practice at The Bridgespan Group, a non-profit spinoff of Bain & Company. Between 2010 and 2015, Williams served as an Expert-in-Residence at Harvard University’s Innovation Lab.

=== College presidency ===
In July 2015, Williams became president of Muhlenberg College in Allentown, Pennsylvania. In 2016, he established a Sustainability Strategic Plan to further systematize the usage of sustainable energy at the college and launched a program to enable students to develop mentor relationships based on shared interests using an online database. Under Williams' tenure, Muhlenberg also launched a strategic plan, comprehensive rebranding and visual identity system, a campus master plan, and aggressive implementation of its diversity strategic plan.

He departed from his position after four years in 2019, and was succeeded by Kathleen E. Harring.

== Personal ==
Since 1984, he has served on the board of trustees of Amherst College, and since 1996, as a Life Trustee. Williams also serves as a trustee of the Kent School and the Walnut Hill Center for the Arts in Natick, Massachusetts.

He is married to Diane Pierce-Williams, daughter of Harvard University professor and psychiatrist, Dr. Chester Middlebrook Pierce. They have three adult children and two grandchildren. He earned a private pilot license at Hanscom Field in Bedford and currently holds an airline transport pilot certificate from the FAA for both single- and multi-engine aircraft.
