= Brett Bara =

Writer, designer, television personality

Brett Bara is the founder of Brooklyn Craft Company, and Hello Bargello, as well as a writer, designer, television personality, spokesperson and consultant in the craft and DIY (do-it-yourself) community. She previously hosted the Emmy-nominated public television series Knit & Crochet Now.

Bara is the former editor former Editor in Chief of Crochet Today magazine and craft editor at Woman’s Day Special Interest Publications. She is the author of the book Sewing in a Straight Line and creator of the blog Manhattan Craft Room. She also writes a sewing column, Sewing 101, for the blog Design Sponge. She is the co-author of the cookbook Sweet Serendipity (Rizzoli, 2004).

She has been featured as a craft expert in The Wall Street Journal, Etsy.com, ABC News.com, The Associated Press and Lifetime.com.

Before launching Brooklyn Craft Company, Brett worked independently as an author, designer and DIY expert. She is the author of Sewing in a Straight Line (Potter Craft/Random House, 2011), one of the top sewing instructors on the video class site Craftsy.com, and a DIY columnist for Design Sponge. She has appeared on The Martha Stewart show and in numerous DIY-related television segments and videos. Her craft-related work has been featured in the Wall Street Journal, The Martha Stewart Crafts Department blog, the West Elm blog, Design Sponge, and more.

== Personal life ==
Brett grew up in a small town of Wampum in western Pennsylvania. She credits her parents, who are both do-it-yourself types, with being a strong influence on her career.
