= Sisto Averno =

American football player (1925–2012)

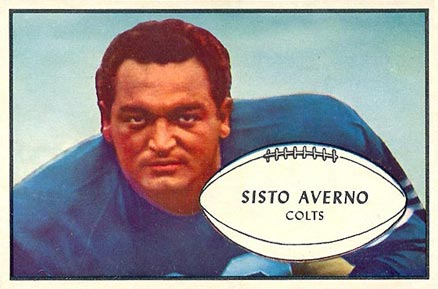
- Averno on a 1953 Bowman football card

No. 32, 44, 60
- Positions: Guard, linebacker

Personal information
- Born: May 25, 1925; Paterson, New Jersey, U.S.
- Died: March 26, 2012 (aged 86); Randallstown, Maryland, U.S.
- Listed height: 5 ft 11 in (1.80 m)
- Listed weight: 240 lb (109 kg)

Career information
- High school: Paterson
- College: Muhlenberg (1946–1949)
- NFL draft: 1951: 30th round, 362nd overall pick

Career history
- Baltimore Colts (1950); New York Yanks (1951); Dallas Texans (1952); Baltimore Colts (1953–1954)

Career NFL statistics
- Games played: 51
- Games started: 36
- Fumble recoveries: 5
- Stats at Pro Football Reference

Sisto Joseph "Joe" Averno (May 12, 1925 – March 26, 2012) was an American professional football guard and linebacker who played in the National Football League (NFL) for the original Baltimore Colts (1950) and the franchises which succeeded it, including the New York Yanks (1951), Dallas Texans (1952), and the second iteration of the Baltimore Colts (1953–1954).

Averno is a member of the Muhlenberg College Athletic Hall of Fame.

== Early life and education ==
Averno (second from left) and the starters of Central High School in Paterson, New Jersey, in November 1942

Averno was born May 12, 1925, in Paterson, New Jersey, the son of Robert Averno and his wife.

He attended Central High School in Paterson, where he played football, where he earned three letters as a tackle for the Central High Colts. During his 1942 senior season he received honorable mention for the New Jersey All-State football team.

With America embroiled in World War II, Averno enlisted in the U.S. Navy in April 1943, eventually serving a three year term of duty. Averno was sent to the Service School at Pontiac, Michigan, where he was promoted to gunner's mate, third class, and given more advanced training.

He was stationed in California and trained with the amphibious forces for the Pacific theater. While in the military he played for the 1944 Fleet City Bluejackets football team.

During 15 months of sea duty aboard small craft, Averno collected two theater medals, a Philippine liberation medal, and several battle stars.

== College career ==
In 1946 Averno enrolled at Muhlenberg College, a small liberal arts college in Allentown, Pennsylvania. He played football at Muhlenberg for four years at the tackle and guard positions, earning the accolades of his coach, Howard Baughman.

Averno and the Muhlenberg Mules played in the 1946 Tobacco Bowl at Lexington, Kentucky, with Averno starting a left tackle with a listed height of 5'11" and weight of 215 pounds. Averno later regarded this 28–25 victory as among his greatest thrills of college football.

Averno was plagued by injuries during his college years, including a significant knee injury in 1946 and a leg injury in 1948 that required hospitalization. Averno had one surgery during his college years associated with these injuries, for repair of torn cartilage.

== Professional career ==
Averno ahead of his 1953 season with the Baltimore Colts

In the days before massive television money and massive player contracts, NFL players generally worked in jobs unrelated to football in the off-season. Averno sold cars.

Averno joined the first iteration of the Baltimore Colts of the National Football League (NFL) as an undrafted free agent in 1950.

The 1950 season was the last for the original Colts franchise for financial reasons. The team's players were distributed throughout the league by reentry into the 1951 NFL draft, with Averno among them. On January 19, Averno was selected by the Cleveland Browns with the final pick of 30th and last round of the 1951 draft. He was quick to sign with the Browns, inking a contract early in February. He would play one exhibition game for the Browns against the College All-Stars in Chicago that August before being traded to the New York Yanks for a future draft pick.

Even his short association with the All-America Football Conference and NFL champion Paul Brown of the Browns was illuminating, and Averno considered him the best coach he had worked with to date. "He has a good system... a ratings percentage for each player based on the successes totaled in the various plays of a game. In this way, a book is kept on every player and each week he is shown how effective or ineffective he is."

Averno saw significant time playing with the Yanks in the 1951 season, playing in all 12 games in a reserve and special teams role. That campaign would be the last for the troubled franchise, assets of which were sold to a new ownership group based in Dallas. The new club, initially identifying itself as the Dallas Rebels before deciding upon the moniker "Texans," advanced a contract to Averno for the 1952 season in May, which the lineman deemed satisfactory and signed.

Averno played middle guard — essentially nose tackle in a five man defensive front — for the Texans in 1952, starting 11 of the team's 12 games in that position. The team's finances were precarious, however, and following the season its assets were sold to news franchise owners in Baltimore headed by industrialist Carroll Rosenbloom.

Averno would make the move to the new Baltimore Colts, signing with the team in March for the 1953 season. Averno would start at (defensive) middle guard in all 12 of the team's games of its inaugural season. The Colts finished with a record of 3–9 for the year, exceeding popular expectations and beating the neighboring Washington Redskins to boot.

The 1954 season would be Joe Averno's last. The contract for his fifth NFL year was signed by the lineman "built like a block of granite" on schedule in April. But as the new season began, little injuries began to pile up, including an aggravated calf strain. On October 15, after just three games of the season, Averno was released by the Colts, who picked up former Washington Redskin Gene Pepper to fill his roster space. At the age of 29, Averno's professional football career was over.

During his five year professional football career never made more than $9,500 in a season (about $107,000 in 2024 terms), with $4,000 starting pay starting pay as a rookie in 1950. He was sanguine about this economic reality, telling a friendly journalist early in 1952, "Linemen don't get as much money as the backs. The guards and tackles do the brunt of the work but have to take second place to the fellows who carry the ball. But that's how it is and we have to accept it."

With just a 33-man active roster, Averno had to work hard for his game checks, frequently playing extended minutes in all three phases of team activity — as a member of the offensive line, a defender in the linebacking corps, and a blocker and tackler on special teams. A physical toll was taken on his body, with coaches unsympathetic to his plight. Averno later recalled: "One time, I separated my shoulder. I told the coach, Clem Crowe. He said, 'Block with the other one.'"

== Post-football career ==
Averno married the former Margaret Meredith of Baltimore in late 1950. During the off-season while he was an active player, Averno worked in Baltimore as a car salesman.

In his later years, Sisto suffered a stroke, had his knee and a hip replaced, and he also required the use of a walker to get around. These conditions are thought to be linked to injuries he suffered during his playing years. Because of these health conditions, Averno became an advocate for better benefits to retired NFL players.

In 1953, as his career was nearing a close, Averno told a friendly journalist with The Baltimore Sun: "It's a tough racket, this pro football, but I love it. That's what makes playing in Baltimore such a pleasure — it's like a college town. They cheer you whether you win or lose and give you all the encouragement you need.... I like the comradeship and the actual thrill of tackling and blocking in a game. All that makes up for the tough training grind we have to put in each year. That's the worst curse of pro football. The game is great, but oh, the training."

== Death ==
Averno died March 26, 2012, in Randallstown, Maryland, at age 86.

== Legacy ==
Averno's college football career earned him induction into the Muhlenberg College Athletic Hall of Fame.
