= Nate Milne =

American football coach

Current position
- Title: Head coach
- Team: Muhlenberg
- Conference: Centennial
- Record: 71–18

Playing career
- 1999–2002: Hobart

Coaching career (HC unless noted)
- 2004: Hamilton (TE)
- 2005–2007: Cortland (OL)
- 2008–2014: Susquehanna (OC/OL)
- 2015–2017: Muhlenberg (OC/OL)
- 2018–present: Muhlenberg

Head coaching record
- Overall: 71–18
- Bowls: 2–0
- Tournaments: 8–4 (NCAA D-III playoffs)

Accomplishments and honors

Championships
- 3 Centennial (2018–2019, 2021)

Awards
- AFCA NCAA Division III COY (2019); 2× Centennial Coach of the Year (2018–2019)

Nate Milne is an American college football coach. He is the head football coach for Muhlenberg College, a position he has held since 2018. In 2019, Milne was awarded the AFCA Coach of the Year Award for NCAA Division III.

== Early life and education ==
Milne attended Jamestown High School in Jamestown, New York, where he graduated in 1999. He then attended Hobart and William Smith Colleges in Geneva, New York, where he played college football for the Hobart Statesmen.

== Head coaching record ==
Year	Team	Overall	Conference	Standing	Bowl/playoffs	D3^{#}	AFCA^{°}
Muhlenberg Mules (Centennial Conference) (2018–present)
2018	Muhlenberg	11–2	8–1	T–1st	L NCAA Division III Quarterfinal	9	
2019	Muhlenberg	13–1	9–0	1st	L NCAA Division III Semifinal	7	
2020–21	No team—COVID-19						
2021	Muhlenberg	11–2	8–1	T–1st	L NCAA Division III Quarterfinal	13	
2022	Muhlenberg	7–4	6–3	3rd			
2023	Muhlenberg	10–1	5–1	2nd	W Centennial-MAC	22	21
2024	Muhlenberg	8–3	4–2	3rd	W Centennial-MAC		
2025	Muhlenberg	9–3	5–2	3rd	L NCAA Division III Second Round		
2026	Muhlenberg	2–2	0–1				
Muhlenberg:		71–18	45–11				
Total:		71–18					
National championship Conference title Conference division title or championship game berth
