= Muhlenberg College =

Private college in Allentown, Pennsylvania, US

- Former names: Allentown Seminary (1848–1864); Allentown Collegiate Institute and Military Academy (1864–1867); Allentown Collegiate Institute (1867)
- Type: Private liberal arts college
- Established: 1848; 178 years ago
- Religious affiliation: Evangelical Lutheran Church in America
- Academic affiliations: Annapolis Group; CLAC; LVAIC
- Endowment: $324.5 million (2024)
- President: Kathleen E. Harring
- Faculty: 171 full-time, 123 part-time
- Students: 2,225
- Undergraduates: 2,225 students (43% men, 57% women)
- Location: Allentown, Pennsylvania, U.S. 40°35′51″N 75°30′36″W
- Campus: 51 acres (21 ha); Suburban
- Colors: Cardinal and Grey
- Nickname: Mules
- Sporting affiliations: NCAA Division III; Centennial Conference, ECAC
- Mascot: Marti The Mule
- Website: muhlenberg.edu
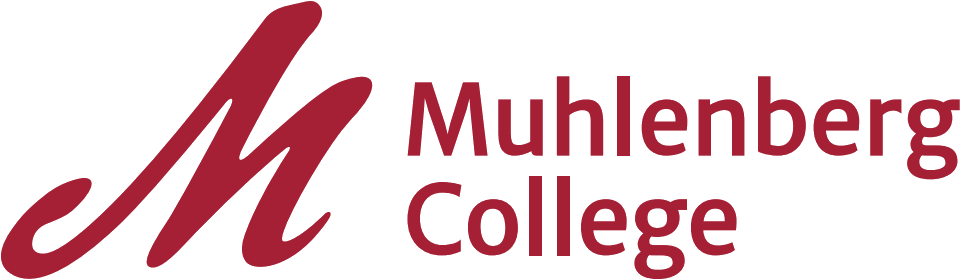

Muhlenberg College is a private liberal arts college in Allentown, Pennsylvania, United States. Founded in 1848, Muhlenberg College is affiliated with the Evangelical Lutheran Church in America and is named for Henry Muhlenberg, the German patriarch of Lutheranism in the United States.

== History ==
=== 19th century ===
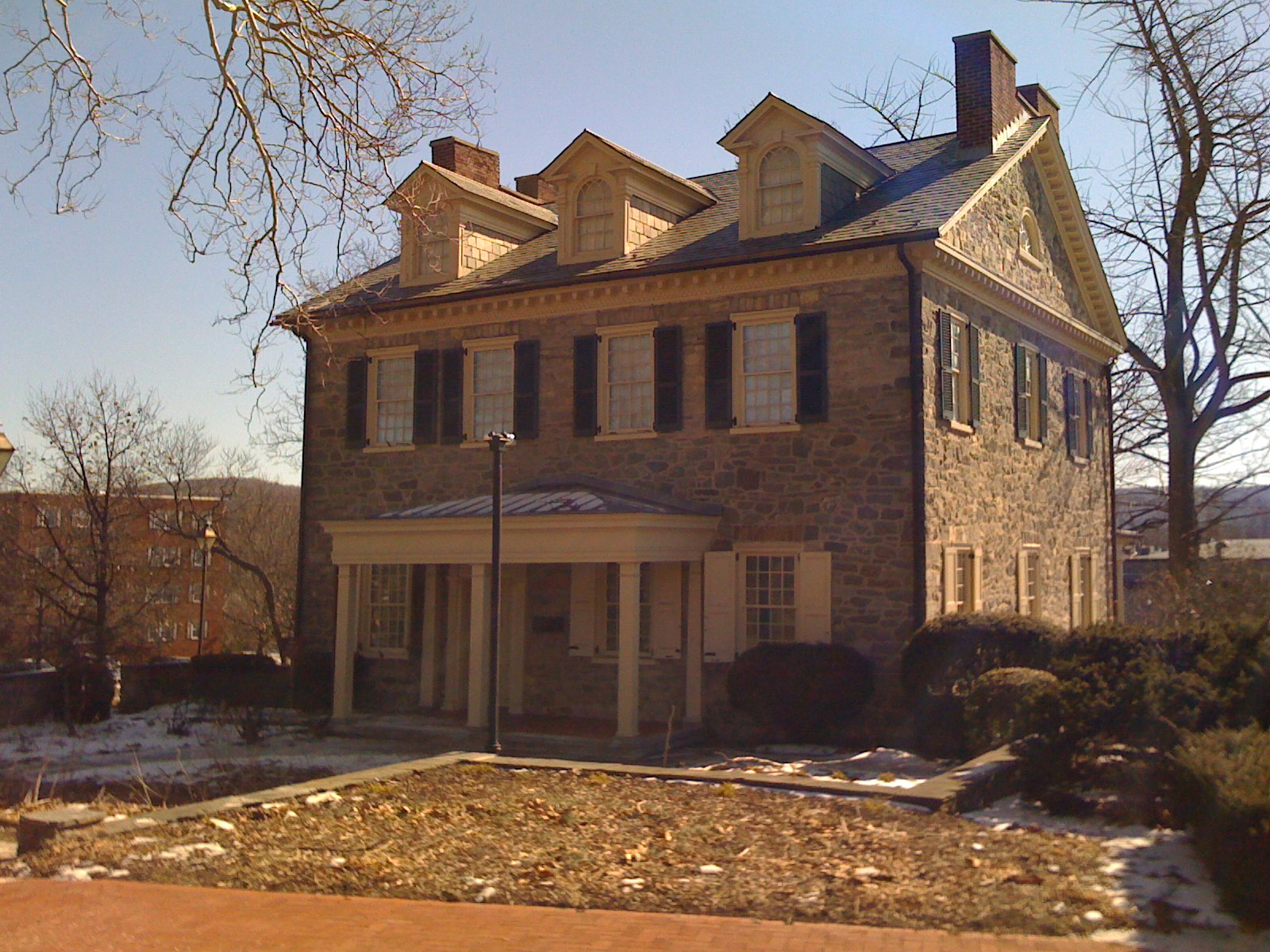
From 1867 to 1905, Muhlenberg College was located in Allentown's Trout Hall, a mansion built in 1770 by James Allen, son of William Allen. Muhlenberg's current campus opened in 1905.

Muhlenberg College was founded in 1848 in Allentown, Pennsylvania, as the Allentown Seminary by Samuel K. Brobst, a Reformed Lutheran minister. Christian Rudolph Kessler was the school's first teacher and administrator.

The college operated as the Allentown Seminary from 1848 to 1864, as the Allentown Collegiate and Military Institute from 1864 to 1867, and briefly as the Allentown Collegiate Institute in 1867.

In 1867, the college moved into Trout Hall, the former mansion of William Allen's son, James Allen, and was renamed Muhlenberg College in honor of Henry Muhlenberg, the patriarch of the Lutheran church in the United States.

From 1867 to 1876, Muhlenberg's great-grandson, Frederick Augustus Muhlenberg, was president of the college.

=== 20th century ===
In 1905, the college purchased and relocated to a 51-acre (21 ha) tract located in Allentown's West End, which continues to serve as the present-day campus.

In 1910, seeing a need for evening study in the community, the college began offering courses through a "Saturday School for Teachers". The offerings for adult education outside of the traditional baccalaureate track evolved over the years through various titles, including an "Extension" school.

=== 21st century ===
In 2002, Muhlenberg College opened The W. Clarke Wescoe School of Professional Studies.

In 2019, the college named Kathleen E. Harring, a social psychologist and the college's prior provost since 2017, as its 13th president and its first female president. She succeeded John I. Williams, Jr., the college's first black president, who was president from 2015 to 2019.

==== Pro-Palestinian campus protests ====
Muhlenberg was one of the first institutions to fire a tenured professor over pro-Palestinian speech. During the 2024 pro-Palestinian campus protests, the college fired its Jewish anthropology professor, Maura Finkelstein, for sharing a social media post by Palestinian poet Remi Kanazi who wrote, "Do not cower to Zionists. Shame them. .. Don't normalize Zionism. Don't normalize Zionists taking up space."

The college determined that Finkelstein violated its equal opportunity and nondiscrimination policies by sharing his words. In 2025, the American Association of University Professors found that the dismissal of Finkelstein, "a tenured associate professor and chair of the Department of Sociology and Anthropology..., was in violation of AAUP-supported principles and standards of academic freedom and due process...that the administration's hasty action... has severely impaired the climate for academic freedom at Muhlenberg College..., [and] that the college's equal opportunity and nondiscrimination policies... do not sufficiently protect academic freedom and due process, nor do they comport with widely accepted standards of academic governance."

== Campus ==
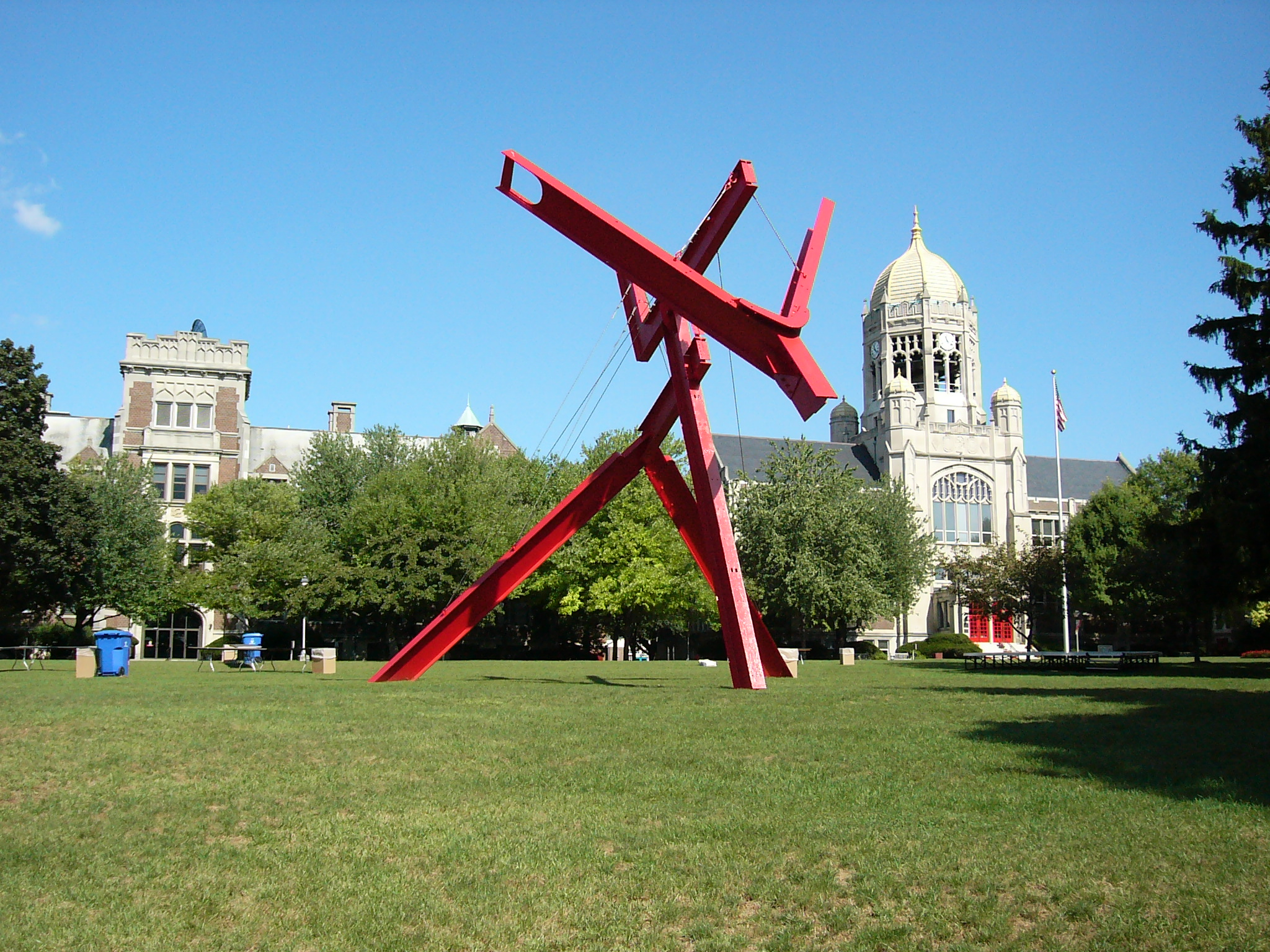
Mark di Suvero's Victor's Lament, an I-beam sculpture paying tribute to the Lehigh Valley's rich history in steelmaking (foreground in red), on the Muhlenberg College campus in September 2005

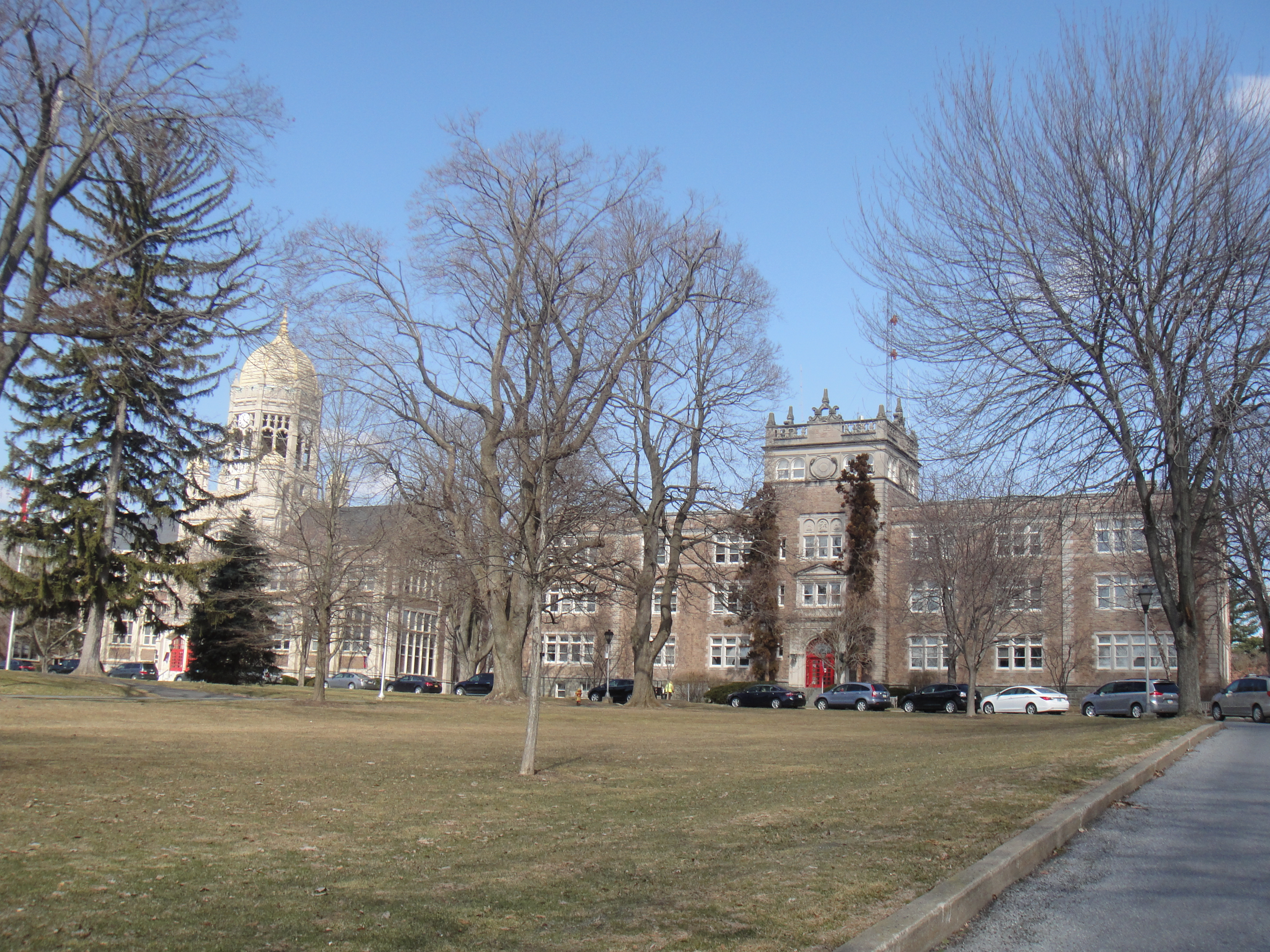
The Muhlenberg College campus in March 2014

Muhlenberg's current 82-acre (33 ha) campus is located in a residential neighborhood in Allentown's West End. The campus includes buildings with distinctive traditional European and Protestant red doors laid out on several college quads. The central part of the park-like campus is the college green, which incorporates public art, including Victor's Lament by sculptor Mark di Suvero, which incorporates a red I-beam and is a tribute to the history of steelmaking in Allentown and the surrounding Lehigh Valley during the 20th century.

The college's academic row runs the length of the main college quadrangle with Haas College Center, built between 1926 and 1929, in the center. Miller Tower, the dome and tower on top of Haas College Center, was inspired by Tom Tower at Christ Church College at the University of Oxford. It is named for David A. Miller (class of 1894), the first reporter for The Morning Call, an Allentown-based daily newspaper founded in 1883. Muhlenberg's Polling Institute teams with the newspaper to periodically publish surveys of preferences and trends among Pennsylvanians, especially in the Lehigh Valley.

In 1988, the college opened the Harry C. Trexler Library, named for local industrialist Harry Clay Trexler; it was designed by architect Robert Geddes. The library houses over 310,000 volumes and 360,000 microforms on campus, and has access to over 1.75 million electronic resources. The library is part of the Federal Depository Library Program. Near Trexler Library is the Philip Johnson-designed Baker Center for the Arts. It houses Martin Art Gallery, which has a permanent collection of over 3,000 works of art and also hosts exhibitions of pieces by student, regional, and international artists.

In August 2004, the Life Sports Center was expanded by 39,000 square feet (3,600 m^{2}), adding a new indoor field house, gymnasium, cafe, health classrooms, and a pool. In 2007, a new science building and additional residence halls were completed and opened.

In addition to its main campus in Allentown, Muhlenberg maintains a 60-acre (24 ha) Graver Arboretum, located 25 miles (40 km) away in Bushkill Township, and Raker Wildlife Preserve, a 40-acre (16 ha) wildlife sanctuary located 15 miles (24 km) away in Germansville.

== Academics ==
Muhlenberg College offers bachelor's degrees with academic focuses on liberal arts education and pre-professional studies. Approximately 85% of the faculty have a PhD or other terminal degree in their respective fields. The student to faculty ratio, as of 2018, was 11:1. The college maintains chapters of over 15 national Greek academic honor societies. Bachelor's degree programs for returning adult students are offered through the School of Continuing Education. Graduate degrees have also been offered since the 2020–21 academic year.

The college offers accelerated programs, cross-registration between disciplines, double majors, honors programs, independent study, internships, Army ROTC, student-designed majors, over 160 study-abroad programs, teacher certification, visiting and exchange student programs, and a Washington, D.C. semester.

=== Admissions ===
Academic rankings

Liberal arts
- U.S. News & World Report: 70
- Washington Monthly: 49

National
- Forbes: 350
- WSJ/College Pulse: 166

In the 2016–2017 academic year, about one-third (32%) of applicants were offered admission. In the 2013–2014 academic year, about 44% of students accepted for admission into the freshman class were in the top 10% of their high school or preparatory school graduating class, 69% in the top 20% of their graduating class, and 81% were in the top 30%. Three-quarters of the freshman class receive some form of financial aid. Muhlenberg is primarily a regional college, with 72% of incoming freshmen coming from Pennsylvania, New Jersey, or New York state. However, the school also receives applications from the West Coast, including students from Arizona, California, and Oregon.

=== Rankings ===
In its 2025 rankings, U.S. News & World Report ranked Muhlenberg College 71st among the nation's liberal arts colleges. In 2022, Forbes ranked Muhlenberg 86th on their list of liberal arts colleges in the United States. In 2024, Washington Monthly ranked Muhlenberg College 49th among 194 liberal arts colleges in the U.S. based on its contribution to the public good, as measured by social mobility, research, and promoting public service.

== Athletics ==
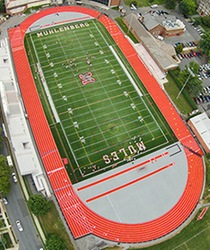
Scotty Wood Stadium on the Muhlenberg College campus in December 2017

Muhlenberg College athletic teams are known as the Muhlenberg Mules and compete in NCAA Division III. The college has 22 intercollegiate sports, which belong to either the Centennial Conference or Eastern College Athletic Conference.

Both men's and women's teams exist for basketball, cross country, golf, lacrosse, soccer, tennis, track and field, and wrestling. Men's teams exist for baseball and football; women have teams for softball, field hockey, and volleyball.

In 2004, additional athletic facilities were built west of the field house. Updated tennis courts were built in 2003 and two fields were added in 1997 and 1998. The baseball and softball teams do not have on-campus facilities. The football, field hockey, and track and field teams each perform at Scotty Wood Stadium, at 3400 West Chew Street, on the Muhlenberg College campus.

=== Football ===
==== 20th century ====
In 1900, the Muhlenberg Mules football program was founded as Muhlenberg College's first official varsity sport. Doggie Julian was its head coach from 1936 to 1944; his career record was 56–49–2. Julian was also Muhlenberg's head basketball coach during this time and the head baseball coach from 1942 to 1944.

In 1946, Ben Schwartzwalder was named head football coach. In his first season, he guided the Mules to a 9–1 record and a national championship with Muhlenberg defeating St. Bonaventure University in the Tobacco Bowl. The following year, in the 1947 season, Schwartzwalder again led the Mules to a 9–1 record; the season's only loss came by one point, in a 7–6 loss at Temple. The Mules declined an invitation that season to appear in the Tangerine Bowl.

In the 20th century, at least three Muhlenberg players went on to play in the National Football League: Sisto Averno (with the Baltimore Colts, Dallas Texans, and New York Yanks between 1950 and 1954), Charlie Copley (with the Akron Pros and Milwaukee Badgers between 1920 and 1922), and Tony Zuzzio (with the Detroit Lions in 1942).

==== 21st century ====
Since the 2000 season, Muhlenberg has compiled a 66–28 overall record in the Centennial Conference, second-best among all active and former members behind only Johns Hopkins University. The Muhlenberg football team has won the Centennial Conference championship seven times in the 2000s.

Nate Milne was named Muhlenberg's head football coach in 2018. He has since compiled a 35–5 record over his first three seasons. In 2019, Milne was named AFCA Coach of the Year Award for NCAA Division III.

=== Club teams ===
In addition to its 22 NCAA teams, Muhlenberg College has sports club teams in ultimate frisbee and women's rugby.

== Student life ==
More than 100 clubs and organizations are on campus. In addition, the Muhlenberg Activity Council is responsible for bringing events and activities to campus. The college arranges off-campus community service opportunities and intramural and club sports for students.

The college's official student-run print publication is The Muhlenberg Weekly. Established in 1883, the paper is published every week while school is in session. The student-run radio station, WMUH, which broadcasts at 91.7FM, is operated year-round by both students and volunteers from the surrounding Lehigh Valley community. It is also available online by live stream.

There are four sororities and four fraternities affiliated with the college.

Despite its Lutheran affiliation, Muhlenberg has attracted a large number of Jewish students, estimated in 2024 to be around 30% of the student body. Muhlenberg is one of only a few American liberal arts colleges to offer a Jewish studies major and minor; the Muhlenberg College Hillel is the largest student organization on campus.

== In popular culture ==
In 1998, the HBO documentary Frat House, which addresses fraternity hazing, was largely filmed at the Alpha Tau Omega fraternity at Muhlenberg. Responding to criticisms from Alpha Tau Omega, HBO never aired the documentary, though it was later released online. Frat House was awarded "Grand Jury Prize: Documentary" at the 1998 Sundance Film Festival.

== See also ==
- List of historic places in Allentown, Pennsylvania
