= 1921 Texas A&M Aggies football team =

American college football season

1921 Texas A&M Aggies football

SWC champion

Dixie Classic, W 22–14 vs. Centre
- Conference: Southwest Conference
- Record: 6–1–2 (3–0–2 SWC)
- Head coach: Dana X. Bible (4th season)
- Home stadium: Kyle Field

1921 Southwest Conference football standings
	Conf.					Overall
Team	W		L		T	W		L		T
Texas A&M $	3	–	0	–	2	6	–	1	–	2
Texas	1	–	0	–	1	6	–	1	–	1
Arkansas	2	–	1	–	0	5	–	3	–	1
Baylor	2	–	2	–	0	8	–	3	–	0
Oklahoma A&M	1	–	1	–	0	5	–	4	–	1
Rice	1	–	2	–	1	4	–	4	–	1
SMU	0	–	4	–	0	1	–	6	–	1
$ – Conference champion

The 1921 Texas A&M Aggies football team represented the Agricultural and Mechanical College of Texas—now known as Texas A&M University—as a member of the Southwest Conference (SWC) in the 1921 college football season. Led by fourth-year head coach Dana X. Bible, Texas A&M compiled an overall record of 6–1–2 with a mark of 3–0–2 in conference play, winning the SWC title. The Aggies were invited to the Dixie Classic, where they beat Centre.

== Schedule ==
Date	Opponent	Site	Result	Attendance	Source
September 30	Howard Payne*	Kyle Field; College Station, TX	W 14–7		
October 12	at SMU	Fair Park Stadium; Dallas, TX	W 13–0	8,000	
October 15	at LSU*	State Field; Baton Rouge, LA (rivalry)	L 0–6		
October 21	Arizona*	Kyle Field; College Station, TX	W 17–13		
October 28	Oklahoma A&M	Kyle Field; College Station, TX	W 23–7		
November 5	at Baylor	Cotton Palace; Waco, TX (rivalry)	W 14–3	12,500	
November 11	at Rice	Rice Field; Houston, TX	T 7–7	9,500	
November 24	Texas	Kyle Field; College Station, TX (rivalry)	T 0–0		
January 2	vs. Centre*	Fair Park Stadium; Dallas, TX (Dixie Classic)	W 22–14	20,000	
*Non-conference game
