= 1921 Michigan State Normal Normalites football team =

American college football season

1921 Michigan State Normal Normalites football
- Conference: Michigan Intercollegiate Athletic Association
- Record: 3–3 (1–2 MIAA)
- Head coach: Joseph McCulloch (1st season)
- Captain: William E. Foy

1921 Michigan Intercollegiate Athletic Association football standings
	Conf.					Overall
Team	W		L		T	W		L		T
Kalamazoo $	3	–	0	–	0	7	–	2	–	0
Albion	4	–	1	–	0	6	–	2	–	0
Hillsdale	2	–	2	–	0	5	–	3	–	0
Michigan State Normal	1	–	2	–	0	3	–	3	–	0
Olivet	1	–	3	–	0	2	–	5	–	1
Alma	1	–	4	–	0	2	–	6	–	1
$ – Conference champion

The 1921 Michigan State Normal Normalites football team was an American football team that represented Michigan State Normal College (later renamed Eastern Michigan University) as a member of the Michigan Intercollegiate Athletic Association (MIAA) during the 1921 college football season. In their first season under head coach Joseph McCulloch, the Normalites compiled a 3–3 record (1–2 against MIAA opponents) and outscored opponents by a total of 82 to 50. William E. Foy was the team captain.

== Schedule ==
Date	Opponent	Site	Result	Source
October 8	Assumption (ON)*	Ypsilanti, MI	W 48–0	
October 15	at Central Michigan*	Mount Pleasant, MI (rivalry)	W 7–6	
October 22	Alma	Ypsilanti, MI	L 0–7	
October 29	at Detroit Junior College*	Grindley Field; Detroit, MI	L 0–3	
November 12	at Hillsdale	Hillsdale, MI	W 13–7	
November 18	Albion^{†}	Ypsilanti, MI	L 14–27	
*Non-conference game; ^{†}Homecoming
