= 1921 Rice Owls football team =

American college football season

1921 Rice Owls football

TIAA champion
- Conference: Southwest Conference, Texas Intercollegiate Athletic Association
- Record: 4–4–1 (1–2–1 SWC, 3–0 TIAA)
- Head coach: Philip Arbuckle (9th season)
- Home stadium: Rice Field

1921 Southwest Conference football standings
	Conf.					Overall
Team	W		L		T	W		L		T
Texas A&M $	3	–	0	–	2	6	–	1	–	2
Texas	1	–	0	–	1	6	–	1	–	1
Arkansas	2	–	1	–	0	5	–	3	–	1
Baylor	2	–	2	–	0	8	–	3	–	0
Oklahoma A&M	1	–	1	–	0	5	–	4	–	1
Rice	1	–	2	–	1	4	–	4	–	1
SMU	0	–	4	–	0	1	–	6	–	1
$ – Conference champion

1921 Texas Intercollegiate Athletic Association football standings
	Conf.					Overall
Team	W		L		T	W		L		T
Rice $	3	–	0	–	0	4	–	4	–	1
Howard Payne	4	–	1	–	0	5	–	3	–	0
TCU	2	–	1	–	0	6	–	3	–	1
Simmons (TX)	3	–	2	–	0	6	–	4	–	0
Austin	3	–	2	–	0	5	–	4	–	0
Trinity (TX)	2	–	4	–	0	4	–	4	–	0
SMU	1	–	3	–	1	1	–	6	–	1
Daniel Baker	0	–	2	–	0	3	–	4	–	1
Southwestern (TX)	0	–	3	–	1	0	–	6	–	1
$ – Conference champion

The 1921 Rice Owls football team was an American football team that represented Rice Institute as a member of the Southwest Conference (SWC) during the 1921 college football season. In its ninth season under head coach Philip Arbuckle, the team compiled a 4–4–1 record (1–2–1 against SWC opponents) and outscored opponents by a total of 144 to 128.

== Schedule ==
Date	Opponent	Site	Result	Attendance	Source
October 1	Southwestern Louisiana*	Rice Field; Houston, TX	W 54–0	2,000	
October 8	at Baylor	Carroll Field; Waco, TX	L 14–17	5,000	
October 15	Tulane*	Rice Field; Houston, TX	L 6–7		
October 22	Southwestern (TX)	Rice Field; Houston, TX	W 28–0		
October 29	at Texas	Clark Field; Austin, TX (rivalry)	L 0–56		
November 5	SMU	Rice Field; Houston, TX (rivalry)	W 7–0		
November 11	Texas A&M	Rice Field; Houston, TX	T 7–7	9,500	
November 18	Trinity (TX)	Rice Field; Houston, TX	W 28–14		
November 24	Oklahoma*	Rice Field; Houston, TX	L 0–27		
*Non-conference game
