= 1921 Tulsa Orange and Black football team =

American college football season

1921 Tulsa Orange and Black football
- Conference: Oklahoma Intercollegiate Conference
- Record: 6–3 (5–1 OIC)
- Head coach: Francis Schmidt (3rd season)
- Home stadium: McNulty Park

The 1921 Tulsa Orange and Black football team represented the University of Tulsa during the 1921 college football season. In their third year under head coach Francis Schmidt, the Orange and Black compiled a 6–3 record and outscored their opponents by a total of 257 to 95. The team won its first two games by scores of 92–0 over East Central and 75–13 over the Chilocco Indian Agricultural School. Schmidt was later inducted into the College Football Hall of Fame.

== Schedule ==
| Date | Opponent | Site | Result | Source |
|---|---|---|---|---|
| October 1 | East Central | McNulty Park; Tulsa, OK | W 92–0 | |
| October 8 | Chilocco* | McNulty Park; Tulsa, OK | W 75–13 | |
| October 15 | Northwestern Oklahoma State | Lee Stadium; Tulsa, OK | W 17–7 | |
| October 21 | at TCU* | Panther Park; Fort Worth, TX | L 0–16 | |
| October 29 | vs. Haskell* | Kansas City, MO | L 0–21 | |
| November 4 | at Oklahoma Baptist | Shawnee, OK | W 28–0 | |
| November 11 | Central State Teachers | McNulty Park; Tulsa, OK | L 0–21 | |
| November 19 | Kingfisher | McNulty Park; Tulsa, OK | W 24–7 | |
| November 24 | Phillips | McNulty Park; Tulsa, OK | W 21–10 | |
*Non-conference game
