= 1921 Nebraska Cornhuskers football team =

American college football season

1921 Nebraska Cornhuskers football
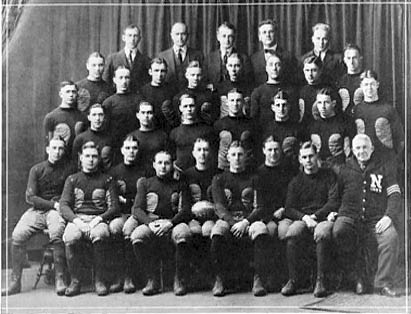

MVC champion
- Conference: Missouri Valley Conference
- Record: 7–1 (3–0 MVC)
- Head coach: Fred Dawson (1st season)
- Captain: Clarence Swanson
- Home stadium: Nebraska Field

1921 Missouri Valley Conference football standings
	Conf.					Overall
Team	W		L		T	W		L		T
Nebraska $	3	–	0	–	0	7	–	1	–	0
Kansas State	4	–	2	–	0	5	–	3	–	0
Missouri	4	–	2	–	0	6	–	2	–	0
Drake	2	–	2	–	0	5	–	2	–	0
Kansas	3	–	3	–	0	4	–	4	–	0
Iowa State	3	–	4	–	0	4	–	4	–	0
Oklahoma	2	–	3	–	0	5	–	3	–	0
Washington University	2	–	3	–	0	4	–	3	–	1
Grinnell	0	–	4	–	0	2	–	5	–	0
$ – Conference champion

The 1921 Nebraska Cornhuskers football team was an American football team that represented the University of Nebraska in the Missouri Valley Conference (MVC) during the 1921 college football season. In its first season under head coach Fred Dawson, the team compiled a 7–1 record (3–0 against conference opponents), won the MVC championship, and outscored opponents by a total of 283 to 17. The team played its home games at Nebraska Field in Lincoln, Nebraska.

== Before the season ==
Former head coach Schulte stepped down to focus on coaching other sports at Nebraska, but remained involved with the team as the lineman coach. New head coach Dawson arrived from Princeton, inheriting a team that had eighteen lettermen returning, the highest number ever for the program to date. Nebraska also rejoined the Missouri Valley Intercollegiate Athletic Association after a two-year stint as an independent, so the high number of returning starters raised aspirations for a conference title. A new league rule was enacted that restricted preseason practices to the two weeks prior to the first game, so much work was to be done after the summer break to be ready.

== Schedule ==
Date	Time	Opponent	Site	Result	Attendance	Source
October 1	2:30 p.m.	Nebraska Wesleyan*	Nebraska Field; Lincoln, NE	W 55–0		
October 15	2:30 p.m.	Haskell*	Nebraska Field; Lincoln, NE	W 41–0		
October 22	2 p.m.	at Notre Dame*	Cartier Field; Notre Dame, IN (rivalry)	L 0–7	14,000	
October 29	2:30 p.m.	Oklahoma	Nebraska Field; Lincoln, NE (rivalry)	W 44–0		
November 5	1:30 p.m.	at Pittsburgh*	Forbes Field; Pittsburgh, PA	W 10–0	10,000	
November 12	2:30 p.m.	Kansas^{†}	Nebraska Field; Lincoln, NE (rivalry)	W 28–0		
November 19	2:30 p.m.	at Iowa State	State Field; Ames, IA (rivalry)	W 35–3		
November 24	2:30 p.m.	Colorado Agricultural*	Nebraska Field; Lincoln, NE	W 70–7		
*Non-conference game; ^{†}Homecoming; All times are in Central time

== Roster ==
Berquist, Joy #2 RG; Dewitz, Herbert #10 (So.) QB; Ekeroth PLAYER; Hamilton PLAYER; Hartley, Harold #20 (Jr.) FB; Hartman, Cecil #16 FB; Hendrickson, Emil #28 T Higgins PLAYER; House, Gordon #25 C Hoy, George #8 (Jr.) HB; Klemke, George #22 E Layton, Marvin #18 (So.) FB; Lewellen, Verne #23 (So.) HB; Lyman, Roy Link #4 LT; McGlasson, Harold #13 QB; McGlasson, Ross #24 (So.) T Nixon, Byran #27 (So.) G	Noble, Dave #7 (So.) HB; Odum #14 PLAYER; Peterson, Carl #26 (So.) C Preston, Glen #15 (So.) QB; Pucelik, John #11 (Sr.)LG; Reed #17 G Russell, Robert #9 QB; Scherer, Leo #19 (Jr.) E Schoeppel, Andrew #6 (Jr.) E Swanson, Clarence #1 (Sr.)E; Thomas PLAYER; Toft PLAYER; Tripplett, Richard #30 (Jr.) E Weller, Raymond #3 (Jr.) RT; Wenke, Adolph #12 (Jr.) G Woodward PLAYER; Wright, Floyd #21 HB

== Coaching staff ==
Coach	Position	First year	Alma mater
Fred Dawson	Head coach	1921	Princeton
Henry Schulte	Line coach	1921	Michigan
Owen Frank	Backfield coach	1921	Nebraska
Bill Day	Centers coach	1921	Nebraska
Farley Young	Freshmen coach	1921	Nebraska
Jack Best	Trainer	1890	Nebraska

== Game summaries ==
=== Nebraska Wesleyan ===
Nebraska Wesleyan at Nebraska

Team	1	2	3	4	Total
Nebraska Wesleyan					0
• Nebraska					55

- Date: 1921-10-01
- Location: Nebraska Field • Lincoln, Nebraska

Nebraska Wesleyan arrived in Lincoln as Nebraska's tune up game, and nearly every player on the roster found time in the game as the Cornhuskers rolled to an easy shutout victory, as Nebraska's goal was never threatened. This was the last game between these teams, ending the 5th-oldest active series in Nebraska's history to that date, all eight games Nebraska victories dating back to 1896.

=== Haskell ===
Haskell at Nebraska

Team	1	2	3	4	Total
Haskell					0
• Nebraska					41

- Date: 1921-10-15
- Location: Nebraska Field • Lincoln, Nebraska

For the second game in a row, Nebraska brought to a close a historic series. Nebraska's run of games with Haskell was the 7th oldest active series, dating to 1901. Much like the previous game, Nebraska was never seriously threatened and posted another shutout win, bringing the Haskell series to a close with a 7–2 record.

=== Notre Dame ===
Nebraska at Notre Dame

Team	1	2	3	4	Total
Nebraska	0	0	0	0	0
• Notre Dame	0	0	7	0	7

- Date: 1921-10-22
- Location: Carter Field • Notre Dame, Indiana
- Game attendance: 14,000

Nebraska's first ever trip to South Bend, after six straight games against Notre Dame in Lincoln, continued what had become one of the marquee games of the west. The game was all about Nebraska's stingy defense and inept offense. Time after time, the Cornhuskers turned away serious goal line threats, while also failing to find the scoreboard due to fumbles, incompletions and interceptions. Knute Rockne changed his plan for the second half, to ensure Nebraska remained scoreless and banking on eventually finding points with low-risk plays, much like the previous year's game. Chet A. Wynne was among the Notre Dame players who contributed to their one successful scoring drive, and with those points the game was decided. Nebraska fell further behind in the series, to 2–4–1.

=== Oklahoma ===
Oklahoma at Nebraska

Team	1	2	3	4	Total
Oklahoma					0
• Nebraska					44

- Date: 1921-10-29
- Location: Nebraska Field • Lincoln, Nebraska
- Game weather: Rain

The Cornhuskers bounced right back from the bitter loss in South Bend by blanking the reigning conference champion Oklahoma Sooners in Lincoln, in Nebraska's first conference game since returning to the league. The win moved the Cornhuskers to 2–0–1 against Oklahoma to date.

=== Pittsburgh ===
Nebraska at Pittsburgh

Team	1	2	3	4	Total
• Nebraska					10
Pittsburgh					0

- Date: 1921-11-05
- Location: Forbes Field • Pittsburgh, Pennsylvania

Nebraska traveled to Pennsylvania for their first ever contest with Pittsburgh, known in the east as a strong team to be feared. The Cornhuskers were undaunted, taking a halftime lead and ultimately holding the Panthers scoreless for the entire game. Building on the exposure started by the 1920 victory over Rutgers the previous year, Nebraska solidified their reputation as a western powerhouse to the football fans of the east.

=== Kansas ===
Kansas at Nebraska

Team	1	2	3	4	Total
Kansas					0
• Nebraska					28

- Date: 1921-11-12
- Location: Nebraska Field • Lincoln, Nebraska

The Cornhuskers easily handled the Jayhawks at the homecoming game, never seriously threatened during the course of the game as Nebraska recorded their fifth shutout over their previous six games, and improved over Kansas 18–9–1 all time.

=== Iowa State ===
Nebraska at Iowa State

Team	1	2	3	4	Total
• Nebraska					35
Iowa State					3

- Date: 1921-11-19
- Location: Clyde Williams Field • Ames, Iowa

Iowa State fired the first shot of the game, putting up an early field goal to take a 3–0 lead, but that was last time the Cyclones would speak. The Cornhuskers ruined Iowa State's homecoming game by rolling up 35 unanswered points, finishing conference play unbeaten, and improving their dominating lead over Iowa State 13–4–1.

=== Colorado Agricultural ===
Colorado Ag at Nebraska

Team	1	2	3	4	Total
Colorado Agricultural					7
• Nebraska					70

- Date: 1921-11-24
- Location: Nebraska Field • Lincoln, Nebraska

Nebraska finished the 1921 season with force, flattening the Colorado Agricultural football squad, 70–7. Team captain Clarence Swanson had three touchdown receptions in the game, establishing a school record that was not matched until 1971. Though the Aggies managed a 4th quarter score, Nebraska's 70 points were the most they had scored against any opponent since their 100–0 victory over Nebraska Wesleyan in 1917. Colorado Agricultural was now down 0–2 against Nebraska in games played to date.

== After the season ==
Coach Dawson's first season was a clear success, with all games won except for the hard-fought Notre Dame loss, and an undisputed league championship secured in Nebraska's return to league play. The program's overall record improved to 181–61–15 (.733), while the conference record was improved to 27–3–2 (.875).
