= 1921 Wabash Little Giants football team =

American college football season

1921 Wabash Little Giants football
- Conference: Independent
- Record: 7–2
- Head coach: Robert E. Vaughan (3rd season)

1921 Midwestern college football independents records
	Conf.			Overall
Team	W	L	T	W		L		T
Detroit Junior College		–		6	–	0	–	2
Notre Dame		–		10	–	1	–	0
Creighton		–		8	–	1	–	0
Detroit		–		8	–	1	–	0
South Dakota State		–		7	–	1	–	0
Kirksville Osteopaths		–		6	–	1	–	0
Iowa State Teachers		–		5	–	1	–	1
Wabash		–		7	–	2	–	0
Central Michigan		–		7	–	2	–	1
Butler		–		6	–	2	–	0
Western State Normal		–		6	–	2	–	0
Marquette		–		6	–	2	–	1
DePauw		–		4	–	3	–	0
Haskell		–		5	–	4	–	0
Michigan Mines		–		1	–	1	–	0
North Dakota Agricultural		–		3	–	3	–	1
Saint Louis		–		4	–	4	–	1
Valparaiso		–		2	–	2	–	1
Michigan Agricultural		–		3	–	5	–	0
Northern Illinois State		–		3	–	5	–	0
Earlham		–		2	–	4	–	1
St. Ignatius (OH)		–		2	–	6	–	0
Dayton		–		1	–	7	–	1
Kent State		–		0	–	2	–	1

The 1921 Wabash Little Giants football team represented Wabash College as an independent during the 1921 college football season. In Robert E. Vaughan's third year as head coach, the Little Giants compiled a 7–2 record and outscored their opponents by a total of 146 to 31.

== Schedule ==
Date	Opponent	Site	Result	Source
September 24	Augustana (IL)	Crawfordsville, IN	W 7–0	
October 1	at Purdue	Stuart Field; West Lafayette, IN	W 9–0	
October 8	Georgetown (KY)	Crawfordsville, IN	W 41–0	
October 15	at Army	The Plain; West Point, NY	L 0–31	
October 28	at Butler	Indianapolis, IN	W 14–0	
November 5	Millikin	Crawfordsville, IN	W 14–3	
November 12	Rose Polytechnic	Crawfordsville, IN	W 39–0	
November 19	vs. DePauw	Washington Park; Indianapolis, IN	W 22–0	
November 24	at Marquette	Milwaukee, WI	L 0–7	
