= 1921 Marquette Hilltoppers football team =

American college football season

1921 Marquette Hilltoppers football
- Conference: Independent
- Record: 6–2–1
- Head coach: John J. Ryan (5th season)

1921 Midwestern college football independents records
	Conf.			Overall
Team	W	L	T	W		L		T
Detroit Junior College		–		6	–	0	–	2
Notre Dame		–		10	–	1	–	0
Creighton		–		8	–	1	–	0
Detroit		–		8	–	1	–	0
South Dakota State		–		7	–	1	–	0
Kirksville Osteopaths		–		6	–	1	–	0
Iowa State Teachers		–		5	–	1	–	1
Wabash		–		7	–	2	–	0
Central Michigan		–		7	–	2	–	1
Butler		–		6	–	2	–	0
Western State Normal		–		6	–	2	–	0
Marquette		–		6	–	2	–	1
DePauw		–		4	–	3	–	0
Haskell		–		5	–	4	–	0
Michigan Mines		–		1	–	1	–	0
North Dakota Agricultural		–		3	–	3	–	1
Saint Louis		–		4	–	4	–	1
Valparaiso		–		2	–	2	–	1
Michigan Agricultural		–		3	–	5	–	0
Northern Illinois State		–		3	–	5	–	0
Earlham		–		2	–	4	–	1
St. Ignatius (OH)		–		2	–	6	–	0
Dayton		–		1	–	7	–	1
Kent State		–		0	–	2	–	1

The 1921 Marquette Hilltoppers football team was an American football team that represented Marquette University as an independent during the 1921 college football season. In its fifth and final season under head coach John J. Ryan, the team compiled an 6–2–1 record and shut out five of its nine opponents. The team defeated Michigan Agricultural and the Haskell Indians, but lost to Knute Rockne's Notre Dame Fighting Irish.

== Schedule ==
Date	Opponent	Site	Result	Attendance	Source
October 1	Carroll (WI)	Milwaukee, WI	W 4–0		
October 8	Ripon	Milwaukee, WI	T 0–0		
October 15	Campion (WI)	Milwaukee, WI	W 55–0		
October 22	at Creighton	Omaha, NE	L 0–3	7,000	
October 29	Michigan Agricultural	Milwaukee, WI	W 7–0		
November 5	Haskell	Milwaukee, WI	W 40–2		
November 12	North Dakota	Milwaukee, WI	W 7–3		
November 19	Notre Dame	Milwaukee, WI	L 7–21	12,000	
November 24	Wabash	Milwaukee, WI	W 7–0		
