= 1921 Washington University Pikers football team =

American college football season

1921 Washington University Pikers football
- Conference: Missouri Valley Conference
- Record: 4–3–1 (2–3 MVC)
- Head coach: George Rider (2nd season)
- Home stadium: Francis Field

1921 Missouri Valley Conference football standings
	Conf.					Overall
Team	W		L		T	W		L		T
Nebraska $	3	–	0	–	0	7	–	1	–	0
Kansas State	4	–	2	–	0	5	–	3	–	0
Missouri	4	–	2	–	0	6	–	2	–	0
Drake	2	–	2	–	0	5	–	2	–	0
Kansas	3	–	3	–	0	4	–	4	–	0
Iowa State	3	–	4	–	0	4	–	4	–	0
Oklahoma	2	–	3	–	0	5	–	3	–	0
Washington University	2	–	3	–	0	4	–	3	–	1
Grinnell	0	–	4	–	0	2	–	5	–	0
$ – Conference champion

The 1921 Washington University Pikers football team represented Washington University in St. Louis as a member of the Missouri Valley Conference (MVC) during the 1921 college football season. Led by second-year George Rider, the Pikers compiled an overall record of 4–3–1 with a mark of 2–3 in conference play, tying for seventh place in the MVC. Washington University played home games at Francis Field in St. Louis.

== Schedule ==
Date	Time	Opponent	Site	Result	Attendance	Source
October 1		Missouri Mines*	Francis Field; St. Louis, MO	W 10–0	3,000	
October 8	2:30 p.m.	at Kansas State	Ahearn Field; Manhattan, KS	L 0–21		
October 15	3:00 p.m.	Grinnell	Francis Field; St. Louis, MO	W 14–13	3,500	
October 22	2:30 p.m.	at Oklahoma	Boyd Field; Norman, OK	L 13–28	7,000	
October 29		Iowa State	Francis Field; St. Louis, MO	W 2–0	5,000	
November 5	2:30 p.m.	Missouri	Francis Field; St. Louis, MO	L 0–7	12,000	
November 12	2:30 p.m.	Tulane*	Francis Field; St. Louis, MO	W 14–6	4,000	
November 24	2:00 p.m.	at Saint Louis*	Sportsman's Park; St. Louis, MO	T 0–0	14,000	
*Non-conference game; All times are in Central time
