= Paul Harrison (1920s American football coach) =

American football and baseball coach

Playing career

Football
- 1914–1916: Northern Illinois State
- Positions: Tackle, fullback

Coaching career (HC unless noted)

Football
- 1920–1922: Northern Illinois State

Baseball
- 1921–1923: Northern Illinois State

Head coaching record
- Overall: 11–14–1 (football); 11–13–1 (baseball)

Paul Harrison was an American football and baseball coach. He served as the head football coach at Northern Illinois University from 1920 to 1922, compiling a record of 11–14–1. Harrison was also the head baseball coach at Northern Illinois from 1921 to 1923, tallying a mark of 11–13–1.

== Head coaching record ==
=== Football ===
Year	Team	Overall	Conference	Standing	Bowl/playoffs
Northern Illinois State Normal/Teachers (Independent) (1920–1921)
1920	Northern Illinois State Normal	3–5			
1921	Northern Illinois State	3–5			
Northern Illinois State Teachers (Illinois Intercollegiate Athletic Conference) (1922)
1922	Northern Illinois State	5–4–1	3–1–1		
Northern Illinois State:		11–14–1	3–1–1		
Total:		11–14–1			
