= 1921 South Dakota State Jackrabbits football team =

American college football season

1921 South Dakota State Jackrabbits football
- Conference: Independent
- Record: 7–1
- Head coach: Charles A. West (3rd season)

1921 Midwestern college football independents records
	Conf.			Overall
Team	W	L	T	W		L		T
Detroit Junior College		–		6	–	0	–	2
Notre Dame		–		10	–	1	–	0
Creighton		–		8	–	1	–	0
Detroit		–		8	–	1	–	0
South Dakota State		–		7	–	1	–	0
Kirksville Osteopaths		–		6	–	1	–	0
Iowa State Teachers		–		5	–	1	–	1
Wabash		–		7	–	2	–	0
Central Michigan		–		7	–	2	–	1
Butler		–		6	–	2	–	0
Western State Normal		–		6	–	2	–	0
Marquette		–		6	–	2	–	1
DePauw		–		4	–	3	–	0
Haskell		–		5	–	4	–	0
Michigan Mines		–		1	–	1	–	0
North Dakota Agricultural		–		3	–	3	–	1
Saint Louis		–		4	–	4	–	1
Valparaiso		–		2	–	2	–	1
Michigan Agricultural		–		3	–	5	–	0
Northern Illinois State		–		3	–	5	–	0
Earlham		–		2	–	4	–	1
St. Ignatius (OH)		–		2	–	6	–	0
Dayton		–		1	–	7	–	1
Kent State		–		0	–	2	–	1

The 1921 South Dakota State Jackrabbits football team was an American football team that represented South Dakota State University as an independent during the 1921 college football season. In its third season under head coach Charles A. West, the team compiled a 7–1 record and outscored opponents by a total of 255 to 38.

== Schedule ==
Date	Opponent	Site	Result	Source
October 1	Northern State	Brookings, SD	W 40–0	
October 8	at Wisconsin	Camp Randall Stadium; Madison, WI	L 3–24	
October 15	Huron	Brookings, SD	W 60–0	
October 22	at North Dakota Agricultural	Dacotah Field; Fargo, ND (rivalry)	W 54–0	
October 29	at Yankton	Watertown, SD	W 53–0	
November 5	North Dakota	Brookings, SD	W 27–14	
November 12	at South Dakota	Vermillion, SD (rivalry)	W 9–0	
November 19	at Creighton	Omaha, NE	W 7–0	
