= 1922 Northern Illinois State Teachers football team =

American college football season

1922 Northern Illinois State Teachers football
- Conference: Illinois Intercollegiate Athletic Conference
- Record: 5–4–1 (3–1–1 IIAC)
- Head coach: Paul Harrison (3rd season)
- Captain: Leo Conahan
- Home stadium: Glidden Field

1922 Illinois Intercollegiate Athletic Conference football standings
	Conf.					Overall
Team	W		L		T	W		L		T
Lombard +	3	–	0	–	0	7	–	0	–	2
Eastern Illinois	3	–	0	–	2	4	–	0	–	2
Shurtleff	4	–	1	–	1	4	–	1	–	1
Illinois Wesleyan	6	–	2	–	0	6	–	3	–	0
Northern Illinois State	3	–	1	–	1	5	–	4	–	1
Western Illinois	2	–	1	–	0	5	–	3	–	0
Eureka	4	–	3	–	0	5	–	3	–	0
Carthage	2	–	2	–	0	5	–	4	–	0
Lake Forest	0	–	0	–	1	4	–	3	–	2
McKendree	1	–	1	–	1	1	–	1	–	2
Mount Morris	1	–	1	–	0	3	–	3	–	0
Millikin	2	–	2	–	1	3	–	4	–	2
Monmouth (IL)	2	–	4	–	0	2	–	6	–	0
Knox (IL)	1	–	3	–	0	2	–	7	–	0
Illinois State Normal	1	–	3	–	3	1	–	4	–	3
Lincoln (IL)	1	–	3	–	0	1	–	5	–	0
Augustana (IL)	1	–	5	–	0	1	–	8	–	0
St. Viator	0	–	1	–	0	3	–	4	–	1
Wheaton (IL)	0	–	3	–	0	2	–	5	–	0
Southern Illinois	0	–	3	–	0	1	–	6	–	0
Illinois College	?	–	?	–	?	5	–	4	–	0
Blackburn	?	–	?	–	?	1	–	4	–	1
$ – Conference champion

The 1922 Northern Illinois State Teachers football team represented Northern Illinois State Teachers College in the 1922 college football season. The team competed in the Illinois Intercollegiate Athletic Conference, which was also known as the Little Nineteen; it was the first season they competed in a conference. They were led by third-year head coach Paul Harrison and played their home games at Glidden Field, located on the east end of campus. The Teachers finished the season with a 5–4–1 record and a 3–1–1 record in conference play. Leo Conahan was the team's captain.

== Schedule ==
Date	Opponent	Site	Result	Source
September 23	Elmhurst*	Glidden Field; DeKalb, IL	W 45–0	
September 30	at Beloit*	Beloit, WI	L 0–34	
October 7	at North-Western College	Naperville, IL	W 6–3	
October 14	Whitewater Normal*	Glidden Field; DeKalb, IL	L 6–20	
October 21	at Mount Morris	Mount Morris, IL	W 13–7	
October 28	at Millikin	Decatur, IL	L 0–15	
November 3	Wisconsin Mines*	Glidden Field; DeKalb, IL	W 20–7	
November 11	at Illinois State Normal	Normal, IL	T 0–0	
November 17	at Milwaukee Normal*	Milwaukee, WI	L 6–12	
November 25	Wheaton (IL)	Glidden Field; DeKalb, IL	W 37–0	
*Non-conference game
