= 1921 Detroit Titans football team =

American college football season

1921 Detroit Titans football
- Conference: Independent
- Record: 8–1
- Head coach: James F. Duffy (4th season)
- Home stadium: Navin Field

1921 Midwestern college football independents records
	Conf.			Overall
Team	W	L	T	W		L		T
Detroit Junior College		–		6	–	0	–	2
Notre Dame		–		10	–	1	–	0
Creighton		–		8	–	1	–	0
Detroit		–		8	–	1	–	0
South Dakota State		–		7	–	1	–	0
Kirksville Osteopaths		–		6	–	1	–	0
Iowa State Teachers		–		5	–	1	–	1
Wabash		–		7	–	2	–	0
Central Michigan		–		7	–	2	–	1
Butler		–		6	–	2	–	0
Western State Normal		–		6	–	2	–	0
Marquette		–		6	–	2	–	1
DePauw		–		4	–	3	–	0
Haskell		–		5	–	4	–	0
Michigan Mines		–		1	–	1	–	0
North Dakota Agricultural		–		3	–	3	–	1
Saint Louis		–		4	–	4	–	1
Valparaiso		–		2	–	2	–	1
Michigan Agricultural		–		3	–	5	–	0
Northern Illinois State		–		3	–	5	–	0
Earlham		–		2	–	4	–	1
St. Ignatius (OH)		–		2	–	6	–	0
Dayton		–		1	–	7	–	1
Kent State		–		0	–	2	–	1

The 1921 Detroit Titans football team represented the University of Detroit in the 1921 college football season. Detroit shut out seven of nine opponents, outscored all opponents by a combined total of 245 to 24, and finished with an 8–1 record in their fourth year under head coach James F. Duffy. The team was undefeated during its regular season. After the season end, a post-season playoff game was scheduled between Detroit and another undefeated team, Washington & Jefferson, with the winner to play in the 1922 Rose Bowl. Washington & Jefferson defeated Detroit, 14–2, and was later recognized as co-national champion.

In addition to head coach Duffy, the coaching staff included assistant coaches James M. Brown and E. Britt Patterson, trainer Harry H. Crowley, team physician William E. Keane, and publicity director Edward A. Batchelor.

The team included Gus Sonnenberg who went on to play eight seasons in the National Football League.

== Schedule ==
Date	Time	Opponent	Site	Result	Attendance	Source
October 1		Franklin (IN)	Mack Park; Detroit, MI	W 35–0		
October 8		Ohio Northern	Navin Field; Detroit, MI	W 35–0		
October 15		West Virginia Wesleyan	Navin Field; Detroit, MI	W 55–0		
October 22		at Boston College	Braves Field; Boston, MA	W 28–0		
October 29		Tulane	Navin Field; Detroit, MI	W 14–10		
November 5	2:30 p.m.	Springfield	Navin Field; Detroit, MI	W 21–0	12,000	
November 12		Marietta	Navin Field; Detroit, MI	W 34–0		
November 24		Vermont	Navin Field; Detroit, MI	W 21–0		
December 3		Washington & Jefferson	Navin Field; Detroit, MI	L 2–14	22,000	
All times are in Eastern time
