= 1921 University of Dayton football team =

American college football season

1921 Dayton football
- Conference: Independent
- Record: 1–7–1
- Head coach: Charley Way (1st season; first 8 games); Bud Talbott (2nd season, final game)
- Home stadium: Varsity Field

1921 Midwestern college football independents records
	Conf.			Overall
Team	W	L	T	W		L		T
Detroit Junior College		–		6	–	0	–	2
Notre Dame		–		10	–	1	–	0
Creighton		–		8	–	1	–	0
Detroit		–		8	–	1	–	0
South Dakota State		–		7	–	1	–	0
Kirksville Osteopaths		–		6	–	1	–	0
Iowa State Teachers		–		5	–	1	–	1
Wabash		–		7	–	2	–	0
Central Michigan		–		7	–	2	–	1
Butler		–		6	–	2	–	0
Western State Normal		–		6	–	2	–	0
Marquette		–		6	–	2	–	1
DePauw		–		4	–	3	–	0
Haskell		–		5	–	4	–	0
Michigan Mines		–		1	–	1	–	0
North Dakota Agricultural		–		3	–	3	–	1
Saint Louis		–		4	–	4	–	1
Valparaiso		–		2	–	2	–	1
Michigan Agricultural		–		3	–	5	–	0
Northern Illinois State		–		3	–	5	–	0
Earlham		–		2	–	4	–	1
St. Ignatius (OH)		–		2	–	6	–	0
Dayton		–		1	–	7	–	1
Kent State		–		0	–	2	–	1

The 1921 Dayton football team was an American football team that represented the University of Dayton as an independent during the 1921 college football season. Under head coaches Charley Way and Bud Talbott, the team compiled a 1–7–1 record.

== Schedule ==
Date	Opponent	Site	Result	Source
October 1	at Miami (OH)	Miami Field; Oxford, OH	L 0–55	
October 8	St. Xavier	Dayton, OH	L 0–13	
October 15	Wilmington	Dayton, OH	L 0–30	
October 22	at Bethany (WV)	Wheeling, WV	L 0–78	
October 29	at Muskingum	Cambridge, OH	L 6–35	
November 5	at Earlham	Reid Field; Richmond, IN	T 14–14	
November 12	at Baldwin-Wallace	Berea, OH	L 0–7	
November 19	at Hanover	Hanover, IN	L 0–3	
November 26	St. Ignatius (OH)	South Park Field; Dayton, OH	W 13–6	
