= 1921 Northern Illinois State Teachers football team =

American college football season

1921 Northern Illinois State Teachers football
- Conference: Independent
- Record: 3–5
- Head coach: Paul Harrison (2nd season)
- Captain: Allan Newman
- Home stadium: Glidden Field

1921 Midwestern college football independents records
	Conf.			Overall
Team	W	L	T	W		L		T
Detroit Junior College		–		6	–	0	–	2
Notre Dame		–		10	–	1	–	0
Creighton		–		8	–	1	–	0
Detroit		–		8	–	1	–	0
South Dakota State		–		7	–	1	–	0
Kirksville Osteopaths		–		6	–	1	–	0
Iowa State Teachers		–		5	–	1	–	1
Wabash		–		7	–	2	–	0
Central Michigan		–		7	–	2	–	1
Butler		–		6	–	2	–	0
Western State Normal		–		6	–	2	–	0
Marquette		–		6	–	2	–	1
DePauw		–		4	–	3	–	0
Haskell		–		5	–	4	–	0
Michigan Mines		–		1	–	1	–	0
North Dakota Agricultural		–		3	–	3	–	1
Saint Louis		–		4	–	4	–	1
Valparaiso		–		2	–	2	–	1
Michigan Agricultural		–		3	–	5	–	0
Northern Illinois State		–		3	–	5	–	0
Earlham		–		2	–	4	–	1
St. Ignatius (OH)		–		2	–	6	–	0
Dayton		–		1	–	7	–	1
Kent State		–		0	–	2	–	1

The 1921 Northern Illinois State Teachers football team represented Northern Illinois State Teachers College as an independent in the 1921 college football season. They were led by second-year head coach Paul Harrison and played their home games at Glidden Field, located on the east end of campus. The Teachers finished the season with a 3–5 record. Allan Newman was the team's captain.

== Schedule ==
Date	Opponent	Site	Result	Source
September 29	at Elgin Academy	Elgin, IL	W 21–0	
October 8	Millikin	Glidden Field; DeKalb, IL	L 0–63	
October 15	at Bradley	Peoria, IL	L 0–41	
October 22	Mount Morris	Glidden Field; DeKalb, IL	W 64–9	
October 28	at St. Viator	Bourbonnais, IL	L 10–19	
November 5	Elmhurst	Glidden Field; DeKalb, IL	W 90–0	
November 11	Milwaukee Normal	Glidden Field; DeKalb, IL	L 0–20	
November 19	at Wheaton (IL)	Wheaton, IL	L 7–10	
