= 1921 TCU Horned Frogs football team =

American college football season

1921 TCU Horned Frogs football
- Conference: Texas Intercollegiate Athletic Association
- Record: 6–3–1 (2–1 TIAA)
- Head coach: William L. Driver (2nd season)
- Captain: Chester Fowler
- Home stadium: Panther Park

1921 Texas Intercollegiate Athletic Association football standings
	Conf.					Overall
Team	W		L		T	W		L		T
Rice $	3	–	0	–	0	4	–	4	–	1
Howard Payne	4	–	1	–	0	5	–	3	–	0
TCU	2	–	1	–	0	6	–	3	–	1
Simmons (TX)	3	–	2	–	0	6	–	4	–	0
Austin	3	–	2	–	0	5	–	4	–	0
Trinity (TX)	2	–	4	–	0	4	–	4	–	0
SMU	1	–	3	–	1	1	–	6	–	1
Daniel Baker	0	–	2	–	0	3	–	4	–	1
Southwestern (TX)	0	–	3	–	1	0	–	6	–	1
$ – Conference champion

The 1921 TCU Horned Frogs football team represented Texas Christian University (TCU) as a member of the Texas Intercollegiate Athletic Association (TIAA) during the 1921 college football season. Led by William L. Driver in his second and final year as head coach, the Horned Frogs compiled an overall record of 6–3–1 with a mark of 2–1 in TIAA play. TCU played their home games at Panther Park in Fort Worth, Texas. The team's captain was Chester Fowler, who played halfback.

== Schedule ==
Date	Time	Opponent	Site	Result	Attendance	Source
September 24	2:30 p.m.	at West Texas State*	Canyon, TX	W 30–0		
October 1		at Simmons (TX)	West Texas fair grounds; Abilene, TX	L 7–10	5,000	
October 8		at Oklahoma A&M*	Lewis Field; Stillwater, OK	L 21–28	3,000	
October 15		Trinity (TX)	Panther Park; Fort Worth, TX	W 19–3		
October 21		Tulsa*	Panther Park; Fort Worth, TX	W 16–0		
October 29		at Phillips*	Alton Field; Enid, OK	T 0–0		
November 4	3:00 p.m.	Kirksville Osteopaths*	Panther Park; Fort Worth, TX	W 7–0		
November 11		at SMU	Fair Park Stadium; Dallas, TX (rivalry)	W 13–6		
November 18	3:00 p.m.	Haskell*	Panther Park; Fort Worth, TX	L 0–14		
November 24	2:30 p.m.	Arkansas*	Panther Park; Fort Worth, TX	W 19–14		
*Non-conference game; All times are in Central time
