= 1921 Kansas Jayhawks football team =

American college football season

1921 Kansas Jayhawks football
- Conference: Missouri Valley Conference
- Record: 4–3 (3–3 MVC)
- Head coach: Potsy Clark (1st season)
- Captain: Paul Jones
- Home stadium: Haskell Field, Memorial Stadium

1921 Missouri Valley Conference football standings
	Conf.					Overall
Team	W		L		T	W		L		T
Nebraska $	3	–	0	–	0	7	–	1	–	0
Kansas State	4	–	2	–	0	5	–	3	–	0
Missouri	4	–	2	–	0	6	–	2	–	0
Drake	2	–	2	–	0	5	–	2	–	0
Kansas	3	–	3	–	0	4	–	4	–	0
Iowa State	3	–	4	–	0	4	–	4	–	0
Oklahoma	2	–	3	–	0	5	–	3	–	0
Washington University	2	–	3	–	0	4	–	3	–	1
Grinnell	0	–	4	–	0	2	–	5	–	0
$ – Conference champion

The 1921 Kansas Jayhawks football team represented the University of Kansas as a member of the Missouri Valley Conference (MVC) during the 1921 college football season. In their first season under head coach Potsy Clark, the Jayhawks compiled an overall record of 4–3 with a mark of 3–3 against conference opponents, finished in fifth place in the MVC, and were outscored by opponents by a combined total of 97 to 92. Kansas played its first home game of the season, against Drake in October 15, then moved to the newly opened Memorial Stadium in Lawrence, Kansas for the rest of the season. Paul Jones was the team captain.

== Schedule ==
Date	Opponent	Site	Result	Source
October 1	at Washburn*	Emporia, KS	W 28–7	
October 15	Drake	Haskell Field; Lawrence, KS	L 7–15	
October 22	at Iowa State	State Field; Ames, IA	W 14–7	
October 29	Kansas State	Memorial Stadium; Lawrence, KS (Sunflower Showdown)	W 21–7	
November 5	at Oklahoma	Boyd Field; Norman, OK	L 7–24	
November 12	at Nebraska	Nebraska Field; Lincoln, NE (rivalry)	L 0–28	
November 24	Missouri^{†}	Memorial Stadium; Lawrence, KS (Border War)	W 15–9	
*Non-conference game; ^{†}Homecoming
