= 1921 DePauw Tigers football team =

American college football season

1921 DePauw Tigers football
- Conference: Independent
- Record: 4–3
- Head coach: Fred M. Walker (1st season)
- Home stadium: McKeen Field

1921 Midwestern college football independents records
	Conf.			Overall
Team	W	L	T	W		L		T
Detroit Junior College		–		6	–	0	–	2
Notre Dame		–		10	–	1	–	0
Creighton		–		8	–	1	–	0
Detroit		–		8	–	1	–	0
South Dakota State		–		7	–	1	–	0
Kirksville Osteopaths		–		6	–	1	–	0
Iowa State Teachers		–		5	–	1	–	1
Wabash		–		7	–	2	–	0
Central Michigan		–		7	–	2	–	1
Butler		–		6	–	2	–	0
Western State Normal		–		6	–	2	–	0
Marquette		–		6	–	2	–	1
DePauw		–		4	–	3	–	0
Haskell		–		5	–	4	–	0
Michigan Mines		–		1	–	1	–	0
North Dakota Agricultural		–		3	–	3	–	1
Saint Louis		–		4	–	4	–	1
Valparaiso		–		2	–	2	–	1
Michigan Agricultural		–		3	–	5	–	0
Northern Illinois State		–		3	–	5	–	0
Earlham		–		2	–	4	–	1
St. Ignatius (OH)		–		2	–	6	–	0
Dayton		–		1	–	7	–	1
Kent State		–		0	–	2	–	1

The 1921 DePauw Tigers football team was an American football team that represented DePauw University as an independent during the 1921 college football season. Under first-year head coach Fred "Mysterious" Walker, the team compiled a 4–3 record and outscored opponents by a total of 167 to 107. Its losses included games against Knute Rockne's Notre Dame and Robert Zuppke's Illinois teams.

The team played its home games at McKeen Field in Greencastle, Indiana. Enrollment at DePauw in 1921 was approximately 1,200 students.

== Schedule ==
Date	Opponent	Site	Result	Attendance	Source
October 1	at Notre Dame	Cartier Field; Notre Dame, IN	L 10–57	8,000	
October 8	Transylvania	McKeen Field; Greencastle, IN	W 28–0		
October 15	Valparaiso	Greencastle, IN	W 41–0		
October 22	at Saint Louis	Sportsman's Park; St. Louis, MO	W 21–7	5,000	
October 29	Georgetown (KY)	Greencastle, IN	W 67–0		
November 5	at Illinois	Urbana, IL	L 0–21	5,814	
November 19	vs. Wabash	Washington Park; Indianapolis, IN	L 0–22		
