= 1921 Haskell Indians football team =

American college football season

1921 Haskell Indians football
- Conference: Independent
- Record: 5–4
- Head coach: Matty Bell (2nd season)
- Home stadium: Haskell Field

1921 Midwestern college football independents records
	Conf.			Overall
Team	W	L	T	W		L		T
Detroit Junior College		–		6	–	0	–	2
Notre Dame		–		10	–	1	–	0
Creighton		–		8	–	1	–	0
Detroit		–		8	–	1	–	0
South Dakota State		–		7	–	1	–	0
Kirksville Osteopaths		–		6	–	1	–	0
Iowa State Teachers		–		5	–	1	–	1
Wabash		–		7	–	2	–	0
Central Michigan		–		7	–	2	–	1
Butler		–		6	–	2	–	0
Western State Normal		–		6	–	2	–	0
Marquette		–		6	–	2	–	1
DePauw		–		4	–	3	–	0
Haskell		–		5	–	4	–	0
Michigan Mines		–		1	–	1	–	0
North Dakota Agricultural		–		3	–	3	–	1
Saint Louis		–		4	–	4	–	1
Valparaiso		–		2	–	2	–	1
Michigan Agricultural		–		3	–	5	–	0
Northern Illinois State		–		3	–	5	–	0
Earlham		–		2	–	4	–	1
St. Ignatius (OH)		–		2	–	6	–	0
Dayton		–		1	–	7	–	1
Kent State		–		0	–	2	–	1

The 1921 Haskell Indians football team was an American football team that represented the Haskell Institute (later renamed Haskell Indian Nations University) as an independent during the 1921 college football season. In its second and final season under head coach Matty Bell, the team compiled a 5–4 record.

== Schedule ==
Date	Time	Opponent	Site	Result	Attendance	Source
September 23		at Pittsburg Normal	Pittburg, KS	W 14–0		
September 30		Kansas Wesleyan	Haskell Field; Lawrence, KS	W 89–0		
October 15		at Nebraska	Nebraska Field; Lincoln, NE	L 0–42		
October 22		at Friends	Haskell Field; Lawrence, KS	W 14–7		
October 29		vs. Tulsa	Kansas City, MO	W 21–0		
November 5		at Marquette	Milwaukee, WI	L 2–40		
November 12		at Notre Dame	Cartier Field; South Bend, IN	L 7–42		
November 18	3:00 p.m.	at TCU	Panther Park; Fort Worth, TX	W 14–0		
November 26		vs. Des Moines	Kansas City, MO	L 7–24		
All times are in Central time
