= 1921 Iowa State Cyclones football team =

American college football season

1921 Iowa State Cyclones football
- Conference: Missouri Valley Conference
- Record: 4–4 (3–4 MVC)
- Head coach: Maury Kent (1st season)
- Captain: Polly Wallace
- Home stadium: State Field

1921 Missouri Valley Conference football standings
	Conf.					Overall
Team	W		L		T	W		L		T
Nebraska $	3	–	0	–	0	7	–	1	–	0
Kansas State	4	–	2	–	0	5	–	3	–	0
Missouri	4	–	2	–	0	6	–	2	–	0
Drake	2	–	2	–	0	5	–	2	–	0
Kansas	3	–	3	–	0	4	–	4	–	0
Iowa State	3	–	4	–	0	4	–	4	–	0
Oklahoma	2	–	3	–	0	5	–	3	–	0
Washington University	2	–	3	–	0	4	–	3	–	1
Grinnell	0	–	4	–	0	2	–	5	–	0
$ – Conference champion

The 1921 Iowa State Cyclones football team represented Iowa State College of Agricultural and Mechanic Arts (later renamed Iowa State University) in the Missouri Valley Conference during the 1921 college football season. In their first and only season under head coach Maury Kent, the Cyclones compiled a 4–4 record (3–4 against conference opponents), finished in sixth place in the conference, and outscored opponents by a combined total of 87 to 74. They played their home games at State Field in Ames, Iowa. Polly Wallace was the team captain.

== Schedule ==
Date	Time	Opponent	Site	Result	Attendance	Source
October 1	2:30 pm	Coe*	State Field; Ames, IA	W 28–3		
October 8		Grinnell	State Field; Ames, IA	W 21–3		
October 15		at Missouri	Rollins Field; Columbia, MO (rivalry)	L 14–17		
October 22		Kansas	State Field; Ames, IA	L 7–14		
October 29	3:00 pm	at Washington University	Francis Field; St. Louis, MO	L 0–2	5,000	
November 5	2:30 pm	at Drake	Drake Stadium; Des Moines, IA	W 7–0		
November 11	2:30 pm	Kansas State	State Field; Ames, IA (rivalry)	W 7–0		
November 19	2:30 pm	Nebraska^{†}	State Field; Ames, IA (rivalry)	L 3–35		
*Non-conference game; ^{†}Homecoming
