= 1921 Kirksville Osteopaths football team =

American college football season

1921 Kirksville Osteopaths football
- Conference: Independent
- Record: 6–1
- Head coach: Ray Sermon (1st season)
- Home stadium: Kirk Athletic Field

1921 Midwestern college football independents records
	Conf.			Overall
Team	W	L	T	W		L		T
Detroit Junior College		–		6	–	0	–	2
Notre Dame		–		10	–	1	–	0
Creighton		–		8	–	1	–	0
Detroit		–		8	–	1	–	0
South Dakota State		–		7	–	1	–	0
Kirksville Osteopaths		–		6	–	1	–	0
Iowa State Teachers		–		5	–	1	–	1
Wabash		–		7	–	2	–	0
Central Michigan		–		7	–	2	–	1
Butler		–		6	–	2	–	0
Western State Normal		–		6	–	2	–	0
Marquette		–		6	–	2	–	1
DePauw		–		4	–	3	–	0
Haskell		–		5	–	4	–	0
Michigan Mines		–		1	–	1	–	0
North Dakota Agricultural		–		3	–	3	–	1
Saint Louis		–		4	–	4	–	1
Valparaiso		–		2	–	2	–	1
Michigan Agricultural		–		3	–	5	–	0
Northern Illinois State		–		3	–	5	–	0
Earlham		–		2	–	4	–	1
St. Ignatius (OH)		–		2	–	6	–	0
Dayton		–		1	–	7	–	1
Kent State		–		0	–	2	–	1

The 1921 Kirksville Osteopaths football team was an American football team that represented the American School of Osteopathy—now known as A.T. Still University—as an independent during the 1921 college football season. Led by first-yead head coach Ray Sermon, the team compiled a record 6–1.

== Schedule ==
Date	Time	Opponent	Site	Result	Attendance	Source
October 7		Chillicothe Business College (MO)	Kirksville, MO	W 41–0		
October 13		at Missouri Military Academy	Mexico, MO	W 33–0		
October 21	2:30 p.m.	Kirksville	Kirk Athletic Field; Kirksville, MO	W 28–6	2,500	
October 29		St. Ambrose	Kirksville, MO	W 20–0		
November 4		at TCU	Panther Park; Fort Worth, TX	L 0–7		
November 12		Lake Forest	Kirk Athletic Field; Kirksville, MO	W 42–7		
November 19		Central (IA)	Kirk Athletic Field; Kirksville, MO	W 21–0		
All times are in Central time
