= 1921 Earlham Quakers football team =

American college football season

1921 Earlham Quakers football
- Conference: Independent
- Record: 2–4–1
- Head coach: Ray Mowe (3rd season)

1921 Midwestern college football independents records
	Conf.			Overall
Team	W	L	T	W		L		T
Detroit Junior College		–		6	–	0	–	2
Notre Dame		–		10	–	1	–	0
Creighton		–		8	–	1	–	0
Detroit		–		8	–	1	–	0
South Dakota State		–		7	–	1	–	0
Kirksville Osteopaths		–		6	–	1	–	0
Iowa State Teachers		–		5	–	1	–	1
Wabash		–		7	–	2	–	0
Central Michigan		–		7	–	2	–	1
Butler		–		6	–	2	–	0
Western State Normal		–		6	–	2	–	0
Marquette		–		6	–	2	–	1
DePauw		–		4	–	3	–	0
Haskell		–		5	–	4	–	0
Michigan Mines		–		1	–	1	–	0
North Dakota Agricultural		–		3	–	3	–	1
Saint Louis		–		4	–	4	–	1
Valparaiso		–		2	–	2	–	1
Michigan Agricultural		–		3	–	5	–	0
Northern Illinois State		–		3	–	5	–	0
Earlham		–		2	–	4	–	1
St. Ignatius (OH)		–		2	–	6	–	0
Dayton		–		1	–	7	–	1
Kent State		–		0	–	2	–	1

The 1921 Earlham Quakers football team represented Earlham College as an independent during the 1921 college football season. Led by third-year head coach Ray Mowe, the Quakers compiled a record of 2–4–1. A game with Rose Poly was cancelled.

== Schedule ==
Date	Time	Opponent	Site	Result	Source
October 1		at Hanover	Hanover, IN	W 14–7	
October 8		Wilmington (OH)	Richmond, IN	L 0–6	
October 22		at Butler	Indianapolis, IN	L 7–33	
October 31	2:30 p.m.	at Western State Normal	Normal Field; Kalamazoo, MI	L 7–42	
November 5		Dayton	Richmond, IN	T 14–14	
November 11		Muskingum	Richmond, IN	L 7–9	
November 24		Franklin (IN)	Richmond, IN	W 7–0	
All times are in Central time
