= 1921 Notre Dame Fighting Irish football team =

American college football season

1921 Notre Dame Fighting Irish football
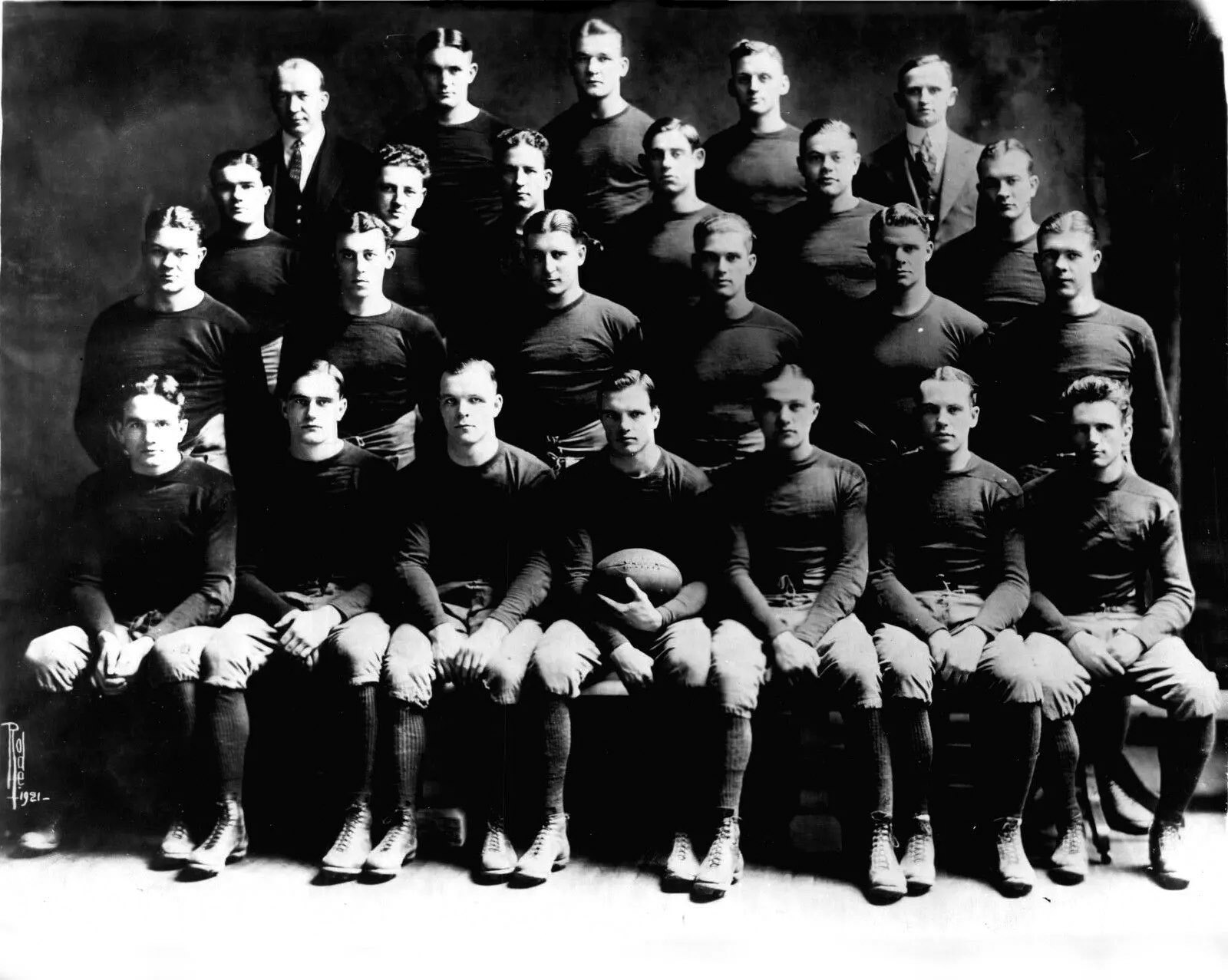
- Conference: Independent
- Record: 10–1
- Head coach: Knute Rockne (4th season)
- Offensive scheme: Single-wing
- Base defense: 7–2–2
- Captain: Eddie Anderson
- Home stadium: Cartier Field

1921 Midwestern college football independents records
	Conf.			Overall
Team	W	L	T	W		L		T
Detroit Junior College		–		6	–	0	–	2
Notre Dame		–		10	–	1	–	0
Creighton		–		8	–	1	–	0
Detroit		–		8	–	1	–	0
South Dakota State		–		7	–	1	–	0
Kirksville Osteopaths		–		6	–	1	–	0
Iowa State Teachers		–		5	–	1	–	1
Wabash		–		7	–	2	–	0
Central Michigan		–		7	–	2	–	1
Butler		–		6	–	2	–	0
Western State Normal		–		6	–	2	–	0
Marquette		–		6	–	2	–	1
DePauw		–		4	–	3	–	0
Haskell		–		5	–	4	–	0
Michigan Mines		–		1	–	1	–	0
North Dakota Agricultural		–		3	–	3	–	1
Saint Louis		–		4	–	4	–	1
Valparaiso		–		2	–	2	–	1
Michigan Agricultural		–		3	–	5	–	0
Northern Illinois State		–		3	–	5	–	0
Earlham		–		2	–	4	–	1
St. Ignatius (OH)		–		2	–	6	–	0
Dayton		–		1	–	7	–	1
Kent State		–		0	–	2	–	1

The 1921 Notre Dame Fighting Irish football team was an American football team that represented the University of Notre Dame as an independent during the 1921 college football season. In their fourth year under head coach Knute Rockne, the Irish compiled a 10–1 record, shut out six opponents, and outscored all opponents by a total of 375 to 41. With victories over Kalamazoo and DePauw to start the season, Notre Dame extended its winning streak to 20 games, dating back to the first game of the 1919 season. The streak ended in the third week with a 10–7 loss to the 1921 national champion, Iowa. The Irish then closed the season with eight consecutive wins, including victories over rivals Purdue, Nebraska, Army, and Michigan Agricultural (now Michigan State).

Right end Eddie Anderson was the team captain and a consensus first-team pick on the 1921 All-America college football team. Four other Notre players received first-team All-America honors from at least one selector: end Roger Kiley; tackle Buck Shaw; guard Hunk Anderson; and back John Mohardt. Mohardt tallied 781 rushing yards, 995 passing yards, 12 rushing touchdowns, and nine passing touchdowns. Grantland Rice wrote that "Mohardt could throw the ball to within a foot or two of any given space" and noted that Notre Dame in 1921 "was the first team we know of to build its attack around a forward passing game, rather than use a forward passing game as a mere aid to the running game."

The team played its home games at Cartier Field in Notre Dame, Indiana.

== Schedule ==
Date	Opponent	Site	Result	Attendance	Source
September 24	Kalamazoo	Cartier Field; Notre Dame, IN	W 56–0	8,000	
October 1	DePauw	Cartier Field; Notre Dame, IN	W 57–10	8,000	
October 8	at Iowa	Iowa Field; Iowa City, IA	L 7–10	7,500	
October 15	at Purdue	Stuart Field; West Lafayette, IN (rivalry)	W 33–0	7,500	
October 22	Nebraska	Cartier Field; Notre Dame, IN (rivalry)	W 7–0	14,000	
October 29	vs. Indiana	Washington Park; Indianapolis, IN	W 28–7	20,000	
November 5	at Army	The Plain; West Point, NY (rivalry)	W 28–0	7,000	
November 8	vs. Rutgers	Polo Grounds; New York, NY	W 48–0	12,000	
November 12	Haskell	Cartier Field; Notre Dame, IN	W 42–7	5,000	
November 19	at Marquette	Milwaukee, WI	W 21–7	11,000–12,000	
November 24	Michigan Agricultural	Cartier Field; Notre Dame, IN (rivalry)	W 48–0	15,000	

== Personnel ==
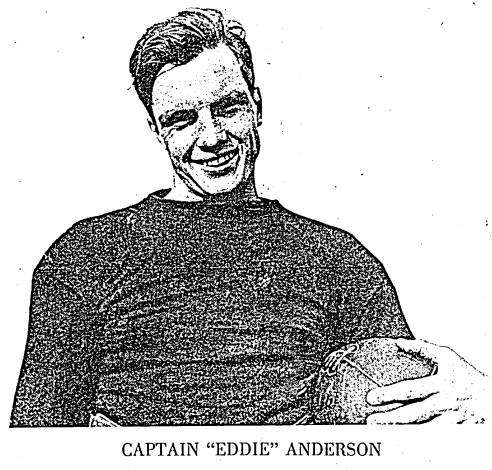
Eddie Anderson, 1921

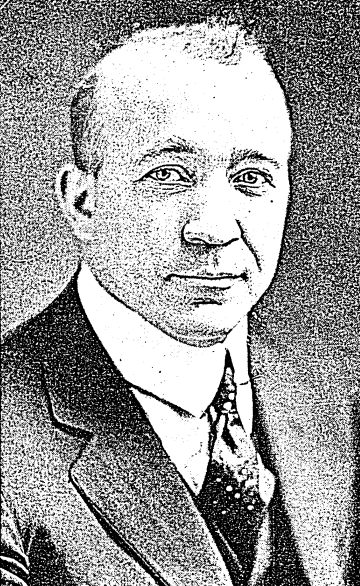
Knute Rockne, 1921

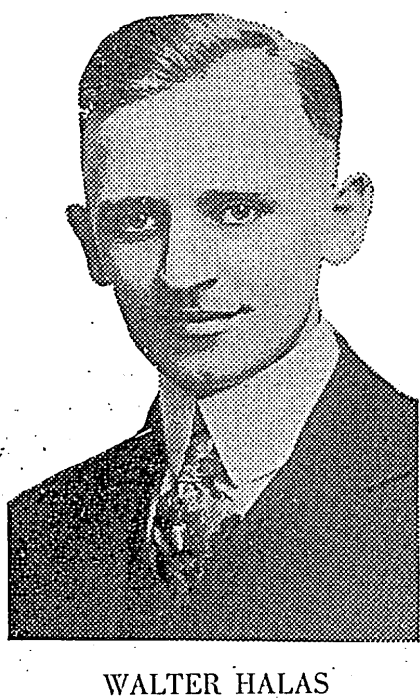
Walter Halas, 1921

=== Players ===
- Eddie Anderson, captain and right end
- Hunk Anderson, left guard
- Harvey Brown
- Glen Carberry
- Paul Castner, right halfback
- Fod Cotton
- Danny Coughlin
- Edward DeGree
- August Desch
- James Dooley, right guard
- Art Garvey, left guard
- Chet Grant, quarterback
- Roger Kiley, left end
- Ojay Larson
- Tom Lieb, tackle
- Harry Mehre, center
- John Mohardt, left halfback
- Bob Phelan
- Buck Shaw, right tackle
- Frank Thomas, quarterback
- Earl Walsh, halfback
- Chet A. Wynne, fullback

=== Coaching staff ===
- Head coach - Knute Rockne
- Assistant coach - Walter Halas
- Freshman coach - Barry Holton
- Assistant freshman coach - Albert Hodler
- Student manager - Gene Kennedy
