= 1921 Michigan Agricultural Aggies football team =

American college football season

1921 Michigan Agricultural Aggies football
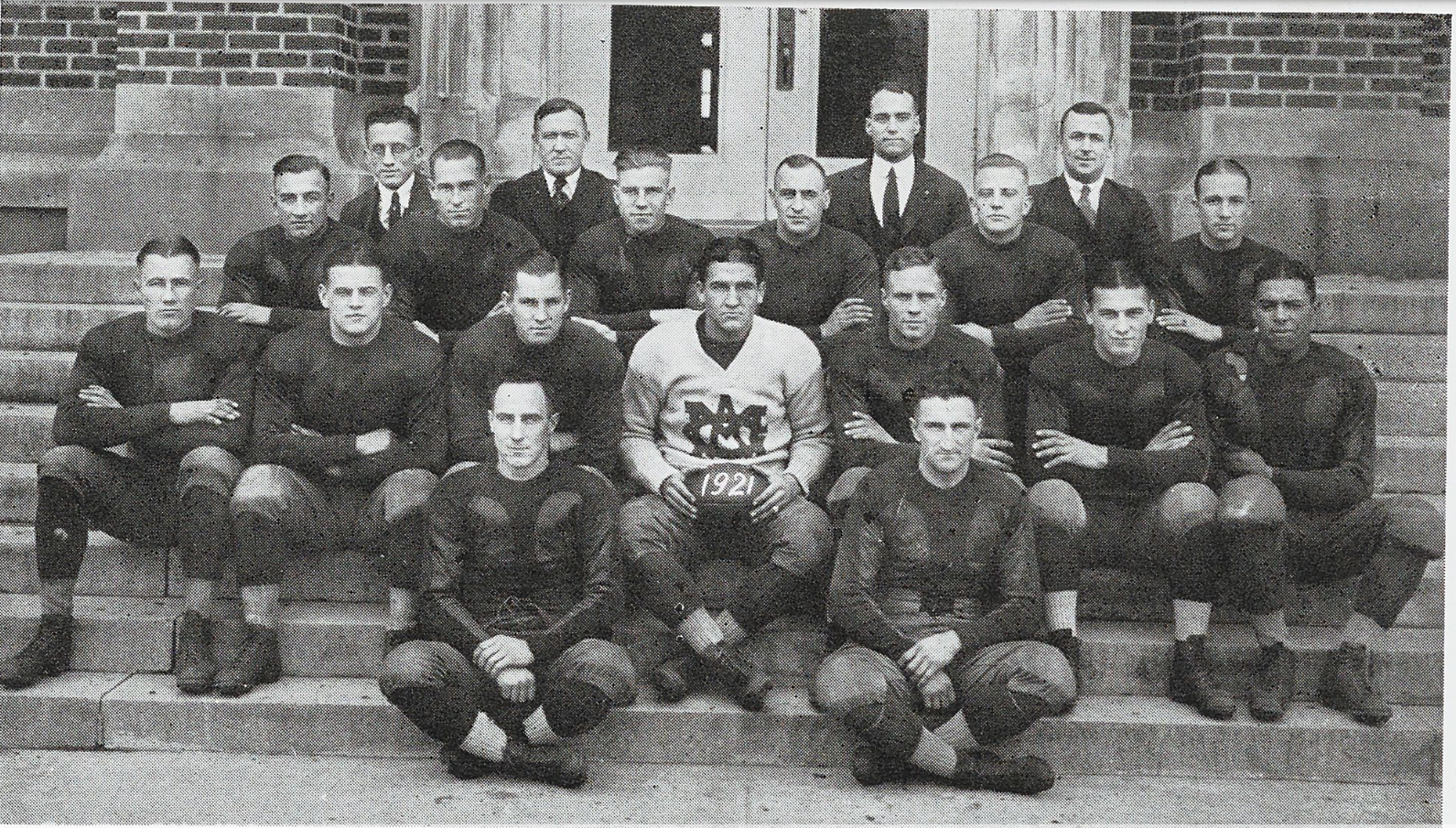
- Conference: Independent
- Record: 3–5
- Head coach: Albert Barron (1st season)
- Captain: John Bos
- Home stadium: College Field

1921 Midwestern college football independents records
	Conf.			Overall
Team	W	L	T	W		L		T
Detroit Junior College		–		6	–	0	–	2
Notre Dame		–		10	–	1	–	0
Creighton		–		8	–	1	–	0
Detroit		–		8	–	1	–	0
South Dakota State		–		7	–	1	–	0
Kirksville Osteopaths		–		6	–	1	–	0
Iowa State Teachers		–		5	–	1	–	1
Wabash		–		7	–	2	–	0
Central Michigan		–		7	–	2	–	1
Butler		–		6	–	2	–	0
Western State Normal		–		6	–	2	–	0
Marquette		–		6	–	2	–	1
DePauw		–		4	–	3	–	0
Haskell		–		5	–	4	–	0
Michigan Mines		–		1	–	1	–	0
North Dakota Agricultural		–		3	–	3	–	1
Saint Louis		–		4	–	4	–	1
Valparaiso		–		2	–	2	–	1
Michigan Agricultural		–		3	–	5	–	0
Northern Illinois State		–		3	–	5	–	0
Earlham		–		2	–	4	–	1
St. Ignatius (OH)		–		2	–	6	–	0
Dayton		–		1	–	7	–	1
Kent State		–		0	–	2	–	1

The 1921 Michigan Agricultural Aggies football team represented Michigan Agricultural College (MAC) as an independent during the 1921 college football season. In their first year under head coach Albert Barron, the Aggies compiled a 3–5 record and were outscored by their opponents 126 to 68.

== Schedule ==
Date	Opponent	Site	Result	Attendance	Source
October 1	Alma	College Field; East Lansing, MI	W 28–0		
October 8	Albion	College Field; East Lansing, MI	L 7–24		
October 15	at Michigan	Ferry Field; Ann Arbor, MI (rivalry)	L 0–30	18,000	
October 22	Western State Normal	College Field; East Lansing, MI	W 17–14		
October 29	at Marquette	Milwaukee, WI	L 0–7		
November 5	South Dakota^{†}	College Field; East Lansing, MI	W 14–0		
November 12	at Butler	Indianapolis, IN	L 2–3		
November 24	at Notre Dame	Cartier Field; South Bend, IN (rivalry)	L 0–48		
^{†}Homecoming

== Game summaries ==
=== Michigan ===
Michigan Agricultural at Michigan

Team	1	2	3	4	Total
Michigan Agricultural	0	0	0	0	0
• Michigan	7	0	14	9	30

- Date: October 15, 1921
- Location: Ferry Field
  Ann Arbor, MI
- Referee: Hackett (Army)

On October 15, 1921, the Aggies lost to Michigan by a 30–0 score. The game was played at Ferry Field before a crowd of 18,000 spectators. Michigan halfback Harry Kipke, who would later coach the Aggies in 1928, scored three touchdowns, including one on a punt return from midfield, and kicked nine punts for an average of better than 42 yards. Michigan's passing games was called "nothing short of miserable" as five of the Wolverines' passes were intercepted and only one was completed. Michigan's defense held the Aggies to 57 yards of total offense and two first downs (one of which was achieved by an offside penalty against Michigan). The game was played in 15-minute quarters at Ferry Field in Ann Arbor.
