= 1921 SMU Mustangs football team =

American college football season

1921 SMU Mustangs football
- Conference: Southwest Conference, Texas Intercollegiate Athletic Association
- Record: 1–6–1 (0–4 SWC, 1–3–1 TIAA)
- Head coach: J. Burton Rix (5th season; first 2 games); Bill Cunningham (interim, final 6 games)
- Captain: Jimmy Kitts
- Home stadium: Armstrong Field, Fair Park Stadium

1921 Southwest Conference football standings
	Conf.					Overall
Team	W		L		T	W		L		T
Texas A&M $	3	–	0	–	2	6	–	1	–	2
Texas	1	–	0	–	1	6	–	1	–	1
Arkansas	2	–	1	–	0	5	–	3	–	1
Baylor	2	–	2	–	0	8	–	3	–	0
Oklahoma A&M	1	–	1	–	0	5	–	4	–	1
Rice	1	–	2	–	1	4	–	4	–	1
SMU	0	–	4	–	0	1	–	6	–	1
$ – Conference champion

1921 Texas Intercollegiate Athletic Association football standings
	Conf.					Overall
Team	W		L		T	W		L		T
Rice $	3	–	0	–	0	4	–	4	–	1
Howard Payne	4	–	1	–	0	5	–	3	–	0
TCU	2	–	1	–	0	6	–	3	–	1
Simmons (TX)	3	–	2	–	0	6	–	4	–	0
Austin	3	–	2	–	0	5	–	4	–	0
Trinity (TX)	2	–	4	–	0	4	–	4	–	0
SMU	1	–	3	–	1	1	–	6	–	1
Daniel Baker	0	–	2	–	0	3	–	4	–	1
Southwestern (TX)	0	–	3	–	1	0	–	6	–	1
$ – Conference champion

The 1921 SMU Mustangs football team was an American football team that represented Southern Methodist University (SMU) as a member of the Southwest Conference (SWC) during the 1921 college football season. Coach J. Burton Rix resigned after the first two games and Bill Cunningham took over as the interim coach for the remainder of the season. The team compiled an overall record of 1–6–1 record with mark of 0–4–1 in conference play, placing last out of seven teams in the SWC. The Mustangs were outscored by a total of 92 to 15. The team played its home games at Armstrong Field in Dallas.

== Schedule ==
Date	Opponent	Site	Result	Attendance	Source
October 6	Howard Payne	Armstrong Field; Dallas, TX	W 3–0		
October 12	Texas A&M	Fair Park Stadium; Dallas, TX	L 0–13	8,000	
October 21	Austin	Armstrong Field; Dallas, TX	L 6–17		
October 29	vs. Arkansas	Andrews Field; Fort Smith, AR	L 0–14	3,000	
November 5	at Rice	Rice Field; Houston, TX (rivalry)	L 0–7		
November 11	TCU	Fair Park Stadium; Dallas, TX (rivalry)	L 6–13		
November 18	Southwestern (TX)	Armstrong Field; Dallas, TX	T 0–0		
November 24	at Baylor	Carroll Field; Waco, TX	L 0–28	5,000	
