= 1921 Baylor Bears football team =

American college football season

1921 Baylor Bears football
- Conference: Southwest Conference
- Record: 8–3 (2–2 SWC)
- Head coach: Frank Bridges (2nd season)
- Captain: Cop Weathers
- Home stadium: Carroll Field

1921 Southwest Conference football standings
	Conf.					Overall
Team	W		L		T	W		L		T
Texas A&M $	3	–	0	–	2	6	–	1	–	2
Texas	1	–	0	–	1	6	–	1	–	1
Arkansas	2	–	1	–	0	5	–	3	–	1
Baylor	2	–	2	–	0	8	–	3	–	0
Oklahoma A&M	1	–	1	–	0	5	–	4	–	1
Rice	1	–	2	–	1	4	–	4	–	1
SMU	0	–	4	–	0	1	–	6	–	1
$ – Conference champion

The 1921 Baylor Bears football team was an American football team that represented Baylor University as a member of the Southwest Conference (SWC) during the 1921 college football season. In its second season under head coach Frank Bridges, the team compiled an 8–3 record (2–2 against SWC opponents) and outscored opponents by a total of 214 to 83.

== Schedule ==
Date	Opponent	Site	Result	Source
September 30	Tarleton Agricultural College*	Carroll Field; Waco, TX	W 35–0	
October 1	at Austin*	Kidd Field; Sherman, TX	W 17–13	
October 8	Rice	Carroll Field; Waco, TX	W 17–14	
October 15	vs. Boston College*	State Fair Grounds; Dallas, TX	L 7–23	
October 22	Phillips*	Cotton Palace; Waco, TX	W 34–6	
October 29	Southwestern (TX)*	Cotton Palace; Waco, TX	W 16–0	
November 5	Texas A&M	Cotton Palace; Waco, TX (rivalry)	L 3–14	
November 11	Simmons (TX)*	Carroll Field; Waco, TX	W 21–0	
November 18	at Arkansas	The Hill; Fayetteville, AR	L 12–13	
November 24	SMU	Carroll Field; Waco, TX	W 28–0	
December 3	vs. Mississippi College*	Gardner Park; Dallas, TX	W 24–0	
*Non-conference game
