= 1921 Saint Louis Billikens football team =

American college football season

1921 Saint Louis Billikens football
- Conference: Independent
- Record: 4–4–1
- Head coach: Stephen G. O'Rourke (1st season)
- Home stadium: St. Louis University Athletic Field, Sportsman's Park

1921 Midwestern college football independents records
	Conf.			Overall
Team	W	L	T	W		L		T
Detroit Junior College		–		6	–	0	–	2
Notre Dame		–		10	–	1	–	0
Creighton		–		8	–	1	–	0
Detroit		–		8	–	1	–	0
South Dakota State		–		7	–	1	–	0
Kirksville Osteopaths		–		6	–	1	–	0
Iowa State Teachers		–		5	–	1	–	1
Wabash		–		7	–	2	–	0
Central Michigan		–		7	–	2	–	1
Butler		–		6	–	2	–	0
Western State Normal		–		6	–	2	–	0
Marquette		–		6	–	2	–	1
DePauw		–		4	–	3	–	0
Haskell		–		5	–	4	–	0
Michigan Mines		–		1	–	1	–	0
North Dakota Agricultural		–		3	–	3	–	1
Saint Louis		–		4	–	4	–	1
Valparaiso		–		2	–	2	–	1
Michigan Agricultural		–		3	–	5	–	0
Northern Illinois State		–		3	–	5	–	0
Earlham		–		2	–	4	–	1
St. Ignatius (OH)		–		2	–	6	–	0
Dayton		–		1	–	7	–	1
Kent State		–		0	–	2	–	1

The 1921 Saint Louis Billikens football team was an American football team that represented Saint Louis University as an independent during the 1921 college football season. In their first season under head coach Stephen G. O'Rourke, the Billikens compiled a 4–4–1 record and was outscored by a total of 148 to 76. The team played its home games at St. Louis University Athletic Field on the school's campus and at Sportsman's Park in St. Louis.

== Schedule ==
Date	Time	Opponent	Site	Result	Attendance	Source
September 24		Cape Girardeau Normal	St. Louis University Athletic Field; St. Louis, MO	W 7–0		
October 1		Kansas City University	St. Louis University Athletic Field; St. Louis, MO	W 12–0		
October 8		Missouri	Sportsman's Park; St. Louis, MO	L 0–32		
October 15		Milwaukee School of Engineering	Sportsman's Park; St. Louis, MO	W 14–13		
October 22		DePauw	Sportsman's Park; St. Louis, MO	L 7–21	5,000	
October 29		Lombard	Sportsman's Park; St. Louis, MO	L 0–61		
November 5		at Creighton	Omaha, NE	L 0–21		
November 11		Westminster (MO)	Sportsman's Park; St. Louis, MO	W 36–0		
November 24	2:00 p.m.	Washington University	Sportsman's Park; St. Louis, MO	T 0–0	14,000	
All times are in Central time
