= 1921 Texas Longhorns football team =

American college football season

1921 Texas Longhorns football
- Conference: Southwest Conference
- Record: 6–1–1 (1–0–1 SWC)
- Head coach: Berry Whitaker (2nd season)
- Captain: Tom Dennis
- Home stadium: Clark Field

1921 Southwest Conference football standings
| | Conf. | | | | | Overall |
| Team | W | | L | | T | W | | L | | T |
|---|---|---|---|---|---|---|---|---|---|---|
| Texas A&M $ | 3 | – | 0 | – | 2 | 6 | – | 1 | – | 2 |
| Texas | 1 | – | 0 | – | 1 | 6 | – | 1 | – | 1 |
| Arkansas | 2 | – | 1 | – | 0 | 5 | – | 3 | – | 1 |
| Baylor | 2 | – | 2 | – | 0 | 8 | – | 3 | – | 0 |
| Oklahoma A&M | 1 | – | 1 | – | 0 | 5 | – | 4 | – | 1 |
| Rice | 1 | – | 2 | – | 1 | 4 | – | 4 | – | 1 |
| SMU | 0 | – | 4 | – | 0 | 1 | – | 6 | – | 1 |
$ – Conference champion

The 1921 Texas Longhorns football team represented the University of Texas at Austin in the 1921 college football season. In their second year under head coach Berry Whitaker, the Longhorns compiled a 6–1–1 record, shut out six of eight opponents (including a scoreless tie with Texas A&M), and outscored all opponents by a collective total of 268 to 27. Before the upset by Vanderbilt, the 1921 squad was thought perhaps the best in Longhorns history.

== Schedule ==
| Date | Opponent | Site | Result | Attendance | Source |
|---|---|---|---|---|---|
| October 1 | St. Edwards* | Clark Field; Austin, TX | W 33–0 | | |
| October 7 | Austin* | Clark Field; Austin, TX | W 60–0 | | |
| October 15 | Howard Payne* | Clark Field; Austin, TX | W 21–0 | | |
| October 22 | vs. Vanderbilt* | Fair Park; Dallas, TX | L 0–20 | 15,000 | |
| October 29 | Rice | Clark Field; Austin, TX (rivalry) | W 56–0 | | |
| November 5 | Southwestern (TX)* | Clark Field; Austin, TX | W 44–0 | | |
| November 11 | Mississippi A&M* | Clark Field; Austin, TX | W 54–7 | | |
| November 24 | at Texas A&M | Kyle Field; College Station, TX (rivalry) | T 0–0 | | |
*Non-conference game
