= 1921 Kalamazoo Baptists football team =

American college football season

1921 Kalamazoo Baptists football

MIAA champion
- Conference: Michigan Intercollegiate Athletic Association
- Record: 7–2 (3–0 MIAA)
- Head coach: Ralph H. Young (5th season)

1921 Michigan Intercollegiate Athletic Association football standings
| | Conf. | | | | | Overall |
| Team | W | | L | | T | W | | L | | T |
|---|---|---|---|---|---|---|---|---|---|---|
| Kalamazoo $ | 3 | – | 0 | – | 0 | 7 | – | 2 | – | 0 |
| Albion | 4 | – | 1 | – | 0 | 6 | – | 2 | – | 0 |
| Hillsdale | 2 | – | 2 | – | 0 | 5 | – | 3 | – | 0 |
| Michigan State Normal | 1 | – | 2 | – | 0 | 3 | – | 3 | – | 0 |
| Olivet | 1 | – | 3 | – | 0 | 2 | – | 5 | – | 1 |
| Alma | 1 | – | 4 | – | 0 | 2 | – | 6 | – | 1 |
$ – Conference champion

The 1921 Kalamazoo Baptists football team represented Kalamazoo College during the 1921 college football season. In Ralph H. Young's fifth year as head coach, Kalamazoo compiled a 7–2 record, and outscored their opponents 234 to 104.

== Schedule ==
| Date | Opponent | Site | Result | Attendance | Source |
|---|---|---|---|---|---|
| September 24 | at Notre Dame* | Cartier Field; Notre Dame, IN | L 0–56 | 8,000 | |
| October 1 | at Indiana* | Jordan Field; Bloomington, IN | L 0–29 | | |
| October 8 | Ferris State* | Kalamazoo, MI | W 97–6 | | |
| October 15 | at Olivet | Olivet, MI | W 34–0 | | |
| October 22 | North-Western College* | Kalamazoo, MI | W 21–6 | | |
| October 28 | Franklin (IN)* | Kalamazoo, MI | W 48–7 | | |
| November 5 | Albion | Kalamazoo, MI | W 7–0 | | |
| November 11 | at Valparaiso* | Valparaiso, IN | W 12–0 | | |
| November 19 | at Alma | Alma, MI | W 15–0 | | |
*Non-conference game
