= 1921 Arkansas Razorbacks football team =

American college football season

1921 Arkansas Razorbacks football
- Conference: Southwest Conference
- Record: 5–3–1 (2–1 SWC)
- Head coach: George McLaren (2nd season)
- Captain: Ben Winkelman
- Home stadium: The Hill

1921 Southwest Conference football standings
	Conf.					Overall
Team	W		L		T	W		L		T
Texas A&M $	3	–	0	–	2	6	–	1	–	2
Texas	1	–	0	–	1	6	–	1	–	1
Arkansas	2	–	1	–	0	5	–	3	–	1
Baylor	2	–	2	–	0	8	–	3	–	0
Oklahoma A&M	1	–	1	–	0	5	–	4	–	1
Rice	1	–	2	–	1	4	–	4	–	1
SMU	0	–	4	–	0	1	–	6	–	1
$ – Conference champion

The 1921 Arkansas Razorbacks football team represented the University of Arkansas in the Southwest Conference (SWC) during the 1921 college football season. In their second and final year under head coach George McLaren, the Razorbacks compiled a 5–3–1 record (2–1 against SWC opponents), finished in third place in the SWC, and outscored their opponents by a combined total of 144 to 48.

== Schedule ==
Date	Time	Opponent	Site	Result	Attendance	Source
October 1		Hendrix*	The Hill; Fayetteville, AR	W 28–0		
October 8		Drury*	The Hill; Fayetteville, AR	W 40–0		
October 15		Ouachita*	Kavanaugh Field; Little Rock, AR	W 28–0		
October 22		Oklahoma A&M	The Hill; Fayetteville, AR	L 0–7		
October 29		vs. SMU	Andrews Field; Fort Smith, AR	W 14–0	3,000	
November 5		vs. LSU*	Fair Grounds; Shreveport, LA (rivalry)	L 7–10		
November 12		Phillips*	The Hill; Fayetteville, AR	T 0–0		
November 18		Baylor	The Hill; Fayetteville, AR	W 13–12		
November 24	2:30 p.m.	at TCU*	Panther Park; Fort Worth, TX	L 14–19		
*Non-conference game; All times are in Central time
