= 1921 Creighton Blue and White football team =

American college football season

1921 Creighton Blue and White football
- Conference: Independent
- Record: 8–1
- Head coach: Howard M. Baldrige (1st season)

1921 Midwestern college football independents records
| | Conf. | | | Overall |
| Team | W | L | T | W | | L | | T |
|---|---|---|---|---|---|---|---|---|
| Detroit Junior College | | – | | 6 | – | 0 | – | 2 |
| Notre Dame | | – | | 10 | – | 1 | – | 0 |
| Creighton | | – | | 8 | – | 1 | – | 0 |
| Detroit | | – | | 8 | – | 1 | – | 0 |
| South Dakota State | | – | | 7 | – | 1 | – | 0 |
| Kirksville Osteopaths | | – | | 6 | – | 1 | – | 0 |
| Iowa State Teachers | | – | | 5 | – | 1 | – | 1 |
| Wabash | | – | | 7 | – | 2 | – | 0 |
| Central Michigan | | – | | 7 | – | 2 | – | 1 |
| Butler | | – | | 6 | – | 2 | – | 0 |
| Western State Normal | | – | | 6 | – | 2 | – | 0 |
| Marquette | | – | | 6 | – | 2 | – | 1 |
| DePauw | | – | | 4 | – | 3 | – | 0 |
| Haskell | | – | | 5 | – | 4 | – | 0 |
| Michigan Mines | | – | | 1 | – | 1 | – | 0 |
| North Dakota Agricultural | | – | | 3 | – | 3 | – | 1 |
| Saint Louis | | – | | 4 | – | 4 | – | 1 |
| Valparaiso | | – | | 2 | – | 2 | – | 1 |
| Michigan Agricultural | | – | | 3 | – | 5 | – | 0 |
| Northern Illinois State | | – | | 3 | – | 5 | – | 0 |
| Earlham | | – | | 2 | – | 4 | – | 1 |
| St. Ignatius (OH) | | – | | 2 | – | 6 | – | 0 |
| Dayton | | – | | 1 | – | 7 | – | 1 |
| Kent State | | – | | 0 | – | 2 | – | 1 |

The 1921 Creighton Blue and White football team was an American football team that represented Creighton University as an independent during the 1921 college football season. In its first season under head coach Howard M. Baldrige, the team compiled an 8–1 record and outscored opponents by a total of 146 to 34. The team played its home games in Omaha, Nebraska.

== Schedule ==
| Date | Opponent | Site | Result | Attendance | Source |
|---|---|---|---|---|---|
| October 1 | Dakota Wesleyan | Creighton Field; Omaha, NE | W 21–0 | | |
| October 8 | at Des Moines | Des Moines, IA | W 28–0 | | |
| October 15 | Kansas State | Creighton Field; Omaha, NE | W 14–7 | 6,000 | |
| October 22 | Marquette | Creighton Field; Omaha, NE | W 3–0 | 7,000 | |
| October 29 | at St. Xavier | Corcoran Field; Cincinnati, OH | W 14–7 | | |
| November 5 | Saint Louis | Omaha, NE | W 21–0 | | |
| November 12 | Oklahoma A&M | Omaha, NE | W 26–13 | 2,000 | |
| November 19 | South Dakota State | Omaha, NE | L 0–7 | | |
| November 24 | South Dakota | Omaha, NE | W 19–0 | | |
