= 1921 North Dakota Agricultural Aggies football team =

American college football season

1921 North Dakota Agricultural Aggies football
- Conference: Independent
- Record: 3–3–1
- Head coach: Stanley Borleske (3rd season)
- Captain: M. Ravine Latimer
- Home stadium: Dacotah Field

1921 Midwestern college football independents records
	Conf.			Overall
Team	W	L	T	W		L		T
Detroit Junior College		–		6	–	0	–	2
Notre Dame		–		10	–	1	–	0
Creighton		–		8	–	1	–	0
Detroit		–		8	–	1	–	0
South Dakota State		–		7	–	1	–	0
Kirksville Osteopaths		–		6	–	1	–	0
Iowa State Teachers		–		5	–	1	–	1
Wabash		–		7	–	2	–	0
Central Michigan		–		7	–	2	–	1
Butler		–		6	–	2	–	0
Western State Normal		–		6	–	2	–	0
Marquette		–		6	–	2	–	1
DePauw		–		4	–	3	–	0
Haskell		–		5	–	4	–	0
Michigan Mines		–		1	–	1	–	0
North Dakota Agricultural		–		3	–	3	–	1
Saint Louis		–		4	–	4	–	1
Valparaiso		–		2	–	2	–	1
Michigan Agricultural		–		3	–	5	–	0
Northern Illinois State		–		3	–	5	–	0
Earlham		–		2	–	4	–	1
St. Ignatius (OH)		–		2	–	6	–	0
Dayton		–		1	–	7	–	1
Kent State		–		0	–	2	–	1

The 1921 North Dakota Agricultural Aggies football team was an American football team that represented North Dakota Agricultural College (now known as North Dakota State University) as an independent during the 1921 college football season. In their third year under head coach Stanley Borleske, the team compiled a 3–3–1 record.

== Schedule ==
Date	Opponent	Site	Result	Source
October 1	at Jamestown	Jamestown, ND	T 0–0	
October 8	Northern Normal	Dacotah Field; Fargo, ND	W 7–0	
October 15	Moorhead State	Fargo, ND	W 34–0	
October 22	South Dakota State	Dacotah Field; Fargo, ND (rivalry)	L 0–54	
October 29	at North Dakota	Dakota Field; Grand Forks, ND (rivalry)	L 3–38	
November 5	Fargo	Dacotah Field; Fargo, ND	W 19–7	
November 18	at Montana	Dornblaser Field; Missoula, MT	L 6–7	
