= 1921 Kansas State Wildcats football team =

American college football season

1921 Kansas State Wildcats football
- Conference: Missouri Valley Conference
- Record: 5–3 (4–2 MVC)
- Head coach: Charlie Bachman (2nd season)
- Offensive scheme: Notre Dame Box
- Home stadium: Ahearn Field

1921 Missouri Valley Conference football standings
	Conf.					Overall
Team	W		L		T	W		L		T
Nebraska $	3	–	0	–	0	7	–	1	–	0
Kansas State	4	–	2	–	0	5	–	3	–	0
Missouri	4	–	2	–	0	6	–	2	–	0
Drake	2	–	2	–	0	5	–	2	–	0
Kansas	3	–	3	–	0	4	–	4	–	0
Iowa State	3	–	4	–	0	4	–	4	–	0
Oklahoma	2	–	3	–	0	5	–	3	–	0
Washington University	2	–	3	–	0	4	–	3	–	1
Grinnell	0	–	4	–	0	2	–	5	–	0
$ – Conference champion

The 1921 Kansas State Wildcats football team represented Kansas State Agricultural College in the 1921 college football season.

== Schedule ==
Date	Time	Opponent	Site	Result	Attendance	Source
October 1		College of Emporia*	Ahearn Field; Manhattan, KS	W 7–3		
October 8	2:30 p.m.	Washington University	Ahearn Field; Manhattan, KS	W 21–0		
October 15		at Creighton*	Omaha, NE	L 7–14	6,000	
October 22		Missouri	Ahearn Field; Manhattan, KS	W 7–5		
October 29		at Kansas	Memorial Stadium; Lawrence, KS (rivalry)	L 7–21		
November 5		Grinnell	Ahearn Field; Manhattan, KS	W 21–7		
November 11		at Iowa State	State Field; Ames, IA (rivalry)	L 0–7		
November 19		Oklahoma^{†}	Ahearn Field; Manhattan, KS	W 14–7		
*Non-conference game; ^{†}Homecoming; All times are in Central time
