= Cop Weathers =

American football player (born 1998)

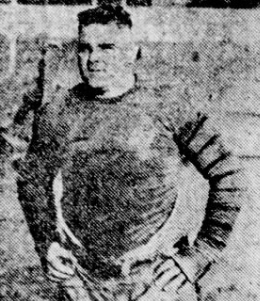
- Weathers, circa 1922

No. 17
- Position: Guard

Personal information
- Born: June 9, 1898; Gatesville, Texas, U.S.
- Died: September 27, 1964 (aged 66); Marlin, Texas, U.S.
- Listed height: 5 ft 9 in (1.75 m)
- Listed weight: 230 lb (104 kg)

Career information
- High school: Waco (Waco, Texas)
- College: Baylor (1919–1922)

Career history
- Buffalo Rangers (1926)

Awards and highlights
- 2× First-team All-Southwest (1921–1922)
- Stats at Pro Football Reference

Guy Barton "Cop" Weathers (June 9, 1898 – September 27, 1964), middle name sometimes reported as Burton, was an American football player and coach. He played at the guard position for the Baylor Bears from 1919 to 1922 and also played four years of college baseball at Baylor. He also briefly played professional football in 1926 for the Buffalo Rangers of the National Football League (NFL). Weathers was also a football and baseball coach at Baylor in the mid-1920s and a high school football coach and teacher for many years.

== Early life ==
Guy Barton Weathers was born on June 9, 1898, in Gatesville, Texas. He played four years of high school football at Waco High School in Waco, Texas. Weathers was described as a ""hard player, with bull dog grit," a "deadly tackler", "surprisingly fast", and "without a doubt the best tackler" Waco High School ever had.

Weathers then spent a year in France while serving in the U.S. military during World War I. Weathers played on a service football team while in the military.

== College career ==
Weathers played college football for the Bears of Baylor University from 1919 to 1922. Contemporary sources show that he played on the varsity team during the 1919 season and received a varsity letter. However, the Baylor media guide only credits Weathers with three letters (1920–1922). On September 28, 1921, two days before the start of the 1921 season, Weathers was named the team captain for the 1921 season due to captain-elect Jerome Reid having left Baylor. He won a reputation as "a star on defense", "a tower of strength in the Baylor line", and "a splendid place-kicker." Weathers also played on the 1922 Baylor team that won the Southwestern Conference championship. He received first-team All-Southwest Conference honors in both 1921 and 1922.

Weathers also played for the Baylor baseball team for four years. In January 1923, Weathers was appointed as coach of Baylor's freshman football team and as head coach of the school's baseball team. His 1923 Baylor freshman squad was called "the greatest Cub team Baylor has ever had."

== Professional career ==
In 1926, Jim Kendrick announced his "Buffalo Rangers" experiment, fielding an exhibition team of players from Texas and the Southwestern United States for the 1926 season. His plan was that this exhibition squad would then represent Buffalo in the National Football League (NFL). Because most of the players were Texans, the team was nicknamed the "Rangers" in reference to the state's legendary peacekeeping force. In September 1926, Weather was one of 14 players who traveled 1,300 miles from Texas to Buffalo, New York in five Fords. Weathers played in four or five games, starting two, as a guard for the Rangers during the 1926 season.

== Personal life ==
Weathers graduated from East Texas State Teachers College with a master's degree. Afterwards, he was a teacher and football coach at Texas Military College. Weathers was a high school football coach and teacher in Texas for decades. He also spent some time as a firemen in Waco and played baseball for the Waco Firemen. Weathers taught and coached at Terrell High School, Marlin High School, Connally High School, and Ennis High School. He retired from Ennis High in June 1963.

Weathers was married to Julia Miriam (Jones) Weathers. They had a son, Guy Marvin Weathers. His wife died suddenly in 1951 at age 52.

Weathers was a Baptist and a Freemason. He died on September 27, 1964, at age 66 at the VA hospital in Marlin, Texas.
