= 1921 Kent State Silver Foxes football team =

American college football season

1921 Kent State Silver Foxes football
- Conference: Independent
- Record: 0–2–1
- Head coach: Paul G. Chandler (2nd season)
- Captain: Claude Ryan
- Home stadium: Rockwell Field

1921 Midwestern college football independents records
	Conf.			Overall
Team	W	L	T	W		L		T
Detroit Junior College		–		6	–	0	–	2
Notre Dame		–		10	–	1	–	0
Creighton		–		8	–	1	–	0
Detroit		–		8	–	1	–	0
South Dakota State		–		7	–	1	–	0
Kirksville Osteopaths		–		6	–	1	–	0
Iowa State Teachers		–		5	–	1	–	1
Wabash		–		7	–	2	–	0
Central Michigan		–		7	–	2	–	1
Butler		–		6	–	2	–	0
Western State Normal		–		6	–	2	–	0
Marquette		–		6	–	2	–	1
DePauw		–		4	–	3	–	0
Haskell		–		5	–	4	–	0
Michigan Mines		–		1	–	1	–	0
North Dakota Agricultural		–		3	–	3	–	1
Saint Louis		–		4	–	4	–	1
Valparaiso		–		2	–	2	–	1
Michigan Agricultural		–		3	–	5	–	0
Northern Illinois State		–		3	–	5	–	0
Earlham		–		2	–	4	–	1
St. Ignatius (OH)		–		2	–	6	–	0
Dayton		–		1	–	7	–	1
Kent State		–		0	–	2	–	1

The 1921 Kent State Silver Foxes football team represented Kent State during the 1921 college football season. In its second season of intercollegiate football, the team compiled a 0–2–1 record and was outscored by a total of 20 to 0. Paul G. Chandler was again the head coach.

The Chestnut Burr of 1922 had only a paragraph dedicated to the football team, including the following: "Our football field saw a season of hard use when the fourteen sturdy Kent warriors tackled and charged each other in its tawny dust making the team of 1921. We went against everybody that would play us and because of our showing the best teams in the conference will play us next year. . . . With the increased number of men in school, our veteran players back, and a good number of high school graduates turned this way, we will keep up the good fight of 1920 and '21."

== Schedule ==
Date	Opponent	Site	Result	Source
October 1	Bowling Green	Rockwell Field; Kent, OH (rivalry)	T 0–0	
	John Carroll		L 0–13	
October 29	Ashland		L 0–7	

== Roster ==
The following players received letters for their participation on the team: Claude Ryan, Captain; Louis Carnahan, Manager; Richard Renouf; G. A. Damann; L. D. Hibbard; Johnny Schwartz; Russell Hausman; Paul Spangler; Ralph Rogers; Howard Shepherd; J. J. Deetz; Oliver Wolcott; George Pordney; David Beckwith; Harold Pinach; and Howard Evans.
