= 1921 Western State Normal Hilltoppers football team =

American college football season

1921 Western State Normal Hilltoppers football
- Conference: Independent
- Record: 6–2
- Head coach: William H. Spaulding (15th season)
- Captain: Reed Waterman
- Home stadium: Normal Field

1921 Midwestern college football independents records
	Conf.			Overall
Team	W	L	T	W		L		T
Detroit Junior College		–		6	–	0	–	2
Notre Dame		–		10	–	1	–	0
Creighton		–		8	–	1	–	0
Detroit		–		8	–	1	–	0
South Dakota State		–		7	–	1	–	0
Kirksville Osteopaths		–		6	–	1	–	0
Iowa State Teachers		–		5	–	1	–	1
Wabash		–		7	–	2	–	0
Central Michigan		–		7	–	2	–	1
Butler		–		6	–	2	–	0
Western State Normal		–		6	–	2	–	0
Marquette		–		6	–	2	–	1
DePauw		–		4	–	3	–	0
Haskell		–		5	–	4	–	0
Michigan Mines		–		1	–	1	–	0
North Dakota Agricultural		–		3	–	3	–	1
Saint Louis		–		4	–	4	–	1
Valparaiso		–		2	–	2	–	1
Michigan Agricultural		–		3	–	5	–	0
Northern Illinois State		–		3	–	5	–	0
Earlham		–		2	–	4	–	1
St. Ignatius (OH)		–		2	–	6	–	0
Dayton		–		1	–	7	–	1
Kent State		–		0	–	2	–	1

The 1921 Western State Normal Hilltoppers football team represented Western State Normal School (later renamed Western Michigan University) as an independent during the 1921 college football season. In their 15th and final season under head coach William H. Spaulding, the Hilltoppers compiled a 6–2 record and outscored their opponents, 262 to 40. Tackle Reed Waterman was the team captain.

== Schedule ==
Date	Time	Opponent	Site	Result	Source
September 24	3:30 p.m.	Ferris Institute	Normal Field; Kalamazoo, MI	W 49–0	
October 1		at Albion	Winter-Lau Field; Albion, MI	W 20–9	
October 8	2:00 p.m.	Notre Dame freshmen	Normal Field; Kalamazoo, MI	W 7–0	
October 15	2:15 p.m.	Chicago YMCA College	Normal Field; Kalamazoo, MI	L 3–7	
October 22		at Michigan Agricultural	College Field; East Lansing, MI	L 14–17	
October 31	2:30 p.m.	Earlham	Normal Field; Kalamazoo, MI	W 42–7	
November 4	2:30 p.m.	Hope	Normal Field; Kalamazoo, MI	W 65–0	
November 11	2:15 p.m.	Milwaukee Engineering College	Normal Field; Kalamazoo, MI	W 62–0	
All times are in Central time
