= 1921 Drake Bulldogs football team =

American college football season

1921 Drake Bulldogs football
- Conference: Missouri Valley Conference
- Record: 5–2 (2–2 MVC)
- Head coach: Ossie Solem (1st season)
- Home stadium: Drake Stadium

1921 Missouri Valley Conference football standings
	Conf.					Overall
Team	W		L		T	W		L		T
Nebraska $	3	–	0	–	0	7	–	1	–	0
Kansas State	4	–	2	–	0	5	–	3	–	0
Missouri	4	–	2	–	0	6	–	2	–	0
Drake	2	–	2	–	0	5	–	2	–	0
Kansas	3	–	3	–	0	4	–	4	–	0
Iowa State	3	–	4	–	0	4	–	4	–	0
Oklahoma	2	–	3	–	0	5	–	3	–	0
Washington University	2	–	3	–	0	4	–	3	–	1
Grinnell	0	–	4	–	0	2	–	5	–	0
$ – Conference champion

The 1921 Drake Bulldogs football team was an American football team that represented Drake University as a member of the Missouri Valley Conference (MVC) during the 1921 college football season. In its first season under head coach Ossie Solem, the team compiled a 5–2 record (2–2 against MVC opponents), finished fourth in the conference, and outscored opponents by a total of 149 to 40.

== Schedule ==
Date	Opponent	Site	Result	Source
October 7	at Penn (IA)*	Oskaloosa, IA	W 42–0	
October 15	at Kansas	Haskell Field; Lawrence, KS	W 15–7	
October 22	Cornell (IA)*	Drake Stadium; Des Moines, IA	W 41–0	
October 29	at Missouri	Rollins Field; Columbia, MO	L 0–6	
November 5	Iowa State^{†}	Drake Stadium; Des Moines, IA	L 0–7	
November 12	Morningside*	Drake Stadium; Des Moines, IA	W 30–10	
November 24	Grinnell	Drake Stadium; Des Moines, IA	W 21–10	
*Non-conference game; ^{†}Homecoming
