= J. Burton Rix =

American athlete and coach (1882–1964)

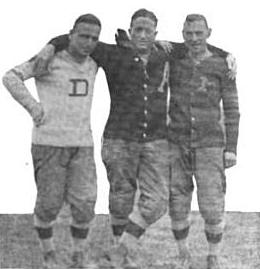
- Rix (left) with assistant coach Lt. Joseph Wier and head coach Dave Allerdice at the University of Texas at Austin, c. 1913

Biographical details
- Born: March 24, 1882; Cincinnati, Ohio, U.S.
- Died: August 8, 1964 (aged 82); Dallas, Texas, U.S.

Playing career

Football
- 1905: Dartmouth

Basketball
- 1903–1905: Dartmouth
- Position: Halfback (football)

Coaching career (HC unless noted)

Football
- 1909–1910: Austin
- 1911–1913: Texas (assistant)
- 1914–1916: Southwestern (TX)
- 1917–1921: SMU
- 1929: Miami (FL)

Basketball
- 1911–1912: Texas
- 1914–1916: Southwestern (TX)
- 1917–1921: SMU

Track & Field
- 1911: Texas

Administrative career (AD unless noted)
- 1914–1917: Southwestern (TX)
- 1917–1921: SMU

Head coaching record
- Overall: 39–34–11; 29–37 (basketball, excluding Southwestern)

John Burton Rix (March 24, 1882 – August 8, 1964) was an American football and basketball player and coach. He served as the head football coach at Austin College (1909–1910), Southwestern University (1914–1916), Southern Methodist University (1917–1921), the University of Miami (1929), compiling a career college football head coaching record of 39–34–11. Rix was also the head basketball coach at the University of Texas at Austin (1911–1912) and at Southern Methodist (1917–1921), tallying a career college basketball coaching mark of 29–37.

== Early life and education ==
Rix was born on March 24, 1882, in Cincinnati.

He attended Dartmouth College, where he played on the football team as a halfback in 1905. He served as the basketball team captain for the 1903–04 and 1904–05 seasons.

Rix graduated from Dartmouth with an A.B. degree in 1906. He was a member of Pi chapter of the Delta Kappa Epsilon fraternity and the Casque and Gauntlet.

In 1910, he was also an English instructor at Austin College.

== Coaching career ==
=== University of Texas ===
In 1912, Rix became the head basketball coach at Texas, replacing W. E. Metzenthin, who had moved into the position of athletic director. Rix served in that capacity for one season and without pay. According to the student yearbook, the Cactus, he "took hold of the squad when it found itself without a leader and quickly demonstrated his ability to transform it into a quintet that was as good as any in the state."

At Texas, he also served as an assistant football coach under Dave Allerdice, from 1911 through 1913.

After a 30–7 loss to Notre Dame in 1913, Rix wrote in The Alcalde, "I was asked to criticize the playing of our team in this game. Had we won I should perhaps have been willing to do so. As it is, there is no necessity for it, for our men themselves, you may be assured, are criticizing themselves with a self-analysis, and sincerity and effectiveness that will do more for the development of football in Texas than a whole season of ordinary games."

=== Southwestern University ===
From 1914 to 1916, he coached the football team and served as the athletic director at Southwestern University in Georgetown, Texas.

=== Southern Methodist ===
In February 1917, he accepted the position as athletic director at Southern Methodist University in Dallas. At SMU, he served as the head basketball and football coach from 1917 to 1921. In 1921 he resigned as football coach after two games and was replaced by Bill Cunningham, also of Dartmouth, during a 1–6–1 campaign in 1921.

=== University of Miami ===
In 1929, Rix became the second head football coach at the University of Miami after a group of local businessmen financially backed the school. Rix left after one season, however, when the Wall Street Crash of 1929 led to an end to the program's off-campus financing.

== Death ==
On August 8, 1964, at age 82, Rix committed suicide by hanging.

== Head coaching record ==
=== Football ===
Year	Team	Overall	Conference	Standing
Austin Kangaroos (Texas Intercollegiate Athletic Association) (1909–1910)
1909	Austin	5–3–2		
1910	Austin	4–3–2		
Austin:		9–6–4		
Southwestern Pirates (Texas Intercollegiate Athletic Association) (1914)
1914	Southwestern	4–4		
Southwestern Pirates (Southwestern Conference / Texas Intercollegiate Athletic Association) (1915–1916)
1915	Southwestern	4–3	0–2 /	7th /
1916	Southwestern	3–5–1	0–4 /	8th /
Southwestern:		11–12–1		
SMU Mustangs (Texas Intercollegiate Athletic Association) (1917)
1917	SMU	3–2–3		
SMU Mustangs (Southwest Conference) (1918–1921)
1918	SMU	4–2	1–2	5th
1919	SMU	5–4–1	0–2–1	6th
1920	SMU	3–5–2	0–4–1	6th
1921	SMU	1–1 (Note: Rix served as SMU's head coach for the first two games of the season before resigning. Bill Cunningham led the team as interim head coach for the final six games. The Mustangs compiled an overall record of 1–6–1 with marks of 0–4 in Southwest Conference play and 1–3–1 against Texas Intercollegiate Athletic Association opponents, placing seventh in both conferences.)	0–1	
SMU:		16–14–6		
Miami Hurricanes (Southern Intercollegiate Athletic Association) (1929)
1929	Miami	3–2	3–2	T–13th
Miami:		3–2	3–2	
Total:		39–34-11		

=== Basketball ===
Record table
Season	Team	Overall	Conference	Standing	Postseason
Texas Longhorns (Independent) (1911–1912)
1911–12	Texas	5–1			
Texas:		5–1 (.833)			
Total:					
