= 1921 Oklahoma A&M Aggies football team =

American college football season

1921 Oklahoma A&M Aggies football
- Conference: Southwest Conference
- Record: 5–4–1 (1–1 SWC)
- Head coach: John Maulbetsch (1st season)
- Home stadium: Lewis Field

1921 Southwest Conference football standings
	Conf.					Overall
Team	W		L		T	W		L		T
Texas A&M $	3	–	0	–	2	6	–	1	–	2
Texas	1	–	0	–	1	6	–	1	–	1
Arkansas	2	–	1	–	0	5	–	3	–	1
Baylor	2	–	2	–	0	8	–	3	–	0
Oklahoma A&M	1	–	1	–	0	5	–	4	–	1
Rice	1	–	2	–	1	4	–	4	–	1
SMU	0	–	4	–	0	1	–	6	–	1
$ – Conference champion

The 1921 Oklahoma A&M Aggies football team represented Oklahoma A&M College in the 1921 college football season. This was the 20th year of football at A&M and the first under John Maulbetsch. The Aggies played their home games at Lewis Field in Stillwater, Oklahoma. They finished the season 5–4–1, 1–1 in the Southwest Conference.

== Schedule ==
Date	Opponent	Site	Result	Attendance	Source
September 24	Southwestern State (OK)*	Lewis Field; Stillwater, OK	W 53–0		
October 1	at Missouri*	Rollins Field; Columbia, MO	L 0–36		
October 8	TCU*	Lewis Field; Stillwater, OK	W 28–21	3,000	
October 15	at Oklahoma*	Boyd Field; Norman, OK (Bedlam)	L 0–6		
October 22	Arkansas	Lewis Field; Stillwater, OK	W 7–0		
October 28	at Texas A&M	Kyle Field; College Station, TX	L 7–23		
November 5	College of Emporia*	Lewis Field; Stillwater, OK	T 7–7		
November 12	at Creighton*	Creighton Field; Omaha, NE	L 13–26	2,000	
November 18	at Phillips*	Alton Field; Enid, OK	W 7–6		
November 24	Washburn*^{†}	Lewis Field; Stillwater, OK	W 13–0		
*Non-conference game; ^{†}Homecoming
