= 1921 Central Michigan Normalites football team =

American college football season

1921 Central Michigan Normalites football
- Conference: Independent
- Record: 7–2–1
- Head coach: Wallace Parker (1st season)

1921 Midwestern college football independents records
	Conf.			Overall
Team	W	L	T	W		L		T
Detroit Junior College		–		6	–	0	–	2
Notre Dame		–		10	–	1	–	0
Creighton		–		8	–	1	–	0
Detroit		–		8	–	1	–	0
South Dakota State		–		7	–	1	–	0
Kirksville Osteopaths		–		6	–	1	–	0
Iowa State Teachers		–		5	–	1	–	1
Wabash		–		7	–	2	–	0
Central Michigan		–		7	–	2	–	1
Butler		–		6	–	2	–	0
Western State Normal		–		6	–	2	–	0
Marquette		–		6	–	2	–	1
DePauw		–		4	–	3	–	0
Haskell		–		5	–	4	–	0
Michigan Mines		–		1	–	1	–	0
North Dakota Agricultural		–		3	–	3	–	1
Saint Louis		–		4	–	4	–	1
Valparaiso		–		2	–	2	–	1
Michigan Agricultural		–		3	–	5	–	0
Northern Illinois State		–		3	–	5	–	0
Earlham		–		2	–	4	–	1
St. Ignatius (OH)		–		2	–	6	–	0
Dayton		–		1	–	7	–	1
Kent State		–		0	–	2	–	1

The 1921 Central Michigan Normalites football team represented Central Michigan Normal School, later renamed Central Michigan University, as an independent during the 1921 college football season. In their first season under head coach Wallace Parker, the Central Michigan football team compiled a 7–2–1 record and shut out eight of ten opponents. The team's victories included games with Ferris Institute (7–0 and 60–0), Olivet College (25–0), Grand Rapids Junior College (7–0), and Alma (29–0). The team also played Detroit City College to a scoreless tie and lost to the 1921 Michigan State Normal Normalites football team by a close 7–6 score.

== Schedule ==
Date	Opponent	Site	Result	Source
October 1	at Ferris Institute	Big Rapids, MI	W 7–0	
October 8	Olivet	Mount Pleasant, MI	W 25–0	
October 15	Michigan State Normal	Mount Pleasant, MI (rivalry)	L 6–7	
October 22	Ferris Institute	Mount Pleasant, MI	W 60–0	
October 29	at Adrian	Adrian, MI	W 28–0	
November 5	at Grand Rapids	Grand Rapids, MI	W 7–0	
November 11	American Legion	Mount Pleasant, MI	W 28–0	
November 12	Hope	Mount Pleasant, MI	W 17–0	
November 19	Hillsdale	Mount Pleasant, MI	L 10–14	
November 24	at Detroit Junior College	Grindley Field; Detroit, MI	T 0–0	
