= Bill Cunningham (sportswriter) =

American sportswriter and college football player and coach (1896–1960)

Biographical details
- Born: 1896; Pattonville, Texas, U.S.
- Died: April 17, 1960 (aged 64); Newton, Massachusetts, U.S.

Playing career
- 1919–1920: Dartmouth
- Position: Center

Coaching career (HC unless noted)
- 1921: SMU (interim HC)

Head coaching record
- Overall: 0–5–1

Accomplishments and honors

Awards
- Second-team All-American (1920)

Elijah William Cunningham (1896 – April 17, 1960) was an American sportswriter and college football player and coach.

Cunningham was born in 1896, in Pattonville, Texas. He moved with his parents to Paris, Texas and then to Dallas as a child and graduated from Dallas' Terrill School for Boys in 1915. Cunningham then attended Dartmouth College, where he played football before graduating in 1921. He was a second-team selection to the 1920 College Football All-America Team as a center. During World War I, he served in France with the United States Army as a first lieutenant of artillery.

Returning to Dallas, he was hired by the local Dallas Morning News after graduation to be a general assignments reporter. While working for the Morning News, he was also allowed to be an assistant football coach for the 1921 SMU Mustangs. Two games into the season, head coach J. Burton Rix resigned, and SMU named Cunningham as interim head coach for the remainder of the season. He remained an employee of the Morning News while coaching the Mustangs. The team finished with a 1–6–1 record and after the season, as planned, Ray Morrison took over as coach for the upcoming 1922 season.

In 1922, The Boston Post newspaper asked Cunningham to be a guest reporter covering the fall football game between Centre College and Texas A&M University. The game was a major upset victory for Texas A&M. After filing his report with the Post, the paper offered him a full-time reporting job in Boston, which he accepted and where he remained for 19 years. He then spent another 19 years at the Boston Herald. He became a well-regarded, nationally known sportswriter, columnist and reporter during his almost 40 years in Boston. Cunningham died on April 17, 1960, at his home in Newton, Massachusetts.

== Head coaching record ==
Year	Team	Overall	Conference	Standing
SMU Mustangs (Southwest Conference / Texas Intercollegiate Athletic Association) (1921)
1921	SMU	0–5–1 (Note: J. Burton Rix served as SMU's head coach for the first two games of the season before resigning. Cunningham led the team as interim head coach for the final six games. The Mustangs compiled an overall record of 1–6–1 with marks of 0–4 in Southwest Conference play and 1–3–1 against Texas Intercollegiate Athletic Association opponents.)	0–3 / 0–3–1	7th / 7th
SMU:		0–5–1	0–5–1	
Total:		0–5–1		
