= 1921 Oklahoma Sooners football team =

American college football season

1921 Oklahoma Sooners football
- Conference: Missouri Valley Conference
- Record: 5–3 (2–3 MVC)
- Head coach: Bennie Owen (17th season)
- Offensive scheme: Single-wing
- Captain: Lawrence Haskell
- Home stadium: Boyd Field

1921 Missouri Valley Conference football standings
	Conf.					Overall
Team	W		L		T	W		L		T
Nebraska $	3	–	0	–	0	7	–	1	–	0
Kansas State	4	–	2	–	0	5	–	3	–	0
Missouri	4	–	2	–	0	6	–	2	–	0
Drake	2	–	2	–	0	5	–	2	–	0
Kansas	3	–	3	–	0	4	–	4	–	0
Iowa State	3	–	4	–	0	4	–	4	–	0
Oklahoma	2	–	3	–	0	5	–	3	–	0
Washington University	2	–	3	–	0	4	–	3	–	1
Grinnell	0	–	4	–	0	2	–	5	–	0
$ – Conference champion

The 1921 Oklahoma Sooners football team represented the University of Oklahoma as a member of the Missouri Valley Conference (MVC) during the 1921 college football season. In their 17th season under head coach Bennie Owen, the Sooners compiled an overall record of 5–3 record with a mark of 2–3 in conference play, tying for seventh in the MVC, and outscored opponents by a combined total of 127 to 102.

No Sooners were recognized as All-Americans, and end Howard Marsh was the only Sooner to receive all-conference honors.

== Schedule ==
Date	Time	Opponent	Site	Result	Attendance	Source
October 8		at Central State Teachers*	Edmond, OK	W 21–0		
October 15		Oklahoma A&M*	Boyd Field; Norman, OK (Bedlam)	W 6–0		
October 22	2:30 p.m.	Washington University	Boyd Field; Norman, OK	W 28–13	7,000	
October 29		at Nebraska	Nebraska Field; Lincoln, NE (rivalry)	L 0-44		
November 5		Kansas	Boyd Field; Norman, OK	W 24–7		
November 12		at Missouri	Rollins Field; Columbia, MO (rivalry)	L 14-24		
November 19		at Kansas State	Ahearn Field; Manhattan, KS	L 7-14		
November 24		at Rice*	Rice Field; Houston, TX	W 27–0		
*Non-conference game; All times are in Central time
