= 1921 Missouri Tigers football team =

American college football season

1921 Missouri Tigers football
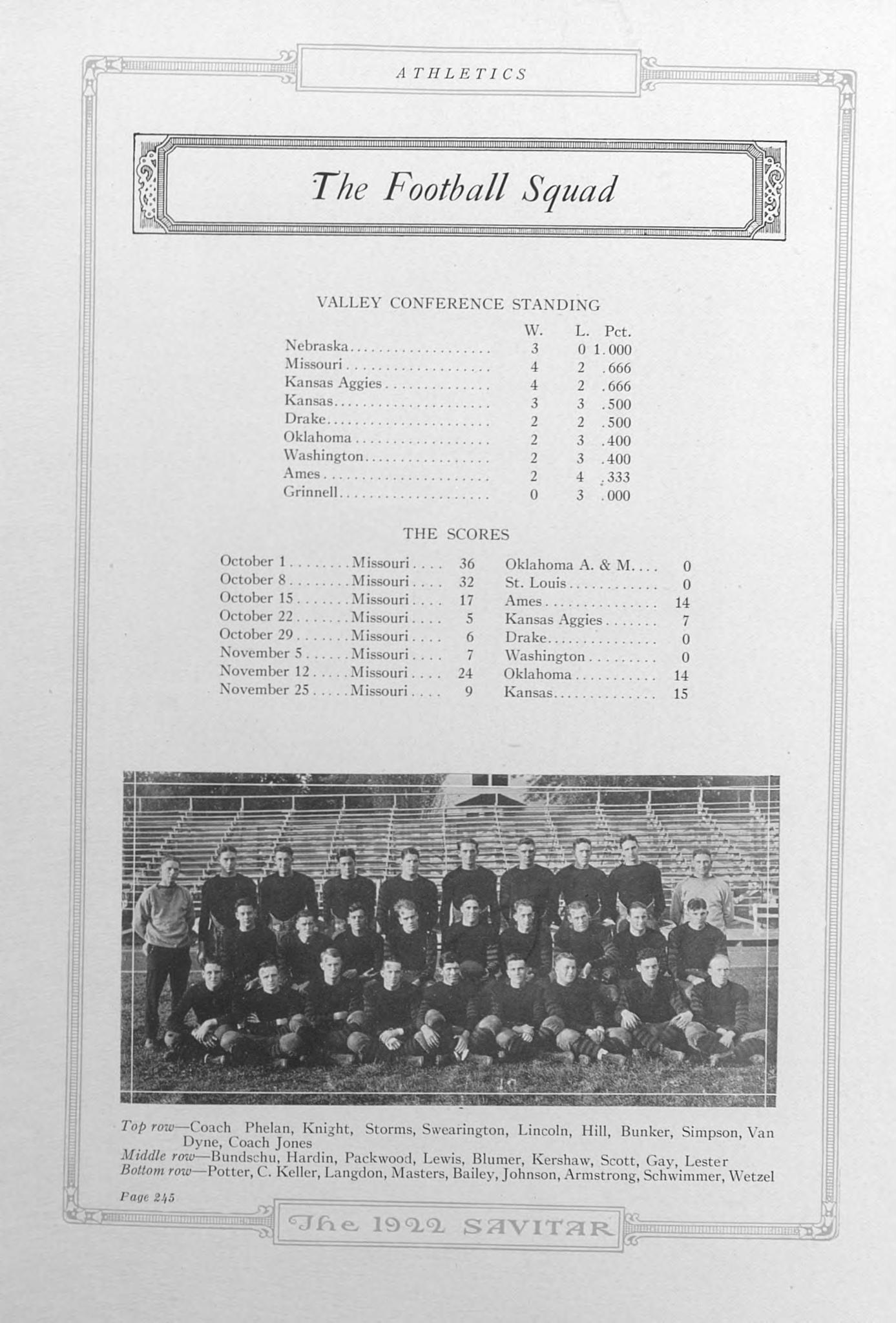
- Conference: Missouri Valley Conference
- Record: 6–2 (4–2 MVC)
- Head coach: James Phelan (2nd season)
- Captain: Herbert Blumer
- Home stadium: Rollins Field

1921 Missouri Valley Conference football standings
	Conf.					Overall
Team	W		L		T	W		L		T
Nebraska $	3	–	0	–	0	7	–	1	–	0
Kansas State	4	–	2	–	0	5	–	3	–	0
Missouri	4	–	2	–	0	6	–	2	–	0
Drake	2	–	2	–	0	5	–	2	–	0
Kansas	3	–	3	–	0	4	–	4	–	0
Iowa State	3	–	4	–	0	4	–	4	–	0
Oklahoma	2	–	3	–	0	5	–	3	–	0
Washington University	2	–	3	–	0	4	–	3	–	1
Grinnell	0	–	4	–	0	2	–	5	–	0
$ – Conference champion

The 1921 Missouri Tigers football team was an American football team that represented the University of Missouri in the Missouri Valley Intercollegiate Athletic Association (Missouri Valley) during the 1921 college football season. The team compiled a 6–2 record (4–2 against Missouri Valley opponents), finished in a tie for second place in the Missouri Valley conference, and outscored all opponents by a combined total of 136 to 50. James Phelan was the head coach for the second of two seasons. The team played its home games at Rollins Field in Columbia, Missouri.

== Schedule ==
Date	Time	Opponent	Site	Result	Attendance	Source
October 1		Oklahoma A&M*	Rollins Field; Columbia, MO	W 36–0		
October 8		at Saint Louis*	Sportsman's Park; St. Louis, MO	W 32–0		
October 15		Iowa State	Rollins Field; Columbia, MO (rivalry)	W 17–14		
October 22		at Kansas State	Ahearn Field; Manhattan, KS	L 5–7		
October 29		Drake	Rollins Field; Columbia, MO	W 6–0		
November 5	2:30 p.m.	at Washington University	Francis Field; St. Louis, MO	W 7–0	12,000	
November 12		Oklahoma	Rollins Field; Columbia, MO (rivalry)	W 24–14		
November 24		at Kansas	Lawrence, KS (rivalry)	L 9–15		
*Non-conference game; All times are in Central time
