= 1921 Tennessee Volunteers football team =

American college football season

1921 Tennessee Volunteers football
- Conference: Southern Intercollegiate Athletic Association
- Record: 6–2–1 (4–1–1 SIAA)
- Head coach: M. B. Banks (1st season)
- Captain: Hal Blair
- Home stadium: Shields–Watkins Field

1921 Southern Intercollegiate Athletic Association football standings
	Conf.					Overall
Team	W		L		T	W		L		T
Centre +	5	–	0	–	0	10	–	1	–	0
Georgia +	6	–	0	–	1	7	–	2	–	1
Georgia Tech +	5	–	0	–	0	8	–	1	–	0
Vanderbilt +	5	–	0	–	1	7	–	0	–	1
Tennessee	4	–	1	–	1	6	–	2	–	1
Florida	4	–	1	–	2	6	–	3	–	2
Mississippi College	3	–	1	–	1	7	–	2	–	1
Sewanee	4	–	2	–	0	6	–	2	–	0
Transylvania	2	–	1	–	0	4	–	4	–	0
LSU	2	–	1	–	1	6	–	1	–	1
South Carolina	2	–	1	–	1	5	–	1	–	2
Furman	4	–	2	–	1	7	–	2	–	1
Auburn	3	–	2	–	0	5	–	3	–	0
Mississippi A&M	2	–	3	–	1	4	–	4	–	1
Tulane	3	–	4	–	0	4	–	6	–	0
Alabama	2	–	4	–	2	5	–	4	–	2
Oglethorpe	2	–	4	–	0	5	–	4	–	0
Chattanooga	2	–	4	–	0	4	–	6	–	0
The Citadel	1	–	2	–	1	3	–	3	–	2
Kentucky	1	–	3	–	1	4	–	3	–	1
Ole Miss	1	–	4	–	0	3	–	6	–	0
Howard (AL)	1	–	4	–	0	3	–	6	–	0
Mercer	1	–	5	–	0	3	–	6	–	0
Louisville	0	–	1	–	0	2	–	2	–	1
Wofford	0	–	2	–	0	2	–	7	–	0
Georgetown (KY)	0	–	3	–	0	2	–	6	–	0
Millsaps	0	–	3	–	0	1	–	5	–	1
Clemson	0	–	5	–	2	1	–	6	–	2
+ – Conference co-champions

The 1921 Tennessee Volunteers football team (variously "Tennessee", "UT" or the "Vols") represented the University of Tennessee in the 1921 college football season. Playing as a member of the Southern Intercollegiate Athletic Association (SIAA), the team was led by head coach M. B. Banks, in his first year, and played their home games at Shields–Watkins Field in Knoxville, Tennessee. They finished the season with 6–2–1 overall and 4–1–1 in the SIAA. The Volunteers offense scored 102 points while the defense allowed 35 points.

== Schedule ==
Date	Opponent	Site	Result	Source
September 24	Emory and Henry*	Shields–Watkins Field; Knoxville, TN	W 27–0	
October 1	Maryville (TN)*	Shields–Watkins Field; Knoxville, TN	W 7–0	
October 8	Chattanooga	Shields–Watkins Field; Knoxville, TN	W 21–0	
October 15	at Dartmouth*	Alumni Oval; Hanover, NH	L 3–14	
October 22	Florida	Shields–Watkins Field; Knoxville, TN (rivalry)	W 9–0	
October 29	at Vanderbilt	Dudley Field; Nashville, TN (rivalry)	L 0–14	
November 5	vs. Mississippi A&M	Hodges Field; Memphis, TN	W 14–7	
November 12	Sewanee	Shields–Watkins Field; Knoxville, TN	W 21–0	
November 24	at Kentucky	Stoll Field; Lexington, KY (rivalry)	T 0–0	
*Non-conference game
