= 1921 Florida Gators football team =

American college football season

1921 Florida Gators football
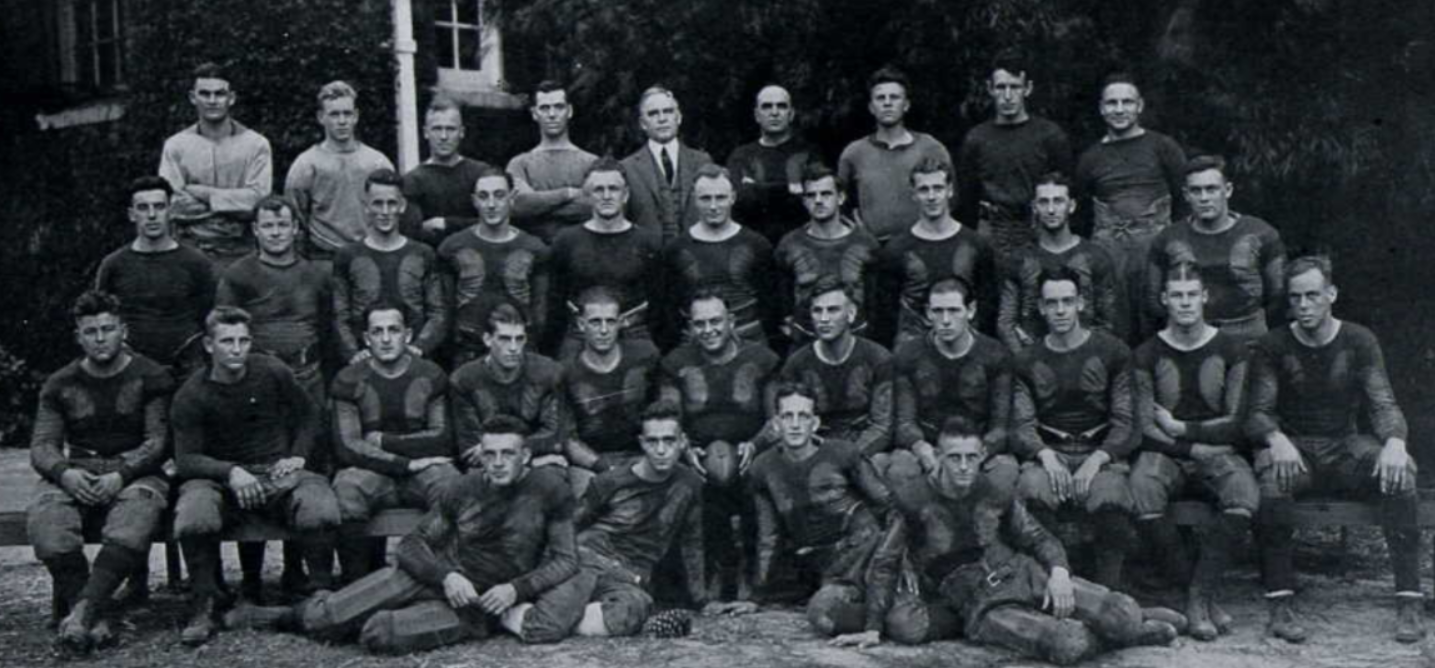
- Conference: Southern Intercollegiate Athletic Association
- Record: 6–3–2 (4–1–2 SIAA)
- Head coach: William G. Kline (2nd season)
- Captain: Tootie Perry
- Home stadium: Fleming Field

Uniform
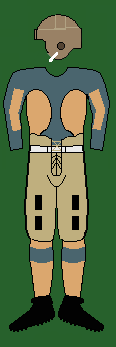

1921 Southern Intercollegiate Athletic Association football standings
	Conf.					Overall
Team	W		L		T	W		L		T
Centre +	5	–	0	–	0	10	–	1	–	0
Georgia +	6	–	0	–	1	7	–	2	–	1
Georgia Tech +	5	–	0	–	0	8	–	1	–	0
Vanderbilt +	5	–	0	–	1	7	–	0	–	1
Tennessee	4	–	1	–	1	6	–	2	–	1
Florida	4	–	1	–	2	6	–	3	–	2
Mississippi College	3	–	1	–	1	7	–	2	–	1
Sewanee	4	–	2	–	0	6	–	2	–	0
Transylvania	2	–	1	–	0	4	–	4	–	0
LSU	2	–	1	–	1	6	–	1	–	1
South Carolina	2	–	1	–	1	5	–	1	–	2
Furman	4	–	2	–	1	7	–	2	–	1
Auburn	3	–	2	–	0	5	–	3	–	0
Mississippi A&M	2	–	3	–	1	4	–	4	–	1
Tulane	3	–	4	–	0	4	–	6	–	0
Alabama	2	–	4	–	2	5	–	4	–	2
Oglethorpe	2	–	4	–	0	5	–	4	–	0
Chattanooga	2	–	4	–	0	4	–	6	–	0
The Citadel	1	–	2	–	1	3	–	3	–	2
Kentucky	1	–	3	–	1	4	–	3	–	1
Ole Miss	1	–	4	–	0	3	–	6	–	0
Howard (AL)	1	–	4	–	0	3	–	6	–	0
Mercer	1	–	5	–	0	3	–	6	–	0
Louisville	0	–	1	–	0	2	–	2	–	1
Wofford	0	–	2	–	0	2	–	7	–	0
Georgetown (KY)	0	–	3	–	0	2	–	6	–	0
Millsaps	0	–	3	–	0	1	–	5	–	1
Clemson	0	–	5	–	2	1	–	6	–	2
+ – Conference co-champions

The 1921 Florida Gators football team (variously "Florida", "Gators", or "UF") represented the University of Florida in the 1921 college football season. It marked the Florida Gators' 15th overall season, and its 9th and final as a member of the Southern Intercollegiate Athletic Association (SIAA). The Gators played their home games at Fleming Field in Gainesville, Florida. It was head coach William Kline's second season leading the Gators' football team. They finished the season with a record of 6 wins, 3 losses, and 2 ties (6–3–2 overall, 4–1–2 in the SIAA), finishing sixth in conference play.

The Gators improved their record against major collegiate competition with a notable win against the Alabama Crimson Tide (9–2) in Tuscaloosa, Alabama. Florida's two losses against the Tennessee Volunteers (0–9) and the North Carolina Tar Heels (10–14) were competitive and close.

Coach Herman Stegeman of Georgia wrote in Spalding's Football Guide "Florida, for the first time, had a strong team. Aided by Dixon, the South's best punter, they combined a kicking game and a well-diversified offense to good advantage." Captain Tootie Perry was the school's first-ever All-Southern selection.

== Before the season ==
Professor of military science James Van Fleet joined Kline's coaching staff.

Kline's staff faced heavy pressure from the alumni for a winning football team and so "five players were brought the University of Oklahoma and the western states" such as Ferdinand H. Duncan and Ark Newton. Newton allegedly first attended a practice only to watch, but the captain Tootie Perry was so impressed when he saw him that he offered Newton a uniform and coaxed him onto the field. Newton's punts sailed over the head of the return men and brought the attention of the coaches.

== Schedule ==
Date	Opponent	Site	Result	Attendance
October 1	at Fort Benning*	Columbus, GA	W 6–0	4,500
October 8	at Rollins*	Orlando, FL	W 33–0	
October 10	Carlstrom Field*	Fleming Field; Gainesville, FL	L 0–19	
October 15	Mercer	Fleming Field; Gainesville, FL	W 7–0	
October 22	at Tennessee	Shields–Watkins Field; Knoxville, TN (rivalry)	L 0–9	
October 29	vs. Howard (AL)	Gunter Park; Montgomery, AL	W 34–0	200
November 5	vs. South Carolina	Plant Field; Tampa, FL	T 7–7	
November 12	at Alabama	Denny Field; Tuscaloosa, AL (rivalry)	W 9–2	5,000
November 18	Mississippi College	Fleming Field; Gainesville, FL	T 7–7	
November 26	Oglethorpe	Fleming Field; Gainesville, FL	W 21–3	
December 3	vs. North Carolina*	Barrs Field; Jacksonville, FL	L 10–14	7,500
*Non-conference game

== Game summaries ==
=== Week 1: at Camp Benning ===
Week 1: Florida at Camp Benning

Team	1	2	3	4	Total
• Florida	0	0	6	0	6
Infantry	0	0	0	0	0

- Date: October 1
- Location: Columbus, Georgia
- Game attendance: 4,500

A blocked punt proved the difference in the Gators' first win of the season over Camp Benning in Columbus, Georgia 6–0.

In the third quarter, Camp Benning's Crist attempted punt was blocked and recovered by Florida at the 20-yard line. Bill Renfro ran through the tackles for seven yards on first down. T. Hoyt Carlton ran the remaining 13 yards to score. Dickson missed goal.

The starting lineup was: Swanson (left end), Wuthrich (left tackle), Scott (left guard), Perry (center), Rosenhouse (right guard), Doty (right tackle), Duncan (right end), Renfro (quarterback), Newton (left halfback), Carlton (right halfback), Dickson (fullback).

=== Week 2: Rollins ===
Week 2: Rollins at Florida

Team	1	2	3	4	Total
Rollins	0	0	0	0	0
• Florida	8	0	7	18	33

- Date: October 8

Florida rolled up a large, 33–0 score on the Rollins Tars. In the fourth quarter, T. Hoyt Carlton faked a kick and ran 40 yards for the touchdown; the first of three scored by the Gators in the final period.

The starting lineup was: Swanson (left end), Wuthrich (left tackle), H. Perry (left guard), Wilsky (center), C. Perry (right guard), Doty (right tackle), Duncan (right end), Renfro (quarterback), Beasley (left halfback), Carlton (right halfback), Newton (fullback).

=== Week 3: Carlstrom Field ===
Week 3: Carlstrom Field at Florida

Team	1	2	3	4	Total
• Aviators	0	13	0	6	19
Florida	0	0	0	0	0

- Date: October 10
- Location: Gainesville, Florida

The Gators lost to Carlstrom Field and its "baffling" display of passes and defense 19–0. Gene Vidal's attempted drop kick was blocked, but he caught the ball off the rebound and ran 20 yards before the time spectators realized what happened.

The starting lineup was: Swanson (left end), Doty (left tackle), C. Perry (left guard), Wilsky (center), Scott (right guard), Wuthrich (right tackle), Duncan (right end), Renfro (quarterback), Carlton (left halfback), Beasley (right halfback), Newton (fullback).

=== Week 4: Mercer ===
Week 4: Mercer at Florida

Team	1	2	3	4	Total
Mercer	0	0	0	0	0
• Florida	7	0	0	0	7

- Date: October 15
- Location: Gainesville, Florida
- Referee: Buie (Davidson)

The Gators defeated Josh Cody's Mercer Baptists 7–0. After a 30–0 loss last year, Mercer took it as a moral victory against a stronger Florida team this season.

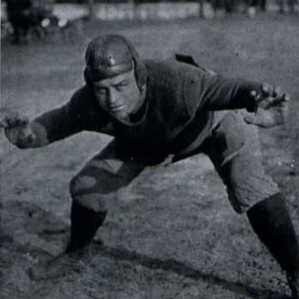
Tootie Perry.

"Capt. Tootie Perry was again the star on defense." He recovered a Mercer fumble on the 15-yard line. On the ensuing fourth down T. Hoyt Carlton ran in a touchdown. Wilsky kicked goal.

The starting lineup was: Swanson (left end), Wuthrich (left tackle), H. Perry (left guard), Wilsky (center), C. Perry (right guard), Doty (right tackle), Burnett (right end), Carlton (quarterback), Duncan (left halfback), Renfro (right halfback), Newton (fullback).

=== Week 5: at Tennessee ===
Week 5: Florida at Tennessee

Team	1	2	3	4	Total
Florida	0	0	0	0	0
• Tennessee	0	9	0	0	9

- Date: October 22
- Location: Knoxville, Tennessee
- Referee: Parrish (VMI)

The Tennessee Volunteers defeated Florida 9 to 0. Florida was inside Tennessee's 30-yard line just once, failing to convert a field goal. Tennessee's touchdown and safety were thanks to the forward pass. The safety was an interception by Florida tackled in the endzone. The Vols' Roe Campbell averaged 50 yards on 14 punts.

The starting lineup was: Swanson (left end), Wuthrich (left tackle), Robinson (left guard), Wilsky (center), C. Perry (right guard), Doty (right tackle), Burnett (right end), Carlton (quarterback), Duncan (left halfback), Renfro (right halfback), Newton (fullback).

=== Week 6: at Howard ===
In a "drizzling rain" and "sea of mud" in Montgomery, AL Florida defeated the Howard Bulldogs 34–0 and gave up just one first down.

=== Week 7: South Carolina ===
Week 7: South Carolina at Florida

Team	1	2	3	4	Total
S. Carolina	7	0	0	0	7
Florida	0	7	0	0	7

- Date: November 5
- Location: Plant Field
  Tampa, Florida
- Referee: Hutchinson (Purdue)

In a game in Tampa on Plant Field, coach Sol Metzger's South Carolina Gamecocks fought the Gators to a 7–7 tie. The Gamecocks scored early after a fumble recovery near the goal line. The Gators scored once in the second period, and "threatened to do so again and again from both attempted placement kicks and straight football, only to fall by missing the cross bars by inches and by gameness of the fighting Gamecocks."

The Gators starting lineup was: Swanson (left end), Wurthrich (left tackle), Scott (left guard), Wilsky (center), C. Perry (right guard), Doty (right tackle), Burnett (right end), Stanley (quarterback), Duncan (left halfback), Carlton (right halfback), Dickson (fullback).

=== Week 8: at Alabama ===
Week 8: Florida at Alabama

Team	1	2	3	4	Total
• Florida	6	0	0	3	9
Alabama	0	0	2	0	2

- Date: November 11
- Location: Tuscaloosa, Alabama
- Game attendance: 5,000

In the Gators first ever win over the Alabama Crimson Tide, Ferdinand H. Duncan accounted for all of Florida's points to upset the Tide at homecoming 9–2.

After an early exchange of punts, Florida started with the ball on its 45-yard line. Duncan and Ark Newton, with one run from T. Hoyt Carlton, worked the ball down for the game's lone touchdown. Alabama scored on a safety after blocking a Ray Dickson punt into the endzone. A 20-yard drop kick was the Gators' final score.

The starting lineup was: Swanson (left end), Robinson (left tackle), H. Perry (left guard), Wilsky (center), C. Perry (right guard), Scott (right tackle), Burnett (right end), Stanley (quarterback), Duncan (left halfback), Pomeroy (right halfback), Newton (fullback).

=== Week 9: Mississippi College ===
Week 9: Mississippi College at Florida

Team	1	2	3	4	Total
Mississippi	0	7	0	0	7
Florida	0	0	0	7	7

- Date: November 18
- Location: Gainesville, Florida

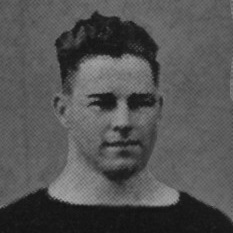
Goat Hale.

Florida battled coach Stanley L. Robinson's Mississippi College Choctaws to a 7–7 tie. Florida had the greater weight and Mississippi College the greater speed.

Led by Hall of Fame quarterback Goat Hale, the Choctaws controlled the first half. In the middle of the fourth quarter, Florida led a comeback, scoring the tying touchdown after a series of forward passes. During the game, Ark Newton had a 92-yard punt.

=== Week 10: Oglethorpe ===
Week 10: Oglethorpe at Florida

Team	1	2	3	4	Total
Oglethorpe	0	0	3	0	3
• Florida	14	7	0	0	21

- Date: November 25
- Location: Gainesville, Florida

Florida defeated coach Jogger Elcock's Oglethorpe Stormy Petrels 21–3, keeping the ball in Oglethorpe's territory most of the game. The Gators scored all 21 points in the first half, including two touchdowns in the first five minutes.

The first touchdown was scored by a short run behind center from Ferdinand H. Duncan. An Oglethorpe punt was later blocked by Tootie Perry, recovered by Swanson for a touchdown. Ark Newton made both extra points. Oglethorpe intercepted a Florida pass at the 5-yard line. Perry and Merrin broke through the line, blocking the ensuing punt. Thomas then fell on the ball for Florida's final touchdown and Newton again kicked goal. A 28-yard drop kick from Oglethorpe's Morris got its points.

== Postseason ==
=== Week 11: North Carolina ===
Week 11: North Carolina at Florida

Team	1	2	3	4	Total
• N. Carolina	0	7	7	0	14
Florida	3	0	7	0	10

- Date: December 3, 1921
- Location: Jacksonville, Florida
- Game attendance: 7,500

Scheduled since November, the Gators met the North Carolina Tar Heels in a postseason contest at Jacksonville, Florida on December 3. It was the first ever meeting between the two schools. Despite outweighing the Tar Heels, the Gators lost 14 to 10.

Florida's scores came on Dickson's goal from placement and a 20-yard pass from Dickson to Carlton.

The starting lineup was: Swanson (left end), Robinson (left tackle), Gunn (left guard), Wilksy (center), C. Perry (guard), Doty (tackle), Duncan (end), Carlton (quarterback), Pomeroy (left halfback), Newton (right halfback), Dickson (fullback).

=== Awards and honors ===
Tootie Perry was the first Gator ever selected for an All-Southern team following the 1921 season. Among the selectors who honored Perry as such were J. L. Ray of the Nashville Banner, George A. Butler of the Chattanooga News, and John Snell of the Enquirer-Sun.

== Players ==
=== Line ===
Number	Player	Position	Games started	Hometown	Prep school	Height	Weight	Age
	R. H. Burnett	end				5'10"	180	
	Arthur Doty	tackle				6'0"	198	
	Ferdinand H. Duncan	end		Sioux City, Iowa	University of South Dakota	6'2"	200	
	Erret "Shorty" Gunn	center		Kissimmee		6'6"	200	
	Mervin Mounts	end				5'9"	155	
13	Carl "Tootie" Perry	guard		Rochelle	Gainesville High	5'10"	230	25
	Henry Perry	guard				6'0"	247	
	Robbie Robinson	tackle		Mobile, Alabama		6'0"	179	19
	Moses Rosenhouse	guard				5'8"	193	
	Ivan Scott	guard				6'0"	180	
	Robert Swanson	end		Texarkana		6'0"	170	
	Horace Tolbert	guard				5'7"	200	
	Charlie Wilsky	center				5'10"	170	
	Emory Wuthrich	tackle				5'8"	185	

=== Backfield ===
Player	Position	Games started	Hometown	Prep school	Height	Weight	Age
Tully Hoyt Carlton	fullback		Wauchula		6'0"	160	
J. O'Neal Cox	halfback				5'7"	150	
Ray Dickson	fullback				6'0"	202	
James Merrin	fullback		Rackmore, Georgia		5'10"	155	
Ark Newton	halfback		Camden, Arkansas	Camden High	6'0"	181	18
Stewart Pomeroy	halfback		Tampa		5'6"	150	
Bill Renfroe	quarterback				5'8"	160	
George Stanley	quarterback		Jacksonville		5'8"	148	

== See also ==
- 1921 College Football All-Southern Team
- 1921 Southern Intercollegiate Athletic Association football season

== Books ==
- Carlson, Norm (2007). University of Florida Football Vault: The History of the Florida Gators. Atlanta, Georgia: Whitman Publishing, LLC. ISBN 0-7948-2298-3.
- Graham, Klein. History of the University of Florida.
- McEwen, Tom (1974). The Gators: A Story of Florida Football. Huntsville, Alabama: The Strode Publishers. ISBN 0-87397-025-X.
