= 1921 Kentucky Wildcats football team =

American college football season

1921 Kentucky Wildcats football
- Conference: Southern Intercollegiate Athletic Association
- Record: 4–3–1 (1–3–1 SIAA)
- Head coach: William Juneau (2nd season)
- Captain: Jim Server
- Home stadium: Stoll Field

1921 Southern Intercollegiate Athletic Association football standings
	Conf.					Overall
Team	W		L		T	W		L		T
Centre +	5	–	0	–	0	10	–	1	–	0
Georgia +	6	–	0	–	1	7	–	2	–	1
Georgia Tech +	5	–	0	–	0	8	–	1	–	0
Vanderbilt +	5	–	0	–	1	7	–	0	–	1
Tennessee	4	–	1	–	1	6	–	2	–	1
Florida	4	–	1	–	2	6	–	3	–	2
Mississippi College	3	–	1	–	1	7	–	2	–	1
Sewanee	4	–	2	–	0	6	–	2	–	0
Transylvania	2	–	1	–	0	4	–	4	–	0
LSU	2	–	1	–	1	6	–	1	–	1
South Carolina	2	–	1	–	1	5	–	1	–	2
Furman	4	–	2	–	1	7	–	2	–	1
Auburn	3	–	2	–	0	5	–	3	–	0
Mississippi A&M	2	–	3	–	1	4	–	4	–	1
Tulane	3	–	4	–	0	4	–	6	–	0
Alabama	2	–	4	–	2	5	–	4	–	2
Oglethorpe	2	–	4	–	0	5	–	4	–	0
Chattanooga	2	–	4	–	0	4	–	6	–	0
The Citadel	1	–	2	–	1	3	–	3	–	2
Kentucky	1	–	3	–	1	4	–	3	–	1
Ole Miss	1	–	4	–	0	3	–	6	–	0
Howard (AL)	1	–	4	–	0	3	–	6	–	0
Mercer	1	–	5	–	0	3	–	6	–	0
Louisville	0	–	1	–	0	2	–	2	–	1
Wofford	0	–	2	–	0	2	–	7	–	0
Georgetown (KY)	0	–	3	–	0	2	–	6	–	0
Millsaps	0	–	3	–	0	1	–	5	–	1
Clemson	0	–	5	–	2	1	–	6	–	2
+ – Conference co-champions

The 1921 Kentucky Wildcats football team represented the University of Kentucky as a member of the Southern Intercollegiate Athletic Association (SIAA) during the 1921 college football season. Led by second-year head coach William Juneau, the Wildcats compiled an overall record of 4–3–1 with a mark of 1–3–1 in SIAA play.

== Schedule ==
Date	Opponent	Site	Result	Attendance	Source
October 1	Kentucky Wesleyan*	Stoll Field; Lexington, KY	W 68–0		
October 8	Marshall*	Stoll Field; Lexington, KY	W 28–0		
October 15	Vanderbilt	Stoll Field; Lexington, KY (rivalry)	L 14–21	5,000	
October 21	Georgetown (KY)	Stoll Field; Lexington, KY	W 33–0		
October 29	vs. Sewanee	Eclipse Park; Louisville, KY	L 0–6		
November 5	at Centre	Cheek Field; Danville, KY (rivalry)	L 0–55		
November 12	VMI*	Eclipse Park; Louisville, KY	W 14–7		
November 24	Tennessee	Stoll Field; Lexington, KY (rivalry)	T 0–0		
*Non-conference game
