= 1921 Mercer Baptists football team =

American college football season

1921 Mercer Baptists football
- Conference: Southern Intercollegiate Athletic Association
- Record: 3–6 (1–5 SIAA)
- Head coach: Josh Cody (2nd season)
- Home stadium: Alumni Field

1921 Southern Intercollegiate Athletic Association football standings
	Conf.					Overall
Team	W		L		T	W		L		T
Centre +	5	–	0	–	0	10	–	1	–	0
Georgia +	6	–	0	–	1	7	–	2	–	1
Georgia Tech +	5	–	0	–	0	8	–	1	–	0
Vanderbilt +	5	–	0	–	1	7	–	0	–	1
Tennessee	4	–	1	–	1	6	–	2	–	1
Florida	4	–	1	–	2	6	–	3	–	2
Mississippi College	3	–	1	–	1	7	–	2	–	1
Sewanee	4	–	2	–	0	6	–	2	–	0
Transylvania	2	–	1	–	0	4	–	4	–	0
LSU	2	–	1	–	1	6	–	1	–	1
South Carolina	2	–	1	–	1	5	–	1	–	2
Furman	4	–	2	–	1	7	–	2	–	1
Auburn	3	–	2	–	0	5	–	3	–	0
Mississippi A&M	2	–	3	–	1	4	–	4	–	1
Tulane	3	–	4	–	0	4	–	6	–	0
Alabama	2	–	4	–	2	5	–	4	–	2
Oglethorpe	2	–	4	–	0	5	–	4	–	0
Chattanooga	2	–	4	–	0	4	–	6	–	0
The Citadel	1	–	2	–	1	3	–	3	–	2
Kentucky	1	–	3	–	1	4	–	3	–	1
Ole Miss	1	–	4	–	0	3	–	6	–	0
Howard (AL)	1	–	4	–	0	3	–	6	–	0
Mercer	1	–	5	–	0	3	–	6	–	0
Louisville	0	–	1	–	0	2	–	2	–	1
Wofford	0	–	2	–	0	2	–	7	–	0
Georgetown (KY)	0	–	3	–	0	2	–	6	–	0
Millsaps	0	–	3	–	0	1	–	5	–	1
Clemson	0	–	5	–	2	1	–	6	–	2
+ – Conference co-champions

The 1921 Mercer Baptists football team was an American football team that represented Mercer University as a member of the Southern Intercollegiate Athletic Association (SIAA) during the 1921 college football season. In their second season under head coach Josh Cody, Mercer compiled a 3–6 record.

== Schedule ==
Date	Opponent	Site	Result	Source
October 1	at Georgia	Sanford Field; Athens, GA	L 0–28	
October 8	at Vanderbilt	Dudley Field; Nashville, TN	L 0–42	
October 15	at Florida	Fleming Field; Gainesville, FL	L 0–7	
October 21	Birmingham–Southern*	Alumni Field; Macon, GA	W 20–0	
October 28	Stetson*	Alumni Field; Macon, GA	W 41–0	
November 5	at Furman	Manly Field; Greenville, SC	L 0–37	
November 12	Oglethorpe	Alumni Field; Macon, GA	L 6–7	
November 19	Chattanooga	Alumni Field; Macon, GA	W 18–0	
November 24	at Camp Benning*	Driving Park; Columbus, GA	L 7–24	
*Non-conference game
