= 1921 Furman Purple Hurricane football team =

American college football season

1921 Furman Purple Hurricane football

State champion
- Conference: Southern Intercollegiate Athletic Association
- Record: 7–2–1 (3–2–1 SIAA)
- Head coach: Billy Laval (7th season)
- Home stadium: Manly Field

1921 Southern Intercollegiate Athletic Association football standings
	Conf.					Overall
Team	W		L		T	W		L		T
Centre +	5	–	0	–	0	10	–	1	–	0
Georgia +	6	–	0	–	1	7	–	2	–	1
Georgia Tech +	5	–	0	–	0	8	–	1	–	0
Vanderbilt +	5	–	0	–	1	7	–	0	–	1
Tennessee	4	–	1	–	1	6	–	2	–	1
Florida	4	–	1	–	2	6	–	3	–	2
Mississippi College	3	–	1	–	1	7	–	2	–	1
Sewanee	4	–	2	–	0	6	–	2	–	0
Transylvania	2	–	1	–	0	4	–	4	–	0
LSU	2	–	1	–	1	6	–	1	–	1
South Carolina	2	–	1	–	1	5	–	1	–	2
Furman	4	–	2	–	1	7	–	2	–	1
Auburn	3	–	2	–	0	5	–	3	–	0
Mississippi A&M	2	–	3	–	1	4	–	4	–	1
Tulane	3	–	4	–	0	4	–	6	–	0
Alabama	2	–	4	–	2	5	–	4	–	2
Oglethorpe	2	–	4	–	0	5	–	4	–	0
Chattanooga	2	–	4	–	0	4	–	6	–	0
The Citadel	1	–	2	–	1	3	–	3	–	2
Kentucky	1	–	3	–	1	4	–	3	–	1
Ole Miss	1	–	4	–	0	3	–	6	–	0
Howard (AL)	1	–	4	–	0	3	–	6	–	0
Mercer	1	–	5	–	0	3	–	6	–	0
Louisville	0	–	1	–	0	2	–	2	–	1
Wofford	0	–	2	–	0	2	–	7	–	0
Georgetown (KY)	0	–	3	–	0	2	–	6	–	0
Millsaps	0	–	3	–	0	1	–	5	–	1
Clemson	0	–	5	–	2	1	–	6	–	2
+ – Conference co-champions

The 1921 Furman Purple Hurricane football team represented the Furman University as a member of the Southern Intercollegiate Athletic Association (SIAA) during the 1921 college football season. Led by seventh-year head coach Billy Laval, the Purple Hurricane compiled an overall record of 7–2–1 with a mark of 3–2–1 in SIAA play.

== Schedule ==
Date	Opponent	Site	Result	Attendance	Source
September 24	Erskine*	Manly Field; Greenville, SC	W 42–7	2,200	
October 1	Newberry*	Manly Field; Greenville, SC	W 63–0		
October 8	at Georgia	Sanford Field; Athens, GA	L 7–27		
October 15	at Georgia Tech	Grant Field; Atlanta, GA	L 0–69		
October 21	Clemson	Manly Field; Greenville, SC	T 0–0		
October 29	The Citadel	Manly Field; Greenville, SC (rivalry)	W 42–0		
November 5	Mercer	Manly Field; Greenville, SC	W 37–0		
November 20	South Carolina*	Manly Field; Greenville, SC	W 7–0		
November 19	Wofford	Manly Field; Greenville, SC (rivalry)	W 62–0		
November 24	Davidson*	Manly Field; Greenville, SC	W 28–0	4,000	
*Non-conference game
