= 1921 Auburn Tigers football team =

American college football season

1921 Auburn Tigers football
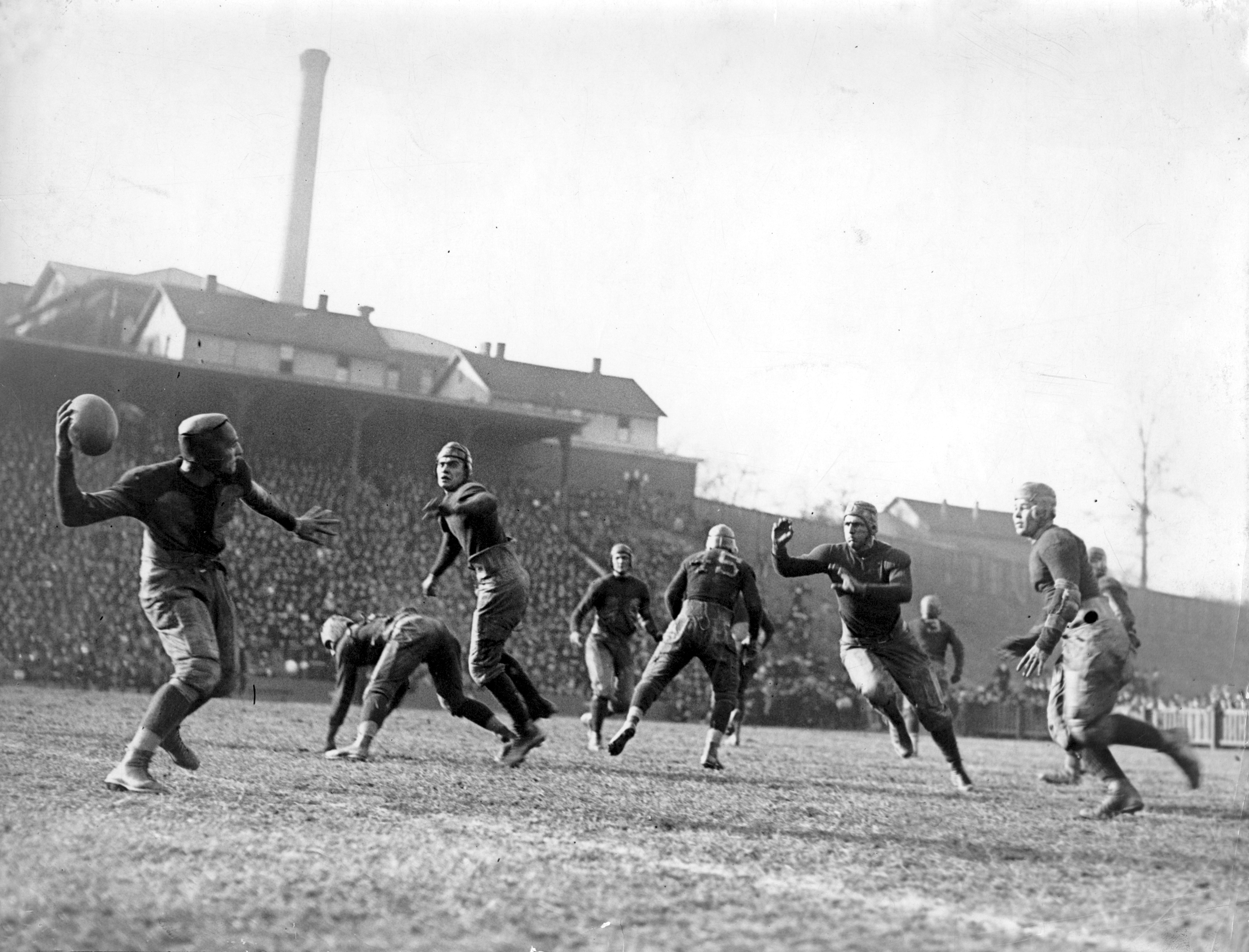
- Auburn vs. George Tech game on November 24
- Conference: Southern Intercollegiate Athletic Association
- Record: 5–3 (3–2 SIAA)
- Head coach: Mike Donahue (17th season)
- Base defense: 7–2–2
- Captain: Noah Caton
- Home stadium: Drake Field; Rickwood Field

1921 Southern Intercollegiate Athletic Association football standings
	Conf.					Overall
Team	W		L		T	W		L		T
Centre +	5	–	0	–	0	10	–	1	–	0
Georgia +	6	–	0	–	1	7	–	2	–	1
Georgia Tech +	5	–	0	–	0	8	–	1	–	0
Vanderbilt +	5	–	0	–	1	7	–	0	–	1
Tennessee	4	–	1	–	1	6	–	2	–	1
Florida	4	–	1	–	2	6	–	3	–	2
Mississippi College	3	–	1	–	1	7	–	2	–	1
Sewanee	4	–	2	–	0	6	–	2	–	0
Transylvania	2	–	1	–	0	4	–	4	–	0
LSU	2	–	1	–	1	6	–	1	–	1
South Carolina	2	–	1	–	1	5	–	1	–	2
Furman	4	–	2	–	1	7	–	2	–	1
Auburn	3	–	2	–	0	5	–	3	–	0
Mississippi A&M	2	–	3	–	1	4	–	4	–	1
Tulane	3	–	4	–	0	4	–	6	–	0
Alabama	2	–	4	–	2	5	–	4	–	2
Oglethorpe	2	–	4	–	0	5	–	4	–	0
Chattanooga	2	–	4	–	0	4	–	6	–	0
The Citadel	1	–	2	–	1	3	–	3	–	2
Kentucky	1	–	3	–	1	4	–	3	–	1
Ole Miss	1	–	4	–	0	3	–	6	–	0
Howard (AL)	1	–	4	–	0	3	–	6	–	0
Mercer	1	–	5	–	0	3	–	6	–	0
Louisville	0	–	1	–	0	2	–	2	–	1
Wofford	0	–	2	–	0	2	–	7	–	0
Georgetown (KY)	0	–	3	–	0	2	–	6	–	0
Millsaps	0	–	3	–	0	1	–	5	–	1
Clemson	0	–	5	–	2	1	–	6	–	2
+ – Conference co-champions

The 1921 Auburn Tigers football team represented Auburn University in the 1921 college football season. It was the Tigers' 30th season and they competed as a member of the Southern Intercollegiate Athletic Association (SIAA). The team was led by head coach Mike Donahue, in his 17th year, and played their home games at Drake Field in Auburn, Alabama. They finished with a record of five wins and three losses (5–3 overall, 3–2 in the SIAA).

== Schedule ==
Date	Opponent	Site	Result	Source
October 1	at Howard (AL)	Rickwood Field; Birmingham, AL	W 35–2	
October 8	Spring Hill*	Gunter Park; Montgomery, AL	W 44–0	
October 14	Clemson	Drake Field; Auburn, AL	W 56–0	
October 22	Fort Benning*	Drake Field; Auburn, AL	W 14–7	
October 29	vs. Georgia	Memorial Stadium; Columbus, GA (rivalry)	L 0–7	
November 5	at Tulane	Tulane Stadium; New Orleans, LA (rivalry)	W 14–0	
November 12	Centre*	Rickwood Field; Birmingham, AL	L 0–21	
November 24	at Georgia Tech	Grant Field; Atlanta, GA (rivalry)	L 0–14	
*Non-conference game
