= 1921 Mississippi A&M Aggies football team =

American college football season

1921 Mississippi A&M Aggies football
- Conference: Southern Intercollegiate Athletic Association
- Record: 4–4–1 (2–3–1 SIAA)
- Head coach: Ferdinand Holtkamp (2nd season)
- Home stadium: Scott Field

1921 Southern Intercollegiate Athletic Association football standings
	Conf.					Overall
Team	W		L		T	W		L		T
Centre +	5	–	0	–	0	10	–	1	–	0
Georgia +	6	–	0	–	1	7	–	2	–	1
Georgia Tech +	5	–	0	–	0	8	–	1	–	0
Vanderbilt +	5	–	0	–	1	7	–	0	–	1
Tennessee	4	–	1	–	1	6	–	2	–	1
Florida	4	–	1	–	2	6	–	3	–	2
Mississippi College	3	–	1	–	1	7	–	2	–	1
Sewanee	4	–	2	–	0	6	–	2	–	0
Transylvania	2	–	1	–	0	4	–	4	–	0
LSU	2	–	1	–	1	6	–	1	–	1
South Carolina	2	–	1	–	1	5	–	1	–	2
Furman	4	–	2	–	1	7	–	2	–	1
Auburn	3	–	2	–	0	5	–	3	–	0
Mississippi A&M	2	–	3	–	1	4	–	4	–	1
Tulane	3	–	4	–	0	4	–	6	–	0
Alabama	2	–	4	–	2	5	–	4	–	2
Oglethorpe	2	–	4	–	0	5	–	4	–	0
Chattanooga	2	–	4	–	0	4	–	6	–	0
The Citadel	1	–	2	–	1	3	–	3	–	2
Kentucky	1	–	3	–	1	4	–	3	–	1
Ole Miss	1	–	4	–	0	3	–	6	–	0
Howard (AL)	1	–	4	–	0	3	–	6	–	0
Mercer	1	–	5	–	0	3	–	6	–	0
Louisville	0	–	1	–	0	2	–	2	–	1
Wofford	0	–	2	–	0	2	–	7	–	0
Georgetown (KY)	0	–	3	–	0	2	–	6	–	0
Millsaps	0	–	3	–	0	1	–	5	–	1
Clemson	0	–	5	–	2	1	–	6	–	2
+ – Conference co-champions

The 1921 Mississippi A&M Aggies football team was an American football team that represented the Agricultural and Mechanical College of the State of Mississippi (now known as Mississippi State University) as a member of the Southern Intercollegiate Athletic Association (SIAA) during the 1921 college football season. In their second season under head coach Ferdinand Holtkamp, Mississippi A&M compiled a 4–4–1 record.

== Schedule ==
Date	Opponent	Site	Result	Source
September 30	Birmingham–Southern*	Scott Field; Starkville, MS	W 20–7	
October 7	Ouachita Baptist*	Scott Field; Starkville, MS	W 21–6	
October 15	vs. Mississippi College	State Fairgrounds; Jackson, MS	W 14–13	
October 22	at Tulane	Tulane Stadium; New Orleans, LA	L 0–7	
October 29	vs. Ole Miss	Greenwood, MS (rivalry)	W 21–0	
November 5	vs. Tennessee	Hodges Field; Memphis, TN	L 7–14	
November 11	at Texas*	Clark Field; Austin, TX	L 7–54	
November 24	at Alabama	Rickwood Field; Birmingham, AL	T 7–7	
December 3	LSU	Scott Field; Starkville, MS (rivalry)	L 14–17	
*Non-conference game
