= 1921 Southern Intercollegiate Athletic Association football season =

- League: NCAA
- Sport: College football
- Duration: September 23, 1921 through January 2, 1922
- Teams: 27

Regular Season
- Season champions: Georgia Tech; Georgia; Vanderbilt

Football seasons
- ← 1920 1922 →

1921 Southern Intercollegiate Athletic Association football standings
	Conf.					Overall
Team	W		L		T	W		L		T
Centre +	5	–	0	–	0	10	–	1	–	0
Georgia +	6	–	0	–	1	7	–	2	–	1
Georgia Tech +	5	–	0	–	0	8	–	1	–	0
Vanderbilt +	5	–	0	–	1	7	–	0	–	1
Tennessee	4	–	1	–	1	6	–	2	–	1
Florida	4	–	1	–	2	6	–	3	–	2
Mississippi College	3	–	1	–	1	7	–	2	–	1
Sewanee	4	–	2	–	0	6	–	2	–	0
Transylvania	2	–	1	–	0	4	–	4	–	0
LSU	2	–	1	–	1	6	–	1	–	1
South Carolina	2	–	1	–	1	5	–	1	–	2
Furman	4	–	2	–	1	7	–	2	–	1
Auburn	3	–	2	–	0	5	–	3	–	0
Mississippi A&M	2	–	3	–	1	4	–	4	–	1
Tulane	3	–	4	–	0	4	–	6	–	0
Alabama	2	–	4	–	2	5	–	4	–	2
Oglethorpe	2	–	4	–	0	5	–	4	–	0
Chattanooga	2	–	4	–	0	4	–	6	–	0
The Citadel	1	–	2	–	1	3	–	3	–	2
Kentucky	1	–	3	–	1	4	–	3	–	1
Ole Miss	1	–	4	–	0	3	–	6	–	0
Howard (AL)	1	–	4	–	0	3	–	6	–	0
Mercer	1	–	5	–	0	3	–	6	–	0
Louisville	0	–	1	–	0	2	–	2	–	1
Wofford	0	–	2	–	0	2	–	7	–	0
Georgetown (KY)	0	–	3	–	0	2	–	6	–	0
Millsaps	0	–	3	–	0	1	–	5	–	1
Clemson	0	–	5	–	2	1	–	6	–	2
+ – Conference co-champions

The 1921 Southern Intercollegiate Athletic Association football season was the college football games played by the member schools of the Southern Intercollegiate Athletic Association as part of the 1921 college football season.

The season began on September 23 with conference member Chattanooga visiting Athens. Conference play began on September 24 with Alabama defeating Howard.

Centre, Georgia Tech, Georgia, and Vanderbilt can all claim Southern championships. Centre and Georgia Tech both posted unblemished conference records. Georgia and Vanderbilt tied each other in their contest deciding a champion.

This is the last year before many major programs move to the Southern Conference.

== Regular season ==
Index to colors and formatting
Non-conference matchup; SIAA member won
Non-conference matchup; SIAA member lost
Non-conference matchup; tie
Conference matchup

SIAA teams in bold.

=== Week One ===
Date	Visiting team	Home team	Site	Result	Attendance	Reference
September 23	**Chattanooga**	Athens	Athens, Tennessee	**W** 20–0		
September 24	**Howard**	**Alabama**	Denny Field • Tuscaloosa, Alabama	**ALA** 34–13		
September 24	Wake Forest	**Georgia Tech**	Grant Field • Atlanta	**W** 42–0		
September 24	Emory & Henry	**Tennessee**	Shields–Watkins Field • Knoxville, Tennessee	**W** 27–0		
September 24	Erskine	**Furman**	Manly Field • Greenville, South Carolina	**W** 42–7		

=== Week Two ===
Date	Visiting team	Home team	Site	Result	Attendance	Reference
September 30	**Chattanooga**	Bryson	Fayetteville, Tennessee	**W** 53–0		
October 1	Erskine	**South Carolina**	Columbia, South Carolina	**W** 13–7		
October 1	Spring Hill	**Alabama**	Denny Field • Tuscaloosa, Alabama	**W** 27–7		
October 1	**Auburn**	**Howard**	Rickwood Field • Birmingham, Alabama	**AUB** 35–3		
October 1	**Clemson**	Centre	Cheek Field • Danville, Kentucky	**L** 14–0		
October 1	**Mercer**	**Georgia**	Sanford Field • Athens, Georgia	**UGA** 28–0		
October 1	Newberry	**Furman**	Manly Field • Greenville, South Carolina	**W** 63–0		
October 1	Kentucky Wesleyan	**Kentucky**	Stoll Field • Lexington, Kentucky	**W** 68–0		
October 1	**Mississippi College**	**Tulane**	Second Tulane Stadium • New Orleans	**MSCOLL** 41–3		
October 1	Birmingham–Southern	**Mississippi A&M**	Scott Field • Starkville, Mississippi	**W** 59–13		
October 1	Memphis	**Mississippi**	Hemingway Stadium • Oxford, Mississippi	**W** 82–0		
October 1	Cumberland	**Sewanee**	McGee Field • Sewanee, Tennessee	**W** 26–0		
October 1	Middle Tennessee State	**Vanderbilt**	Dudley Field • Nashville, Tennessee	**W** 34–0		
October 1	**Florida**	Fort Benning	• Columbus, Georgia	**W** 6–0		
October 1	**Erskine**	**Presbyterian**	• Clinton, South Carolina	**L** 7–19		
October 1	**Tennessee**	Maryville	Maryville, Tennessee	**W** 7–0		
October 1	North Georgia	**Wofford**	Spartanburg, South Carolina	**W** 22–0		

=== Week Three ===
Date	Visiting team	Home team	Site	Result	Attendance	Reference
October 7	**Presbyterian**	**Clemson**	Riggs Field • Calhoun, South Carolina	**CLEM** 34–0		
October 8	Marion	**Alabama**	Denny Field • Tuscaloosa, Alabama	**W** 55–0		
October 8	Newberry	**South Carolina**	Columbia, South Carolina	**W** 7–0		
October 8	Spring Hill	**Auburn**	Montgomery, Alabama	**W** 49–28		
October 8	**Wofford**	**The Citadel**	College Park Stadium • Charleston, South Carolina	**CIT** 28–0		
October 8	**Furman**	**Georgia**	Sanford Field • Athens, Georgia	**UGA** 27–7		
October 8	Davidson	**Georgia Tech**	Grant Field • Atlanta	**W** 70–0		
October 8	Marshall	**Kentucky**	Stoll Field • Lexington, Kentucky	**W** 28–0		
October 8	**Millsaps**	Birmingham–Southern	• Birmingham, Alabama	**T** 7–7		
October 8	**Ole Miss**	**Tulane**	Second Tulane Stadium • New Orleans	**TUL** 26–0		
October 8	Jacksonville State	**Howard**		**W** 39–7		
October 8	Northwestern St.	**LSU**	State Field • Baton Rouge, Louisiana	**W** 78–0		
October 8	Louisiana College	**Mississippi College**	Clinton, Mississippi	**W** 68–0		
October 8	Ouachita	**Mississippi A&M**	Starkville, Mississippi	**W** 21–6		
October 8	**Oglethorpe**	Fort Benning	Columbus, Georgia	**W** 20–12		
October 8	Bryson	**Sewanee**	McGee Field • Sewanee, Tennessee	**W** 102–0		
October 8	**Chattanooga**	**Tennessee**	Shields–Watkins Field • Knoxville, Tennessee	**TENN** 21–0		
October 8	**Oglethorpe**	**Georgia Tech**	Grant Field • Atlanta	**GT** 41–0		
October 8	**Mercer**	**Vanderbilt**	Dudley Field • Nashville, Tennessee	**VAN** 42–0		
October 8	Rollins	**Florida**	Orlando, Florida	**W** 33–0		
October 10	Carlstrom Field	**Florida**	Fleming Field • Gainesville, Florida	**L** 19–0		

=== Week Four ===
Date	Visiting team	Home team	Site	Result	Attendance	Reference
October 14	**Clemson**	**Auburn**	Drake Field • Auburn, Alabama	**AUB** 56–0		
October 15	Bryson	**Alabama**	Denny Field • Tuscaloosa, Alabama	**W** 95–0		
October 15	**The Citadel**	**Presbyterian**	• Clinton, South Carolina	**CIT** 20–0		
October 15	**Furman**	**Georgia Tech**	Grant Field • Atlanta	**GT** 69–0		
October 15	**Tennessee**	Dartmouth	Alumni Oval • Hanover, New Hampshire	**L** 14–3		
October 15	**Georgia**	Harvard	Harvard Stadium • Boston, Massachusetts	**L** 10–7		
October 15	Texas A&M	**LSU**	State Field • Baton Rouge, Louisiana	**W** 6–0		
October 15	**Vanderbilt**	**Kentucky**	Stoll Field • Lexington, Kentucky	**VAN** 21–14	5,000	
October 15	**Mississippi A&M**	**Mississippi College**	Clinton, Mississippi	**MSA&M** 14–13		
October 15	**Millsaps**	**Ole Miss**	Hemingway Stadium • Oxford, Mississippi	**MISS** 49–0		
October 15	**Oglethorpe**	**Sewanee**	McGee Field • Sewanee, Tennessee	**SEW** 21–0		
October 15	**Tulane**	Rice	Rice Field • Houston	**W** 7–6		
October 15	**Mercer**	**Florida**	Fleming Field • Gainesville, Florida	**FLA** 7–0		
October 15	**Georgetown**	**Chattanooga**	Chamberlain Field • Chattanooga, Tennessee	**CHATT** 31–0		
October 15	Elon	**Wofford**	Spartanburg, South Carolina	**W** 20–7		
October 15	North Carolina	**South Carolina**	Columbia, South Carolina	**T** 7-7		

=== Week Five ===
Date	Visiting team	Home team	Site	Result	Attendance	Reference
October 21	**Clemson**	**Furman**	Manly Field • Greenville, South Carolina	**T** 0–0		
October 21	**Vanderbilt**	Texas	Fair Park Stadium • Dallas	**W** 20–0	15,000	
October 22	Fort Benning	**Auburn**	Drake Field • Auburn, Alabama	**W** 14–7		
October 22	**Sewanee**	**Alabama**	Rickwood Field • Birmingham, Alabama	**SEW** 17–0		
October 22	Centre	**Transylvania**	Lexington, Kentucky	**L** 98–0		
October 22	**Howard**	**Chattanooga**	Chamberlain Field • Chattanooga, Tennessee	**CHATT** 26–3		
October 22	**Oglethorpe**	**Georgia**	Sanford Field • Athens, Georgia	**UGA** 14–0		
October 22	Rutgers	**Georgia Tech**	Grant Field • Atlanta	**W** 48–14		
October 22	**Georgetown**	**Kentucky**	Stoll Field • Lexington, Kentucky	**UK** 33–0		
October 22	Hanover	**Louisville**	Louisville, Kentucky	**W** 19-8		
October 22	Presbyterian	**South Carolina**	Columbia, South Carolina	**W** 48-0		
October 22	Spring Hill	**LSU**	State Field • Baton Rouge, Louisiana	**W** 41–0		
October 22	Birmingham–Southern	**Mercer**	Macon, Georgia	**W** 20–0		
October 22	Rhodes	**Ole Miss**	Hemingway Stadium • Oxford, Mississippi	**W** 35–0		
October 22	Union (TN)	**Mississippi College**	Clinton, Mississippi	**W** 35–0		
October 22	**Florida**	**Tennessee**	Shields–Watkins Field • Knoxville, Tennessee	**TENN** 9–0		
October 22	**Mississippi A&M**	**Tulane**	Second Tulane Stadium • New Orleans, Louisiana	**TUL** 7–0		
October 22	**Presbyterian**	**South Carolina**	Columbia, South Carolina	**SCAR** 48–0		
October 22	**Wofford**	Davidson	Davidson, North Carolina	**L** 87–0		

=== Week Six ===
Date	Visiting team	Home team	Site	Result	Attendance	Reference
October 27	**Clemson**	**South Carolina**	Columbia, South Carolina	**SCAR** 21–0		
October 29	**Alabama**	**LSU**	Heinemann Park • New Orleans	**T** 7–7		
October 29	**Florida**	**Howard**	Montgomery, Alabama	**FLA** 34–0		
October 29	**Tennessee**	**Vanderbilt**	Dudley Field • Nashville, Tennessee	**VAN** 14–0		
October 29	**Auburn**	**Georgia**	McClung Stadium • Columbus, Georgia	**UGA** 7–0		
October 29	Erskine	**Presbyterian**	Clinton, South Carolina	**L** 19–7		
October 29	**The Citadel**	**Furman**	Manly Field • Greenville, South Carolina	**FUR** 42–0		
October 29	**Chattanooga**	**Oglethorpe**	Brookhaven, Georgia	**OGLE** 7–0		
October 29	**Georgia Tech**	Penn State	New York	**L** 28–7		
October 29	**Sewanee**	**Kentucky**	Louisville, Kentucky	**SEW** 6–0		
October 29	**Tulane**	Detroit Mercy	Detroit, Michigan	**L** 14–0		
October 29	**Louisville**	Bethel (KY)	Russellville, Kentucky	**T** 0-0		
October 29	Stetson	**Mercer**	Macon, Georgia	**W** 41–0		
October 29	Newberry	**Wofford**	Spartanburg, South Carolina	**L** 33–21		

=== Week Seven ===
Date	Visiting team	Home team	Site	Result	Attendance	Reference
November 3	Erskine	**Wofford**	Spartanburg, South Carolina	**L** 19–6		
November 5	**Auburn**	**Tulane**	Second Tulane Stadium • New Orleans	**AUB** 14–0		
November 5	**Howard**	Birmingham–Southern	Birmingham, Alabama	**L** 16–14		
November 5	**Kentucky**	Centre	Cheek Field • Danville, Kentucky	**L** 55–0		
November 5	**Louisville**	**Transylvania**	Lexington, Kentucky	**TRAN** 7–0		
November 5	**Mercer**	**Furman**	Manly Field • Greenville, South Carolina	**FUR** 37–0		
November 5	**Clemson**	**Georgia Tech**	Grant Field • Atlanta	**GT** 48–7		
November 5	**Mississippi College**	**Ole Miss**	Vicksburg, Mississippi	**MSCOLL** 27–7		
November 5	**Vanderbilt**	**Alabama**	Rickwood Field • Birmingham, Alabama	**VAN** 14–0		
November 5	**Sewanee**	**Chattanooga**	Chamberlain Field • Chattanooga, Tennessee	**SEW** 47–0		
November 5	**South Carolina**	**Florida**	Plant Field • Tampa, Florida	**T** 7–7		
November 5	**Mississippi A&M**	**Tennessee**	Memphis, Tennessee	**TENN** 14–7		
November 5	Stetson	**Oglethorpe**	Brookhaven, Georgia	**W** 41–0		
November 6	Virginia	**Georgia**	Sanford Field • Athens, Georgia	**W** 21–0		

=== Week Eight ===
Date	Visiting team	Home team	Site	Result	Attendance	Reference
November 10	**Clemson**	**The Citadel**	Orangeburg, South Carolina	**T** 7–7		
November 11	**Chattanooga**	Birmingham–Southern	Birmingham, Alabama	**L** 14–7		
November 11	**Florida**	**Alabama**	Denny Field • Tuscaloosa, Alabama	**FLA** 9–2	5,000	
November 11	**Mississippi A&M**	Texas	Clark Field • Austin, Texas	**L** 54–7		
November 11	**Transylvania**	Franklin (Ind.)	Franklin, Indiana	**L** 35–0		
November 12	Centre	**Auburn**	Rickwood Field • Birmingham, Alabama	**L** 21–0		
November 12	Spring Hill	**Howard**	Homewood, Alabama	**L** 7–0		
November 12	**South Carolina**	**Furman**	Manly Field • Greenville, South Carolina	**FUR** 7–0		
November 12	Georgetown	**Georgia Tech**	Grant Field • Atlanta	**W** 21–0		
November 12	**Ole Miss**	**LSU**	State Field • Baton Rouge, Louisiana	**LSU** 21–0		
November 12	VMI	**Kentucky**	Louisville, Kentucky	**W** 14–7		
November 12	**Millsaps**	**Mississippi College**	Clinton, Mississippi	**MSCOLL** 56–0		
November 12	**Oglethorpe**	**Mercer**	Macon, Georgia	**OGLE** 7–6		
November 12	**Wofford**	**Presbyterian**	Clinton, South Carolina	**PRES** 27–0		
November 12	**Sewanee**	**Tennessee**	Shields–Watkins Field • Knoxville, Tennessee	**TENN** 21–0		
November 13	**Georgia**	**Vanderbilt**	Dudley Field • Nashville, Tennessee	**T** 7–7		

=== Week Nine ===
Date	Visiting team	Home team	Site	Result	Attendance	Reference
November 18	Erskine	**Clemson**	Riggs Field • Calhoun, South Carolina	**L** 13–0		
November 18	**Mississippi College**	**Florida**	Fleming Field • Gainesville, Florida	**T** 7–7		
November 18	Kentucky Wesleyan	**Louisville**	Louisville, Kentucky	**W** 30–0		
November 19	**Wofford**	**Furman**	Manly Field • Greenville, South Carolina	**FUR** 62–0		
November 19	**Alabama**	**Georgia**	Atlanta	**UGA** 22–0		
November 19	**Chattanooga**	**Mercer**	Macon, Georgia	**MERC** 18–0		
November 19	**Presbyterian**	Newberry	Newberry, South Carolina	**L** 16–7		
November 19	**Howard**	Marion	Marion, Alabama	**W** 21–0		
November 19	**The Citadel**	**South Carolina**	Columbia, South Carolina	**SCAR** 13–0		
November 19	**LSU**	**Tulane**	Second Tulane Stadium • New Orleans	**TUL** 21–0		

=== Week Ten ===
Date	Visiting team	Home team	Site	Result	Attendance	Reference
November 24	Centre	**Tulane**	Second Tulane Stadium • New Orleans	**L** 21–0		
November 24	**Mississippi A&M**	**Alabama**	Rickwood Field • Birmingham, Alabama	**T** 7–7		
November 24	**The Citadel**	**South Carolina**	Columbia, South Carolina	**SC** 13-0		
November 24	**Auburn**	**Georgia Tech**	Grant Field • Atlanta	**GT** 14–0		
November 24	**Mississippi A&M**	**Alabama**	Rickwood Field • Birmingham, Alabama	**T** 7–7		
November 24	Davidson	**Furman**	Manly Field • Greenville, South Carolina	**W** 28–0		
November 24	**Chattanooga**	Maryville	Maryville, Tennessee	**L** 34–0		
November 24	**Howard**	**Millsaps**	Jackson, Mississippi	**HOW** 45–0		
November 24	**Kentucky**	**Tennessee**	Shields–Watkins Field • Knoxville, Tennessee	**T** 0–0		
November 24	**Sewanee**	**Vanderbilt**	Dudley Field • Nashville, Tennessee	**VAN** 9–0		
November 25	**Clemson**	**Georgia**	Sanford Field • Athens, Georgia	**UGA** 28–0		
November 25	Duke	**Wofford**	Spartanburg, South Carolina	**L** 68–0		
November 25	**Translyvania**	**Georgetown**	Georgetown, Kentucky	**TRANS** 14–6		
November 26	**Mississippi College**	Spring Hill	Mobile, Alabama	**W** 28–7		
November 26	**Louisville**	Marshall	Huntington, West Virginia	**L** 13–0		
November 27	Dartmouth	**Georgia**	Atlanta	**L** 7–0		

=== Week Eleven ===
Date	Visiting team	Home team	Site	Result	Attendance	Reference
December 3	**Alabama**	**Tulane**	Second Tulane Stadium • New Orleans	**TUL** 14–7		
December 3	**LSU**	**Mississippi A&M**	Scott Field • Starkville, Mississippi	**LSU** 17–14		
December 3	North Carolina	**Florida**	Jacksonville, Florida	**L** 14–10		
December 3	**Mississippi College**	Baylor	Dallas, Texas	**L** 24–0		

== Bowl games ==
Date	Bowl Game	Site	SIAA Team	Opponent	Score	Reference
December 26, 1921	East-West Christmas Classic	San Diego, California	Centre	Arizona	CEN 38–0	
January 2, 1922	Dixie Classic	Fair Park Stadium • Dallas	Centre	Texas A&M	TXA&M 22–14	

== Awards and honors ==
=== All-Americans ===
- E – Red Roberts, Centre (WC-1; FW-2 [g]; JV-3; MM-2)
- E – Owen Reynolds, Georgia (FW-3)
- G – Puss Whelchel, Georgia (WC-3)
- QB – Bo McMillin, Centre (FW-1; WC-2; LP-1 [hb]; BE-2; JV-2; MM-1; NB-1)
- HB – Red Barron, Georgia Tech (JV-3)
- FB – Judy Harlan, Georgia Tech (WC-3; FW-3)

=== All-Southern team ===
The following includes the composite All-Southern eleven awarded gold badges and formed by 30 sports writers culled by the Atlanta Constitution and Atlanta Journal.

Position	Name	First-team selectors	Team
QB	Bo McMillin	C	Centre
HB	Red Barron	C	Georgia Tech
HB	Goat Hale	C	Mississippi College
FB	Judy Harlan	C	Georgia Tech
E	Owen Reynolds	C	Georgia
T	Artie Pew	C	Georgia
G	Puss Whelchel	C	Georgia
C	Bum Day	C	Georgia
G	Noah Caton	C	Auburn
T	Albert Staton	C	Georgia Tech
E	Red Roberts	C	Centre

== See also ==
- 1921 Centre vs. Harvard football game
