= 1921 South Carolina Gamecocks football team =

American college football season

1921 South Carolina Gamecocks football
- Conference: Southern Intercollegiate Athletic Association
- Record: 5–1–2 (2–1–1 SIAA)
- Head coach: Sol Metzger (2nd season)
- Captain: Tatum Gressette
- Home stadium: University Field

1921 Southern Intercollegiate Athletic Association football standings
	Conf.					Overall
Team	W		L		T	W		L		T
Centre +	5	–	0	–	0	10	–	1	–	0
Georgia +	6	–	0	–	1	7	–	2	–	1
Georgia Tech +	5	–	0	–	0	8	–	1	–	0
Vanderbilt +	5	–	0	–	1	7	–	0	–	1
Tennessee	4	–	1	–	1	6	–	2	–	1
Florida	4	–	1	–	2	6	–	3	–	2
Mississippi College	3	–	1	–	1	7	–	2	–	1
Sewanee	4	–	2	–	0	6	–	2	–	0
Transylvania	2	–	1	–	0	4	–	4	–	0
LSU	2	–	1	–	1	6	–	1	–	1
South Carolina	2	–	1	–	1	5	–	1	–	2
Furman	4	–	2	–	1	7	–	2	–	1
Auburn	3	–	2	–	0	5	–	3	–	0
Mississippi A&M	2	–	3	–	1	4	–	4	–	1
Tulane	3	–	4	–	0	4	–	6	–	0
Alabama	2	–	4	–	2	5	–	4	–	2
Oglethorpe	2	–	4	–	0	5	–	4	–	0
Chattanooga	2	–	4	–	0	4	–	6	–	0
The Citadel	1	–	2	–	1	3	–	3	–	2
Kentucky	1	–	3	–	1	4	–	3	–	1
Ole Miss	1	–	4	–	0	3	–	6	–	0
Howard (AL)	1	–	4	–	0	3	–	6	–	0
Mercer	1	–	5	–	0	3	–	6	–	0
Louisville	0	–	1	–	0	2	–	2	–	1
Wofford	0	–	2	–	0	2	–	7	–	0
Georgetown (KY)	0	–	3	–	0	2	–	6	–	0
Millsaps	0	–	3	–	0	1	–	5	–	1
Clemson	0	–	5	–	2	1	–	6	–	2
+ – Conference co-champions

The 1921 South Carolina Gamecocks football team represented the University of South Carolina during the 1921 Southern Intercollegiate Athletic Association football season. Led by second-year head coach Sol Metzger, the Gamecocks compiled an overall record of record of 5–1–2 with a mark of 2–1–1 in SIAA play.

== Schedule ==
Date	Opponent	Site	Result	Source
October 1	Erskine*	University Field; Columbia, SC	W 13–7	
October 8	Newberry*	University Field; Columbia, SC	W 7–0	
October 15	North Carolina*	University Field; Columbia, SC (rivalry)	T 7–7	
October 22	Presbyterian*	University Field; Columbia, SC	W 48–0	
October 27	Clemson	State Fairgrounds; Columbia, SC (rivalry)	W 21–0	
November 5	at Florida	Plant Field; Tampa, FL	T 7–7	
November 12	at Furman	Manly Field; Greenville, SC	L 0–7	
November 24	The Citadel	University Field; Columbia, SC	W 13–0	
*Non-conference game
