= 1921 Millsaps Majors football team =

American college football season

1921 Millsaps Majors football
- Conference: Southern Intercollegiate Athletic Association
- Record: 1–5–1 (0–3 SIAA)
- Head coach: Ewing Y. Freeland (1st season)

1921 Southern Intercollegiate Athletic Association football standings
| | Conf. | | | | | Overall |
| Team | W | | L | | T | W | | L | | T |
|---|---|---|---|---|---|---|---|---|---|---|
| Centre + | 5 | – | 0 | – | 0 | 10 | – | 1 | – | 0 |
| Georgia + | 6 | – | 0 | – | 1 | 7 | – | 2 | – | 1 |
| Georgia Tech + | 5 | – | 0 | – | 0 | 8 | – | 1 | – | 0 |
| Vanderbilt + | 5 | – | 0 | – | 1 | 7 | – | 0 | – | 1 |
| Tennessee | 4 | – | 1 | – | 1 | 6 | – | 2 | – | 1 |
| Florida | 4 | – | 1 | – | 2 | 6 | – | 3 | – | 2 |
| Mississippi College | 3 | – | 1 | – | 1 | 7 | – | 2 | – | 1 |
| Sewanee | 4 | – | 2 | – | 0 | 6 | – | 2 | – | 0 |
| Transylvania | 2 | – | 1 | – | 0 | 4 | – | 4 | – | 0 |
| LSU | 2 | – | 1 | – | 1 | 6 | – | 1 | – | 1 |
| South Carolina | 2 | – | 1 | – | 1 | 5 | – | 1 | – | 2 |
| Furman | 4 | – | 2 | – | 1 | 7 | – | 2 | – | 1 |
| Auburn | 3 | – | 2 | – | 0 | 5 | – | 3 | – | 0 |
| Mississippi A&M | 2 | – | 3 | – | 1 | 4 | – | 4 | – | 1 |
| Tulane | 3 | – | 4 | – | 0 | 4 | – | 6 | – | 0 |
| Alabama | 2 | – | 4 | – | 2 | 5 | – | 4 | – | 2 |
| Oglethorpe | 2 | – | 4 | – | 0 | 5 | – | 4 | – | 0 |
| Chattanooga | 2 | – | 4 | – | 0 | 4 | – | 6 | – | 0 |
| The Citadel | 1 | – | 2 | – | 1 | 3 | – | 3 | – | 2 |
| Kentucky | 1 | – | 3 | – | 1 | 4 | – | 3 | – | 1 |
| Ole Miss | 1 | – | 4 | – | 0 | 3 | – | 6 | – | 0 |
| Howard (AL) | 1 | – | 4 | – | 0 | 3 | – | 6 | – | 0 |
| Mercer | 1 | – | 5 | – | 0 | 3 | – | 6 | – | 0 |
| Louisville | 0 | – | 1 | – | 0 | 2 | – | 2 | – | 1 |
| Wofford | 0 | – | 2 | – | 0 | 2 | – | 7 | – | 0 |
| Georgetown (KY) | 0 | – | 3 | – | 0 | 2 | – | 6 | – | 0 |
| Millsaps | 0 | – | 3 | – | 0 | 1 | – | 5 | – | 1 |
| Clemson | 0 | – | 5 | – | 2 | 1 | – | 6 | – | 2 |
+ – Conference co-champions

The 1921 Millsaps Majors football team was an American football team that represented Millsaps College the Southern Intercollegiate Athletic Association (SIAA) in the 1921 college football season. Led by Ewing Y. Freeland in his first and only season as head coach, the team compiled an overall record of 1–5–1 with a mark of 0–3 in SIAA play.

== Schedule ==
| Date | Time | Opponent | Site | Result | Source |
|---|---|---|---|---|---|
| October 8 | | at Howard (AL) | Rickwood Field; Birmingham, AL | L 0–45 | |
| October 15 | | at Ole Miss | Hemingway Stadium; Oxford, MS | L 7–6 | |
| October 21 | | Mississippi Normal* | Athletic Park; Jackson, MS | W 27–0 | |
| November 4 | | Birmingham–Southern* | State Fairgrounds; Jackson, MS | T 7–7 | |
| November 12 | | vs. Mississippi College | State Fairgrounds; Jackson, MS (rivalry) | L 0–56 | |
| November 19 | 3:30 p.m. | at Centenary* | Gasser Park; Shreveport, LA | L 7–21 | |
| November 24 | | Tennessee Docs* | State Fairgrounds; Jackson, MS | L 0–14 | |
*Non-conference game; All times are in Central time
