= 1921 Chattanooga Moccasins football team =

American college football season

1921 Chattanooga Moccasins football
- Conference: Southern Intercollegiate Athletic Association
- Record: 4–6 (2–4 SIAA)
- Head coach: Silas Williams (3rd season)
- Captain: Corbett Owens
- Home stadium: Chamberlain Field

1921 Southern Intercollegiate Athletic Association football standings
	Conf.					Overall
Team	W		L		T	W		L		T
Centre +	5	–	0	–	0	10	–	1	–	0
Georgia +	6	–	0	–	1	7	–	2	–	1
Georgia Tech +	5	–	0	–	0	8	–	1	–	0
Vanderbilt +	5	–	0	–	1	7	–	0	–	1
Tennessee	4	–	1	–	1	6	–	2	–	1
Florida	4	–	1	–	2	6	–	3	–	2
Mississippi College	3	–	1	–	1	7	–	2	–	1
Sewanee	4	–	2	–	0	6	–	2	–	0
Transylvania	2	–	1	–	0	4	–	4	–	0
LSU	2	–	1	–	1	6	–	1	–	1
South Carolina	2	–	1	–	1	5	–	1	–	2
Furman	4	–	2	–	1	7	–	2	–	1
Auburn	3	–	2	–	0	5	–	3	–	0
Mississippi A&M	2	–	3	–	1	4	–	4	–	1
Tulane	3	–	4	–	0	4	–	6	–	0
Alabama	2	–	4	–	2	5	–	4	–	2
Oglethorpe	2	–	4	–	0	5	–	4	–	0
Chattanooga	2	–	4	–	0	4	–	6	–	0
The Citadel	1	–	2	–	1	3	–	3	–	2
Kentucky	1	–	3	–	1	4	–	3	–	1
Ole Miss	1	–	4	–	0	3	–	6	–	0
Howard (AL)	1	–	4	–	0	3	–	6	–	0
Mercer	1	–	5	–	0	3	–	6	–	0
Louisville	0	–	1	–	0	2	–	2	–	1
Wofford	0	–	2	–	0	2	–	7	–	0
Georgetown (KY)	0	–	3	–	0	2	–	6	–	0
Millsaps	0	–	3	–	0	1	–	5	–	1
Clemson	0	–	5	–	2	1	–	6	–	2
+ – Conference co-champions

The 1921 Chattanooga Moccasins football team represented the University of Chattanooga (now known as the University of Tennessee at Chattanooga) as a member of the Southern Intercollegiate Athletic Association during the 1921 college football season. In their third season under head coach Silas Williams, the Moccasins completed its 10-game schedule with a record of 4 wins and 6 losses.

== Schedule ==
Date	Opponent	Site	Result	Source
September 23	at Athens*	Athens, TN	W 20–0	
September 30	Bryson College*	Chamberlain Field; Chattanooga, TN	W 53–0	
October 8	at Tennessee	Shields–Watkins Field; Knoxville, TN	L 0–21	
October 15	Georgetown (KY)	Chamberlain Field; Chattanooga, TN	W 31–0	
October 24	Howard (AL)	Chamberlain Field; Chattanooga, TN	W 26–3	
October 29	at Oglethorpe	Oglethorpe University Field; Atlanta, GA	L 0–7	
November 5	Sewanee	Chamberlain Field; Chattanooga, TN	L 0–47	
November 11	at Birmingham–Southern*	Rickwood Field; Birmingham, AL	L 7–14	
November 19	at Mercer	Alumni Field; Macon, GA	L 0–18	
November 24	at Maryville (TN)	Maryville, TN	L 0–34	
*Non-conference game
