= 1921 Oglethorpe Stormy Petrels football team =

American college football season

1921 Oglethorpe Stormy Petrels football
- Conference: Southern Intercollegiate Athletic Association
- Record: 5–4 (2–4 SIAA)
- Head coach: Jogger Elcock (2nd season)
- Home stadium: Hermance Stadium

1921 Southern Intercollegiate Athletic Association football standings
	Conf.					Overall
Team	W		L		T	W		L		T
Centre +	5	–	0	–	0	10	–	1	–	0
Georgia +	6	–	0	–	1	7	–	2	–	1
Georgia Tech +	5	–	0	–	0	8	–	1	–	0
Vanderbilt +	5	–	0	–	1	7	–	0	–	1
Tennessee	4	–	1	–	1	6	–	2	–	1
Florida	4	–	1	–	2	6	–	3	–	2
Mississippi College	3	–	1	–	1	7	–	2	–	1
Sewanee	4	–	2	–	0	6	–	2	–	0
Transylvania	2	–	1	–	0	4	–	4	–	0
LSU	2	–	1	–	1	6	–	1	–	1
South Carolina	2	–	1	–	1	5	–	1	–	2
Furman	4	–	2	–	1	7	–	2	–	1
Auburn	3	–	2	–	0	5	–	3	–	0
Mississippi A&M	2	–	3	–	1	4	–	4	–	1
Tulane	3	–	4	–	0	4	–	6	–	0
Alabama	2	–	4	–	2	5	–	4	–	2
Oglethorpe	2	–	4	–	0	5	–	4	–	0
Chattanooga	2	–	4	–	0	4	–	6	–	0
The Citadel	1	–	2	–	1	3	–	3	–	2
Kentucky	1	–	3	–	1	4	–	3	–	1
Ole Miss	1	–	4	–	0	3	–	6	–	0
Howard (AL)	1	–	4	–	0	3	–	6	–	0
Mercer	1	–	5	–	0	3	–	6	–	0
Louisville	0	–	1	–	0	2	–	2	–	1
Wofford	0	–	2	–	0	2	–	7	–	0
Georgetown (KY)	0	–	3	–	0	2	–	6	–	0
Millsaps	0	–	3	–	0	1	–	5	–	1
Clemson	0	–	5	–	2	1	–	6	–	2
+ – Conference co-champions

The 1921 Oglethorpe Stormy Petrels football team was an American football team that represented Oglethorpe University as a member of the Southern Intercollegiate Athletic Association (SIAA) during the 1921 college football season. In their second year under head coach Jogger Elcock, the team compiled an overall record of 5–4 with a mark of 2–4 in conference play, placing tied for 16th in the SIAA.

== Schedule ==
Date	Opponent	Site	Result	Source
September 24	North Georgia*	Hermance Stadium; North Atlanta, GA	W 39–0	
October 1	at Georgia Tech	Grant Field; Atlanta, GA	L 0–41	
October 8	at Camp Benning*	Columbus, GA	W 20–12	
October 15	at Sewanee	Hardee Field; Sewanee, TN	L 0–21	
October 22	at Georgia	Sanford Field; Athens, GA	L 0–14	
October 29	Chattanooga	Ponce de Leon Park; Atlanta, GA	W 7–0	
November 4	at Stetson*	DeLand, FL	W 41–0	
November 12	at Mercer	Alumni Field; Macon, GA	W 7–6	
November 24	at Florida	Fleming Field; Gainesville, FL	L 3–21	
*Non-conference game
