= 1921 The Citadel Bulldogs football team =

American college football season

1921 The Citadel Bulldogs football
- Conference: Southern Intercollegiate Athletic Association
- Record: 3–3–2 (1–2–1 SIAA)
- Head coach: Harry J. O'Brien (5th season)
- Home stadium: College Park Stadium

1921 Southern Intercollegiate Athletic Association football standings
	Conf.					Overall
Team	W		L		T	W		L		T
Centre +	5	–	0	–	0	10	–	1	–	0
Georgia +	6	–	0	–	1	7	–	2	–	1
Georgia Tech +	5	–	0	–	0	8	–	1	–	0
Vanderbilt +	5	–	0	–	1	7	–	0	–	1
Tennessee	4	–	1	–	1	6	–	2	–	1
Florida	4	–	1	–	2	6	–	3	–	2
Mississippi College	3	–	1	–	1	7	–	2	–	1
Sewanee	4	–	2	–	0	6	–	2	–	0
Transylvania	2	–	1	–	0	4	–	4	–	0
LSU	2	–	1	–	1	6	–	1	–	1
South Carolina	2	–	1	–	1	5	–	1	–	2
Furman	4	–	2	–	1	7	–	2	–	1
Auburn	3	–	2	–	0	5	–	3	–	0
Mississippi A&M	2	–	3	–	1	4	–	4	–	1
Tulane	3	–	4	–	0	4	–	6	–	0
Alabama	2	–	4	–	2	5	–	4	–	2
Oglethorpe	2	–	4	–	0	5	–	4	–	0
Chattanooga	2	–	4	–	0	4	–	6	–	0
The Citadel	1	–	2	–	1	3	–	3	–	2
Kentucky	1	–	3	–	1	4	–	3	–	1
Ole Miss	1	–	4	–	0	3	–	6	–	0
Howard (AL)	1	–	4	–	0	3	–	6	–	0
Mercer	1	–	5	–	0	3	–	6	–	0
Louisville	0	–	1	–	0	2	–	2	–	1
Wofford	0	–	2	–	0	2	–	7	–	0
Georgetown (KY)	0	–	3	–	0	2	–	6	–	0
Millsaps	0	–	3	–	0	1	–	5	–	1
Clemson	0	–	5	–	2	1	–	6	–	2
+ – Conference co-champions

The 1921 The Citadel Bulldogs football team represented The Citadel, The Military College of South Carolina in the 1921 college football season. Harry J. O'Brien served as head coach for the second consecutive and fifth season overall The Bulldogs played as members of the Southern Intercollegiate Athletic Association and played home games at College Park Stadium in Hampton Park.

== Schedule ==
Date	Opponent	Site	Result	Source
October 1	Parris Island Marines*	College Park Stadium; Charleston, SC	W 37–0	
October 8	Wofford	College Park Stadium; Charleston, SC	W 28–0	
October 15	at Presbyterian*	Athletic Field; Clinton, SC	W 20–0	
October 22	Erskine*	College Park Stadium; Charleston, SC	L 6–13	
October 29	at Furman	Manly Field; Greenville, SC (rivalry)	L 0–42	
November 5	Newberry*	College Park Stadium; Charleston, SC	T 7–7	
November 10	vs. Clemson	County Fairgrounds; Orangeburg, SC	T 7–7	
November 24	at South Carolina	University Field; Columbia, SC	L 0–13	
*Non-conference game
