= 1921 Howard Bulldogs football team =

American college football season

1921 Howard Bulldogs football
- Conference: Southern Intercollegiate Athletic Association
- Record: 3–6 (1–4 SIAA)
- Head coach: Robert C. Marshall (2nd season)
- Home stadium: Rickwood Field

1921 Southern Intercollegiate Athletic Association football standings
	Conf.					Overall
Team	W		L		T	W		L		T
Centre +	5	–	0	–	0	10	–	1	–	0
Georgia +	6	–	0	–	1	7	–	2	–	1
Georgia Tech +	5	–	0	–	0	8	–	1	–	0
Vanderbilt +	5	–	0	–	1	7	–	0	–	1
Tennessee	4	–	1	–	1	6	–	2	–	1
Florida	4	–	1	–	2	6	–	3	–	2
Mississippi College	3	–	1	–	1	7	–	2	–	1
Sewanee	4	–	2	–	0	6	–	2	–	0
Transylvania	2	–	1	–	0	4	–	4	–	0
LSU	2	–	1	–	1	6	–	1	–	1
South Carolina	2	–	1	–	1	5	–	1	–	2
Furman	4	–	2	–	1	7	–	2	–	1
Auburn	3	–	2	–	0	5	–	3	–	0
Mississippi A&M	2	–	3	–	1	4	–	4	–	1
Tulane	3	–	4	–	0	4	–	6	–	0
Alabama	2	–	4	–	2	5	–	4	–	2
Oglethorpe	2	–	4	–	0	5	–	4	–	0
Chattanooga	2	–	4	–	0	4	–	6	–	0
The Citadel	1	–	2	–	1	3	–	3	–	2
Kentucky	1	–	3	–	1	4	–	3	–	1
Ole Miss	1	–	4	–	0	3	–	6	–	0
Howard (AL)	1	–	4	–	0	3	–	6	–	0
Mercer	1	–	5	–	0	3	–	6	–	0
Louisville	0	–	1	–	0	2	–	2	–	1
Wofford	0	–	2	–	0	2	–	7	–	0
Georgetown (KY)	0	–	3	–	0	2	–	6	–	0
Millsaps	0	–	3	–	0	1	–	5	–	1
Clemson	0	–	5	–	2	1	–	6	–	2
+ – Conference co-champions

The 1921 Howard Bulldogs football team was an American football team that represented Howard College (now known as the Samford University) as a member of the Southern Intercollegiate Athletic Association (SIAA) during the 1921 college football season. In their second year under head coach Robert C. Marshall, the team compiled a 3–6 record.

== Schedule ==
Date	Opponent	Site	Result	Attendance	Source
September 24	at Alabama	Denny Field; Tuscaloosa, AL	L 14–34	2,000	
October 1	Auburn	Rickwood Field; Birmingham, AL	L 2–35		
October 8	Millsaps	Rickwood Field; Birmingham, AL	W 45–0		
October 14	Jacksonville State*	Eagles Field; Birmingham, AL (rivalry)	W 39–7		
October 22	at Chattanooga	Chamberlain Field; Chattanooga, TN	L 3–26		
October 29	vs. Florida	Gunter Park; Montgomery, AL	L 0–34	200	
November 5	vs. Marion*	Gunter Park; Montgomery, AL	W 21–0		
November 11	at Spring Hill*	Mobile, AL	L 0–7		
November 20	Birmingham–Southern*^{†}	Rickwood Field; Birmingham, AL	L 14–16	5,500	
*Non-conference game; ^{†}Homecoming
