= 1921 Sewanee Tigers football team =

American college football season

1921 Sewanee Tigers football
- Conference: Southern Intercollegiate Athletic Association
- Record: 6–2 (4–2 SIAA)
- Head coach: John Nicholson (1st season)
- Captain: C. D. Conway
- Home stadium: Hardee Field

1921 Southern Intercollegiate Athletic Association football standings
| | Conf. | | | | | Overall |
| Team | W | | L | | T | W | | L | | T |
|---|---|---|---|---|---|---|---|---|---|---|
| Centre + | 5 | – | 0 | – | 0 | 10 | – | 1 | – | 0 |
| Georgia + | 6 | – | 0 | – | 1 | 7 | – | 2 | – | 1 |
| Georgia Tech + | 5 | – | 0 | – | 0 | 8 | – | 1 | – | 0 |
| Vanderbilt + | 5 | – | 0 | – | 1 | 7 | – | 0 | – | 1 |
| Tennessee | 4 | – | 1 | – | 1 | 6 | – | 2 | – | 1 |
| Florida | 4 | – | 1 | – | 2 | 6 | – | 3 | – | 2 |
| Mississippi College | 3 | – | 1 | – | 1 | 7 | – | 2 | – | 1 |
| Sewanee | 4 | – | 2 | – | 0 | 6 | – | 2 | – | 0 |
| Transylvania | 2 | – | 1 | – | 0 | 4 | – | 4 | – | 0 |
| LSU | 2 | – | 1 | – | 1 | 6 | – | 1 | – | 1 |
| South Carolina | 2 | – | 1 | – | 1 | 5 | – | 1 | – | 2 |
| Furman | 4 | – | 2 | – | 1 | 7 | – | 2 | – | 1 |
| Auburn | 3 | – | 2 | – | 0 | 5 | – | 3 | – | 0 |
| Mississippi A&M | 2 | – | 3 | – | 1 | 4 | – | 4 | – | 1 |
| Tulane | 3 | – | 4 | – | 0 | 4 | – | 6 | – | 0 |
| Alabama | 2 | – | 4 | – | 2 | 5 | – | 4 | – | 2 |
| Oglethorpe | 2 | – | 4 | – | 0 | 5 | – | 4 | – | 0 |
| Chattanooga | 2 | – | 4 | – | 0 | 4 | – | 6 | – | 0 |
| The Citadel | 1 | – | 2 | – | 1 | 3 | – | 3 | – | 2 |
| Kentucky | 1 | – | 3 | – | 1 | 4 | – | 3 | – | 1 |
| Ole Miss | 1 | – | 4 | – | 0 | 3 | – | 6 | – | 0 |
| Howard (AL) | 1 | – | 4 | – | 0 | 3 | – | 6 | – | 0 |
| Mercer | 1 | – | 5 | – | 0 | 3 | – | 6 | – | 0 |
| Louisville | 0 | – | 1 | – | 0 | 2 | – | 2 | – | 1 |
| Wofford | 0 | – | 2 | – | 0 | 2 | – | 7 | – | 0 |
| Georgetown (KY) | 0 | – | 3 | – | 0 | 2 | – | 6 | – | 0 |
| Millsaps | 0 | – | 3 | – | 0 | 1 | – | 5 | – | 1 |
| Clemson | 0 | – | 5 | – | 2 | 1 | – | 6 | – | 2 |
+ – Conference co-champions

The 1921 Sewanee Tigers football team represented Sewanee: The University of the South during the 1921 college football season as a member of the Southern Intercollegiate Athletic Association (SIAA). The Tigers were led by head coach John Nicholson in his first season and finished with a record of six wins and two losses (6–2 overall, 4–2 in the SIAA).

== Schedule ==
| Date | Time | Opponent | Site | Result | Attendance | Source |
|---|---|---|---|---|---|---|
| October 1 | | Cumberland (TN)* | Hardee Field; Sewanee, TN | W 26–0 | | |
| October 8 | | Bryson College* | Hardee Field; Sewanee, TN | W 102–0 | | |
| October 15 | | Oglethorpe | Hardee Field; Sewanee, TN | W 21–0 | | |
| October 22 | | at Alabama | Rickwood Field; Birmingham, AL | W 17–0 | 7,500 | |
| October 29 | | vs. Kentucky | Eclipse Park; Louisville, KY | W 6–0 | | |
| November 5 | | at Chattanooga | Chamberlain Field; Chattanooga, TN | W 47–0 | | |
| November 12 | | at Tennessee | Shields–Watkins Field; Knoxville, TN | L 0–21 | | |
| November 24 | 2:00 p.m. | at Vanderbilt | Dudley Field; Nashville, TN (rivalry) | L 0–9 | | |
*Non-conference game
