= 1921 Mississippi College Choctaws football team =

American college football season

1921 Mississippi College Choctaws football
- Conference: Southern Intercollegiate Athletic Association
- Record: 7–2–1 (3–1–1 SIAA)
- Head coach: Stanley L. Robinson (2nd season)
- Home stadium: Provine Field

1921 Southern Intercollegiate Athletic Association football standings
	Conf.					Overall
Team	W		L		T	W		L		T
Centre +	5	–	0	–	0	10	–	1	–	0
Georgia +	6	–	0	–	1	7	–	2	–	1
Georgia Tech +	5	–	0	–	0	8	–	1	–	0
Vanderbilt +	5	–	0	–	1	7	–	0	–	1
Tennessee	4	–	1	–	1	6	–	2	–	1
Florida	4	–	1	–	2	6	–	3	–	2
Mississippi College	3	–	1	–	1	7	–	2	–	1
Sewanee	4	–	2	–	0	6	–	2	–	0
Transylvania	2	–	1	–	0	4	–	4	–	0
LSU	2	–	1	–	1	6	–	1	–	1
South Carolina	2	–	1	–	1	5	–	1	–	2
Furman	4	–	2	–	1	7	–	2	–	1
Auburn	3	–	2	–	0	5	–	3	–	0
Mississippi A&M	2	–	3	–	1	4	–	4	–	1
Tulane	3	–	4	–	0	4	–	6	–	0
Alabama	2	–	4	–	2	5	–	4	–	2
Oglethorpe	2	–	4	–	0	5	–	4	–	0
Chattanooga	2	–	4	–	0	4	–	6	–	0
The Citadel	1	–	2	–	1	3	–	3	–	2
Kentucky	1	–	3	–	1	4	–	3	–	1
Ole Miss	1	–	4	–	0	3	–	6	–	0
Howard (AL)	1	–	4	–	0	3	–	6	–	0
Mercer	1	–	5	–	0	3	–	6	–	0
Louisville	0	–	1	–	0	2	–	2	–	1
Wofford	0	–	2	–	0	2	–	7	–	0
Georgetown (KY)	0	–	3	–	0	2	–	6	–	0
Millsaps	0	–	3	–	0	1	–	5	–	1
Clemson	0	–	5	–	2	1	–	6	–	2
+ – Conference co-champions

The 1921 Mississippi College Choctaws football team represented Mississippi College as a member of the Southern Intercollegiate Athletic Association (SIAA) during the 1921 college football season. The team was led by second-year head coach Stanley L. Robinson and College Football Hall of Famer, halfback Goat Hale. "Ten other players are on Hale's teams, but they are there merely to conform with gridiron rules." Hale scored 161 points and gained 2,160 yards as he was selected All-Southern. The team's stadium is today named Robinson-Hale stadium, for coach Robinson and Goat Hale.

== Schedule ==
Date	Opponent	Site	Result	Source
October 1	at Tulane	Tulane Stadium; New Orleans, LA	W 14–0	
October 8	Louisiana College*	Provine Field; Clinton, MS	W 68–0	
October 14	vs. Mississippi A&M	State Fairgrounds; Jackson, MS	L 13–14	
October 22	Union (TN)*	Provine Field; Clinton, MS	W 35–0	
October 29	at Birmingham–Southern*	Rickwood Field; Birmingham, AL	W 27–6	
November 5	vs. Ole Miss	Vicksburg Fairgrounds; Vicksburg, MS	W 27–7	
November 11	vs. Millsaps	State Fairgrounds; Jackson, MS (Rivalry)	W 56–0	
November 18	at Florida	Fleming Field; Gainesville, FL	T 7–7	
November 24	at Spring Hill*	Monroe Park; Mobile, AL	W 28–7	
December 3	vs. Baylor*	Gardner Park; Dallas, TX	L 0–24	
*Non-conference game

- Schedule sources:

== Season summary ==
=== Tulane ===
Mississippi College at Tulane

Team	1	2	3	4	Total
• Mississippi	0	14	0	0	14
Tulane	0	0	0	0	0

- Date: October 3
- Location: New Orleans

Goat Hale nearly single-handedly defeated Tulane 14–0. Hale scored first on a 25-yard run around right end, and the second touchdown came on a run of 80 yards. Soon after, he signed a large baseball contract.

=== Louisiana College ===
In the second week of play the Choctaws beat Louisiana College 68–0.

=== Mississippi A&M ===
The season's only SIAA loss came in the third week against in-state rival Mississippi A&M by a single point, 14–13.

=== Union ===
The Union Bulldogs were defeated 35–0.

=== Birmingham–Southern ===
Mississippi College at Birmingham-Southern

Team	1	2	3	4	Total
• Mississippi	14	6	0	7	27
Birmingham	0	0	6	0	6

- Date: October 29
- Location: Birmingham

Hale scored three touchdowns in a 27–6 victory over Birmingham–Southern. The first was a 60-yard punt return. The Panthers scored in the third quarter on a 55-yard touchdown pass from Gandy to Griffin.

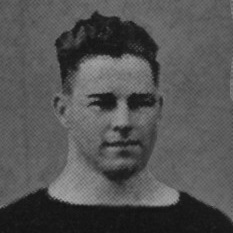
Goat Hale

The starting lineup was Simmons (left end), Hudson (left tackle), Everett (left guard), Sheffield (center), Fortenberry (right guard), Stuart (right tackle), Austin (right end), Lambright (quarterback), Hale (left halfback), Tyler (right halfback), Keith (fullback).

=== Ole Miss ===
The Choctaws defeated the Mississippi team 27–7 at a game in Vicksburg.

=== Millsaps ===
Nearby rival Millsaps was beaten 56–0.

=== Florida ===
Mississippi College at Florida

Team	1	2	3	4	Total
Mississippi	0	7	0	0	7
Florida	0	0	0	7	7

- Date: November 18
- Location: Gainesville, Florida

The Choctaws battled coach William G. Kline's Florida Gators to a 7–7 tie. Florida had the greater weight and Mississippi College the greater speed.

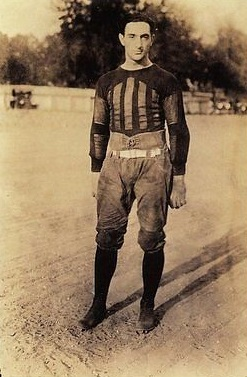
Florida's Ark Newton (pictured) had a 92-yard punt against the Choctaws.

Led by Hale, the Choctaws controlled the first half. In the middle of the fourth quarter, Florida led a comeback with a series of forward passes, scoring its touchdown. Ark Newton had a 92-yard punt in this game.

=== Spring Hill ===
On Thanksgiving Day, Mississippi College beat the Spring Hill Badgers of Mobile 28–7. Hale ran for four touchdowns. Spring Hill's Frank Bogue picked up a fumble and, with no one in front of him and most players down, raced towards the goal. Hale chased him down from behind, saving a touchdown. "It was a sensational run, and probably the fastest ever seen in Mobile."

=== Baylor ===
The final game of the season was a 24–0 loss to Baylor in Dallas.
