= 1921 LSU Tigers football team =

American college football season

1921 LSU Tigers football
- Conference: Southern Intercollegiate Athletic Association
- Record: 6–1–1 (2–1–1 SIAA)
- Head coach: Branch Bocock (2nd season)
- Captain: F. L. "Fritz" Spence
- Home stadium: State Field

1921 Southern Intercollegiate Athletic Association football standings
	Conf.					Overall
Team	W		L		T	W		L		T
Centre +	5	–	0	–	0	10	–	1	–	0
Georgia +	6	–	0	–	1	7	–	2	–	1
Georgia Tech +	5	–	0	–	0	8	–	1	–	0
Vanderbilt +	5	–	0	–	1	7	–	0	–	1
Tennessee	4	–	1	–	1	6	–	2	–	1
Florida	4	–	1	–	2	6	–	3	–	2
Mississippi College	3	–	1	–	1	7	–	2	–	1
Sewanee	4	–	2	–	0	6	–	2	–	0
Transylvania	2	–	1	–	0	4	–	4	–	0
LSU	2	–	1	–	1	6	–	1	–	1
South Carolina	2	–	1	–	1	5	–	1	–	2
Furman	4	–	2	–	1	7	–	2	–	1
Auburn	3	–	2	–	0	5	–	3	–	0
Mississippi A&M	2	–	3	–	1	4	–	4	–	1
Tulane	3	–	4	–	0	4	–	6	–	0
Alabama	2	–	4	–	2	5	–	4	–	2
Oglethorpe	2	–	4	–	0	5	–	4	–	0
Chattanooga	2	–	4	–	0	4	–	6	–	0
The Citadel	1	–	2	–	1	3	–	3	–	2
Kentucky	1	–	3	–	1	4	–	3	–	1
Ole Miss	1	–	4	–	0	3	–	6	–	0
Howard (AL)	1	–	4	–	0	3	–	6	–	0
Mercer	1	–	5	–	0	3	–	6	–	0
Louisville	0	–	1	–	0	2	–	2	–	1
Wofford	0	–	2	–	0	2	–	7	–	0
Georgetown (KY)	0	–	3	–	0	2	–	6	–	0
Millsaps	0	–	3	–	0	1	–	5	–	1
Clemson	0	–	5	–	2	1	–	6	–	2
+ – Conference co-champions

The 1921 LSU Tigers football team represented the University of Louisiana (now known as Louisiana State University or LSU) as a member of the Southern Intercollegiate Athletic Association (SIAA) during the 1921 college football season. Led by second-year head coach Branch Bocock, the Tigers compiled an overall record of 6–1–1, with a mark of 2–1–1 in conference play, finished tied for ninth in the SIAA. LSU played home games at State Field in Baton Rouge, Louisiana.

== Schedule ==
Date	Opponent	Site	Result	Attendance	Source
October 8	Louisiana Normal*	State Field; Baton Rouge, LA	W 78–0		
October 15	Texas A&M*	State Field; Baton Rouge, LA (rivalry)	W 6–0		
October 22	Spring Hill*	State Field; Baton Rouge, LA	W 41–7		
October 29	vs. Alabama	Heinemann Park; New Orleans, LA (rivalry)	T 7–7	4,000	
November 5	vs. Arkansas*	Fair Grounds; Shreveport, LA (rivalry)	W 10–7		
November 12	Ole Miss	State Field; Baton Rouge, LA (rivalry)	W 21–0		
November 19	at Tulane	Tulane Stadium; New Orleans, LA (rivalry)	L 21–0		
December 3	at Mississippi A&M	Scott Field; Starkville, MS (rivalry)	W 17–14		
*Non-conference game
