= 1921 Tulane Green Wave football team =

American college football season

1921 Tulane Green Wave football
- Conference: Southern Intercollegiate Athletic Association
- Record: 4–6 (3–3 SIAA)
- Head coach: Myron Fuller (1st season)
- Offensive scheme: Single-wing
- Captain: James Reed
- Home stadium: Second Tulane Stadium

1921 Southern Intercollegiate Athletic Association football standings
	Conf.					Overall
Team	W		L		T	W		L		T
Centre +	5	–	0	–	0	10	–	1	–	0
Georgia +	6	–	0	–	1	7	–	2	–	1
Georgia Tech +	5	–	0	–	0	8	–	1	–	0
Vanderbilt +	5	–	0	–	1	7	–	0	–	1
Tennessee	4	–	1	–	1	6	–	2	–	1
Florida	4	–	1	–	2	6	–	3	–	2
Mississippi College	3	–	1	–	1	7	–	2	–	1
Sewanee	4	–	2	–	0	6	–	2	–	0
Transylvania	2	–	1	–	0	4	–	4	–	0
LSU	2	–	1	–	1	6	–	1	–	1
South Carolina	2	–	1	–	1	5	–	1	–	2
Furman	4	–	2	–	1	7	–	2	–	1
Auburn	3	–	2	–	0	5	–	3	–	0
Mississippi A&M	2	–	3	–	1	4	–	4	–	1
Tulane	3	–	4	–	0	4	–	6	–	0
Alabama	2	–	4	–	2	5	–	4	–	2
Oglethorpe	2	–	4	–	0	5	–	4	–	0
Chattanooga	2	–	4	–	0	4	–	6	–	0
The Citadel	1	–	2	–	1	3	–	3	–	2
Kentucky	1	–	3	–	1	4	–	3	–	1
Ole Miss	1	–	4	–	0	3	–	6	–	0
Howard (AL)	1	–	4	–	0	3	–	6	–	0
Mercer	1	–	5	–	0	3	–	6	–	0
Louisville	0	–	1	–	0	2	–	2	–	1
Wofford	0	–	2	–	0	2	–	7	–	0
Georgetown (KY)	0	–	3	–	0	2	–	6	–	0
Millsaps	0	–	3	–	0	1	–	5	–	1
Clemson	0	–	5	–	2	1	–	6	–	2
+ – Conference co-champions

The 1921 Tulane Green Wave football team was an American football team that represented Tulane University as a member of the Southern Intercollegiate Athletic Association (SIAA) during the 1921 college football season. In its first year under head coach Myron Fuller, Tulane compiled a 4–6 record (3–3 in conference games), finished in 15th place in the SIAA, and was outscored by a total of 97 to 84.

== Schedule ==
Date	Time	Opponent	Site	Result	Attendance	Source
October 1		Mississippi College	Tulane Stadium; New Orleans, LA	L 0–14		
October 8		Ole Miss	Tulane Stadium; New Orleans, LA (rivalry)	W 26–0		
October 15		at Rice*	Rice Field; Houston, TX	W 7–6		
October 22		Mississippi A&M	Tulane Stadium; New Orleans, LA	W 7–0		
October 29		at Detroit*	Navin Field; Detroit, MI	L 10–14		
November 5		Auburn	Tulane Stadium; New Orleans, LA (rivalry)	L 0–14		
November 12	2:30 p.m.	at Washington University*	Francis Field; St. Louis, MO	L 6–14	4,000	
November 19		LSU	Tulane Stadium; New Orleans, LA (Battle for the Rag)	W 21–0		
November 24		Centre	Tulane Stadium; New Orleans, LA	L 0–21		
December 3		Alabama	Tulane Stadium; New Orleans, LA	L 7–14	4,000	
*Non-conference game; All times are in Central time
