= 1921 Alabama Crimson Tide football team =

American college football season

1921 Alabama Crimson Tide football
- Conference: Southern Intercollegiate Athletic Association
- Record: 5–4–2 (2–4–2 SIAA)
- Head coach: Xen C. Scott (3rd season)
- Captain: Al Clemens
- Home stadium: Denny Field; Rickwood Field

1921 Southern Intercollegiate Athletic Association football standings
	Conf.					Overall
Team	W		L		T	W		L		T
Centre +	5	–	0	–	0	10	–	1	–	0
Georgia +	6	–	0	–	1	7	–	2	–	1
Georgia Tech +	5	–	0	–	0	8	–	1	–	0
Vanderbilt +	5	–	0	–	1	7	–	0	–	1
Tennessee	4	–	1	–	1	6	–	2	–	1
Florida	4	–	1	–	2	6	–	3	–	2
Mississippi College	3	–	1	–	1	7	–	2	–	1
Sewanee	4	–	2	–	0	6	–	2	–	0
Transylvania	2	–	1	–	0	4	–	4	–	0
LSU	2	–	1	–	1	6	–	1	–	1
South Carolina	2	–	1	–	1	5	–	1	–	2
Furman	4	–	2	–	1	7	–	2	–	1
Auburn	3	–	2	–	0	5	–	3	–	0
Mississippi A&M	2	–	3	–	1	4	–	4	–	1
Tulane	3	–	4	–	0	4	–	6	–	0
Alabama	2	–	4	–	2	5	–	4	–	2
Oglethorpe	2	–	4	–	0	5	–	4	–	0
Chattanooga	2	–	4	–	0	4	–	6	–	0
The Citadel	1	–	2	–	1	3	–	3	–	2
Kentucky	1	–	3	–	1	4	–	3	–	1
Ole Miss	1	–	4	–	0	3	–	6	–	0
Howard (AL)	1	–	4	–	0	3	–	6	–	0
Mercer	1	–	5	–	0	3	–	6	–	0
Louisville	0	–	1	–	0	2	–	2	–	1
Wofford	0	–	2	–	0	2	–	7	–	0
Georgetown (KY)	0	–	3	–	0	2	–	6	–	0
Millsaps	0	–	3	–	0	1	–	5	–	1
Clemson	0	–	5	–	2	1	–	6	–	2
+ – Conference co-champions

The 1921 Alabama Crimson Tide football team (variously "Alabama", "UA" or "Bama") represented the University of Alabama in the 1921 college football season. It was the Crimson Tide's 28th overall and 25th season as a member of the Southern Intercollegiate Athletic Association (SIAA). The team was led by head coach Xen C. Scott, in his third year, and played their home games at Denny Field in Tuscaloosa and at Rickwood Field in Birmingham, Alabama. They finished the season with a record of five wins, four losses and two ties (5–4–2 overall, 2–4–2 in the SIAA).

In the opener, Alabama spotted Howard a 14–0 first-quarter lead before they rallied and won, 34–14. After a victory over Spring Hill in their second game, the Crimson Tide outscored Marion and Bryson College by a combined 150–0 over their next two games en route to a 4–0 start to open the season. The fast start did not translate to winning for the remainder of the season as they lost four of their next five games.

In their first Rickwood Field game of the season, the Crimson Tide was shut out by Sewanee and followed the loss with a tie against LSU in their first road game of the season at New Orleans. Alabama returned to Rickwood in their next game, where they were shut out by Vanderbilt, followed by losses to Florida on homecoming in Tuscaloosa and then to Georgia at Atlanta. After they tied Mississippi A&M in their final home game of the year, Alabama upset Tulane at New Orleans and prevented their first losing season since 1903.

== Schedule ==
Date	Opponent	Site	Result	Attendance	Source
September 24	Howard (AL)	Denny Field; Tuscaloosa, AL	W 34–14	2,000	
October 1	Spring Hill*	Denny Field; Tuscaloosa, AL	W 27–7		
October 8	Marion*	Denny Field; Tuscaloosa, AL	W 55–0	2,000	
October 15	Bryson College*	Denny Field; Tuscaloosa, AL	W 95–0		
October 22	Sewanee	Rickwood Field; Birmingham, AL	L 0–17	7,500	
October 29	vs. LSU	Heinemann Park; New Orleans, LA (rivalry)	T 7–7	4,000	
November 5	Vanderbilt	Rickwood Field; Birmingham, AL	L 0–14		
November 11	Florida^{†}	Denny Field; Tuscaloosa, AL (rivalry)	L 2–9	5,000	
November 19	vs. Georgia	Ponce de Leon Park; Atlanta, GA (rivalry)	L 0–22		
November 24	Mississippi A&M	Rickwood Field; Birmingham, AL (rivalry)	T 7–7		
December 3	at Tulane	Second Tulane Stadium; New Orleans, LA	W 14–7	4,000	
*Non-conference game; ^{†}Homecoming

== Game summaries ==
=== Howard (AL) ===
Howard at Alabama

Team	1	2	3	4	Total
Howard	14	0	0	0	14
• Alabama	0	13	21	0	34

- Date: September 24
- Location: Denny Field
  Tuscaloosa, AL
- Game attendance: 2,000

As they had lost several starters from the previous season, Alabama entered their season opener against Howard (now known as Samford University) with much uncertainty. Against the Bulldogs, the Crimson Tide trailed 14–0 after the first quarter, but rallied with 34 unanswered points and won 34–14. Early in the first, Howard scored both of their touchdowns on fumble returns on successive Alabama possessions; the first came on a 60-yard and second on a 30-yard return. The 14–0 deficit marked the first time Alabama ever trailed Howard at the end of the first quarter in the history of their series.

Alabama responded in the second with a pair of 25-yard touchdown runs first by Lelias Kirby and then by Max Rosenfeld that made the halftime score 14–13. The Crimson Tide then closed the game with three touchdowns in the third quarter that made the final score 34–14. Rosenfeld scored on runs of five and ten-yards and Charles Bartlett scored on a six-yard run.

=== Spring Hill ===
Spring Hill at Alabama

Team	1	2	3	4	Total
Spring Hill	0	7	0	0	7
• Alabama	0	7	7	13	27

- Date: October 1
- Location: Denny Field
  Tuscaloosa, AL

In what was their first all-time game against Spring Hill College, Alabama defeated the Badgers 27–7 at Denny Field. After a scoreless first quarter that saw the Badgers drive to the one-foot line of the Crimson Tide before a turnover on downs, each team scored a second quarter touchdown that made the halftime score 7–7. Poc Little scored first for the Crimson Tide on a five-yard run and the Badgers' Walet intercepted a Tom Newton pass and returned it 55-yards and tied the game 7–7 at halftime. Alabama then closed the game with three one-yard touchdown runs and won 27–7. The first was by L. O. Wesley in the third and by Max Rosenfeld and William C. Baty in the fourth.

=== Marion ===
Marion at Alabama

Team	1	2	3	4	Total
Marion	0	0	0	0	0
• Alabama	0	20	21	14	55

- Date: October 8
- Location: Denny Field
  Tuscaloosa, AL

Against Marion, Alabama shutout the Cadets 55–0 at Tuscaloosa for their third consecutive win to open the season. Touchdowns were scored four times by Max Rosenfeld, twice by William C. Baty and once each by Al Clemens and Virgil Hawkins.

=== Bryson College ===
Against Bryson College (merged with Erskine College in 1929), coach Scott played two separate backfields in a game for the first time. In the only game ever played between the schools, Alabama was dominant in a 95–0 victory at Tuscaloosa. Touchdowns were scored three times by Max Rosenfeld and Al Clemens, twice by William C. Baty, Poc Little and Virgil Hawkins and once each by George Baker, Lewis and W. S. "Country" Oliver. The 95 points remain the second most scored in a single game in the history of Alabama football behind a 110 performance against the Marion Military Institute to open the 1921 season.

=== Sewanee ===
Sewanee at Alabama

Team	1	2	3	4	Total
• Sewanee	3	0	7	7	17
Alabama	0	0	0	0	0

- Date: October 22
- Location: Rickwood Field
  Birmingham, AL
- Game attendance: 7,500

In the first Rickwood Field game of the season, the Sewanee Tigers shutout Alabama 17–0 for their first loss of the season. After an early Al Clemens fumble gave Sewanee good field position, Fletcher Skidmore gave the Tigers an early 3–0 lead with his 40-yard field goal in the first quarter. Both teams then played strong defense and the Tigers' maintained their slim lead into halftime. Bauman scored on a short touchdown run that capped a 70-yard drive in the third quarter and extended their lead to 10–0. William Coughlan then made the final score 17–0 with his short touchdown run in the fourth quarter.

=== LSU ===
Alabama at LSU

Team	1	2	3	4	Total
Alabama	0	0	7	0	7
LSU	0	0	0	7	7

- Date: October 29
- Location: Heinemann Park
  New Orleans, LA
- Game attendance: 4,000

After their loss to Sewanee, Alabama scrimmaged both Cullman High School and Tuscaloosa High School as part of their preparation for their first road game of the season. At Heinemann Park in New Orleans, Alabama tied LSU 7–7 after the Tigers scored a late touchdown in the fourth quarter. After a defensive struggle in the first half, Alabama scored the first points of the game in the third quarter. The touchdown came on a three-yard Hulet Whitaker run that capped a 65-yard drive. Clarence Ives then tied the game late in the fourth quarter on a short touchdown run. Although the game ended in a tie, the Crimson Tide dominated play as they made 23 first downs as compared to LSU's six.

=== Vanderbilt ===
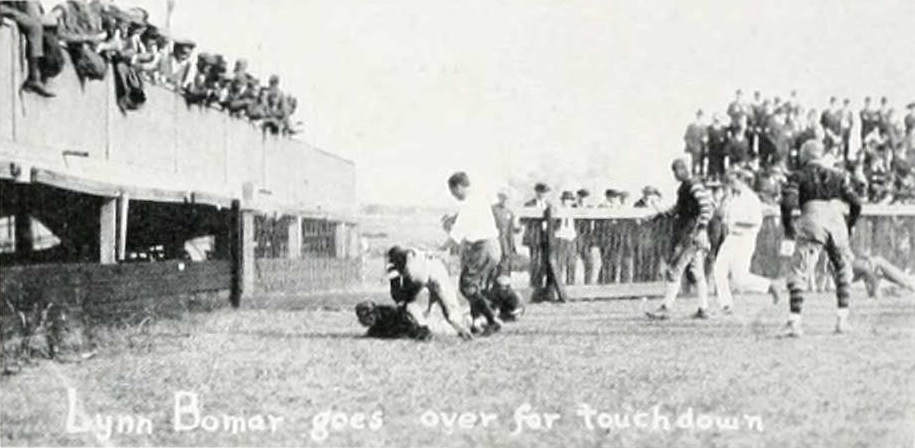
Lynn Bomar as he scored his first quarter touchdown for Vanderbilt.

Vanderbilt at Alabama

Team	1	2	3	4	Total
• Vanderbilt	7	0	0	7	14
Alabama	0	0	0	0	0

- Date: November 5
- Location: Rickwood Field
  Birmingham, AL

As they entered their game against Vanderbilt, the Alabama team had much uncertainty of the outcome as the Commodores were undefeated. Played at Birmingham, Alabama was able to play with Vanderbilt, but fell short in this 14–0 loss. Midway through the first quarter, the Commodores took a 7–0 lead on a short Lynn Bomar touchdown run. The score remained the same through the fourth quarter when a Paul Stumb interception set up the final Vanderbilt scoring drive. Jess Neely then led the Commodores downfield where Rupert Smith made the final score 14–0 with his three-yard touchdown run.

=== Florida ===
Florida at Alabama

Team	1	2	3	4	Total
• Florida	6	0	0	3	9
Alabama	0	0	2	0	2

- Date: November 11
- Location: Denny Field
  Tuscaloosa, AL
- Game attendance: 5,000

On homecoming in Tuscaloosa, the Florida Gators upset the Crimson Tide 9–2 at Denny Field. Florida took a 6–0 lead on a 12-yard run by either Ark Newton or Ferdinand H. Duncan in the first quarter. After a scoreless second, Alabama scored their only points in the third after L. O. Wesley blocked a Newton punt that was recovered by Newton for a safety. The Gators then made the final score 9–2 on a 20-yard Newton field goal in the fourth quarter.

=== Georgia ===
Alabama at Georgia

Team	1	2	3	4	Total
Alabama	0	0	0	0	0
• Georgia	7	0	0	15	22

- Date: November 19
- Location: Ponce de Leon Park
  Atlanta, GA

Playing in rainy, muddy conditions at Atlanta, the Crimson Tide lost their third consecutive game to the Georgia Bulldogs 22–0. After each team fumbled the ball on successive possessions, the Bulldogs scored their first touchdown on a six-yard James Reynolds run in the first quarter. The score remained 7–0 through the fourth quarter when Georgia closed the game with 15 points in the final period. First, Hugh Whelchel blocked a Charles Bartlett punt that Bartlett recovered for a safety. James Spicer and Teany Randall then scored on short touchdown runs that capped a pair of long drives and made the final score 22–0.

=== Mississippi A&M ===
Mississippi A&M at Alabama

Team	1	2	3	4	Total
Miss. A&M	0	0	7	0	7
Alabama	0	7	0	0	7

- Date: November 24
- Location: Rickwood Field
  Birmingham, AL

In their final home game of the season, Alabama tied the Mississippi A&M (now known as Mississippi State University) Aggies 7–7 on Thanksgiving at Rickwood Field. After a scoreless first quarter, Alabama took a 7–0 lead on a 15-yard touchdown pass from Hulet Whitaker to Charles Bartlett. C. B. Cameron then tied the game 7–7 with his 55-yard punt return in the third quarter. Each team had opportunities to win late in the game, but failed to convert on each occasion.

=== Tulane ===
Alabama at Tulane

Team	1	2	3	4	Total
• Alabama	0	0	0	14	14
Tulane	0	0	0	7	7

- Date: December 3
- Location: Second Tulane Stadium
  New Orleans, LA
- Game attendance: 4,000

Alabama avoided their first losing season since the 1903 season after they defeated the Tulane Green Wave 14–7 in a game that featured a wild fourth quarter. After the first three quarters were scoreless (Alabama once fumbling the ball away at Tulane's 3-yard line), the Green Wave scored early in the fourth and took a 7–0 lead. Alabama answered with a 65-yard drive, capped with a 20-yard Charles Bartlett touchdown run that tied the game 7–7. Later in the quarter, Alabama drove down the field and scored to take a 14–7 lead on a second Bartlett touchdown run. As the clocked wound down in the final seconds, Tulane had the ball at the Alabama 40 yard line. The Green Wave then appeared to score a game-tying touchdown on a 40-yard pass completion. However, the referee ruled that time had expired as he had blown the whistle before Tulane snapped the ball. The Tulane fans rioted and stormed the field and the referee required a police escort to escape.

== Personnel ==
=== Varsity letter winners ===
==== Line ====
Player	Hometown	Position	Games started	Prep school	Height	Weight	Age
George Baker	Cleveland, Ohio	Tackle					
J. E. Blackwood	Birmingham, Alabama	Guard					
Al Clemens	Scottsboro, Alabama	End					
Ernest Cooper	St. Stephens, Alabama	Tackle					
Clayton H. Hudson	Montgomery, Alabama	End					
Ben Hunt	Scottsboro, Alabama	Guard					
William Milner Kelly	Birmingham, Alabama	End					
William Gabriel Montgomery	Birmingham, Alabama	Tackle					
Tom Newton	Birmingham, Alabama	End					

==== Backfield ====
Player	Hometown	Position	Games started	Prep school	Height	Weight	Age
Charles Bartlett	Marlin, Texas	Halfback					
William C. Baty	Bessemer, Alabama	Halfback					
J. H. Emmett	Albertville, Alabama	Halfback					
Jack Hovater	Russellville, Alabama	Back				190	
Lelias E. Kirby	Albertville, Alabama	Halfback					
Max Rosenfeld	Birmingham, Alabama	Quarterback					
Lester Thomas	Birmingham, Alabama	Fullback					

==== Other ====
Player	Hometown	Position
William Almon		Manager

=== Coaching staff ===
Name	Position	Seasons at Alabama	Alma mater
Xen C. Scott	Head coach	3	
Hank Crisp	Assistant coach	1	VPI (1920)
William T. Van de Graaff	Assistant coach	1	Alabama (1916)
