= 1921 Ole Miss Rebels football team =

American college football season

1921 Ole Miss Rebels football

Bacardi Bowl, L 0–13 vs. Cuban Athletic Club
- Conference: Southern Intercollegiate Athletic Association
- Record: 3–6 (1–3 SIAA)
- Head coach: R. L. Sullivan (3rd season)
- Home stadium: Hemingway Stadium

1921 Southern Intercollegiate Athletic Association football standings
	Conf.					Overall
Team	W		L		T	W		L		T
Centre +	5	–	0	–	0	10	–	1	–	0
Georgia +	6	–	0	–	1	7	–	2	–	1
Georgia Tech +	5	–	0	–	0	8	–	1	–	0
Vanderbilt +	5	–	0	–	1	7	–	0	–	1
Tennessee	4	–	1	–	1	6	–	2	–	1
Florida	4	–	1	–	2	6	–	3	–	2
Mississippi College	3	–	1	–	1	7	–	2	–	1
Sewanee	4	–	2	–	0	6	–	2	–	0
Transylvania	2	–	1	–	0	4	–	4	–	0
LSU	2	–	1	–	1	6	–	1	–	1
South Carolina	2	–	1	–	1	5	–	1	–	2
Furman	4	–	2	–	1	7	–	2	–	1
Auburn	3	–	2	–	0	5	–	3	–	0
Mississippi A&M	2	–	3	–	1	4	–	4	–	1
Tulane	3	–	4	–	0	4	–	6	–	0
Alabama	2	–	4	–	2	5	–	4	–	2
Oglethorpe	2	–	4	–	0	5	–	4	–	0
Chattanooga	2	–	4	–	0	4	–	6	–	0
The Citadel	1	–	2	–	1	3	–	3	–	2
Kentucky	1	–	3	–	1	4	–	3	–	1
Ole Miss	1	–	4	–	0	3	–	6	–	0
Howard (AL)	1	–	4	–	0	3	–	6	–	0
Mercer	1	–	5	–	0	3	–	6	–	0
Louisville	0	–	1	–	0	2	–	2	–	1
Wofford	0	–	2	–	0	2	–	7	–	0
Georgetown (KY)	0	–	3	–	0	2	–	6	–	0
Millsaps	0	–	3	–	0	1	–	5	–	1
Clemson	0	–	5	–	2	1	–	6	–	2
+ – Conference co-champions

The 1921 Ole Miss Rebels football team represented the University of Mississippi (Ole Miss) as a member of the Southern Intercollegiate Athletic Association (SIAA) during the 1921 college football season. Led by third-year head coach R. L. Sullivan, the Rebels compiled an overall record of 3–6, with a mark of 1–3 in conference play, and a loss in the Bacardi Bowl. Ole Miss played home games at Hemingway Stadium in Oxford, Mississippi.

== Schedule ==
Date	Opponent	Site	Result	Source
October 1	West Tennessee State Normal*	Hemingway Stadium; Oxford, MS (rivalry)	W 82–0	
October 8	at Tulane	Tulane Stadium; New Orleans, LA	L 0–26	
October 15	Millsaps	Hemingway Stadium; Oxford, MS	W 49–0	
October 22	Southwestern Presbyterian*	Hemingway Stadium; Oxford, MS	W 35–0	
October 28	vs. Mississippi A&M	Greenwood, MS	L 0–21	
November 5	vs. Mississippi College	Vicksburg Fairgrounds; Vicksburg, MS	L 7–27	
November 12	at LSU	State Field; Baton Rouge, LA (rivalry)	L 0–21	
November 19	at Tennessee Docs*	Hodges Field; Memphis, TN	L 6–24	
December 31	at Cuban Athletic Club*	Almandares Park; Havana, Cuba (Bacardi Bowl)	L 0–13	
*Non-conference game
