= 1921 Clemson Tigers football team =

American college football season

1921 Clemson Tigers football
- Conference: Southern Intercollegiate Athletic Association
- Record: 1–6–2 (0–4–2 SIAA)
- Head coach: E. J. Stewart (1st season)
- Captain: J. H. Spearman
- Home stadium: Riggs Field

1921 Southern Intercollegiate Athletic Association football standings
	Conf.					Overall
Team	W		L		T	W		L		T
Centre +	5	–	0	–	0	10	–	1	–	0
Georgia +	6	–	0	–	1	7	–	2	–	1
Georgia Tech +	5	–	0	–	0	8	–	1	–	0
Vanderbilt +	5	–	0	–	1	7	–	0	–	1
Tennessee	4	–	1	–	1	6	–	2	–	1
Florida	4	–	1	–	2	6	–	3	–	2
Mississippi College	3	–	1	–	1	7	–	2	–	1
Sewanee	4	–	2	–	0	6	–	2	–	0
Transylvania	2	–	1	–	0	4	–	4	–	0
LSU	2	–	1	–	1	6	–	1	–	1
South Carolina	2	–	1	–	1	5	–	1	–	2
Furman	4	–	2	–	1	7	–	2	–	1
Auburn	3	–	2	–	0	5	–	3	–	0
Mississippi A&M	2	–	3	–	1	4	–	4	–	1
Tulane	3	–	4	–	0	4	–	6	–	0
Alabama	2	–	4	–	2	5	–	4	–	2
Oglethorpe	2	–	4	–	0	5	–	4	–	0
Chattanooga	2	–	4	–	0	4	–	6	–	0
The Citadel	1	–	2	–	1	3	–	3	–	2
Kentucky	1	–	3	–	1	4	–	3	–	1
Ole Miss	1	–	4	–	0	3	–	6	–	0
Howard (AL)	1	–	4	–	0	3	–	6	–	0
Mercer	1	–	5	–	0	3	–	6	–	0
Louisville	0	–	1	–	0	2	–	2	–	1
Wofford	0	–	2	–	0	2	–	7	–	0
Georgetown (KY)	0	–	3	–	0	2	–	6	–	0
Millsaps	0	–	3	–	0	1	–	5	–	1
Clemson	0	–	5	–	2	1	–	6	–	2
+ – Conference co-champions

The 1921 Clemson Tigers football team represented Clemson Agricultural College—now known as Clemson University—as a member of the Southern Intercollegiate Athletic Association (SIAA) during the 1921 college football season. Under first-year head coach E. J. Stewart, the Tigers posted an overall record of 1–6–2 with a mark of 0–4–2 in SIAA play. J. H. Spearman was the team captain.

== Schedule ==
Date	Opponent	Site	Result	Attendance	Source
October 1	at Centre*	Cheek Field; Danville, KY	L 0–14	3,000	
October 7	Presbyterian*	Riggs Field; Calhoun, SC	W 34–0		
October 14	at Auburn	Drake Field; Auburn, AL (rivalry)	L 0–56		
October 21	at Furman	Manly Field; Greenville, SC	T 0–0		
October 27	at South Carolina	State Fairgrounds; Columbia, SC (rivalry)	L 0–21		
November 5	at Georgia Tech	Grant Field; Atlanta, GA (rivalry)	L 7–48		
November 10	vs. The Citadel	County Fairgrounds; Orangeburg, SC	T 7–7		
November 18	Erskine*	Riggs Field; Calhoun, SC	L 0–13		
November 24	at Georgia	Sanford Field; Athens, GA (rivalry)	L 0–28		
*Non-conference game
