= Pinkey Hunt =

American football quarterback and fullback

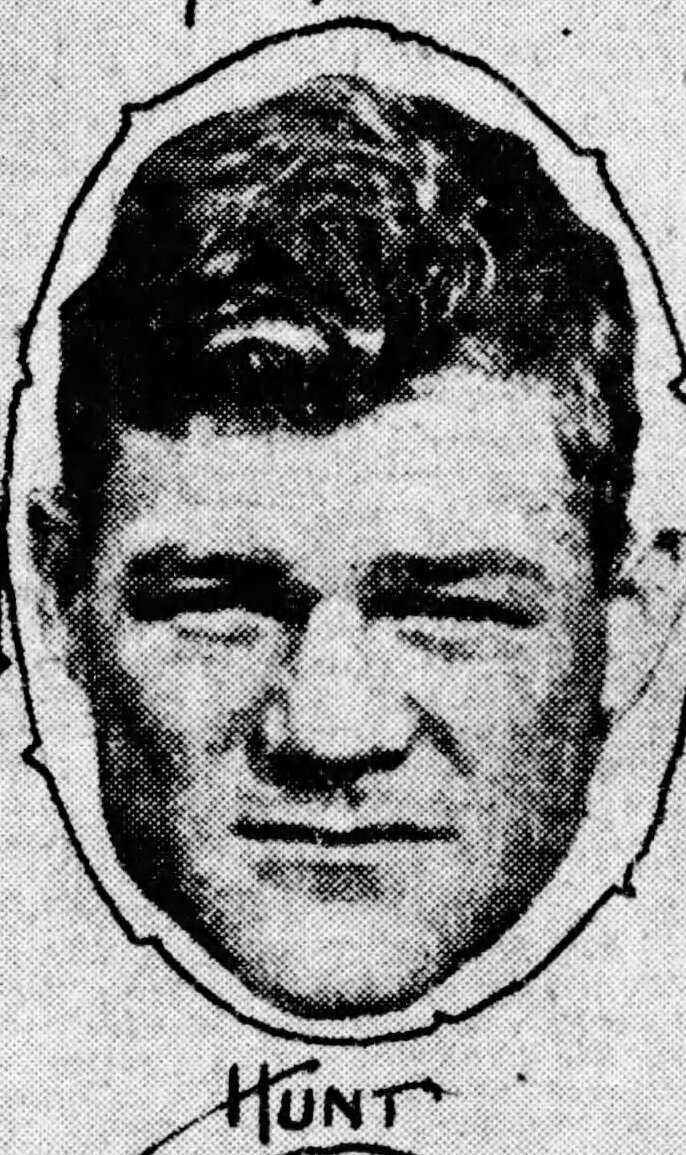

Profile
- Positions: Fullback, quarterback

Career information
- College: Georgia Tech (1920–1923)

Alexander "Pinkey" Hunt was a college football player for the Georgia Tech Yellow Jackets football team. He was a running back; the quarterback of the 1923 team. He scored the touchdown to beat Clemson in 1920. In 1922, he made Billy Evans's Southern Honor Roll.

== See also ==
- List of Georgia Tech Yellow Jackets starting quarterbacks
