= 1921 North Texas State Normal football team =

American college football season

1921 North Texas State Normal football
- Conference: Independent
- Record: 3–3
- Head coach: Theron J. Fouts (2nd season)
- Home stadium: Eagle Field

1921 Southern college football independents records
| | Conf. | | | Overall |
| Team | W | L | T | W | | L | | T |
|---|---|---|---|---|---|---|---|---|
| Tennessee Docs | | – | | 8 | – | 0 | – | 0 |
| Southwest Texas State | | – | | 7 | – | 0 | – | 0 |
| Talladega | | – | | 4 | – | 0 | – | 1 |
| Navy | | – | | 6 | – | 1 | – | 0 |
| Sam Houston Normal | | – | | 3 | – | 1 | – | 2 |
| Erskine | | – | | 6 | – | 2 | – | 0 |
| Marshall | | – | | 5 | – | 2 | – | 1 |
| Delaware | | – | | 5 | – | 4 | – | 0 |
| West Virginia | | – | | 5 | – | 4 | – | 1 |
| Middle Tennessee State Normal | | – | | 3 | – | 2 | – | 1 |
| East Tennessee State Normal | | – | | 4 | – | 3 | – | 0 |
| Birmingham–Southern | | – | | 4 | – | 4 | – | 1 |
| Louisville | | – | | 2 | – | 2 | – | 1 |
| Marion | | – | | 4 | – | 4 | – | 0 |
| Spring Hill | | – | | 4 | – | 4 | – | 0 |
| West Tennessee State Normal | | – | | 4 | – | 5 | – | 1 |
| Mississippi Normal | | – | | 3 | – | 4 | – | 0 |
| Western Kentucky State Normal | | – | | 2 | – | 4 | – | 1 |
| Loyola (LA) | | – | | 2 | – | 4 | – | 0 |
| Roanoke | | – | | 3 | – | 7 | – | 0 |
| Abilene Christian | | – | | 2 | – | 5 | – | 0 |
| Bryson College | | – | | 2 | – | 5 | – | 0 |
| Stetson | | – | | 1 | – | 4 | – | 0 |
| Texas Mines | | – | | 1 | – | 4 | – | 0 |
| Wake Forest | | – | | 2 | – | 8 | – | 0 |
| Presbyterian | | – | | 1 | – | 7 | – | 0 |

The 1921 North Texas State Normal football team was an American football team that represented the North Texas State Normal College (now known as the University of North Texas) during the 1921 college football season as an independent. In their second year under head coach Theron J. Fouts, the team compiled an overall record of 3–3.

== Schedule ==
| Date | Time | Opponent | Site | Result | Source |
|---|---|---|---|---|---|
| October 3 | | Grubbs Vocational | Eagle Field; Denton, TX | W 41–6 | |
| October 8 | | Simmons (TX) | Eagle Field; Denton, TX | L 0–6 | |
| October 22 | | Tarleton Agricultural College | Eagle Field; Denton, TX | L 0–13 | |
| November | | Burleson | Eagle Field; Denton, TX | W 61–12 | |
| November 18 | | at Decatur Baptist | Decatur, TX | W 33–6 | |
| November 24 | 3:30 p.m. | at Southwest Texas State | Evans Field; San Marcos, TX | L 0–14 | |
All times are in Central time
