= 1909 Holy Trinity Hilltoppers football team =

American college football season

1909 Holy Trinity Hilltoppers football
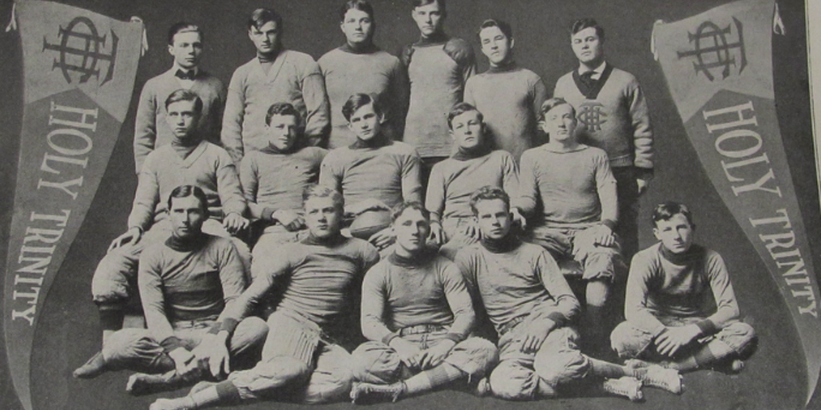

North Texas Interscholastic Association champion
- Conference: North Texas Interscholastic Association
- Record: 7–3 ( North Texas Interscholastic Association)
- Head coach: Joe Utay (2nd season)

The 1909 Holy Trinity Hilltoppers football team represented the Holy Trinity College during the 1909 college football season. The team posted a 7–3 record and won the North Texas Interscholastic Association.

== Schedule ==
Date	Opponent	Site	Result	Source
October 2	Fort Worth High School	Dallas, TX	W 6–0	
October 15	Fort Worth University	Dallas, TX	W 12–0	
October 23	at Carlisle Military Institute (TX)	Arlington, TX	W 25–0	
October 28	at Burleson	Greenville, TX	W 33–11	
November 1	Wesley	Dallas, TX	W 33–0	
November 6	at Austin	Sherman, TX	L 0–10	
November 13	at Texas A&M	Kyle Field; College Station, TX	L 0–44	
November 16	Terrill Prep	Dallas, TX	W 17–0	
November 20	Dallas High School	Dallas, TX	W 26–5	
December 18	at Peacock Military Academy	San Antonio, TX	L 2–15	
