= Utay =

Utay is a surname. Notable people with the surname include:

- Joe Utay (1887–1977), American football player
- William Utay (born 1947), American actor
