= 1924 Texas Longhorns football team =

American college football season

1924 Texas Longhorns football
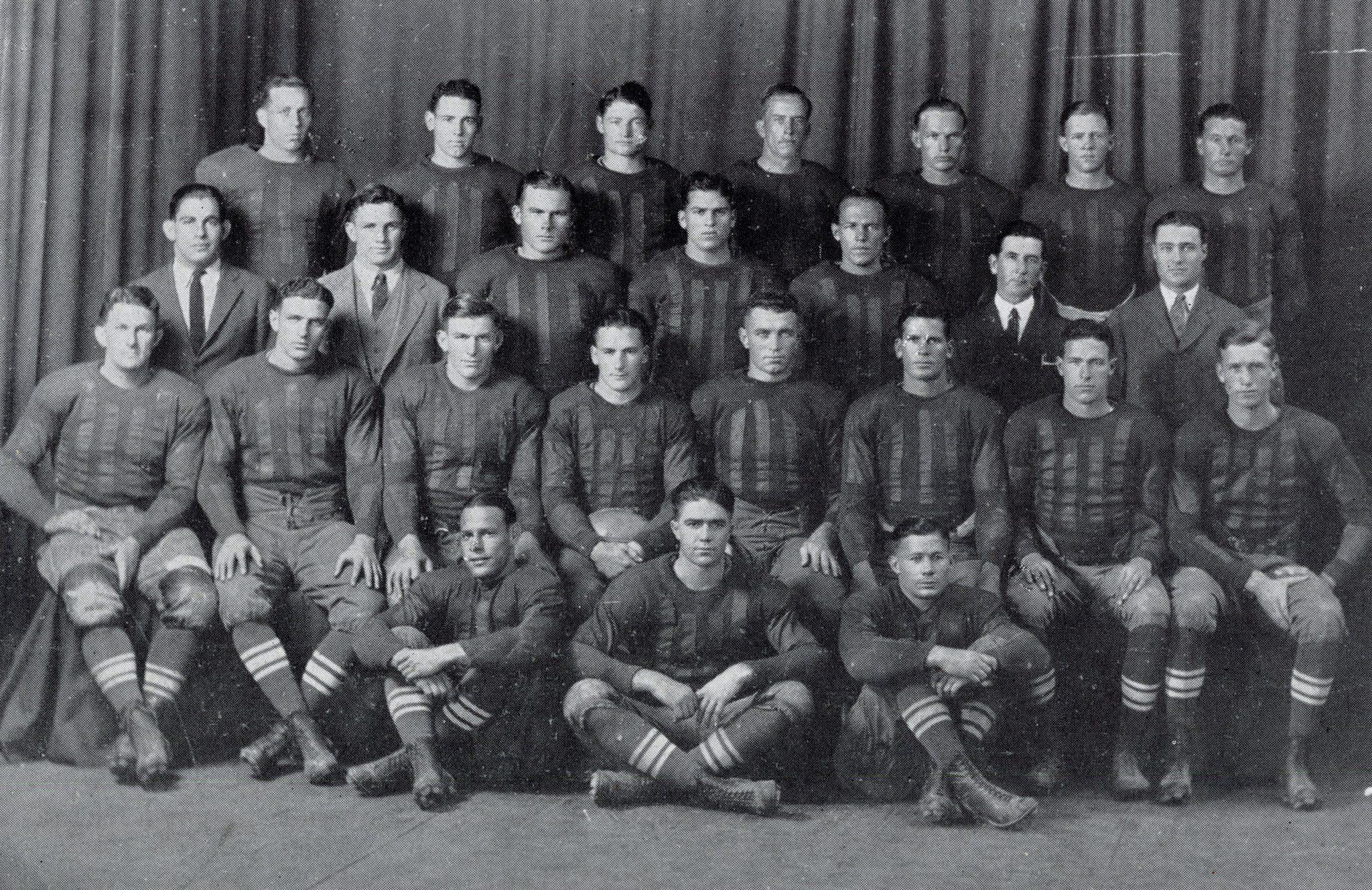
- Conference: Southwest Conference
- Record: 5–3–1 (2–3 SWC)
- Head coach: E. J. Stewart (2nd season)
- Captain: James Marley
- Home stadium: Clark Field; War Memorial Stadium

1924 Southwest Conference football standings
	Conf.					Overall
Team	W		L		T	W		L		T
Baylor $	4	–	0	–	1	7	–	2	–	1
SMU	2	–	0	–	4	5	–	0	–	4
Rice	2	–	2	–	0	4	–	4	–	0
Texas A&M	2	–	2	–	1	7	–	2	–	1
Oklahoma A&M	1	–	1	–	1	6	–	1	–	2
Texas	2	–	3	–	0	5	–	3	–	1
Arkansas	1	–	2	–	1	7	–	2	–	1
TCU	1	–	5	–	0	4	–	5	–	0
$ – Conference champion

The 1924 Texas Longhorns football team was an American football team that represented the University of Texas (now known as the University of Texas at Austin) as a member of the Southwest Conference (SWC) during the 1924 college football season. In their second year under head coach E. J. Stewart, the Longhorns compiled an overall record of 5–3–1, with a mark of 2–3 in conference play, and finished sixth in the SWC.

== Schedule ==
Date	Opponent	Site	Result	Source
September 27	Southwestern (TX)*	Clark Field; Austin, TX	W 27–0	
October 4	Phillips*	Clark Field; Austin, TX	W 27–0	
October 11	Howard Payne*	Clark Field; Austin, TX	W 6–0	
October 18	at SMU	Fair Park Stadium; Dallas, TX	L 6–10	
October 25	Florida*	Clark Field; Austin, TX	T 7–7	
November 1	at Rice	Rice Field; Houston, TX (rivalry)	L 6–19	
November 8	Baylor	War Memorial Stadium; Austin, TX (rivalry)	L 10–28	
November 15	at TCU	Clark Field; Fort Worth, TX (rivalry)	W 13–0	
November 27	Texas A&M	War Memorial Stadium; Austin, TX (rivalry)	W 7–0	
*Non-conference game
