= List of Memphis Tigers head football coaches =

The Memphis Tigers football team represents the University of Memphis in college football. The team competes in the West Division of the American Athletic Conference as part of the NCAA Division I Football Bowl Subdivision. The team has had 25 head coaches since it began in 1912. Since the end of the 2019 regular season, Ryan Silverfield has served as head coach of the Tigers.

As of the conclusion of the 2025 season, the team has played 1,129 games all-time. In that time, six head coaches and one interim coach have led the Tigers in postseason play. The first was Ralph Hatley in 1956, who led Memphis to a 32–12 victory over Middle Tennessee in the Burley Bowl, a game not sanctioned by the NCAA. The second was Billy J. Murphy, who, in his final year at the helm in Memphis, took the Tigers to the Pasadena Bowl, where they defeated San Jose State. After Murphy, the Tigers did not make another postseason appearance until Tommy West's third season, where Memphis started a streak of six bowl games in seven years, starting with the 2003 New Orleans Bowl and ending with the 2008 St. Petersburg Bowl. The final two of Justin Fuente's four seasons produced postseason appearances for the Tigers, the 2014 Miami Beach Bowl and the 2015 Birmingham Bowl. Darrell Dickey coached the latter of the two in an interim capacity following Fuente's departure for Virginia Tech. Mike Norvell, to date, has more postseason appearances with Memphis than any other coach, with six: three conference championships and three bowl games. The team's first-ever New Year's Six bowl appearance came under Ryan Silverfield, who took over from Norvell for the 2019 Cotton Bowl Classic after Norvell departed for Florida State.

Allyn McKeen, who led the Tigers for two years from 1937 to 1938, is the only former Memphis coach to be inducted into the College Football Hall of Fame. In his second and final season at Memphis, McKeen led the Tigers to an undefeated record, their first in eleven years.

== Key ==
Key to symbols in coaches list
General		Overall		Conference		Postseason (Note: Although the first Rose Bowl Game was played in 1902, it has been continuously played since the 1916 game, and is recognized as the oldest bowl game by the NCAA. "—" indicates any season prior to 1916 when postseason games were not played.)	
No.	Order of coaches (Note: A running total of the number of head coaches, with coaches who served separate tenures being counted only once. Interim head coaches are represented with "Int" and are not counted in the running total. "—" indicates the team played but either without a coach or no coach is on record. "X" indicates an interim year without play.)	GC	Games coached	CW	Conference wins	PW	Postseason wins
DC	Division championships	OW	Overall wins	CL	Conference losses	PL	Postseason losses
CC	Conference championships	OL	Overall losses	CT	Conference ties	PT	Postseason ties
NC	National championships	OT	Overall ties (Note: Overtime rules in college football were introduced in 1996, making ties impossible in the period since.)	C%	Conference winning percentage		
†	Elected to the College Football Hall of Fame	O%	Overall winning percentage (Note: When computing the win–loss percentage, a tie counts as half a win and half a loss.)				

== Coaches ==
List of head football coaches showing season(s) coached, overall records, conference records, postseason records, championships and selected awards (Note: The statistics displayed in the table are correct as of the end of the 2025 NCAA Division I FBS football season.)
No.	Name	Season(s)	GC	OW	OL	OT	O%	CW	CL	CT	C%	PW	PL	PT	DC	CC	NC	Awards
1	Clyde H. Wilson	1912–1915	22	9	12	1	0.432											
2	Tom Shea	1916	6	2	3	1	0.417											
3	V. M. Campbell	1917, 1919	12	6	6	0	0.500											
4	John Childerson	1918	6	2	4	0	0.333											
5	Elmer George	1920	5	0	5	0	0.000											
6	Rollin Wilson	1921	10	4	5	1	0.450											
7	Lester Barnard	1922–1923	19	11	5	3	0.694											
8	Zach Curlin	1924–1936	117	43	60	14	0.427	18	12	4	0.588					2		
9	Allyn McKeen †	1937–1938	19	13	6	0	0.684	6	6	0	0.500					1		College Football Hall of Fame (1991)
10	Cecil C. Humphreys	1939–1941	30	14	16	0	0.467	10	8	0	0.556							
11	Lefty Jamerson	1942	9	2	7	0	0.222	1	2	0	0.333							
12	Ralph Hatley	1947–1957	107	59	43	5	0.575					1	0	0				
13	Billy J. Murphy †	1958–1971	136	91	44	1	0.673	16	3	0	0.842	1	0	0		3		
14	Fred Pancoast	1972–1974	33	20	12	1	0.621	2	2	0	0.500							
15	Richard Williamson	1975–1980	66	31	35	0	0.470											
16	Rex Dockery	1981–1983	33	8	24	1	0.258											
17	Rey Dempsey	1984–1985	22	7	12	3	0.386											
18	Charlie Bailey	1986–1988	33	12	20	1	0.379											
19	Chuck Stobart	1989–1994	66	29	36	1	0.447											
20	Rip Scherer	1995–2000	66	22	44	0	0.333	11	19		0.367							
21	Tommy West	2001–2009	110	49	61		0.445	32	39		0.451	2	3					
22	Larry Porter	2010–2011	24	3	21		0.125	1	15		0.063							
23	Justin Fuente	2012–2015	50	26	24		0.520	17	15		0.531	1	0			1		American Athletic Conference Coach of the Year (2014)
Int	Darrell Dickey	2015	1	0	1		0.000					0	1					
24	Mike Norvell	2016–2019	53	38	15		0.717	24	8		0.750	1	5		3	1		
25	Ryan Silverfield	2019–2025	75	50	25		0.667	27	21		0.563	4	1					
Int	Reggie Howard	2025	1	0	1		.000	0	0		–	0	1					
26	Charles Huff	2026–present	0	0	0		–	0	0		–	0	0					
