= 1924 TCU Horned Frogs football team =

American college football season

1924 TCU Horned Frogs football
- Conference: Southwest Conference
- Record: 4–5 (1–5 SWC)
- Head coach: Matty Bell (2nd season)
- Home stadium: Clark Field

1924 Southwest Conference football standings
	Conf.					Overall
Team	W		L		T	W		L		T
Baylor $	4	–	0	–	1	7	–	2	–	1
SMU	2	–	0	–	4	5	–	0	–	4
Rice	2	–	2	–	0	4	–	4	–	0
Texas A&M	2	–	2	–	1	7	–	2	–	1
Oklahoma A&M	1	–	1	–	1	6	–	1	–	2
Texas	2	–	3	–	0	5	–	3	–	1
Arkansas	1	–	2	–	1	7	–	2	–	1
TCU	1	–	5	–	0	4	–	5	–	0
$ – Conference champion

The 1924 TCU Horned Frogs football team represented Texas Christian University (TCU) as a member of the Southwest Conference (SWC) during the 1924 college football season. Led by second -year head coach Matty Bell, the Horned Frogs compiled an overall 4–5 record with a conference mark of 1–5, placing last of eight teams in the SWC. TCU played their at Clark Field, located on campus in Fort Worth, Texas.

== Schedule ==
Date	Time	Opponent	Site	Result	Source
September 26		East Texas State*	Clark Field; Fort Worth, TX	W 46–0	
October 4		Daniel Baker*	Clark Field; Fort Worth, TX	W 13–12	
October 11		Oklahoma A&M	Clark Field; Fort Worth, TX	W 17–10	
October 18		at Simmons (TX)*	Abilene, TX	W 7–0	
October 25	3:00 p.m.	Rice	Clark Field; Fort Worth, TX	L 3–7	
November 1		SMU	Clark Field; Fort Worth, TX (rivalry)	L 0–6	
November 7		at Texas A&M	Kyle Field; College Station, TX	L 0–28	
November 15		Texas	Clark Field; Fort Worth, TX (rivalry)	L 0–13	
November 27		at Arkansas	The Hill; Fayetteville, AR	L 0–20	
*Non-conference game; All times are in Central time
