= List of UTEP Miners head football coaches =

List of head football coaches for the UTEP Miners

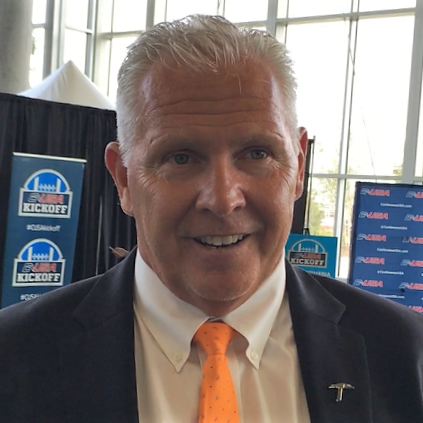
Dana Dimel served as head coach of the Miners from 2018 to 2023.

The UTEP Miners college football team represents University of Texas at El Paso (UTEP) in the Mountain West Conference. The Miners compete as part of the NCAA Division I Football Bowl Subdivision. The program has had 26 head coaches since it began play during the 1914 season. Since December 2023, Scotty Walden has served as head coach at UTEP.

Eight coaches have led UTEP in postseason bowl games and played in the Sun Bowl eight different times. UTEP has a 5–9 record in 14 bowl games in which they have competed. The Miners have been conference champions twice in their history, once in the Border Conference and once in the Western Athletic Conference.

Saxon spent the most seasons (18) as the Miners' head coach and took the program to its first bowl game. The highest winning percentage by any coach is by Mike Brumbelow, who was the head coach of the team from 1950 to 1956, and went 46–24–3 (.651) in his career. The lowest winning percentage for any coach is by Thomas C. Holliday, who went 0–5 (.000) in 1921. Bobby Dobbs coached the last Miner bowl game win in 1967 beating Ole Miss 14–7. The Miners have not won a bowl game in the 57 years since Bobby Dobbs did it with his Flyin' Miners.

== Key ==
Key to symbols in coaches list
General		Overall		Conference		Postseason (Note: Although the first Rose Bowl Game was played in 1902, it has been continuously played since the 1916 game, and is recognized as the oldest bowl game by the NCAA. "—" indicates any season prior to 1916 when postseason games were not played.)	
No.	Order of coaches (Note: A running total of the number of head coaches, with coaches who served separate tenures being counted only once. Interim head coaches are represented with "Int" and are not counted in the running total. "—" indicates the team played but either without a coach or no coach is on record. "X" indicates an interim year without play.)	GC	Games coached	CW	Conference wins	PW	Postseason wins
DC	Division championships	OW	Overall wins	CL	Conference losses	PL	Postseason losses
CC	Conference championships	OL	Overall losses	CT	Conference ties	PT	Postseason ties
NC	National championships	OT	Overall ties (Note: Overtime rules in college football were introduced in 1996, making ties impossible in the period since.)	C%	Conference winning percentage		
†	Elected to the College Football Hall of Fame	O%	Overall winning percentage (Note: When computing the win–loss percentage, a tie counts as half a win and half a loss.)				

== Coaches ==
List of head football coaches showing season(s) coached, overall records, conference records, postseason records, championships and selected awards (Note: Statistics correct as of the end of the 2025 NCAA Division I FBS football season.)
No.	Name	Year(s) (Note: UTEP did not field a team for their 1918 and 1943–1945 seasons.)	Season(s)	GC	OW	OL	OT	O%	CW	CL	CT	C%	PW	PL	PT	DC	CC	NC	Awards
1	Tommy Dwyer	1914–1917; 1919	4, 1	21	9	11	1	0.452	—	—	—	—	—	—	—	—	—	0	—
2	Harry Van Surdam	1920	1	6	2	4	0	0.333	—	—	—	—	—	—	—	—	—	0	—
3	Thomas C. Holliday	1921	1	5	1	4	0	0.200	—	—	—	—	—	—	—	—	—	0	—
4	Jack C. Vowell	1922–1923	2	16	8	8	0	0.500	—	—	—	—	—	—	—	—	—	0	—
5	George B. Powell	1924–1926	3	20	11	7	2	0.600	—	—	—	—	—	—	—	—	—	0	—
6	E. J. Stewart	1927–1928	2	14	5	6	3	0.464	—	—	—	—	—	—	—	—	—	0	—
7	Mack Saxon	1929–1941	13	118	66	43	9	0.597	16	14	3	0.530	0	1	0	—	0	0	—
8	Walter Milner	1942	1	9	5	4	0	0.556	4	3	0	0.571	0	0	0	—	0	0	—
9	Jack Curtice	1946–1949	4	40	24	13	3	0.638	13	10	2	0.560	1	1	0	—	0	0	—
10	Mike Brumbelow	1950–1956	7	73	46	24	3	0.651	25	15	2	0.619	2	1	0	—	1	0	—
11	Ben Collins	1957–1961	5	48	18	29	1	0.385	9	15	0	0.375	0	0	0	—	0	0	—
12	Bum Phillips	1962	1	9	4	5	0	0.444	—	—	—	—	0	0	0	—	—	0	—
13	Warren Harper	1963–1964	2	20	3	15	2	0.200	—	—	—	—	0	0	0	—	—	0	—
14	Bobby Dobbs	1965–1972	8	78	41	35	2	0.538	17	13	0	0.567	2	0	0	—	0	0	—
15	Tommy Hudspeth	1972–1973	2	15	1	14	0	0.067	1	10	0	0.091	0	0	0	—	0	0	—
16	Gil Bartosh	1974–1976	3	34	6	28	0	0.176	3	17	0	0.150	0	0	0	—	0	0	—
17	Bill Michael	1977–1981	5	48	5	43	0	0.104	2	25	0	0.074	0	0	0	—	0	0	—
Int	Billy Alton	1981	1	9	1	8	0	0.111	1	6	0	0.143	0	0	0	—	0	0	—
18	Bill Yung	1982–1985	4	46	7	39	0	0.152	3	28	0	0.097	0	0	0	—	0	0	—
19	Bob Stull	1986–1988	3	36	21	15	0	0.583	13	11	0	0.542	0	1	0	—	0	0	—
20	David Lee	1989–1993	5	53	11	41	1	0.217	5	29	1	0.157	0	0	0	—	0	0	—
21	Charlie Bailey	1993–1999	7	74	19	53	2	0.270	11	40	1	0.221	0	0	0	0	0	0	—
22	Gary Nord	2000–2003	4	48	14	34	—	0.292	10	22	—	0.313	0	1	—	—	1	0	—
23	Mike Price	2004–2012; 2017	9, 1	116	48	68	—	0.414	30	49	—	0.380	0	3	—	0	0	0	—
24	Sean Kugler	2013–2017	5	54	18	36	—	0.333	11	22	—	0.333	0	1	—	0	0	0	—
25	Dana Dimel	2018–2023	6	69	20	49	—	0.290	10	34	—	0.227	0	1	—	0	0	0	—
26	Scotty Walden	2024–present	2	24	5	19	—	0.208	4	12	—	0.250	0	0	—	—	0	0	—
