= 1924 Rice Owls football team =

American college football season

1924 Rice Owls football
- Conference: Southwest Conference, Texas Intercollegiate Athletic Association
- Record: 4–4 (2–2 SWC, 2–1 TIAA)
- Head coach: John Heisman (1st season)
- Home stadium: Rice Field

1924 Southwest Conference football standings
	Conf.					Overall
Team	W		L		T	W		L		T
Baylor $	4	–	0	–	1	7	–	2	–	1
SMU	2	–	0	–	4	5	–	0	–	4
Rice	2	–	2	–	0	4	–	4	–	0
Texas A&M	2	–	2	–	1	7	–	2	–	1
Oklahoma A&M	1	–	1	–	1	6	–	1	–	2
Texas	2	–	3	–	0	5	–	3	–	1
Arkansas	1	–	2	–	1	7	–	2	–	1
TCU	1	–	5	–	0	4	–	5	–	0
$ – Conference champion

1924 Texas Intercollegiate Athletic Association football standings
	Conf.					Overall
Team	W		L		T	W		L		T
Howard Payne $	5	–	0	–	0	7	–	2	–	0
North Texas State Teachers	4	–	1	–	1	5	–	3	–	1
Southwest Texas State	4	–	2	–	0	5	–	3	–	0
Rice	2	–	1	–	0	4	–	4	–	0
Southwestern (TX)	3	–	2	–	0	4	–	5	–	0
Austin	2	–	2	–	1	7	–	3	–	1
West Texas State	2	–	2	–	0	5	–	4	–	0
Daniel Baker	2	–	4	–	1	3	–	6	–	1
Trinity (TX)	2	–	4	–	2	2	–	7	–	2
Simmons (TX)	2	–	4	–	0	2	–	6	–	0
Abilene Christian	1	–	3	–	0	3	–	4	–	2
East Texas State	1	–	3	–	0	3	–	5	–	1
Sam Houston State	1	–	3	–	1	2	–	5	–	1
$ – Conference champion

The 1924 Rice Owls football team was an American football team that represented Rice Institute as a member of the Southwest Conference (SWC) during the 1924 college football season. In its first season under head coach John Heisman, the team compiled a 4–4 record (2–2 against SWC opponents) and was outscored by a total of 85 to 69.

== Schedule ==
Date	Time	Opponent	Site	Result	Source
October 4		Sam Houston State	Rice Field; Houston, TX	W 22–6	
October 11		Southwestern (TX)	Rice Field; Houston, TX	W 20–6	
October 18		LSU*	Rice Field; Houston, TX	L 0–12	
October 25	3:00 p.m.	at TCU	Clark Field; Fort Worth, TX	W 7–3	
November 1		Texas	Rice Field; Houston, TX (rivalry)	W 19–6	
November 7		Austin	Rice Field; Houston, TX	L 2–6	
November 14		at Texas A&M	Kyle Field; College Station, TX	L 6–13	
November 27		Baylor	Rice Field; Houston, TX	L 9–17	
*Non-conference game; All times are in Central time
