= 1924 Daniel Baker Hill Billies football team =

American college football season

1924 Daniel Baker Hill Billies football
- Conference: Texas Intercollegiate Athletic Association
- Record: 3–6–1 (2–4–1 TIAA)
- Head coach: Grady Higginbotham (1st season)
- Captain: Frank Stringer

1924 Texas Intercollegiate Athletic Association football standings
	Conf.					Overall
Team	W		L		T	W		L		T
Howard Payne $	5	–	0	–	0	7	–	2	–	0
North Texas State Teachers	4	–	1	–	1	5	–	3	–	1
Southwest Texas State	4	–	2	–	0	5	–	3	–	0
Rice	2	–	1	–	0	4	–	4	–	0
Southwestern (TX)	3	–	2	–	0	4	–	5	–	0
Austin	2	–	2	–	1	7	–	3	–	1
West Texas State	2	–	2	–	0	5	–	4	–	0
Daniel Baker	2	–	4	–	1	3	–	6	–	1
Trinity (TX)	2	–	4	–	2	2	–	7	–	2
Simmons (TX)	2	–	4	–	0	2	–	6	–	0
Abilene Christian	1	–	3	–	0	3	–	4	–	2
East Texas State	1	–	3	–	0	3	–	5	–	1
Sam Houston State	1	–	3	–	1	2	–	5	–	1
$ – Conference champion

The 1924 Daniel Baker Hill Billies football team represented Daniel Baker College as a member of the Texas Intercollegiate Athletic Association (TIAA) during the 1924 college football season. Led by Grady Higginbotham in his first season and only season as head coach, the team went 3–6–1.

== Schedule ==
Date	Opponent	Site	Result	Source
September	Schreiner*	Brownwood, TX?	W 25–7	
October 4	at TCU*	Clark Field; Fort Worth, TX	L 12–13	
October 10	at Sam Houston State	Huntsville, TX	T 0–0	
October 17	at North Texas State Teachers	Denton, TX	L 0–10	
October 24	St. Edward's*	Brownwood, TX	L 0–7	
October 30	at Simmons (TX)	Abilene, TX	L 0–17	
November 7	at Southwest Texas State	Evans Field; San Marcos, TX	L 0–9	
November 11	Trinity (TX)	Brownwood, TX	W 7–0	
November 22	at West Texas State	Canyon, TX	W 3–0	
November 27	at Abilene Christian	Abilene, TX	L 0–3	
*Non-conference game
