= 1921 Bryson College Huskies football team =

American college football season

1921 Bryson College Huskies football
- Conference: Independent
- Record: 2–5
- Head coach: Monte McDaniel (1st season)

1921 Southern college football independents records
	Conf.			Overall
Team	W	L	T	W		L		T
Tennessee Docs		–		8	–	0	–	0
Southwest Texas State		–		7	–	0	–	0
Talladega		–		4	–	0	–	1
Navy		–		6	–	1	–	0
Sam Houston Normal		–		3	–	1	–	2
Erskine		–		6	–	2	–	0
Marshall		–		5	–	2	–	1
Delaware		–		5	–	4	–	0
West Virginia		–		5	–	4	–	1
Middle Tennessee State Normal		–		3	–	2	–	1
East Tennessee State Normal		–		4	–	3	–	0
Birmingham–Southern		–		4	–	4	–	1
Louisville		–		2	–	2	–	1
Marion		–		4	–	4	–	0
Spring Hill		–		4	–	4	–	0
West Tennessee State Normal		–		4	–	5	–	1
Mississippi Normal		–		3	–	4	–	0
Western Kentucky State Normal		–		2	–	4	–	1
Loyola (LA)		–		2	–	4	–	0
Roanoke		–		3	–	7	–	0
Abilene Christian		–		2	–	5	–	0
Bryson College		–		2	–	5	–	0
Wake Forest		–		2	–	8	–	0
Texas Mines		–		1	–	4	–	0
Presbyterian		–		1	–	7	–	0

The 1921 Bryson College Huskies football team was an American football team that represented the Bryson College of Fayetteville, Tennessee as an independent during the 1921 college football season, and they compiled a 2–5 record.

== Schedule ==
Date	Opponent	Site	Result	Attendance	Source
September 30	at Chattanooga	Chamberlain Field; Chattanooga, TN	L 0–53		
October 8	at Sewanee	Hardee Field; Sewanee, TN	L 0–103		
October 15	at Alabama	Denny Field; Tuscaloosa, AL	L 0–95		
October 29	at St. Bernard Preparatory School	Cullman, AL	W 28–13		
November 5	Southwestern Presbyterian	Fayetteville, TN	W 7–0		
November 13	Bethel (KY)	Fayetteville, TN	L 0–16		
November 24	at Morgan Prep	Petersburg, TN	L 0–54	3,500	
