= Dixie Classic =

Dixie Classic may refer to:

- Dixie Classic (basketball tournament), a college basketball tournament held in Raleigh, North Carolina from 1949 to 1960
- Dixie Classic (bowl game), a college football bowl game held in Dallas, Texas, in 1922, 1925, and 1934
- Dixie Classic Fair, an annual fair held in Winston-Salem, North Carolina since 1882

== See also ==
- Dixie Bowl, a college football bowl game held in Birmingham, Alabama, in 1948 and 1949
