= 1924 Texas A&M Aggies football team =

American college football season

1924 Texas A&M Aggies football
- Conference: Southwest Conference
- Record: 7–2–1 (2–2–1 SWC)
- Head coach: Dana X. Bible (7th season)
- Home stadium: Kyle Field

1924 Southwest Conference football standings
	Conf.					Overall
Team	W		L		T	W		L		T
Baylor $	4	–	0	–	1	7	–	2	–	1
SMU	2	–	0	–	4	5	–	0	–	4
Rice	2	–	2	–	0	4	–	4	–	0
Texas A&M	2	–	2	–	1	7	–	2	–	1
Oklahoma A&M	1	–	1	–	1	6	–	1	–	2
Texas	2	–	3	–	0	5	–	3	–	1
Arkansas	1	–	2	–	1	7	–	2	–	1
TCU	1	–	5	–	0	4	–	5	–	0
$ – Conference champion

The 1924 Texas A&M Aggies football team represented the Agricultural and Mechanical College of Texas—now known as Texas A&M University—as a member of the Southwest Conference (SWC) during the 1924 college football season. In their seventh year under head coach Dana X. Bible, the team compiled an overall record of 7–2–1, with a mark of 2–2–1 in conference play, and finished fourth in the SWC.

== Schedule ==
Date	Opponent	Site	Result	Attendance	Source
September 20	John Tarleton*	Kyle Field; College Station, TX	W 40–0		
September 26	Trinity (TX)*	Kyle Field; College Station, TX	W 33–0		
October 3	Southwestern (TX)*	Kyle Field; College Station, TX	W 54–0		
October 11	vs. Sewanee*	Fair Park Stadium; Dallas, TX	W 7–0		
October 17	Second District Agricultural (AR)*	Kyle Field; College Station, TX	W 40–0		
October 25	at SMU	Fair Park Stadium; Dallas, TX	T 7–7		
November 1	at Baylor	Cotton Palace; Waco, TX (rivalry)	L 7–15	20,000	
November 7	TCU	Kyle Field; College Station, TX (rivalry)	W 28–0		
November 14	at Rice	Rice Field; Houston, TX	W 13–6		
November 27	at Texas	War Memorial Stadium; Austin, TX (rivalry)	L 0–7		
*Non-conference game
