= William Flynn (American football) =

Billy Flynn
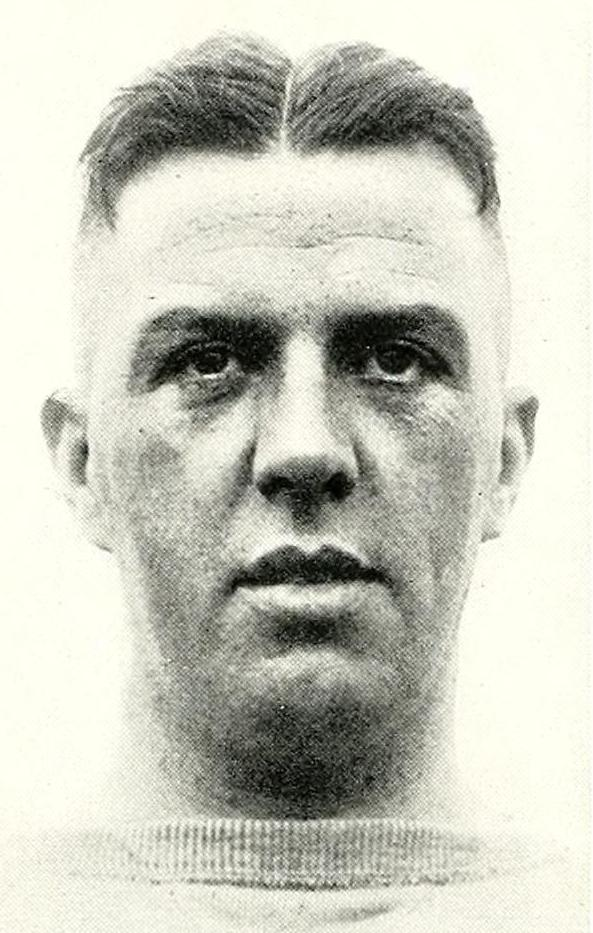
- Flynn at Loyola in 1923

Biographical details
- Born: c. 1896
- Died: October 9, 1958 (aged 62); Morristown, New Jersey, U.S.

Playing career
- 1919–1920: Holy Cross

Coaching career (HC unless noted)
- 1921–1923: Loyola (LA)
- 1925–1926: Cheverus HS (ME)
- 1927–1933: Asbury Park HS (NJ)
- 1934–1958: Morristown HS (NJ)

Administrative career (AD unless noted)
- 1921–1924: Loyola (LA)

Head coaching record
- Overall: 11–8–2 (college)

William K. Flynn (c. 1896 – October 9, 1958) was an American football coach. He served as the head coach at Loyola University New Orleans from 1921 to 1923, compiling a record of 11–8–2.

== Biography ==
A native of Taunton, Massachusetts, Flynn attended graduated from St. Mary's High School. He then attended the College of the Holy Cross, where he played fullback on the Crusaders football team. He graduated in 1921.

On March 12, 1921, the Loyola University New Orleans hired Flynn as its athletic director and football coach. He was tasked with starting up an athletics program at the school, and he coached the football team in its inaugural season in 1921. Although the Associated Press described the first season as "unsuccessful", Flynn improved the team incrementally over his next two years. In 1923, Loyola compiled a 5–1–1 record. After three seasons at the helm, Flynn stepped down as coach and was replaced by Moon Ducote.

In 1925, Flynn was hired by the Catholic Institute High School (renamed Cheverus High School) in Portland, Maine. In 1927, he became the supervisor of physical training and head football, baseball, and basketball coach at Asbury Park High School in Asbury Park, New Jersey. He won three three state championships at Asbury Park. In 1934, he became the head football coach at Morristown High School in Morristown, New Jersey, a post he held until his death. A resident of Morristown, Flynn died on October 9, 1958, at Morristown Memorial Hospital.

== Head coaching record ==
=== College ===
Year	Team	Overall	Conference	Standing	Bowl/playoffs
Loyola Wolf Pack (Independent) (1921–1923)
1921	Loyola	2–4			
1922	Loyola	4–3–1			
1923	Loyola	5–1–1			
Loyola:		11–8–2			
Total:		11–8–2			
