= Monte McDaniel =

American football player and coach (1895–1986)

Biographical details
- Born: April 18, 1895; Belfast, Tennessee, U.S.
- Died: September 7, 1986 (aged 91)

Playing career
- 1915–1916: Erskine

Coaching career (HC unless noted)
- 1921–1926: Bryson
- 1927–1929: Cumberland (TN)
- 1931–1934: Clarksville HS (TN)

Head coaching record
- Overall: 19–16–1 (high school)

Monte McDaniel or Monty McDaniel (April 18, 1895 – September 7, 1986) was an American football player and coach. He served as the head football coach at Bryson College in Fayetteville, Tennessee from 1921 to 1926 and Cumberland University in Lebanon, Tennessee from 1927 to 1929. McDaniel was the head football coach at Clarksville High School in Clarksville, Tennessee from 1931 to 1934, tallying a mark of 19–16–1.
