= Sylvester Derby =

American football player and coach (1892–1974)

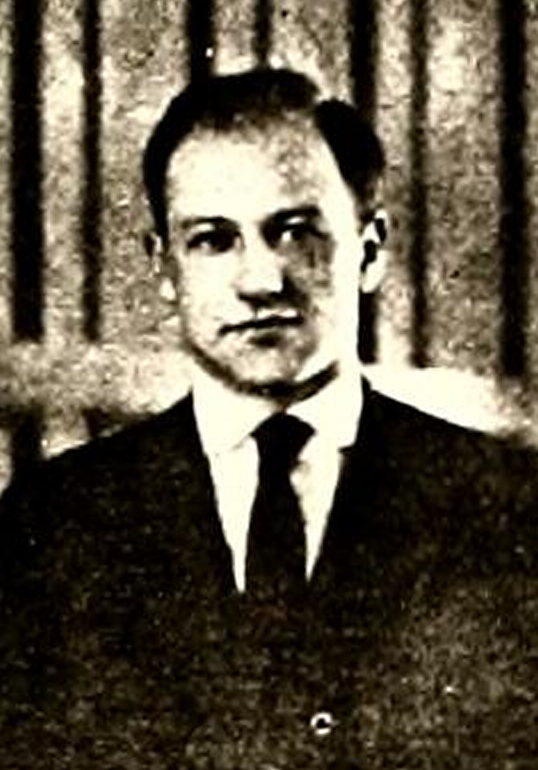
- Derby pictured in The Forester 1921, Lake Forest yearbook

Biographical details
- Born: February 13, 1892; Lemont, Illinois, U.S.
- Died: June 5, 1974 (aged 82); Kokomo, Indiana, U.S.

Playing career

Football
- 1913–1914: Illinois
- Position: End

Coaching career (HC unless noted)

Football
- 1919–1920: Lake Forest
- 1921: Delaware

Basketball
- 1920–1921: Lake Forest

Head coaching record
- Overall: 13–10–2 (football); 5–9 (basketball)

Sylvester Randall Derby (February 13, 1892 – June 5, 1974) was an American college football head coach. He coached for two seasons at Lake Forest College in Illinois where he compiled an 8–6–2 overall record. Derby then moved on to coach the Delaware Fightin' Blue Hens football team in 1921 where he finished 5–4 in one season.

== Head coaching record ==
=== Football ===
Year	Team	Overall	Conference	Standing	Bowl/playoffs
Lake Forest Foresters (Illinois Intercollegiate Athletic Conference) (1919–1920)
1919	Lake Forest	3–3–2			
1920	Lake Forest	5–3			
Lake Forest:		8–6–2			
Delaware Fightin' Blue Hens (Independent) (1921)
1921	Delaware	5–4			
Delaware:		5–4			
Total:		13–10–2			
