= 1924 Sam Houston State Bearkats football team =

American college football season

1924 Sam Houston State Bearkats football
- Conference: Texas Intercollegiate Athletic Association
- Record: 2–5–1 (1–3–1 TIAA)
- Head coach: J. W. Jones (2nd season)
- Home stadium: Pritchett Field

1924 Texas Intercollegiate Athletic Association football standings
	Conf.					Overall
Team	W		L		T	W		L		T
Howard Payne $	5	–	0	–	0	7	–	2	–	0
North Texas State Teachers	4	–	1	–	1	5	–	3	–	1
Southwest Texas State	4	–	2	–	0	5	–	3	–	0
Rice	2	–	1	–	0	4	–	4	–	0
Southwestern (TX)	3	–	2	–	0	4	–	5	–	0
Austin	2	–	2	–	1	7	–	3	–	1
West Texas State	2	–	2	–	0	5	–	4	–	0
Daniel Baker	2	–	4	–	1	3	–	6	–	1
Trinity (TX)	2	–	4	–	2	2	–	7	–	2
Simmons (TX)	2	–	4	–	0	2	–	6	–	0
Abilene Christian	1	–	3	–	0	3	–	4	–	2
East Texas State	1	–	3	–	0	3	–	5	–	1
Sam Houston State	1	–	3	–	1	2	–	5	–	1
$ – Conference champion

The 1924 Sam Houston State Bearkats football team represented Sam Houston State Teachers College (now known as Sam Houston State University) as a member of the Texas Intercollegiate Athletic Association (TIAA) during the 1924 college football season. Led by second-year head coach J. W. Jones, the Bearkats compiled an overall record of 2–5–1 with a mark of 1–3–1 in conference play, and finished in 13th place in the TIAA.

== Schedule ==
Date	Opponent	Site	Result	Source
September 26	Stephen F. Austin*	Pritchett Field; Huntsville, TX (rivalry)	L 2–3	
October 4	at Rice	Rice Field; Houston, TX	L 6–22	
October 10	Daniel Baker	Pritchett Field; Huntsville, TX	T 0–0	
October 18	at Southwestern Louisiana*	Girard Field; Lafayette, LA	L 7–28	
October 25	at Southwest Texas State	Evans Field; San Marcos, TX (rivalry)	L 0–13	
November 11	North Texas State	Pritchett Field; Huntsville, TX	L 0–7	
November 21	at East Texas State	Commerce, TX	W 13–12	
November 27	St. Edward's*	Pritchett Field; Huntsville, TX	W	
*Non-conference game
