= 1924 Baylor Bears football team =

American college football season

1924 Baylor Bears football

SWC champion
- Conference: Southwest Conference
- Record: 7–2–1 (4–0–1 SWC)
- Head coach: Frank Bridges (5th season)
- Captain: Ralph D. Pittman
- Home stadium: Carroll Field

1924 Southwest Conference football standings
	Conf.					Overall
Team	W		L		T	W		L		T
Baylor $	4	–	0	–	1	7	–	2	–	1
SMU	2	–	0	–	4	5	–	0	–	4
Rice	2	–	2	–	0	4	–	4	–	0
Texas A&M	2	–	2	–	1	7	–	2	–	1
Oklahoma A&M	1	–	1	–	1	6	–	1	–	2
Texas	2	–	3	–	0	5	–	3	–	1
Arkansas	1	–	2	–	1	7	–	2	–	1
TCU	1	–	5	–	0	4	–	5	–	0
$ – Conference champion

The 1924 Baylor Bears football team represented the Baylor University in the 1924 college football season. In their 5th year under head coach Frank Bridges, the Bears compiled a 7–2–1 record (4–0–1 against conference opponents), won the Southwest Conference championship, and outscored their opponents by a combined total of 149 wins and 66 losses.

No Bears were recognized as All-Americans, and five Bears received all-conference honors: Jack Sisco, Homer "Bear" Walker, Sam Coates, Ralph Pittman, Bill Coffey.

It would be 50 years before Baylor would win another football conference championship, doing so in 1974.

== Schedule ==
Date	Opponent	Site	Result	Attendance	Source
September 27	Simmons (TX)*	West Texas Fairgrounds; Abilene, TX	W 10–6		
October 4	North Texas State Teachers*	Carroll Field; Waco, TX	W 30–0		
October 14	vs. Central State Teachers*	Fair Park Stadium; Dallas, TX	L 6–13		
October 18	Arkansas	Carroll Field; Waco, TX	W 13–0		
October 25	Austin*	Carroll Field; Waco, TX	L 3–7		
November 1	Texas A&M^{†}	Cotton Palace; Waco, TX (rivalry)	W 15–7	20,000	
November 8	at Texas	War Memorial Stadium; Austin, TX (rivalry)	W 28–10		
November 15	SMU	Fair Park Stadium; Dallas, TX	T 7–7	16,000	
November 21	St. Edward's*	Carroll Field; Waco, TX	W 20–7		
November 27	Rice	Rice Field; Houston, TX	W 17–9		
*Non-conference game; ^{†}Homecoming
