= 1925 Dixie Classic =

West Virginia Wesleyan Bobcats	SMU Mustangs
(8–2)	(5–1–4)
Independent	SWC
9	7
Head coach: Bob Higgins	Head coach: Ray Morrison
	1	2	3	4	Total
West Virginia Wesleyan	0	0	3	6	9
SMU	0	0	7	0	7
- Date: January 1, 1925
- Season: 1924
- Stadium: Fair Park
- Location: Dallas, Texas
- Referee: Ed Cochrane
- Attendance: 7,000

The 1925 Dixie Classic was a college football postseason bowl game, the second Dixie Classic held out of three in total. It featured the SMU Mustangs and the West Virginia Wesleyan Bobcats.

== Background ==
SMU had a 19-game unbeaten streak prior to this game, starting with a tie against TCU on December 7, 1922. This was SMU's first ever bowl game. Most notably, both schools had been formed by predecessor bodies to what is now the United Methodist Church. This was West Virginia Wesleyan's only bowl game.

== Game summary ==
SMU's George Watters blocked a Wesleyan punt and recovered it in the end zone for a touchdown, in a game dominated by defense. But Wesleyan would narrow the lead to three leading to the fourth quarter. In what was described as a "luck pass", Wesleyan QB DeLong threw a long pass which was deflected by Logan Stollenweck into the hands of WVW receiver Gale Bullman, who ran 66 yards for a touchdown, though the extra point was blocked. SMU drove in the last part of the game and tried a 30-yard field goal in the final minute, but it missed, ending SMU's 18-game unbeaten streak.
