= 1921 Abilene Christian football team =

American college football season

1921 Abilene Christian football
- Conference: Independent
- Record: 2–5
- Head coach: Russell A. Lewis (1st season)
- Captain: Eldon Sanders

1921 Southern college football independents records
	Conf.			Overall
Team	W	L	T	W		L		T
Tennessee Docs		–		8	–	0	–	0
Southwest Texas State		–		7	–	0	–	0
Talladega		–		4	–	0	–	1
Navy		–		6	–	1	–	0
Sam Houston Normal		–		3	–	1	–	2
Erskine		–		6	–	2	–	0
Marshall		–		5	–	2	–	1
Delaware		–		5	–	4	–	0
West Virginia		–		5	–	4	–	1
Middle Tennessee State Normal		–		3	–	2	–	1
East Tennessee State Normal		–		4	–	3	–	0
Birmingham–Southern		–		4	–	4	–	1
Louisville		–		2	–	2	–	1
Marion		–		4	–	4	–	0
Spring Hill		–		4	–	4	–	0
West Tennessee State Normal		–		4	–	5	–	1
Mississippi Normal		–		3	–	4	–	0
Western Kentucky State Normal		–		2	–	4	–	1
Loyola (LA)		–		2	–	4	–	0
Roanoke		–		3	–	7	–	0
Abilene Christian		–		2	–	5	–	0
Bryson College		–		2	–	5	–	0
Stetson		–		1	–	4	–	0
Texas Mines		–		1	–	4	–	0
Wake Forest		–		2	–	8	–	0
Presbyterian		–		1	–	7	–	0

The 1921 Abilene Christian football team was an American football team that represented Abilene Christian College—now known as Abilene Christian University–as an independent during the 1921 college football season. Led by Russell A. Lewis in his first and only season as head coach, the team compiled a record of 2–5.

== Schedule ==
Date	Opponent	Site	Result	Source
October 8	Dallas	Abilene, TX	L 0–20	
October 14	Midland College	Abilene, TX	W 7–0	
October 21	at West Texas State	Canyon, TX	L 0–35	
October 28	at Howard Payne	Brownwood, TX	L 0–56	
November 11	at Meridian	Meridian, TX	W 37–0	
November 18	at Clarendon	Clarendon, TX	L 0–7	
November 24	at Daniel Baker	Brownwood, TX	L 0–55	
