= O. V. Austin =

American football, basketball, and baseball coach

Biographical details
- Born: September 25, 1890
- Died: May 22, 1960 (aged 69); Mississippi, U.S.

Playing career

Basketball
- 1910–1911: Ole Miss

Baseball
- 1911: Ole Miss

Coaching career (HC unless noted)

Football
- 1921–1923: Mississippi Normal

Basketball
- 1921–1923: Mississippi Normal

Baseball
- 1920–1924: Mississippi Normal

Administrative career (AD unless noted)
- 1921–1924: Mississippi Normal

Head coaching record
- Overall: 8–13 (football); 15–6 (basketball); 33–15–3 (baseball)

Oliver V. "Spout" Austin Sr. (September 25, 1890 – May 22, 1960) was an American college football, college basketball, and college baseball coach. He served as the head football coach at the Mississippi Normal College—now known as the University of Southern Mississippi—in Hattiesburg, Mississippi from 1921 to 1923, compiling a record of 8–13. Austin was also the head basketball coach at Mississippi Normal from 1921 to 1923, tallying a mark of 15–6, and the school's head baseball coach from 1920 to 1924, amassing a record of 33–15–3.

== Head coaching record ==
=== Football ===
Year	Team	Overall	Conference	Standing	Bowl/playoffs
Mississippi Normal Normalites (Independent) (1921–1923)
1921	Mississippi Normal	3–4			
1922	Mississippi Normal	2–6			
1923	Mississippi Normal	3–3			
Mississippi Normal:		8–13			
Total:		8–13			
