= 1924 Arkansas Razorbacks football team =

American college football season

1924 Arkansas Razorbacks football
- Conference: Southwest Conference
- Record: 7–2–1 (1–2–1 SWC)
- Head coach: Francis Schmidt (3rd season)
- Captain: Yandell Rogers
- Home stadium: The Hill

1924 Southwest Conference football standings
	Conf.					Overall
Team	W		L		T	W		L		T
Baylor $	4	–	0	–	1	7	–	2	–	1
SMU	2	–	0	–	4	5	–	0	–	4
Rice	2	–	2	–	0	4	–	4	–	0
Texas A&M	2	–	2	–	1	7	–	2	–	1
Oklahoma A&M	1	–	1	–	1	6	–	1	–	2
Texas	2	–	3	–	0	5	–	3	–	1
Arkansas	1	–	2	–	1	7	–	2	–	1
TCU	1	–	5	–	0	4	–	5	–	0
$ – Conference champion

The 1924 Arkansas Razorbacks football team represented the University of Arkansas in the Southwest Conference (SWC) during the 1924 college football season. In their third year under head coach Francis Schmidt, the Razorbacks compiled a 7–2–1 record (1–2–1 against SWC opponents), finished in seventh place in the SWC, and outscored all opponents by a combined total of 227 to 69.

== Schedule ==
Date	Opponent	Site	Result	Source
September 27	Northeastern State (OK)*	The Hill; Fayetteville, AR	W 54–6	
October 4	Southwest Missouri State*	The Hill; Fayetteville, AR	W 47–0	
October 11	Hendrix*	The Hill; Fayetteville, AR	W 34–3	
October 18	at Baylor	Waco Stadium; Waco, TX	L 0–13	
October 25	Ole Miss*	Kavanaugh Field; Little Rock, AR (rivalry)	W 20–0	
November 1	vs. LSU*	Fair Grounds; Shreveport, LA (rivalry)	W 10–7	
November 8	SMU^{†}	The Hill; Fayetteville, AR	T 14–14	
November 15	Phillips*	Andrews Field; Fort Smith, AR	W 28–6	
November 22	at Oklahoma A&M	Lewis Field; Stillwater, OK	L 0–20	
November 27	vs. TCU	The Hill; Fayetteville, AR	W 20–0	
*Non-conference game; ^{†}Homecoming
