= Theron J. Fouts =

American football player, coach, and administrator (1893–1954)

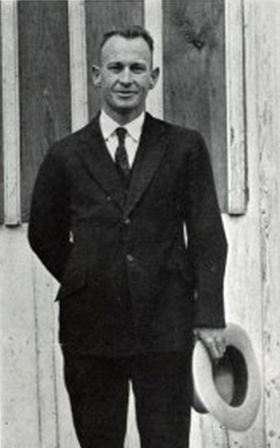
- Fouts pictured in The Yucca 1922, North Texas State Normal yearbook

Biographical details
- Born: July 5, 1893; Gonzales, Texas, U.S.
- Died: April 28, 1954 (aged 60); Denton, Texas, U.S.

Playing career
- 1914–1917: Baylor

Coaching career (HC unless noted)

Football
- 1920–1924: North Texas State Normal/Teachers

Basketball
- 1920–1921: North Texas State Normal

Baseball
- 1920: North Texas State Normal

Administrative career (AD unless noted)
- 1948–1954: North Texas State

Head coaching record
- Overall: 23–14–2 (football); 5–3 (basketball); 4–2 (baseball)

Theron Judson Fouts Sr. (July 5, 1893 – April 28, 1954) was an American football player, coach, and college athletics administrator. He served as head football coach at North Texas State Normal College—renamed as North Texas State Teachers' College in 1923, and now known as the University of North Texas—from 1920 to 1924. Fouts amassed a 23–14–2 record. He also started the school's track and field program and initiated the drive to build the 20,000-seat Eagle Stadium on campus. The venue was named Fouts Field in his honor.

Born in Gonzales, Texas, Fouts was a football player at Baylor University, where he lettered for four years (1914–1917). He died of a heart attack on April 28, 1954, in Denton, Texas. Fouts was married to Leslie Vann Sams Fouts and had two daughters and a son: Mary Lee Fouts (born October 20, 1920, in Crockett, TX), Dorthy Nell Fouts Crockett (born November 7, 1924, in Denton), and Theron Judson Fouts Jr. (born March 3, 1926, in Denton).

== Head coaching record ==
=== Football ===
Year	Team	Overall	Conference	Standing	Bowl/playoffs
North Texas State Normal (Independent) (1920–1921)
1920	North Texas State Normal	7–1			
1921	North Texas State Normal	3–3			
North Texas State Normal/Teachers Eagles (Texas Intercollegiate Athletic Association) (1922–1924)
1922	North Texas State Normal	5–2–1	3–0		
1923	North Texas State Teachers	3–5	3–2	6th	
1924	North Texas State Teachers	5–3–1	4–1–1	2nd	
North Texas State Normal/Teachers:		23–14–2	10–3–1		
Total:		23–14–2			
