= 1924 Oklahoma A&M Cowboys football team =

American college football season

1924 Oklahoma A&M Cowboys football
- Conference: Southwest Conference
- Record: 6–1–2 (1–1–1 SWC)
- Head coach: John Maulbetsch (4th season)
- Home stadium: Lewis Field

1924 Southwest Conference football standings
	Conf.					Overall
Team	W		L		T	W		L		T
Baylor $	4	–	0	–	1	7	–	2	–	1
SMU	2	–	0	–	4	5	–	0	–	4
Rice	2	–	2	–	0	4	–	4	–	0
Texas A&M	2	–	2	–	1	7	–	2	–	1
Oklahoma A&M	1	–	1	–	1	6	–	1	–	2
Texas	2	–	3	–	0	5	–	3	–	1
Arkansas	1	–	2	–	1	7	–	2	–	1
TCU	1	–	5	–	0	4	–	5	–	0
$ – Conference champion

The 1924 Oklahoma A&M Cowboys football team represented Oklahoma A&M College in the 1924 college football season. This was the 24th year of football at A&M and the fourth under John Maulbetsch. The Cowboys played their home games at Lewis Field in Stillwater, Oklahoma. They finished the season 6–1–2, 1–1–1 in the Southwest Conference. This season became the first year OAMC's teams were nicknamed the Cowboys and their final season in the Southwest Conference.

== Schedule ==
Date	Opponent	Site	Result	Attendance	Source
September 27	Southwestern Oklahoma*	Lewis Field; Stillwater, OK	W 9–0		
October 4	at Kansas*	Memorial Stadium; Lawrence, KS	W 3–0		
October 11	at TCU	Clark Field; Fort Worth, TX	L 10–17		
October 18	Missouri Mines*	Lewis Field; Stillwater, OK	W 23–0		
October 25	Phillips*	Lewis Field; Stillwater, OK	W 13–0		
November 1	Oklahoma*^{†}	Lewis Field; Stillwater, OK (Bedlam)	W 6–0		
November 15	at Creighton*	Western League Park; Omaha, NE	T 20–20	5,000	
November 22	Arkansas	Lewis Field; Stillwater, OK	W 20–0		
November 27	at SMU	Fair Park Stadium; Dallas, TX	T 13–13		
*Non-conference game; ^{†}Homecoming
