= 1924 Southwest Texas State Bobcats football team =

American college football season

1924 Southwest Texas State Bobcats football
- Conference: Texas Intercollegiate Athletic Association
- Record: 5–3 (4–2 TIAA)
- Head coach: Oscar W. Strahan (6th season)
- Home stadium: Evans Field

1924 Texas Intercollegiate Athletic Association football standings
	Conf.					Overall
Team	W		L		T	W		L		T
Howard Payne $	5	–	0	–	0	7	–	2	–	0
North Texas State Teachers	4	–	1	–	1	5	–	3	–	1
Southwest Texas State	4	–	2	–	0	5	–	3	–	0
Rice	2	–	1	–	0	4	–	4	–	0
Southwestern (TX)	3	–	2	–	0	4	–	5	–	0
Austin	2	–	2	–	1	7	–	3	–	1
West Texas State	2	–	2	–	0	5	–	4	–	0
Daniel Baker	2	–	4	–	1	3	–	6	–	1
Trinity (TX)	2	–	4	–	2	2	–	7	–	2
Simmons (TX)	2	–	4	–	0	2	–	6	–	0
Abilene Christian	1	–	3	–	0	3	–	4	–	2
East Texas State	1	–	3	–	0	3	–	5	–	1
Sam Houston State	1	–	3	–	1	2	–	5	–	1
$ – Conference champion

The 1924 Southwest Texas State Bobcats football team was an American football team that represented Southwest Texas State Teachers College (now known as Texas State University) during the 1924 college football season as a member of the Texas Intercollegiate Athletic Association (TIAA). In their sixth year under head coach Oscar W. Strahan, the team compiled an overall record of 5–3 with a mark of 4–2 in conference play.

== Schedule ==
Date	Opponent	Site	Result	Source
October 4	Stephen F. Austin*	Evans Field; San Marcos, TX	W 23–6	
October 11	at East Texas State	Lion Field; Commerce, TX	W 2–0	
October 18	St. Edward's*	Evans Field; San Marcos, TX	L 0–20	
October 25	Sam Houston State	Evans Field; San Marcos, TX (rivalry)	W 13–0	
October 31	at North Texas State Teachers	Eagle Field; Denton, TX	W 10–6	
November 7	Daniel Baker	Evans Field; San Marcos, TX	W 9–0	
November 18	Howard Payne	Evans Field; San Marcos, TX	L 6–32	
November 26	at Southwestern (TX)	Snyder Field; Georgetown, TX	L 6–12	
*Non-conference game
