= Russell A. Lewis =

American football coach and educator (1895–1966)

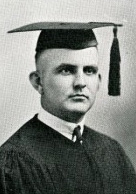
- Lewis pictured in Prickly Pear 1922, Abilene Christian yearbook

Biographical details
- Born: March 26, 1895; Tempe, Arizona, U.S.
- Died: October 19, 1966 (aged 71); Abilene, Texas, U.S.

Playing career
- 1914–1915: Texas University
- ?: San Marcos Normal

Coaching career (HC unless noted)
- 1921: Abilene Christian

Head coaching record
- Overall: 2–5

Russell Austin Lewis (March 26, 1895 – October 19, 1966) was an American football coach and educator. He was the third head football coach at Abilene Christian University in Abilene, Texas and he held that position for the 1921 season. His coaching record at Abilene Christian was 2–5.

== Head coaching record ==
Year	Team	Overall	Conference	Standing	Bowl/playoffs
Abilene Christian (Independent) (1921)
1921	Abilene Christian	2–5			
Abilene Christian:		2–5			
Total:		2–5			
