= 1921 Southwest Texas State Bobcats football team =

American college football season

1921 Southwest Texas State Bobcats football
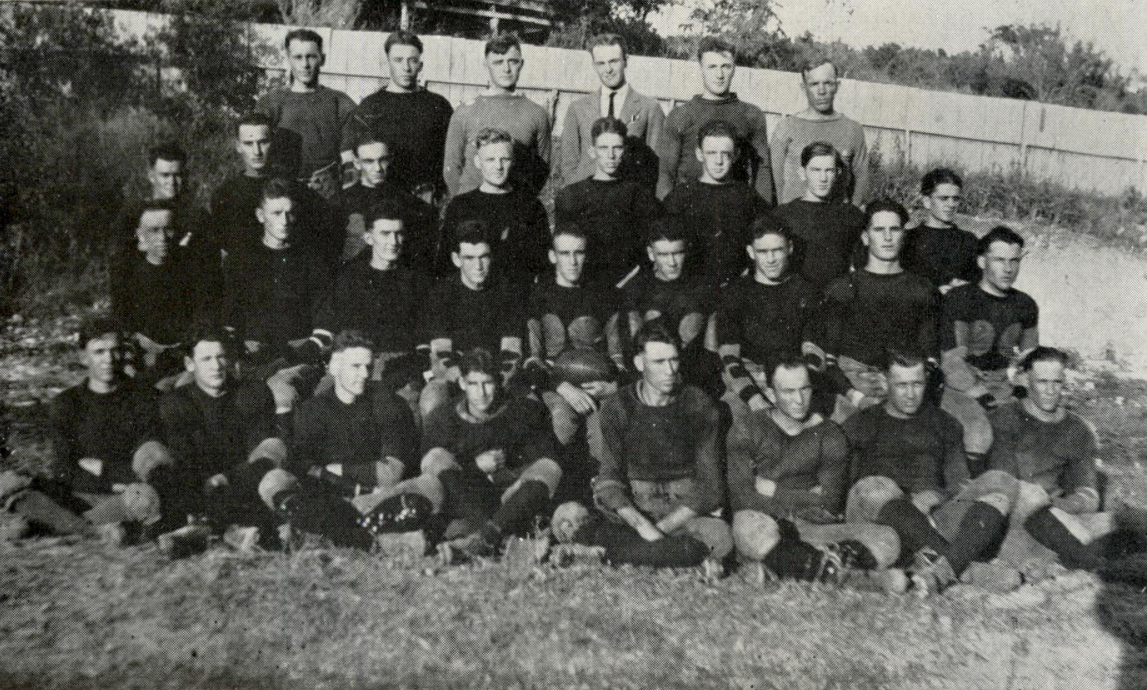

Texas Normal champion
- Conference: Independent
- Record: 7–0
- Head coach: Oscar W. Strahan (3rd season)
- Captain: Pete Shands
- Home stadium: Evans Field

1921 Southern college football independents records
	Conf.			Overall
Team	W	L	T	W		L		T
Tennessee Docs		–		8	–	0	–	0
Southwest Texas State		–		7	–	0	–	0
Talladega		–		4	–	0	–	1
Navy		–		6	–	1	–	0
Sam Houston Normal		–		3	–	1	–	2
Erskine		–		6	–	2	–	0
Marshall		–		5	–	2	–	1
Delaware		–		5	–	4	–	0
West Virginia		–		5	–	4	–	1
Middle Tennessee State Normal		–		3	–	2	–	1
East Tennessee State Normal		–		4	–	3	–	0
Birmingham–Southern		–		4	–	4	–	1
Louisville		–		2	–	2	–	1
Marion		–		4	–	4	–	0
Spring Hill		–		4	–	4	–	0
West Tennessee State Normal		–		4	–	5	–	1
Mississippi Normal		–		3	–	4	–	0
Western Kentucky State Normal		–		2	–	4	–	1
Loyola (LA)		–		2	–	4	–	0
Roanoke		–		3	–	7	–	0
Abilene Christian		–		2	–	5	–	0
Bryson College		–		2	–	5	–	0
Stetson		–		1	–	4	–	0
Texas Mines		–		1	–	4	–	0
Wake Forest		–		2	–	8	–	0
Presbyterian		–		1	–	7	–	0

The 1921 Southwest Texas State Bobcats football team was an American football team that represented Southwest Texas State Normal School—now known as Texas State University–as an independent during the 1921 college football season. Led by third-year head coach Oscar W. Strahan, the team finished the season with a record of 7–0, posting the program's first undefeated season. The Texas Normal championship also earned entry into the Texas Intercollegiate Athletic Association (TIAA). Pete Shand's was the team's captain.

== Schedule ==
Date	Time	Opponent	Site	Result	Source
October 8		at Southwestern (TX)	Snyder Field; Georgetown, TX	W 10–0	
October 14		St. Edward's	San Marcos, TX	W 31–7	
October 21		at Sam Houston Normal	Pritchett Field; Huntsville, TX (rivalry)	W 14–13	
October 28		Daniel Baker	San Marcos, TX	W 28–3	
November 5		at East Texas State	Commerce, TX	W 26–0	
November 11		San Marcos Academy		W 62–3	
November 24	3:30 p.m.	North Texas State Normal^{†}	Evans Field; San Marcos, TX	W 14–0	
^{†}Homecoming; All times are in Central time
