= 1921 Wiley Wildcats football team =

American college football season

1921 Wiley Wildcats football

Black college national co-champion SWAC champion
- Conference: Southwestern Athletic Conference
- Head coach: Jason Grant (1st season)
- Home stadium: Wiley Athletic Park

1921 Southwestern Athletic Conference football standings
	Conf.			Overall
Team	W	L	T	W		L		T
Wiley $		–		7	–	0	–	1
Bishop		–				–
Paul Quinn		–				–
Prairie View		–				–
Samuel Huston		–				–
Texas College		–				–
$ – Conference champion

The 1921 Wiley Wildcats football team was an American football team that represented Wiley College during the 1921 college football season. The Wiley team met Talladega in a post-season game on December 9 to determine the black college football national championship; the game ended in a 7–7 tie and both teams are recognized as co-champions. The Wiley team played its home games at the 1,000-seat Wiley Athletic Park in Marshall, Texas.

== Schedule ==
Date	Time	Opponent	Site	Result	Source
October 14		Jarvis*	Wiley Athletic Park; Marshall, TX	W 41–0	
October 31	10:30 a.m.	vs. Shreveport Central High School*	State Fair Grounds; Shreveport, TX	W 114–0	
November 25	3:00 p.m.	at Paul Quinn	Taborian Park; Waco, TX	W 14–10	
November 26		at Samuel Huston	Austin, TX	W 40–0	
December 2	3:30 p.m.	vs. Prairie View	West End Park; Houston, TX	W 7–3	
December 9	3:00 p.m.	Talladega*	Wiley Athletic Park; Marshall, TX	T 7–7	
*Non-conference game; All times are in Central time
