= 1924 SMU Mustangs football team =

American college football season

1924 SMU Mustangs football

Dixie Classic, L 7–9 vs. West Virginia Wesleyan
- Conference: Southwest Conference
- Record: 5–1–4 (2–0–4 SWC)
- Head coach: Ray Morrison (5th season)
- Captain: Logan Stollenwreck
- Home stadium: Fair Park Stadium

1924 Southwest Conference football standings
	Conf.					Overall
Team	W		L		T	W		L		T
Baylor $	4	–	0	–	1	7	–	2	–	1
SMU	2	–	0	–	4	5	–	0	–	4
Rice	2	–	2	–	0	4	–	4	–	0
Texas A&M	2	–	2	–	1	7	–	2	–	1
Oklahoma A&M	1	–	1	–	1	6	–	1	–	2
Texas	2	–	3	–	0	5	–	3	–	1
Arkansas	1	–	2	–	1	7	–	2	–	1
TCU	1	–	5	–	0	4	–	5	–	0
$ – Conference champion

The 1924 SMU Mustangs football team was an American football team that represented Southern Methodist University (SMU) as a member of the Southwest Conference (SWC) during the 1924 college football season. In its fifth season under head coach Ray Morrison, the team compiled a 5–1–4 record (2–0–4 against SWC opponents), finished second in the conference, and outscored opponents by a total of 92 to 59. SMU was invited to the Dixie Classic, where they lost to West Virginia Wesleyan.

== Schedule ==
Date	Opponent	Site	Result	Attendance	Source
September 27	North Texas State Teachers*	Fair Park Stadium; Dallas, TX (rivalry)	W 7–3		
October 4	Trinity (TX)*	Fair Park Stadium; Dallas, TX	W 14–3		
October 10	Austin*	Fair Park Stadium; Dallas, TX	W 7–0		
October 17	Texas	Fair Park Stadium; Dallas, TX	W 10–6		
October 25	Texas A&M	Fair Park Stadium; Dallas, TX	T 7–7		
November 1	at TCU	Clark Field; Fort Worth, TX (rivalry)	W 6–0		
November 8	at Arkansas	The Hill; Fayetteville, AR	T 14–14		
November 15	Baylor	Fair Park Stadium; Dallas, TX	T 7–7	16,000	
November 27	Oklahoma A&M	Fair Park Stadium; Dallas, TX	T 13–13		
January 1	vs. West Virginia Wesleyan*	Fair Park Stadium; Dallas, TX (Dixie Classic)	L 7–9		
*Non-conference game
