= Dixie Classic (bowl game) =

Defunct American college football bowl game

Dixie Classic (defunct)
- Stadium: Fair Park Stadium (1934) (Note: The 1934 edition was held in the stadium that later became known as the Cotton Bowl, which had opened in 1930.)
- Location: Dallas, Texas
- Previous stadiums: Fair Park (1922, 1925) (Note: The 1922 and 1925 editions were held in a wooden stadium located at the Fair Park fairgrounds.)
- Operated: 1922, 1925, 1934
- Conference tie-ins: Southwest
- Succeeded by: Cotton Bowl Classic

The Dixie Classic was a college football post-season bowl game played intermittently at Fair Park in Dallas, Texas. Team-competitive games were held three times, after the 1921, 1924, and 1933 regular seasons, on or about the ensuing New Year's Day. The January 1922 game is notably remembered as being the origin of the Texas A&M 12th man tradition. The Dixie Classic was phased out in favor of the Cotton Bowl Classic.

Three all-star games, contested under the Dixie Classic name, were played at nearby Ownby Stadium in early January of 1929, 1930, and 1931. Joe Utay, who had played for Texas A&M and helped found the Southwest Conference in 1914, was the games' organizer.

== Game results ==
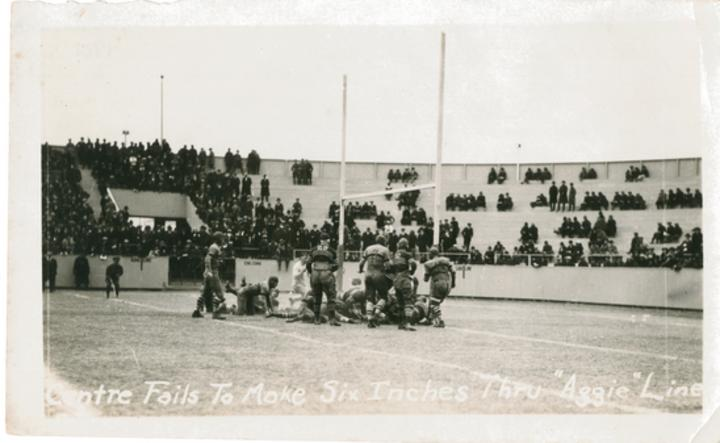
Action during the 1922 game

Bold denotes winning team; italics indicates a tie.

Date	SWC team		Opponent		Attendance	Notes	Ref.
January 2, 1922 (Note: The "Dixie Classic" name was not used until the January 1925 edition of the game.)	**Texas A&M**	**22**	Centre	14	20,000	notes	
January 1, 1925	Southern Methodist	7	**West Virginia Wesleyan**	**9**	7,000	notes	
January 1, 1934	Arkansas	7	Centenary	7	12,000	notes	

Three all-star games, referred to as the Dixie Classic in various newspaper articles, were played at Ownby Stadium in Dallas. The first was on January 2, 1929, when a team of players from the Big Six Conference defeated a team of Southwest Conference (SWC) players, 14–6. A similar game was played on January 1, 1930, with a team of midwest players defeating a team of southwest players, 25–12. On January 1, 1931, a southwest team defeated a midwest team, 18–0.

== Appearances by conference ==
Conference	Record					Appearances by year		
Conference	Games	W	L	T	Win pct.	Won	Lost	Tied
SWC	3	1	1	1	.500	1922	1925	1934
SIAA	2	0	1	1	.250	—N/a	1922	1934
Independent	1	1	0	0	1.000	1925	—N/a	—N/a

== See also ==
- List of college bowl games
