= 1924 North Texas State Teachers Eagles football team =

American college football season

1924 North Texas State Teachers Eagles football
- Conference: Texas Intercollegiate Athletic Association
- Record: 5–3–1 (4–1–1 TIAA)
- Head coach: Theron J. Fouts (5th season)
- Home stadium: Eagle Field

1924 Texas Intercollegiate Athletic Association football standings
	Conf.					Overall
Team	W		L		T	W		L		T
Howard Payne $	5	–	0	–	0	7	–	2	–	0
North Texas State Teachers	4	–	1	–	1	5	–	3	–	1
Southwest Texas State	4	–	2	–	0	5	–	3	–	0
Rice	2	–	1	–	0	4	–	4	–	0
Southwestern (TX)	3	–	2	–	0	4	–	5	–	0
Austin	2	–	2	–	1	7	–	3	–	1
West Texas State	2	–	2	–	0	5	–	4	–	0
Daniel Baker	2	–	4	–	1	3	–	6	–	1
Trinity (TX)	2	–	4	–	2	2	–	7	–	2
Simmons (TX)	2	–	4	–	0	2	–	6	–	0
Abilene Christian	1	–	3	–	0	3	–	4	–	2
East Texas State	1	–	3	–	0	3	–	5	–	1
Sam Houston State	1	–	3	–	1	2	–	5	–	1
$ – Conference champion

The 1924 North Texas State Teachers Eagles football team was an American football team that represented the North Texas State Teachers College (now known as the University of North Texas) during the 1924 college football season as a member of the Texas Intercollegiate Athletic Association (TIAA). In their fifth year under head coach Theron J. Fouts, the team compiled an overall record of 5–3–1 with a mark of 4–1–1 in conference play, placing second in the TIAA.

== Schedule ==
Date	Opponent	Site	Result	Source
September 27	at SMU*	Fair Park Stadium; Dallas, TX (rivalry)	L 3–7	
October 4	at Baylor*	Carroll Field; Waco, TX	L 0–30	
October 10	Decatur Baptist*	Eagle Field; Denton, TX	W 15–3	
October 17	Daniel Baker	Eagle Field; Denton, TX	W 10–0	
October 31	Southwest Texas State	Eagle Field; Denton, TX	L 6–10	
November 7	Simmons (TX)	Eagle Field; Denton, TX	W 12–7	
November 11	at Sam Houston State	Pritchett Field; Huntsville, TX	W 7–0	
November 17	West Texas State	Eagle Field; Denton, TX	W 14–7	
November 27	at Trinity (TX)	Yoakum Field; Waxahachie, TX	T 0–0	
*Non-conference game
