= 1921 Spring Hill Badgers football team =

American college football season

1921 Spring Hill Badgers football
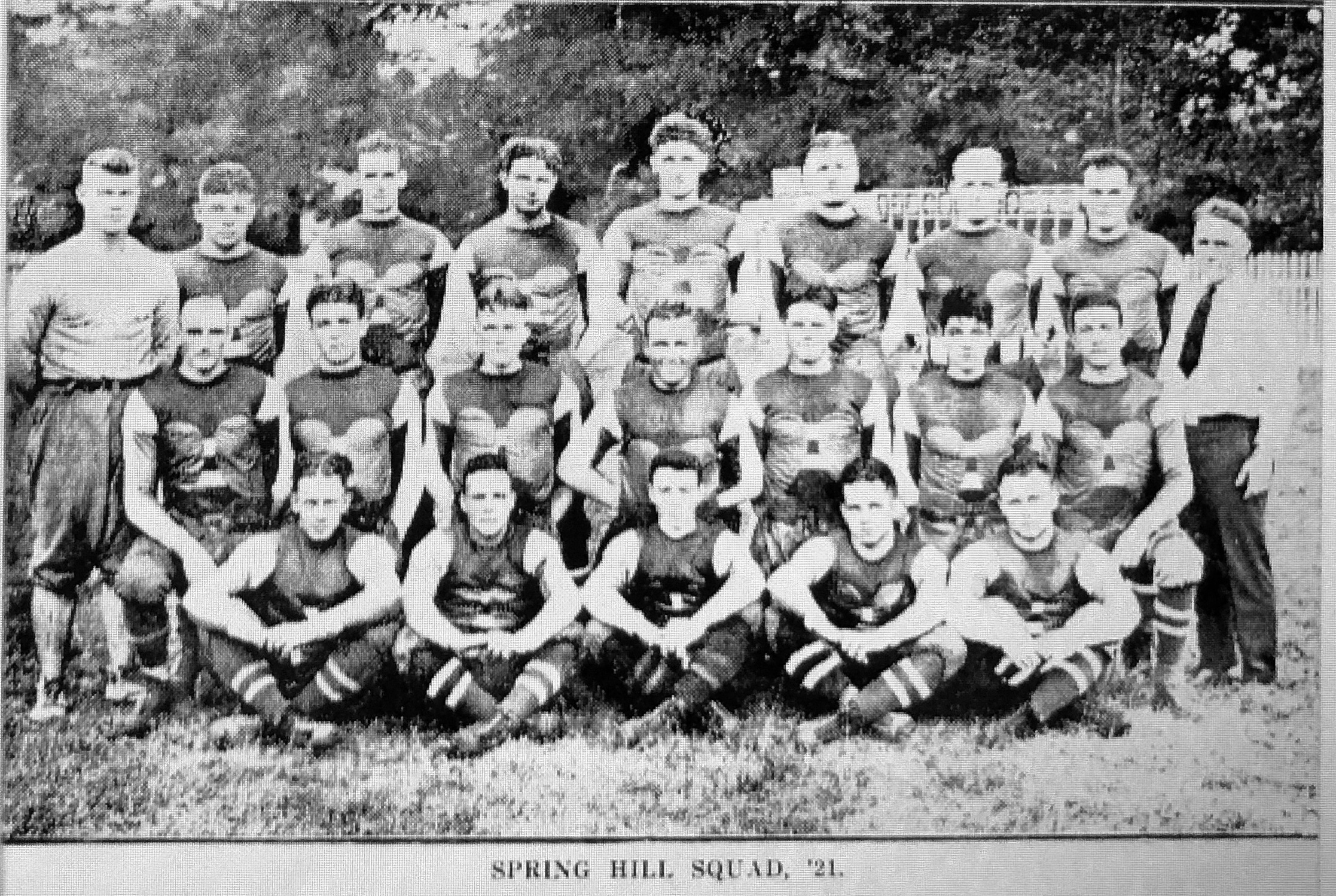
- Conference: Independent
- Record: 4–4
- Head coach: Moon Ducote (3rd season)
- Home stadium: Maxon Field, Monroe Park

1921 Southern college football independents records
	Conf.			Overall
Team	W	L	T	W		L		T
Tennessee Docs		–		8	–	0	–	0
Southwest Texas State		–		7	–	0	–	0
Talladega		–		4	–	0	–	1
Navy		–		6	–	1	–	0
Sam Houston Normal		–		3	–	1	–	2
Erskine		–		6	–	2	–	0
Marshall		–		5	–	2	–	1
Delaware		–		5	–	4	–	0
West Virginia		–		5	–	4	–	1
Middle Tennessee State Normal		–		3	–	2	–	1
East Tennessee State Normal		–		4	–	3	–	0
Birmingham–Southern		–		4	–	4	–	1
Louisville		–		2	–	2	–	1
Marion		–		4	–	4	–	0
Spring Hill		–		4	–	4	–	0
West Tennessee State Normal		–		4	–	5	–	1
Mississippi Normal		–		3	–	4	–	0
Western Kentucky State Normal		–		2	–	4	–	1
Loyola (LA)		–		2	–	4	–	0
Roanoke		–		3	–	7	–	0
Abilene Christian		–		2	–	5	–	0
Bryson College		–		2	–	5	–	0
Stetson		–		1	–	4	–	0
Texas Mines		–		1	–	4	–	0
Wake Forest		–		2	–	8	–	0
Presbyterian		–		1	–	7	–	0

The 1921 Spring Hill Badgers football team was an American football team that represented the Spring Hill College as an independent during the 1921 college football season. In its third season under head coach Moon Ducote, the team compiled a 4–4 record. Three of its losses coming against college football powerhouses, Alabama, Auburn, and LSU. Spring Hill held both Alabama and LSU to 7–7 ties in the first half of those games. The final game of the season was a 28–7 loss to Mississippi College, which was led by College Football Hall of Fame member Goat Hale.

== Schedule ==
Date	Opponent	Site	Result	Source
October 1	at Alabama	Denny Field; Tuscaloosa, AL	L 7–27	
October 8	vs. Auburn	Gunter Park; Montgomery, AL	L 0–44	
October 15	Loyola (LA)	Maxon Field; Mobile, AL	W 28–7	
October 22	at LSU	State Field; Baton Rouge, LA	L 7–41	
October 29	Marion	Monroe Park; Mobile, AL	W 41–0	
November 5	Jefferson College	Maxon Field; Mobile, AL (Convent, LA)	W 84–6	
November 12	Howard (AL)	Mobile, AL	W 7–0	
November 24	Mississippi College	Monroe Park; Mobile, AL	L 7–28	
