= 1921 Tennessee Docs football team =

American college football season

1921 Tennessee Docs football
- Conference: Independent
- Record: 8–0
- Head coach: Bert Hodge (1st season)
- Captain: George L. Carmen
- Home stadium: Hodges Field

1921 Southern college football independents records
	Conf.			Overall
Team	W	L	T	W		L		T
Tennessee Docs		–		8	–	0	–	0
Southwest Texas State		–		7	–	0	–	0
Talladega		–		4	–	0	–	1
Navy		–		6	–	1	–	0
Sam Houston Normal		–		3	–	1	–	2
Erskine		–		6	–	2	–	0
Marshall		–		5	–	2	–	1
Delaware		–		5	–	4	–	0
West Virginia		–		5	–	4	–	1
Middle Tennessee State Normal		–		3	–	2	–	1
East Tennessee State Normal		–		4	–	3	–	0
Birmingham–Southern		–		4	–	4	–	1
Louisville		–		2	–	2	–	1
Marion		–		4	–	4	–	0
Spring Hill		–		4	–	4	–	0
West Tennessee State Normal		–		4	–	5	–	1
Mississippi Normal		–		3	–	4	–	0
Western Kentucky State Normal		–		2	–	4	–	1
Loyola (LA)		–		2	–	4	–	0
Roanoke		–		3	–	7	–	0
Abilene Christian		–		2	–	5	–	0
Bryson College		–		2	–	5	–	0
Stetson		–		1	–	4	–	0
Texas Mines		–		1	–	4	–	0
Wake Forest		–		2	–	8	–	0
Presbyterian		–		1	–	7	–	0

The 1921 Tennessee Docs football team (variously "Docs", "UT Doctors" or the "Tennessee Medicos") represented the University of Tennessee College of Medicine in Memphis in the 1921 college football season. The team outscored its opponents 174 to 12.

== Schedule ==
Date	Opponent	Site	Result	Source
September 30	Tech High School	Memphis Fairgrounds; Memphis, TN	W 41–0	
October 8	Union (TN)	Hodges Field; Memphis, TN	W 14–0	
October 14	Bethel (TN)	Hodges Field; Memphis, TN	W 13–6	
October 24	Middle Tennessee State Normal	Hodges Field; Memphis, TN	W 20–0	
November 4	at Arkansas College	Daffin Field; Batesville, AR	W 19–0	
November 11	Arkansas State Normal	Hodges Field; Memphis, TN	W 28–0	
November 19	Ole Miss	Hodges Field; Memphis, TN	W 24–6	
November 24	at Millsaps	State Fairgrounds; Jackson, MS	W 14–0	
