= Dallas Hilltoppers football =

College football team from Texas

- First season: 1907
- Last season: 1925
- Location: Dallas, Texas
- Conference: Independent
- Colors: Purple and Gold

The Dallas Hilltoppers represented the University of Dallas (Holy Trinity College before 1910) in Dallas in the sport of college football. Hall of famer Joe Utay coached the 1909 team to a 7–1–1 record, and the 1915 team claimed an independent Southwestern championship.
