= 1921 Wake Forest Baptists football team =

American college football season

1921 Wake Forest Baptists football
- Conference: Independent
- Record: 2–8
- Head coach: James L. White (2nd season)
- Captain: Fitzhugh L. Fulton

1921 Southern college football independents records
	Conf.			Overall
Team	W	L	T	W		L		T
Tennessee Docs		–		8	–	0	–	0
Southwest Texas State		–		7	–	0	–	0
Talladega		–		4	–	0	–	1
Navy		–		6	–	1	–	0
Sam Houston Normal		–		3	–	1	–	2
Erskine		–		6	–	2	–	0
Marshall		–		5	–	2	–	1
Delaware		–		5	–	4	–	0
West Virginia		–		5	–	4	–	1
Middle Tennessee State Normal		–		3	–	2	–	1
East Tennessee State Normal		–		4	–	3	–	0
Birmingham–Southern		–		4	–	4	–	1
Louisville		–		2	–	2	–	1
Marion		–		4	–	4	–	0
Spring Hill		–		4	–	4	–	0
West Tennessee State Normal		–		4	–	5	–	1
Mississippi Normal		–		3	–	4	–	0
Western Kentucky State Normal		–		2	–	4	–	1
Loyola (LA)		–		2	–	4	–	0
Roanoke		–		3	–	7	–	0
Abilene Christian		–		2	–	5	–	0
Bryson College		–		2	–	5	–	0
Stetson		–		1	–	4	–	0
Texas Mines		–		1	–	4	–	0
Wake Forest		–		2	–	8	–	0
Presbyterian		–		1	–	7	–	0

The 1921 Wake Forest Baptists football team was an American football team that represented Wake Forest University during the 1921 college football season. In its second season under head coach James L. White, the team compiled a 2–8 record.

== Schedule ==
Date	Time	Opponent	Site	Result	Attendance	Source
September 24		at Georgia Tech	Grant Field; Atlanta, GA	L 0–42		
October 1		at North Carolina	Emerson Field; Chapel Hill, NC (rivalry)	L 0–21		
October 8		at VMI	Alumni Field; Lexington, VA	L 0–20		
October 15		vs. Davidson	Wearn Field; Charlotte, NC	W 10–7		
October 22		vs. William & Mary	League Park; Norfolk, VA	L 14–21		
October 29		Guilford	Wake Forest, NC	W 28–0		
November 5	3:00 p.m.	at Richmond	Stadium Field; Richmond, VA	L 0–41		
November 11	3:00 p.m.	vs. Trinity (NC)	Riddick Field; Raleigh, NC (rivalry)	L 0–17		
November 19		NC State	Wake Forest, NC (rivalry)	L 0–14	8,000	
November 24		vs. Hampden–Sydney	League Park; Norfolk, VA	L 14–39		
All times are in Eastern time
