= 1921 Loyola Wolf Pack football team =

American college football season

1921 Loyola Wolf Pack football
- Conference: Independent
- Record: 2–4
- Head coach: William Flynn (1st season)

1921 Southern college football independents records
	Conf.			Overall
Team	W	L	T	W		L		T
Tennessee Docs		–		8	–	0	–	0
Southwest Texas State		–		7	–	0	–	0
Talladega		–		4	–	0	–	1
Navy		–		6	–	1	–	0
Sam Houston Normal		–		3	–	1	–	2
Erskine		–		6	–	2	–	0
Marshall		–		5	–	2	–	1
Delaware		–		5	–	4	–	0
West Virginia		–		5	–	4	–	1
Middle Tennessee State Normal		–		3	–	2	–	1
East Tennessee State Normal		–		4	–	3	–	0
Birmingham–Southern		–		4	–	4	–	1
Louisville		–		2	–	2	–	1
Marion		–		4	–	4	–	0
Spring Hill		–		4	–	4	–	0
West Tennessee State Normal		–		4	–	5	–	1
Mississippi Normal		–		3	–	4	–	0
Western Kentucky State Normal		–		2	–	4	–	1
Loyola (LA)		–		2	–	4	–	0
Roanoke		–		3	–	7	–	0
Abilene Christian		–		2	–	5	–	0
Bryson College		–		2	–	5	–	0
Stetson		–		1	–	4	–	0
Texas Mines		–		1	–	4	–	0
Wake Forest		–		2	–	8	–	0
Presbyterian		–		1	–	7	–	0

The 1921 Loyola Wolf Pack football team was an American football team that represented Loyola College of New Orleans (now known as Loyola University New Orleans) as an independent during the 1921 college football season. In its first season under head coach William Flynn, the team compiled a 2–4 record and was outscored by a total of 110 to 59.

== Schedule ==
Date	Opponent	Site	Result	Attendance	Source
October 7	St. Charles	New Orleans, LA	L 0–21		
October 15	at Spring Hill	Mobile, AL	L 7–28		
October 26	Jefferson (LA)	New Orleans, LA	W 27–7		
November 4	Southwestern Louisiana	New Orleans, LA	L 0–20		
November 15	at Saint Stanislaus (MS)	Bay Saint Louis, MS	L 0–21		
November 26	at Mississippi Normal	Hattiesburg, MS	W 25–13		
