= 1921 Marshall Thundering Herd football team =

American college football season

1921 Marshall Thundering Herd football
- Conference: Independent
- Record: 5–2–1
- Head coach: Skeeter Shelton (1st season)
- Captain: Isaac Pitsenberger
- Home stadium: Central Field

1921 Southern college football independents records
	Conf.			Overall
Team	W	L	T	W		L		T
Tennessee Docs		–		8	–	0	–	0
Southwest Texas State		–		7	–	0	–	0
Talladega		–		4	–	0	–	1
Navy		–		6	–	1	–	0
Sam Houston Normal		–		3	–	1	–	2
Erskine		–		6	–	2	–	0
Marshall		–		5	–	2	–	1
Delaware		–		5	–	4	–	0
West Virginia		–		5	–	4	–	1
Middle Tennessee State Normal		–		3	–	2	–	1
East Tennessee State Normal		–		4	–	3	–	0
Birmingham–Southern		–		4	–	4	–	1
Louisville		–		2	–	2	–	1
Marion		–		4	–	4	–	0
Spring Hill		–		4	–	4	–	0
West Tennessee State Normal		–		4	–	5	–	1
Mississippi Normal		–		3	–	4	–	0
Western Kentucky State Normal		–		2	–	4	–	1
Loyola (LA)		–		2	–	4	–	0
Roanoke		–		3	–	7	–	0
Abilene Christian		–		2	–	5	–	0
Bryson College		–		2	–	5	–	0
Stetson		–		1	–	4	–	0
Texas Mines		–		1	–	4	–	0
Wake Forest		–		2	–	8	–	0
Presbyterian		–		1	–	7	–	0

The 1921 Marshall Thundering Herd football team represented Marshall College (now Marshall University) as an independent during the 1921 college football season. Marshall posted a 5–2–1 record, outscoring its opposition 78–41. Home games were played on a campus field called "Central Field" which is presently Campus Commons.

== Schedule ==
Date	Opponent	Site	Result	Source
September 24	at Marietta	Marietta, OH	T 0–0	
September 30	at Salem	Salem, WV	W 6–0	
October 8	at Kentucky	Stoll Field; Lexington, KY	L 0–28	
October 15	Rio Grande	Central Field; Huntington, WV	W 33–3	
October 29	Transylvania	Central Field; Huntington, WV	W 13–0	
November 4	Broaddus	Central Field; Huntington, WV	W 13–3	
November 20	New River State	Central Field; Huntington, WV	L 0–21	
November 26	Louisville^{†}	Central Field; Huntington, WV	W 13–0	
^{†}Homecoming
