= 1921 West Tennessee State Normal football team =

American college football season

1921 West Tennessee State Normal football
- Conference: Independent
- Record: 4–5–1
- Head coach: Rollin Wilson (1st season)
- Captain: Griff Dodds
- Home stadium: Hodges Field

1921 Southern college football independents records
	Conf.			Overall
Team	W	L	T	W		L		T
Tennessee Docs		–		8	–	0	–	0
Southwest Texas State		–		7	–	0	–	0
Talladega		–		4	–	0	–	1
Navy		–		6	–	1	–	0
Sam Houston Normal		–		3	–	1	–	2
Erskine		–		6	–	2	–	0
Marshall		–		5	–	2	–	1
Delaware		–		5	–	4	–	0
West Virginia		–		5	–	4	–	1
Middle Tennessee State Normal		–		3	–	2	–	1
East Tennessee State Normal		–		4	–	3	–	0
Birmingham–Southern		–		4	–	4	–	1
Louisville		–		2	–	2	–	1
Marion		–		4	–	4	–	0
Spring Hill		–		4	–	4	–	0
West Tennessee State Normal		–		4	–	5	–	1
Mississippi Normal		–		3	–	4	–	0
Western Kentucky State Normal		–		2	–	4	–	1
Loyola (LA)		–		2	–	4	–	0
Roanoke		–		3	–	7	–	0
Abilene Christian		–		2	–	5	–	0
Bryson College		–		2	–	5	–	0
Stetson		–		1	–	4	–	0
Texas Mines		–		1	–	4	–	0
Wake Forest		–		2	–	8	–	0
Presbyterian		–		1	–	7	–	0

The 1921 West Tennessee State Normal football team was an American football team that represented West Tennessee State Normal School (now known as the University of Memphis) as an independent during the 1921 college football season. In their first season under head coach Rollin Wilson, West Tennessee State Normal compiled a 4–5–1 record.

== Schedule ==
Date	Time	Opponent	Site	Result	Source
October 1		at Ole Miss	Hemingway Stadium; Oxford, MS (rivalry)	L 0–82	
October 8	1:00 p.m.	Memphis University School	Hodges Field; Memphis, TN	L 0–32	
October 15	10:00 a.m.	Ford-Kilvington	Hodges Field; Memphis, TN	W 20–0	
October 28		at Union (TN)	Jackson, TN	L 7–28	
November 4	3:30 p.m.	Tech High School	Hodges Field; Memphis, TN	W 13–6	
November 11		at Jonesboro Aggies	Kays Field; Jonesboro, AR (rivalry)	L 0–19	
November 18		Christian Brothers	Memphis, TN	L 13–25	
November 21		at Wilson High School (AR)	Wilson, AR	W 14–0	
November 24		at Haywood High School	Brownsville, TN	W 12–7	
November 26		vs. Tennessee Docs reserves	Hodges Field; Memphis, TN	T 7–7	
All times are in Central time
