= Joe Utay =

American football player, coach, and administrator (1887–1977)

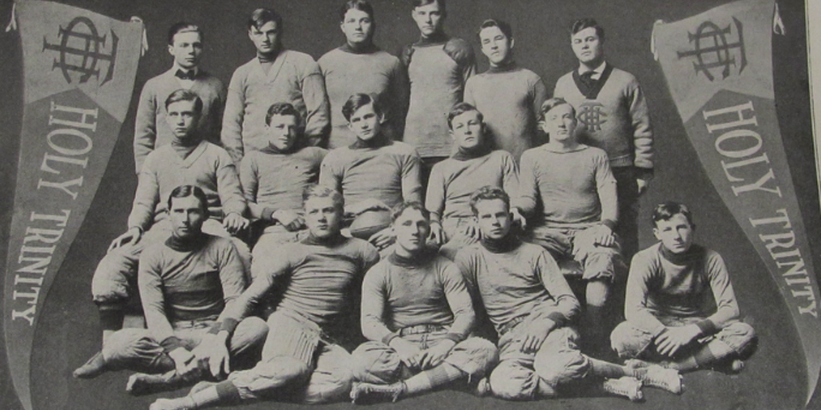
- 1909 Holy Trinity team; Utay at upper-right

Biographical details
- Born: May 2, 1887; St. Louis, Missouri, U.S.
- Died: November 24, 1977 (aged 90); Dallas, Texas, U.S.

Playing career
- 1905–1907: Texas A&M
- Position: Halfback

Coaching career (HC unless noted)
- 1908–1911: Holy Trinity / Dallas

Administrative career (AD unless noted)
- 1912–1913: Texas A&M

Head coaching record
- Overall: 15–7–1
- College Football Hall of Fame; Inducted in 1974 (profile)

Joseph Utay (May 2, 1887 – November 24, 1977) was an American college football player and coach, and an athletics administrator.

Utay played collegiately for Texas A&M. He subsequently coached Holy Trinity College, and led the 1909 Holy Trinity team to a 7–1–1 season and the championship of the North Texas Interscholastic Association. The teams he coached posted an aggregate 15–7–1 record.

In 1914, Utay helped found the Southwest Conference. During the 1920s and early 1930s, he organized and promoted the Dixie Classic.

Utay was elected to the College Football Hall of Fame in 1974. On November 4, 2012, Utay was inducted into the University of Dallas Athletics Hall of Fame.
