= 1921 Marion Cadets football team =

American college football season

1921 Marion Cadets football
- Conference: Independent
- Record: 4–4
- Head coach: Walter Hovater

1921 Southern college football independents records
	Conf.			Overall
Team	W	L	T	W		L		T
Tennessee Docs		–		8	–	0	–	0
Southwest Texas State		–		7	–	0	–	0
Talladega		–		4	–	0	–	1
Navy		–		6	–	1	–	0
Sam Houston Normal		–		3	–	1	–	2
Erskine		–		6	–	2	–	0
Marshall		–		5	–	2	–	1
Delaware		–		5	–	4	–	0
West Virginia		–		5	–	4	–	1
Middle Tennessee State Normal		–		3	–	2	–	1
East Tennessee State Normal		–		4	–	3	–	0
Birmingham–Southern		–		4	–	4	–	1
Louisville		–		2	–	2	–	1
Marion		–		4	–	4	–	0
Spring Hill		–		4	–	4	–	0
West Tennessee State Normal		–		4	–	5	–	1
Mississippi Normal		–		3	–	4	–	0
Western Kentucky State Normal		–		2	–	4	–	1
Loyola (LA)		–		2	–	4	–	0
Roanoke		–		3	–	7	–	0
Abilene Christian		–		2	–	5	–	0
Bryson College		–		2	–	5	–	0
Wake Forest		–		2	–	8	–	0
Texas Mines		–		1	–	4	–	0
Presbyterian		–		1	–	7	–	0

The 1921 Marion Cadets football team was an American football team that represented the Marion Military Institute as an independent during the 1921 college football season. The Cadets compiled an overall record of 4–4.

== Schedule ==
Date	Opponent	Site	Result	Attendance	Source
September 23	Wetumpka Aggies	Marion, AL	W 14–0		
October 9	at Alabama	Denny Field; Tuscaloosa, AL	L 0–55	2,000	
October 15	at Birmingham–Southern	Munger Field; Birmingham, AL	L 0–19		
October 22	Selma YMCA	Marion, AL	W 13–0		
October 28	at Spring Hill	Monroe Park; Mobile, AL	L 0–41		
November 5	vs. Howard (AL)	Gunter Park; Montgomery, AL	L 0–21		
November 11	Hamilton Aggies	Marion, AL	W 27–6		
November 26	at Selma YMCA	Robbins Field; Selma, AL	W 21–7		
