= 1921 Texas Mines Miners football team =

American college football season

1921 Texas Mines Miners football
- Conference: Independent
- Record: 1–4
- Head coach: Thomas C. Holliday (1st season)

1921 Southern college football independents records
	Conf.			Overall
Team	W	L	T	W		L		T
Tennessee Docs		–		8	–	0	–	0
Southwest Texas State		–		7	–	0	–	0
Talladega		–		4	–	0	–	1
Navy		–		6	–	1	–	0
Sam Houston Normal		–		3	–	1	–	2
Erskine		–		6	–	2	–	0
Marshall		–		5	–	2	–	1
Delaware		–		5	–	4	–	0
West Virginia		–		5	–	4	–	1
Middle Tennessee State Normal		–		3	–	2	–	1
East Tennessee State Normal		–		4	–	3	–	0
Birmingham–Southern		–		4	–	4	–	1
Louisville		–		2	–	2	–	1
Marion		–		4	–	4	–	0
Spring Hill		–		4	–	4	–	0
West Tennessee State Normal		–		4	–	5	–	1
Mississippi Normal		–		3	–	4	–	0
Western Kentucky State Normal		–		2	–	4	–	1
Loyola (LA)		–		2	–	4	–	0
Roanoke		–		3	–	7	–	0
Abilene Christian		–		2	–	5	–	0
Bryson College		–		2	–	5	–	0
Stetson		–		1	–	4	–	0
Texas Mines		–		1	–	4	–	0
Wake Forest		–		2	–	8	–	0
Presbyterian		–		1	–	7	–	0

The 1921 Texas Mines Miners football team was an American football team that represented the Texas School of Mines (now known as the University of Texas at El Paso) as an independent during the 1921 college football season. In its first and only season under head coach Thomas C. Holliday, the team compiled a 1–4 record and was outscored by a total of 142 to 21.

== Schedule ==
Date	Opponent	Site	Result	Source
October 21	Calumus Club	El Paso, TX	L 0–21	
October 29	at Arizona	Tucson, AZ	L 0–74	
November 11	New Mexico A&M	El Paso, TX (rivalry)	L 0–13	
November 19	at New Mexico Military	Roswell, NM	L 7–27	
November 24	Fort Bliss All-Stars	El Paso HS Stadium; El Paso, TX	W 14–7	
