= 1921 Navy Midshipmen football team =

American college football season

1921 Navy Midshipmen football
- Conference: Independent
- Record: 6–1
- Head coach: Bob Folwell (2nd season)
- Captain: Emery Lawson
- Home stadium: Worden Field

1921 Southern college football independents records
	Conf.			Overall
Team	W	L	T	W		L		T
Tennessee Docs		–		8	–	0	–	0
Southwest Texas State		–		7	–	0	–	0
Talladega		–		4	–	0	–	1
Navy		–		6	–	1	–	0
Sam Houston Normal		–		3	–	1	–	2
Erskine		–		6	–	2	–	0
Marshall		–		5	–	2	–	1
Delaware		–		5	–	4	–	0
West Virginia		–		5	–	4	–	1
Middle Tennessee State Normal		–		3	–	2	–	1
East Tennessee State Normal		–		4	–	3	–	0
Birmingham–Southern		–		4	–	4	–	1
Louisville		–		2	–	2	–	1
Marion		–		4	–	4	–	0
Spring Hill		–		4	–	4	–	0
West Tennessee State Normal		–		4	–	5	–	1
Mississippi Normal		–		3	–	4	–	0
Western Kentucky State Normal		–		2	–	4	–	1
Loyola (LA)		–		2	–	4	–	0
Roanoke		–		3	–	7	–	0
Abilene Christian		–		2	–	5	–	0
Bryson College		–		2	–	5	–	0
Stetson		–		1	–	4	–	0
Texas Mines		–		1	–	4	–	0
Wake Forest		–		2	–	8	–	0
Presbyterian		–		1	–	7	–	0

The 1921 Navy Midshipmen football team represented the United States Naval Academy during the 1921 college football season. In their second season under head coach Bob Folwell, the Midshipmen compiled a 6–1 record, shut out six opponents, and outscored all opponents by a combined score of 147–13.

The annual Army–Navy Game was played on November 26 at the Polo Grounds in New York City; Navy won 7–0.

== Schedule ==
Date	Opponent	Site	Result	Attendance	Source
October 1	NC State	Worden Field; Annapolis, MD	W 40–0		
October 8	Western Reserve	Worden Field; Annapolis, MD	W 53–0		
October 15	Princeton	Worden Field; Annapolis, MD	W 13–0		
October 29	Bethany (WV)	Worden Field; Annapolis, MD	W 21–0		
November 5	Bucknell	Worden Field; Annapolis, MD	W 6–0		
November 12	vs. Penn State	Franklin Field; Philadelphia, PA	L 7–13	25,000	
November 26	vs. Army	Polo Grounds; New York, NY (Army–Navy Game)	W 7–0	40,000	
