= 1921 Louisville Cardinals football team =

American college football season

1921 Louisville Cardinals football
- Conference: Independent
- Record: 2–2–1
- Head coach: Bill Duncan (1st season)
- Home stadium: Eclipse Park

1921 Southern college football independents records
	Conf.			Overall
Team	W	L	T	W		L		T
Tennessee Docs		–		8	–	0	–	0
Southwest Texas State		–		7	–	0	–	0
Talladega		–		4	–	0	–	1
Navy		–		6	–	1	–	0
Sam Houston Normal		–		3	–	1	–	2
Erskine		–		6	–	2	–	0
Marshall		–		5	–	2	–	1
Delaware		–		5	–	4	–	0
West Virginia		–		5	–	4	–	1
Middle Tennessee State Normal		–		3	–	2	–	1
East Tennessee State Normal		–		4	–	3	–	0
Birmingham–Southern		–		4	–	4	–	1
Louisville		–		2	–	2	–	1
Marion		–		4	–	4	–	0
Spring Hill		–		4	–	4	–	0
West Tennessee State Normal		–		4	–	5	–	1
Mississippi Normal		–		3	–	4	–	0
Western Kentucky State Normal		–		2	–	4	–	1
Loyola (LA)		–		2	–	4	–	0
Roanoke		–		3	–	7	–	0
Abilene Christian		–		2	–	5	–	0
Bryson College		–		2	–	5	–	0
Stetson		–		1	–	4	–	0
Texas Mines		–		1	–	4	–	0
Wake Forest		–		2	–	8	–	0
Presbyterian		–		1	–	7	–	0

The 1921 Louisville Cardinals football team was an American football team that represented the University of Louisville as an independent during the 1921 college football season. In their first season under head coach Bill Duncan, the Cardinals compiled a 2–2–1 record. The team played its home games at Eclipse Park in Louisville, Kentucky.

== Schedule ==
Date	Opponent	Site	Result	Source
October 22	Hanover	Eclipse Park; Louisville, KY	W 19–8	
October 29	at Bethel (KY)	Russellville, KY	T 0–0	
November 5	at Transylvania	Lexington, KY	L 0–7	
November 18	Kentucky Wesleyan	Eclipse Park; Louisville, KY	W 30–0	
November 26	at Marshall	Huntington, WV	L 0–14	
