= 1921 Delaware Fightin' Blue Hens football team =

American college football season

1921 Delaware Fightin' Blue Hens football
- Conference: Independent
- Record: 5–4
- Head coach: Sylvester Derby (1st season)
- Home stadium: Frazer Field

1921 Southern college football independents records
	Conf.			Overall
Team	W	L	T	W		L		T
Tennessee Docs		–		8	–	0	–	0
Southwest Texas State		–		7	–	0	–	0
Talladega		–		4	–	0	–	1
Navy		–		6	–	1	–	0
Sam Houston Normal		–		3	–	1	–	2
Erskine		–		6	–	2	–	0
Marshall		–		5	–	2	–	1
Delaware		–		5	–	4	–	0
West Virginia		–		5	–	4	–	1
Middle Tennessee State Normal		–		3	–	2	–	1
East Tennessee State Normal		–		4	–	3	–	0
Birmingham–Southern		–		4	–	4	–	1
Louisville		–		2	–	2	–	1
Marion		–		4	–	4	–	0
Spring Hill		–		4	–	4	–	0
West Tennessee State Normal		–		4	–	5	–	1
Mississippi Normal		–		3	–	4	–	0
Western Kentucky State Normal		–		2	–	4	–	1
Loyola (LA)		–		2	–	4	–	0
Roanoke		–		3	–	7	–	0
Abilene Christian		–		2	–	5	–	0
Bryson College		–		2	–	5	–	0
Stetson		–		1	–	4	–	0
Texas Mines		–		1	–	4	–	0
Wake Forest		–		2	–	8	–	0
Presbyterian		–		1	–	7	–	0

The 1921 Delaware Fightin' Blue Hens football team was an American football team that represented the University of Delaware in the 1921 college football season. In their first season under head coach Sylvester Derby, the Blue Hens compiled a 5–4 record but were outscored by a total of 187 to 163. The team played its home games at Frazer Field in Newark, Delaware.

== Schedule ==
Date	Opponent	Site	Result	Attendance	Source
September 24	at Penn	Franklin Field; Philadelphia, PA	L 0–89		
October 1	Muhlenberg	Frazer Field; Newark, DE	L 0–21		
October 8	at Johns Hopkins	Homewood Field; Baltimore, MD	L 0–27		
October 15	New York Aggies	Frazer Field; Newark, DE	W 49–0		
October 22	at Haverford	Haverford, PA	W 13–0		
October 29	Washington College	Frazer Field; Newark, DE	W 47–0		
November 5	Western Maryland	Frazer Field; Newark, DE	W 48–6		
November 12	at Lafayette	March Field; Easton, PA	L 0–44		
November 19	vs. Pennsylvania Military	Harlan Field; Wilmington, DE	W 6–0	5,000	
