= 1921 Sam Houston Normal Bear Cats football team =

American college football season

1921 Sam Houston Normal Bear Cats football
- Conference: Independent
- Record: 3–1–2
- Head coach: Mutt Gee (2nd season)
- Home stadium: Pritchett Field

1921 Southern college football independents records
| | Conf. | | | Overall |
| Team | W | L | T | W | | L | | T |
|---|---|---|---|---|---|---|---|---|
| Tennessee Docs | | – | | 8 | – | 0 | – | 0 |
| Southwest Texas State | | – | | 7 | – | 0 | – | 0 |
| Talladega | | – | | 4 | – | 0 | – | 1 |
| Navy | | – | | 6 | – | 1 | – | 0 |
| Sam Houston Normal | | – | | 3 | – | 1 | – | 2 |
| Erskine | | – | | 6 | – | 2 | – | 0 |
| Marshall | | – | | 5 | – | 2 | – | 1 |
| Delaware | | – | | 5 | – | 4 | – | 0 |
| West Virginia | | – | | 5 | – | 4 | – | 1 |
| Middle Tennessee State Normal | | – | | 3 | – | 2 | – | 1 |
| East Tennessee State Normal | | – | | 4 | – | 3 | – | 0 |
| Birmingham–Southern | | – | | 4 | – | 4 | – | 1 |
| Louisville | | – | | 2 | – | 2 | – | 1 |
| Marion | | – | | 4 | – | 4 | – | 0 |
| Spring Hill | | – | | 4 | – | 4 | – | 0 |
| West Tennessee State Normal | | – | | 4 | – | 5 | – | 1 |
| Mississippi Normal | | – | | 3 | – | 4 | – | 0 |
| Western Kentucky State Normal | | – | | 2 | – | 4 | – | 1 |
| Loyola (LA) | | – | | 2 | – | 4 | – | 0 |
| Roanoke | | – | | 3 | – | 7 | – | 0 |
| Abilene Christian | | – | | 2 | – | 5 | – | 0 |
| Bryson College | | – | | 2 | – | 5 | – | 0 |
| Stetson | | – | | 1 | – | 4 | – | 0 |
| Texas Mines | | – | | 1 | – | 4 | – | 0 |
| Wake Forest | | – | | 2 | – | 8 | – | 0 |
| Presbyterian | | – | | 1 | – | 7 | – | 0 |

The 1921 Sam Houston Normal Bear Cats football team represented Sam Houston Normal Institute (now known as Sam Houston State University) as an independent during the 1921 college football season. Led by second-year head coach Mutt Gee, Sam Houston compiled an overall record of 3–1–2.

== Schedule ==
| Date | Opponent | Site | Result | Source |
|---|---|---|---|---|
| October 7 | at Alexander Institute | Jacksonville, TX | T 6–6 | |
| October 14 | Allen Academy | Pritchett Field; Huntsville, TX | W 32–0 | |
| October 21 | Southwest Texas State | Pritchett Field; Huntsville, TX (rivalry) | L 13–14 | |
| November 3 | Ellington Field | Pritchett Field; Huntsville, TX | W 68–0 | |
| November 10 | Texas A&M Irregulars | Pritchett Field; Huntsville, TX | T 7–7 | |
| November 24 | at East Texas State | Commerce, TX | W 7–0 | |
