= 1921 Talladega football team =

American college football season

1921 Talladega football

Black college national co-champion
- Conference: Independent
- Head coach: Jubie Bragg (2nd season)

1921 Southern college football independents records
	Conf.			Overall
Team	W	L	T	W		L		T
Tennessee Docs		–		8	–	0	–	0
Southwest Texas State		–		7	–	0	–	0
Talladega		–		4	–	0	–	1
Navy		–		6	–	1	–	0
Sam Houston Normal		–		3	–	1	–	2
Erskine		–		6	–	2	–	0
Marshall		–		5	–	2	–	1
Delaware		–		5	–	4	–	0
West Virginia		–		5	–	4	–	1
Middle Tennessee State Normal		–		3	–	2	–	1
East Tennessee State Normal		–		4	–	3	–	0
Birmingham–Southern		–		4	–	4	–	1
Louisville		–		2	–	2	–	1
Marion		–		4	–	4	–	0
Spring Hill		–		4	–	4	–	0
West Tennessee State Normal		–		4	–	5	–	1
Mississippi Normal		–		3	–	4	–	0
Western Kentucky State Normal		–		2	–	4	–	1
Loyola (LA)		–		2	–	4	–	0
Roanoke		–		3	–	7	–	0
Abilene Christian		–		2	–	5	–	0
Bryson College		–		2	–	5	–	0
Stetson		–		1	–	4	–	0
Texas Mines		–		1	–	4	–	0
Wake Forest		–		2	–	8	–	0
Presbyterian		–		1	–	7	–	0

The 1921 Talladega football team was an American football team that represented the Talladega College during the 1921 college football season. In its second season under head coach Jubie Bragg, the team compiled a – record. Talladega was recognized as the 1921 black college national co-champion.

In November 1921, The Birmingham News reported that Talladega's quarterback "Skeats" Gordon was "reputed to have been showing dazzling ability all this year." Other players on the 1920 Talladega team included fullback Edwards from Anniston, halfback Spencer from Edgewater, and halfback Webber from King's Mountain, North Carolina.

Talladega College was and remains a historically black college located in Talladega, Alabama. Due to segregation, Talladega and other historically black colleges and universities played games among themselves. In 1920, the Pittsburgh Courier, an African-American weekly newspaper, began selecting national champions from the black college football teams. The Courier selected Talladega as the co-champion in both 1920 and 1921.

== Schedule ==
Date	Time	Opponent	Site	Result	Attendance	Source
October 14		Miles Memorial	Talladega, AL	W 22–0		
October 21		Morris Brown	Silby Athletic Field; Talladega, AL	W 23–13		
November 4	3:00 p.m.	vs. Tuskegee	Rickwood Field; Birmingham, AL	W 39–7	3,000	
November 19		at Florida A&M	Tallahassee, FL	W 3–0		
December 9	3:00 p.m.	at Wiley	Wiley Athletic Park; Marshall, TX	T 7–7		
All times are in Central time
