= 1921 East Tennessee State Normal football team =

American college football season

1921 East Tennessee State Normal football
- Conference: Independent
- Record: 2–3 (4–3 with non-countable games)
- Head coach: William R. Windes (2nd season)

1921 Southern college football independents records
	Conf.			Overall
Team	W	L	T	W		L		T
Tennessee Docs		–		8	–	0	–	0
Southwest Texas State		–		7	–	0	–	0
Talladega		–		4	–	0	–	1
Navy		–		6	–	1	–	0
Sam Houston Normal		–		3	–	1	–	2
Erskine		–		6	–	2	–	0
Marshall		–		5	–	2	–	1
Delaware		–		5	–	4	–	0
West Virginia		–		5	–	4	–	1
Middle Tennessee State Normal		–		3	–	2	–	1
East Tennessee State Normal		–		4	–	3	–	0
Birmingham–Southern		–		4	–	4	–	1
Louisville		–		2	–	2	–	1
Marion		–		4	–	4	–	0
Spring Hill		–		4	–	4	–	0
West Tennessee State Normal		–		4	–	5	–	1
Mississippi Normal		–		3	–	4	–	0
Western Kentucky State Normal		–		2	–	4	–	1
Loyola (LA)		–		2	–	4	–	0
Roanoke		–		3	–	7	–	0
Abilene Christian		–		2	–	5	–	0
Bryson College		–		2	–	5	–	0
Stetson		–		1	–	4	–	0
Texas Mines		–		1	–	4	–	0
Wake Forest		–		2	–	8	–	0
Presbyterian		–		1	–	7	–	0

The 1921 East Tennessee State Normal School football team was an American football team that represented East Tennessee State Normal School—now known as East Tennessee State University (ETSU)—as an independent in the 1921 college football season. They were led by William R. Windes, in his second and final season as head coach. He was assisted by English professor Willis Beeler "Bull" Bible, brother of Dana X. Bible and by fellow teacher A. V. McFee. In the 1921 season, the team was much improved on the playing field against much better competition with only one game against high school competition. The team also played against the Johnson City All-Stars, composed of former high school and college players. Windes finished his coaching tenure at the school with a 7–5 record.

== Schedule ==
Date	Time	Opponent	Site	Result	Source
October 1	2:15 p.m.	Tusculum	Normal School grounds; Johnson City, TN	W 20–0	
October 8		at Carson–Newman	Jefferson City, TN	L 0–46	
		Johnson City All-Stars		W 14–7	
		Washington College		W 42–0	
November 5		at King	Bristol, TN	L 7–42	
November 11		Milligan	Johnson City, TN	W 12–6	
November 18		King	Normal School grounds; Johnson City, TN	L 0–35	
