= 1921 Erskine Seceders football team =

American college football season

1921 Erskine Seceders football
- Conference: Independent
- Record: 6–2
- Head coach: David W. Parrish (2nd season)
- Captain: Dode Phillips

1921 Southern college football independents records
	Conf.			Overall
Team	W	L	T	W		L		T
Tennessee Docs		–		8	–	0	–	0
Southwest Texas State		–		7	–	0	–	0
Talladega		–		4	–	0	–	1
Navy		–		6	–	1	–	0
Sam Houston Normal		–		3	–	1	–	2
Erskine		–		6	–	2	–	0
Marshall		–		5	–	2	–	1
Delaware		–		5	–	4	–	0
West Virginia		–		5	–	4	–	1
Middle Tennessee State Normal		–		3	–	2	–	1
East Tennessee State Normal		–		4	–	3	–	0
Birmingham–Southern		–		4	–	4	–	1
Louisville		–		2	–	2	–	1
Marion		–		4	–	4	–	0
Spring Hill		–		4	–	4	–	0
West Tennessee State Normal		–		4	–	5	–	1
Mississippi Normal		–		3	–	4	–	0
Western Kentucky State Normal		–		2	–	4	–	1
Loyola (LA)		–		2	–	4	–	0
Roanoke		–		3	–	7	–	0
Abilene Christian		–		2	–	5	–	0
Bryson College		–		2	–	5	–	0
Stetson		–		1	–	4	–	0
Texas Mines		–		1	–	4	–	0
Wake Forest		–		2	–	8	–	0
Presbyterian		–		1	–	7	–	0

The 1921 Erskine Seceders football team represented Erskine College as an independent during the 1921 college football season. Led by second year head coach David W. Parrish, the Seceders compiled an overall record of 6–2.

== Schedule ==
Date	Opponent	Site	Result	Attendance	Source
September 24	at Furman	Manly Field; Greenville, SC	L 7–42	2,200	
October 1	South Carolina	University Field; Columbia, SC	L 7–13		
October 14	Charleston	Due West, SC	W 74–0		
October 22	at The Citadel	College Park Stadium; Charleston, SC	W 13–6		
October 29	at Presbyterian	Athletic Field; Clinton, SC	W 21–7		
November 3	at Wofford	Spartanburg County Fairgrounds; Spartanburg, SC	W 19–6		
November 11	Newberry	Due West, SC	W 18–13		
November 18	at Clemson	Riggs Field; Calhoun, SC	W 13–0		
