= Thomas C. Holliday =

American football player and coach (1890–1940)

Biographical details
- Born: June 28, 1890; Victoria, Texas, U.S.
- Died: September 7, 1940 (aged 50); Fauquier County, Virginia, U.S.

Playing career
- 1911: Texas A&M
- Positions: Fullback, halfback

Coaching career (HC unless noted)
- 1921: Texas Mines
- ?: Texas School for the Deaf

Head coaching record
- Overall: 1–4 (college)

Thomas Cromwell Holliday (June 28, 1890 – September 7, 1940), sometimes spelled Holiday, was an American football player and coach. He played college football at the fullback and halfback positions for four years at Texas A&M College. After graduating, he served as the head football coach at the Texas School for the Deaf and Dumb in Austin, Texas. During World War I, he served as an aviator in France. In 1921, he was the head football coach at the Texas School of Mines (now known as the University of Texas at El Paso), leading the 1921 Texas Mines Miners football team to a 1–4 record. In December 1921, Holliday announced that he would be unable to coach the team in 1922. He was married to Josephine Nations Morfit in February 1922. He later worked as a general agent for Aetna.

== Head coaching record ==
=== College ===
Year	Team	Overall	Conference	Standing	Bowl/playoffs
Texas Mines Miners (Independent) (1920)
1921	Texas Mines	1–4			
Texas Mines:		1–4			
Total:		1–4			
