= 1921 Middle Tennessee State Normal football team =

American college football season

1921 Middle Tennessee State Normal football
- Conference: Independent
- Record: 3–2–1
- Head coach: Alfred B. Miles (7th season)
- Captain: Boots Ridley

1921 Southern college football independents records
| | Conf. | | | Overall |
| Team | W | L | T | W | | L | | T |
|---|---|---|---|---|---|---|---|---|
| Tennessee Docs | | – | | 8 | – | 0 | – | 0 |
| Southwest Texas State | | – | | 7 | – | 0 | – | 0 |
| Talladega | | – | | 4 | – | 0 | – | 1 |
| Navy | | – | | 6 | – | 1 | – | 0 |
| Sam Houston Normal | | – | | 3 | – | 1 | – | 2 |
| Erskine | | – | | 6 | – | 2 | – | 0 |
| Marshall | | – | | 5 | – | 2 | – | 1 |
| Delaware | | – | | 5 | – | 4 | – | 0 |
| West Virginia | | – | | 5 | – | 4 | – | 1 |
| Middle Tennessee State Normal | | – | | 3 | – | 2 | – | 1 |
| East Tennessee State Normal | | – | | 4 | – | 3 | – | 0 |
| Birmingham–Southern | | – | | 4 | – | 4 | – | 1 |
| Louisville | | – | | 2 | – | 2 | – | 1 |
| Marion | | – | | 4 | – | 4 | – | 0 |
| Spring Hill | | – | | 4 | – | 4 | – | 0 |
| West Tennessee State Normal | | – | | 4 | – | 5 | – | 1 |
| Mississippi Normal | | – | | 3 | – | 4 | – | 0 |
| Western Kentucky State Normal | | – | | 2 | – | 4 | – | 1 |
| Loyola (LA) | | – | | 2 | – | 4 | – | 0 |
| Roanoke | | – | | 3 | – | 7 | – | 0 |
| Abilene Christian | | – | | 2 | – | 5 | – | 0 |
| Bryson College | | – | | 2 | – | 5 | – | 0 |
| Stetson | | – | | 1 | – | 4 | – | 0 |
| Texas Mines | | – | | 1 | – | 4 | – | 0 |
| Wake Forest | | – | | 2 | – | 8 | – | 0 |
| Presbyterian | | – | | 1 | – | 7 | – | 0 |

The 1921 Middle Tennessee State Normal football team represented the Middle Tennessee State Normal School (now known as Middle Tennessee State University) during the 1921 college football season. The team captain was Boots Ridley.

== Schedule ==
| Date | Opponent | Site | Result | Source |
|---|---|---|---|---|
| October 1 | Vanderbilt | Dudley Field; Nashville, TN | L 0–34 | |
| | Sewanee JV | Murfreesboro, TN | W 7–0 | |
| | Vanderbilt JV | Murfreesboro, TN | W 14–13 | |
| October 24 | at Tennessee Docs | Hodges Field; Memphis, TN | L 0–20 | |
| November 11 | Western Kentucky State Normal | Murfreesboro, TN (rivalry) | W 15–7 | |
| November 25 | at Union (TN) | Jackson, TN | T 0–0 | |
