= 1921 Presbyterian Blue Hose football team =

American college football season

1921 Presbyterian Blue Hose football
- Conference: Independent
- Record: 1–7
- Head coach: Walter A. Johnson (6th season)
- Captain: Marion Durant

1921 Southern college football independents records
	Conf.			Overall
Team	W	L	T	W		L		T
Tennessee Docs		–		8	–	0	–	0
Southwest Texas State		–		7	–	0	–	0
Talladega		–		4	–	0	–	1
Navy		–		6	–	1	–	0
Sam Houston Normal		–		3	–	1	–	2
Erskine		–		6	–	2	–	0
Marshall		–		5	–	2	–	1
Delaware		–		5	–	4	–	0
West Virginia		–		5	–	4	–	1
Middle Tennessee State Normal		–		3	–	2	–	1
East Tennessee State Normal		–		4	–	3	–	0
Birmingham–Southern		–		4	–	4	–	1
Louisville		–		2	–	2	–	1
Marion		–		4	–	4	–	0
Spring Hill		–		4	–	4	–	0
West Tennessee State Normal		–		4	–	5	–	1
Mississippi Normal		–		3	–	4	–	0
Western Kentucky State Normal		–		2	–	4	–	1
Loyola (LA)		–		2	–	4	–	0
Roanoke		–		3	–	7	–	0
Abilene Christian		–		2	–	5	–	0
Bryson College		–		2	–	5	–	0
Stetson		–		1	–	4	–	0
Texas Mines		–		1	–	4	–	0
Wake Forest		–		2	–	8	–	0
Presbyterian		–		1	–	7	–	0

The 1921 Presbyterian Blue Hose football team represented Presbyterian College as an independent during the 1921 college football season. Led by the sixth-year head coach Walter A. Johnson, Presbyterian compiled a record of 1–7. The team captain was Marion Durant.

== Schedule ==
Date	Opponent	Site	Result	Source
September 30	at Davidson	Sprunt Field; Davidson, NC	L 0–7	
October 7	at Clemson	Riggs Field; Clemson, SC	L 0–34	
October 15	The Citadel	Athletic Field; Clinton, SC	L 0–20	
October 22	at South Carolina	University Field; Columbia, SC	L 0–48	
October 29	Erskine	Clinton, SC	L 7–19	
November 5	at Fort Benning	Columbus, GA	L 0–27	
November 12	Wofford	Clinton, SC	W 27–0	
November 19	at Newberry	Newberry, SC	L 7–16	
