= 1921 Western Kentucky State Normal football team =

American college football season

1921 Western Kentucky State Normal football
- Conference: Independent
- Record: 2–4–1
- Head coach: L. T. Smith (2nd season)

1921 Southern college football independents records
	Conf.			Overall
Team	W	L	T	W		L		T
Tennessee Docs		–		8	–	0	–	0
Southwest Texas State		–		7	–	0	–	0
Talladega		–		4	–	0	–	1
Navy		–		6	–	1	–	0
Sam Houston Normal		–		3	–	1	–	2
Erskine		–		6	–	2	–	0
Marshall		–		5	–	2	–	1
Delaware		–		5	–	4	–	0
West Virginia		–		5	–	4	–	1
Middle Tennessee State Normal		–		3	–	2	–	1
East Tennessee State Normal		–		4	–	3	–	0
Birmingham–Southern		–		4	–	4	–	1
Louisville		–		2	–	2	–	1
Marion		–		4	–	4	–	0
Spring Hill		–		4	–	4	–	0
West Tennessee State Normal		–		4	–	5	–	1
Mississippi Normal		–		3	–	4	–	0
Western Kentucky State Normal		–		2	–	4	–	1
Loyola (LA)		–		2	–	4	–	0
Roanoke		–		3	–	7	–	0
Abilene Christian		–		2	–	5	–	0
Bryson College		–		2	–	5	–	0
Stetson		–		1	–	4	–	0
Texas Mines		–		1	–	4	–	0
Wake Forest		–		2	–	8	–	0
Presbyterian		–		1	–	7	–	0

The 1921 Western Kentucky State Normal football team represented Western Kentucky State Normal School (now known as Western Kentucky University) as an independent during the 1921 college football season. They were led by head coach L. T. Smith.

== Schedule ==
Date	Opponent	Site	Result
October 1	Union (KY)	Bowling Green, KY	L 0–30
October 8	Bethel (KY)	Bowling Green, KY	L 0–26
October 22	Vanderbilt B	Bowling Green, KY	L 0–12
November 5	Eastern Kentucky	Bowling Green, KY (rivalry)	W 21–0
November 11	at Middle Tennessee State Normal	Murfreesboro, TN (rivalry)	L 7–15
November 18	at Bethel (KY)	Russellville, KY	T 7–7
November 24	Southern Presbyterian	Bowling Green, KY	W 12–0
