= 1921 Mississippi Normal Normalites football team =

American college football season

1921 Mississippi Normal Normalites football
- Conference: Independent
- Record: 3–4
- Head coach: O. V. Austin (1st season)
- Home stadium: Kamper Park

1921 Southern college football independents records
	Conf.			Overall
Team	W	L	T	W		L		T
Tennessee Docs		–		8	–	0	–	0
Southwest Texas State		–		7	–	0	–	0
Talladega		–		4	–	0	–	1
Navy		–		6	–	1	–	0
Sam Houston Normal		–		3	–	1	–	2
Erskine		–		6	–	2	–	0
Marshall		–		5	–	2	–	1
Delaware		–		5	–	4	–	0
West Virginia		–		5	–	4	–	1
Middle Tennessee State Normal		–		3	–	2	–	1
East Tennessee State Normal		–		4	–	3	–	0
Birmingham–Southern		–		4	–	4	–	1
Louisville		–		2	–	2	–	1
Marion		–		4	–	4	–	0
Spring Hill		–		4	–	4	–	0
West Tennessee State Normal		–		4	–	5	–	1
Mississippi Normal		–		3	–	4	–	0
Western Kentucky State Normal		–		2	–	4	–	1
Loyola (LA)		–		2	–	4	–	0
Roanoke		–		3	–	7	–	0
Abilene Christian		–		2	–	5	–	0
Bryson College		–		2	–	5	–	0
Stetson		–		1	–	4	–	0
Texas Mines		–		1	–	4	–	0
Wake Forest		–		2	–	8	–	0
Presbyterian		–		1	–	7	–	0

The 1921 Mississippi Normal Normalites football team was an American football team that represented Mississippi Normal College (now known as the University of Southern Mississippi) as an independent during the 1921 college football season. In their first year under head coach O. V. Austin, the team compiled a 3–4 record.

== Schedule ==
Date	Opponent	Site	Result	Source
October 7	at Ellisville High School	Ellisville, MS	W 20–0	
October 15	Smith County High School	Kamper Park; Hattiesburg, MS	W 113–0	
October 21	at Millsaps	Athletic Park; Jackson, MS	L 0–27	
October 29	Jones County High School	Kamper Park; Hattiesburg, MS	W 37–0	
November 5	at Saint Stanislaus College	Bay St. Louis, MS	L 0–49	
November 11	Poplarville High School	Kamper Park; Hattiesburg, MS	L 0–40	
November 26	Loyola (LA)	Kamper Park; Hattiesburg, MS	L 13–25	
