= 1921 Birmingham–Southern Panthers football team =

American college football season

1921 Birmingham–Southern Panthers football
- Conference: Independent
- Record: 4–4–1
- Head coach: Charles H. Brown (3rd season)
- Home stadium: Rickwood Field; Munger Field

1921 Southern college football independents records
| | Conf. | | | Overall |
| Team | W | L | T | W | | L | | T |
|---|---|---|---|---|---|---|---|---|
| Tennessee Docs | | – | | 8 | – | 0 | – | 0 |
| Southwest Texas State | | – | | 7 | – | 0 | – | 0 |
| Talladega | | – | | 4 | – | 0 | – | 1 |
| Navy | | – | | 6 | – | 1 | – | 0 |
| Sam Houston Normal | | – | | 3 | – | 1 | – | 2 |
| Erskine | | – | | 6 | – | 2 | – | 0 |
| Marshall | | – | | 5 | – | 2 | – | 1 |
| Delaware | | – | | 5 | – | 4 | – | 0 |
| West Virginia | | – | | 5 | – | 4 | – | 1 |
| Middle Tennessee State Normal | | – | | 3 | – | 2 | – | 1 |
| East Tennessee State Normal | | – | | 4 | – | 3 | – | 0 |
| Birmingham–Southern | | – | | 4 | – | 4 | – | 1 |
| Louisville | | – | | 2 | – | 2 | – | 1 |
| Marion | | – | | 4 | – | 4 | – | 0 |
| Spring Hill | | – | | 4 | – | 4 | – | 0 |
| West Tennessee State Normal | | – | | 4 | – | 5 | – | 1 |
| Mississippi Normal | | – | | 3 | – | 4 | – | 0 |
| Western Kentucky State Normal | | – | | 2 | – | 4 | – | 1 |
| Loyola (LA) | | – | | 2 | – | 4 | – | 0 |
| Roanoke | | – | | 3 | – | 7 | – | 0 |
| Abilene Christian | | – | | 2 | – | 5 | – | 0 |
| Bryson College | | – | | 2 | – | 5 | – | 0 |
| Stetson | | – | | 1 | – | 4 | – | 0 |
| Texas Mines | | – | | 1 | – | 4 | – | 0 |
| Wake Forest | | – | | 2 | – | 8 | – | 0 |
| Presbyterian | | – | | 1 | – | 7 | – | 0 |

The 1921 Birmingham–Southern Panthers football team was an American football team that represented Birmingham–Southern College as an independent during the 1921 college football season. In their third season under head coach Charles H. Brown, the team compiled a 4–4–1 record.

== Schedule ==
| Date | Opponent | Site | Result | Source |
|---|---|---|---|---|
| September 30 | at Mississippi A&M | Scott Field; Starkville, MS | L 7–20 | |
| October 8 | Southwestern Presbyterian | Munger Field; Birmingham, AL | W 38–6 | |
| October 15 | Marion | Munger Field; Birmingham, AL | W 19–0 | |
| October 21 | at Mercer | Alumni Field; Macon, GA | L 0–20 | |
| October 29 | Mississippi College | Rickwood Field; Birmingham, AL | L 6–27 | |
| November 4 | at Millsaps | State Fairgrounds; Jackson, MS | T 7–7 | |
| November 11 | Chattanooga | Rickwood Field; Birmingham, AL | W 14–7 | |
| November 20 | vs. Howard (AL) | Rickwood Field; Birmingham, AL | W 16–14 | |
| November 24 | vs. Rollins | Plant Field; Tampa, FL | L 0–3 | |
