= 1921 West Virginia Mountaineers football team =

American college football season

1921 West Virginia Mountaineers football
- Conference: Independent
- Record: 5–4–1
- Head coach: Clarence Spears (1st season)
- Captain: Robert H. C. Kay

1921 Southern college football independents records
	Conf.			Overall
Team	W	L	T	W		L		T
Tennessee Docs		–		8	–	0	–	0
Southwest Texas State		–		7	–	0	–	0
Talladega		–		4	–	0	–	1
Navy		–		6	–	1	–	0
Sam Houston Normal		–		3	–	1	–	2
Erskine		–		6	–	2	–	0
Marshall		–		5	–	2	–	1
Delaware		–		5	–	4	–	0
West Virginia		–		5	–	4	–	1
Middle Tennessee State Normal		–		3	–	2	–	1
East Tennessee State Normal		–		4	–	3	–	0
Birmingham–Southern		–		4	–	4	–	1
Louisville		–		2	–	2	–	1
Marion		–		4	–	4	–	0
Spring Hill		–		4	–	4	–	0
West Tennessee State Normal		–		4	–	5	–	1
Mississippi Normal		–		3	–	4	–	0
Western Kentucky State Normal		–		2	–	4	–	1
Loyola (LA)		–		2	–	4	–	0
Roanoke		–		3	–	7	–	0
Abilene Christian		–		2	–	5	–	0
Bryson College		–		2	–	5	–	0
Stetson		–		1	–	4	–	0
Texas Mines		–		1	–	4	–	0
Wake Forest		–		2	–	8	–	0
Presbyterian		–		1	–	7	–	0

The 1921 West Virginia Mountaineers football team was an American football team that represented West Virginia University as an independent during the 1921 college football season. In its first season under head coach Clarence Spears, the team compiled a 5–4–1 record and outscored opponents by a total of 158 to 82.

== Schedule ==
Date	Opponent	Site	Result	Attendance	Source
September 24	vs. West Virginia Wesleyan	South Side Park; Fairmont, WV	W 34–3		
October 1	Cincinnati	Athletic Field; Morgantown, WV	W 50–0		
October 8	at Pittsburgh	Forbes Field; Pittsburgh, PA (rivalry)	L 13–21	18,000	
October 15	Ohio	Athletic Field; Morgantown, WV	W 7–0		
October 22	Bucknell	Athletic Field; Morgantown, WV	T 0–0		
October 29	at Lehigh	Taylor Stadium; Bethlehem, PA	L 14–21		
November 5	vs. Washington and Lee	Laidley Field; Charleston, WV	W 28–7		
November 12	at Virginia	Lambeth Field; Charlottesville, VA	W 7–0		
November 19	at Rutgers	Neilson Field; New Brunswick, NJ	L 7–17		
November 24	Washington & Jefferson^{†}	Athletic Field; Morgantown, WV	L 0–13		
^{†}Homecoming
