= 1921 Roanoke Maroons football team =

American college football season

1921 Roanoke Maroons football
- Conference: Independent
- Record: 3–7
- Head coach: Pinky Spruhan (8th season)
- Home stadium: College Field

1921 Southern college football independents records
	Conf.			Overall
Team	W	L	T	W		L		T
Tennessee Docs		–		8	–	0	–	0
Southwest Texas State		–		7	–	0	–	0
Talladega		–		4	–	0	–	1
Navy		–		6	–	1	–	0
Sam Houston Normal		–		3	–	1	–	2
Erskine		–		6	–	2	–	0
Marshall		–		5	–	2	–	1
Delaware		–		5	–	4	–	0
West Virginia		–		5	–	4	–	1
Middle Tennessee State Normal		–		3	–	2	–	1
East Tennessee State Normal		–		4	–	3	–	0
Birmingham–Southern		–		4	–	4	–	1
Louisville		–		2	–	2	–	1
Marion		–		4	–	4	–	0
Spring Hill		–		4	–	4	–	0
West Tennessee State Normal		–		4	–	5	–	1
Mississippi Normal		–		3	–	4	–	0
Western Kentucky State Normal		–		2	–	4	–	1
Loyola (LA)		–		2	–	4	–	0
Roanoke		–		3	–	7	–	0
Abilene Christian		–		2	–	5	–	0
Bryson College		–		2	–	5	–	0
Stetson		–		1	–	4	–	0
Texas Mines		–		1	–	4	–	0
Wake Forest		–		2	–	8	–	0
Presbyterian		–		1	–	7	–	0

The 1921 Roanoke Maroons football team represented Roanoke College as an independent during the 1921 college football season. Led by eighth-year head coach Pinky Spruhan, the Maroons compiled an overall record of 3–7.

== Schedule ==
Date	Opponent	Site	Result	Source
September 24	at VMI	Alumni Field; Lexington, VA	L 0–13	
October 1	Guilford	College Field; Salem, VA	W 14–0	
October 8	Randolph-Macon Academy	College Field; Salem, VA	W 41–0	
October 15	Hampden–Sydney	Fair Grounds; Roanoke, VA	L 6–14	
October 22	vs. Maryville (TN)	Fair Grounds; Bluefield, WV	L 0–16	
October 29	at King (TN)	Tenneva Field; Bristol, TN	L 0–7	
November 5	Emory and Henry	College Field; Salem, VA	W 33–14	
November 12	at Washington and Lee	Wilson Field; Lexington, VA	L 0–41	
November 19	at VPI	Miles Field; Blacksburg, VA	L 0–35	
November 24	at Lynchburg	Fair Grounds; Lynchburg, VA	L 7–8	
