= Rollin Wilson =

American football player and coach (1899–1953)

Biographical details
- Born: March 21, 1899; Memphis, Tennessee, U.S.
- Died: November 13, 1953 (aged 54); Memphis, Tennessee, U.S.

Playing career
- 1914–1917: West Tennessee State Normal
- 1919: West Tennessee State Normal
- 1922: Tennessee
- 1924: Tennessee
- Position: Halfback

Coaching career (HC unless noted)
- 1921: West Tennessee State Normal

Head coaching record
- Overall: 4–5–1

Rollin Virginius Wilson Sr. (March 21, 1899 – November 13, 1953) was an American college football player and coach. He served as the head football coach at West Tennessee Normal School—now known as the University of Memphis–in 1921, compiling a record of 4–5–1.

Wilson died on November 13, 1953, at Baptist Hospital in Memphis, Tennessee.

== Head coaching record ==
Year	Team	Overall	Conference	Standing	Bowl/playoffs
West Tennessee State Normal (Independent) (1922)
1921	West Tennessee State Normal	4–5–1			
West Tennessee State Normal:		4–5–1			
Total:		4–5–1			
