= Burleson College =

Burleson College was a private Southern Baptist college located in Greenville, Texas. It was founded in 1895 by the Hunt County Baptist Association. The school closed in December 1930 after suffering from financial difficulty.

Burleson College's colors were blue and white. The school sports teams were first known as the Blue and White and later as the Bruins.
