= Bryson College =

Defunct college in Tennessee, United States

Bryson College was a college in Fayetteville, Tennessee founded in 1919 and closed in 1929.
