= Clark Field (Fort Worth, Texas) =

Stadium in Fort Worth, Texas

- Location: Fort Worth, Texas, U.S.
- Owner: Texas Christian University
- Operator: Texas Christian University
- Capacity: 7,500 (1924); 25,000 (1929)

Construction
- Opened: 1924
- Cost: $40,000

Tenant
- TCU Horned Frogs football (1924–1930)

Clark Field was a stadium located on the campus of Texas Christian University in Fort Worth, Texas, United States. It served the as the home venue for the TCU Horned Frogs football team from 1924 until October 1930, when Amon G. Carter Stadium opened. Prior to 1924, TCU hosted its football games at Panther Park. TCU played its first game at Clark Field on September 26, 1924, beating East Texas State. The field was dedicated two weeks later, on October 11, when TCU defeated Oklahoma A&M. Clark Field was initially referred to as "University Stadium", "Frogland Stadium", and "the new playing field'. It was constructed at a cost of $40,000 and opened with a seating capacity of 7,500. Seating was later added, expanding the capacity to 25,000 by 1929. TCU also hosted track and field events at Clark Field beginning in the spring of 1925.
