= 1921 Centre Praying Colonels football team =

American college football season

1921 Centre Praying Colonels football
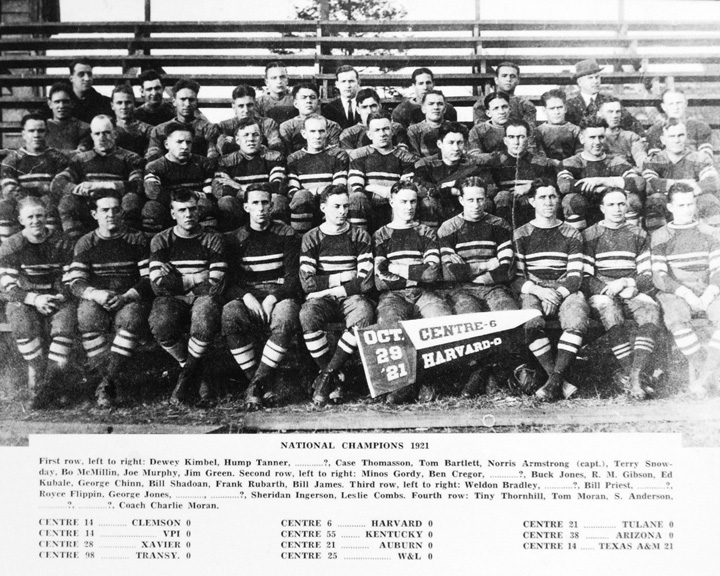

Southern champion SIAA co-champion East-West Christmas Classic champion

East-West Christmas Classic, W 38–0 vs. Arizona; Dixie Classic, L 14–22 vs. Texas A&M
- Conference: Southern Intercollegiate Athletic Association
- Record: 10–1 (5–0 SIAA)
- Head coach: Charley Moran (5th season)
- Offensive scheme: Single-wing
- Captain: Norris Armstrong
- Home stadium: Cheek Field

Uniform
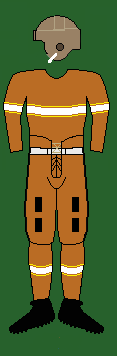

1921 Southern Intercollegiate Athletic Association football standings
	Conf.					Overall
Team	W		L		T	W		L		T
Centre +	5	–	0	–	0	10	–	1	–	0
Georgia +	6	–	0	–	1	7	–	2	–	1
Georgia Tech +	5	–	0	–	0	8	–	1	–	0
Vanderbilt +	5	–	0	–	1	7	–	0	–	1
Tennessee	4	–	1	–	1	6	–	2	–	1
Florida	4	–	1	–	2	6	–	3	–	2
Mississippi College	3	–	1	–	1	7	–	2	–	1
Sewanee	4	–	2	–	0	6	–	2	–	0
Transylvania	2	–	1	–	0	4	–	4	–	0
LSU	2	–	1	–	1	6	–	1	–	1
South Carolina	2	–	1	–	1	5	–	1	–	2
Furman	4	–	2	–	1	7	–	2	–	1
Auburn	3	–	2	–	0	5	–	3	–	0
Mississippi A&M	2	–	3	–	1	4	–	4	–	1
Tulane	3	–	4	–	0	4	–	6	–	0
Alabama	2	–	4	–	2	5	–	4	–	2
Oglethorpe	2	–	4	–	0	5	–	4	–	0
Chattanooga	2	–	4	–	0	4	–	6	–	0
The Citadel	1	–	2	–	1	3	–	3	–	2
Kentucky	1	–	3	–	1	4	–	3	–	1
Ole Miss	1	–	4	–	0	3	–	6	–	0
Howard (AL)	1	–	4	–	0	3	–	6	–	0
Mercer	1	–	5	–	0	3	–	6	–	0
Louisville	0	–	1	–	0	2	–	2	–	1
Wofford	0	–	2	–	0	2	–	7	–	0
Georgetown (KY)	0	–	3	–	0	2	–	6	–	0
Millsaps	0	–	3	–	0	1	–	5	–	1
Clemson	0	–	5	–	2	1	–	6	–	2
+ – Conference co-champions

The 1921 Centre Praying Colonels football team represented Centre College of Danville, Kentucky, in the 1921 college football season. Led by coach Charley Moran, the Praying Colonels compiled a 10–1 record, scoring 334 points while allowing 28 points (282 and 6 in regular season play).

The Colonels' victory in its game versus Harvard is regarded as one of the greatest upsets in college football history. Centre also played in two postseason bowl games after the season. The Colonels defeated Arizona 38–0 in the San Diego East-West Christmas Classic before losing to Texas A&M in an upset in the 1922 Dixie Classic (a precursor to the modern Cotton Bowl Classic), the game which originated the Aggies' "12th Man" tradition.

The Colonels' team captain was Norris Armstrong.

Several centre players received postseason recognition. End Red Roberts was a first-team Walter Camp All-America selection, a rarity for a player in the South, and quarterback Bo McMillin made Camp's second team and was recognized as a consensus All-American. McMillin was an inaugural inductee into the College Football Hall of Fame.

== Schedule ==
Date	Opponent	Site	Result	Attendance	Source
October 1	Clemson	Cheek Field; Danville, KY	W 14–0	3,000	
October 8	VPI*	Cheek Field; Danville, KY	W 14–0		
October 15	at St. Xavier*	Corcoran Field; Cincinnati, OH	W 28–6		
October 22	at Transylvania	Thomas Field; Lexington, KY	W 98–0		
October 29	at Harvard*	Harvard Stadium; Boston, MA	W 6–0	43,000	
November 5	Kentucky	Cheek Field; Danville, KY (rivalry)	W 55–0	8,000	
November 12	at Auburn	Rickwood Field; Birmingham, AL	W 21–0		
November 19	vs. Washington and Lee*	Eclipse Park; Louisville, KY	W 25–0		
November 24	at Tulane	Tulane Stadium; New Orleans, LA	W 21–0	8,000	
December 26	vs. Arizona*	Balboa Stadium; San Diego, CA (Christmas Classic)	W 38–0		
January 2, 1922	vs. Texas A&M*	Fair Park Stadium; Dallas, TX (Dixie Classic)	L 14–22	20,000	
*Non-conference game

== Before the season ==
Centre College is a small college in Danville, Kentucky. From 1917 to 1924, Centre compiled a 57–8 record while playing against some of the best teams in the nation. The 1919 team first brought the Praying Colonels to national attention. In 1921, the school's student body numbered just 274.

The Colonels had closed the 1920 season by convincingly routing Texas Christian (TCU) in the Fort Worth Classic, 63–7. This season they started their schedule with much stronger competition than the previous year. Several publications relay: "In 1920, the slogan of Centre College was 'Score' ... In 1921 Centre changed the 'Score' slogan to 'Hold 'Em'."

Coach Charley Moran used a single wing system like his former mentor Pop Warner. Tiny Thornill, a former Pitt star under Warner, and future Stanford head coach, assisted as line coach.

In 1921, football used a one-platoon system, with players featuring on both offense, defense, and special teams. Center Red Weaver, who had posted record numbers for placekicking extra points, graduated and was replaced with Ed Kubale.

== Game summaries ==
=== Week 1: Clemson ===
Week 1: Clemson at Centre

Team	1	2	3	4	Total
Clemson	0	0	0	0	0
• Centre	0	7	7	0	14

- Date: October 1
- Location: Cheek Field
  Danville, KY
- Game attendance: 3,000
- Referee: Lambert (Ohio State)

Centre opened the season with a 14–0 victory over the Clemson Tigers. A 7-yard run behind left tackle from Tom Bartlett got the first touchdown. McMillin skirted right end for the game's other score.

The starting lineup was: Bradley (left end), Roberts (left tackle), Jones (left guard), Kubale (center), Cregor (right guard), James (right tackle), Gordy (right end), McMillin (quarterback), Bartlett (left halfback), Armstrong (right halfback), and Tanner (fullback).

=== Week 2: VPI ===
Week 2: VPI at Centre

Team	1	2	3	4	Total
VPI	0	0	0	0	0
• Centre	0	0	0	14	14

- Date: October 8
- Location: Cheek Field
  Danville, KY
- Referee: Marty (Kenyon)

The next week was a 14–0 victory over VPI. Centre scored both touchdowns in the final quarter. They were scored in rapid succession by Tanner and Armstrong.

The starting lineup was: Bradley (left end), Roberts (left tackle), Jones (left guard), Kubale (center), Cregor (right guard), James (right tackle), Gordy (right end), McMillin (quarterback), Bartlett (left halfback), Armstrong (right halfback), and Tanner (fullback).

=== Week 3: at St. Xavier ===
Week 3: Centre at St. Xavier

Team	1	2	3	4	Total
• Centre	7	0	7	14	28
St. Xavier	6	0	0	0	6

- Date: October 15
- Location: Cincinnati, OH
- Referee: Roger Johnsan

Next was a 28–6 victory over St. Xavier of Cincinnati. This game marked the only time during the regular season that Centre gave up any points to an opponent.

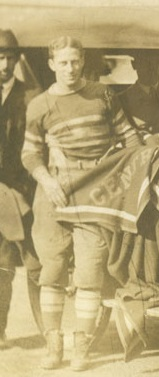
Snoddy, holding a Centre blanket the day before beating Harvard

The Saints outplayed the Colonels in the first half. Herb Davis recovered a fumble for a touchdown. "Trembling from excitement, Noppenerger missed the goal."

"McMillin, Covington and Armstrong carried the ball 46 yards to the one-foot line on three plays" before Tanner went over and kicked goal for the lead. In the third quarter, Thomasson bucked it over on runs of 9 and 1 yard. Davis once broke free, and with only Tanner to pass, had Tanner knife through three blockers to push him out of bounds. "The Colonels then showed their greatest offense when in five plays they took the ball 72 yards for a touchdown." Later, McMillin got the last touchdown.

The starting lineup was: Gordy (left end), Roberts (left tackle), Gibson (left guard), Kubale (center), Cregor (right guard), James (right tackle), Snoddy (right end), McMillin (quarterback), Bartlett (left halfback), Armstrong (right halfback), and Tanner (fullback).

=== Week 4: at Transylvania ===
Week 4: Centre at Transylvania

Team	1	2	3	4	Total
• Centre	26	34	28	10	98
Transylvania	0	0	0	0	0

- Date: October 22
- Location: Thomas Field
  Lexington, KY

In the fourth week of play, Centre easily defeated Transylvania by the score of 98–0. According to Spalding's Football Guide, McMillin ran back a kickoff 95 yards for a touchdown.

The starting lineup was: Roberts (left end), Gordy (left tackle), Jones (left guard), Kubale (center), Shedoan (right guard), Cregor (right tackle), James (right end), McMillin (quarterback), Snoddy (left halfback), Armstrong (right halfback), and Thomasson (fullback).

=== Week 5: at Harvard ===
Week 5: Centre at Harvard

Team	1	2	3	4	Total
• Centre	0	0	6	0	6
Harvard	0	0	0	0	0

- Date: October 29
- Location: Harvard Stadium
  Boston, MA
- Game attendance: 43,000
- Referee: R. W. Maxwell (Swarthmore)

On October 29, 1921, Centre met Harvard University, a team that had never lost to a team outside the East, and had not lost a game since 1918. It was coming off a victory in the 1920 Rose Bowl after an undefeated national championship season in 1919 - the school's fourth national championship in the prior ten years.

Coming into the Centre game, Harvard was also undefeated and unscored upon in the 1920 season. Some reports recall the players wearing work clothes to cultivate the image of the underdog. Coach Moran had Happy Chandler, who was at Harvard Law School, scout the Harvard team and take copious notes.

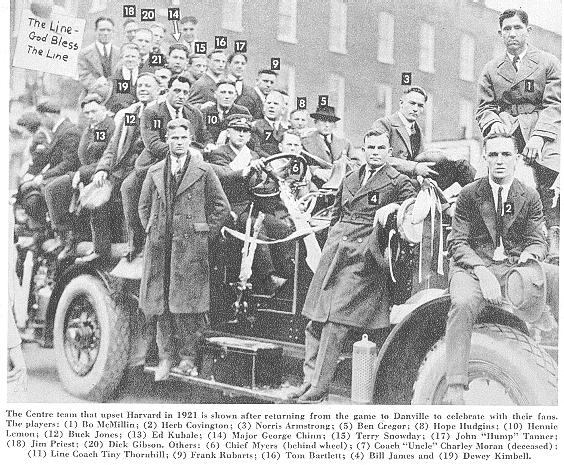
The Colonels in Danville, fresh off the defeat of Harvard

After a scoreless half, early in the third quarter Red Roberts told Bo McMillin "it's time to score, ride my hump" and McMillin ran for a 32-yard touchdown. He dodged three of Harvard's secondary. Harvard coach Bob Fisher said after the game: "In Bo McMillin Centre has a man who is probably the hardest in the country to stop."

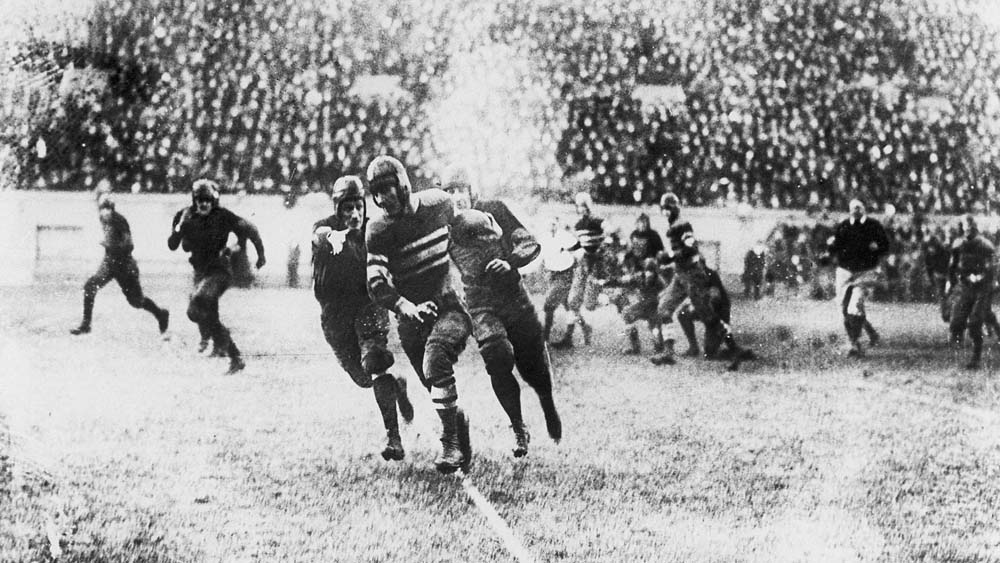
McMillin about to score

All around Danville students painted the "impossible formula" of C6H0. The campus post office has the last vestige of this on a side wall. Tulane coach Clark Shaughnessy later wrote the win "first awoke the nation to the possibilities of Southern football." In 1950, the Associated Press named C6H0 the greatest sports upset of the first half of the 20th century. In 2005, The New York Times called it "arguably the upset of the century in college football." In 2006, ESPN named it the third-biggest upset in the 138-year history of college football. On the return celebration in Danville on Monday, Governor Edwin P. Morrow remarked "I'd rather be Bo McMillin this moment than the Governor of Kentucky."

The starting lineup against Harvard was: James (left end), Moody (left tackle), Shadown (left guard), Kubale (center), Jones (right guard), Cregor (right tackle), Roberts (right end), McMillin (quarterback), Armstrong (left halfback), Snoddy (right halfback), and Bartlett (fullback)

=== Week 6: Kentucky ===
Week 6: Kentucky at Centre

Team	1	2	3	4	Total
Kentucky	0	0	0	0	0
• Centre	7	13	21	14	55

- Date: November 4
- Location: Cheek Field
  Danville, KY
- Referee: Henry (Kenyon)

Centre then defeated Kentucky 55–0. McMillin had three touchdowns. In the middle of the second quarter, up 7–0, McMillin skirted left end and cut back across the field for a 49-yard touchdown. Herb Covington next had a 39-yard touchdown. In the fourth, a 30-yard pass to Roberts was followed shortly by a 35-yard pass to Hennie Lemon for the touchdown. Bobby Lavin starred for the Wildcats.

The starting lineup was: Roberts (left end), Gordy (left tackle), Jones (left guard), Kubale (center), Shadoan (right guard), Cregor (right tackle), James (right end), McMillin (quarterback), Snoddy (left halfback), Armstrong (right halfback), and Bartlett (fullback).

=== Week 7: at Auburn ===
Week 7: Centre at Auburn

Team	1	2	3	4	Total
• Centre	7	7	0	7	21
Auburn	0	0	0	0	0

- Date: November 12
- Location: Rickwood Field
  Birmingham, AL
- Referee: Bradley Walker

In the seventh week of play Centre defeated Auburn 21–0. Roberts scored the first two touchdowns. Ed Sherling had Auburn's best run of the day around left tackle for 15 yards, but McMillin tackled him and forced a fumble, recovered by Armstrong putting Centre in striking distance for the second touchdown. McMillin scored the third touchdown in the fourth quarter. "There is no doubt that we were outclassed" said Auburn coach Mike Donahue.

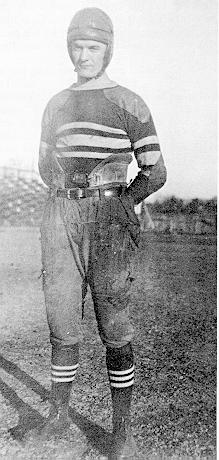
Norris "Army" Armstrong

The starting lineup was: Roberts (left end), Gordy (left tackle), Jones (left guard), Kubale (Center), Shadoan (right guard), Cregor (right tackle), James (right end), McMillin (quarterback), Snoddy (left halfback), Armstrong (right halfback), and Tanner (fullback).

=== Week 8: vs. Washington & Lee ===
Week 8: Washington & Lee vs. Centre

Team	1	2	3	4	Total
W&L	0	0	0	0	0
• Centre	0	13	6	6	25

- Date: November 19
- Location: Eclipse Park
  Louisville, KY
- Referee: Knight (Dartmouth)

Washington & Lee was then defeated 25–0 in the mud in Louisville. McMillin threw a 25-yard pass to Armstrong for the last touchdown. Judge Robert Worth Bingham hosted a dinner dance in honor of the two football teams.

The starting lineup was: Roberts (left end), Gordy (left tackle), Jones (left guard), Kubale (Center), Shadoan (right guard), Cregor (right tackle), James (right end), McMillin (quarterback), Snoddy (left halfback), Armstrong (right halfback), and Bartlett (fullback).

=== Week 9: at Tulane ===
Week 9: Centre at Tulane

Team	1	2	3	4	Total
• Centre	7	7	0	7	21
Tulane	0	0	0	0	0

- Date: November 24
- Location: Tulane Stadium
  New Orleans, LA
- Game attendance: 8,000
- Referee: Bradley Walker

The season closed with the defeat of Tulane by a score of 21–0. The Colonels were favored, and McMillin played a part in all of the scoring plays. He threw touchdown passes to Bartlett and to Snoddy, and ran one score in himself. He also kicked all the extra points.

Centre finished the regular season undefeated at 9–0 having given up only 6 points all season.

The starting lineup was: Roberts (left end), Gordy (left tackle), Jones (left guard), Kubale (Center), Shadoan (right guard), Cregor (right tackle), James (right end), McMillin (quarterback), Snoddy (left halfback), Armstrong (right halfback), and Tanner (fullback).

=== Arizona—San Diego East-West Christmas Classic ===
Centre vs. Arizona

Team	1	2	3	4	Total
• Centre	12	6	7	13	38
Arizona	0	0	0	0	0

- Date: December 26
- Location: Balboa Stadium
  San Diego, CA
- Game weather: Rain
- Referee: Evans

In the San Diego East-West Christmas Classic, Centre defeated Arizona 38–0 as rain fell throughout the game. Red Roberts scored the first touchdown five minutes into the match. Bo McMillin went over the right tackle for another score. Centre led 18–0 at the half as Arizona was held to no first downs in two quarters of play.

Arizona later made an attempt to drive towards a score, but Centre intercepted an Arizona pass to keep the game scoreless. Herb Covington scored on a punt return and a sweep to seal the victory.

The starting lineup was: Roberts (left end), Gordy (left tackle), Jones (left guard), Kubale (center), Shadoan (right guard), Cregor (right tackle), James (right end), McMillin (quarterback), Snoddy (left halfback), Armstrong (right halfback), and Tanner (fullback).

=== Texas A&M—Dixie Classic ===
Centre vs. Texas A&M

Team	1	2	3	4	Total
Centre	0	0	7	7	14
• Texas A&M	2	0	14	6	22

- Date: January 2, 1922
- Location: Fair Park Stadium
  Dallas, TX
- Game attendance: 20,000
- Referee: Ernest C. Quigley

After a long trip back, the Colonels played in the Dixie Classic in Dallas, a precursor to the modern Cotton Bowl Classic. The day before the game, McMillin was married. Centre was upset by coach Dana X. Bible's Texas A&M 14–22. It is the game in which Texas A&M's 12th man tradition originated.

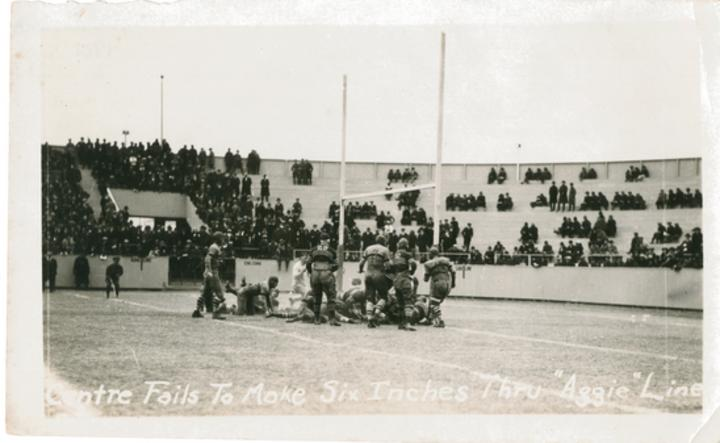
Centre held at the goal line by Texas A&M

The Aggies scored first and early by catching Tom Bartlett behind his goal for a safety. Centre went up 7–2 in the third quarter, Terry Snoddy running in the score after an A&M fumble. The Colonels fumbled the ensuing kickoff. The Aggies got the ball and a pass from Puny Wilson to Jack Evans got the touchdown. Centre fumbled again on the next possession. Wilson scored this time. Centre got the ball back, but Ted Winn intercepted the ball and ran 45 yards for the A&M touchdown. Centre's Snoddy scored again later, but the game ended soon afterwards, 22–14.

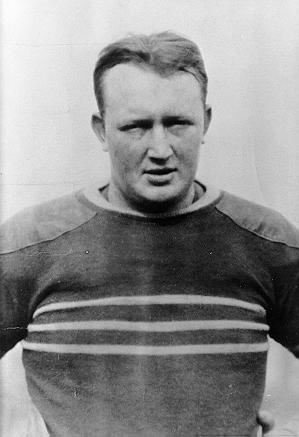
Red Roberts made Walter Camp's first-team All-America.

The starting lineup was: Roberts (left end), Gordy (left tackle), Jones (left guard), Kubale (Center), Shadoan (right guard), Cregor (right tackle), James (right end), McMillin (quarterback), Snoddy (left halfback), Armstrong (right halfback), and Bartlett (fullback).

== Awards and honors ==
The 1921 team produced the most stars for Centre's all-time team. Red Roberts was a first-team Walter Camp All-America selection, just the fourth in Southern history. Bo McMillin made Camp's second team and is recognized as a consensus All-American. McMillin was a unanimous All-Southern selection. Red Roberts made composite All-Southern, and Kubale and Snoddy made some selections.

== Championships ==
The Colonels were recognized by writers generally as champions of the South. Georgia Tech, Georgia, and Vanderbilt split the SIAA championship. Centre was arguably the strongest of the four, for as one publication reads: "Out of eleven games against eastern teams, Centre and Georgia Tech furnished the only two victories and Tech was later trounced by Penn State." For Georgia coach Herman Stegeman, the contest for the theoretical title of greatest Southern team was between Centre, Georgia Tech, and Georgia. Fuzzy Woodruff explains that Centre "belonged to no governing association" with several players thereby accused of professionalism, and Tech was picked as champion "through force of habit".

== Personnel ==
=== Coaching staff ===
- Charley Moran, head coach
- Chief Myers, assistant coach
- Tiny Thornhill, line coach
- John B. McGee, manager

=== Starters ===
==== Line ====
Number	Player	Position	Games started	Hometown	Prep school	Height	Weight	Age
28	Ben Cregor	Guard	11	Springfield, KY	Springfield H. S.	5'10"	178	22
26	Dick Gibson	Guard	1	Louisville, KY	Louisville H. S.	6'0"	180	20
22	Minos Gordy	Tackle	11	Abbeville, LA	Peoples Tuckers Academy	5'10"	176	20
10	Bill James	Tackle	11	Fort Worth, TX	North Side H. S.	5'11"	169	22
23	George "Buck" Jones	Guard	10	Dallas, TX	Dallas H. S.	5'11"	207	19
19	Ed Kubale	Center	11	Fort Smith, AR	Fort Smith H. S.	6'2"	176	21
29	Red Roberts	End	11	Somerset, KY	Somerset H. S.	6'2"	235	21
21	William Shadoan	Guard	8	Somerset, KY	Somerset H. S.	6'1"	174	23

==== Backfield ====
Number	Player	Position	Games started	Hometown	Prep school	Height	Weight	Age
7	Norris Armstrong	Halfback	11	Fort Smith, AR	Fort Smith H. S.	5'10"	154	21
3	Tom Bartlett	Fullback	7	Owensboro, KY	Owensboro H. S.	5'10"	160	21
11	Bo McMillin	Quarterback	11	Fort Worth, TX	North Side H. S.	5'9"	175	23
12	Terry Snoddy	Halfback	9	Owensboro, KY	Owensboro H. S.	5'10"	173	21
5	Hump Tanner	Fullback	6	Owensboro, KY	Owensboro H. S.	5'5"	165	21
16	Robert "Case" Thomasson	Fullback	1	Newport, KY	Newport H. S.	6'0"	170	18

=== Subs ===
==== Line ====
Number	Player	Position	Hometown	Prep school	Height	Weight	Age
	Don Beane	Guard	Pittsburgh, PA	Staunton Military Academy	5'7"	175	19
	Weldon Bradley	End	Fort Worth, TX	Fort Worth Central H. S.	5'10"	165	21
	Fred Caudill	Tackle	Blackey, KY		6'0"	175	21
20	George M. Chinn	Guard	Harrodsburg, KY	Millersburg Military Academy	5'10"	180	20
	Leslie Combs	End	Lexington, KY				
25	Royce Flippin	Center	Somerset, KY	Somerset H. S.	6'0"	180	190
	Sheridan Rhodes Ingerton	End	Amarillo, TX				
2	Hennie Lemon	End	Mayfield, KY	Mayfield H. S.	5'10"	165	20
	Robert Newell	Tackle	Dallas, TX	Dallas H. S.	6'4"	205	20
	Jim Priest	End	Henderson, KY				
9	Frank Rubarth	Guard	Gatesville, TX	Gatesville H. S.	5'11"	170	22

==== Backfield ====
Number	Player	Position	Hometown	Prep school	Height	Weight	Age
	Swede Anderson	Halfback	Fort Worth, TX				22
	Ray Class	Halfback	Middletown, OH		5'10"	169	19
14	Herb Covington	Halfback, quarterback	Mayfield, KY	Mayfield H. S.	5'5"	158	19
	Jim Green	Halfback	Louisville, KY	Louisville H. S.	5'7"	142	20
	Hope Hudgins	Halfback	Amarillo, TX	Columbia Military Academy	5'8"	152	20
	Dewey Kimbel	Halfback	Louisville, KY		5'6"	136	22
	Tom Moran	Fullback	Horse Cave, KY	Horse Cave H. S.	5'8"	175	22
1	Joe Murphy	Halfback, quarterback	Columbus, OH	East H. S.	5'4"	130	22

==== Unlisted ====
Player	Hometown	Prep school	Height	Weight	Age
Edgar C. Newlin	Newport, KY				

=== Scoring leaders ===
The following is an incomplete list of statistics and scores, largely dependent on newspaper summaries.

Player	Touchdowns	Extra points	Field goals	Points
Bo McMillin	12	19	0	91
Terry Snoddy	8	0	0	48
Red Roberts	6	5	0	41
Hump Tanner	4	5	1	32
Herb Covington	5	1	0	31
Norris Armstrong	4	0	0	24
Tom Bartlett	3	2	0	20
Hennie Lemon	2	1	0	13
Case Thomasson	2	0	0	12
Jim Green	1	0	0	6
Hope Hudgins	1	0	0	6
Joe Murphy	1	0	0	6
Ray Class	0	1	1	4
Total	49	34	2	334

=== Depth chart ===
The following chart provides a visual depiction of Centre's lineup during the 1921 season with games started at the position reflected in parentheses. The chart mimics a single wing on offense.

LE Red Roberts (7) W. Bradley (2) Minos Gordy (1) Bill James (1) Leslie Combs (0) R. Ingerton (0)	LG Buck Jones (9) Dick Gibson (1) W. Shadoan (1) Don Beane (0) G. Chinn (0)	C Ed Kubale (11) Royce Flippin (0)	RG W. Shadoan (7) Ben Cregor (3) Buck Jones (1) Frank Rubarth (0)	LT Minos Gordy (8) Red Roberts (3) Fred Caudill (0)	RT Ben Cregor (8) Bill James (3) Robert Newell (0)	RE Bill James (7) Minos Gordy (2) Red Roberts (1) Terry Snoddy (1) Hennie Lemon (0) Jim Priest (0)
				QB Bo McMillin (11) H. Covington (0) Joe Murphy (0)			RHB N. Armstrong (10) Terry Snoddy (1) S. Anderson (0) H. Covington (0) Jim Green (0) Joe Murphy (0)
			FB Hump Tanner (6) Tom Bartlett (4) C. Thomasson (1) Tom Moran (0)
	LHB Terry Snoddy (7) Tom Bartlett (3) N. Armstrong (1) Hope Hudgins (0) Dewey Kimbel (0) Ray Class (0)

== Bibliography ==
- Camp, Walter (1922). National Collegiate Athletic Association Football Rules: Official Intercollegiate Football Guide. New York: American Sports: Spalding's Athletic Library.
- Flaherty, Vincent X. (1946). J. G. Taylor Spink (ed.). "The Life Story of Albert B. "Happy" Chandler". Baseball Guide and Record Book. St. Louis, Missouri: Charles C. Spink and Son.
- Kaplan, Inc. (June 22, 2004). The Unofficial, Unbiased Guide to the 331 Most Interesting Colleges 2005. Simon and Schuster. ISBN 9780743251990.
- Woodruff, Fuzzy (1928). A History of Southern Football 1890–1928. Vol. 2.
