= 1921 Centre vs. Harvard football game =

American college football game

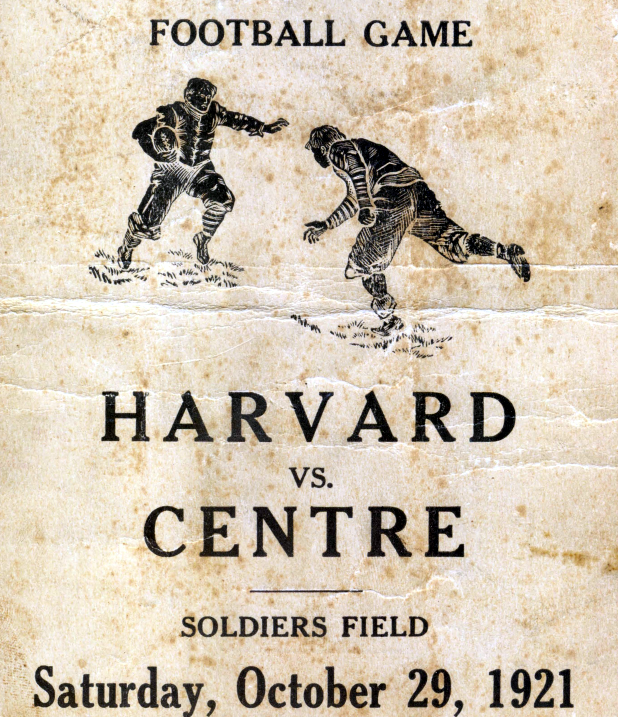
- Cover of the official game program
Centre Praying Colonels	Harvard Crimson
(4–0)	(5–0–1)
6	0
Head coach: Charley Moran	Head coach: Bob Fisher
	1	2	3	4	Total
Centre	0	0	6	0	6
Harvard	0	0	0	0	0
- Date: October 29, 1921
- Season: 1921
- Stadium: Harvard Stadium
- Location: Boston, Massachusetts, U.S.
- Referee: R. W. Maxwell

The 1921 Centre vs. Harvard football game was a regular-season collegiate American football game played on October 29, 1921, at Harvard Stadium in Boston, Massachusetts. The contest featured the undefeated Centre Praying Colonels, representing Centre College, and the undefeated Harvard Crimson, representing Harvard University. Centre won the game 6–0, despite entering as heavy underdogs, and the game is widely viewed as one of the largest upsets in college football history. The game is often referred to by the shorthand C6H0, after a Centre professor's remark that Harvard had been poisoned by this "impossible" chemical formula.

The teams had met for the first time in the previous year. Centre, led by Charley Moran, shocked many by taking a tie into halftime but ultimately Bob Fisher's Harvard squad took control in the second half and won the game. Centre played well enough to warrant a rematch the following year, and the Colonels, led by quarterback Bo McMillin and halfback Norris Armstrong, again found themselves tied with the Crimson at halftime. Less than two minutes into the game's third quarter, McMillin rushed for a touchdown, the only score of the game, giving the visitors a 6–0 lead. The conversion failed but the Centre defense held for the remainder of the game. Harvard threatened and even reached the Centre 3-yard line at one point but were unable to score. Regaining possession with several minutes remaining in the game, the Praying Colonels ran out the clock to secure a six-point victory and maintain their perfect record.

Once word of the victory arrived in Danville, Kentucky, Centre students began writing the "impossible formula" around campus. When team members returned two days after the game, they were received as heroes and were paraded down Main Street by a party that included Governor Edwin P. Morrow. Harvard lost its game with Princeton the following week and finished the season with a 7–2–1 record, while Centre finished the regular season with four more wins before defeating Arizona in the 1921 San Diego East-West Christmas Classic. Centre's lone defeat came to Texas A&M in the 1922 Dixie Classic on January 2, leaving them with a 10–1 record.

== Background ==
=== Recent years ===
Football was played only informally at Harvard in 1917 and 1918 because of World War I. The team returned in 1919 under the leadership of new head coach Bob Fisher. Harvard finished their 1919 season with an undefeated record; they did not allow a point to be scored against them for the first six games of the season, until a 10–10 tie with Princeton. They went on to win the Tournament East-West Football Game against Oregon, 7–6, and were retroactively named outright national champions by two selectors, the Helms Athletic Foundation and the Houlgate System. The team continued its success in 1920, finishing the season with another undefeated record which was similarly blemished only by a tie with Princeton. The Crimson were again retroactively selected to a share of the national championship, though this time only by one selector, the Boand System, as the majority chose undefeated and untied California instead.

After an undefeated start to the decade in 1910, the Centre College football team fell on hard times and went through a stretch of four years with a losing record from 1912 to 1915.

The team rebounded with a 7–1 campaign in 1917, earning shutouts in every win, in coach Charley Moran's first season. Moran had been recruited to the college by Robert L. Myers at the request of Centre president William Arthur Ganfield and brought with him several players who went on to be very impactful for Centre, including Bo McMillin, Red Weaver, and Red Roberts. All three players were named All-Americans by Walter Camp, a sportswriter of the time (and former coach) who introduced the concept of the All-America team and has since been referred to as the "father of American football". Centre finished the 1919 season undefeated and untied and were retroactively recognized by one selector, Jeff Sagarin, as the season's national champions.

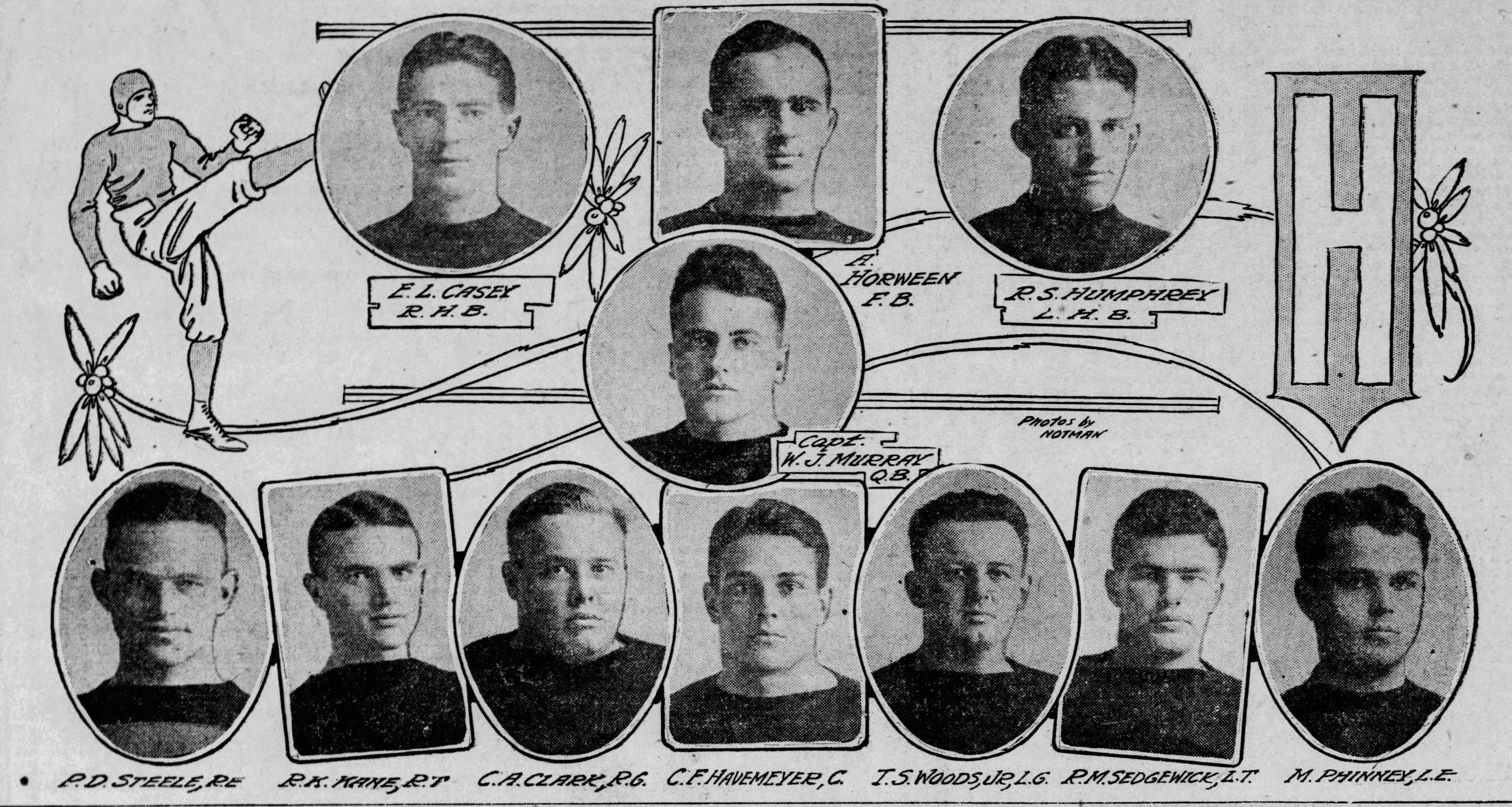
Harvard's 1919 football starters; Arnold Horween, captain in 1920, is shown top center

They attracted attention with their win over West Virginia in November 1919; the Mountaineers had defeated Princeton, one of the Big Three and among the best teams of the time, in a shutout the week before and went on to finish the season 8–2. Centre won a further eight games in 1920 and ended the season with a 56-point win over TCU in the Fort Worth Classic.

Howard Reynolds, the sports editor at The Boston Post, was the first to come up with the idea that Harvard's football team should add Centre College to its schedule; after hearing about their 1919 win against West Virginia, he went with former Harvard halfback Eddie Mahan to scout the Colonels. After watching them defeat Georgetown College by a seventy-point margin, both men were sufficiently impressed and Centre was added to the 1920 schedule.

=== 1920 meeting ===
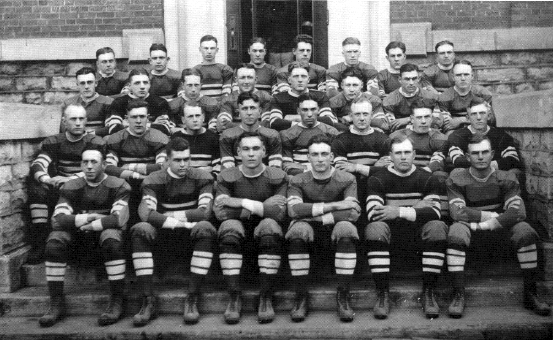
1920 Centre team photograph

The teams first met on October 23, 1920, at Harvard Stadium in the Boston neighborhood of Allston. Entering the game, both teams were undefeated and untied and neither Centre, in three games, nor Harvard, in four, had been scored on. Centre's team was called "the scoring machine of the football universe" by The Dayton Herald after totaling 241 points in their first three games combined. Attendance was estimated by The Dayton Herald to be at least 37,000 people (and was reported to have been as high as 45,000). Ticket sales were stopped the night before when the contest sold out and as many as 10,000 potential attendees were turned away at the gates as a result. In contrast, Centre had never played before a crowd exceeding 8,000 fans. Harvard was favored to win the game with 8-to-5 odds and had, on average, a 22-pound weight advantage over Centre's squad. Centre president William Arthur Ganfield traveled to attend the game and led the team in prayer before they took the field.

The Praying Colonels surprised many by taking a 14–14 tie into halftime. Harvard scored one touchdown in each quarter, adding a field goal in the third quarter, and held Centre scoreless in the second half to win 31–14. McMillin, Centre's quarterback, finished the game having tallied 151 rushing yards and 131 passing yards. During the game, Harvard used nine of its substitutes while Centre used three. Following the game, Harvard captain Arnold Horween offered the game ball to McMillin, who declined the ball and promised "We'll be back next year to take it home with us." The Boston Globe described the game as the most interesting to watch in Harvard Stadium's history. Centre was praised by The Boston Globe for its resiliency and unwillingness to give up. After the game, the Harvard team hosted Centre's team, coaches, and president for dinner. The visitors earned $6,000 (equivalent to $96,000 in 2025) from the game. Despite this loss, Centre was still seen as a strong team by the sportswriter Fuzzy Woodruff, who said that they entered their next game against Georgia Tech as an "unbeatable team". Despite this, Centre ultimately lost that game 24–0.

McMillin and captain Norris Armstrong played basketball for Centre in the offseason, during which the Colonels defeated Harvard by five points. McMillin was made a Kentucky Colonel by governor Edwin P. Morrow around the same time.

=== Starting the 1921 season ===
Both Centre and Harvard entered their 1921 meeting undefeated. The Colonels began their season with an October 1 home contest against Clemson, which they won 14–0; it was initially uncertain as to whether Moran, also an umpire for baseball's National League, would make it to Danville in time for the start of his season, though he arrived several days prior on September 28. Centre defeated VPI at home by the same score the following week before traveling to Cincinnati to take on St. Xavier College, a 28–6 Centre win. Centre's final game before the Harvard contest was in Lexington against the Transylvania Crimsons; the visitors led 60–0 at halftime and ultimately won by a 98–0 score. The Harvard game was Centre's third consecutive road game and the team entered with a 4–0 record.

Harvard began their season with shutout defeats of Boston University and Middlebury College as part of a doubleheader on September 24. Their next game was a 3–0 defeat of Holy Cross which saw Charles Buell score the lone points of the game on a drop kick field goal in the third quarter. The last of Harvard's four consecutive shutout victories came against Indiana by a nineteen-point margin, and they continued their winning ways against Georgia the following week by a score of 10–7. Their final game before hosting Centre was a matchup with Penn State, in which they played to a 21–21 tie.

The Centre–Harvard matchup captivated media attention in the weeks leading up to the game. On October 21, Boston Post reporter Howard Reynolds arrived in Danville. He sent reports back to Boston by telegram regularly detailing Centre's preparation and rode with the team from Danville to Boston. During the buildup, numerous publications assigned reporters to Boston, including the Louisville Herald, Louisville Evening Post, Courier Journal, Louisville Times, Kentucky Advocate, Daily Messenger, Lexington Herald, and Lexington Leader.

== Players and personnel ==
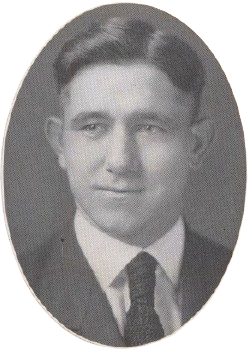
Bo McMillin, c. 1921

Harvard, in the third season of Bob Fisher's tenure as head coach, was captained by R. Keith Kane. The starting offensive line for the contest with Centre consisted of left tackle Alexander Ladd, left guard Charles Hubbard, center Francis Kernan, right guard Fiske Brown, and right tackle Philip Kunhardt. Henry Janin started for the Crimson at left end and Charles Macomber started at right end. Harvard started two halfbacks: Francis Rouillard on the left and Vinton Chapin on the right. Erwin Gehrke was the starting fullback and the team's starting quarterback was Frank Johnson. Kernan, Kunhardt, Rouillard, and Gehrke were the four changes to Harvard's lineup against Penn State the previous week; they took the field against Centre in the place of Henry Clark, Alexander Ladd, George Owen, and Winthrop Churchill, respectively.

Fisher's varsity coaching staff included only former Harvard players, a practice he had implemented from the time he took the head coaching position. In total, the team had 17 coaches, including 11 assistants for the varsity squad and five coaches assigned to the freshman team. Tommy Campbell, the former North Carolina head coach and a Harvard alumnus, was the new freshman team head coach for the 1921 season. These numbers were in contrast to Centre's coaching staff, which totaled two (or three, including director of athletics Robert Myers).

Centre was led by fifth-year head coach Charley Moran; the team captain was starting right halfback Norris Armstrong. Centre's offensive line was anchored by Ed Kubale at center, with Ben Cregor and Buck Jones at tackle and guard to his left, and Minos Gordy alongside William Shadoan filling the same positions to his right. Red Roberts started at left end and Bill James was the right end. Terry Snoddy was the left halfback, alongside Armstrong at right halfback, and Hump Tanner was the fullback. The Praying Colonels offense was led by quarterback Bo McMillin. In all, 28 players made the trip and suited up for Centre. The train carrying the Centre team left Danville early on the morning of Wednesday, October 26, and saw crowds at their stops in Lexington, Cincinnati, and Columbus. They arrived in Boston on Thursday afternoon.

The Colonels experienced some changes in their squad compared to the year prior, including the departure of center Red Weaver, a 1919 consensus All-American, for a coaching job at New River State College (now West Virginia Tech). Additionally, Centre was unable to field punter and end Ed "Lefty" Whitnell for the contest due to his poor grades; rather than travel with the team anyway, he stayed in Danville and announced game updates at a local theater as they were received from Boston. Several weeks before the game, Ganfield announced that he was resigning as president so that he could take the presidency of Carroll College. However, his Carroll contract stipulated that he would not leave Centre before the Harvard game and so his resignation took effect on December 1, 1921.

== Game summary ==
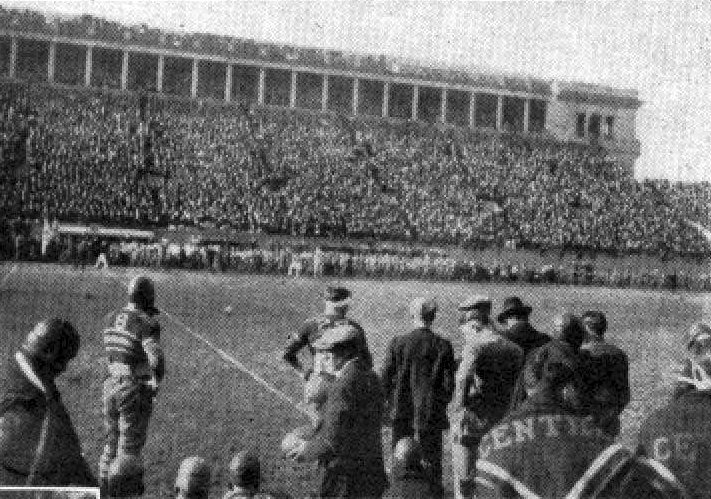
Centre players on the sideline

The contest was refereed by R. W. Maxwell. He was assisted by a crew of three other officials: umpire W. R. Crowley, linesman J. J. Tigert, and field judge W. G. Crowell. Maxwell and Crowell, both from Swarthmore College, had also been part of the officiating crew for the Centre–Harvard game the year prior. Entering the contest, sportswriters and pundits gave Harvard 3-to-1 odds to win, though some felt that Centre had a better chance to win than they had the year prior, especially given the improved play of their offensive line. The Crimson entered on a 25-game undefeated streak, having last lost a varsity-level non-informal game on November 25, 1916. (Note: Excludes losses by the "Harvard Informals" to the Newport Naval Reserves (November 17, 1917) and Brown (November 30, 1918).) Tickets sold for $2 apiece (equivalent to $36 in 2025). The stadium was sold out and attendance was expected to be around 45,000 people. The game began at 2:30 p.m. ET.

Centre won the ceremonial pre-game coin toss and chose to defend the north goal. As a result, Harvard received possession of the ball first. In the early stages of the game, neither team was able to sustain an offensive attack. Harvard's opening kickoff resulted in a touchback, giving Centre the ball for the first offensive series of the game at their own 20-yard line. The visitors punted but forced a fumble, recovered by Bill James, and regained possession quickly. From there, the teams traded punts and Centre failed on a field goal attempt of around 40 yards by Raymond Class, the only play of the game in which he participated. The first quarter ended scoreless with Harvard in possession around midfield. In the Crimson's first possession of the second quarter, they reached the Centre 11-yard line by way of a forward pass followed by a series of repeated dives. Unable to reach the end zone, they settled for a 22-yard field goal attempt from Charles Buell which was too low. Centre fumbled soon after but regained possession following another failed field goal attempt by Buell, this time from a distance of 37 yards. The Praying Colonels did not have sufficient time to complete an entire series before the end of the second quarter, and the halftime score was 0–0.

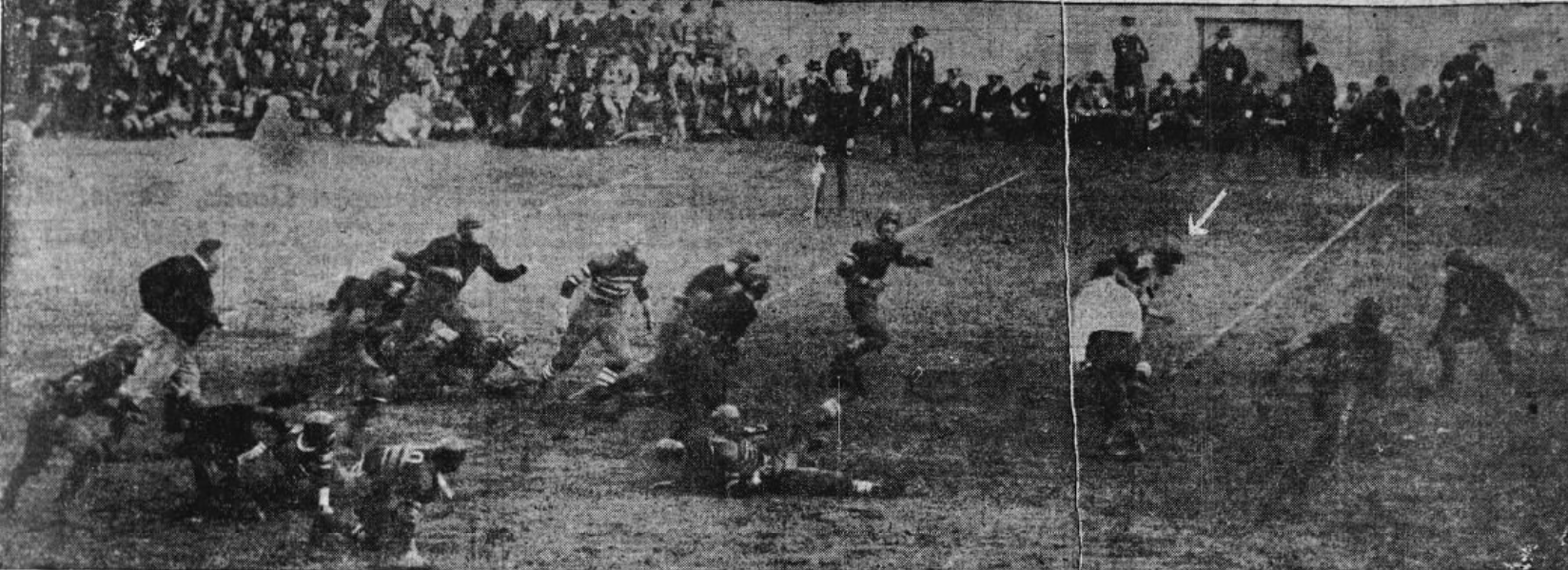
McMillin's third-quarter touchdown rush; he is shown on the right side of the picture with an arrow

Centre kicked off to begin the third quarter and Harvard returned the kick to their own 15-yard line; the Crimson punted shortly after. Centre's Tom Bartlett took the return to the Harvard 45-yard line, and the ball was further advanced down the field after the Crimson were penalized for tripping. On the next play from scrimmage, less than two minutes into the quarter, McMillin scored the game's first and only points on a rushing touchdown when he faked a pass, followed Roberts, who was blocking in front of him, and evaded several members of Harvard's secondary by cutting back just before he reached the goal line. (Note: Sources disagree as to the exact distance of McMillin's rushing touchdown; 30, 31, 32, 33, and 35-yard rushes are all listed by various sources, both contemporary and modern.) Bartlett attempted the extra point kick but failed, keeping the score 6–0. After the teams traded punts, Centre's Norris Armstrong intercepted a pass from Frank Johnson, giving the Colonels possession. Centre reached the Harvard 30-yard line after several plays but soon after threw an interception of their own. Harvard was unable to capitalize on the miscue and punted. Centre reached the Harvard 11-yard line by the end of the third quarter. Armstrong left the game due to an injury late in the third quarter, leaving McMillin as the team's captain; Herb Covington replaced him at left halfback. Centre's ensuing drive ended with a turnover after McMillin's pass fell incomplete in the end zone. Under the rules in place at the time, this resulted in a touchback, and Harvard took the ball on its own 20-yard line. After each team punted once, Harvard threatened to score, going so far as to reach Centre's 3-yard line, but failed to do so after lining up offside. Several plays later they were intercepted again, this time by Bartlett. That drive was Harvard's last on offense; rushes by McMillin, Covington, Terry Snoddy, and Red Roberts were sufficient to maintain Centre's drive and end the game with a 6–0 score in favor of the visitors.

Maxwell personally handed the game ball to McMillin upon the game's conclusion. It was then handed to future Kentucky governor Happy Chandler, a former Transylvania University football player attending the game while a student at Harvard Law School, who carried it safely away from the crowd. Around ten thousand fans descended from the stands and gathered on the field after the game. The goal posts were torn down in celebration by students from the Massachusetts Institute of Technology, who were in attendance to support Centre.

== Aftermath ==
=== Game analysis ===
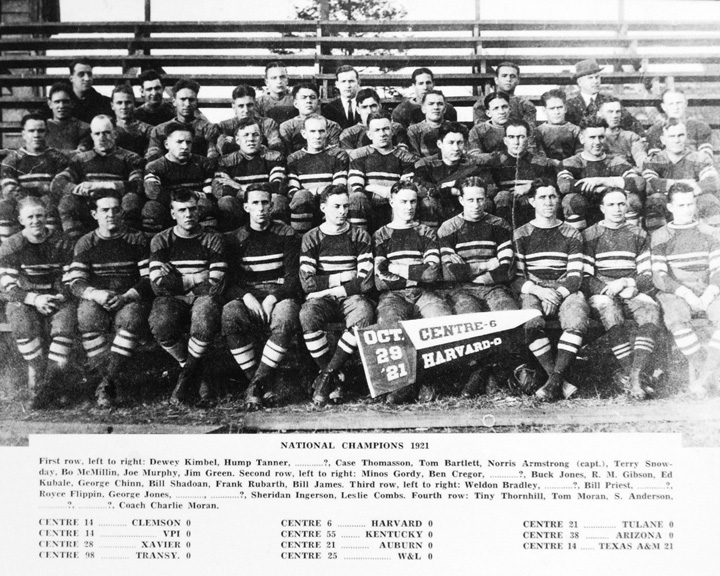
1921 Centre team with a pennant alluding the game

McMillin was praised by The Danville Daily Messenger in their recap of the game. Harvard ran only four different plays on offense, all described as having been "not at all intricate", and did not change their strategy even after falling behind. They started more of their bench players than usual, though all except three of their usual starters ended up recording game time; this was due to several injuries sustained by players during their game the week prior against Penn State, who were likely taking extra precaution to rest so that they would be ready to play against Princeton the following week. Centre surprised sportswriters with its own offensive plan, involving far more rushing and fewer passes than were expected in spite of their fewer numbers and smaller size. This was intentional, as Centre had intended to conceal some of the more elaborate parts of their gameplan until the second half so as to avoid giving Harvard the opportunity to make adjustments at halftime.

McMillin, in his own analysis of the game, complemented the performance of his offense. He praised the offensive linemen as "heroes" and said that "no better blockers ever played football".

=== Immediate impact and reactions ===
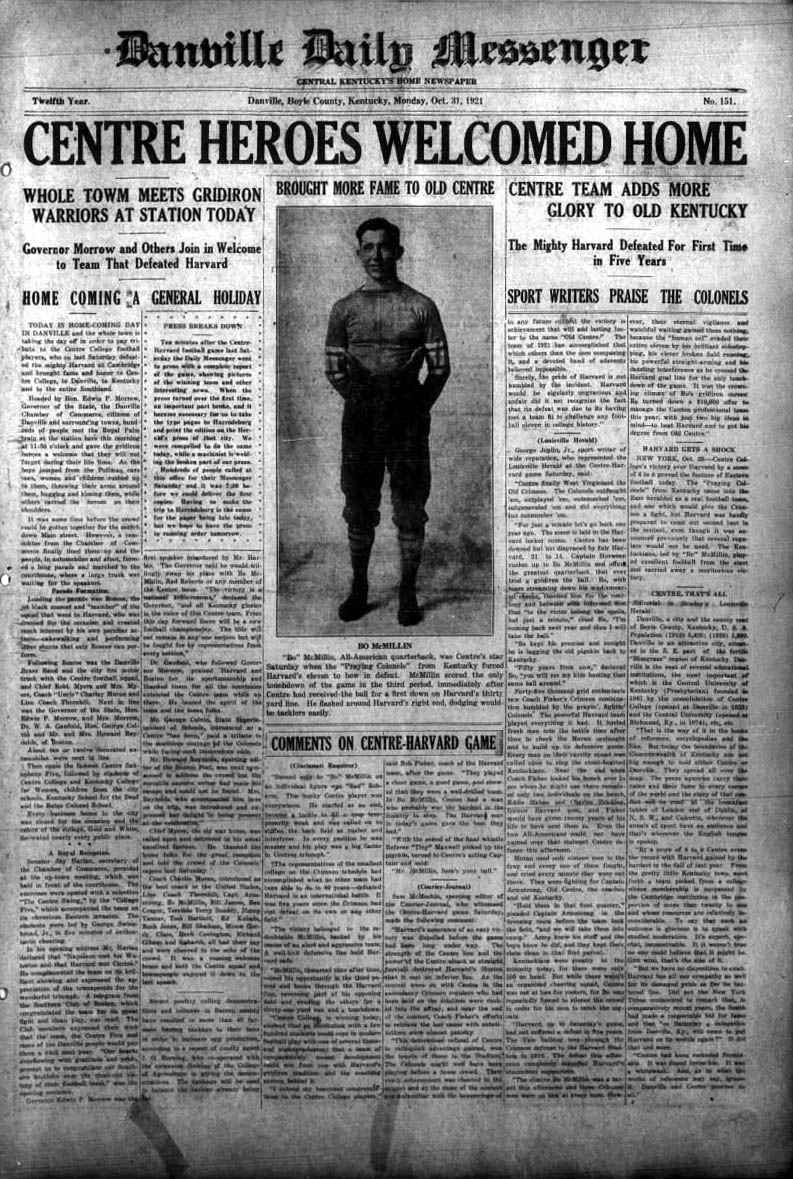
The front page of the Danville Daily Messenger on October 31, two days after the game

Once the game ended, McMillin was carried off of the field on the shoulders of fans in celebration. On their way back to their hotel, the Centre team was met by large crowds, as they had during their previous visit to Harvard. After the game, Harvard coach Bob Fisher said, "In Bo McMillin, Centre has a man who is probably the hardest in the country to stop." Centre's win brought profit to its team in addition to pride; McMillin and several other players had placed large bets on themselves in the days before the game and had sent another Centre student, Gus King, to Boston the week prior to do the same. A reporter with the Courier Journal said that McMillin had more money with him on the train home than would have been present in a small bank, and lineman George Chinn remarked that he had never seen so much money in one place.

The Centre team returned to Danville on October 31 and were greeted by a homecoming party which included Governor Morrow, the Danville Chamber of Commerce, the Superintendent of Education, and 10,000 local residents. Upon exiting their train, the team paraded down Main Street. Classes were cancelled at Centre and the local school district on the day of the team's return and "Victory Day" was observed in nearby Harrodsburg on November 6, where another parade was held for the team. Morrow later remarked that he would "rather be Bo McMillin at this moment than the governor of Kentucky" and The Advocate-Messenger declared McMillin the "hero of [the] football world" the following week.

The phrase by which the game is most commonly known, "C6H0", originated from a comment made by a Centre professor shortly following the game: that Harvard had been "poisoned" by the organic compound with that formula. It stuck, and students painted the so-called "impossible formula" all around Danville, including on various buildings around campus and on the flank of a cow.

=== Concluding the season and final meeting ===
The Centre victory was a shock, but perhaps not a fluke; the team finished the 1921 regular season 9–0, with shutout defeats of Kentucky, Auburn, Washington and Lee, and Tulane. This last game was scheduled as a replacement for their original opponent, Georgetown, who backed out before the season after determining they would be too outmatched. DePauw was Centre's first choice for a replacement, but they declined and Tulane offered to join the Colonels' schedule as a substitute. Before announcing Tulane as their opponent, the school had received a $7,500 offer (equivalent to $135,000 in 2025) from the University of Detroit team to travel to Michigan for a Thanksgiving Day game, but Centre declined. By the time Centre played Washington and Lee, the football team had earned a gross sum of $66,000 (equivalent to $1.19 million in 2025) for the school. The Praying Colonels were inundated with offers of postseason games and had to decline invitations from the Polo Grounds, Yale, Princeton, the Rose Bowl, and Notre Dame; the last of these invitations was delivered in person in Danville by Notre Dame head coach Knute Rockne. Ultimately, Centre opted to take part in two postseason contests. The first was played in San Diego as the San Diego East-West Christmas Classic and saw Centre defeat Arizona by a score of 38–0. Their second postseason contest was the Dixie Classic to be played against Texas A&M at Fair Park Stadium in Dallas. McMillin was married on the morning of that game; the wedding was attended by members of the Centre team who afterwards went to the stadium to play. A&M held a 2–0 lead through halftime and scored three touchdowns in the second half to secure a 22–14 victory which itself was called "one of the biggest upsets of the football season" by the New-York Tribune. This game is also remembered as the birth of Texas A&M's "12th man" tradition after a former member of the A&M football team who was in the press box was called down to suit up by head coach Dana X. Bible, though he ultimately did not play. Centre concluded their season with a 10–1 record and cumulatively outscored their opponents by a margin of 334 to 28.

Harvard's loss to Centre turned out to be the first of back-to-back defeats for the Crimson, as they fell by a seven-point margin to Princeton the following week in their first and only game of the season played away from Harvard Stadium. Their schedule concluded with wins over Brown, by two points, and Yale, by seven, leaving them with a record of 7–2–1. They finished having outscored their opponents 101 to 54.

In the locker room after the game, Harvard graduate manager Fred Moore offered Moran $10,000 (equivalent to $181,000 in 2025) to return to Boston in 1922 for a third game. Moran accepted, and Centre and Harvard met for a third and final time on October 21, 1922, again at Harvard Stadium. Harvard jumped out to an early advantage and had a 21–0 lead after the first quarter. Despite their offense finding little success after this, they held the lead after each team scored a field goal in the second quarter. Centre managed a fourth-quarter touchdown but could not score further, and the game concluded 24–10 in favor of Harvard.

== Legacy ==
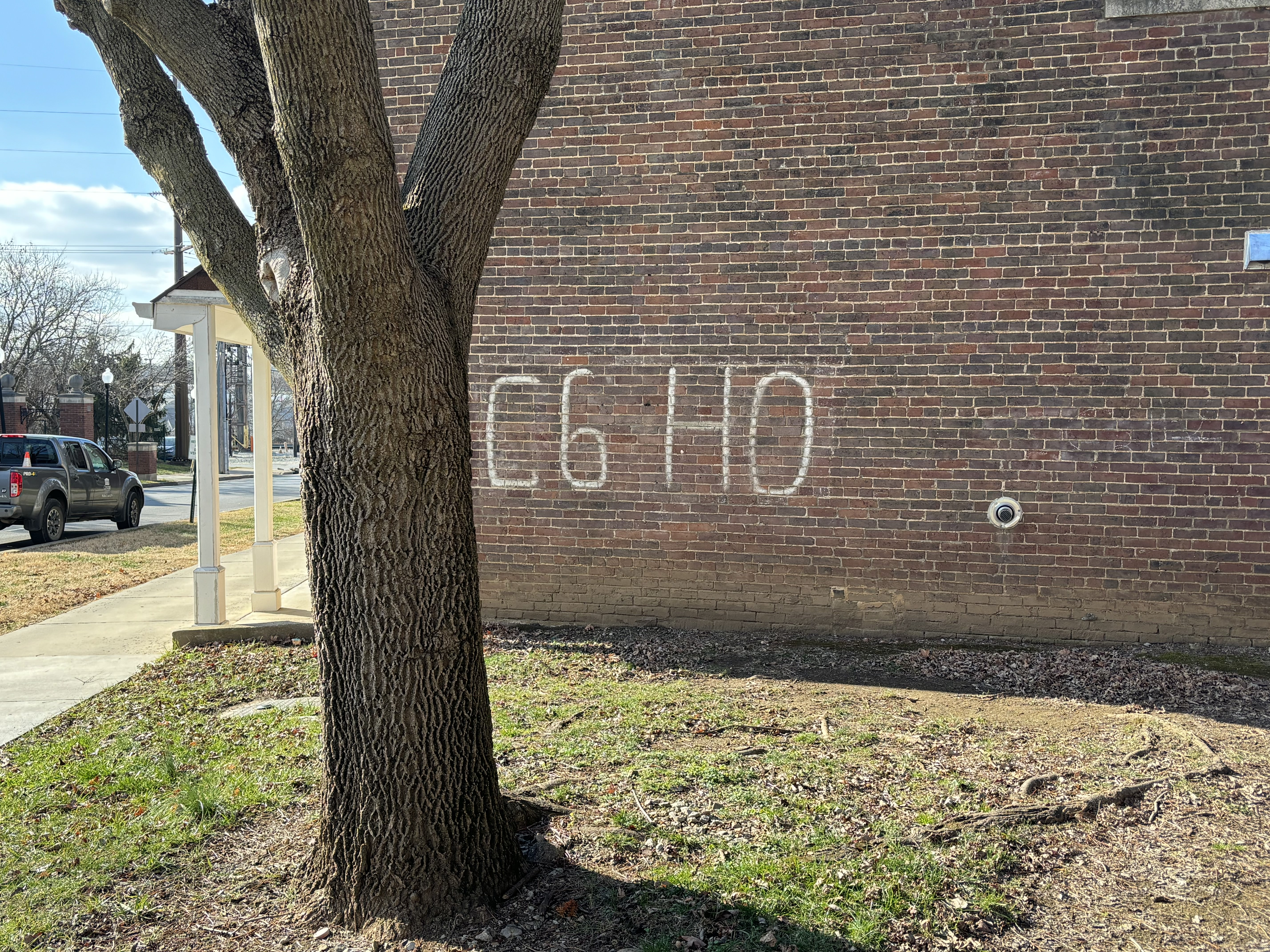
The "impossible formula" painted on the side of a building at Centre, pictured in 2024. In the days after the game, the formula was painted by students all around Danville.

The game is generally viewed as one of the largest upsets in the history of college football. In 1950, the Associated Press named it the greatest sports upset of the first half of the 20th century, and The New York Times proclaimed it the "upset of the century". ESPN named it the third-biggest upset in the history of college football in 2006, and the game was ranked fourth in a similar list published by Bleacher Report in 2011. The game also ranked No. 126 on an ESPN list of the 150 greatest college football games of all time, released in 2019. In recaps of the game from the early 21st century, Centre's win over Harvard has been compared to upsets of programs such as USC and Alabama. In a 2011 article, The Harvard Crimson compared it to Appalachian State's 2007 upset of Michigan.

McMillin was inducted into the College Football Hall of Fame in 1951. Centre coach Charley Moran was inducted into the Kentucky Athletic Hall of Fame in 1963, and McMillin received the same honor on November 12, 2015. On the latter occasion the Lexington Herald-Leader called McMillin "Kentucky's first college sports mega-star" and said his touchdown rush was "arguably the most significant [touchdown] ever registered by a Kentucky college football player". A Fort Worth native, he had previously been inducted into the Texas Sports Hall of Fame in 1983.

Centre has proposed a rematch on multiple occasions, including the 50th and 75th anniversaries of the 1921 contest, but such a game has never happened due to logistical issues and the difference in strength that has developed between Harvard, now a member of the NCAA Division I Football Championship Subdivision, and Centre, a member of NCAA Division III. When asked about the prospect of a rematch, Harvard head coach Tim Murphy did not show interest, saying that his team would have "nothing to gain and everything to lose".
