= William Arthur Ganfield =

American academic administrator (1873–1940)

The Reverend William Arthur Ganfield
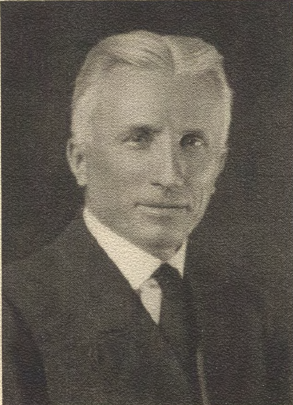
- Ganfield c. 1921

6th President of Carroll College
- In office December 1, 1921 – July 1, 1939
- Preceded by: Herbert Pierpont Houghton
- Succeeded by: Gerrit T. Vander Lugt

11th President of Centre College
- In office June 1, 1915 – December 1, 1921
- Preceded by: Frederick W. Hinitt
- Succeeded by: R. Ames Montgomery

Personal details
- Born: September 3, 1873 Cascade, Iowa, U.S.
- Died: October 18, 1940 (aged 67) Chicago, Illinois, U.S.
- Party: Republican
- Spouse: Clara Boardman (m. 1901)
- Children: 5
- Education: Cornell College; McCormick Theological Seminary; University of Chicago

William Arthur Ganfield (September 3, 1873 – October 18, 1940) was an American pastor, educator, and academic administrator who was president of Centre College in Danville, Kentucky, from 1915 to 1921, then of Carroll College (now Carroll University) in Waukesha, Wisconsin, until he retired in 1939.

A preacher in Green Bay, Wisconsin, Ganfield joined the history faculty at Carroll in 1904 and stayed until 1915, when he was elected president of what is now Centre College. He reversed decisions by his predecessor, Frederick W. Hinitt, to make the school nonsectarian; instead, he restored the school's close connection with the Presbyterian Church, leading to an increase in enrollment and a successful fundraising campaign. Centre saw athletic success during Ganfield's tenure, particularly in football: the 1919 team was retroactively recognized as national champions and the 1921 team defeated Harvard University in a noted upset. Ganfield, who had agreed to return to Carroll as its president, stipulated that he would not do so until after the Harvard game.

Ganfield took office at Carroll after the school's first lay president; he kept its ties to the church intact and maintained daily chapel attendance as a requirement for students. Enrollment and the endowment grew during his 19-year term, the latter to $800,000. Sports enjoyed increased attention and success; Norris Armstrong, a former member of Centre's football team, came to Carroll in 1923 to coach the football and basketball teams; both won league titles. Faculty pensions were introduced during the Great Depression, and fixed salaries were implemented as the faculty numbers grew. Ganfield retired in 1939 due to poor health and died the following year.

== Early life and education ==
William Arthur Ganfield was born on September 3, 1873, in Cascade, Iowa. He attended Cornell College in Mount Vernon, Iowa, where he earned a Bachelor of Arts in 1898 and a Master of Arts in 1901. Afterward, he attended McCormick Theological Seminary in Chicago and completed graduate work at the University of Chicago.

== Career ==
=== Green Bay and Waukesha, 1900–1915 ===
Ganfield was licensed to preach by the Presbytery of Cedar Rapids in 1900 and ordained by the Presbytery of Winnebago in 1901. He began his ministerial career as pastor of the First Presbyterian Church in Green Bay, Wisconsin, on May 5, 1901. He spent four years in Green Bay before resigning on July 31, 1904, to become a professor of history and political science at Carroll College (now Carroll University) in Waukesha, Wisconsin. This move came at a time when Carroll was transitioning from a two-year junior college to a four-year college. Ganfield departed Green Bay for Waukesha on August 31, 1904.

In late 1911, Ganfield became the interim pastor of the Congregational Church in Menomonie, Wisconsin. The church offered him the pastorate in full in February 1912; he declined, but agreed to remain on in an interim capacity until at least June of that year. He ultimately remained as pastor until 1914. During part of his time in Waukesha, Ganfield was a fire and police commissioner, a position he resigned from upon leaving for Central. (Note: It is not clear when Ganfield entered into this position, but contemporary newspaper reporting notes that he resigned as commissioner effective September 7, 1915.)

=== Presidency in Danville, 1915–1921 ===
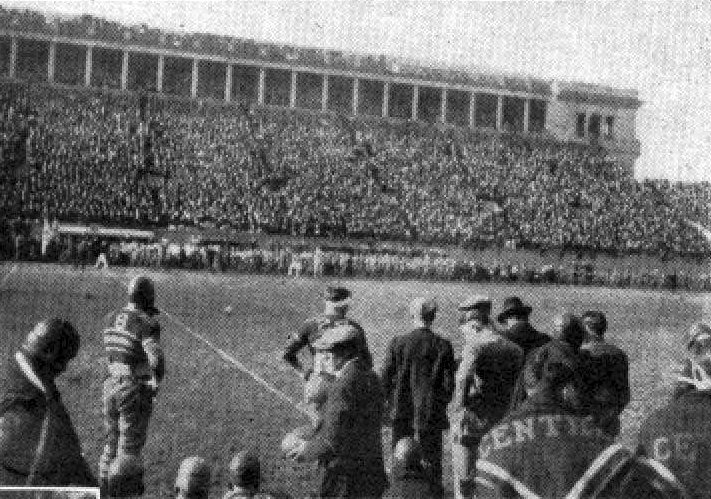
Centre football players on the sideline during their upset win over Harvard in 1921

Ganfield was unanimously elected president of Central University of Kentucky (now Centre College) in Danville, Kentucky, on May 5, 1915. He accepted the position at the following month's board meeting, and his presidency was made effective June 1, 1915. He inherited a college with declining enrollment; Centre historian William Weston wrote that this was partially as a result of decisions made by Ganfield's predecessor, Frederick W. Hinitt, to sever formal ties with the Presbyterian Church in the United States of America (PCUSA; the "Northern Presbyterian Church") for the first time. Those changes were made to gain Central admittance into the Carnegie Foundation for the Advancement of Teaching, which required member schools be "non-sectarian", in 1908. Many of Ganfield's major decisions worked to reverse this to get the school's enrollment and endowment back up. He conducted a fundraiser which was planned for completion in 1919, in time for the college's centennial, though it was not finished until afterward. By 1922, the total amount raised had reached $400,000 (equivalent to $7,690,000 in 2025) and had raised the school's endowment past $1 million for the first time.

Gradually, the school's ties to the church were reinstated; it received funding for teaching of the Bible from the board of education of the PCUSA in 1919 before fully reinstating the church connection in 1921. This change was not without opposition, especially from some of the younger members of the school's board of trustees, but the change went further in specifying that future presidents of the school would be required to be Presbyterian. (Note: The necessity of the president to be Presbyterian had, according to Centre historian William Weston, been "only custom" before, though every president until Michael F. Adams was Presbyterian and only one president before Ganfield, Ormond Beatty, had not been a Presbyterian minister despite the lack of a formal requirement.) Almost immediately, enrollment rebounded; from a low of 80 students in 1915, the school hit 287 in 1921, the first year after church ties were reinstated. Another change took place when the school reverted to the "Centre College" name on December 17, 1918. It had used the name "Central University of Kentucky" since its merger with Central University, of Richmond, Kentucky, in 1901.

Sports, particularly American football, were emphasized during Ganfield's time at Centre. The "Praying Colonels" football team was experiencing national prominence. Ganfield recruited Charley Moran to take over as head coach starting in 1917, and the hiring of Texas high school football coach Robert L. Myers as athletic director meant that his star players Bo McMillin, Red Weaver, and Red Roberts joined him in Danville as members of the football team. The team saw success almost immediately; the 1917 squad lost only one game, the 1918 team went undefeated in a flu-shortened season, and the 1919 team finished undefeated—allowing no more than seven points in any game—and were retroactively recognized as national champions by the Sagarin ratings. The team's success and fame peaked as a result of their October 29, 1921, victory over Harvard, generally viewed as one of the largest upsets in college football history. This athletic success came around the same time as declining academic standards; Centre was dropped from the Association of Colleges and Secondary Schools of Southern States in 1920 and was not restored until 1923.

=== Return to Carroll, 1921–1939 ===
Ganfield took the presidency of Carroll College effective December 1, 1921. He had been Carroll's first choice to replace Wilbur Oscar Carrier when he resigned the presidency in 1917, but Ganfield declined because he was less than two years into his term at Central. Despite this, he was not Carroll's first choice this time; he was offered the job after George McCune, a pastor from New York, declined it. Ganfield's return to Carroll restored a minister to their presidency, as his predecessor, Herbert Pierpont Houghton, had been the school's first lay president. Ganfield had accepted the presidency earlier that year, but his new contract dictated that he would not leave Centre until after the Harvard game. At Carroll, Ganfield worked to restore Carroll's Christian identity and re-integrated religion as a key part of the student experience. Throughout his term, daily chapel attendance was upheld as a requirement for all students, and church attendance remained a requirement for faculty members.

Shortly after returning to Carroll, Ganfield entered the Republican primary for Wisconsin's Class 1 U.S. Senate seat being contested in the 1922 elections. He was defeated by incumbent senator Robert M. La Follette after earning 27.8% of the vote to La Follette's 72.2%; La Follette went on to win the general election in a landslide over the Democratic candidate Jessie Jack Hooper. That same year, Ganfield was elected moderator of the Presbyterian Synod of Wisconsin. He remained involved in politics and was part of Wendell Willkie's platform committee during his run for president of the United States in 1940.

As part of an effort to raise funds and increase Carroll's endowment, Ganfield sought to increase emphasis on athletics in a similar fashion as had been done at Centre. A new gymnasium was constructed at Carroll starting in 1923, though a collapse of the steel framework that November delayed its completion. Its dedication was scheduled for June 12, 1924. He predicted that the school's football team would be beating the team from the University of Wisconsin–Madison within a few years, though this game ultimately never happened. In 1923, Norris Armstrong, a member of the 1921 Centre team, was hired to be Carroll's head coach, and the team went on to win three consecutive Wisconsin Intercollegiate Athletic Association (WIAA) championships from 1925 to 1927. Armstrong also coached the Carroll basketball team to WIAA titles in 1924, 1925, and 1927.

Pensions, a fixed salary scale, and tenure for faculty members were major issues during Ganfield's administration, especially against the backdrop of growing faculty numbers. The school had been operating on a system by which faculty members negotiated their salaries individually, which Ganfield saw as unsatisfactory for both the faculty and the college. The salary scale was established in 1928, with the maximum salary for a full professor set at $3,200 (equivalent to $60,000 in 2025) per year. Solutions to the pension and tenure problems were addressed during the Great Depression, and both in part because of specific incidents with faculty members. The former was resolved in 1937 as a result of government regulation following a 1930 dispute between the board of trustees and a longtime member of the faculty, and the tenure issue was resolved owing to an incident in which a professor was relegated to a non-teaching role against his will. Greek life was prominent at Carroll during Ganfield's tenure; the school hosted four fraternities (Phi Theta Pi, Beta Pi Epsilon, Tau Kappa Epsilon, and Gamma Phi Delta) and four sororities (Beta Chi Theta, Kappa Gamma Phi, Theta Pi Delta, and Alpha Kappa).

By 1927, the school's endowment had reached upwards of $650,000 (equivalent to $12 million in 2025), and enrollment had grown to 430 students two years later. Around that time, the school added several buildings to its campus, including an infirmary, a music building, and a library, in addition to a new wing of the women's dormitory. During the Great Depression, Ganfield wore a red tie during years where the school was in debt ("in the red") and a black tie when the school ran a budget surplus ("in the black"). Despite the economic hardship nationwide, Carroll experienced relative prosperity during this time; with tuition costs at $200 (equivalent to $5,000 in 2025) per student, the college finished with surpluses on multiple occasions, received a record number of applications, and maintained steady enrollment. By the time of Ganfield's resignation, the endowment had reached $800,000 (equivalent to $18.5 million in 2025).

Carroll's enrollment had reached 500 students by 1935, and that academic year also saw faculty salaries receive a slight increase. By the end of his term, the school had 33 faculty members and a requirement that they must earn a master's degree. Despite these standards, Carroll's effort to establish a chapter of the Phi Beta Kappa honor society was rejected in 1935. Ganfield retired effective July 1, 1939, due to poor health. Gerrit T. Vander Lugt, a member of the Carroll faculty, was chosen to replace Ganfield as acting president and was later elevated to the full position, becoming Ganfield's successor in June 1940.

== Personal life and death ==
Cooper Ganfield Hall at Centre

Ganfield married Clara Boardman on August 27, 1901, and the couple had five children.

During his career, Ganfield was a member of the board of trustees of the Louisville Presbyterian Theological Seminary, the YMCA of Kentucky executive committee, the Kentucky Sunday School Association state board, and the International Sunday School Association. Ganfield's name is given to one part of Cooper Ganfield Hall, a dormitory building at Centre, and Ganfield Gymnasium, a recreation center at Carroll. Carroll's first-year William A. Ganfield Fellow Scholarship is also named for him. Ganfield was a member of the Knights Templar and was elected grand commander of the Wisconsin chapter in 1931.

Ganfield died on October 18, 1940, at Presbyterian Hospital in Chicago.

== Notes ==
Academic offices
Preceded by Frederick W. Hinitt; John W. Redd (interim)	President of Centre College; 1915 — 1921	Succeeded by R. Ames Montgomery
Preceded by Herbert Pierpont Houghton	President of Carroll College; 1921 — 1939	Succeeded by Gerrit T. Vander Lugt
