= San Diego East-West Christmas Classic =

The San Diego East-West Christmas Classic was an annual college football bowl game held in San Diego, California, in 1921 and 1922. The game was played at Balboa Stadium.

== Game results ==
| Date | Winner | | Loser | | Location | Notes |
|---|---|---|---|---|---|---|
| December 26, 1921 | Centre | 38 | Arizona | 0 | San Diego, CA | notes |
| December 25, 1922 | West Virginia | 21 | Gonzaga | 13 | San Diego, CA | notes |

== See also ==
- List of college bowl games
