= Herb Covington =

American athlete (1902–1990)

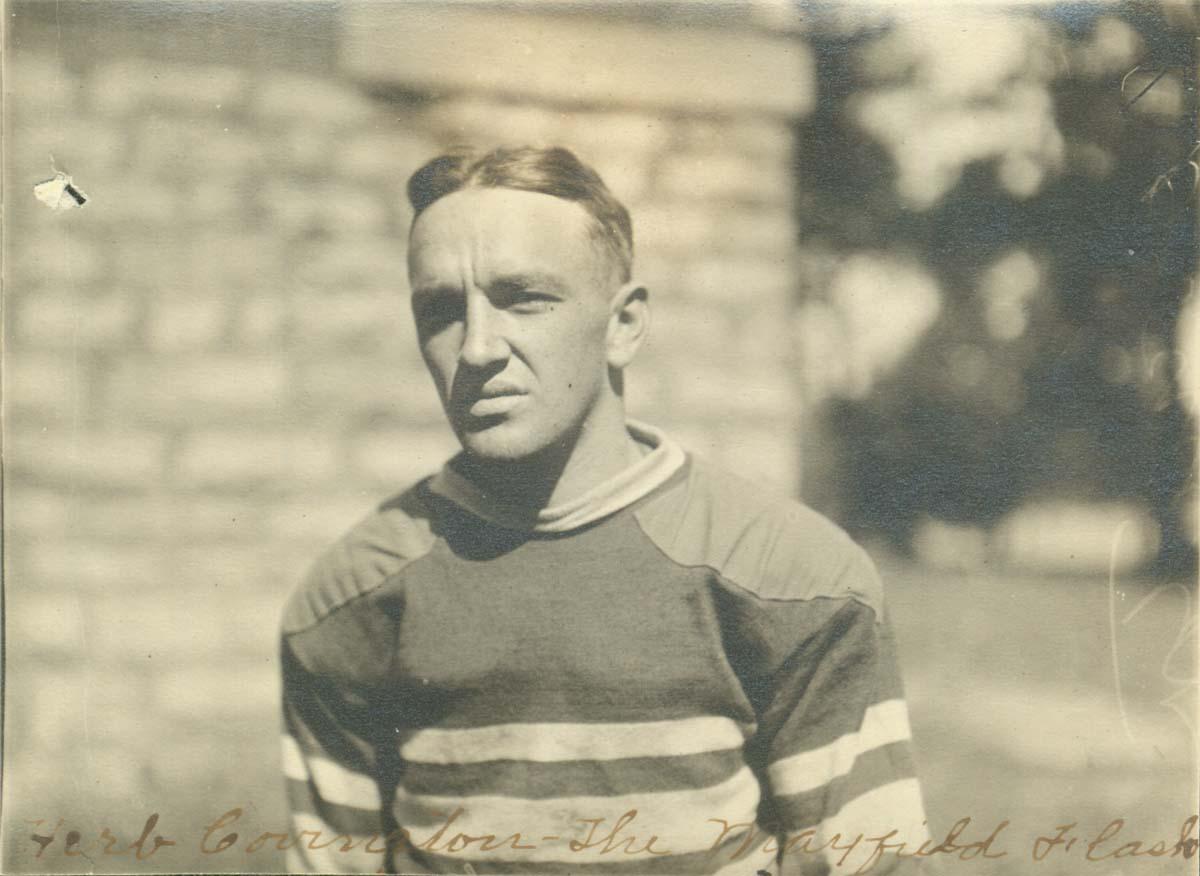
- "Flash" Covington c. 1921

No. 15
- Position: Quarterback / Running back

Personal information
- Born: October 16, 1902; Mayfield, Kentucky, U.S.
- Died: January 1, 1990 (aged 87); Aurora, Ohio, U.S.
- Listed height: 5 ft 5 in (1.65 m)
- Listed weight: 158 lb (72 kg)

Career information
- High school: Mayfield; Castle Heights
- College: Centre (1921–1924)

Awards and highlights
- SIAA championship (1921); Southern championship (1924); All-Southern (1921, 1922, 1923, 1924); Second-team All-American (1922); Third-team All-American (1924); All-time Centre team

Herbert Hunt "Flash" Covington (October 16, 1902 – January 1, 1990), also called "the Mayfield Flash", was an American football, basketball, and baseball player for the Centre Praying Colonels of Centre College in Danville, Kentucky.

== Early life ==
Covington spent a year at Mayfield High and two at Castle Heights Military Academy.

== Centre College ==
=== Football ===
Covington was a prominent running back for coaches Charley Moran and Robert L. Myers's Centre Colonels from 1921 to 1924, chosen as a running back on Centre's all-time football team in 1935.

==== 1921 ====
Covington played at halfback during the 6–0 victory over Harvard. Bo McMillin threw a touchdown to Covington in the 1922 Dixie Classic which Centre lost to Texas A&M.

==== 1922 ====
Taking over for McMillin at quarterback the following season, Covington did not miss a minute of play over the next three years. He was selected All-Southern in 1922. That year Covington kicked a then-record six straight drop-kicked field goals in the victory over Louisville. In a rematch with Harvard, a 24 to 10 loss, "Covington, the Centre quarterback, was responsible for most of the scoring in the game; he kicked Centre's goal from the field, and through Roberts's assistance, made Centre's touchdown; his errors led to the Harvard scores also." He was selected All-American in 1922 by Billy Evans and was on Norman E. Brown's second team. In 1924 he was selected as a third-team All-American by Davis J. Walsh of the International News Service. Athletic trainer Alfred Doneghy said Covington was the best runner Centre ever had.

An account of his six field goal record follows:

"Herb Covington, who has shattered records galore this season through his ground gaining ability, established a world record today for field goals by drop kicks in a single game. Six times he booted the oval over the crossbar, three of them from the 30 yard mark and one from the 41 yard line. The others were from between the 30 and 40 yard marks. The record previously was held by B. W. Tafford, Harvard, and W. H. Eckersall, University of Chicago, jointly with five in a single game. Robertson of Purdue made seven goals in a game with Rose Poly in 1900, but they were all from placement."

==== 1924 ====
Centre defeated Georgia 14 to 7 and Wallace Wade's Alabama and claims a Southern championship.

== Marriage ==
He married Eleanor Blanche McCormick of Senatobia, Mississippi, and was a realtor in Florida.

== Coaching career ==
Covington was coach of the Hillsborough High School Terriers in Tampa in 1925. Jimmy Steele was on the team.
