= George M. Chinn =

American firearms expert and Marine officer

George M. Chinn

George Morgan Chinn (January 15, 1902 – September 4, 1987) was an American firearms expert, author, and a colonel of the United States Marine Corps. He attended Centre College, and played on the 1921 Centre Praying Colonels football team, which won the national championship. Chinn then opened a diner in a cave, known as 'Chinn's Cave House' or simply The Cave House, which also functioned as an underground gambling center. He served as the bodyguard of Happy Chandler while he was governor of Kentucky. Chinn was also Sergeant at Arms for the Kentucky Legislature. Later he was the production line inspector for several weapons manufacturers, and eventually a Marine. He designed the Mk 19 grenade launcher.

Eventually one of the United States' premier arms experts, Bill Bright, said of him, "He did for military weapons what Wozniak and Gates did for computers. He added the right pieces to make them reliable and usable. He was what was then called a garage (in his case, cave) inventor." Chinn retired to become director of the Kentucky Historical Society from 1960 to 1973, and later the Kentucky Military History Museum.

At the request of the Department of the Navy, Chinn would author a five-volume book series titled "The Machine Gun," described by the National Rifle Association as a "...fund of knowledge on a topic of increasing importance at a time of national emergency."

== Early life ==
Chinn was born on January 15, 1902, to George P. Chinn—the warden of a state penitentiary—and Anna Chinn née Carlisle, who would die eight years later. His grandfather, John Pendleton Chinn, was a member of the Kentucky State Legislature. He grew up in Mundy's Landing, Kentucky. Chinn attended Braxton Hall and Millersburg Military Institute, both of which he disliked. At the Military Institute, he set a state record in the javelin throw. Though he would not graduate until 1920, in December 1918, Chinn was to have been commissioned as an officer in France, but World War I ended before he could.

While at Centre College, Chinn played football and wrote, among other places, in the local newspaper, The Advocate. Playing as a lineman, Chinn started games in 1920 and 1921, though, as a result of constant injuries he often served as an assistant coach. He worked as a golf salesman for Lowe and Campbell Athletic Goods before leaving Centre to be assistant coach with Charley Moran at Bucknell University. Chinn left to coach at Wesleyan University, and later Catawba University (at the latter of which he was often in practice the head coach). By 1930, Chinn was recognized as one of the best college football coaches in the country.

Chinn hired a man known as Tunnel Smith to help him build a diner in a cave, which he called 'The Cave House'. The restaurant soon proved immensely popular, attracting thousands of people. On the side, he ran an illegal slot machine operation and liquor business. When arrested, Chinn was acquitted as he argued it was not an illegal game of chance, because it was impossible to win. He was also involved in restoring a ferry known as the Iron Duke.

== Military ==
Unemployed, Chinn turned to his old friend, at the time governor of Kentucky, Happy Chandler. He served as a tour guide, and Sergeant at Arms for the Kentucky State Legislature. He got to know the capitol and its workings well enough that some thought he should run for governor. Chinn later served as the bodyguard for Chandler and Jack Dempsey when he spent time in Kentucky. In 1939, he took a job as a weapons consultant to the army. Eager to serve in the war, Chinn demanded to Chandler that he be allowed to join the Marines. He objected, saying "You're over forty years old, and you weigh 330 pounds! You'll get in the way and you’ll get killed, and you’ll get other people killed, too. Go home!" Eventually, Chandler relented. He was 118 pounds over the weight limit, and ten years over the age limit.

Chinn received basic training at Quantico, Virginia, and was then stationed at Fort Knox and Cherry Point. He made a series of improvements to the Browning .50 caliber machine gun, impressing his superiors. Chinn was then assigned to respond to questions regarding various guns. He worked on weaponry at the Naval Air Test Center, the Navy Proving Grounds, the Naval Aviation Ordnance Testing Station and Naval Air Weapons Station China Lake. In 1945 Chinn travelled to the Pacific Theatre, inspecting capabilities of the Marines. At the end of the war, Chinn, by then a colonel, was one of the most prominent weapons experts in the Marines.

From 1946 to 1956, Chinn worked on a five-volume, 500,000-word history of the machine gun. He also worked extensively on the twenty-millimeter turret. During the Korean War, he was assigned to Seoul and Tokyo. He worked extensively on the Mk 19 grenade launcher.

He retired from the Marine Corps as a colonel in 1962.

== Bibliography ==
- Jackson, Carlton (2015). Kentucky Maverick: The Life and Adventures of Colonel George M. Chinn. The University Press of Kentucky. ISBN 9780813161075 – via Project MUSE.
