= 1921 San Diego East-West Christmas Classic =

Centre Praying Colonels	Arizona Wildcats
(9–0)	(7–1)
38	0
Head coach: Charley Moran	Head coach: Pop McKale
	1	2	3	4	Total
Centre	12	6	7	13	38
Arizona	0	0	0	0	0
- Date: December 26, 1921
- Season: 1921
- Stadium: Balboa Stadium
- Location: San Diego, California

The 1921 San Diego East-West Christmas Classic was a college football postseason bowl game between the Centre Praying Colonels and the Arizona Wildcats. The Colonels beat the Wildcats 38-0 in the first ever Christmas Classic.

== Background ==
Southern Intercollegiate Athletic Association champion Centre was undefeated going into this game. Their upset over Harvard is considered one of the greatest upsets in college history. Arizona was in their first bowl game, led by Harold "Nosey" McClellan and his 124 points doing the scoring.

== Game summary ==
Red Roberts scored the first touchdown five minutes into the match. Bo McMillin went over the right tackle for another score. Centre led 18-0 at the half as Arizona was held to no first downs in two quarters of play. Arizona made an attempt to drive towards a score, but Centre intercepted an Arizona pass to keep the side scoreless. Centre's potent attack and relentless defense stifled the Wildcats. Herb Covington scored on a punt return and a sweep to seal the victory.

== Aftermath ==
This was Centre's final bowl win. It played in the 1922 Dixie Classic a week later, but lost to Texas A&M in the game that started the latter's 12th Man tradition.

Arizona would have to wait until 1949 to make another bowl game and 1986 to win one.
