= Cliff Lemon =

American football player (1901–1955)

Profile
- Position: E

Personal information
- Born: April 15, 1901; Paducah, Kentucky
- Died: November 9, 1955 (aged 54); Louisville, Kentucky
- Listed height: 5 ft 9 in (1.75 m)
- Listed weight: 190 lb (86 kg)

Career information
- High school: Mayfield
- College: Centre College

Career history
- Centre Praying Colonels (1921–1924); Chicago Bears (1926)

Awards and highlights
- All-Southern (1922)

Clifton Wilson "Hennie" Lemon (April 15, 1901 – November 9, 1955) was an American football end in the National Football League (NFL). Lemon played college football for the Centre Praying Colonels of Centre College, including the 6 to 0 upset of Harvard. He caught a 35-yard touchdown pass in the game against Kentucky. Lemon was selected All-Southern in 1922. He played in the NFL for the Chicago Bears.
