= John Tanner (American football, born 1897) =

American football player (1897–1976)

Profile
- Position: Wingback

Personal information
- Born: December 3, 1897; Owensboro, Kentucky, U.S.
- Died: December 23, 1976 (aged 79); Owensboro, Kentucky, U.S.
- Listed height: 5 ft 5 in (1.65 m)
- Listed weight: 165 lb (75 kg)

Career information
- College: Centre

Career history
- Toledo Maroons (1922); Cleveland Indians (1923); Cleveland Bulldogs (1924)
- Stats at Pro Football Reference

John Portor "Hump" Tanner (December 3, 1897 – December 23, 1976) was an American professional football player in the early National Football League (NFL) with the Toledo Maroons, Cleveland Indians and Cleveland Bulldogs. He began his football playing at Owensboro High School. He then played at the college level for Centre College.

He played for the Praying Colonels in the infamous 1921 Centre vs. Harvard football game. The Colonels (under coach Charley Moran) shocked Harvard University and became the first school ever from outside the East to beat one of the Ivy League's "Big Three" of Harvard, Yale, and Princeton.

Tanner was a teammate as well as close friend of Jim Thorpe, who was considered the greatest athlete of his era.
