= Terry Snoddy =

American football player

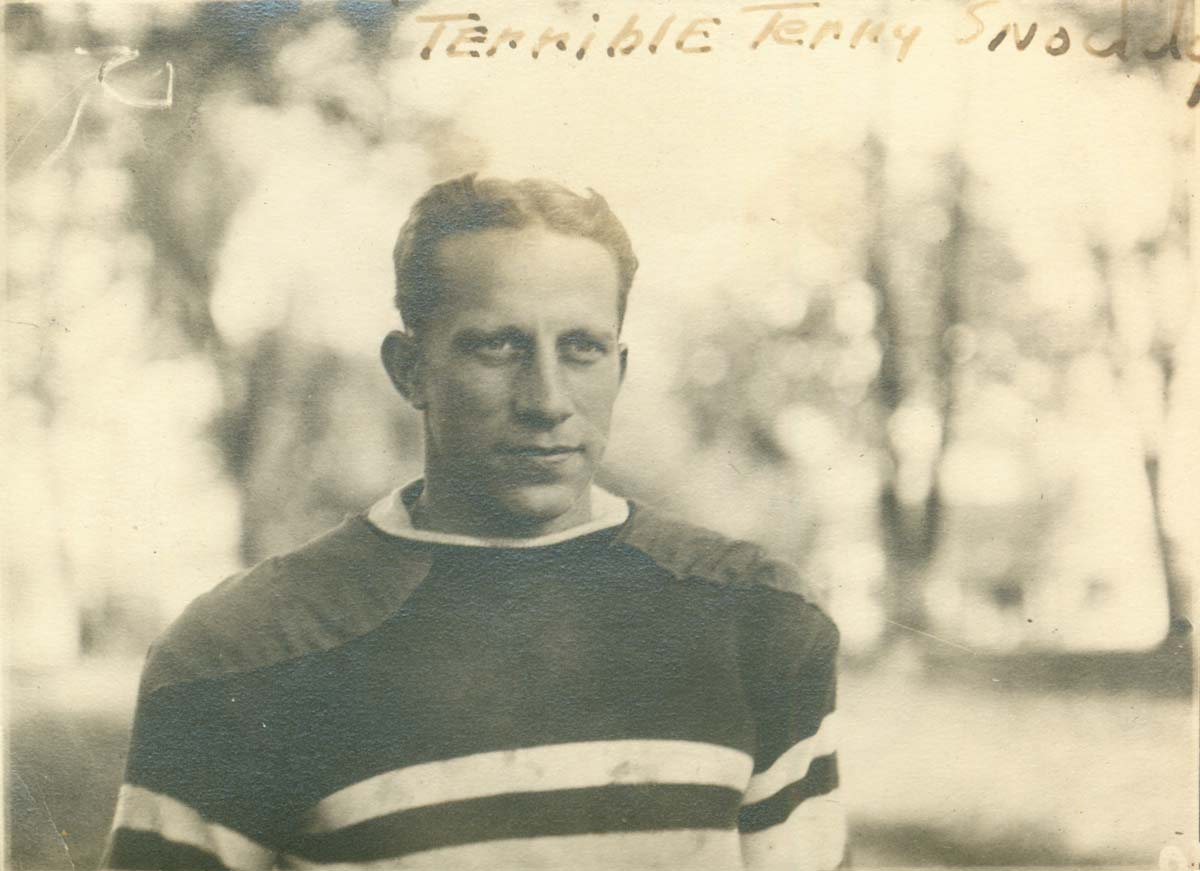
- "Terrible Terry Snowday"

No. 12
- Position: End/Halfback

Personal information
- Born: March 18, 1899; Owensboro, Kentucky, U.S.
- Listed height: 5 ft 10 in (1.78 m)
- Listed weight: 175 lb (79 kg)

Career information
- High school: Owensboro
- College: Centre (1919–1922)

Awards and highlights
- SIAA championship (1919, 1921); All-Southern (1919, 1920, 1921, 1922)

Hall Terry Snoddy (March 18, 1899 – October 1968) also known as Terry Snowday was an American college football player.

== Early life ==
Hall Terry Snoddy was born on March 18, 1899, in Owensboro, Kentucky, to Carey Snoddy and Ruth Hall.

== Centre College ==
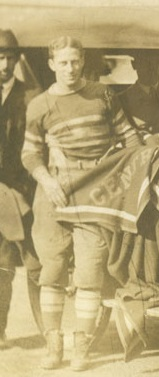
Snoddy holding blanket the day before the historic defeat of Harvard.

Snoddy was a prominent end and halfback for the Centre Praying Colonels of Centre College in Danville, Kentucky; a member of two of its most famous teams in 1919 and 1921. Snoddy was selected to at least one All-Southern team every year he played.

=== 1919 ===
The 1919 team went undefeated and was named a national champion by Sagarin.

=== 1921 ===
The 1921 team beat Harvard 6–0 in one of the greatest upsets in college football history. One account reads "Snoddy, Centre's left halfback, was literally a "John-on-the-spot" in getting under the ball. And it was Snoddy who gained when the gaining counted, by his superior speed." The Colonels then played a postseason bowl game against Texas A&M known as the 1922 Dixie Classic. Snoddy scored Centre's first touchdown in the game. Centre would lose 22 to 14.

=== 1922 ===
In 1922 he changed his name to Snowday, the original Scottish spelling.
