= 1922 Dixie Classic =

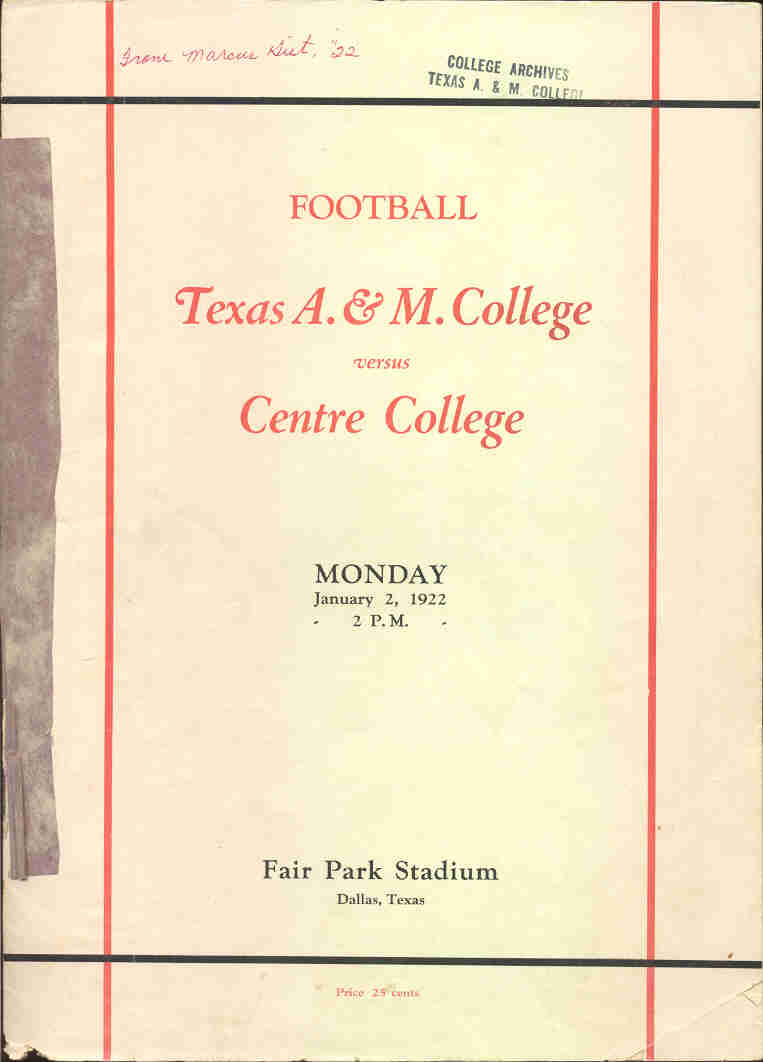
Centre Praying Colonels	Texas A&M Aggies
(10–0)	(5–1–2)
SIAA	SWC
14	22
Head coach: Charley Moran	Head coach: Dana X. Bible
	1	2	3	4	Total
Centre	0	0	7	7	14
Texas A&M	2	0	14	6	22
- Date: January 2, 1922
- Season: 1921
- Stadium: Fair Park
- Location: Dallas, Texas
- Attendance: 20,000

The 1922 Dixie Classic (Note: The "Dixie Classic" name was not used until the January 1925 edition of the game.) was a post-season college football bowl game between the Texas A&M Aggies and the Centre College Praying Colonels on January 2, 1922, at Fair Park Stadium in Dallas, Texas. Texas A&M defeated Centre 22–14. It is also the game in which Texas A&M's 12th man tradition originated.

Centre came into the game undefeated, outscoring its opponents by a margin of 314 to 6. It also upset Harvard in the regular season in what was later deemed one of the greatest upsets in college football history. A&M finished its regular season 5–1–2 and captured a Southwest Conference title.

== Game summary ==
Texas A&M halfback Sammy Sanders received the opening kickoff from Centre kicker Red Roberts, returning it for 45 yards. After the first down of A&M's first drive, Aggie running back and team captain Heinie Weir suffered a leg injury after getting tackled to the ground. He was moved to the sidelines. After the injury, A&M failed to gain any yards, and was forced to punt. A&M punter Tom Miller punted the ball, which was eventually caught by Tom Bartlett, who was stationed behind his goal line. Bartlett, who tried to run the ball, was immediately tackled by Fred Wilson for a safety. A&M put up two points on the scoreboard to lead Centre. Centre had never trailed in a game all season.

Centre's offensive line gave injuries to Aggie players Sanders and A. B. Morris, who were removed from the field. The Aggies played with four substitute defenders.

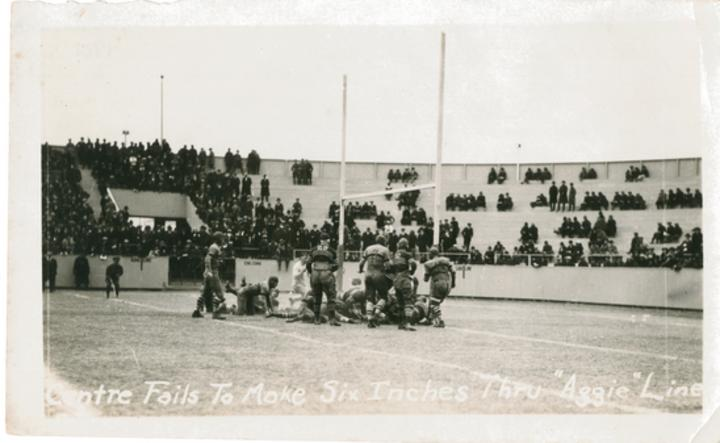
Centre fails to gain six inches to score a touchdown before the end of the first half

Before the half ended, Centre reached A&M's two-yard line. Centre's Red Roberts and Herb Covington attempted to run through for a touchdown, but were stopped by the A&M defense line. On fourth down, Roberts was stopped at the A&M six-inch mark. Referee Ernie Quigley marked the ball at the two-inch line for the Aggies. The half ended with A&M maintaining its 2–0 lead.

During halftime, A&M head coach Dana X. Bible, after noticing the injuries on the team, called E. King Gill to the A&M bench. Gill, a reserve player who had left the A&M football squad at the end of the regular season to play basketball, was assisting sports editor Jinx Tucker in pointing out players in the press box of the stadium. Bible ordered Gill, who was in civilian clothes, to put on a football uniform in case he was needed to play in the game. Gill put on the uniform of Heine Weir, one of the injured football players, underneath the stands, since there were no dressing rooms, while Weir put on Gill's civilian clothes. Gill stood on the sidelines during the second half ready to go in, but ultimately was not called by Bible as the starting roster managed to finish, although Gill was the only substitute player available by the end of the game. However, Gill's readiness to play began the storied Twelfth Man tradition.

Once the third period started, Centre was forced to punt after they failed to gain yards on their first drive of the second half. The Aggies took over on downs, but fumbled on their first play. Centre recovered the ball on the A&M three-yard line. Centre fullback Terry Snoddy rushed in for a touchdown. Centre scored an extra point to put the score at 7–2.

After Centre's first score, A&M coach Bible chose to kick off. Centre received the ball, though fumbled it, causing three A&M tacklers to fall on the return player. Cap Murrah recovered the ball at the Centre thirty-three yard line. On A&M's possession, Puny Wilson threw the ball to Jack Evans for a touchdown. A&M restored their lead to 9–7 after scoring the extra point.

Centre fumbled the ball again on their ensuing possession, allowing the Aggies to recover it on Centre's twenty-four yard line. A&M's Miller rushed to the fourteen-yard line for a first down, and Billy McMillan chalked up five more yards. End Puny Wilson ran for a touchdown on the next down to extend the Aggies' lead to 16–7.

Once Centre got the ball again, their hopes of a comeback failed as Aggie defensive tackle Ted Winn intercepted a ball and ran forty-five yards for another A&M touchdown, increasing the score to 22–7. Centre would score a touchdown afterwards, but the game soon ended 22–14.

== Sources ==
- Schoor, Gene (1994). The Fightin' Texas Aggies: 100 Years of A&M Football. Dallas, Texas: Taylor Publishing Company. ISBN 978-0878338603.
