= Tom Moran (blocking back) =

American football player (1899–1933)

No. 88
- Position: Blocking back

Personal information
- Born: December 10, 1899; Nashville, Tennessee, U.S.
- Died: July 4, 1933 (aged 33); Horse Cave, Kentucky, U.S.
- Listed height: 5 ft 8 in (1.73 m)
- Listed weight: 175 lb (79 kg)

Career information
- High school: Horse Cave (Kentucky)
- College: Centre

Career history
- New York Giants (1925)
- Stats at Pro Football Reference

Tom McGee Moran (December 10, 1899 – July 4, 1933) was an American professional football blocking back who played one season with the New York Giants of the National Football League (NFL). He played college football at Centre College.

== Early life and college ==
Tom McGee Moran was born on December 10, 1899, in Nashville, Tennessee. He attended Horse Cave High School in Horse Cave, Kentucky.

Moran was a two-year letterman for the Centre Praying Colonels of Centre College from 1920 to 1921.

== Professional career ==
Moran spent a few years playing minor league baseball after his college football career. He played in one game for the New York Giants of the National Football League (NFL) during the team's inaugural 1925 season. He wore jersey number 8 while with the Giants. He stood 5'8" and weighed 175 pounds.

== Coaching career ==
Prior to his playing career in the NFL, Moran was the head coach at Carson–Newman University in Jefferson City, Tennessee from 1922 to 1923. He was also the interim coach of the Frankford Yellow Jackets for the first two games of the 1927 NFL season while his father, Charley Moran, officiated the 1927 World Series.

== Personal life ==
Moran became a tobacco buyer after his sports career. He died of a self-inflicted gunshot wound to the chest at his home in Horse Cave, Kentucky on July 4, 1933. He had been in ill health for several years.

Moran's father, Charley Moran, was a Major League Baseball player and college football coach.
