= The Advocate-Messenger =

Newspaper in Danville, Kentucky

- Type: Daily newspaper
- Format: Broadsheet
- Owner: Carpenter Media Group
- Publisher: Joe Imel
- Editor: Warren Taylor
- Founded: 1865
- Language: English
- Headquarters: 461 South 4th St., Danville, KY 40422; United States
- Circulation: 9,121 Afternoon; 9,093 Sunday
- Website: amnews.com

The Advocate-Messenger is a newspaper published Tuesday and Saturday in Danville, Kentucky. The printed version of the newspaper is delivered by US mail. The newspaper serves central Kentucky, with distribution primarily in Boyle, Lincoln, Casey, Mercer, and Garrard counties.

== History ==
- The Kentucky Advocate began publication in Danville on June 24, 1865, as a Democratic party supporter.
- The Kentucky Tribune began publication in Danville in 1843 as a Whig party supporter, later changing to a Republican party supporter. In 1887 it was renamed The Danville Democrat and in 1893, renamed again to The Danville News. In 1907, it merged into The Kentucky Advocate.
- The Boyle County Herald began publication in Danville in the 1880s and merged into The Kentucky Advocate in 1907.
- The Daily Messenger began publication in Danville in 1910.
- The Advocate-Messenger is the result of the merger in 1940 of The Kentucky Advocate and The Daily-Messenger.
- The paper was purchased by Schurz Communications of South Bend, Indiana in 1978.
- In 2013, Advocate Messenger printing operations moved from Danville to Winchester Kentucky.
- Boone Newspapers formed a subsidiary, Bluegrass Newsmedia LLC. In 2016, the subsidiary purchased the paper in 2016 along with The Winchester Sun, The Jessamine Journal, and The Interior Journal.
- In 2020, the four Bluegrass Newsmedia papers eliminated their sports staffs, which were mostly one-person departments. A column in the Winchester Sun noted that "Most people seeking news about high school and youth sports get that information immediately by attending the games, via social media or through web sites like MaxPreps and others. The days of the newspaper needing to write long narrative recaps of every sporting contest are gone." The newspapers plan to continue sports coverage via reader submissions and human interest pieces.
