= Gus King =

American football player (1896–1957)

No. 24
- Position: End/Halfback

Personal information
- Born: September 28, 1896; Reno, Texas, U.S.
- Died: October 17, 1957 (aged 61); Humboldt, Tennessee, U.S.
- Listed height: 5 ft 11 in (1.80 m)
- Listed weight: 180 lb (82 kg)

Career information
- High school: Fleming Co. (KY)
- College: Texas; Centre

Career history
- Toledo Maroons (1922)

Career statistics
- Games played: 3
- Games started: 2
- Stats at Pro Football Reference

Paul Augustus King (September 28, 1896 – October 17, 1957) was an American football end and halfback who played one season in the National Football League (NFL) for the Toledo Maroons. He played college football for Texas and Centre.

King was born on September 28, 1896, in Reno, Texas. He attended Fleming County High School in Kentucky, before moving back to join University of Texas. He played on their redshirt team during 1917, but left the school afterwards. He joined Centre University in 1920, earning a varsity letter.

In 1922, after being out of football the prior year, King was signed by the Toledo Maroons of the National Football League (NFL). He appeared in three total games with them, being a starter in two. He played the end position as well as halfback, and wore number 24. The Maroons ended the season with a 5–2–2 record, placing fourth in the league. He was not on their roster in the following year, finishing his career with three games played.

King died on October 17, 1957, in Humboldt, Tennessee. He was 61 at the time of his death.
