= William Shadoan =

American football, basketball, and baseball coach and military officer

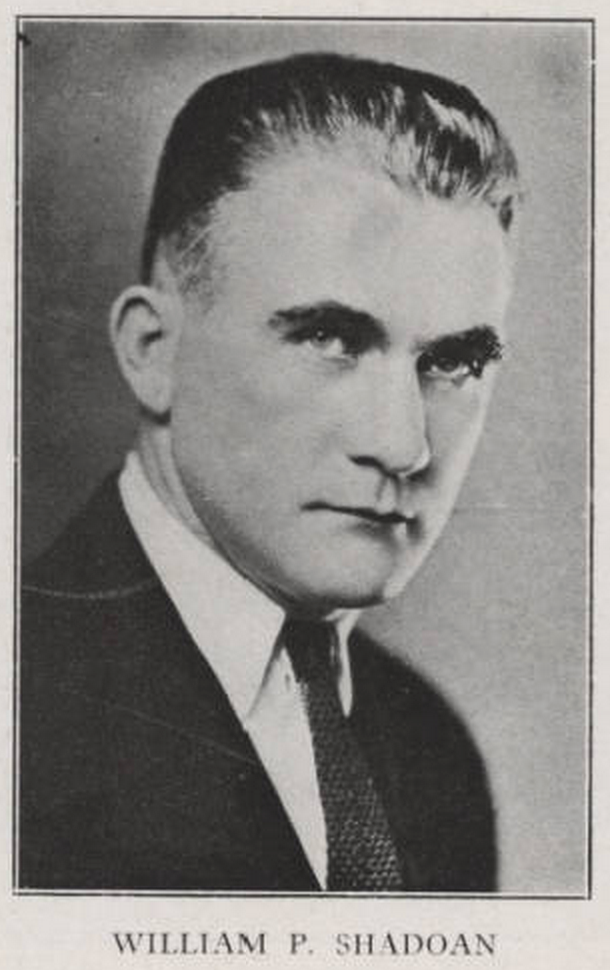
- Pictured in The Record 1924, Valparaiso yearbook

Biographical details
- Born: December 8, 1894; Somerset, Kentucky, U.S.
- Died: June 20, 1974 (aged 79); Cape Girardeau, Missouri, U.S.

Playing career

Football
- 1921: Centre
- Position: Guard

Coaching career (HC unless noted)

Football
- 1923–1924: Valparaiso

Basketball
- 1923–1925: Valparaiso

Head coaching record
- Overall: 9–5–3 (football); 33–9 (basketball)

William Parker Shadoan (December 8, 1894 – June 20, 1974) was an American football, basketball, and baseball coach and military officer. He served as head football, basketball, and baseball coach at Valparaiso University during the 1923–24 and 1924–25 academic years. Shadoan attended Centre College in Danville, Kentucky, where he played college football as a guard on the 1921 Centre Praying Colonels football team. He served in the United States Army during the Pancho Villa Expedition and with the American Expeditionary Forces in France during World War I. He reached the rank of colonel and later served as the superintendent of a number of military schools.

== Head coaching record ==
=== Football ===
Year	Team	Overall	Conference	Standing	Bowl/playoffs
Valparaiso Crusaders (Independent) (1923)
1923	Valparaiso	5–2–1			
Valparaiso Crusaders (Western Interstate Conference) (1924)
1924	Valparaiso	4–3–2	1–1–1	T–2nd	
Valparaiso:		9–5–3	1–1–1		
Total:		9–5–3			
