= Ben Cregor =

American football player and coach (1898–1968)

Biographical details
- Born: January 31, 1898; Springfield, Kentucky, U.S.
- Died: February 20, 1968 (aged 70)

Playing career
- 1918–1922: Centre
- Positions: Guard, tackle

Coaching career (HC unless noted)
- 1933–1935: Louisville

Accomplishments and honors

Awards
- All-Southern (1921)

Benjamin Woodbury Cregor (January 31, 1898 - February 20, 1968) was a college football player and coach.

== Early life ==
Benjamin Woodbury Cregor was born on January 31, 1898. He served in the U. S. Army during World War I.

== Playing career ==
Cregor was a prominent guard and tackle for the Centre Praying Colonels from 1918 to 1922, one of its "Seven Mustangs" on the line. He was selected All-Southern in 1921, the same year Centre beat Harvard.

== Coaching career ==
Cregor coached the Louisville Cardinals football team from 1933 to 1935.

== Later life ==
Cregor died on February 29, 1968.

== Head coaching record ==
Year	Team	Overall	Conference	Standing	Bowl/playoffs
Louisville Cardinals (Southern Intercollegiate Athletic Association) (1933–1935)
1933	Louisville	1–7	1–6	28th	
1934	Louisville	2–5	2–3	T–20th	
1935	Louisville	1–6–1	1–4	T–26th	
Louisville:		4–18–1	4–13		
Total:		4–18–1			
