= Norris Armstrong =

American football and basketball player and coach (1898–1981)

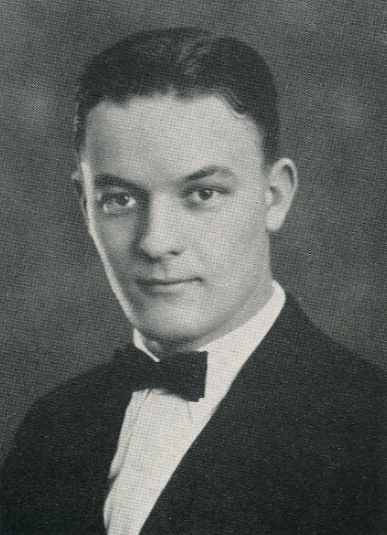
- Armstrong pictured in The Hinakaga 1925, Carroll College yearbook

Biographical details
- Born: September 15, 1898; Texarkana, Arkansas, U.S.
- Died: October 11, 1981 (aged 83); Danville, Kentucky, U.S.

Playing career

Football
- 1918–1921: Centre
- 1922: Milwaukee Badgers
- Positions: Tackle, halfback

Coaching career (HC unless noted)

Football
- 1922: Centenary (assistant)
- 1923–1930: Carroll (WI)

Basketball
- 1923–1929: Carroll (WI)

Administrative career (AD unless noted)
- 1923–1929: Carroll (WI)

Head coaching record
- Overall: 44–11–6 (football); 60–20 (basketball)

Accomplishments and honors

Awards
- Football; All-Southern (1919); All-time Centre team

Phillip Norris "Army" Armstrong (September 15, 1898 – October 11, 1981) was an American football and basketball player and coach. He played college football at Centre College in Danville, Kentucky, from 1918 to 1919 and professionally for one season, in 1922, with the Milwaukee Badgers of the National Football League (NFL). Armstong served as the head football coach at Carroll College—now known as Carroll University—Waukesha, Wisconsin from 1923 to 1930, compiling a record of 44–11–6.

== Playing career ==
=== Centre ===
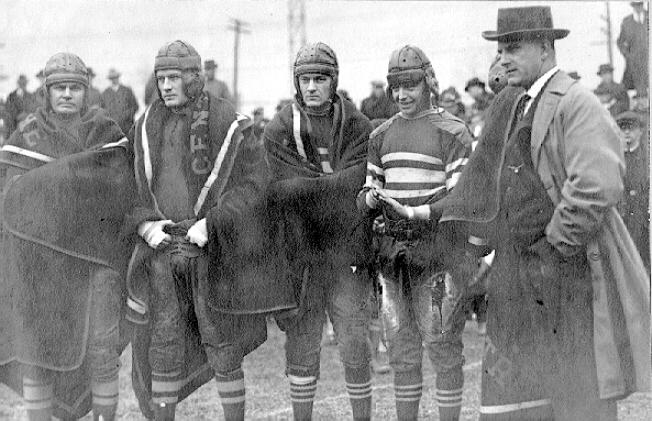
Centre after defeat of West Virginia in 1919. Armstrong is in the center.

Norris played tackle and halfback for Centre College in Danville, Kentucky and was a key offensive player during the 1921 Centre vs. Harvard football game, and was captain of the team that year. He was also a player on the school's basketball team. Centre College honored his contribution to the school's athletic program by inducting him into the college's Athletic Hall of Fame. He was a halfback on Centre's all-time football team chosen in 1935.

=== Milwaukee Badgers ===
After graduation from Centre, Norris played professionally for the 1922 season as a tackle for the Milwaukee Badgers of the National Football League (NFL) alongside his college teammate Bo McMillin.

== Coaching career ==
=== Centenary ===
In the fall of 1922, Armstrong went to Centenary College of Louisiana in Shreveport, Louisiana to assist McMillin in coaching the football team.

=== Carroll (WI) ===
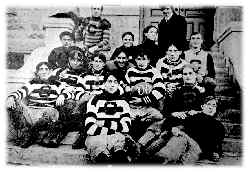
Carroll Pioneers, c. 1920

After one year as an assistant coach, Armstrong was hired as the head football coach and athletic director at Carroll College—now known as Carroll University—in Waukesha, Wisconsin, succeeding Matty Bell. He coached Carroll's football team for eight seasons, from 1923 to 1930, leading his teams to a record of 44–11–6. Armstrong was also the head basketball coach at Carroll from 1923 to 1929, tallying a mark of 60–20.

Armstrong oversaw one of the most successful periods of the football team at the college. The university honored his contributions by inducting him into the school's "Hall of Fame" in 1973. Key games for Carroll under Armstrong included the 1925 victory over Great Lakes Naval by a score of 73–0, and an undefeated 1925 season. The program never had anything but winning seasons under Armstrong, with the worst record being 4–3 in 1929; the worst loss that year was a 46–0 defeat by the Iowa Hawkeyes.

Armstong resigned as Carroll football coach after the 1930 season to focus on his business as manager of the Central Wholesale Company in Danville.

== Later life and death ==
Armstrong was later a wholesale grocer and a member of the Danville Chamber of Commerce. He died on October 11, 1981, at Ephraim McDowell Memorial Hospital in Danville. His wife, Porter Hudson Armstrong, died the following day.

== Head coaching record ==
=== Football ===
Year	Team	Overall	Conference	Standing	Bowl/playoffs
Carroll Pioneers (Big Four Conference) (1923–1930)
1923	Carroll	5–3			
1924	Carroll	6–1–1			
1925	Carroll	8–0		1st	
1926	Carroll	5–1–2		1st	
1927	Carroll	6–1–1		1st	
1928	Carroll	5–1–1		1st	
1929	Carroll	4–3			
1930	Carroll	5–1–1		1st	
Carroll:		44–11–6			
Total:		44–11–6			
National championship Conference title Conference division title or championship game berth
