= Charley Moran =

American sportsman (1878–1949)

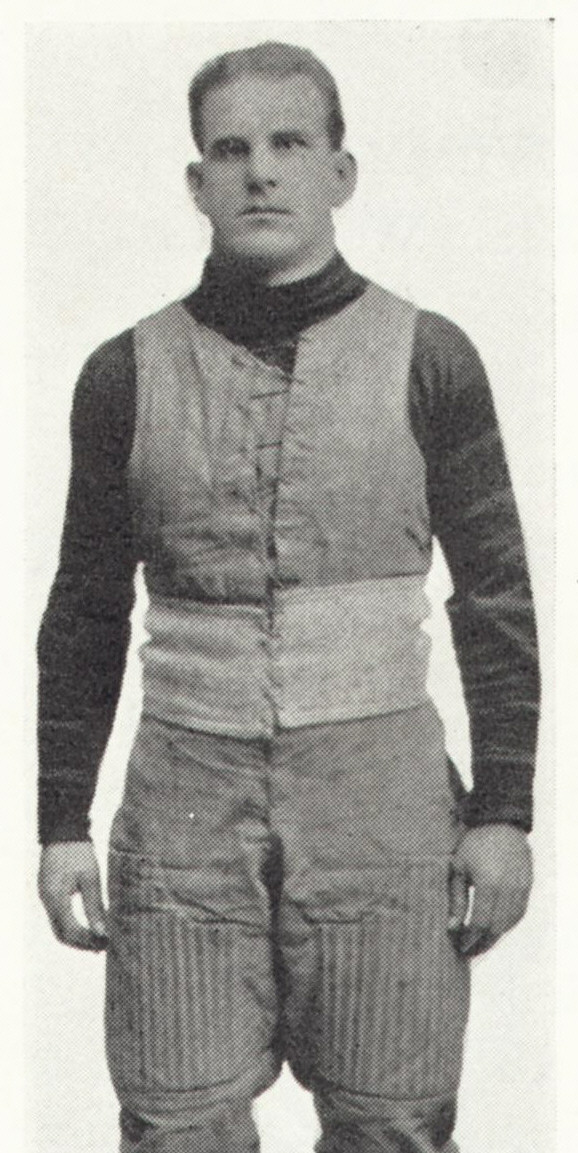

Biographical details
- Born: February 22, 1878; Nashville, Tennessee, U.S.
- Died: June 14, 1949 (aged 71); Horse Cave, Kentucky, U.S.

Playing career

Football
- 1897: Tennessee
- 1898–1899: Bethel (TN)

Baseball
- 1903, 1908: St. Louis Cardinals
- Position: Running back

Coaching career (HC unless noted)

Football
- 1898: Bethel (TN)
- 1900–1901: Nashville
- 1902–1903: Dallas A. C.
- 1909–1914: Texas A&M
- 1915: Carlisle (trainer)
- 1917–1923: Centre
- 1924–1926: Bucknell
- 1927: Frankford Yellow Jackets
- 1930–1933: Catawba

Baseball
- 1909–1914: Texas A&M

Head coaching record
- Overall: 138–35–13 (college football); 2–5–1 (NFL); 48–46–5 (college baseball)
- Bowls: 1–2

Accomplishments and honors

Championships
- Football; 1 SIAA (1921); 2 North State (1930, 1932)

Charles Barthell Moran (February 22, 1878 – June 14, 1949), nicknamed "Uncle Charley", was an American sportsman who gained renown as both a catcher and umpire in Major League Baseball and as a collegiate and professional American football coach.

== Early life ==
Moran was born in Nashville, Tennessee to an Irish Protestant family. He played football for the University of Tennessee in 1897, but left after one year to go to Bethel College, where he coached football as well as playing the sport.

Moran coached the University of Nashville football team in 1900 and 1901. The 1901 team was one of the South's greatest.

== Baseball ==
Moran played minor league baseball in 1902 for teams in Little Rock, Chattanooga and Dallas.

In 1903, Moran pitched for the National League's St. Louis Cardinals, who finished in last place, but he appeared in only three games (plus another as a shortstop) before injuring his arm. He posted a 5.25 earned run average in his brief tenure of 24 innings, being charged with a loss without earning a win, but also batted .429. He went back to the minor leagues to manage the Dallas Giants in 1904, and continued playing with teams in Galveston (1905), Waco and Cleburne (1906), Grand Rapids (1906–07) and Savannah (1908). The 1906 Cleburne team won the Texas League championship. He returned to the Cardinals as a catcher in 1908 and played in 21 games, batting .175 as the team again finished last.

His minor league career continued with teams in Milwaukee, Mobile, New Orleans, Dallas and Montgomery until he suffered a broken leg in 1912. He briefly played with teams in Chattanooga and Brunswick in 1913 before retiring as a player. After managing an Austin team in 1914, he began umpiring, in the Texas League in 1915–16 and the Southern Association in 1917.

== Coaching and officiating ==
=== Texas A&M ===
Moran began coaching football in 1909 at Texas A&M, where he accumulated a 38–8–4 record as head coach over six seasons through 1914.

=== Carlisle ===
He then became the trainer for Head Coach Victor "Choctaw" Kelley at the Carlisle Indian Industrial School in 1915.

=== National League umpire ===
He became a National League umpire in 1918, a job he held through the 1939 season. He officiated in four World Series (1927, 1929, 1933, and 1938), serving as crew chief on the last two occasions. He was behind the plate on May 8, 1929, when Carl Hubbell of the New York Giants pitched an 11–0 no-hitter against the Pittsburgh Pirates.

=== Centre ===
Moran also resumed his career as a football head coach in 1917 at Centre College, where he had a 42–6–1 record in five seasons. He had previously been working as an assistant coach at Carlisle, and had visited Centre to see his son Tom—later an NFL player with the New York Giants—play; after helping the team prepare for an important contest he was offered the head coaching job by the school. The first two games of the 1917 season were coached by Robert L. "Chief" Myers, and the rest by Moran. According to Centre publications, "Myers realized he was dealing with a group of exceptional athletes, who were far beyond his ability to coach. He needed someone who could do the team justice, and found that person in Charles Moran." His record included undefeated seasons in 1919 and 1921, when the team was led on the field by Hall of Fame quarterback Bo McMillin. On October 29, 1921, Moran guided Centre College to a historic 6–0 upset of Harvard, which had been unbeaten the previous two seasons. The game, commonly abbreviated "C6-H0", was ranked the 3rd biggest upset in college football history by ESPN.

During the 1921 season Moran began a friendship with future baseball commissioner Happy Chandler, who was then a player on an opposing Transylvania University team.

=== Bucknell ===
Moran then moved to Bucknell University, where he had a 19–10–2 record from 1924 through 1926.

=== Frankford Yellow Jackets ===
He was co-coach with Ed Weir of the NFL's Frankford Yellow Jackets in 1927, but left after the team managed only a 6–9–3 season.

=== Catawba ===
His final coaching job was at Catawba College from 1930 through 1933, where he had a 22–11–5 record.

== Death and legacy ==
Moran died of heart disease at age 71 in Horse Cave, Kentucky, and was buried at Horse Cave Cemetery. He was named to the Texas A&M Athletic Hall of Fame in 1968.

== Head coaching record ==
=== College football ===
| Year | Team | Overall | Conference | Standing | Bowl/playoffs |
|---|---|---|---|---|---|
Bethel Corporals (Independent) (1898)
| 1898 | Bethel | ? | | | |
Nashville Garnet and Blue (Southern Intercollegiate Athletic Association) (1900–1901)
| 1900 | Nashville | 1–3 | 1–3 | | |
| 1901 | Nashville | 6–1–1 | 3–1–1 | 3rd | |
| Nashville: | | 7–4–1 | 4–4–1 | | |
Texas A&M Aggies (Independent) (1909–1911)
| 1909 | Texas A&M | 7–0–1 | | | |
| 1910 | Texas A&M | 8–1 | | | |
| 1911 | Texas A&M | 6–1 | | | |
Texas A&M Aggies (Southern Intercollegiate Athletic Association) (1912–1914)
| 1912 | Texas A&M | 8–1 | 2–0 | 2nd | |
| 1913 | Texas A&M | 3–4–2 | 0–1–1 | 13th | |
| 1914 | Texas A&M | 6–1–1 | 2–0 | 3rd | |
| Texas A&M: | | 38–8–4 | 4–1–1 | | |
Centre (Independent) (1917)
| 1917 | Centre | 6–0 | | | |
Centre Colonels (Independent) (1918)
| 1918 | Centre | 4–0 | | | |
Centre Praying Colonels (Southern Intercollegiate Athletic Association) (1919–1923)
| 1919 | Centre | 9–0 | 3–0 | T–1st | |
| 1920 | Centre | 8–2 | 4–1 | T–5th | W Fort Worth Classic |
| 1921 | Centre | 10–1 | 5–0 | T–1st | W San Diego East-West Christmas Classic, L Dixie Classic |
| 1922 | Centre | 8–2 | 1–0 | T–5th | |
| 1923 | Centre | 7–1–1 | 2–0 | T–2nd | |
| Centre: | | 52–6–1 | 15–1 | | |
Bucknell Bison (Independent) (1924–1926)
| 1924 | Bucknell | 8–2 | | | |
| 1925 | Bucknell | 7–3–1 | | | |
| 1926 | Bucknell | 4–5–1 | | | |
| Bucknell: | | 19–10–2 | | | |
Catawba Indians (North State Conference) (1930–1933)
| 1930 | Catawba | 8–0–1 | 5–0 | 1st | |
| 1931 | Catawba | 7–3–1 | 2–1 | T–2nd | |
| 1932 | Catawba | 6–2–1 | 4–0 | 1st | |
| 1933 | Catawba | 2–5–2 | 1–1–1 | T–4th | |
| Catawba: | | 23–10–5 | 12–2–1 | | |
| Total: | | 138–35–13 | | | |
National championship Conference title Conference division title or championship game berth
