= 1921 College Football All-Southern Team =

American all-star college football team

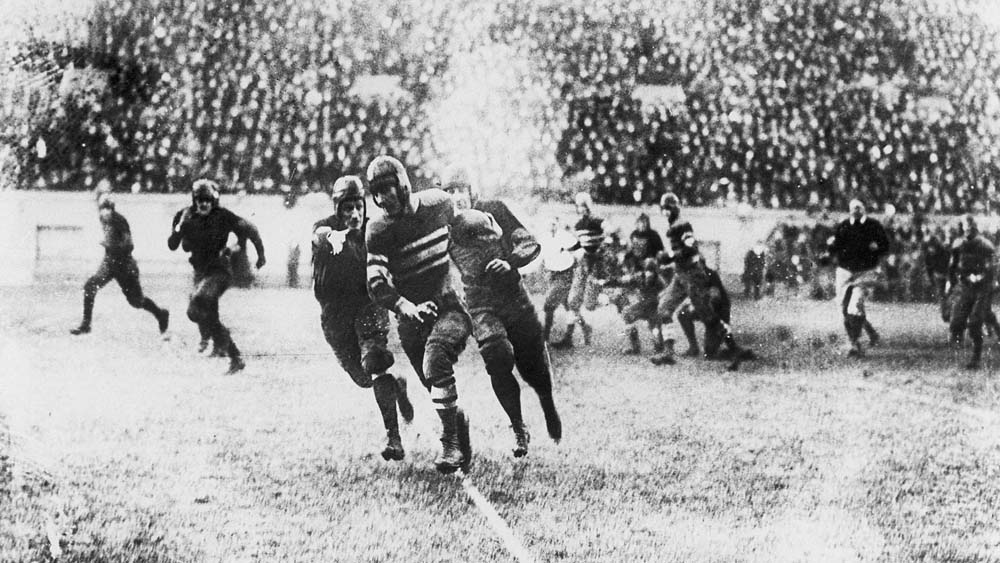
Bo McMillin of Centre running on Harvard.

The 1921 College Football All-Southern Team consists of American football players selected to the College Football All-Southern Teams selected by various organizations for the 1921 Southern Intercollegiate Athletic Association football season. This was the last year before many schools left the Southern Intercollegiate Athletic Association (SIAA) for the Southern Conference (SoCon).

Centre posted the SIAA's best record and upset Harvard 6–0. Georgia Tech was also undefeated in conference play, as were Georgia and Vanderbilt, the latter two posting one tie against the other. Vanderbilt was the only one to remain undefeated overall, and were selected as a national champion retroactively by selector Clyde Berryman.

== Composite eleven ==
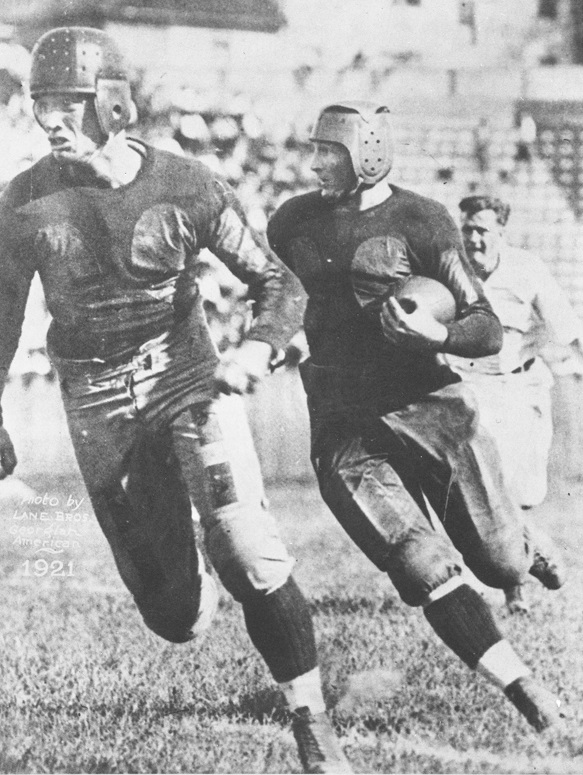
Judy Harlan of Georgia Tech blocking for Red Barron.

The composite All-Southern eleven awarded gold badges and formed by 30 sports writers culled by the Atlanta Constitution and Atlanta Journal included:

- Red Barron, halfback for Georgia Tech, also an All-Southern baseball player who played pro ball with the Boston Braves. He later coached high school football. Sam Murray, who played later for Georgia Tech as a substitute fullback, was asked about a certain strong runner in the 1930s, "He's good. But if I were playing again, I would have one wish – never to see bearing down upon me a more fearsome picture of power than Judy Harlan blocking for Red Barron."
- Noah Caton, center for Auburn, died just a year later due to complications from an appendicitis operation.
- Bum Day, center for Georgia. Not a single point was scored all year through Georgia's line, and over two years (1920 and 1921) Georgia did not lose to a single southern opponent. In 1918, as a player for Georgia Tech, Day was the first Southern player selected first-team All-American by Walter Camp.
- Goat Hale, quarterback for Mississippi College, inducted into the College Football Hall of Fame in 1963. Got the nickname "Goat" in high school when he battered through the line, scoring a touchdown, and ran past the end zone until his head hit a wooden building, loosening several planks.
- Judy Harlan, fullback for Georgia Tech, a senior captain and third-team All-American.
- Bo McMillin, quarterback for Centre College, unanimous selection, inaugural inductee into the College Football Hall of Fame in 1951. He led Centre over defending national champion Harvard 6–0 in what is widely considered one of the greatest upsets in college football history. In 1919, he was the second southern player selected first-team All-American by Walter Camp.
- Owen Reynolds, end for Georgia, played for the New York Giants in their inaugural season of 1925.
- Artie Pew, tackle for Georgia. He was also the team's kicker as well as a basketball player.
- Red Roberts, end for Centre, this year the fifth southern player selected first-team All-American by Walter Camp. Roberts was a unanimous selection for the Associated Press Southeast Area All-Time football team 1869–1919 era. Later coached the Waynesburg Yellow Jackets.
- Albert Staton, tackle for Georgia Tech, the starting end on the all-time Heisman era team.
- Puss Whelchel, guard for Georgia, captain-elect and third-team All-American.

== Composite overview ==
Bo McMillin was the only unanimous choice for the composite selection. Caton and Staton were picked out of the ties due to having the most votes at multiple positions.

Name	Position	School	First-team selections
Bo McMillin	Quarterback	Centre	30
Red Barron	Halfback	Georgia Tech	28
Owen Reynolds	End	Georgia	26
Red Roberts	End	Centre	26
Puss Whelchel	Guard	Georgia	25
Bum Day	Center	Georgia	21
Judy Harlan	Fullback	Georgia Tech	21
Goat Hale	Halfback	Mississippi College	20
Artie Pew	Tackle	Georgia	19
Noah Caton	Guard	Auburn	9
Oscar Davis	Guard	Georgia Tech	9
Albert Staton	Tackle	Georgia Tech	6
Joe Bennett	Tackle	Georgia	6
Fletcher Skidmore	Tackle	Sewanee	6
Tootie Perry	Guard	Florida	1

== All-Southerns of 1921 ==
=== Ends ===
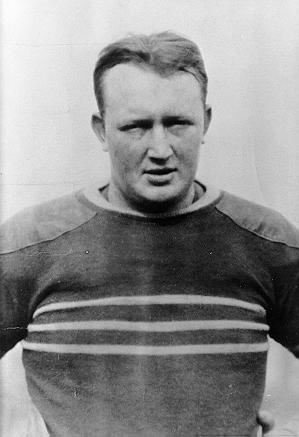
Red Roberts of Centre.

- Owen Reynolds, Georgia (C, D, BD, JLR, MM, BCL, CEB, SM, MB, ED, GAB, MCK, EH, S, KS, CM, JS, FW, DH, TU)
- Red Roberts, Centre (C, D, BD [as t], JLR, MM, BCL, CEB, SM, MB, ED, GAB, MCK. EH, ER, BB, S, KS [as t], CM [as t], JS, DH, TU)
- Lynn Bomar, Vanderbilt (College Football Hall of Fame) (JLR [as t], MM [as t], SM [as t])
- Bill James, Centre (BD, CM)
- John Staton, Georgia Tech (BB)
- Graham Vowell, Tennessee (KS)
- Rodney Ollinger, Auburn (FW, DH [as hb])
- Tom Ryan, Vanderbilt

=== Tackles ===
- Artie Pew, Georgia (C, BCL, CEB, MB, ED, GAB, MCK, S, JS, FW, DH)
- Al Staton, Georgia Tech (C, D, SM, MB, ED, ER [as e])
- Fletcher Skidmore, Sewanee (C, JLR [as g], MM, SM, MCK, EH, ER, BB, TU)
- Joe Bennett, Georgia (C, D, S, KS, DH)
- Ben Cregor, Centre (BD, SM [as g], CM)
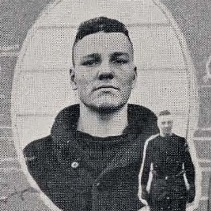
  Noah Caton of Auburn.
- Pink Wade, Vanderbilt (CEB, EH, ER, BB)
- Pos Elam, Vanderbilt (GAB)
- Tot McCullough, Vanderbilt (FW)
- Summers, VMI (VMI)

=== Guards ===
- Puss Whelchel, Georgia (C, JLR, BCL, CEB, MB, ED, GAB, S, KS, JS, FW, TU)
- Noah Caton, Auburn (C, D [as c], BD, BCL [as t], MM, CEB, ED, MCK, EH, ER, BB, CM, JS [as t])
- Oscar Davis, Georgia Tech (C, D, BCL, MB, S, KS, TU)
- Tootie Perry, Florida (C, JLR [as t], GAB, JS)
- Charles Lindsay, Tennessee (MCK, ER, BB)
- Noisy Grisham, Auburn (FW)
- Thurston Anthony, Georgia (DH)
- George M. Chinn, Centre (DH)

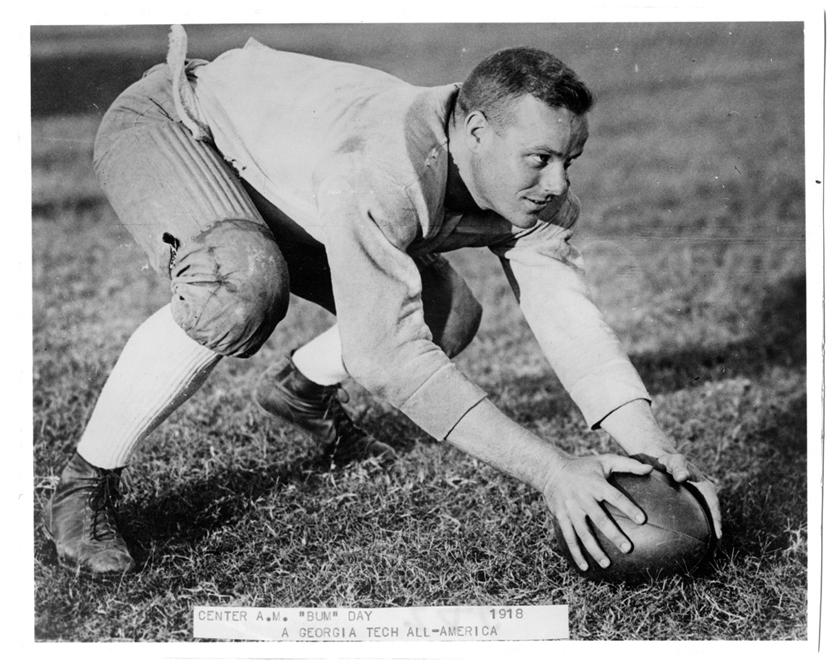
Bum Day while playing for Georgia Tech.

=== Centers ===
- Bum Day, Georgia (C, D [as g], BD [as g], JLR, MM [as g], BCL, CEB, SM, MB, ED, GAB, MCK, EH [as g], ER, BB, CM [as g], JS, FW, DH, TU)
- Ed Kubale, Centre (BD, CM)
- Alf Sharpe, Vanderbilt (MM)
- Eddie Reed, Tulane (EH)
- Kenneth Grizzard, Tennessee (S, KS)

=== Quarterbacks ===
- Bo McMillin*†, Centre (College Football Hall of Fame) (C, D, BD, JLR, MM, BCL, CEB, SM, MB, ED, GAB, MCK, EH, ER, BB, S, KS, CM, JS, FW, DH, TU)

=== Halfbacks ===
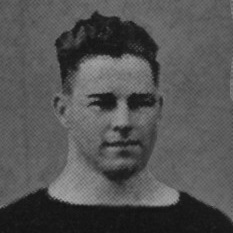
Goat Hale of Mississippi College.

- Red Barron, Georgia Tech (C, D, BD, JLR, MM, BCL, CEB, SM, MB, ED, GAB, EH, ER, BB, S, KS, CM, JS, FW, DH)
- Goat Hale, Mississippi College (College Football Hall of Fame) (C, BD, JLR, MM, BCL, CEB, SM [as fb], MCK, EH, BB, KS, FW, TU)
- Herb Covington, Centre (SM, MCK, S [as fb])
- Jim Tom Reynolds, Georgia (ER, JS)
- Dode Phillips, Erskine (S, TU)
- Milton McManaway, Furman (ED)
- Terry Snoddy, Centre (CM)

=== Fullbacks ===
- Judy Harlan, fullback, Georgia Tech (C, D, BD, JLR, MM, BCL, CEB, MB, ED, GAB, BB, CM, FW, TU)
- Ed Sherling, Auburn (D [as hb], MB [as hb], MCK, EH, ER, JS, DH)
- Roe Campbell, Tennessee (GAB [as hb], KS)

== Key ==
Bold = Composite selection

* = Consensus All-American

† = Unanimous selection

C = Received votes for a composite All-SIAA eleven selected by 30 sports writers and culled by the Atlanta Constitution and Atlanta Journal. Each of the composite eleven selected were presented with gold football badges.

D = selected by Mike Donahue, coach at Auburn University.

BD = selected by Bruce Dudley, sporting editor of the Louisville Herald.

JLR = selected by J. L. Ray of the Nashville Banner.

MM = selected by Marvin McCarthy of the Birmingham Age-Herald.

BCL = selected by B. C. Lumpkin of the Athens Daily News.

CEB = selected by C. E. Baker of the Macon Telegraph.

SM = selected by Sam H. McMeekin of the Courier-Journal.

MB = selected by Morgan Blake of the Atlanta Journal.

ED = selected by Ed Danforth of the Atlanta Georgian.

GAB = selected by George A. Butler of the Chattanooga News.

MCK = selected by William McG. Keefe of the Times-Picayune.

EH = selected by Ed Hebert of the Times-Picayune.

ER = selected by Eddie Reed, captain of the Tulane eleven.

BB = selected by Bill Brennan, associate coach at Tulane.

S = selected by coach Herman Stegeman of the University of Georgia.

KS = selected by the Knoxville Sentinel

CM = selected by coach Charley Moran of Centre College.

JS = selected by John Snell of the Enquirer-Sun.

FW = selected by Fuzzy Woodruff.

DH = selected by Dunbar Hair of the Augusta Chronicle.

TU = selected by the Times-Union.

== See also ==
- 1921 College Football All-America Team
