= Andy Frye Stadium =

Multi-purpose stadium in Danville, Kentucky, United States

- Interactive map of Andy Frye Stadium
- Address: Danville, KY; United States
- Coordinates: 37.642755°N 84.779751°W
- Owner: Centre College
- Operator: Centre College Athletics
- Type: Stadium
- Surface: Artificial turf
- Current use: Football; Lacrosse; Track and field

Construction
- Opened: 2022; 4 years ago

Tenants
- Centre Colonels (NCAA) teams: football, lacrosse, track and field (2022–present)

Website
- centrecolonels.com/andy-frye-stadium

Joe McDaniel Field at Andy Frye Stadium is a stadium in Danville, Kentucky, located on the campus of Centre College. It is the home of the Centre Colonels football, lacrosse, and track teams.

It was constructed on the grounds of Farris Stadium, which was demolished in 2022. The playing surface is named for Joe McDaniel, who was Centre's head football coach from 1980 to 1997, and the stadium is named for Andy Frye, who has coached the team since 1998.
