= Milton McManaway =

American football player (1901–1946)

Profile
- Position: Quarterback

Personal information
- Born: November 15, 1901; Greenville County, South Carolina, U.S.
- Died: 1946; Chicago, Illinois, U.S.

Career information
- College: Furman (1919–1921)

Awards and highlights
- All-Southern (1921); Furman Athletic Hall of Fame

Milton Edward McManaway (November 15, 1901 – 1946) was an American college football player. He later coached high school football before becoming a successful attorney in Chicago. He also spent time as an insurance agent in Spartanburg, South Carolina.

== Early life ==
McManaway was born on November 15, 1901, in Greenville County, South Carolina, to Reverend John E. and Carrie T. (Freeman) McManaway. He attended public school in Greenville, South Carolina.

== Furman ==
McManaway was a prominent quarterback for Billy Laval's Furman Purple Hurricane of Furman University in Greenville, South Carolina. He was also a star on defense and was noted for his ability to intercept and break up forward passes. He also never had a punt blocked. He was inducted into the Furman Athletic Hall of Fame in 1986.

=== 1920 ===
McManaway was quarterback and Speedy Speer halfback on the 1920 team which suffered its only loss to SIAA champion Georgia. McManaway was elected captain at year's end.

=== 1921 ===
Furman did not lose to an opponent from South Carolina for 3 years from 1919 to 1921, outscoring opponents 485 to 32. "In Captain McManaway, quarter-back, Furman had a man who could run, punt and pass from punt formation as good as the best." He was selected All-Southern by Ed Danforth of the Atlanta Georgian. McManaway was called by Scoop Latimer "one of two best quarterbacks in the South," presumably behind Centre's Bo McMillin.

== High school coaching ==
McManaway's first high school coaching position after Furman was at Batesburg-Leesville (SC) High School. In 1922 he led the Twins to a 6–3–1 record as they fell to Charleston High School in the Lower State Championship, 40–0. Charleston would win the championship over Gaffney.

In 1923 the Twins again went 6–3–1 as they fell to Columbia High School in the Lower State Championship, 14–0. Columbia lost to Thornwell in the championship game. Through 1925 there was only a single classification in South Carolina High School football with Batesburg-Leesville being a much smaller school than Charleston and Columbia, two of the largest cities in the state. Following the 1923–24 school year McManaway left Batesburg-Leesville with a record of 12–6–2.

== Legal career and death ==
McManaway earned law degrees at Northwestern University Pritzker School of Law and the University of Chicago Law School. He worked in the legal department of Montgomery Ward and the Reconstruction Finance Corporation. McManaway died in early 1946 following a sudden illness, at his home in Chicago.
