= Bill James (American football) =

American football player and coach (1897–1969)

Biographical details
- Born: November 14, 1897; Watauga, Texas, U.S.
- Died: September 15, 1969 (aged 71); Kerrville, Texas, U.S.

Playing career
- 1918–1921: Centre
- Positions: Tackle, end

Coaching career (HC unless noted)
- 1924: TCU (line)
- 1925–1935: Texas (line)
- 1936–1947: Texas A&M (line)
- 1949–1951: Trinity (TX)

Head coaching record
- Overall: 15–14–3

Accomplishments and honors

Awards
- All-Southern (1919, 1920, 1921)

William Nelson James (November 14, 1897 – September 15, 1969) was an American college football player and coach. He served as the head football coach at Trinity University in San Antonio from 1949 to 1951, compiling a record of 15–14–3.

== Early life and college playing career ==
James was born on November 14, 1897, in Watauga, Texas. After graduating from North Side High School in Fort Worth, Texas, he went to Centre College with former coach Robert L. Myers joining up with the likes of high school teammates Matty Bell, Bob Mathias, and Sully Montgomery. Bo McMillin and Red Weaver played for North Side as well, but did not have enough credits to yet go to college. They went to Somerset High in Kentucky, where they met up with Red Roberts and were recruited by boosters to Centre. The 1917 team ostensibly did so well that Myers felt his players were better than his coaching abilities, and hired Charley Moran. James was thrice an All-Southern tackle and end. He started at end in the 1921 Centre vs. Harvard football game.

== Coaching career ==
James was an assistant for the Texas A&M Aggies.

James was the head football coach at Trinity College in San Antonio from 1949 to 1951.

== Late life and death ==
James retired from coaching in 1952. He continued as owner of Camp Stewart, a boys' summer camp in Hunt, Texas, which he had owned since 1929. James died on September 15, 1969, at Sid Peterson Memorial Hospital in Kerrville, Texas, following an illness.

== Head coaching record ==
=== College ===
| Year | Team | Overall | Conference | Standing | Bowl/playoffs |
|---|---|---|---|---|---|
Trinity Tigers (Gulf Coast Conference) (1949–1951)
| 1949 | Trinity | 6–5–1 | 0–3 | 4th | |
| 1950 | Trinity | 5–4–1 | 0–2 | 3rd | |
| 1951 | Trinity | 4–5–1 | 0–1–1 | T–2nd | |
| Trinity: | | 15–14–3 | 0–6–1 | | |
| Total: | | 15–14–3 | | | |
