= Robert L. Myers (coach) =

American football coach and athletic director (1887–1953)

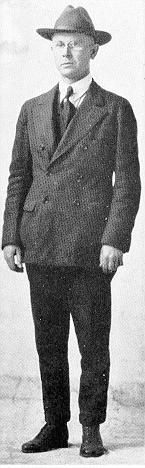

Biographical details
- Born: September 1, 1887; Atchison, Kansas, U.S.
- Died: May 5, 1953 (aged 65); Algonquin, Illinois, U.S.

Playing career
- 1907: Centre

Coaching career (HC unless noted)
- 1916: North Side HS (TX)
- 1917: Centre
- 1918: Centre (assistant)
- 1924–1925: Centre

Administrative career (AD unless noted)
- 1917–1925: Centre

Head coaching record
- Overall: 9–8–1 (college)

Accomplishments and honors

Championships
- 1 SIAA (1924)

Robert Lee "Chief" Myers (September 1, 1887 – May 5, 1953) was an American football coach and athletic director foundational in the success of the Centre Praying Colonels football programs of Centre College in the period from 1917 to 1925. This era included the 1921 Centre vs. Harvard football game, one of the sport's greatest upsets.

== Early years ==
Myers was born in Atchison, Kansas. He graduated from Centre College, class of 1907. He then found himself in Chicago watching clinics performed by Amos Alonzo Stagg.

== Coaching career ==
=== High school ===
Myers coached at North Side High School in Fort Worth, Texas c. 1916. He had implemented a system of play akin to Pop Warner's. His team there included future Centre stars Bo McMillin and Red Weaver, who, after needing more credits, were recruited by boosters to Somerset High School in Kentucky, where they joined up with Kentucky native Red Roberts. Also at North Side were Sully Montgomery, Matty Bell, Bill James, and Bob Mathias. Myers brought all of these to his alma mater Centre College in Danville, Kentucky.

=== Centre ===
As one writer explains, Centre's success in football from 1917 to 1924 "came about because one man dreamed it, and put his feet to the ground with a plan, and then realized his dream to make Centre the No. 1 football team in America. That person was Robert Livingston "Chief" Myers, who had been a 98-pound weakling when he played football. He was a scrub and they made him the water boy. But he had a love for football, a passion for football, so even though he didn't make varsity, that didn't stop him from wanting to coach Centre, and didn't stop him from trying to put together the best team possible."

==== 1917 ====
The first two games were coached by Myers, and the rest by Charley Moran. According to Centre publications, "Myers realized he was dealing with a group of exceptional athletes, who were far beyond his ability to coach. He needed someone who could [do] the team justice, and found that person in Charles Moran."

==== 1921 ====
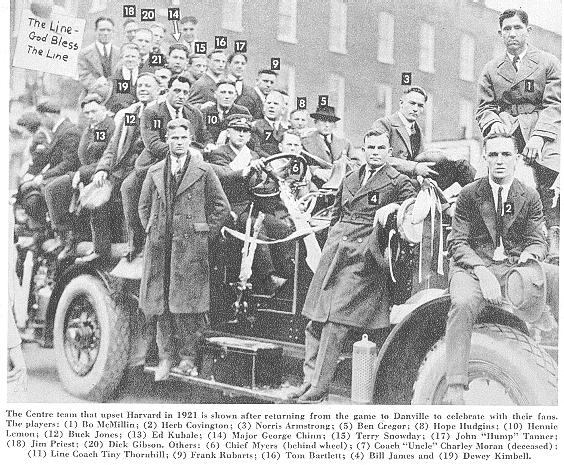
Centre returning from its defeat of Harvard. Myers is in the center, his face partly obstructed by the wheel.

Myers was then athletic director of Centre from 1920 to 1922. Centre's undefeated season in 1919 drew attention and a challenge from Harvard. Centre lost to Harvard in 1920, but in 1921 it defeated the Crimson 6 to 0 in what is widely considered one of the greatest upsets in college football history. McMillin got the score with Roberts providing the blocking. Following the game, students from MIT who came to cheer against Harvard carried McMillin off the field and tore down the goalposts.

==== 1924 ====
Myers led the Colonels to their last Southern championship in 1924. The team defeated both Georgia and SoCon champion Alabama.

== Later years and death ==
Myers left Centre in 1925 and worked with his father in the White & Myers Chautauqua and subsequently with Interstate Lyceum Bureau of Chicago. In 1932, he was hired as director of admissions and publicity at the Kentucky Military Institute in Lyndon, Kentucky. Myers returned in 1944 to Centre, serving as director of publicity until 1950 when he took the same position at Trinity University in San Antonio. He left Trinity in 1953 and moved to Algonquin, Illinois to live with his son. Myers died on May 5, 1953, in Algonquin.

== Head coaching record ==
Year	Team	Overall	Conference	Standing	Bowl/playoffs
Centre (Independent) (1917)
1917	Centre	1–1			
Centre Praying Colonels (Southern Intercollegiate Athletic Association) (1924)
1924	Centre	5–1–1	1–0	T–1st	
1925	Centre	3–6	1–1	11th	
Centre:		9–8–1	2–1		
Total:		9–8–1			
National championship Conference title Conference division title or championship game berth
