= Red Roberts (American football) =

American football player and coach (1900–1945)

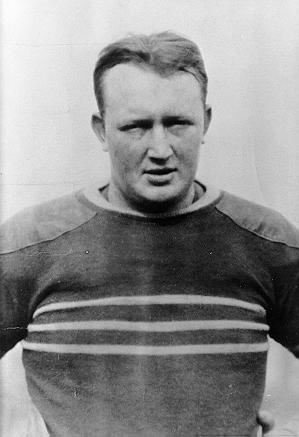
- Roberts, suited up for Centre College

Biographical details
- Born: August 23, 1900; Somerset, Kentucky, U.S.
- Died: June 27, 1945 (aged 44); Middlesboro, Kentucky, U.S.

Playing career
- 1919–1922: Centre
- 1922: Toledo Maroons
- 1922: Akron Pros
- 1926: Cleveland Panthers
- Positions: Fullback, end, guard, tackle

Coaching career (HC unless noted)
- 1923: Waynesburg

Head coaching record
- Overall: 3–4–1

Accomplishments and honors

Awards
- 2× First-team All-American (1921, 1922); Third-team All-American (1919); 3× All-Southern (1919, 1921, 1922); All-time Centre team; Associated Press Southeast Area All-Time football team 1869-1919 era

This is an article about the college football coach. For the baseball player, see Red Roberts.

James Madison "Red" Roberts (August 23, 1900 – June 27, 1945) was an American football player and coach. He played football for the Centre Praying Colonels in Danville, Kentucky. Roberts was thrice selected All-Southern, and a unanimous choice for the Associated Press Southeast Area All-Time football team 1869-1919 era. After college Roberts, played in the early National Football League (NFL) for the Toledo Maroons and the Akron Pros. He also played in the first American Football League for the Cleveland Panthers. Roberts served as the head football coach at Waynesburg College—now known as Waynesburg University—in Waynesburg, Pennsylvania, for one season, in 1923. He later made a run for the office of Governor of Kentucky as a Democrat in 1931, losing in the primary to Ruby Laffoon who went on to win the election.

== Playing career ==
Roberts entered Centre in 1918, and was the most prominent Kentucky native on the 9–0 1919 team and the 1921 team which upset Harvard. Roberts once saved Roscoe Brumfield, the Centre College mascot, after someone pushed him into the lake and he could not swim and went down the second time.

Roberts played fullback and end for the Centre Colonels football team along with such teammates as Norris Armstrong, Bo McMillin, Red Weaver, Sully Montgomery, and Matty Bell. Roberts was chosen as end on Centre's all-time football team chosen in 1935. He was 6'2" and 235 pounds.

Texans McMillin and Weaver happened to meet up with Roberts at Somerset High, and came to Centre due to boosters, meeting up with a slew of former Texas hands in coach Robert L. Myers and players Matty Bell, Sully Montgomery, Bill James, and Bob Mathias. The team posted a 7–1 record in 1917, ostensibly so good that Myers needed a better coach and hired Charley Moran.

=== 1921 ===
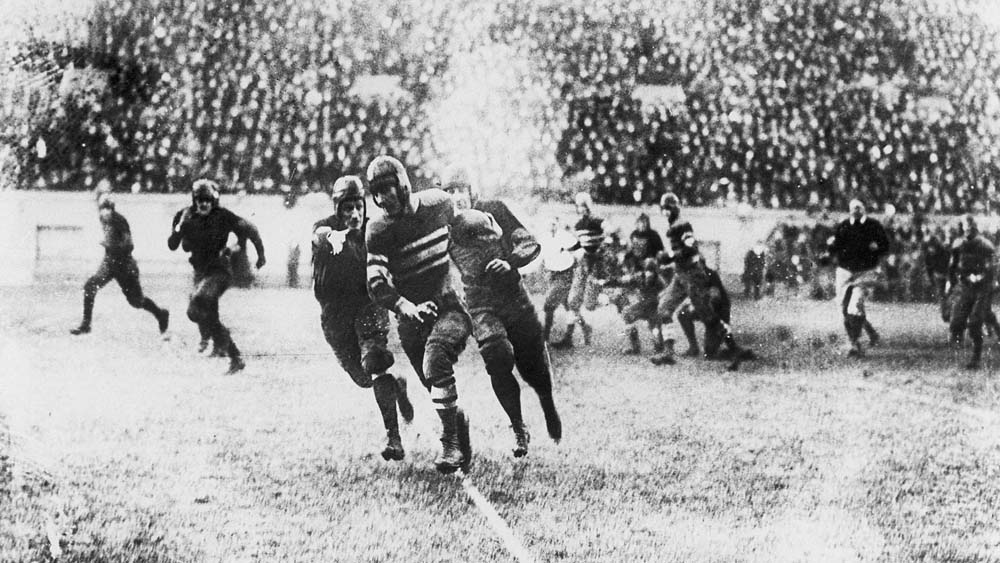
"It's time to score, ride my hump." Bo McMillin's touchdown run at Harvard.

McMillin scored the one 32-yard touchdown of the Harvard game, but the interference was furnished by Roberts. After a scoreless half and early in the third quarter, Roberts told McMillin "it's time to score, ride my hump", and McMillin rushed for the lone touchdown of the game." He also scored the first touchdown in the 35 to 14 loss to Harvard the previous year. Roberts was selected by Walter Camp as a first team All-American at the end of the regular season and became the fifth first-team player designated by Camp, joining teammates "Bo" McMillin and Red Weaver, who were picked in prior years. Roberts received Camp's honorable mention in 1922.

Roberts gave his blood to save his sister.

== Coaching career ==
Roberts was the head football coach at Waynesburg College—now known as Waynesburg University—in Waynesburg, Pennsylvania, for the 1923 season. His coaching record at Waynesburg was 3–4–1.

== Death ==
Roberts died on June 27, 1945, from burns suffered when a fire broke out on the third floor of the Cumberland Hotel in Middlesboro, Kentucky, where he was the manager. Mrs. Anny Teapa Roberts, a native of Vienna, Austria, whom he married the previous April, also badly burned, said she had fallen asleep in the bedroom while her husband was talking with a guest in the living room of their suite. Roberts apparently fell asleep on the living room couch after his guest had left, she said, and neither she nor Roberts awakened until fire flashed out in the living room. Roberts' wife said the flash seemed to come from an electrical fixture in the room. She said she ran into the room to bring Roberts out but he was badly burned by the time she reached him.

== Head coaching record ==
Year	Team	Overall	Conference	Standing	Bowl/playoffs
Waynesburg Yellow Jackets (Independent) (1923)
1923	Waynesburg	3–4–1			
Waynesburg:		3–4–1			
Total:		3–4–1			
