= Fletcher Skidmore =

American football player (1898–1965)

Sewanee Tigers
- Position: Tackle/Kicker

Personal information
- Born: May 12, 1898; Decatur, Alabama
- Died: September 10, 1965 (aged 67); Hurricane, Utah

Career information
- College: Sewanee (1917, 1919–1921)

Awards and highlights
- All-Southern (1921)

Fletcher Lee Skidmore (May 12, 1898 – September 10, 1965) was a college football player.

== Early life ==
Skidmore was born May 12, 1898, in Decatur, Alabama, to James Sells and Bertha Weeber Skidmore.

== Sewanee ==
Skidmore was a prominent tackle for the Sewanee Tigers football team of Sewanee: The University of the South. He was also a member of the track team. At one time he held the record for the 16 pound shot put. Skidmore also competed for the Sewanee Tigers track and field team as a hammer thrower. While at Sewanee and for some years after, he lived in Winchester, Tennessee.

=== 1921 ===
In the 17–0 victory over Alabama, Skidmore gave the Tigers an early 3–0 lead with his 40-yard field goal in the first quarter. He was selected All-Southern.
