= Teel Bruner =

American football player (born 1964)

Jack Casteel "Teel" Bruner
Profile
- Position: Safety

Personal information
- Born: February 16, 1964 (age 62); London, Kentucky

Career information
- College: Centre
- College Football Hall of Fame

Jack Casteel "Teel" Bruner (born February 16, 1964) is an American former football safety. He was elected to the College Football Hall of Fame in 1999. He currently works at St. Mary's Hospital and Clinics in Cottonwood, Idaho as a family practice physician. He is a former head coach for Prairie High School's varsity basketball team and former defensive coordinator for Prairie High's football team. Coach Bruner has won 2 state titles in the 1A div 1 classification during his basketball coaching tenure.

Bruner's defensive abilities helped lead Prairie to a 4–2 record in the Idaho 1A State Championship Game. In the 2014–15 seasons, Bruner alongside Head Coach Ryan Hasselstrom and assistant coaches Ron Sigler and Matt Elven led the Prairie Pirates football team to 23 straight wins, tying a school record previously set in 2008–09. (Both times their streak ended in the State Championship game). Most recently, he was part of the 2019 State Championship team at Prairie High School. He stepped down at the end of the 2019 season.
