= Rodney Ollinger =

American football player

Auburn Tigers
- Position: End

Personal information
- Born: Mobile, Alabama

Career information
- College: Auburn (1918–1921)

Awards and highlights
- All-Southern (1919, 1921)

Rodney Ollinger was a college football player for the Auburn Tigers football team. He played first for Spring Hill, where he was a renowned punter. Ollinger was an end for coach Mike Donahue's team, a member of the Southern Intercollegiate Athletic Association (SIAA) champion 1919 team, a season in which he was All-Southern. He was a standout as a punter and on defense in the win over the Mississippi Aggies.
