= T. L. Anthony =

American football player and coach (1896–1958)

Biographical details
- Born: April 11, 1896; Madison County, Georgia, U.S.
- Died: February 27, 1958 (aged 61); Wilson County, North Carolina, U.S.

Playing career
- 1919–1923: Georgia
- Position: Guard

Coaching career (HC unless noted)
- ?: Statesboro Agricultural School
- ?: Powder Springs A&M College
- 1926–1927: Sale City HS (GA)
- 1928–1930: Atlantic Christian

Head coaching record
- Overall: 4–18–1 (college)

Thurston Lafayette "Mark" Anthony (April 11, 1896 – February 27, 1958) was an American football coach and player. He played college football as a lineman for the Georgia Bulldogs and was named to the 1921 College Football All-Southern Team. After graduating from Georgia, he held football and basketball coaching positions with several schools, including Statesboro Agricultural School, Powder Springs A&M College, and Atlantic Christian College (later renamed Barton College).

== Early years ==
Anthony was born in 1896 and raised in High Shoals, Georgia.

== University of Georgia ==
Anthony attended the University of Georgia, where was a star athlete in football, basketball and track. He played at the guard position for both the undefeated 1920 Georgia Bulldogs football team that has been recognized as a national champion and the 1921 team that won the 1921 Southern Intercollegiate Athletic Association championship. A sports writer in The Atlanta Constitution wrote in September 1921:

"[T]he scintillating star of the fracas was big Mark Anthony at guard. 'The noblest Roman of them all' was playing a brand of football hard to beat. He made practically half of the tackles and if there was a scrimmage in which he was not in, it escaped the vigilant and hawkeyed eyes of the press. Mark is the coming lineman of the south. He has the weight, speed, and fighting quality, and with a little more experience he will be the foremost guard in the south."

At the end of the season, Anthony was selected to the 1921 College Football All-Southern Team. He received both bachelor's and master's degrees at Georgia.

== Coaching career ==
After leaving the University of Georgia, Anthony coached at Statesboro Agricultural School, Powder Springs A&M College, and Sale City High School in Sale City, Georgia. His Sale City basketball teams won two Georgia state championships.

In June 1928, he was hired as the head football and basketball coach at Atlantic Christian College—now known as Barton College–in Wilson, North Carolina. He remained in that post from 1928 to 1930. Atlantic Christian discontinued its intercollegiate football program at the end of the 1930 season.

== Military service ==
Anthony served in the United States Army during both World War I, enlisting in April 1918 and receiving his discharge in May 1919. During the war, he served in France with the 320th Field Artillery Regiment and achieved the rank of corporal. He served again during World War II from July 1942 to September 1944. He achieved the rank of first lieutenant during his second stint in the Army.

== Family and later years ==
Anthony was married in 1930 to Eunice Pauline Aycock They had two sons, Claude (born 1936) and John (born 1938).

After his coaching tenure ended, Anthony returned to Georgia where he was employed for several years as a teacher. After World War II, he worked for the Veterans Administration. In 1950, he returned to Wilson, North Carolina, where worked in the insurance business. He remained a supporter of Atlantic Christian athletics and was chosen in 1958 as the president of the Century Club, a group supporting the school's athletic programs.

Anthony died on February 27, 1958, in an automobile accident in Wilson County, North Carolina. He was buried at Maplewood Cemetery in Wilson.

== Head coaching record ==
=== College ===
Year	Team	Overall	Conference	Standing	Bowl/playoffs
Atlantic Christian Bulldogs (Independent) (1928–1929)
1928	Atlantic Christian	1–7			
1929	Atlantic Christian	2–4–1			
Atlantic Christian Bulldogs (North State Conference) (1930)
1930	Atlantic Christian	1–7	0–5	6th	
Atlantic Christian:		4–18–1	0–5		
Total:		4–18–1			
