= Sully Montgomery =

American football player (1901–1970)

Profile
- Position: Tackle

Personal information
- Born: January 12, 1901; Itasca, Texas, U.S.
- Died: September 5, 1970 (aged 69); Fort Worth, Texas, U.S.
- Listed height: 6 ft 3 in (1.91 m)
- Listed weight: 213 lb (97 kg)

Career information
- High school: Fort Worth (TX) North Side
- College: Centre College

Career history
- Centre (1917–1920); Chicago Cardinals (1923); Frankford Yellow Jackets (1927)

Awards and highlights
- Championships: 1 SIAA (1919); Honors: 2× All-Southern (1919, 1920); All-time Centre team
- Stats at Pro Football Reference

James Ralph "Sully" Montgomery (January 12, 1901 – September 5, 1970) was an American professional football player and boxer. Montgomery played college football for the Centre Praying Colonels of Centre College in Danville, Kentucky. He came there from the state of Texas. Montgomery played professionally in the National Football League (NFL) for the Chicago Cardinals and Frankford Yellow Jackets. After football, Montgomery was a professional boxer. He was the sheriff of Tarrant County, Texas from 1946 to 1952, but resigned after being convicted of tax fraud.

Montgomery played for North Side High School in Fort Worth, Texas for coach Robert L. Myers. Rogers Hornsby was on that team. Bo McMillin and Red Weaver both also played there, later meeting up with Red Roberts at Somerset (Ky.) High School. McMillin, Weaver, and Roberts joined up with Montgomery as well as Matty Bell, Bill James, and Bob Mathias from the Fort Worth high school at Centre College with their old coach Myers. The team went 7–1 in 1917, so good that Myers supposedly felt himself unable to coach them, and thus hired Charley Moran. The 1919 team went 9–0. Montgomery was a tackle on Centre's all-time football team chosen in 1935.
