= Andy Frye =

American football coach

Current position
- Title: Head coach
- Team: Centre
- Conference: SAA
- Record: 185–93

Biographical details
- Born: c. 1959 (age 66–67)

Playing career

Football
- 1977–1980: Muskingum
- Positions: Linebacker, defensive tackle

Coaching career (HC unless noted)

Football
- ?: Defiance (assistant)
- 1985–1988: Muskingum (DC)
- 1989–1997: Centre (assoc. HC/DC)
- 1998–present: Centre

Wrestling
- 1985–1989: Muskingum

Track and field
- 1989–?: Centre

Head coaching record
- Overall: 185–93 (football)
- Tournaments: 2–4 (NCAA D-III playoffs)

Accomplishments and honors

Championships
- Football; 1 SCAC (2003); 3 SAA (2014, 2018, 2024)

Awards
- Wrestling; OAC Coach of the Year (1987)

Andy Frye (born c. 1959) is an American college football coach and former wrestling and track and field coach. He is the head football coach for Centre College, a position he has held since 1998.

== Biography ==
A native of Westerville, Ohio, Frye attended Muskingum College—now known as Muskingum University—in New Concord, Ohio, where he played football, was team captain as a senior in 1980, and graduated in 1981. He earned a master's degree at Ohio University in Athens, Ohio before returning to Muskingum as head wrestling coach and assistant football coach in 1985. In 1987, Frye was named the Ohio Athletic Conference (OAC) Wrestling Coach of the Year.

Frye joined the coaching staff at Centre in 1989 as head coach in track and field and an assistant in football under Joe McDaniel. He succeeded McDaniel as head football coach after the 1997 season.

== Head coaching record ==
=== Football ===
Year	Team	Overall	Conference	Standing	Bowl/playoffs	D3^{#}
Centre Colonels (Southern Collegiate Athletic Conference) (1998–2011)
1998	Centre	3–7	3–3	4th		
1999	Centre	5–5	3–3	T–4th		
2000	Centre	5–5	3–3	T–4th		
2001	Centre	9–1	5–1	2nd		
2002	Centre	6–4	2–4	T–4th		
2003	Centre	8–2	5–1	T–1st		
2004	Centre	4–6	2–4	5th		
2005	Centre	7–3	3–3	4th		
2006	Centre	5–5	2–4	T–5th		
2007	Centre	6–4	4–3	T–4th		
2008	Centre	7–3	5–2	T–2nd		
2009	Centre	7–2	4–2	T–3rd		
2010	Centre	6–4	3–3	T–3rd		
2011	Centre	9–2	5–1	2nd	L NCAA Division III Second Round	16
Centre Colonels (Southern Athletic Association) (2012–present)
2012	Centre	6–4	1–3	T–4th		
2013	Centre	7–3	4–2	3rd		
2014	Centre	10–1	6–0	T–1st	L NCAA Division III First Round	22
2015	Centre	8–2	6–2	T–2nd		
2016	Centre	8–2	6–2	3rd		
2017	Centre	9–1	7–1	2nd		
2018	Centre	10–2	7–1	T–1st	L NCAA Division III Second Round	14
2019	Centre	5–5	3–5	T–6th		
2020–21	Centre	2–2	2–2	T–4th		
2021	Centre	8–2	5–2	3rd		
2022	Centre	6–4	4–3	4th		
2023	Centre	6–4	6–2	3rd		
2024	Centre	8–3	6–1	T–1st	L NCAA Division III Second Round	
2025	Centre	5–5	4–3	T–3rd		
2026	Centre	0–0	0–0			
Centre:		185–93	116–66			
Total:		185–93				
National championship Conference title Conference division title or championship game berth
