= Prairie Hill, Limestone County, Texas =

Prairie Hill, Texas
- Unincorporated community
- Location in Texas Location in the United States
- Coordinates: 31°39′19″N 96°47′20″W
- Country: United States
- State: Texas
- County: Limestone
- Elevation: 594 ft (181 m)
- Time zone: UTC-6 (Central (CST))
  - Summer (DST): UTC-5 (CDT)
- ZIP codes: 76678
- GNIS feature ID: 1365731

Prairie Hill is an unincorporated community in western Limestone County, Texas, United States. It lies along U.S. Route 84, northwest of the city of Groesbeck, the county seat of Limestone County. Its elevation is 594 feet (181 m). Although Prairie Hill is unincorporated, it has a post office, with the ZIP code of 76678.

Named for a small nearby hill, Prairie Hill's first settler was shopkeeper Marquis Perry, who became the first postmaster when the community received a post office in 1884. Although the post office was closed in 1906, it was reopened in 1925. The community continued to grow well into the twentieth century, reaching its peak during the Great Depression. It has declined since the early 1940s, although the community has remained rather stable for the last thirty years.
