= Bo McMillin =

American football player and coach (1895–1952)

- McMillin during his stint at Indiana

Biographical details
- Born: January 12, 1895; Prairie Hill, Texas, U.S.
- Died: March 31, 1952 (aged 57); Bloomington, Indiana, U.S.

Playing career

Football
- 1917: Centre
- 1919–1921: Centre
- 1922–1923: Milwaukee Badgers
- 1923: Cleveland Indians
- Position: Quarterback

Coaching career (HC unless noted)

Football
- 1922–1924: Centenary
- 1925–1927: Geneva
- 1928–1933: Kansas State
- 1934–1947: Indiana
- 1948–1950: Detroit Lions
- 1951: Philadelphia Eagles

Basketball
- 1925–1928: Geneva

Administrative career (AD unless noted)
- 1946–1947: Indiana
- 1948–1951: Detroit Lions (GM)

Head coaching record
- Overall: 140–77–13 (college football); 14–24 (NFL); 26–28 (college basketball)

Accomplishments and honors

Championships
- Football; 2 LIAA (1922–1923); 3 Tri-State (1925–1927); Big Ten (1945)

Awards
- Football: 2× Consensus All-American (1919, 1921); First-team All-American (1920); All-time Centre team (1935); AFCA Coach of the Year (1945); Amos Alonzo Stagg Award (1952)
- College Football Hall of Fame; Inducted in 1951 (profile)

Alvin Nugent "Bo" McMillin (January 12, 1895 – March 31, 1952) was an American football player and coach at the collegiate and professional level. He played college football at Centre College in Danville, Kentucky, where he was a three-time All-American at quarterback, and led the Centre Praying Colonels to an upset victory over Harvard in 1921. McMillin was inducted into the College Football Hall of Fame as a player as part of its inaugural 1951 class.

McMillin was the head football coach at Centenary College of Louisiana (1922–1924), Geneva College (1925–1927), Kansas State University (1928–1933) and Indiana University (1934–1947), compiling a career college football coaching record of 140–77–13. In 1945, he led Indiana to its first Big Ten Conference title and was named AFCA Coach of the Year.

After graduating from Centre, McMillin played professionally with the Milwaukee Badgers and Cleveland Indians—two early National Football League (NFL) teams—in 1922 and 1923. He later returned to the NFL, coaching the Detroit Lions from 1948 to 1950 and the Philadelphia Eagles for the first two games of the 1951 season before his death. McMillin's career NFL coaching mark was 14–24.

== Early years ==
McMillin was born on January 12, 1895, to Reuben Thomas McMillin and Martha Buchanan Reilly in Prairie Hill, Limestone County, Texas. The family moved in 1897 to Waco and in 1901 to Fort Worth. McMillin's father was a meat packer. As a child, Bo was known to pick fights, but was also known all his life as one who never drunk nor smoked nor swore. He spoke with a distinctive Texas drawl. He was an Irish Catholic.

He played football as a running back at North Side High School in Fort Worth and Somerset High School in Somerset, Kentucky. At North Side, he played with Red Weaver and was coached by Robert L. (Chief) Myers. Sully Montgomery, Matty Bell, Bill James and Bob Mathias also attended North Side. By the ninth grade, McMillin had reached his full growth at 5 feet 9 inches (1.75 m) and 165 pounds (75 kg).

Myers obtained the coaching job at his alma mater, Centre College, and brought all the above-named players with him. McMillin and Weaver did not have sufficient high-school credits to enter college and enrolled at Somerset High School for the 1916–17 year, playing with Red Roberts. "I've got a boy under my wing down here in Texas who's a football-playing fool and I want him to go to Centre. I'd like for you to get him in a high school up there, and away from his pool-playing pals in Texas." wrote Myers to a man in Somerset.

== Centre College ==
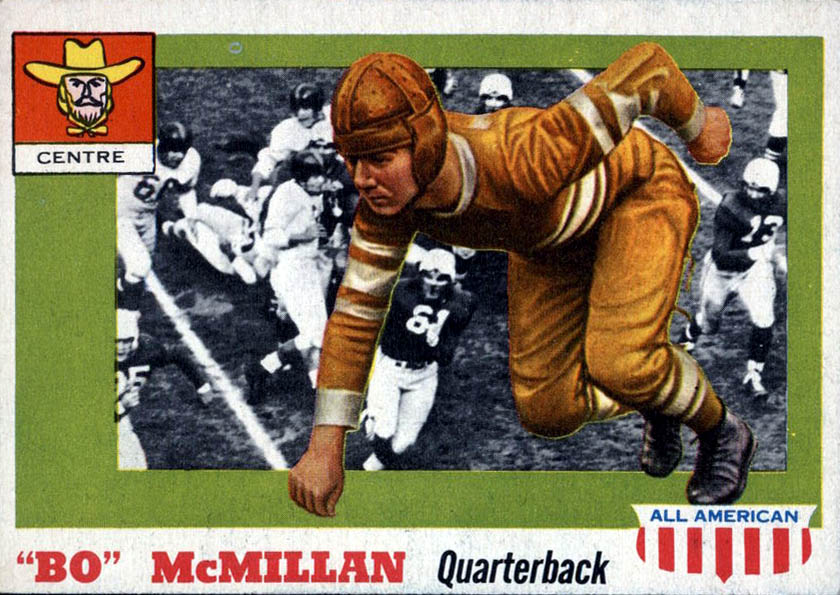
McMillin on a 1950s football card

McMillin began his collegiate career at Centre College in Kentucky. McMillin was a poor student who supported himself by gambling and liked to play football. McMillin failed all his courses during his senior year, eventually receiving his A.B. degree from Centre in 1937 with credit for military service and courses taken after he left the college. According to McMillin, he initially left Centre with $3,500 in debt.

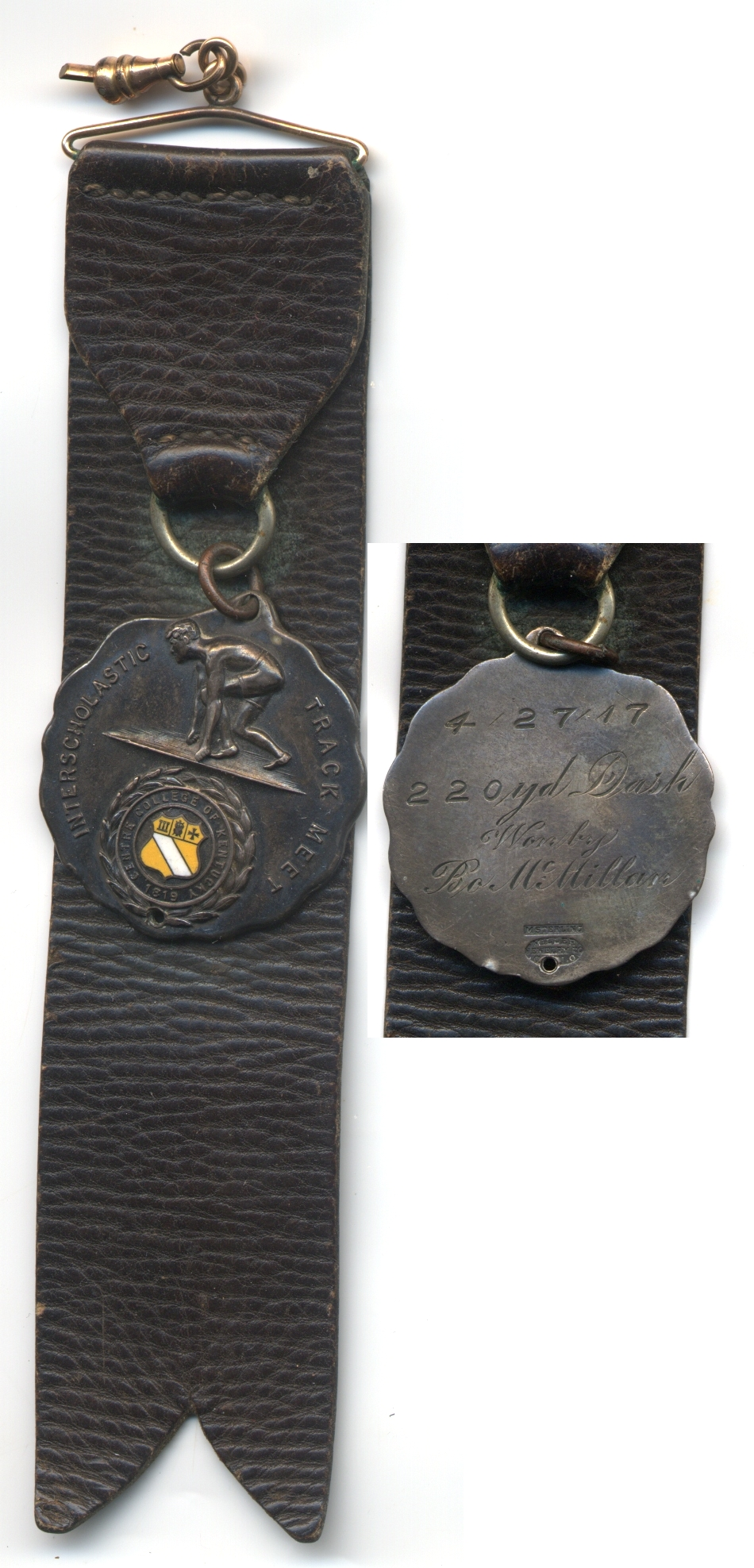
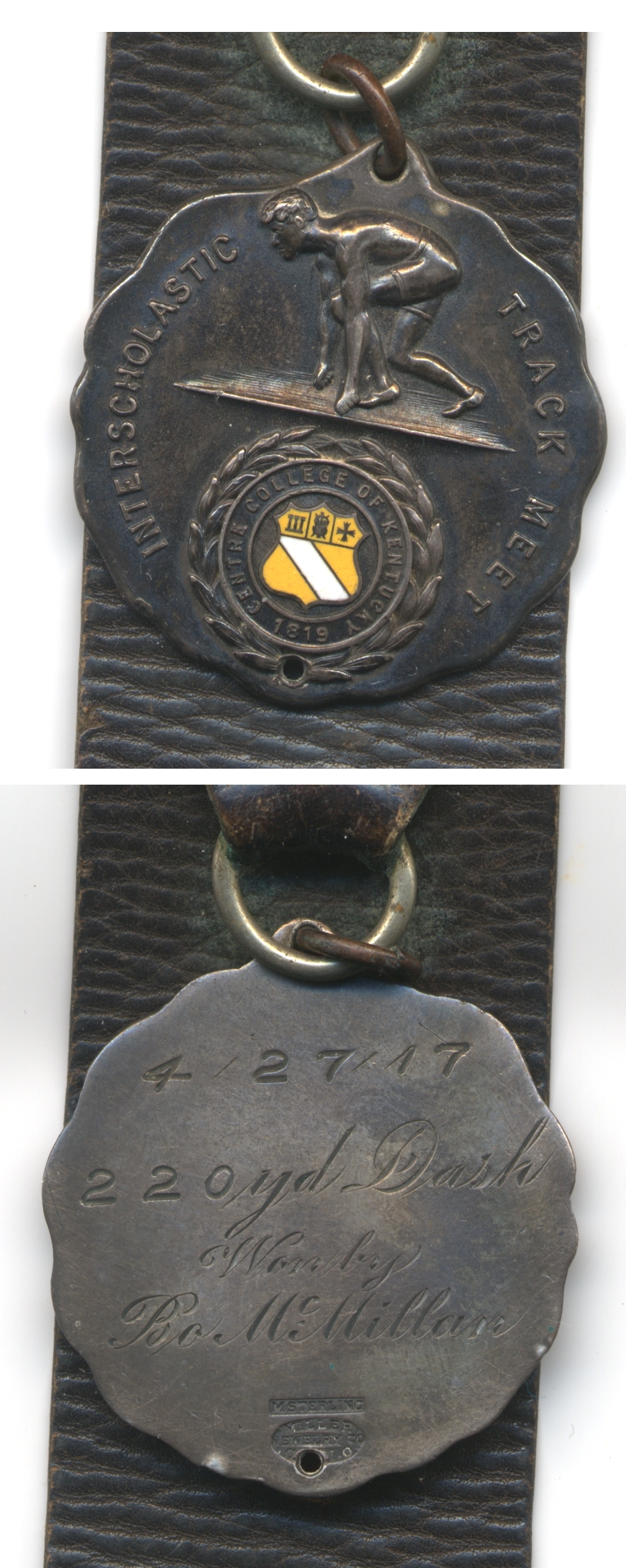
Track medal (with detail) won by McMillin on April 27, 1917

He was a Hall-of-Fame, three-time All-American, triple-threat quarterback on the Centre Colonels football team under head coaches Chief Myers and Charley Moran. McMillin was the quarterback on Centre's all-time football team which was chosen in 1935. He was nominated for the Associated Press All-Time Southeast 1869-1919-era team. In McMillin's day of iron man football, he was also a safety man on defense and a kick returner on special teams.

=== 1917 ===
He began playing football at Centre in 1917, making an impact as a freshman when his 17-yard drop kick defeated the rival Kentucky Wildcats 3–0 (his only field goal). During his freshman year, McMillin was also on the track team; on April 27, 1917, he won the 220-yard dash at a Centre interscholastic track meet.

He missed the following year to serve in the United States Navy during the final year of World War I before returning to Centre.

=== 1919 and 1920 seasons ===
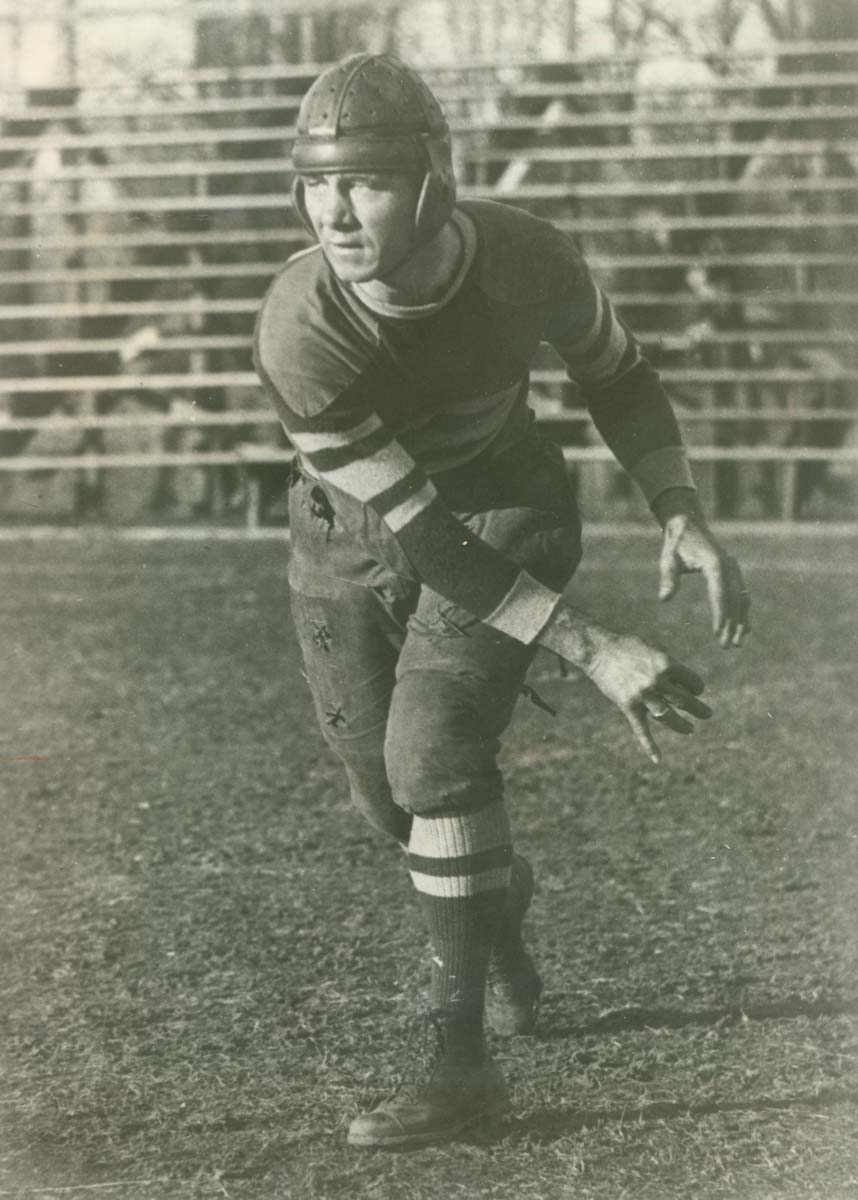
Around 1920

In 1919, McMillin was selected to the Walter Camp All-America first-team at quarterback after helping the Praying Colonels to a perfect 9–0 record (including upsets of Indiana and West Virginia). Centre had been down 3–0 to Indiana for most of the game, scoring a touchdown to lead 6–3 with just over a minute left. Desperate to even the score, Indiana tossed a pass which was intercepted by McMillin, who returned it for a touchdown, dodging and straight arming the entire Indiana eleven. McMillin had the team pray before the West Virginia game, giving the Centre College Colonels its nickname of the "Praying Colonels". The 1919 team was selected for a national championship by MIT statistician Jeff Sagarin.

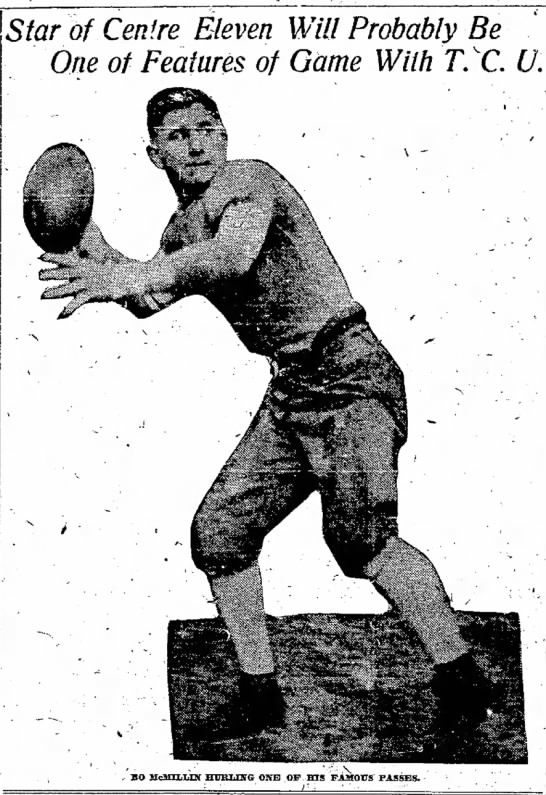
In 1920

In 1920, McMillin received second-team All-America honors from Camp as Centre posted another successful season. However, the season did include a disappointing 31–14 loss to defending national champion Harvard. With the Harvard game tied 7–7, it was 4th down and 6 at the 30-yard line. Instead of punting, McMillin "defied every "don't" in the football book" and tossed a touchdown pass.

McMillin also had his only loss to a team from the South, to Georgia Tech by a 20–0 score. Tech tackle Bill Fincher reportedly tried to knock McMillin out of the game with brass knuckles or "something equally diabolical." Before the game, Fincher said "You're a great player Bo...I feel awful sorry about it because you are not going to be in there very long—about three minutes." The Atlanta Constitution reported, "McMillin's forward passes outdid anything of the kind seen here in many years, but Tech seemed to know where they were going". According to one writer, "Even the great "Bo" McMillin was powerless against the Tech players".

=== 1921 ===
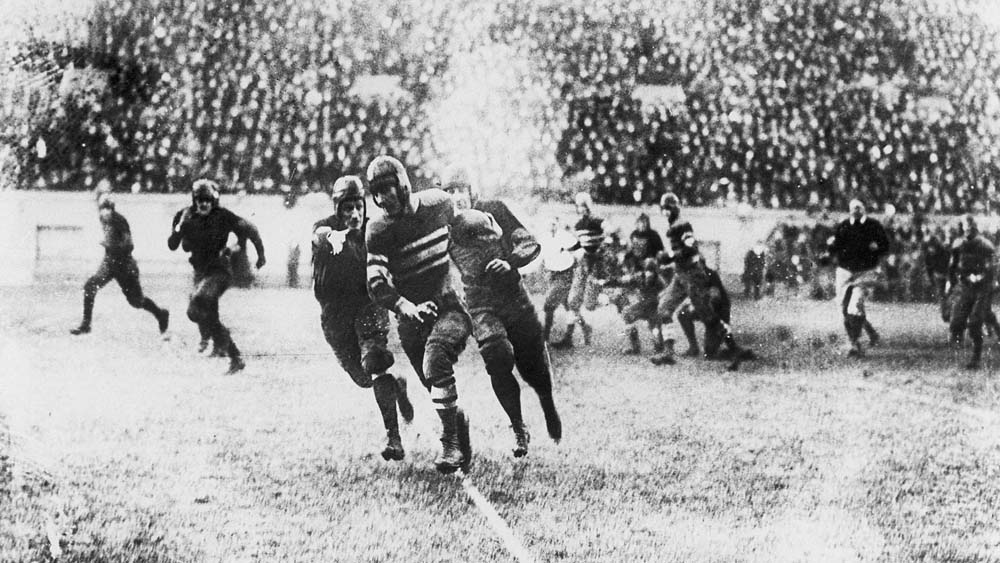
About to score against Harvard.

1921 was an exceptional season for McMillin and Centre College. He was a consensus All-American, with an extraordinary October 29, effort against Harvard. After losing the year before, McMillin had promised that Centre would beat Harvard in 1921 (despite the Crimson's undefeated record since 1918). Before 43,000 fans, McMillin dashed 32 yards for the lone touchdown in a 6–0 Centre victory which ended Harvard's 25-game winning streak. Fullback Red Roberts told him, "It's time to score—ride my hump". McMillin dodged three of Harvard's secondary on his way to the end zone. Harvard coach Bob Fisher said after the game, "In Bo McMillin, Centre has a man who is probably the hardest in the country to stop".

MIT students who attended the game to cheer against Harvard tore down the goalposts and hoisted him on their shoulders and for decades afterward, it was known as "football's upset of the century". Tulane coach Clark Shaughnessy later wrote that the win "first awoke the nation to the possibilities of Southern football." Students painted the "impossible formula" of C6H0 around Danville, and the campus post office has a last vestige of the graffiti on its side. On the return celebration in Danville on Monday, Governor Edwin P. Morrow remarked "I'd rather be Bo McMillin this moment than the Governor of Kentucky."

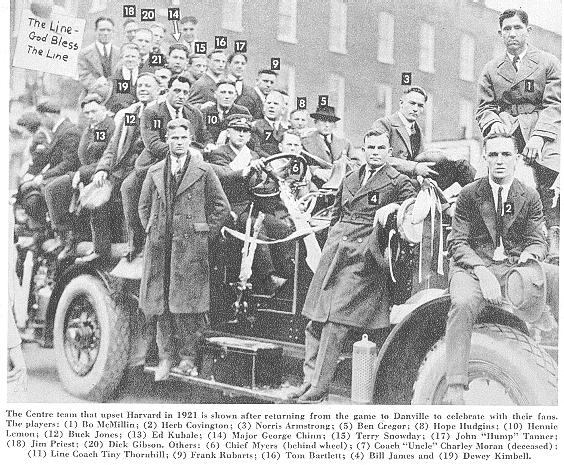
Centre players in Danville, fresh off the victory over Harvard. McMillin is top right.

The week before, Centre had defeated Transylvania 98–0 in a game where Spalding's Football Guide reported that McMillin ran back a kickoff 95 yards for a touchdown. The season ended with a 14–22 upset loss to Texas A&M in the Dixie Classic, when Texas A&M's 12th-man tradition originated. McMillin blamed himself for the loss. The day before the game, McMillin got married.

In an attempt to name Heisman Trophy winners retroactively before 1936, the National Football Foundation selected him as its 1921 recipient.

== Professional playing career ==
McMillin played professional football in the early days of the NFL, with the Milwaukee Badgers and the Cleveland Indians. McMillin could only play on certain weeks when the team he was coaching traveled North. The Badgers had to mail him the plays and signals the week before, pay him in advance, and he never had any practice with the team.

== Coaching career ==
Building upon his success as a player, McMillin became a coach and spent the next quarter-century compiling a 146–77–13 record. McMillin's "tactical contributions" were "both negligible," the five man backfield and the "cockeyed T." (Note: The cockeyed T resembled Robert Neyland's Tennessee single-wing.)

=== Centenary and Geneva ===
Preferring a small school, McMillin began at Centenary College of Louisiana in 1922. Over a three-year period, he lost only three of 28 games, and won two Louisiana Intercollegiate Athletic Association titles.

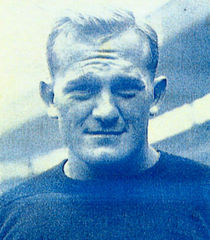
Cal Hubbard (pictured) was coached by McMillin at both Centenary and Geneva.

McMillin's success in Louisiana allowed him to move on to Geneva College in Beaver Falls, Pennsylvania, where he was the school's 13th head football coach for three seasons (1925–1927). His coaching record at Geneva was 22 wins, 6 losses and 1 tie, and he is a member of the Beaver County Sports Hall of Fame. Geneva College fans generally consider McMillin among the best coaches in school history. His teams, renowned for playing some of the best teams in college football, prided themselves on a challenging schedule. Geneva opened the 1926 season with a 16–7 upset of Harvard.

Former Centre player Swede Anderson followed McMillin to Centenary and Geneva. Mack Flenniken also followed coach McMillin, as well as Cal Hubbard, the only person inducted into the Pro Football and Baseball Halls of Fame and Centenary's first All-American, at both schools. Georgia Tech coach Bill Alexander once watched Centenary when it was in Atlanta to play Oglethorpe. "Bo, this Oglethorpe bunch has fast backs, but the line is light and green. If you turn that Hubbard loose, he might kill some of them. Have Cal 'hurt his knee', why don't you, and let him sit on the bench?"

=== Kansas State ===
In 1928, McMillin was hired by Kansas State University to replace Hall of Fame coach Charlie Bachman. He coached successfully at Kansas State for six years, including an 8–2 season in 1931, which after a 5–0 start and Rose Bowl aspirations had the Wildcats suffer close losses to Iowa State and Nebraska. (Note: The team included All-American end Henry Cronkite.) In his final season at the helm in 1933, Kansas State "had an unexpectedly fine season," including an upset of Oklahoma.

Elden Auker (McMillin's all-conference quarterback at Kansas State) wrote in his book, Sleeper Cars and Flannel Uniforms, "McMillin was a great psychologist. He really knew how to give us talks that fired us up ... The normal routine for McMillin was to bring us out onto the field to loosen up and then take us back into the locker room for a pep talk. By the time he was through talking, we believed we could take on the world".

=== Indiana ===
Coaching Indiana

McMillin's success at Kansas State propelled him into his most noteworthy achievements, coaching at Indiana University for 14 years, beginning in 1934. He helped improve the nondescript program to an undefeated season in 1945. (Note: Swede Anderson was his backfield coach from 1938 to 1945.) That year was the first in which the Hoosiers won the Big Nine Conference and the school's only outright conference title in the pre-championship game era. McMillin received the Coach of the Year Award. "I haven't seen Blanchard," said McMillin at the award ceremony's dinner, "but until I do, I'll settle for Pete Pihos any time."

McMillin was successful at the annual College All-Star game, winning in 1938 and 1946 against the defending NFL champions.

Indiana was reportedly at another Big Ten stadium when McMillin sought entrance several hours before the game, only to find the gates locked and guarded. He coaxed the guards to open one gate so they could discuss the problem and announced, "This is the Indiana football team. We've been marching around this place long enough, and, suh, we are not wearying ourselves before we get our suits on". He is the last Indiana football coach to have left with a winning record.

=== Detroit Lions ===
McMillin on the cover of a program for a 1948 Lions game.

Despite becoming the school's athletic director and earning apparent lifetime security, with seven years remaining on his most-recent contract the 53-year-old McMillin sought new challenges after the 1947 season. He accepted a five-year contract to coach the National Football League's Detroit Lions on February 19, 1948.

McMillin's coaching success disappeared with the Lions as the team dropped its first five games in 1948 and finished with a 2–10 record. In addition to many on-field changes, he briefly changed the team's colors from the familiar Hawaiian blue to maroon (similar to the color worn by his Indiana teams).

The Lions also struggled in 1949, with a 4–8 record, but picked up the rights to future star Doak Walker and brought in quarterback Bobby Layne and Heisman Trophy winner Leon Hart the following year. Continued conflict with players led to McMillin's departure after the end of the 1950 NFL season, which saw the Lions finish with a 6–6 record.

=== Philadelphia Eagles ===
He then took up the challenge of returning the Philadelphia Eagles to their previous glory when he was hired on February 8, 1951, succeeding Earle (Greasy) Neale. After two games, both victories, McMillin underwent surgery for what was thought to be stomach ulcers. The findings were far worse: stomach cancer, which ended his coaching career. On March 31, 1952, McMillin died of a heart attack; his funeral was attended by many fellow coaches and former players.

== Awards and accolades ==
In November 1951, during the last months of his life, McMillin was inducted into the College Football Hall of Fame for his success as a player. Two months later, he received the Amos Alonzo Stagg Award from the American Football Coaches Association for his contributions to the sport. In 2013 McMillin was posthumously inducted into the Kentucky Athletic Hall of Fame, and he is also a member of the Louisiana Sports Hall of Fame and the Texas Sports Hall of Fame.

In 1923 a horse named Bo McMillin, owned by J. Pendergast, ran in the Kentucky Derby. At odds of 12–1, the horse (ridden by D. Connelly) finished 12th in the 21-horse field.

McMillin's grandson, the son of his daughter Kathryn Jane Bubier, Craig McMillin Bubier, was an All-American lacrosse player at Johns Hopkins University in 1986. The next season, Bubier's senior year, was capped by Bubier scoring the winning goal to secure his third national championship. His championship streak continued in the 1990 World Games.

== Head coaching record ==
=== College football ===
| Year | Team | Overall | Conference | Standing | AP^{#} |
|---|---|---|---|---|---|
Centenary Gentlemen (Louisiana Intercollegiate Athletic Association) (1922–1924)
| 1922 | Centenary | 8–1 | | 1st | |
| 1923 | Centenary | 10–1 | | 1st | |
| 1924 | Centenary | 8–1 | | | |
| Centenary: | | 26–3 | | | |
Geneva Covenanters (Tri-State Conference) (1925–1927)
| 1925 | Geneva | 6–3 | 5–0 | 1st | |
| 1926 | Geneva | 8–2 | 4–0 | 1st | |
| 1927 | Geneva | 8–0–1 | 4–0 | 1st | |
| Geneva: | | 22–5–1 | 13–0 | | |
Kansas State Wildcats (Big Six Conference) (1928–1933)
| 1928 | Kansas State | 3–5 | 0–5 | 6th | |
| 1929 | Kansas State | 3–5 | 3–2 | 3rd | |
| 1930 | Kansas State | 5–3 | 3–2 | 3rd | |
| 1931 | Kansas State | 8–2 | 3–2 | 3rd | |
| 1932 | Kansas State | 4–4 | 2–3 | 4th | |
| 1933 | Kansas State | 6–2–1 | 4–1 | 2nd | |
| Kansas State: | | 29–21–1 | 15–15 | | |
Indiana Hoosiers (Big Ten Conference) (1934–1947)
| 1934 | Indiana | 3–3–2 | 1–3–1 | T–8th | |
| 1935 | Indiana | 4–3–1 | 2–2–1 | T–3rd | |
| 1936 | Indiana | 5–2–1 | 3–1–1 | T–4th | |
| 1937 | Indiana | 5–3 | 3–2 | 3rd | |
| 1938 | Indiana | 1–6–1 | 1–4 | 9th | |
| 1939 | Indiana | 2–4–2 | 2–3 | 8th | |
| 1940 | Indiana | 3–5 | 2–3 | T–6th | |
| 1941 | Indiana | 2–6 | 1–3 | T–7th | |
| 1942 | Indiana | 7–3 | 2–2 | T–5th | |
| 1943 | Indiana | 4–4–2 | 2–3–1 | 4th | |
| 1944 | Indiana | 7–3 | 4–3 | 5th | |
| 1945 | Indiana | 9–0–1 | 5–0–1 | 1st | 4 |
| 1946 | Indiana | 6–3 | 4–2 | 3rd | 20 |
| 1947 | Indiana | 5–3–1 | 2–3–1 | T–6th | |
| Indiana: | | 63–48–11 | 34–34–6 | | |
| Total: | | 140–77–13 | | | |
National championship Conference title Conference division title or championship game berth
^{#}Rankings from final AP Poll.

=== NFL ===
| Team | Year | Regular Season | | | | |
| Team | Year | Won | Lost | Ties | Win % | Finish |
|---|---|---|---|---|---|---|
| DET | 1948 | 2 | 10 | 0 | .167 | 5th in NFL Western |
| DET | 1949 | 4 | 8 | 0 | .333 | 4th in NFL Western |
| DET | 1950 | 6 | 6 | 0 | .500 | 4th in NFL National |
| DET Total | | 12 | 24 | 0 | .333 | |
| PHI | 1951 | 2 | 0 | 0 | 1.000 | 5th in NFL American |
| PHI Total | | 2 | 0 | 0 | 1.000 | |
| Total | | 14 | 24 | 0 | .368 | |

== Books ==
- Auker, Elden (2001). Sleeper Cars and Flannel Uniforms. Triumph Books. ISBN 1-892049-25-2.
- Brown, John Y. (1970). The Legend of the Praying Colonels. Louisville, Kentucky: J. Marvin Gray & Associates, Inc.
- Camp, Walter (1922). National Collegiate Athletic Association Football Rules: Official Intercollegiate Football Guide. New York: Spalding's Athletic Library.
- Cook, William A. (October 25, 2012). Big Klu: The Baseball Life of Ted Kluszewski. McFarland. ISBN 9780786490844 – via Google Books.
- Fitzgerald, Tim (2001). Wildcat gridiron guide: past & present stories about K-State football. Spirit Street Pub. ISBN 9780970345806.
- Goldstein, Richard (1996). Ivy League Autumns. St. Martin's Press. ISBN 978-0-312-14629-0.
- Griffith, R. D. (September 1, 2012). To the NFL: You Sure Started Somethin': A Historical Guide of All 32 NFL Teams and the Cities They've Played In. Dorrance Publishing. ISBN 9781434916815 – via Google Books.
- Hammel, Bob (January 1, 1999). Indiana University: Glory of Old IU. Sports Publishing LLC. ISBN 9781582610689 – via Internet Archive.
- Kaplan, Inc. (June 22, 2004). The Unofficial, Unbiased Guide to the 331 Most Interesting Colleges 2005. Simon and Schuster. ISBN 9780743251990.
- Maxymuk, John (August 2, 2012). NFL Head Coaches: A Biographical Dictionary, 1920-2011. McFarland. ISBN 9780786492954 – via Google Books.
- National Collegiate Athletic Association (1934). Spalding's Football Guide.
- Pope, Edwin (1956). Football's Greatest Coaches.
- Schoor, Gene (1994). The Fightin' Texas Aggies: 100 Years of A&M Football. Dallas, Texas: Taylor Publishing Company.
- Shanklin, William L. (May 1, 1995). Against All Odds: Football's Great Comebacks and Upsets. Barclay House Books. ISBN 9780935016130.
- Stallard, Mark (January 1, 2000). Wildcats to Powercats: K-State Football Facts and Trivia. Rowman & Littlefield. ISBN 9781584970040 – via Google Books.
- Yust, Walter (1952). Encyclopædia Britannica: a new survey of universal knowledge. Vol. 9.
