= Red Weaver =

American football player and coach

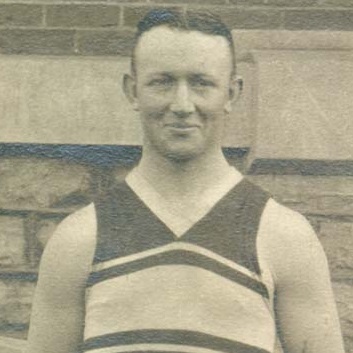
- Weaver, c. 1920

Biographical details
- Born: July 19, 1897; Garland, Texas, U.S.
- Died: November 23, 1968 (aged 71); Mayfield, Kentucky, U.S.

Playing career
- 1917–1920: Centre
- 1923: Columbus Tigers
- Positions: Center, kicker

Coaching career (HC unless noted)
- 1921: New River State
- 1924–1925: Columbus Tigers
- 1932–1933: Morris Harvey

Head coaching record
- Overall: 5–20–1 (college); 4–13 (NFL)

Accomplishments and honors

Championships
- 1 SIAA (1919)

Awards
- Consensus All-American (1919); 2x All-Southern (1919, 1920); All-time Centre team Associated Press Southeast Area All-Time football team 1869-1919 era

James Redwick "Red" Weaver (July 19, 1897 – November 23, 1968) was an American football player and coach.

== Centre College ==
Weaver was a prominent center for the Centre Praying Colonels football teams of Centre College in Danville, Kentucky. After graduating from North Side High School in Fort Worth, Texas, coached by former Centre player Robert L. Myers, Weaver and several teammates were to go to Centre. However, Weaver, along with Bo McMillin, did not have sufficient credits to enter college, and thus entered Somerset High School in Somerset, Kentucky for the 1916–17 year. Red Roberts was already a member of the Somerset squad. The three formed a powerful nucleus which went undefeated. He kicked 37 consecutive field goals from 1917 to 1918. Weaver was the center on Centre's all-time football team chosen in 1935; picked over Ed Kubale.

=== 1919 ===
Weaver was recognized as a consensus first-team All-American in 1919, while playing center for the Centre Colonels football team of Centre College. Weaver was the smallest lineman ever to make All-American. He was 5 feet 10 inches and 185 pounds.

=== 1920 ===
Weaver held the NCAA record for 99 consecutive points after touchdowns in the 1919 and 1920 seasons. Weaver was put at the placekicker position on an Associated Press Southeast Area All-Time football team 1869-1919 era.

== Coaching ==
Weaver was the head football coach at West Virginia University Institute of Technology in Montgomery, West Virginia. He held that position for the 1921 season. His coaching record at West Virginia Tech was 4–3–1. He also coached the Columbus Tigers in 1924 and 1925.

== Pro football ==
Weaver later played center professionally for the Columbus Tigers of the National Football League (NFL) in 1923

== Head coaching record ==
=== College ===
Year	Team	Overall	Conference	Standing	Bowl/playoffs
New River State Golden Bears (Independent) (1921)
1921	New River State	4–3–1			
New River State:		4–3–1			
Morris Harvey Golden Eagles (West Virginia Athletic Conference) (1932–1933)
1932	Morris Harvey	0–9	0–4	7th	
1933	Morris Harvey	1–8	0–5	7th	
Morris Harvey:		1–17	0–9		
Total:		5–20–1			
