= Joe McDaniel =

American football coach (1934–2020)

Biographical details
- Born: July 2, 1934; Bellville, Ohio, U.S.
- Died: January 27, 2020 (aged 85); Danville, Kentucky, U.S.
- Education: Muskingum University (1956)

Playing career

Football
- 1952–1955: Muskingum

Basketball
- 1952–1956: Muskingum

Baseball
- 1953–1956: Muskingum
- Positions: Defensive back, quarterback (football)

Coaching career (HC unless noted)

Football
- 1956–1957: Marion Harding HS (OH) (RB)
- 1958–1962: Muskingum (RB)
- 1963–1965: Muskingum (DC)
- 1966–1979: Marietta
- 1980–1997: Centre

Golf
- 1958–1965: Muskingum (assistant)
- 1981–1993: Centre

Basketball
- 1956–1957: Marion Harding HS (OH) (assistant)

Administrative career (AD unless noted)
- 1969–1979: Marietta
- 1998–2002: Centre

Head coaching record
- Overall: 167–122–5 (football)

Accomplishments and honors

Championships
- Football; 6 CAC/SCAC (1980, 1983–1985, 1989–1990, 1995); 1 OAC Blue Division (1973)

Awards
- Football; First-team All-OAC (1955)

Joseph Wesley McDaniel (July 2, 1934 – January 27, 2020) was an American college football coach. He was the head football coach for the Marietta College from 1966 to 1979 and Centre College from 1980 to 1997. He also coached for Marion Harding High School and Muskingum. He played college football for Muskingum as a quarterback and defensive back.

== Head coaching record ==
=== Football ===
Year	Team	Overall	Conference	Standing	Bowl/playoffs	D3^{#}
Marietta Pioneers (Ohio Athletic Conference) (1966–1979)
1966	Marietta	4–4–1	2–3	T–8th		
1967	Marietta	4–4–1	4–1–1	4th		
1968	Marietta	7–2	6–1	T–2nd		
1969	Marietta	8–1	6–1	2nd		
1970	Marietta	4–5	3–4	T–6th		
1971	Marietta	4–5	3–3	7th		
1972	Marietta	4–5	1–3	T–4th (Blue)		
1973	Marietta	6–4	3–1	1st (Blue)		
1974	Marietta	6–3	3–2	3rd (Red)		
1975	Marietta	4–5	3–2	T–3rd (Red)		
1976	Marietta	5–4	3–2	3rd (Blue)		
1977	Marietta	3–6	3–2	3rd (Blue)		
1978	Marietta	5–4	2–3	4th (Blue)		
1979	Marietta	2–7	0–5	6th (Blue)		
Marietta:		66–59–2	42–36–1			
Centre Colonels (College Athletic Conference / Southern Collegiate Athletic Conference) (1980–1997)
1980	Centre	4–4–1	4–0–1	T–13th		
1981	Centre	4–5	2–3	4th		
1982	Centre	5–4	3–2	T–2nd		
1983	Centre	5–3–1	4–1	T–1st		
1984	Centre	7–2	4–0	1st		
1985	Centre	6–3	3–1	T–1st		
1986	Centre	8–1	3–1	2nd		13
1987	Centre	4–5	1–3	T–3rd		
1988	Centre	6–3	2–2	3rd		
1989	Centre	8–1	4–0	1st		
1990	Centre	8–2	3–1	T–1st		
1991	Centre	5–5	2–2	4th		
1992	Centre	3–6	2–2	3rd		
1993	Centre	4–5	1–3	T–4th		
1994	Centre	8–2	3–1	2nd		
1995	Centre	5–4–1	3–1	T–1st		
1996	Centre	5–5	3–1	T–4th		
1997	Centre	6–3	3–1	2nd		
Centre:		101–63–3	50–25–1			
Total:		167–122–5				
National championship Conference title Conference division title or championship game berth
