= Centre Colonels football =

Football team representing Centre College in Kentucky, USA

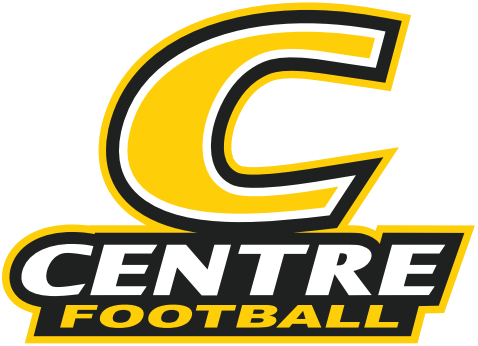
- First season: 1880; 146 years ago
- Athletic director: Brad Fields
- Head coach: Andy Frye; 28th season, 180–88 (.672)
- Location: Danville, Kentucky
- Stadium: Andy Frye Stadium
- NCAA division: Division III
- Conference: SAA
- Colors: Black and Gold
- All-time record: 616–414–37 (.595)
- Bowl record: 2–1 (.667)

National championships
- Claimed: 1 (1919)

Conference championships
- 16 (11 SCAC, 3 SIAA, 2 SAA)
- Consensus All-Americans: 2
- Website: centrecolonels.com/football

The Centre Colonels football team, historically also known as the Praying Colonels, represents Centre College in NCAA Division III competition. The Colonels currently play in the Southern Athletic Association (SAA), which was established in 2011. Before the establishment of the SAA, Centre played 50 seasons in the Southern Collegiate Athletic Conference (SCAC). Despite the school's small size (2008 enrollment of 1,215), the football team has historically had success and possesses a strong tradition. At the end of the 2008 season, the school ranked as the 12th most winning school in Division III with an all-time record of 509–374–37.

== History ==
On April 9, 1880, a Centre College team traveled to Lexington to play against Transylvania University in the first football game south of the Ohio River. The Colonels lost that game, and a rematch at home later in the month, but it was the start of a long-running rivalry with their in-state opponent. The first officially recognized game of Centre and the University of Kentucky took place in 1891. In that series, the Colonels compiled a 20–13–2 record before the Kentucky athletic council decided to permanently drop Centre from their schedule after the 1929 season.

At the beginning of the Roaring '20s, Harvard University, the nation's dominant football power, was riding a two-year undefeated streak whose last loss had been to Brown in 1918. Then the Crimson invited Centre (enrollment at that time: 264) to Cambridge for what they thought would be a "warm-up" game, a light workout before facing Princeton the following week.

From 1917 to 1924, Centre compiled a 57–8 record while playing against some of the best teams in the nation. The team was retroactively selected by Jeff Sagarin as co-national champion for the 1919 season. After the 1920 season, Centre faced Texas Christian (TCU) in the Fort Worth Classic. The Colonels convincingly routed them, 63–7.

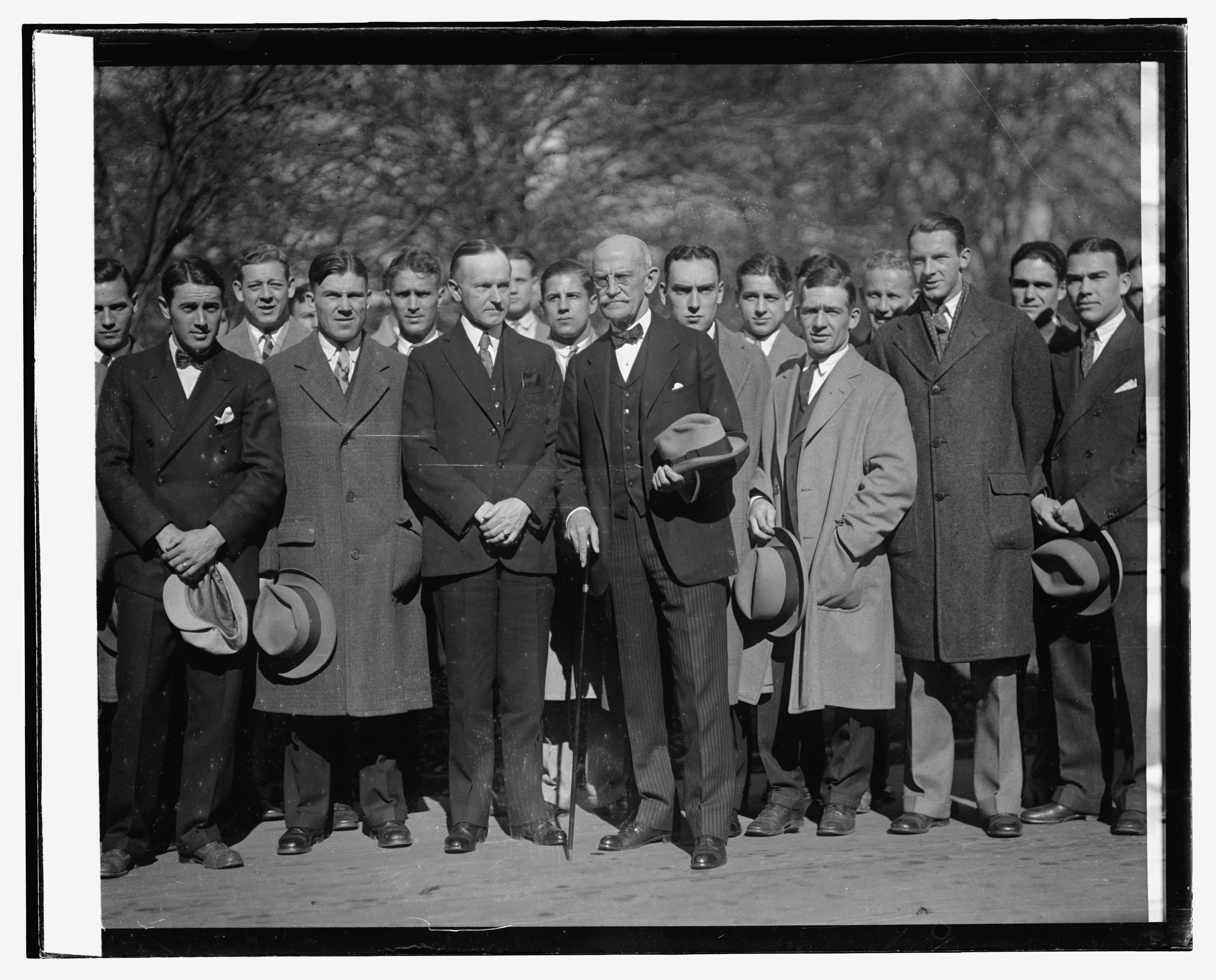
Members of the Centre College football team meeting with President Calvin Coolidge and Senator Richard P. Ernst in 1921

The 1921 Centre–Harvard game resulted in one of the most shocking upsets in college football, with the Colonels winning, 6–0. The Colonels (under coach Charley Moran) shocked Harvard and became the first school from outside the East to ever beat one of the Ivy League's "Big Three" of Harvard, Yale, and Princeton.

Star player Bo McMillin rushed for the lone touchdown of the game early in the third quarter, and the Praying Colonels' defense held off the Crimson's powerful offense from there for a 6–0 victory, a feat that The New York Times later dubbed "Football's Upset of the Century". The Centre College official website claims the 1921 national championship, apparently on this basis. 29 years later, in 1950, the Associated Press chose the Centre win as the greatest sports upset of the first half of the 20th century. ESPN described Centre's victory as one of the biggest upsets in all sports during the twentieth century.

The star of that game, back Alvin "Bo" McMillin, was twice named a consensus All-American, in 1919 and 1921. Center Red Weaver was named a consensus All-American alongside him in 1919. The Colonels finished the 1921 season undefeated, outscoring their opponents, 314–6. In the Dixie Classic, precursor to the modern Cotton Bowl Classic, Centre faced Texas A&M. Miscues contributed to the Colonels' defeat, 22–14. This is also the game in which Texas A&M's 12th man tradition originated.

On four consecutive Saturdays in 1924, the Colonels defeated Kentucky, Tennessee, Alabama, and Georgia. That same season, Centre defeated Georgia and Alabama and claims a southern title. As early as 1927, a writer noted that its glory days were short-lived as losses mounted and it fell out of the limelight.

Centre again found success during the 1950s. In 1951, the Colonels finished the season with a 5–1 record and were invited to play Northern Illinois State in the Corn Bowl. The invitation, however, was rejected by the school administration who wished to de-emphasize football. From 1954 to 1956, Centre compiled a sixteen-game winning streak. In 1955, the undefeated Colonels were again invited to a postseason game, the Tangerine Bowl, but once more declined.

In recent years, Centre has secured eight SCAC championships between 1980 and 2003. Jack "Teel" Bruner, a safety from 1982 to 1985, became the second Centre Colonel inducted into the College Football Hall of Fame. In 1984, he recorded five interceptions against Rose-Hulman, tying the all-time record.

In 2011, the Colonels' final SCAC season, they finished second in the conference, but received an at-large invitation to the NCAA tournament. The Colonels defeated Hampden–Sydney in the first round to earn their first Division III tournament win, and lost in the next round to traditional D-III powerhouse Mount Union.

The Colonels' 2014 season was arguably their most successful in decades. They won their first SAA championship and finished the regular season 10–0, marking the team's first unbeaten regular season since 1955 and only the third in school history. The season ended in the first round of the Division III playoffs against John Carroll.

== Conference affiliations ==
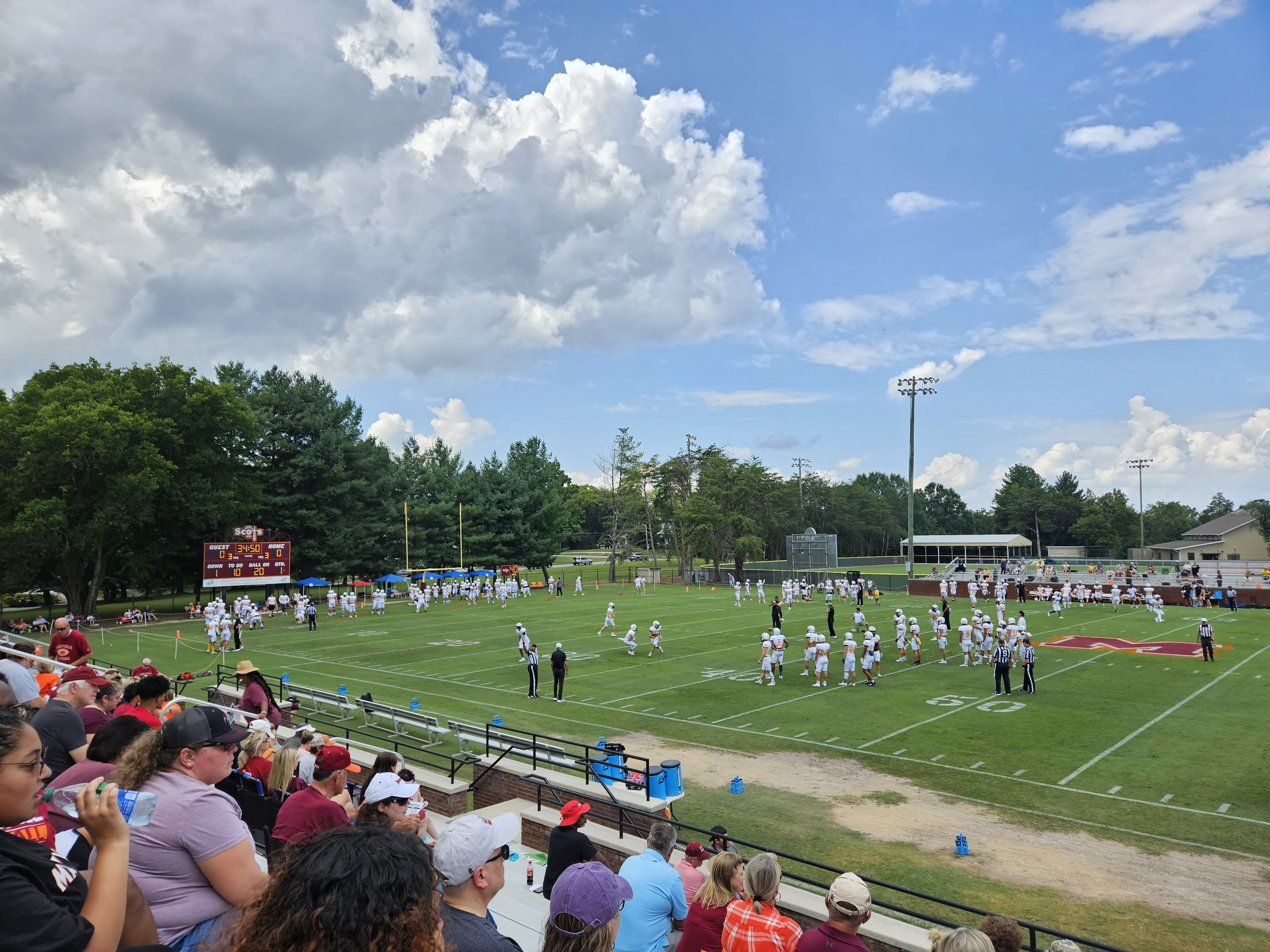
Centre Colonels football team warming up for a game versus the Maryville College Scots

- Independent (1880, 1894–1923)
- Southern Intercollegiate Athletic Association (1924–1941)
- Southern Collegiate Athletic Conference (1962–2011)
- Southern Athletic Association (2012–present)

== Postseason appearances ==
=== NCAA Division III playoffs ===
The Colonels have made four appearances in the NCAA Division III playoffs, with a combined record of 2–4.

Year	Round	Rival	Result
2011	First Round; Second Round	Hampden–Sydney; Mount Union	W, 51–41; L, 10–30
2014	First Round	John Carroll	L, 28–63
2018	First Round; Second Round	Washington & Jefferson; Mount Union	W, 54–13; L, 23–51
2024	Second Round	Carnegie Mellon	L, 15–24

== Championships ==
=== National championships ===
Centre won its lone national championship in 1919. Centre claims this championship.

Season	Coach	Selector	Record
1919	Charley Moran	Sagarin	9–0

=== Independent Southern championships ===
Year	Coach	Overall	Record
1910	M. B. Banks	9–0	
1919	Charles Moran	9–0	
1921	Charles Moran	10–1	

=== Conference championships ===
Year	Conference	Coach	Overall record	Conference record
1924	Southern Intercollegiate	Robert L. Myers	5–1–1	1–0
1968	Southern Collegiate	Steele Harmon	5–3–1	3–1
1969	Southern Collegiate	Steele Harmon	6–4	4–0
1971	Southern Collegiate	Steele Harmon	3–6	3–1
1980	Southern Collegiate	Joe McDaniel	4–4–1	4–0–1
1983	Southern Collegiate	Joe McDaniel	5–3–1	4–1
1984	Southern Collegiate	Joe McDaniel	7–2	4–0
1985	Southern Collegiate	Joe McDaniel	6–3	3–1
1989	Southern Collegiate	Joe McDaniel	8–1	4–0
1990	Southern Collegiate	Joe McDaniel	8–2	3–1
1995	Southern Collegiate	Joe McDaniel	5–4–1	3–1
2003	Southern Collegiate	Andy Frye	8–2	5–1
2014	Southern Athletic	Andy Frye	10–1	6–0
2018	Southern Athletic	Andy Frye	10–2	7–1
2024	Southern Athletic	Andy Frye	8–3	6–1 (Note: Shared with Trinity University and Berry College)

== Individual achievements ==
=== Consensus All-Americans ===
Centre has three consensus All-America selections.

- Bo McMillin, B (1919, 1921)
- Red Weaver, C (1919)

=== College Football Hall of Fame ===
Two former Centre players have been inducted into the College Football Hall of Fame, located in Atlanta, Georgia.

Name	Pos.	Tenure	Inducted	Ref.
Bo McMillin	QB	1917–1921	1951	
Teel Bruner	DB	1982–1985	1999	
